= Golf at the 2020 Summer Olympics – Women's individual =

Women's golf at the Games of the XXXII Olympiad
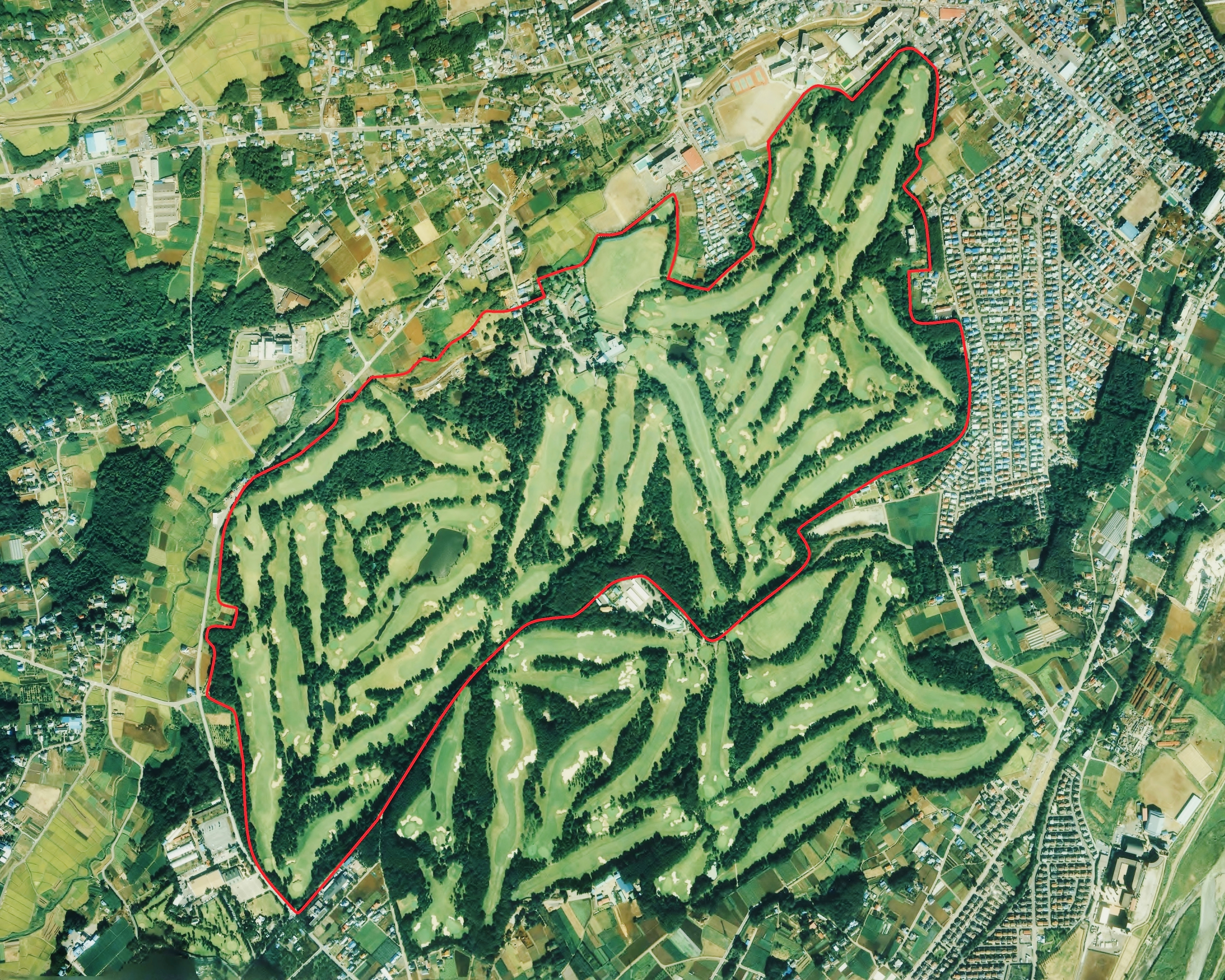
- Golf course at Kasumigaseki Country Club
- Venue: Kasumigaseki Country Club
- Dates: 4–7 August 2021
- Competitors: 60 from 35 nations
- Winning score: 267 (−17)

Medalists
1st place, gold medalist(s)		Nelly Korda	United States
2nd place, silver medalist(s)		Mone Inami	Japan
3rd place, bronze medalist(s)		Lydia Ko	New Zealand

The women's individual golf event at the 2020 Summer Olympics took place from 4 to 7 August 2021 at the Kasumigaseki Country Club. 60 golfers from 35 nations competed. Nelly Korda of the United States took gold, and Mone Inami of Japan and Lydia Ko of New Zealand tied for second with Inami taking the silver in a sudden-death playoff. For Ko, it was her second consecutive Olympic medal after a silver in 2016.

== Background ==
The first Olympic golf tournaments took place at the second modern Games in Paris 1900. Men's and women's events were held. Golf was featured again at the next Games, St. Louis 1904 with men's events (an individual tournament as well as a team event). The 1908 Games in London were also supposed to have a golf competition, but a dispute led to a boycott by all of the host nation's golfers, leaving only a single international competitor and resulting in the cancellation of the event. Golf would disappear from the Olympic program until returning in 2016.

== Qualification ==
Each nation can qualify from one to four golfers based on the World Rankings of 28 June 2021. The top 60 golfers, subject to limits per nation and guarantees for the host and continental representation, are selected. A nation can have three or four golfers if they are all in the top 15 of the rankings; otherwise, each nation is limited to two golfers. One spot is guaranteed for the host nation and five spots are guaranteed to ensure that each Olympic continent has at least one representative.

== Competition format ==
Following the format used when golf was returned to the Olympic programme in 2016, the tournament is a four-round stroke play tournament, with the lowest score over the total 72 holes winning.

== Schedule ==
As with most major stroke play tournaments, the event is held over four days (Wednesday through Saturday) with each golfer playing one round (18 holes) per day.

All times are Japan Standard Time (UTC+9)

Date	Time	Round
Wednesday, 4 August 2021	7:30	First round
Thursday, 5 August 2021	7:30	Second round
Friday, 6 August 2021	7:30	Third round
Saturday, 7 August 2021	6:30	Final round

== Results ==
=== First round ===
Wednesday, 4 August 2021

Madelene Sagström of Sweden shot a 5-under-par 66 to take a one-stroke lead over Aditi Ashok of India and world number one Nelly Korda of the United States. Inbee Park, 2016 gold medalist, was three shots off the lead at 69. The heat index was over 100 °F (38 °C), approaching dangerous levels.

Rank	Player	Nation	Score	To par
1	Madelene Sagström	Sweden	66	−5
T2	Aditi Ashok	India	67	−4
T2	Nelly Korda	United States	67	−4
T4	Matilda Castren	Finland	68	−3
T4	Carlota Ciganda	Spain	68	−3
T4	Ko Jin-young	South Korea	68	−3
T7	Hsu Wei-ling	Chinese Taipei	69	−2
T7	Danielle Kang	United States	69	−2
T7	Kim Sei-young	South Korea	69	−2
T7	Min Lee	Chinese Taipei	69	−2
T7	Nanna Koerstz Madsen	Denmark	69	−2
T7	Azahara Muñoz	Spain	69	−2
T7	Bianca Pagdanganan	Philippines	69	−2
T7	Inbee Park	South Korea	69	−2
T7	Klára Spilková	Czech Republic	69	−2

=== Second round ===
Thursday, 5 August 2021

Nelly Korda took a four stroke lead after a second round of 62. Korda was 11-under-par after 17 holes but had a double-bogey at the final hole. Aditi Ashok, Nanna Koerstz Madsen and Emily Kristine Pedersen were tied for second place, with first round leader Madelene Sagström a further stroke behind, in fifth place.

Rank	Player	Nation	Score	To par
1	Nelly Korda	United States	67-62=129	−13
T2	Aditi Ashok	India	67-66=133	−9
T2	Nanna Koerstz Madsen	Denmark	69-64=133	−9
T2	Emily Kristine Pedersen	Denmark	70-63=133	−9
5	Madelene Sagström	Sweden	66-68=134	−8
T6	Mone Inami	Japan	70-65=135	−7
T6	Ko Jin-young	South Korea	68-67=135	−7
8	Hannah Green	Australia	71-65=136	−6
T9	Lydia Ko	New Zealand	70-67=137	−5
T9	Lin Xiyu	China	71-66=137	−5

=== Third round ===
Friday, 6 August 2021

Nelly Korda had a third round of 69 to lead by three strokes from Aditi Ashok, who birdied two of the last four holes. Four players, Hannah Green, Mone Inami, Lydia Ko and Emily Kristine Pedersen, were tied for third place, five behind Korda.

Rank	Player	Nation	Score	To par
1	Nelly Korda	United States	67-62-69=198	−15
2	Aditi Ashok	India	67-66-68=201	−12
T3	Hannah Green	Australia	71-65-67=203	−10
T3	Mone Inami	Japan	70-65-68=203	−10
T3	Lydia Ko	New Zealand	70-67-66=203	−10
T3	Emily Kristine Pedersen	Denmark	70-63-70=203	−10
T7	Nasa Hataoka	Japan	70-68-67=205	−8
T7	Nanna Koerstz Madsen	Denmark	69-64-72=205	−8
T7	Madelene Sagström	Sweden	66-68-71=205	−8
T10	Matilda Castren	Finland	68-70-68=206	−7
T10	Shanshan Feng	China	74-64-68=206	−7
T10	Kim Sei-young	South Korea	69-69-68=206	−7
T10	Ko Jin-young	South Korea	68-67-71=206	−7
T10	Lin Xiyu	China	71-66-69=206	−7
T10	Stephanie Meadow	Ireland	72-66-68=206	−7

=== Final round ===
Saturday, 7 August 2021

Mone Inami beat Lydia Ko in a sudden-death playoff for the silver medal.

Rank	Player	Nation	Rd 1	Rd 2	Rd 3	Rd 4	Total	To par
1st place, gold medalist(s)	Nelly Korda	United States	67	62	69	69	267	−17
2nd place, silver medalist(s)	Mone Inami	Japan	70	65	68	65	268	−16
3rd place, bronze medalist(s)	Lydia Ko	New Zealand	70	67	66	65	268	−16
4	Aditi Ashok	India	67	66	68	68	269	−15
T5	Hannah Green	Australia	71	65	67	68	271	−13
T5	Emily Kristine Pedersen	Denmark	70	63	70	68	271	−13
7	Stephanie Meadow	Ireland	72	66	68	66	272	−12
8	Shanshan Feng	China	74	64	68	67	273	−11
T9	Nasa Hataoka	Japan	70	68	67	69	274	−10
T9	Kim Sei-young	South Korea	69	69	68	68	274	−10
T9	Ko Jin-young	South Korea	68	67	71	68	274	−10
T9	Lin Xiyu	China	71	66	69	68	274	−10
T9	Nanna Koerstz Madsen	Denmark	69	64	72	69	274	−10
T9	Yuka Saso	Philippines	74	68	67	65	274	−10
T15	Hsu Wei-ling	Chinese Taipei	69	69	71	66	275	−9
T15	Kim Hyo-joo	South Korea	70	68	70	67	275	−9
T15	Jessica Korda	United States	71	67	73	64	275	−9
T18	Matilda Castren	Finland	68	70	68	70	276	−8
T18	Albane Valenzuela	Switzerland	71	69	67	69	276	−8
T20	Danielle Kang	United States	69	69	74	65	277	−7
T20	Sanna Nuutinen	Finland	70	68	69	70	277	−7
T20	Madelene Sagström	Sweden	66	68	71	72	277	−7
T23	María Fassi	Mexico	73	70	68	68	279	−5
T23	Leona Maguire	Ireland	71	67	70	71	279	−5
T23	Anna Nordqvist	Sweden	72	69	68	70	279	−5
T23	Inbee Park	South Korea	69	70	71	69	279	−5
T23	Klára Spilková	Czech Republic	69	70	71	69	279	−5
T23	Patty Tavatanakit	Thailand	71	71	69	68	279	−5
T29	Carlota Ciganda	Spain	68	73	70	69	280	−4
T29	Perrine Delacour	France	70	70	69	71	280	−4
T29	Brooke Henderson	Canada	74	68	71	67	280	−4
T29	Minjee Lee	Australia	71	68	73	68	280	−4
33	Lexi Thompson	United States	72	71	69	69	281	−3
T34	Pia Babnik	Slovenia	71	71	73	67	282	−2
T34	Céline Boutier	France	73	68	72	69	282	−2
T34	Min Lee	Chinese Taipei	69	69	72	72	282	−2
T34	Kelly Tan	Malaysia	73	73	72	64	282	−2
T38	Daniela Darquea	Ecuador	72	73	65	73	283	−1
T38	Gaby López	Mexico	71	72	69	71	283	−1
T40	Caroline Masson	Germany	71	70	68	75	284	E
T40	Sophia Popov	Germany	71	72	70	71	284	E
T40	Jodi Ewart Shadoff	Great Britain	74	68	70	72	284	E
T43	Maha Haddioui	Morocco	72	74	70	69	285	+1
T43	Ariya Jutanugarn	Thailand	77	67	69	72	285	+1
T43	Bianca Pagdanganan	Philippines	69	71	71	74	285	+1
T46	Manon De Roey	Belgium	71	67	74	74	286	+2
T46	Giulia Molinaro	Italy	75	71	70	70	286	+2
48	Maria Torres	Puerto Rico	73	77	70	67	287	+3
49	Alena Sharp	Canada	74	71	69	75	289	+5
T50	Tiffany Chan	Hong Kong	77	74	69	70	290	+6
T50	Diksha Dagar	India	76	72	72	70	290	+6
T50	Azahara Muñoz	Spain	69	76	73	72	290	+6
T50	Mariajo Uribe	Colombia	73	77	70	70	290	+6
54	Kim Métraux	Switzerland	74	70	74	73	291	+7
55	Mel Reid	Great Britain	73	75	76	68	292	+8
56	Christine Wolf	Austria	71	72	81	73	297	+13
57	Anne van Dam	Netherlands	74	78	69	77	298	+14
58	Magdalena Simmermacher	Argentina	76	70	78	76	300	+16
59	Lucrezia Colombotto Rosso	Italy	75	74	75	78	302	+18
60	Tonje Daffinrud	Norway	81	73	81	74	309	+25

The medals for the competition were presented by Odette Assembe-Engoulou, Cameroon; IOC Member, and the medalists' bouquets were presented by Annika Sörenstam, Sweden; IGF President.
