= 2020 ANA Inspiration =

Tournament information
- Dates: September 10–13
- Location: Rancho Mirage, California; 33.798°N 116.433°W
- Courses: Mission Hills Country Club; Dinah Shore Tournament Course
- Tour: LPGA Tour
- Format: 72-holes stroke play

Statistics
- Par: 72
- Length: 6,763 yd (6,184 m)
- Field: 104 players, 76 after cut
- Cut: 148 (+4)
- Prize fund: $3.1 million
- Winner's share: 465,000

Champion
- (South Korea) Mirim Lee
- 273 (−15), playoff
- Location in the United States Location in California

The 2020 ANA Inspiration was the 49th ANA Inspiration LPGA golf tournament, held on the Dinah Shore Tournament Course at Mission Hills Country Club in Rancho Mirage, California. Originally scheduled for April 2–5, the tournament was postponed to September 10–13, due to the COVID-19 pandemic. This was its 38th year as an LPGA major championship, and it was the second major of 2020 following the AIG Women's Open, held in August.

The championship was held in a bubble (Note: In response to the COVID-19 pandemic, many professional sports were suspended. Upon their return some organisations and teams created isolated secure environments for everyone involved. These environments were dubbed "bubbles".) and behind closed doors, although residents of the Mission Hills gated community were able to watch from within the boundaries of their own homes. A large blue colored structure, dubbed the "Big Blue Wall", was erected behind the 18th green, where a grandstand would normally have been, in order to promote the championships main sponsor. This attracted much criticism since it served as a backstop, preventing approach shots from going into the water behind the green.

Due to expected conditions in the California desert in September, with forecast temperatures in excess of 105 °F (41 °C), the LPGA allowed caddies to ride in carts for the duration of the tournament. Players could also ride in carts during practice rounds, but were still required to walk during the tournament.

Mirim Lee won her first major championship with a birdie at the first extra hole of a playoff with Brooke Henderson and Nelly Korda. The three had tied at 273 (15-under-par) after 72 holes. The big blue wall played its part, as both Lee and Henderson used the backstop on the final hole of regulation play to make eagle and birdie respectively to tie Korda, who could only make par.

== Field ==
Players were eligible to compete in the ANA Inspiration by means of various qualification criteria. Those who received exemptions included past champions, recent LPGA major winners, leading players from the LPGA Tour and the U.S. Women's Amateur champion. On September 4, a field of 105 players was confirmed.

Seven past champions were in the field; Pernilla Lindberg, Lydia Ko, Brittany Lincicome, Lexi Thompson, Stacy Lewis, Morgan Pressel and seven-time major winner Inbee Park. Other leading contenders included 2017 Women's PGA Champion and world number two Danielle Kang, world number three Nelly Korda, and two-time major winner and world number four Park Sung-hyun. Among the six amateurs in the field were U.S. Women's Amateur champions Rose Zhang (2020) and Gabriela Ruffels (2019).

Several past champions did not compete; they included defending champion and world number one Ko Jin-young and 2017 winner Ryu So-yeon. Also missing were many other leading South Korean players, including Kim Hyo-joo and Lee Jeong-eun, numbers 10 and 11 respectively in the world rankings. 2020 Women's British Open champion Sophia Popov was also not in the field as her exemption for winning the first major of 2020 was not active until 2021.

Two days prior to the tournament starting, England's world number 28 Charley Hull was forced to withdraw from the field after testing positive for COVID-19. The LPGA reported that no other players had returned a positive test.

=== Qualification criteria ===
1. Active LPGA Tour Hall of Fame members (Note: Players must have participated in ten official LPGA Tour tournaments within the past year before the commitment deadline in order to be deemed active.)

2. Winners of all previous ANA Inspiration tournaments

3. Winners of the U.S. Women's Open, Women's PGA Championship, Women's British Open and The Evian Championship in the previous five years (Note: Exemptions for past LPGA major winners are fixed as of the originally scheduled date. As such, the winner of the 2020 Women's British Open does not gain exemption until 2021.)

4. Winners of official LPGA Tour tournaments from the 2016 ANA Inspiration through the week immediately preceding the 2020 ANA Inspiration

5. All players who finished in the top-20 in the previous year's ANA Inspiration

6. All players who finished in the top-5 of the previous year's U.S. Women's Open, Women's PGA Championship, Women's British Open and The Evian Championship

7. Top-80 on the previous year's season-ending LPGA Tour official money list

8. Top-30 on the Women's World Golf Rankings as of 9 March 2019

9. Top-2 players from the previous year's season-ending Ladies European Tour Order of Merit, LPGA of Japan Tour money list and LPGA of Korea Tour money list

10. Top-20 players plus ties on the current year LPGA Tour official money list at the end of the last official tournament prior to the current ANA Inspiration, not otherwise qualified above, provided such players are within the top-80 positions on the current year LPGA Tour official money list at the beginning of the tournament competition

11. Previous year's Louise Suggs Rolex Rookie of the Year

12. Previous year's U.S. Women's Amateur champion, provided she is still an amateur at the beginning of tournament competition

13. Any LPGA Member who did not compete in the previous year's ANA Inspiration major due to injury, illness or maternity, who subsequently received a medical/maternity extension of membership from the LPGA in the previous calendar year, provided they were otherwise qualified to compete in the previous year's ANA Inspiration

14. Up to six sponsor invitations for top-ranked amateur players

=== Final field ===
Marina Alex, Brittany Altomare, Pajaree Anannarukarn, Céline Boutier, Ashleigh Buhai, Chella Choi, Chun In-gee, Carlota Ciganda, Cydney Clanton, Perrine Delacour, Austin Ernst, Jodi Ewart Shadoff, María Fassi, Dana Finkelstein, Kristen Gillman, Hannah Green, Jaye Marie Green, Georgia Hall, Nasa Hataoka, Caroline Hedwall, Brooke Henderson, Esther Henseleit, Dani Holmqvist, Caroline Inglis, Ji Eun-hee, Tiffany Joh, Ariya Jutanugarn, Moriya Jutanugarn, Danielle Kang, Yui Kawamoto, Cristie Kerr, Megan Khang, Christina Kim, In-Kyung Kim, Kim Sei-young, Katherine Kirk, Cheyenne Knight, Lydia Ko, Jessica Korda, Nelly Korda, Jennifer Kupcho, Brittany Lang, Nicole Broch Larsen, Bronte Law, Andrea Lee, Lee Mi-hyang, Minjee Lee, Mirim Lee, Stacy Lewis, Brittany Lincicome, Pernilla Lindberg, Lin Xiyu, Yu Liu, Gaby López, Nanna Koerstz Madsen, Leona Maguire, Caroline Masson, Ally McDonald, Stephanie Meadow, Olivia Mehaffey (a), Emilia Migliaccio (a), Azahara Muñoz, Yealimi Noh, Haru Nomura, Anna Nordqvist, Ryann O'Toole, Su-Hyun Oh, Amy Olson, Kaitlyn Papp (a), Annie Park, Park Hee-young, Inbee Park, Park Sung-hyun, Pornanong Phatlum, Gerina Piller, Morgan Pressel, Mel Reid, Gabriela Ruffels (a), Madelene Sagström, Lizette Salas, Sarah Schmelzel, Alena Sharp, Hinako Shibuno, Jenny Shin, Jennifer Song, Klára Spilková, Angela Stanford, Linnea Ström, Thidapa Suwannapura, Elizabeth Szokol, Emma Talley, Kelly Tan, Patty Tavatanakit, Charlotte Thomas, Lexi Thompson, Maria Torres, Ayako Uehara, Anne van Dam, Lindsey Weaver, Amy Yang, Jing Yan, Lei Ye (a), Angel Yin, Rose Zhang (a)

== Round summaries ==
=== First round ===
Thursday, September 10, 2020

World number three Nelly Korda returned a six under par round of 66 to secure a one stroke lead at the conclusion of the first round. One stroke behind were two time major winner and 2016 runner-up Chun In-gee, and Madelene Sagström. 2016 Women's PGA Champion Brooke Henderson, and 2017 Women's PGA Champion and world number two Danielle Kang were in a group of five players a stroke further back. Ten players were tied at three under par including former ANA Inspiration winners Lydia Ko (2016) and Brittany Lincicome (2009, 2015).

Place	Player	Score	To par
1	(United States) Nelly Korda	66	−6
T2	(South Korea) Chun In-gee	67	−5
T2	(Sweden) Madelene Sagström	67	−5
T4	(Canada) Brooke Henderson	68	−4
T4	(United States) Danielle Kang	68	−4
T4	(China) Yu Liu	68	−4
T4	(Denmark) Nanna Koerstz Madsen	68	−4
T4	(Malaysia) Kelly Tan	68	−4
T9	(Australia) Hannah Green	69	−3
T9	(United States) Kristen Gillman	69	−3
T9	(England) Georgia Hall	69	−3
T9	(South Korea) Kim Sei-young	69	−3
T9	(New Zealand) Lydia Ko	69	−3
T9	(South Korea) Lee Mi-hyang	69	−3
T9	(China) Lin Xiyu	69	−3
T9	(United States) Brittany Lincicome	69	−3
T9	(South Korea) Park Sung-hyun	69	−3
T9	(England) Melissa Reid	69	−3

=== Second round ===
Friday, September 11, 2020

Place	Player	Score	To par
1	(United States) Nelly Korda	66-67=133	−11
2	(South Korea) Mirim Lee	70-65=135	−9
T3	(Denmark) Nanna Koerstz Madsen	68-69=137	−7
T3	(United States) Lexi Thompson	70-67=137	−7
T5	(South Korea) Chun In-gee	67-71=138	−6
T5	(Malaysia) Kelly Tan	68-70=138	−6
T7	(Canada) Brooke Henderson	68-71=139	−5
T7	(United States) Danielle Kang	68-71=139	−5
T7	(United States) Christina Kim	70-69=139	−5
T7	(South Korea) Kim Sei-young	69-70=139	−5
T7	(Australia) Katherine Kirk	72-67=139	−5
T7	(South Korea) Lee Mi-hyang	69-70=139	−5
T7	(China) Yu Liu	68-71=139	−5
T7	(England) Mel Reid	69-70=139	−5
T7	(Australia) Gabriela Ruffels (a)	71-68=139	−5
T7	(Puerto Rico) Maria Torres	70-69=139	−5

=== Third round ===
Saturday, September 12, 2020

Brooke Henderson and Nelly Korda were tied for the lead after three rounds. Henderson reached the turn on 30 and had a round of 65, while Korda dropped three strokes at the 5th and 6th holes and finished with a 71. 17-year-old Rose Zhang, the winner of the U.S. Women's Amateur, scored 67 and was tied for 7th place.

Place	Player	Score	To par
T1	(Canada) Brooke Henderson	68-71-65=204	−12
T1	(United States) Nelly Korda	66-67-71=204	−12
T3	(Australia) Katherine Kirk	72-67-67=206	−10
T3	(South Korea) Mirim Lee	70-65-71=206	−10
T3	(United States) Lexi Thompson	70-67-69=206	−10
6	(Spain) Carlota Ciganda	70-70-67=207	−9
T7	(United States) Stacy Lewis	70-71-67=208	−8
T7	(England) Mel Reid	69-70-69=208	−8
T7	(Puerto Rico) Maria Torres	70-69-69=208	−8
T7	(United States) Rose Zhang (a)	71-69-68=208	−8

=== Final round ===
Sunday, September 13, 2020

Overnight leaders Brooke Henderson and Nelly Korda shared and alternated the lead for much of the final round, with neither able to stretch their lead beyond one stroke until a double-bogey on the 13th hole by Henderson was followed by a birdie on the 14th hole by Korda, which moved her to 15 under par. Mirim Lee closed to within one stroke of Korda with a chip-in for birdie on the 16th hole, her second hole-out of the day after chipping in on the 6th hole. Henderson also made a birdie on the 16th to move back to 14 under par as Lee dropped back to 13 under par with a bogey on the 17th.

On the par-5 closing hole, Lee hit her second shot over the green and, after taking a free drop from against the blue wall, proceeded to chip-in for an eagle, her third hole-out of the day, to tie Korda at 15 under par. Playing behind Lee, Korda drove into the rough and had to lay-up short of the water guarding the front of the final green. Henderson was able to go for the green and, like Lee, went over the back with her ball finishing inside the blue wall. Korda could only make par after missing the green with her approach, and Henderson, having taken a free drop, was able to get up-and-down for birdie to tie Korda and Lee and force a three-way playoff for the title.

Rose Zhang, the 2020 U.S. Women's Amateur champion, finish tied for 11th with an 8-under-par 280, taking low-amateur honors. Her 72-hole score of 280 was the lowest amateur score in the tournament's history. Her finish allowed her to reach number 1 in the World Amateur Golf Ranking.

Place	Player	Score	To par	Prize money (US$)
T1	(Canada) Brooke Henderson	68-71-65-69=273	−15	Playoff
T1	(United States) Nelly Korda	66-67-71-69=273	−15	Playoff
T1	(South Korea) Mirim Lee	70-65-71-67=273	−15	Playoff
4	(United States) Lexi Thompson	70-67-69-69=275	−13	159,679
5	(United States) Stacy Lewis	70-71-67-68=276	−12	128,524
6	(New Zealand) Lydia Ko	69-74-69-66=278	−10	105,156
T7	(Japan) Nasa Hataoka	70-73-67-69=279	−9	74,388
T7	(Australia) Katherine Kirk	72-67-67-73=279	−9	74,388
T7	(Australia) Minjee Lee	71-69-72-67=279	−9	74,388
T7	(England) Mel Reid	69-70-69-71=279	−9	74,388

==== Scorecard ====
Final round

Hole	1	2	3	4	5	6	7	8	9	10	11	12	13	14	15	16	17	18
Par	4	5	4	4	3	4	4	3	5	4	5	4	4	3	4	4	3	5
(South Korea) Lee	−10	−11	−11	−11	−11	−12	−12	−12	−12	−12	−12	−13	−13	−13	−13	−14	−13	−15
(Canada) Henderson	−12	−13	−13	−14	−14	−14	−14	−14	−14	−14	−15	−15	−13	−13	−13	−14	−14	−15
(United States) Korda	−12	−13	−14	−14	−14	−15	−15	−14	−15	−14	−15	−14	−14	−15	−15	−15	−15	−15
(United States) Thompson	−10	−11	−11	−10	−11	−10	−10	−11	−11	−11	−12	−12	−12	−12	−11	−12	−12	−13
(United States) Lewis	−8	−9	−9	−9	−9	−9	−9	−9	−9	−10	−10	−10	−10	−10	−10	−11	−12	−12

Cumulative tournament scores, relative to par

Eagle	Birdie	Bogey	Double bogey

==== Playoff ====
The sudden-death playoff was held on the par-5 18th hole; Mirim Lee won with a birdie on the first extra hole.

Place	Player	Money ($)
1	(South Korea) Mirim Lee	465,000
T2	(Canada) Brooke Henderson	245,480
T2	(United States) Nelly Korda	245,480

Hole	18
Par	5
(Canada) Henderson	5
(United States) Korda	5
(South Korea) Lee	4

Birdie

== Media ==
Golf Channel televised the championship for the tenth consecutive year.
