= Leslie Cloots =

Belgian professional golfer

Personal information
- Nationality: Belgium
- Born: 1994 (age 31–32) Antwerp, Belgium
- Height: 5 ft 8 in (1.73 m)

Career
- Sport: Golf
- College: University of North Carolina at Chapel Hill
- Turned professional: 2017
- Former tour: Symetra Tour (joined 2017)

Leslie Cloots (born 1994) is a professional golfer from Belgium who played on the Symetra Tour. She was runner-up at the 2014 British Ladies Amateur and the 2016 European Ladies Amateur.

== Amateur career ==
Cloots was born and raised in Antwerp, Belgium, where her home club is Ternesse G&CC. At the age of 13, she started competing in international amateur events.

Cloots was a member of the Belgium National Team and was part of the Espirito Santo Trophy squad in 2012, 2014 and 2016. She also appeared at the European Girls' Team Championship in 2011 and 2012, and the European Ladies' Team Championship in 2014, 2015 and 2016.

Cloots attended University of North Carolina at Chapel Hill from 2013 to 2017, and graduated with a Bachelor of Science in business administration. She played for the North Carolina Tar Heels women's golf team and led the school in scoring average as a sophomore, junior and senior.

Cloots excelled individually, however she recorded more second-place finishes than victories. She was runner-up at the Omnium Classic of Belgium behind Manon De Roey in 2011. In 2012, she was a semi-finalist at 2012 Belgian National Match Play, and runner-up at the 2012 King's Prize, an event she won in 2013. In 2012, she was also runner-up at the Belgium National Junior Stroke Play Championship, and at the Annika Invitational Europe at Linköping Golf Club, 2 strokes behind Linnea Ström. In 2013, she was runner-up at the Belgian International Amateur, 2 strokes behind Laura Gonzalez Escallon.

In 2014, she lost the final of the British Ladies Amateur to Emily Kristine Pedersen, 3 and 1. Both in 2015 and 2016, Cloots was runner-up at the Belgian International Amateur & National Stroke Play Championship.

In 2016, Cloots captured stroke-play medalist honors at the British Ladies Amateur. She was runner-up at the European Ladies Amateur Championship at Hook Golf Club in Sweden, one stroke behind Bronte Law, after leading all the way until a final round of 74.

== Professional career ==
Cloots joined the Symetra Tour in 2017. She went from making one cut in 11 starts in 2017 to making nine cuts in 15 starts in 2021. Her best finish is a tie for 6th at the Danielle Downey Credit Union Classic. She made her LPGA Tour debut at the 2021 LPGA Mediheal Championship following Monday qualifying. She missed the cut and failed in her bid to join Manon De Roey in qualifying for the 2020 Summer Olympics.

Since 2018, Cloots hosts the Birdiecast podcast about life on tour together with 2020 LPGA Tour rookie Maia Schechter.

== Amateur wins ==
- 2013 King's Prize

== Team appearances ==
Amateur

- European Girls' Team Championship (representing Belgium): 2011, 2012
- European Ladies' Team Championship (representing Belgium): 2014, 2015, 2016
- Espirito Santo Trophy (representing Belgium): 2012, 2014, 2016
