= Olivia Mehaffey =

Irish professional golfer (born 1998)

Personal information
- Nationality: Northern Ireland
- Born: 9 October 1998 (age 28) Banbridge, Northern Ireland
- Height: 5 ft 11 in (1.80 m)

Career
- Sport: Golf
- College: Arizona State University
- Turned professional: 2021
- Current tour: Ladies European Tour (joined 2022)

Best results in LPGA major championships
- Chevron Championship: T74: 2020
- Women's PGA C'ship: DNP
- U.S. Women's Open: CUT: 2018, 2020, 2026
- Women's British Open: CUT: 2016, 2017, 2020
- Evian Championship: DNP

Olivia Mehaffey (born 9 October 1998) is a professional golfer from Northern Ireland who plays on the Ladies European Tour.

== Amateur career ==
Mehaffey enjoyed a very successful amateur career and reached a rank of No. 5 in the World Amateur Golf Rankings and No. 2 in the European Amateur Golf Rankings.

In 2014, she won the Irish Girls U18 Open Stroke Play Championship and played in the Lalla Meryem Cup, an LET event, where she made the cut. She won the 2015 the Helen Holm Scottish Women's Open Championship, and won the Welsh Ladies Open Stroke Play Championship in both 2015 and 2016. In 2016, she also won the Irish Women's Open Stroke Play Championship and the Irish Women's Amateur Close Championship. She was a semi-finalist at the British Ladies Amateur in 2015 and finished 3rd at the 2016 European Ladies Amateur Championship.

Mehaffey played in the Curtis Cup twice, and in 2016 at Dun Laoghaire Golf Club outside of Dublin helped lead the Great Britain & Ireland team to victory after going 3-1-1.

In 2016, Mehaffey along with Leona Maguire and Annabel Wilson won the third place bronze medal for Ireland in the 2016 Espirito Santo Trophy held at Mayakoba El Camaleon Golf Club in Mexico.

Mehaffey joined Arizona State University in 2016 and played with the Arizona State Sun Devils women's golf team. As a freshman in 2017, she helped ASU win the NCAA Championship by notching match-play victories in all three wins over Florida, Stanford and Northwestern (title match). She won the 2019 Pac-12 Championship and NCAA Norman Regional back-to-back. She overcame a four-stroke deficit in the final round to win the Pac-12 Championship in a playoff with Albane Valenzuela. She took advantage of the NCAA granting an additional year of eligibility for spring-sport athletes due to COVID-19 cutting short the 2019-20 season.

Mehaffey's amateur pedigree earned her spots in two U.S. Women's Opens and three Women's British Opens, the first the 2016 Women's British Open at Woburn Golf and Country Club when she was 18. She also competed in the 2020 ANA Inspiration, where she made her first major cut. In 2021, she finished in a share of ninth place in her second appearance at the Augusta National Women's Amateur. She started in the Arizona Women's Classic on the Symetra Tour in March, where she finished in a share of sixth place after leading the event at the half way stage.

== Professional career ==
Mehaffey turned professional after the spring semester in 2021 and made her LPGA Tour debut as a professional on home soil in Ballymena, 30 miles from Belfast, at the inaugural ISPS Handa World Invitational. She finished tied for 17th place.

She joined the 2022 Ladies European Tour after finishing 24th at LET Q-School. The best finish in her rookie season was 9th place at the Madrid Ladies Open. She withdrew during the Skaftö Open and took the second half of the season off to process the grief after her father died of cancer.

In 2023, she shot an 8-under 64 to take the lead after the first day of the Amundi German Masters, ultimately finishing in a tie for 12th. Two weeks later she shot a 9-under 207 at the Ladies Finnish Open to finish in a tie for 3rd, her best professional result so far.

== Amateur wins ==
- 2014 Irish Girls U18 Open Stroke Play Championship
- 2015 Helen Holm Scottish Women's Open Championship, Welsh Ladies Open Stroke Play Championship
- 2016 Irish Women's Open Stroke Play Championship, Irish Women's Amateur Close Championship, Welsh Ladies Open Stroke Play Championship
- 2018 Northrop Grumman Regional Challenge
- 2019 Bruin Wave Invitational, Pac-12 Championship, NCAA Norman Regional

== Results in LPGA majors ==
Results not in chronological order.

Tournament	2016	2017	2018	2019	2020	2021	2022	2023	2024	2025	2026
Chevron Championship					T74						
U.S. Women's Open			CUT		CUT						CUT
Women's PGA Championship											
The Evian Championship					NT						
Women's British Open	CUT	CUT			CUT						

Did not play

CUT = missed the half-way cut
NT = no tournament
T = tied

== Team appearances ==
Amateur

- European Young Masters (representing Ireland): 2011, 2012, 2013
- Junior Vagliano Trophy (representing Great Britain & Ireland): 2013
- Youth Olympic Games (representing Ireland): 2014
- Junior Solheim Cup (representing Europe): 2015
- Vagliano Trophy (representing Great Britain & Ireland): 2015, 2017
- Girls Home Internationals (representing Ireland): 2012, 2015
- Women's Home Internationals (representing Ireland): 2013, 2014, 2015, 2016
- European Girls' Team Championship (representing Ireland): 2011, 2012, 2013
- European Ladies' Team Championship (representing Ireland): 2014, 2015, 2016, 2017, 2018
- Curtis Cup (representing Great Britain & Ireland): 2016 (winners), 2018
- Espirito Santo Trophy (representing Ireland): 2016
- Arnold Palmer Cup (representing the International team): 2018, 2020 (winners)
- Astor Trophy (representing Great Britain & Ireland): 2019
