= Puk Lyng Thomsen =

Danish golfer (born 1998)

Personal information
- Nationality: Denmark
- Born: 15 April 1998 (age 28) Fredrikshavn, Denmark
- Height: 5 ft 3 in (160 cm)

Career
- Sport: Golf
- College: Florida State University; Aalborg University
- Turned professional: 2022
- Current tour: LET Access Series (joined 2023)
- Professional wins: 1

Puk Lyng Thomsen (born 15 April 1998) is a Danish professional golfer. As an amateur she won the 2017 French Ladies Amateur and finished second individually in the 2016 Espirito Santo Trophy.

== Amateur career ==
Thomsen was born in Frederikshavn in 1998 and started playing golf when she was seven years old. At the age of 13, she was picked for the national team. By the time she accepted a golf scholarship to Florida State University in 2018, she was one of the most accomplished junior golfers in the world, and at 17th spot in the World Amateur Golf Rankings one of the top ranked players to ever sign for Florida State University.

Thomsen won the Danish Junior Matchplay Championship in 2011 and won her first international tournament in 2012, the Öijared Junior Open in Sweden. The next year, she appeared for Denmark in the European Young Masters and the European Girls' Team Championship. She appeared in the European Ladies' Team Championship six times between 2014 and 2019. In 2015, when it was held at Helsingør Golf Club in her home country, she won the individual stroke play qualifying event. She carded rounds of 71 and 65 to finish a single shot ahead of England's Alice Hewson and Finland's Matilda Castren, and in the process jumped into a tie for second place on the European Ranking behind leader Agathe Laisne.

As a result, Thomsen played for Team Europe in the 2015 Junior Solheim Cup held at Golf Club St. Leon-Rot in Germany. She also represented Europe in the Patsy Hankins Trophy against Asia/Pacific twice, in 2016 and 2018. In 2018, she was the only returning European player from 2016, along with Bianca Fabrizio and Frida Kinhult.

At the 2015 World Junior Girls Championship in Canada, she won the team silver, along with Cecilie Bofill and Line Toft Hansen. She finished in third place in the 2016 Portuguese International Ladies Amateur Championship, and third in the 2017 French International Lady Juniors Amateur Championship, where she shot a tournament personal best 3-under par 68 in the second round. She shot an all-tournament best 8-under par score of 64 in the final round to win the French International Ladies Amateur Championship ahead of Alessia Nobilio of Italy. She was runner-up in the European Nations Cup - Copa Sotogrande, in Spain.

In 2017, Thomsen also played in the Vagliano Trophy along with future fellow Seminole Morgane Metraux, and competed in the U.S. Women's Amateur. She finished in second place in the individual standings with a 12-under par total at the 2016 World Championships in Mexico, the 2016 Espirito Santo Trophy, and helped the Danish team with Marie Lund-Hansen and Malene Krølbøll Hansen secure fourth place.

=== College ===
Thomsen was one of five heralded recruits in head coach Amy Bond's best-ever recruiting class that arrived on the Florida State University campus in September 2018, having turned down an offer from Oklahoma State University. She was a part of a group of freshmen in the Florida State Seminoles women's golf team that included Frida Kinhult, Caroline Hodge, Amelia Williamson and Beatrice Wallin. With Thomsen in the lineup, Florida State tied the school-best for finishes in the ACC Championship (second) and the NCAA Auburn Regional Championship (second).

=== Injury ===
Thomsen's career was dealt a serious blow when a back injury she had been developing for six years got progressively worse. In the spring of 2020, she decided to end her Florida State Seminoles career after only two years, and moved back to Denmark for treatment. By May 2020, she couldn't even walk, and decided to undergo the same operation as Tiger Woods, a surgery designed to stabilize the lower part of her back. With the operation seemingly a success, following a year of rehabilitation, she competed in a small number of local tournaments in 2021. She completed her undergraduate degree at Aalborg University in 2025.

== Professional career ==
Thomsen turned professional in October 2022. She joined the 2023 LET Access Series, where she won the Västerås Ladies Open four strokes ahead of Kajsa Arwefjäll in second, and finished 8th in the season rankings to narrowly miss out on graduation to the Ladies European Tour.

== Amateur wins ==
- 2011 Danish Junior Matchplay Championship
- 2012 Öijared Junior Open
- 2013 Danish Junior Championship
- 2014 DGU Elite Tour Damer 1
- 2015 Danish National Strokeplay Championship
- 2016 Danish National Strokeplay Championship
- 2017 French International Ladies Amateur Championship, DGU Elite Tour 1, DGU Elite Tour Finale
- 2019 Danish International Ladies Amateur Championship

== Professional wins (1) ==
=== LET Access Series (1) ===
No.	Date	Tournament	Winning score	To par	Margin of victory	Runner-up	Ref
1	1 Jul 2023	Västerås Ladies Open	69-66-73=208	−8	4 strokes	(Sweden) Kajsa Arwefjäll (a)	

== Team appearances ==
Amateur

- European Young Masters (representing Denmark): 2013, 2014
- European Girls' Team Championship (representing Denmark): 2013
- European Ladies' Team Championship (representing Denmark): 2014, 2015, 2016, 2017, 2018, 2019
- Junior Solheim Cup (representing Europe): 2015
- Patsy Hankins Trophy (representing Europe): 2016, 2018
- Vagliano Trophy (representing the Continent of Europe): 2017 (winners)
- Espirito Santo Trophy (representing Denmark): 2016
