= Morgane Métraux =

Swiss professional golfer (born 1997)

Personal information
- Nationality: Switzerland
- Born: 18 March 1997 (age 29) Lausanne, Switzerland
- Height: 5 ft 8 in (173 cm)

Career
- Sport: Golf
- College: Florida State University
- Turned professional: 2018
- Current tours: LPGA Tour (joined 2022); Ladies European Tour (joined 2020)
- Former tour: Symetra Tour (joined 2018)
- Professional wins: 3

Number of wins by tour
- Ladies European Tour: 2
- Epson Tour: 1

Best results in LPGA major championships
- Chevron Championship: CUT: 2025
- Women's PGA C'ship: T36: 2025
- U.S. Women's Open: CUT: 2017
- Women's British Open: T23: 2025
- Evian Championship: T16: 2023

Morgane Métraux (born 18 March 1997) is a Swiss professional golfer who plays on the LPGA Tour and the Ladies European Tour (LET). In 2021, she won the Symetra Tour's Island Resort Championship, which helped her graduate to the LPGA Tour. In 2022, she won the Ladies Italian Open and in 2024 the Jabra Ladies Open in France.

== Amateur career ==
Métraux started playing golf at the age of ten, together with her sister Kim Métraux, who is also an LET member. At 15, she played in her first international event at the 2012 Junior Open Championship, made the cut and soon became part of the Swiss National Team.

She represented Switzerland at the 2013 European Girls' Team Championship and three European Ladies' Team Championships (2014, 2015, 2016), where the team won a silver (2015) and a bronze medal (2014). She also played in two editions of the Espirito Santo Trophy together with her sister in 2014 and in 2016, where the team won the silver medal behind South Korea. She also participated in the 2017 Vagliano Trophy in Bogogno, Italy, where her team (Continental Europe) won 15–9.

Individually, Métraux was runner-up at the 2013 Austrian International Amateur and won the 2015 Swiss International Championship. She participated in four European Ladies Amateur Championships, earning a third and fourth place in 2017 and 2016 respectively, signing for her career best score of 62 (–10) in the second round of the 2016 edition. Another amateur achievement was qualifying for the 2017 U.S. Women's Open in Bedminster, New Jersey.

Métraux graduated from Auguste Piccard High School in 2014 and in August, at the age of 17, joined Florida State University where she won three times individually in her junior year and six times with her team. During her career with Florida State Seminoles women's golf, she earned All-America honors for both her junior and senior years. Her best personal finish at the NCAA Division I Women's Golf Championships was a tie for 5th in 2018. She graduated in April 2018 with a degree in Business Management.

== Professional career ==
Métraux turned professional in May 2018, after completing her college career. She joined the Symetra Tour and played in 13 events and made 11 cuts, recording two T8 finishes at the IOA Golf Classic and the Donald Ross Classic at French Lick, Indiana, and ended her rookie season 47th on the money list.

In February 2019, Métraux injured her shoulder and missed out on the entire 2019 season. Her first event back was the 2020 LET Q-School, where she earned membership in Category 8 for the 2020 season. On the 2020 Ladies European Tour, she recorded a season-best finished of tenth at the inaugural Saudi Ladies International, helped by a final round of 67. She finished the season 45th on the Costa del Sol Order of Merit.

Métraux won her first professional tournament at the Island Resort Championship on the 2021 Symetra Tour, which also earned her exemption into the 2021 Evian Championship.

The win helped her climb past her sister in the Women's World Golf Rankings and qualify for the 2020 Summer Olympics in Tokyo. She later decided to opt out of playing in the Olympics, to focus on the Evian and the Symetra Tour, enabling her sister Kim Métraux to represent Switzerland alongside Albane Valenzuela. The decision paid off and Métraux was one of the Symetra Tour's top ten money winners at the end of the season, and gained a fully exempt card on the LPGA Tour for the 2022 season.

In 2022, she won the Ladies Italian Open after a playoff with Meghan MacLaren and Italian amateur Alessandra Fanali, before losing the Andalucia Costa Del Sol Open De España in a playoff to Caroline Hedwall. At the 2024 Jabra Ladies Open, she completed a second round of seven-under-par 64 on Saturday morning before bogeying three of her first four holes in the final round, to win the tournament by three strokes ahead of compatriot Chiara Tamburlini and Agathe Sauzon of France.

== Amateur wins ==
- 2013 Credit Suisse Junior Tour Event - Kandern
- 2015 Swiss International Championship
- 2016 The Schooner Fall Classic
- 2017 Seminole Match Up, Dickson Invitational

== Professional wins (3) ==
=== Ladies European Tour wins (2) ===
No.	Date	Tournament	Winning score	To par	Margin of victory	Runner(s)-up
1	4 Jun 2022	Ladies Italian Open	67-70-69=206	−10	Playoff	(Italy) Alessandra Fanali (a) (England) Meghan MacLaren
2	25 May 2024	Jabra Ladies Open	67-64-72=203	−10	3 strokes	(France) Agathe Sauzon (Switzerland) Chiara Tamburlini

Ladies European Tour playoff record (1–1)

No.	Year	Tournament	Opponent(s)	Result
1	2022	Ladies Italian Open	(Italy) Alessandra Fanali (a) (England) Meghan MacLaren	Won with eagle on first extra hole
2	2022	Andalucia Costa Del Sol Open De España	(Sweden) Caroline Hedwall	Lost to birdie on fourth extra hole

=== Symetra Tour wins (1) ===
No.	Date	Tournament	Winning score	To par	Margin of victory	Runner-up
1	13 Jun 2021	Island Resort Championship	69-63-67=199	−17	1 stroke	(Canada) Maude-Aimee Leblanc

== Results in LPGA majors ==
Tournament	2017	2018	2019	2020	2021	2022	2023	2024	2025	2026
Chevron Championship									CUT	
U.S. Women's Open	CUT									
Women's PGA Championship						CUT	T71	T70	T36	CUT
The Evian Championship				NT	CUT	T50	T16	CUT	CUT	
Women's British Open						CUT	T69	T76	T23	

Did not play

CUT = missed the half-way cut
NT = no tournament
T = tied

=== Summary ===
Tournament	Wins	2nd	3rd	Top-5	Top-10	Top-25	Events	Cuts made
Chevron Championship	0	0	0	0	0	0	1	0
U.S. Women's Open	0	0	0	0	0	0	1	0
Women's PGA Championship	0	0	0	0	0	0	5	3
The Evian Championship	0	0	0	0	0	1	5	2
Women's British Open	0	0	0	0	0	1	4	3
Totals	0	0	0	0	0	2	16	8

- Most consecutive cuts made – 4 (2023 Women's PGA – 2024 Women's PGA)

== Team appearances ==
Amateur

- European Young Masters (representing Switzerland): 2013
- European Girls' Team Championship (representing Switzerland): 2013
- European Ladies' Team Championship (representing Switzerland): 2014, 2015, 2016
- Espirito Santo Trophy (representing Switzerland): 2014, 2016
- Vagliano Trophy (representing the Continent of Europe): 2017 (winners)
