= 2015 European Ladies' Team Championship =

Golf competition

Tournament information
- Dates: 7–11 July 2015
- Location: Helsingør, Denmark; 56°03′00″N 12°34′33″E
- Course: Helsingør Golf Club
- Organized by: European Golf Association
- Format: 36 holes stroke play Knock-out match-play

Statistics
- Par: 71
- Length: 5,561 yards (5,085 m)
- Field: 21 teams 126 players

Champion
- France; Shannon Aubert, Mathilda Cappeliez, Justine Dreher, Manon Gidali, Ines Lescudier, Marion Veysseyre
- Qualification round: 716 (+6); Final match 4–3
- Location in Europe Location in Denmark Location in the Capital Region of Denmark

The 2015 European Ladies' Team Championship took place 7–11 July at Helsingør Golf Club in Helsingør, Denmark. It was the 32nd women's golf amateur European Ladies' Team Championship.

== Venue ==
The hosting club was founded in 1927 and the course, located 2 kilometres north-east of the city center of Helsingør, in the north-east corner of the island Zealand, Denmark, has been designed by Anders Amilion, John Harris and Anders Sørensen.

The club had previously hosted the 2007 Danish Ladies Masters on the Ladies European Tour.

The championship course was set up with par 71.

== Format ==
All participating teams played two qualification rounds of stroke-play with six players, counted the five best scores for each team.

The eight best teams formed flight A, in knock-out match-play over the next three days. The teams were seeded based on their positions after the stroke-play. The first placed team was drawn to play the quarter-final against the eighth placed team, the second against the seventh, the third against the sixth and the fourth against the fifth. In each match between two nation teams, two 18-hole foursome games and five 18-hole single games were played. Teams were allowed to switch players during the team matches, selecting other players in to the afternoon single games after the morning foursome games. Teams knocked out after the quarter-finals played one foursome game and four single games in each of their remaining matches. Games all square after 18 holes were declared halved, if the team match was already decided.

The eight teams placed 9–16 formed flight B and the five teams placed 17–21 formed flight C, to play similar knock-out match-play, with one foursome game and four single games, to decide their final positions.

== Teams ==
A record number of 21 nation teams contested the event. Each team consisted of six players. Luxemburg took part for the first time.

Players in the leading teams

Country	Players
Austria	Nadine Dreher, Ines Fendt, Ann Kathrin Maier, Anja Purgauer, Sarah Schober, Julia Unterweger
Belgium	Clara Aveling, Leslie Cloots, Fanny Cnops, Charlotte De Corte, Alicia Good, Elodie Van Dievoet
Denmark	Stephanie Bertelsen, Cecilie Bofill, Malene Krølbøll, Marie Lund Hansen, Puk Lyng Thomsen, Caroline Nistrup
England	Gemma Clews, Hayley Davis, Alice Hewson, Bronte Law, Meghan MacLaren, Charlotte Thomas
Finland	Matilda Castren, Emily Penttila, Petra Salko, Jenna Maihaniemi, Hannele Mikkola, Karina Kukkonen
France	Shannon Aubert, Mathilda Cappeliez, Justine Dreher, Manon Gidali, Ines Lescudier, Marion Veysseyre
Germany	Olivia Cowan, Quirine Eijkenboom, Franziska Friedrich, Laura Fünfstück, Lena Schäffner, Amina Wolf
Iceland	Gudrun Bjorgvinsdottir, Heidi Gudnadottir, Karen Gudnadottir, Ragnhildur Kristinsdóttir, Anna Snorradottir, Sunna Vidisdottir
Ireland	Jessica Carty, Maria Dunne, Paula Grant, Leona Maguire, Olivia Mehaffey, Chloe Ryan
Italy	Virginia Elena Carta, Lucrezia Colombotto Rosso, Bianca Maria Fabrizio, Ludovica Farina, Roberta Liti, Laura Lonardi
Luxembourg	Kim Jakobs, Jacqueline Klepper, Tessie Lessure, Anne-Marie Putz, Anne Schwartz, Christiane Wanderscheid
Netherlands	Myrte Eikenaar, Karin Jansen, Ileen Domela Nieuwenhuis, Floor Sinke, Giulia van den Berg, Dewi Weber
Norway	Mariell Bruun, Stine Pettersen, Stina Resen, Kristin Simonsen, Nicoline Skaug, Marthe Wold
Scotland	Connie Jaffrey, Jessica Meek, Heather Munro, Rachael Taylor, Rachel Walker, Clara Young
Slovakia	Zuzana Bielikova, Natalia Heckova, Lea Klimentova, Alexandra Patakova, Lina Sekerkova, Sara Zrnikova
Slovenia	Nastja Banovec, Ana Belac, Ema Grilc, Ursa Orehek, Katja Pogačar, Tasa Torbica
Spain	Celia Barquín Arozamena, Natalia Escuriola, Fátima Fernández Cano, Nuria Iturrioz, Noemí Jiménez, Luna Sobrón
Sweden	Jenny Haglund, Emma Henriksson, Linnea Johansson, Louise Ridderström, Madelene Sagström, Linnea Ström
Switzerland	Gioia Carpinelli, Natalie Karcher, Azelia Meichtry, Kim Métraux, Morgane Métraux, Albane Valenzuela
Turkey	Beyhan Benardete, Damla Bilgic, Tugce Erden, Sena Ersoy, Selin Timur, Begum Yilmaz
Wales	Samantha Birks, Rebecca Harries, Georgia Lewis, Bethan Morris, Katherine O'Connor, Chloe Williams

== Winners ==
Eight times champions England lead the opening 36-hole qualifying competition, with a score of even par 710, five strokes ahead of team Spain.

Individual leader in the 36-hole stroke-play competition was Puk Lyng Thomsen, Denmark, with a score of 6 under par 136, one stroke ahead of Matilda Castren, Finland and Alice Hewson, England.

Defending champions France won the championship, beating Switzerland 4–3 in the final and earned their eighth title. Switzerland played in their first final and reached the podium for the second time in a row, after finishing bronze medalist the previous year.

Team Spain earned third place, beating England 5–2 in the bronze match.

== Results ==
Qualification round

Team standings

Place	Country	Score	To par
1	England	358-352=710	E
2	Spain	366-349=715	+5
3	France	358-358=716	+6
4	Switzerland	357-361=718	+8
5	Sweden	369-352=721	+11
6	Germany	371-354=725	+15
7	Denmark	366-361=727	+17
8	Ireland	374-364=738	+28
9	Netherlands	371-368=739	+29
10	Italy	375-365=740	+30
11	Finland	375-371=746	+36
12	Slovenia	370-377=747	+37
13	Scotland	378-370=748	+38
14	Austria	378-371=749	+39
15	Turkey	376-377=753	+43
16	Belgium	380-374=754	+44
T17	Norway *	374-381=755	+45
T17	Wales	385-370=755	+45
19	Iceland	383-387=770	+60
20	Slovakia	387-392=779	+69
21	Luxembourg	438-433=871	+161

* Note: In the event of a tie the order was determined by the better total non-counting scores.

Individual leaders

Place	Player	Country	Score	To par
1	Puk Lyng Thomsen	Denmark	71-65=136	−6
T2	Matilda Castren	Finland	70-67=137	−5
T2	Alice Hewson	England	68-69=137	−5
4	Albane Valenzuela	Switzerland	68-70=138	−4
T5	Shannon Aubert	France	69-70=139	−3
T5	Fátima Fernández Cano	Spain	70-69=139	−3
T5	Meghan MacLaren	England	72-67=139	−3
T5	Madelene Sagström	Sweden	72-67=139	−3
T5	Rachel Taylor	Scotland	70-69=139	−3
T10	Laura Fünfstück	Germany	74-66=140	−2
T10	Katja Pogačar	Slovenia	73-67=140	−2

Note: There was no official award for the lowest individual score.

Flight A

Bracket

Quarter finals
England	4
Ireland	3
Switzerland	4.5
Sweden	2.5
France	6
Germany	1
Spain	4
Denmark	3

Semi finals
Switzerland	4.5
England	2.5
France	5
Spain	2

Final
France	4
Switzerland	3
Bronze match
Spain	5
England	2

Elimination matches
Sweden	4
Ireland	1
Germany	4
Denmark	1

Match for 5th place
Sweden	3.5
Germany	1.5
Match for 7th place
Denmark	3.5
Ireland	1.5

Final games

France	Switzerland
4	3
J. Dreher / S. Auber	K. Métraux / M. Métraux 2 holes
M. Gidali / M. Cappeliez 20th hole	N. Karcher / G. Carpinelli
Shannon Aubert	Gioia Carpinelli 2 & 1
Justine Dreher 2 & 1	Albane Valenzuela
Manon Gidali	Morgane Métraux 1 hole
Mathilda Cappeliez 7 & 6	Natalie Karcher
Ines Lescudier 1 hole	Kim Métraux

Flight B

Bracket

Round 1
Belgium	3
Netherlands	2
Scotland	3
Slovenia	2
Finland	3.5
Austria	1.5
Turkey	3
Italy	2

Round 2
Belgium	3.5
Scotland	1.5
Finland	4.5
Turkey	0.5

Match for 9th place
Finland	3.5
Belgium	1.5
Match for 11th place
Scotland	4
Turkey	1

Elimination matches
Slovenia	3
Netherlands	2
Italy	3
Austria	2

Match for 13th place
Italy	3.5
Slovenia	1.5
Match for 15th place
Austria	3.5
Netherlands	1.5

Flight C

Bracket

Round 1
Slovakia	4
Luxembourg	1
Wales	4
Iceland	1

Round 2
Norway	3
Slovakia	2
Wales
Direct to round 3

Match for 17th place
Wales	3
Norway	2
Match for 19th place
Iceland	3
Slovakia	2

Round 1

Elimination match
Iceland	4
Luxembourg	1

Final standings

Place	Country
1st place, gold medalist(s)	France
2nd place, silver medalist(s)	Switzerland
3rd place, bronze medalist(s)	Spain
4	England
5	Sweden
6	Germany
7	Denmark
8	Ireland
9	Finland
10	Belgium
11	Scotland
12	Turkey
13	Italy
14	Slovenia
15	Austria
16	Netherlands
17	Wales
18	Norway
19	Iceland
20	Slovakia
21	Luxembourg

== See also ==
- Espirito Santo Trophy – biennial world amateur team golf championship for women organized by the International Golf Federation.
- European Amateur Team Championship – European amateur team golf championship for men organised by the European Golf Association.
- European Ladies Amateur Championship – European amateur individual golf championship for women organised by the European Golf Association.
