= 2014 Espirito Santo Trophy =

Tournament information
- Dates: 2–7 September
- Location: Karuizawa, Japan; 36.312°N 138.632°E
- Courses: Karuizawa 72 Golf East (Iriyama and Oshitate courses)
- Organized by: International Golf Federation
- Format: 72 holes stroke play

Statistics
- Par: Iriyama: 72; Oshitate: 72
- Length: Iriyama: 5,768 yards (5,274 m); Oshitate: 6,309 yards (5,769 m)
- Field: 53 teams 157 players

Champion
- Australia; Minjee Lee, Su-Hyun Oh, Shelly Shin
- 547 (−29)

Location map
- Location in Japan

The 2014 Espirito Santo Trophy took place 2–7 September at the Karuizawa 72 Golf East, on its Iriyama and Oshitate courses in Karuizawa, Japan.

It was the 26th women's golf World Amateur Team Championship for the Espirito Santo Trophy.

The tournament was a 72-hole stroke play team event. There were 50 team entries, each with two or three players.

Each team played two rounds at the Iriyama Course and two rounds at the Oshitate Course. The leading teams played the fourth round at Iriyama. The best two scores for each round counted towards the team total.

Team Australia won their third title, with a 29-under-par score of 547, two strokes ahead of silver medalist team Canada. Defending champions, team South Korea, took the bronze medal on third place one more stroke back.

The individual title went to 16-year-old Brooke Henderson, Canada, whose score of 19-under-par 269 was a championship record and three strokes ahead of Minjee Lee, Australia on second place.

== Teams ==
50 teams entered the event and completed the competition. Each team had three players, except three teams. The teams representing Bolivia, Gabon and Serbia only had two players each.

Country	Players
Argentina	Delfina Acosta, Manuela Carbajo Re, Magdalena Simmermacher
Australia	Minjee Lee, Su-Hyun Oh, Shelly Shin
Austria	Leonie Bettel, Nadine Dreher, Lea Zeitler
Belgium	Leslie Cloots, Fanny Cnops, Manon De Roey
Bolivia	Michelle Ledermann, Tamara Paz
Brazil	Luiza Altmann, Luciane Lee, Clara Teixeira
Canada	Brooke Henderson, Augusta James, Brittany Marchand
Czech Republic	Barbora Bakova, Hana Ryskova, Karolina Vlckova
China	Yuting Shi, XinYing Wang, Ziqi Ye
Chinese Taipei	Chi-Hui Chen, Ssu-Chia Cheng, Jo-Hua Hung
Colombia	Laura Camila Blanco, Maria Hoyos, Laura Sojo
Denmark	Nanna Koerstz Madsen, Caroline Nistrup, Emily Kristine Pedersen
England	Gabriella Cowley, Hayley Davis, Bronte Law
Finland	Matilda Castren, Emily Penttila, Oona Vartiainen
France	Céline Boutier, Mathilda Cappeliez, Manon Gidali
Gabon	Lea Ndjobouela, Corine Beyeme
Germany	Olivia Cowan, Laura Fünfstück, Antonia Scherer
Guam	Kristin Oberiano, Rachael Peterson, Nalathai Vongjalorn
Guatemala	Beatriz Arenas, Pilar Echeverria, Lucía Polo
Hong Kong	Tiffany Chan, Isabella Leung, Kitty Tam
Iceland	Gudrun Bjorgvinsdóttir, Ólafía Þórunn Kristinsdóttir, Sunna Vidisdóttir
India	Aditi Ashok, Astha Madan, Gurbani Singh
Ireland	Mary Doyle, Maria Dunne, Paula Grant
Italy	Virginia Elena Carta, Roberta Liti, Laura Lonardi
Japan	Minami Katsu, Yumi Matsubara, Eri Okayama
Mexico	Maria Gabriela Lopez Butron, Marijosse Navarro Miguez, Ana Paula Valdes
Netherlands	Romy Meekers, Anne van Dam, Dewi Weber
New Zealand	Julianne Alvarez, Zoe-Beth Brake, Munchin Keh
Norway	Mariell Bruun, Tonje Daffinrud, Nicoline Skaug
Philippines	Pauline Del Rosario, Clare Amelia Legaspi, Princess Superal
Poland	Dominika Gradecka, Nastasia Kossacky, Dorota Zalewska
Portugal	Ines Barbosa, Leonor Bessa, Susana Mendes Ribeiro
Puerto Rico	Valeria S. Pacheco, Paola Robles, Maria F. Torres
Russia	Sofya Anokhina, Ksenia Eremina, Angelina Monakhova
Scotland	Eilidh Briggs, Gemma Dryburgh, Gabrielle MacDonald
Serbia	Ariana Savic, Tamara Palkovljevic
Singapore	Sock Hwee Koh, Jo Ee Kok, Amanda Tan
Slovakia	Aneta Abrahamova, Natalia Heckova, Lea Klimentova
Slovenia	Ana Belac, Ursa Oreheu, Katja Pogačar
South Africa	Michaela Fletcher, Cara Bella Gorlei, Monja Richards
South Korea	Choi Hye-jin, Lee So-young, Park Gyeol
Spain	Noemí Jiménez Martín, Marta Sanz Barrio, Luna Sobrón Galmés
Sweden	Louise Ridderström, Madelene Sagström, Linnea Ström
Switzerland	Albane Valenzuela, Kim Métraux, Morgane Métraux
Thailand	Pajaree Anannarukarn, Suthavee Chanachai, Pannarat Thanapolboonyaras
Turkey	Damla Bilgic, Sena Ersoy, Elcin Ulu
Ukraine	Maria Pedenko, Valeriia Sapronova, Galyna Zagorodnia
United States	Kristen Gillman, Alison Lee, Emma Talley
Venezuela	Nicole Ferre, Ariadna Fonseca, Maria Andreina Merchan
Wales	Katie Bradbury, Rebecca Helen Harries, Chloe Williams

== Results ==
Place	Country	Score	To par
1st place, gold medalist(s)	Australia	144-138-134-131=547	−29
2nd place, silver medalist(s)	Canada	135-139-135-140=549	−27
3rd place, bronze medalist(s)	South Korea	137-140-134-139=550	−26
4	Denmark	143-139-136-138=556	−20
T5	Sweden	143-135-141-138=557	−19
T5	United States	142-140-136-139=557	−19
7	Mexico	142-139-139-140=560	−16
T8	England	147-134-139-142=562	−14
T8	Japan	144-132-139-147=562	−14
10	Philippines	143-143-135-142=563	−13
T11	France	140-142-143-139=564	−12
T11	Germany	143-136-140-145=564	−12
13	Spain	142-136-139-149=566	−10
14	China	146-140-139-142=567	−9
15	Italy	141-147-136-146=570	−6
16	Norway	148-143-138-142=571	−5
T17	Finland	145-144-139-144=572	−4
T17	India	141-140-143-148=572	−4
19	Netherlands	143-145-138-147=573	−3
T20	Argentina	145-146-145-140=576	E
T20	Chinese Taipei	146-148-139-143=576	E
T22	Belgium	147-145-145-144=581	+5
T22	Slovenia	148-146-146-141=581	+5
24	Austria	146-142-145-149=582	+6
T25	Colombia	147-142-148-146=583	+7
T25	Puerto Rico	147-146-145-145=583	+7
T25	Wales	146-144-145-148=583	+7
28	Thailand	152-145-139-148=584	+8
T29	Hong Kong	146-151-143-148=588	+12
T29	Iceland	149-147-144-148=588	+12
T29	South Africa	142-144-152-150=588	+12
32	Switzerland	146-149-150-147=592	+16
33	Ireland	141-150-146-156=593	+17
34	New Zealand	154-138-149-154=595	+19
35	Czech Republic	150-154-149-146=599	+23
T36	Brazil	150-151-153-147=601	+25
T36	Poland	148-154-148-151=601	+25
T36	Singapore	150-146-147-158=601	+25
39	Russia	149-153-148-156=606	+30
40	Scotland	154-151-152-151=608	+32
41	Venezuela	153-153-155-149=610	+34
42	Guatemala	151-149-155-159=614	+38
43	Turkey	155-157-155-150=617	+41
44	Slovakia	151-153-159-155=618	+42
45	Portugal	167-154-157-151=629	+53
46	Guam	164-168-160-155=647	+71
47	Bolivia	162-165-163-161=651	+75
48	Serbia	171-174-176-171=692	+116
49	Ukraine	185-196-183-184=748	+172
50	Gabon	183-198-181-187=749	+173

== Individual leaders ==
There was no official recognition for the lowest individual scores.

Place	Player	Country	Score	To par
1	Brooke Henderson	Canada	66-69-66-68=269	−19
2	Minjee Lee	Australia	73-70-64-65=272	−16
T3	Bronte Law	England	71-65-67-71=274	−14
T3	Alison Lee	United States	68-70-68-68=274	−14
5	Su-Hyun Oh	Australia	71-68-70-66=275	−13
T6	Maria Gabriela Lopez Butron	Mexico	69-68-69-70=276	−12
T6	Linnea Ström	Sweden	71-67-71-67=276	−12
T6	Anne Van Dam	Netherlands	68-69-67-72=276	−12
T9	Choi Hye-jin	South Korea	70-71-66-71=278	−10
T9	Tonje Daffinrud	Norway	72-70-66-70=278	−10
T9	Lee So-young	South Korea	67-69-70-72=278	−10
