= Shannon Aubert =

French amateur golfer

Personal information
- Nationality: France
- Born: 1995 (age 30–31) Annecy, France

Career
- Sport: Golf
- College: Stanford University
- Status: Amateur

Best results in LPGA major championships
- Chevron Championship: DNP
- Women's PGA C'ship: DNP
- U.S. Women's Open: CUT: 2012, 2013
- Women's British Open: DNP
- Evian Championship: DNP

Shannon Aubert (born 1995) is a French amateur golfer. She was born in Annecy, France to a South African mother, Monica, and French father, Christian. She holds a South African, French and Irish passport, and speaks four languages fluently. She started playing golf at the age of 7, first representing the South African National team, and then joined the French National Team at 12.

Aubert had various accomplishments as an amateur, representing Europe at the Junior Solheim Cup, representing France at the Espirito Santo Trophy, and while she never won on the AJGA, she did finish First Team All-American three times, with over 20 top-10 finishes to her record. She has represented France in national Team events since the age of 14, being part of the women's team that competed in and won in 2014 and 2015, and finished runner-up in 2018 European Ladies' Team Championship. She qualified for two U.S. Women's Opens at the age of 16 and 17, and won the Dixie Amateur in 2013, her biggest win as a junior.

Aubert then went to play college golf at Stanford University and graduated in 2018. She was part of the 2015 National Championship Team, winning all three of her matches, part of the 2016 runner-up team, and the 2017 and 2018 third place teams. She is the only collegiate golfer to have participated in four national championships where the team reached at least the semi-finals.

Aubert tied the stroke play scoring record at the 2017 U.S. Women's Amateur, but lost to Lucy Li in the round of 16.

== Amateur wins ==
- 2012 Spanish International Stroke Play
- 2013 Dixie Women's Amateur, Kathy Whitworth Invitational
- 2017 Florida Women's Amateur Championship

== Team appearances ==
- European Girls' Team Championship (representing France): 2011 (winners), 2012, 2013
- Junior Vagliano Trophy: (representing the Continent of Europe): 2011 (winners)
- Espirito Santo Trophy (representing France): 2012
- Junior Solheim Cup (representing Europe): 2013
- European Ladies' Team Championship (representing France): 2014 (winners), 2015 (winners), 2016, 2017, 2018
