= Dorota Zalewska =

Polish professional golfer (born 1999)

Personal information
- Nationality: Poland
- Born: 27 October 1999 (age 27) Szczecin, Poland
- Height: 165 cm (5 ft 5 in)

Career
- Sport: Golf
- College: University of Tennessee at Chattanooga
- Turned professional: 2023
- Current tours: Ladies European Tour (joined 2024); LET Access Series (joined 2025)

Dorota Zalewska (born 27 October 1999) is a Polish professional golfer and Ladies European Tour (LET) player. She is the first from her country to earn a full LET card.

== Amateur career ==
Zalewska was born in Szczecin. She started playing golf at the age of 10 at Modry Las G&CC, and became the most decorated female player in the country's history. She won the Polish Junior Championship, and the Polish Match Play and Polish Ladies' Open Amateur Championships multiple times. In 2022, she won the German International Amateur.

Zalewska joined the national team at the age of 13, and appeared for Poland twice at the European Ladies' Team Championship, and four times at the Espirito Santo Trophy around the world.

Zalewska was enrolled at the University of Tennessee at Chattanooga from 2018 to 2023, and played with the Chattanooga Mocs women's golf team. She recorded four wins including the SoCon Women's Golf Championship and the 2023 NCAA Raleigh Regional, which saw her qualify individually for the 2023 NCAA Division I women's golf championship.

== Professional career ==
Zalewska turned professional in 2023 and finished top-20 at Q-School to join the 2024 Ladies European Tour. After a couple of top-20 finishes, she ended her rookie season 108th in the LET Order of Merit and 14th in the Rookie of the Year rankings.

In 2025, she shared the lead at the Dutch Ladies Open after an opening round of 68 (−4).

== Amateur wins ==
- 2015 Polish Junior Championship
- 2016 Polish Match Play Championship
- 2017 Polish Match Play Championship
- 2018 Polish Ladies' Open Amateur Championship
- 2019 Kram Junior Open
- 2020 Kram Junior Open, The Terrier Intercollegiate
- 2022 Brickyard Collegiate, SoCon Women's Golf Championship, Polish Ladies' Open Amateur Championship, German International Amateur
- 2023 NCAA Raleigh Reigional

== Team appearances ==
Amateur

- Espirito Santo Trophy: (representing Poland): 2014, 2016, 2018, 2022
- European Ladies' Team Championship: (representing Poland): 2016, 2022
