= 2016 Espirito Santo Trophy =

Tournament information
- Dates: 14–17 September
- Location: Playa del Carmen, Quintana Roo, Mexico; 20.6895°N 87.0312°W
- Courses: Mayakoba El Camaleon Golf Club and Iberostar Playa Paraiso Golf Club
- Organized by: International Golf Federation
- Format: 72 holes stroke play

Statistics
- Par: Mayakoba: 72; Iberostar: 72
- Length: Mayakoba: 6,295 yards (5,756 m); Iberostar: 6,167 yards (5,639 m)
- Field: 55 teams 163 players

Champion
- South Korea; Choi Hye-jin, Park Hyun-kyung, Park Min-ji
- 547 (−29)
- Location in Mexico Location in Quintana Roo

The 2016 Espirito Santo Trophy took place 14–17 September at Mayakoba El Camaleon Golf Club and Iberostar Playa Paraiso Golf Club in Playa del Carmen, Quintana Roo, Mexico.

It was the 27th women's golf World Amateur Team Championship for the Espirito Santo Trophy.

The tournament was a 72-hole stroke play team event. There were a record 55 team entries, each with up to three players. Two nations, Bulgaria and Morocco, made their first appearances at the Espirito Santo Trophy.

Each team played two rounds at Mayakoba and two rounds at Iberostar in different orders, but all leading teams played the fourth round at Mayakoba. The best two scores for each round counted towards the team total.

The South Korea team won the trophy for their fourth title and third win in the last four events, beating team Switzerland by 21 strokes. Switzerland, with two sisters, Kim and Morgan Metraux, in the team, earned the silver medal while the Ireland team took the bronze on third place another stroke back.

The individual title went to 17-year-old Choi Hye-jin, South Korea, whose score of 14-under-par, 274, was two strokes ahead of Puk Lyng Thomsen, Denmark.

== Teams ==
55 teams entered the event and completed the competition. Each team had three players except two teams. The teams representing Bolivia and Latvia each had only two players.

Country	Players
Argentina	Ela Anacona, Magdalena Simmermacher, Agustina Zeballos
Australia	Robyn Choi, Karis Davidson, Hannah Green
Austria	Leonie Bettel, Ines Fendt, Emma Spitz
Belgium	Diane Baillieux, Leslie Cloots, Clarisse Louis
Bolivia	Michelle Ledermann, Daniela Siles
Brazil	Luiza Altmann, Lauren Grinberg, Clara Teixeira
Bulgaria	Sofia Seldemirova, Ivana Simeonova, Stefani Skokanska
Canada	Josee Doyon, Naomi Ko, Maddie Szeryk
Czech Republic	Kristyna Frydlova, Katerina Vlasinova, Karolina Vlckova
Chile	Maria Jose Hurtado, Isidora Nilsson, Natalia Villavicencio
China	Yifan Ji, Wenbo Liu, Shan Pan
Chinese Taipei	Ya-Chun Chang, Ching-Tzu Chen, Jo-Hua Hung
Colombia	Cynthia Diaz, Silvia Garces, Laura Sojo
Costa Rica	Daniela Baudrit, Pamela Calderon, Ximena Montealegre
Denmark	Malene Krølbøll Hansen, Marie Lund-Hansen, Puk Lyng Thomsen
Ecuador	Coralia Arias, Daniela Darquea, Anika Veintemilla
England	Gemma Clews, Alice Hewson, Meghan MacLaren
Finland	Daniella Barrett, Matilda Castren, Emily Pentilla
France	Mathilda Cappeliez, Agathe Laisné, Pauline Roussin-Bouchard
Germany	Antonia Eberhard, Sophie Hausmann, Esther Henseleit
Guam	Kristin Oberiano, Rachael Peterson, Rose Tarpley
Guatemala	Pilar Echeverra, Valeria Mendizabal, Lucia Polo
Hong Kong	Tiffany Chan, Michelle Cheung, Mimi Ho
Iceland	Guðrún Brá Björgvinsdóttir, Berglind Bjornsdóttir, Signy Arnorsdóttir
India	Gaurika Bishnoi, Diksha Dagar, Tvesa Malik
Ireland	Leona Maguire, Olivia Mehaffey, Annabel Wilson
Italy	Bianca Fabrizio, Laura Lonardi, Carlotta Ricolfi
Japan	Hina Arakaki, Nasa Hataoka, Yumi Matsubara
Latvia	Laila Forstmane, Anna Diana Svanka
Mexico	María Fassi, Isabella Fierro, Ana Paula Valdes
Morocco	Houria El Abbadi, Lina Belmati, Ines Laklalech
Netherlands	Zhen Bontan, Roos Haarman, Dewi Weber
New Zealand	Julianne Alvarez, Chantelle Cassidy, Wenyung Keh
Norway	Renate Grimstad, Stina Resen, Marthe Wold
Paraguay	Milagros Chaves, Maria Fernanda Escauriza, Sofia García
Peru	Micaela Farah, Lucia Gutierrez, Maria Salinas Valle
Poland	Dominika Gradecka, Nastasia Kossacky, Dorota Zalewska
Puerto Rico	Valeria Sofia Pacheco, Yudika Ann Rodriguez, Maria Fernanda Torres
Russia	Sofia Anokhina, Vera Markevich, Sofya Morozova
Scotland	Connie Jaffrey, Jessica Meek, Rachael Taylor
Slovakia	Natalia Heckova, Laila Hrindova, Lea Klimentova
Slovenia	Nastja Banovec, Ana Belac, Katja Pogačar
South Africa	Cara Gorlei, Ivanna Samu, Kaleigh Telfer
South Korea	Choi Hye-jin, Park Hyun-kyung, Park Min-ji
Spain	Harang Lee, María Parra, Luna Sobron
Sweden	Frida Gustafsson Spång, Emma Henrikson, Linnea Ström
Switzerland	Azelia Meichtry, Kim Métraux, Morgane Métraux
Thailand	Pajaree Anannarukarn, Kanyalak Preedasuttijit, Manuschaya Zeemakorn
Tunisia	Nour Ben Cherif, Kenza Ladhari, Hadia Mansouri
Turkey	Tugce Erden, Sena Ersoy, Selin Timur
Ukraine	Anna Avdieieva, Daria Horokhovska, Elvira Rastvortseva
United States	Katelyn Dambaugh, Mariel Galdiano, Andrea Lee
Uruguay	Sofia Garcia Austt, Manuela Barros, Priscilla Schmid
Venezuela	Nicole Ferre, Stephanie Gellini, Valentina Gilly
Wales	Megan Lockett, Katherine O'Connor, Chloe Williams

== Results ==
Place	Country	Score	To par
1st place, gold medalist(s)	South Korea	138-137-138-134=547	−29
2nd place, silver medalist(s)	Switzerland	137-145-145-141=568	−8
3rd place, bronze medalist(s)	Ireland	146-141-145-137=569	−7
4	Denmark	151-137-144-138=570	−6
5	Thailand	145-143-143-141=571	−5
6	United States	146-145-145-138=574	−2
7	Spain	151-143-141-140=575	−1
8	Japan	142-153-144-137=576	E
9	Canada	149-144-145-143=581	+5
10	Mexico	144-148-146-144=582	+6
11	Belgium	153-149-142-140=584	+8
T12	Australia	147-147-149-144=587	+11
T12	China	143-147-151-146=587	+11
T14	Chinese Taipei	146-152-146-144=588	+12
T14	Italy	147-151-148-142=588	+12
16	Sweden	148-148-149-145=589	+13
T17	Czech Republic	148-150-146-146=590	+14
T17	England	147-150-147-146=590	+14
19	New Zealand	147-147-146-152=592	+16
20	Norway	147-152-149-146=594	+18
21	Austria	146-145-157-147=595	+19
T22	Ecuador	147-153-149-147=596	+20
T22	Paraguay	148-146-148-154=596	+20
24	Colombia	151-151-145-151=598	+22
T25	Puerto Rico	147-155-149-148=599	+23
T25	South Africa	148-155-142-154=599	+23
T27	France	152-152-149-147=600	+24
T27	Germany	150-153-150-147=600	+24
T27	Scotland	156-149-146-149=600	+24
30	Netherlands	149-155-146-151=601	+25
31	India	154-146-150-152=602	+26
T32	Argentina	159-148-145-151=603	+27
T32	Finland	150-153-150-150=603	+27
T34	Hong Kong	148-154-154-151=607	+31
T34	Russia	159-148-154-146=607	+31
36	Brazil	149-153-154-154=610	+34
37	Peru	152-154-152-153=611	+35
T38	Slovakia	157-151-154-154=616	+40
T38	Venezuela	157-153-150-156=616	+40
40	Wales	157-155-147-159=618	+42
41	Uruguay	162-161-147-149=619	+43
42	Slovenia	157-162-148-153=620	+44
T43	Guatemala	159-150-154-160=623	+47
T43	Iceland	156-165-145-157=623	+47
T45	Chile	159-154-162-154=626	+50
T45	Turkey	156-154-162-154=626	+50
47	Morocco	159-161-155-158=633	+57
48	Poland	158-156-164-161=639	+63
49	Bolivia	165-167-156-162=650	+74
50	Latvia	165-175-160-164=664	+88
51	Bulgaria	174-172-158-166=670	+94
52	Guam	172-174-171-161=678	+102
53	Ukraine	173-178-183-180=714	+138
54	Costa Rica	183-178-176-179=716	+140
55	Tunisia	185-181-175-177=718	+142

== Individual leaders ==
There was no official recognition for the lowest individual scores.

Place	Player	Country	Score	To par
1	Choi Hye-jin	South Korea	70-69-68-67=274	−14
2	Puk Lyng Thomsen	Denmark	73-67-70-66=276	−12
3	Kim Métraux	Switzerland	69-72-69-69=279	−9
3	Park Min-ji	South Korea	74-68-70-67=279	−9
5	Daniela Darquea	Ecuador	71-72-70-68=281	−7
T6	Naomi Ko	Canada	75-66-71-70=282	−6
T6	Leona Maguire	Ireland	72-70-71-69=282	−6
T8	Leslie Cloots	Belgium	76-70-68-69=283	−5
T8	María Parra	Spain	75-70-70-68=283	−5
10	Park Hyun-kyung	South Korea	68-75-71-71=285	−3
