= 2014 European Ladies' Team Championship =

Golf competition

Tournament information
- Dates: 8–12 July 2014
- Location: Ljubljana, Slovenia; 46°09′05″N 14°26′40″E
- Course: Diners CUBO Golf Course
- Organized by: European Golf Association
- Format: 36 holes stroke play Knock-out match-play

Statistics
- Par: 71
- Length: 5,941 yards (5,432 m)
- Field: 20 teams 120 players

Champion
- France; Shannon Aubert, Alexandra Bonetti, Céline Boutier, Emma Broze, Anaelle Carnet, Justine Dreher
- Qualification round: 718 (+8); Final match 4 1/2–2 1/2

Location map
- Location in Europe Location in Slovenia

The 2014 European Ladies' Team Championship took place 8–12 July at Diners CUBO Golf Course in Ljubljana, Slovenia. It was the 31st women's golf amateur European Ladies' Team Championship.

== Venue ==
The course, located in Smlednik, in flat terrain without trees on the course, 12 kilometres north-east of the city center of Ljubljana, Slovenia, was designed by architect Peter Škofic and opened with 18 holes in 2009.

The course had previously hosted the 2012 individual European Ladies Amateur Championship.

The championship course was set up with par 71.

== Format ==
All participating teams played two qualification rounds of stroke-play with six players, counted the five best scores for each team.

The eight best teams formed flight A, in knock-out match-play over the next three days. The teams were seeded based on their positions after the stroke-play. The first placed team was drawn to play the quarter-final against the eight placed team, the second against the seventh, the third against the sixth and the fourth against the fifth. In each match between two nation teams, two 18-hole foursome games and five 18-hole single games were played. Teams were allowed to switch players during the team matches, selecting other players in to the afternoon single games after the morning foursome games. Teams knocked out after the quarter-finals played one foursome game and four single games in each of their remaining matches. Games all square after 18 holes were declared halved, if the team match was already decided.

The eight teams placed 9–16 in the qualification stroke-play formed flight B, to play similar knock-out match-play, with one foursome game and four single games, to decide their final positions.

The four teams placed 17–20 in the qualification stroke-play formed flight C, to meet each other, with one foursome game and four single games, to decide their final positions.

== Teams ==
20 nation teams contested the event. Each team consisted of six players. Turkey took part for the first time.

Players in the teams

Country	Players
Austria	Nadine Dreher, Michaela Gasplmayr, Marlies Krenn, Anja Purgauer, Sarah Schober, Fanny Wolte
Belgium	Clara Aveling, Leslie Cloots, Fanny Cnops, Charlotte de Corte, Elodie van Dievoet, Manon De Roey
Denmark	Cecilie Bofill, Malene Krølbøll Hansen, Nanna Koerstz Madsen, Caroline Nistrup, Christine Skylvad, Puk Lyng Thomsen
England	Gabriella Cowley, Hayley Davis, Bronte Law, Meghan MacLaren, Elizabeth Mallet, Charlotte Thomas
Finland	Matilda Castren, Karina Kukkonen, Sanna Nuutinen, Emily Penttila, Oona Vartiainen, Marika Voss
France	Shannon Aubert, Alexandra Bonetti, Céline Boutier, Emma Broze, Anaelle Carnet, Justine Dreher
Germany	Olivia Cowan, Franziska Friedrich, Laura Fünfstück, Thea Hoffmeister, Sophia Popov, Antonia Scherer
Ireland	Jessica Carty, Mary Doyle, Maria Dunne, Paula Grant, Olivia Mehaffey, Chloe Ryan
Italy	Alessandra Braida, Bianca Maria Fabrizio, Ludovica Farina, Roberta Liti, Laura Lonardi, Arianna Scaletti
Netherlands	Annie van Dam, Myrte Eikenaar, Ileen Domela Nieuwenhuis, Charlotte Puts, Martien Schipper, Dewi Weber
Iceland	Signy Arnolsdóttir, Bra Bjorgvinsdóttir, Berglind Bjornsdóttir, Ólafía Kristinsdóttir, Ragnhildur Kristinsdóttir, Sunna Vidisdóttir
Russia	Sofia Anokhina, Ksnia Ishkova, Vera Markevich, Angelina Monakhova, Sofia Morozova, Nina Pegova
Scotland	Eilidh Briggs, Gemma Dryburgh, Connie Jaffrey, Gabrielle MacDonald, Alyson McKechin, Jessica Meek
Slovakia	Aneta Abrahamova, Zuzana Bielikova, Katka Chovankova, Natalia Heckova, Alexandra Patakova, Lina Sekerkova
Slovenia	Nastja Banovec, Ana Belac, Ema Grilc, Lara Ječnik, Katja Pogačar, Taša Torbica
Spain	Natalia Escuriola, Camilla Hedberg, Nuria Iturrioz, Noemí Jiménez, Marta Sanz, Luna Sobrón
Sweden	Frida Gustafsson Spång, Jenny Haglund, Emma Henriksson, Linnea Johansson, Madelene Sagström, Linnea Ström
Switzerland	Gioia Carpinelli, Cylia Damerau, Kim Métraux, Morgane Métraux, Nina von Siebenthal, Albane Valenzuela
Turkey	Beyhan Benardete, Damla Bilgic, Sezgi Kilic, Nergis Kok, Elcin Ulu, Begum Yilmaz
Wales	Samantha Birks, Jessica Evans, Rebecca Harries, Lauren Hiller, Megan Lockett, Chloe Williams

== Winners ==
Eight times champions England lead the opening 36-hole qualifying competition, with a score of 7 under par 703, six strokes ahead of team Sweden.

Individual leader in the 36-hole stroke-play competition was Hayley Davis, England, with a score of 8 under par 134, three strokes ahead of nearest competitors.

Team France won the championship, beating Finland 4 1/2–2 1/2 in the final and earned their seventh title.

Switzerland earned third place, beating England 4–3 in the bronze match.

== Results ==
Qualification round

Team standings

Place	Country	Score	To par
1	England	352-351=703	−7
2	Sweden	354-355=709	−1
3	Finland	358-359=717	+7
4	France	356-362=718	+8
5	Spain	356-364=720	+10
6	Germany	358-368=726	+16
T7	Switzerland *	355-372=727	+17
T7	Italy *	354-373=727	+17
T7	Denmark	364-363=727	+17
10	Ireland	362-367=729	+19
11	Iceland	366-366=732	+22
12	Belgium	363-373=736	+26
13	Austria	373-364=737	+27
14	Wales	367-373=740	+30
15	Netherlands	375-366=741	+31
16	Scotland	369-375=744	+34
17	Slovenia	373-377=750	+40
18	Slovakia	384-382=766	+56
19	Russia	381-389=770	+60
20	Turkey	403-400=803	+93

* Note: In the event of a tie the order was determined by the better total non-counting scores.

Individual leaders

Place	Player	Country	Score	To par
1	Hayley Davis	England	69-65=134	−8
T2	Cecilie Bofill	Denmark	67-70=137	−5
T2	Natalia Escuriola	Spain	67-70=137	−5
4	Emma Henriksson	Sweden	71-67=138	−4
5	Bronte Law	England	68-71=139	−3
T6	Anaelle Carnet	France	68-72=140	−2
T6	Gabriella Cowley	England	69-71=140	−2
T6	Maria Dunne	Ireland	72-68=140	−2
T6	Noemí Jiménez	Spain	71-69=140	−2
T6	Louise Ridderström	Sweden	68-72=140	−2
T6	Antonia Scherer	Germany	71-69=140	−2
T6	Oona Vartiainen	Finland	69-71=140	−2

Note: There was no official award for the lowest individual score.

Flight A

Bracket

Quarter finals
England	4
Italy	3
France	5
Spain	2
Finland	5
Germany	2
Switzerland	4
Sweden	3

Semi finals
France	4
England	3
Finland	5.5
Switzerland	1.5

Final
France	4.5
Finland	2.5
Bronze match
Switzerland	4.5
England	2.5

Elimination matches
Italy	3.5
Spain	1.5
Sweden	3
Germany	2

Match for 5th place
Italy	3
Sweden	2
Match for 7th place
Spain	3
Germany	2

Final games

France	Finland
4.5	2.5
E. Broze / A. Carnet	S. Nuutinen / O. Vartiainen 2 & 1
S. Aubert / C. Boutier 6 & 5	M. Castren / M. Voss
Celine Boutier 3 & 2	Oona Vartiainen
Alexandra Bonetti	Sanna Nuutinen 3 & 1
Shannon Aubert AS *	Karina Kukkonen AS *
Emma Broze 1 hole	Matilda Castren
Justine Dreher 2 holes	Emily Penttila

* Note: Game declared halved, since team match already decided.

Flight B

Bracket

Round 1
Denmark	3
Scotland	2
Belgium	3.5
Austria	1.5
Wales	3
Iceland	2
Ireland	3
Netherlands	2

Round 2
Belgium	3
Denmark	2
Wales	3
Ireland	2

Match for 9th place
Belgium	3.5
Wales	1.5
Match for 11th place
Denmark	3.5
Ireland	1.5

Elimination matches
Scotland	4.5
Austria	0.5
Netherlands	3
Iceland	2

Match for 13th place
Scotland	5
Netherlands	0
Match for 15th place
Austria	3.5
Iceland	1.5

Flight C

Team matches

1	Slovenia	Turkey	0
4		1	

1	Slovakia	Russia	0
3		2	

1	Slovenia	Russia	0
3.5		1.5	

1	Slovakia	Turkey	0
4		1	

1	Slovenia	Slovakia	0
3		2	

1	Russia	Turkey	0
3.5		1.5	

Team standings

Country	Place	W	T	L	Game points	Points
Slovenia	17	3	0	0	10.5–4.5	3
Slovakia	18	2	0	1	9–6	2
Russia	19	1	0	2	7–8	1
Turkey	20	0	0	3	3.5–11.5	0

Final standings

Place	Country
1st place, gold medalist(s)	France
2nd place, silver medalist(s)	Finland
3rd place, bronze medalist(s)	Switzerland
4	England
5	Italy
6	Sweden
7	Spain
8	Germany
9	Belgium
10	Wales
11	Denmark
12	Ireland
13	Scotland
14	Netherlands
15	Austria
16	Iceland
17	Slovenia
18	Slovakia
19	Russia
20	Turkey

== See also ==
- Espirito Santo Trophy – biennial world amateur team golf championship for women organized by the International Golf Federation.
- European Amateur Team Championship – European amateur team golf championship for men organised by the European Golf Association.
- European Ladies Amateur Championship – European amateur individual golf championship for women organised by the European Golf Association.
