= Madrid Ladies Open =

Professional golf tournament

Coordinates: 40.6208°N 3.5990°W

Comunidad de Madrid Ladies Open
Tournament information
- Location: Madrid, Spain
- Established: 2022
- Course: Jarama-RACE Golf Club
- Par: 72
- Length: 6,065 m (6,633 yd)
- Tour: Ladies European Tour
- Format: Stroke play
- Prize fund: €300,000
- Month played: May

Location in Europe

The Comunidad de Madrid Ladies Open is a professional golf tournament on the Ladies European Tour, first played in 2022.

The tournament will be the first of the 2022 LET season to be played on European soil after events in Africa, the Middle East, Asia and Australia. It marks the LET's return to Madrid after nine years of absence, the city last hosted the Open de España Femenino in 2013.

== Winners ==
Year	Winner	Country	Score	To par	Margin of victory	Runner-up	Winner's share (€)
2022	Ana Peláez	Spain	69-67-63-66=265	−23	6 strokes	(Sweden) Linnea Ström	45,000
