= Kim Métraux =

Swiss professional golfer (born 1995)

Personal information
- Nationality: Switzerland
- Born: 21 May 1995 (age 31) Lausanne, Switzerland
- Height: 5 ft 7 in (170 cm)

Career
- Sport: Golf
- College: Florida State University
- Turned professional: 2018
- Current tour: Ladies European Tour (joined 2019)
- Former tours: Symetra Tour (joined 2019); LET Access Series (joined 2018)

Best results in LPGA major championships
- Chevron Championship: DNP
- Women's PGA C'ship: DNP
- U.S. Women's Open: CUT: 2021, 2025
- Women's British Open: DNP
- Evian Championship: DNP

Kim Métraux (born 21 May 1995) is a Swiss professional golfer playing on the Ladies European Tour (LET). She was runner-up at the 2022 Joburg Ladies Open.

== Amateur career ==
Métraux started playing golf at the age of 12, together with her sister Morgane Métraux, who is also a LET member.

Métraux was member of the Swiss National Team and played her first European Girls' Team Championship in 2012. She also played in the 2013 edition, where she finished third individually, and three European Ladies' Team Championships, winning a bronze medal in 2014 and a silver medal in 2015. She has also represented Switzerland along with her sister in two World Amateur Team Championships, the 2014 Espirito Santo Trophy in Japan and the 2016 Espirito Santo Trophy Mexico, winning the silver medal in Mexico and finishing third individually, the highlight of her amateur career. Overall, she had 15 top-10s in European international amateur tournaments.

Métraux enrolled at Florida State University and played with Florida State Seminoles women's golf, where she earned All-ACC honors twice (2016 and 2017), and helped the Seminoles win seven team championships and earn the No. 1 ranking in the nation during her junior year. She graduated in April 2018 with a degree in Business Management.

== Professional career ==
Métraux turned professional in May 2018, after completing her college career. She joined the LET Access Series and played six events, finishing fourth at the Lavaux Ladies Championship in Switzerland and the Belfius Ladies Open in Belgium, and finished 30th on the 2018 Order of Merit. In 2019 she joined the Symetra Tour and played in 17 events and made 8 cuts, ending her rookie season 98th on the money list.

Métraux finished tied for 34th place at LET Q-School and only played two events in 2019, her rookie year. In 2020, she played 11 events and made nine cuts, and recorded a career-best finish of tied third at the VP Bank Swiss Ladies Open, in front of the home crowd in her native Switzerland. She was selected by Anne Van Dam to join her team at the Saudi Ladies Team International, where they finished 7th. Métraux ended the 2020 season in 21st place on the LET Order of Merit.

She qualified for the 2021 U.S. Women's Open at The Olympic Club but missed the cut.

In July 2021, she qualified for the 2020 Summer Olympics in Tokyo last minute after first her sister then Ashleigh Buhai and Marianne Skarpnord decided to give up their spots.

In March 2022, she finished runner-up at the Joburg Ladies Open, five strokes behind Linn Grant. In June, she shared the lead at the Ladies Italian Open with her sister and Sofie Bringner after the first round, but finished the tournament three strokes behind her sister, who claimed the title.

== Amateur wins ==
- 2014 Ticino Championship

== Team appearances ==
Amateur

- European Girls' Team Championship (representing Switzerland): 2012, 2013
- European Ladies' Team Championship (representing Switzerland): 2014, 2015, 2016
- Espirito Santo Trophy (representing Switzerland): 2014, 2016
