= Agathe Sauzon =

French professional golfer

Personal information
- Nationality: France
- Born: 25 January 1992 (age 34) Valence, Drôme, France

Career
- Sport: Golf
- College: University of Tennessee at Chattanooga
- Turned professional: 2016

Best results in LPGA major championships
- Chevron Championship: DNP
- Women's PGA C'ship: DNP
- U.S. Women's Open: DNP
- Women's British Open: CUT: 2019, 2021
- Evian Championship: DNP

Agathe Sauzon (born 25 January 1992) is a French professional golfer and member of the Ladies European Tour. She finished second in the team event of the 2021 Aramco Team Series – Sotogrande.

== Early life and amateur career ==
Sauzon was born in 1992 to Jean-Louis and Sylvie Sauzo, with two older siblings. She competed in tennis and dance prior to focusing on golf. As an amateur, Sauzon won the 2012 Championnat de Ligue Amateurs and the 2014 Grand Prix des Landes. She also tied for second at 2010 Swiss Ladies Amateur and 2010 Grand Prix des Landes, finished second at the 2011 Championnat de France Dames, and third at 2012 Grand Prix de Savoie.

Sauzon attended the University of Tennessee at Chattanooga and graduated May 2015 with degree in integrated studies. She played golf with the Chattanooga Mocs golf team and was the 2013 Southern Conference Champion.

== Professional career ==
Sauzon played in the 2015 Lalla Aicha Tour Q-School and finished T17. She gained Ladies European Tour membership in Category 8a for the 2016 season and turned professional. In her rookie season, Sauzon played in 11 LET tournaments and made only thee cuts. She kept her LET card by going back to Q-School, where she finished T3.

In 2017, Sauzon recorded two top-10s on the LET, a T8 at the Lalla Meryem Cup and a T6 on home soil in the Lacoste Ladies Open de France, as best French player. She also played in six LET Access Series tournaments and had five top-10s, including a T2 at the Foxconn Czech Ladies Challenge after losing a playoff to compatriot Lucie André.

Following an attempt to establish herself on the Symetra Tour in 2018, where she made two cuts in four starts, she was back on the LET in 2019. She played in 12 events and made nine cuts with a season-best finish of T7 in the Tipsport Czech Ladies Open. She also made her first start in a major at the 2019 Women's British Open.

In 2020, Sauzon played nine LET events and had a season-best of T7 at the South African Women's Open. She played in two LET Access Series events where she recorded a third place finish in the Flumserberg Ladies Open and a runner-up in the Lavaux Ladies Open, where she lost a playoff to compatriot Agathe Laisné.

In August 2021, Sauzon was on a team with Jenny Haglund and Linnea Ström that took a single-shot lead into the final day of the Aramco Team Series – Sotogrande, eventually finishing second in the event after a playoff.

== Amateur wins ==
- 2012 Championnat de Ligue Amateurs
- 2013 Southern Conference Championship, Starmount Fall Classic
- 2014 Grand Prix des Landes

== Results in LPGA majors ==
Results not in chronological order.

Tournament	2019	2020	2021
ANA Inspiration			
U.S. Women's Open			
Women's PGA Championship			
The Evian Championship		NT	
Women's British Open	CUT		CUT

Did not play

CUT = missed the half-way cut
NT = No tournament
