= Linnea Ström =

Swedish professional golfer (born 1996)

Personal information
- Nationality: Sweden
- Born: 14 October 1996 (age 30) Gothenburg, Sweden
- Height: 1.75 m (5 ft 9 in)

Career
- Sport: Golf
- College: Arizona State University
- Turned professional: 2018
- Current tours: LPGA Tour (joined 2019); Ladies European Tour (joined 2019)
- Former tour: Epson Tour (joined 2018)
- Professional wins: 3

Number of wins by tour
- LPGA Tour: 1
- Epson Tour: 2

Best results in LPGA major championships
- Chevron Championship: T26: 2019
- Women's PGA C'ship: T57: 2023
- U.S. Women's Open: T13: 2020
- Women's British Open: T22: 2024
- Evian Championship: T42: 2023

Achievements and awards
- Symetra Tour Rookie of the Year: 2018
- Epson Tour Player of the Year: 2022
Medal record
Youth Olympic Games
Gold medal – first place	2014 Nanjing	Mixed team

Linnea Ström (born 14 October 1996) is a Swedish professional golfer. She joined the U.S.-based LPGA Tour after graduating from the Symetra Tour as 2018 Rookie of the Year. She was solo second at the 2022 Madrid Ladies Open and 2023 Walmart NW Arkansas Championship before winning the 2024 ShopRite LPGA Classic.

== Amateur career ==
Ström enjoyed a highly successful amateur career. She became a member of the Swedish National Team at age 13 and was part of the Swedish team winning the European Girls' Team Championship in 2012 and again in 2013. She was a member of the 2013 Junior Solheim Cup team and the European Junior Ryder Cup teams in 2012 and 2014.

Ström, paired with Marcus Kinhult, won gold in the mixed category at the 2014 Youth Olympic Games. At the 2014 Espirito Santo Trophy in Japan, Ström's Swedish team with Louise Ridderström and Madelene Sagström finished tied fifth alongside the United States. She won the 2014 Spanish Ladies Amateur, beating Annabel Dimmock 2&1. In 2015, she was runner-up at the Spanish Ladies Amateur and at the British Ladies Amateur, where she lost the final to Céline Boutier 3&2. She qualified for the 2015 Women's British Open, her first major championship, where she did not made the cut.

Ström played college golf for the Arizona State Sun Devils at Arizona State University in Phoenix, Arizona, where she was the 2016 Pac-12 Conference Individual champion and Collegiate First Team All American 2016 and 2017. She led the Sun Devils to the program's eighth NCAA Division I National Championship in 2017.

== Professional career ==
Ranked ninth in the Women's World Amateur Golf Ranking, Ström quit ASU after 2.5 years in March 2018 to turn professional and play on the Symetra Tour, after a bout of food poisoning during the final stage of the LPGA Q-School saw her miss out on earning her LPGA card. She won her first professional tournament in September 2018, the Sioux Falls GreatLIFE Challenge, and won the 2018 Symetra Tour Rookie of the Year award. By finishing fifth on the 2018 Symetra Tour money list she earned membership of the LPGA Tour in October 2018.

On the 2019 LPGA Tour she made 11 cuts in 22 events and ended her rookie season 84th on the money list to retain her tour card. Her best finish was T5 at the Marathon Classic and she ranked 11th in average driving distance (271.52 yards), finishing sixth in the Louise Suggs Rolex Rookie of the Year standings. She earned starts at four majors and finished T26 at the 2019 ANA Inspiration.

Ström started 2020 with a T4 at the ISPS Handa Vic Open, one stroke away from the playoff won by Park Hee-young, and finished third in the Australian Ladies Classic, a Ladies European Tour event. In August she finished T9 at the Walmart NW Arkansas Championship and finished the season 41st on the LPGA money list.

In August 2021, Ström captained a team with Jenny Haglund and Agathe Sauzon that took a single-shot lead into the final day of the Aramco Team Series – Sotogrande. On the 54th-hole Stacy Lee Bregman holed a critical birdie that took her team to a playoff with Ström, and team captain Ashleigh Buhai won the title on the first extra hole.

In 2022, Ström divided her time between the Ladies European Tour and the Epson Tour. On the LET, she finished solo 3rd at the Magical Kenya Ladies Open after going into the final day with a two stroke lead. She was solo 2nd at the Madrid Ladies Open behind Ana Peláez. On the Epson Tour, she won the IOA Championship and was runner-up at the Twin Bridges Championship. She was the leading money winner to become Epson Tour Player of the Year and re-gain her fully exempt status on the LPGA Tour for the 2023 season.

In 2023, Ström was in contention at the Lotte Championship in Hawaii. Sharing the lead during the last round, a double bogey on the 14th saw her finish −11, one stroke away from a three-way playoff won by Grace Kim. She closed with a 64 to finish solo second at the Walmart NW Arkansas Championship, three strokes behind Ryu Hae-ran.

At the 2024 ShopRite LPGA Classic, Ström shot a final round 60, second only to Annika Sörenstam's 59 at the 2001 Standard Register PING, to surge from seven strokes behind, tied for last (T-52), to seize the title. Ström's probability to win at the start of the final round was 0.001%, according to KPMG Insights.

== Amateur wins ==
- 2012 Annika Invitational Europe, Swedish Junior Strokeplay Championship, Swedish Junior Matchplay Championship
- 2013 Polo Golf Junior Classic
- 2014 Spanish International Ladies Amateur Championship, Youth Olympic Games (with Marcus Kinhult)
- 2016 Pac-12 Conference Championship (individual)

== Professional wins (3) ==
=== LPGA Tour wins (1) ===
No.	Date	Tournament	Winning score	To par	Margin of victory	Runner(s)-up
1	9 Jun 2024	ShopRite LPGA Classic	69-70-60=199	−14	1 stroke	(Japan) Ayaka Furue (United States) Megan Khang

=== Epson Tour wins (2) ===
No.	Date	Tournament	Winning score	To par	Margin of victory	Runner(s)-up
1	2 Sep 2018	Sioux Falls GreatLIFE Challenge	65-71-66-67=269	−11	1 stroke	(England) Charlotte Thomas
2	27 Mar 2022	IOA Championship	71-67-67=205	−11	3 strokes	(Paraguay) Milagros Chaves (Germany) Sophie Hausmann (Australia) Sarah Jane Smith

== Playoff record ==
Ladies European Tour playoff record (0–1)

No.	Year	Tournament	Opponent(s)	Result
1	2021	Aramco Team Series – Sotogrande (Team)	(South Africa) Ashleigh Buhai	Buhai won with par on first extra hole

== Results in LPGA majors ==
Results not in chronological order.

Tournament	2015	2016	2017	2019	2017	2020	2021	2022	2023	2024	2025	2026
Chevron Championship					T26	T32	T57		T56	CUT	CUT	T59
U.S. Women's Open						T13	CUT				CUT	
Women's PGA Championship					CUT	T65	CUT		T57	CUT	CUT	CUT
The Evian Championship					CUT	NT			T42	CUT		
Women's British Open	CUT				T64	CUT			CUT	T22	CUT	

Did not play

CUT = missed the half-way cut
NT = no tournament
T = tied

=== Summary ===
Tournament	Wins	2nd	3rd	Top-5	Top-10	Top-25	Events	Cuts made
Chevron Championship	0	0	0	0	0	0	7	5
U.S. Women's Open	0	0	0	0	0	1	3	1
Women's PGA Championship	0	0	0	0	0	0	7	2
The Evian Championship	0	0	0	0	0	0	3	1
Women's British Open	0	0	0	0	0	1	6	2
Totals	0	0	0	0	0	2	26	11

== Team appearances ==
Amateur

- European Girls' Team Championship (representing Sweden): 2012 (winners), 2013 (winners)
- Junior Ryder Cup (representing Europe): 2012, 2014
- Junior Solheim Cup (representing Europe): 2013
- Espirito Santo Trophy (representing Sweden): 2014, 2016
- Vagliano Trophy (representing the Continent of Europe): 2015 (winners), 2017 (winners)
- European Ladies' Team Championship (representing Sweden): 2014, 2015, 2016, 2017
