= Nanna Koerstz Madsen =

Danish professional golfer (born 1994)

Personal information
- Nationality: Denmark
- Born: 23 October 1994 (age 32) Smørum, Denmark
- Height: 1.71 m (5 ft 7 in)

Career
- Sport: Golf
- College: University of South Carolina
- Turned professional: 2015
- Current tours: LPGA Tour; Ladies European Tour
- Former tour: Symetra Tour
- Professional wins: 6

Number of wins by tour
- LPGA Tour: 1
- Ladies European Tour: 1
- Epson Tour: 3
- Other: 1

Best results in LPGA major championships
- Chevron Championship: T3: 2021
- Women's PGA C'ship: T11: 2023
- U.S. Women's Open: T16: 2019
- Women's British Open: T5: 2021
- Evian Championship: T56: 2025

Nanna Koerstz Madsen (born 23 October 1994) is a Danish professional golfer who plays on the American LPGA Tour and maintains membership of the Ladies European Tour (LET). She won the 2022 Honda LPGA Thailand and made history becoming the first Dane to win an LPGA Tour event. She played in the 2021 Solheim Cup and represented Denmark at the 2016 Summer Olympics in Rio de Janeiro where she finished tied for 13th, and at the 2020 Summer Olympics in Tokyo where she finished tied for 9th.

== Amateur career ==
Madsen had a successful amateur career and she won both the 2012 Danish Women's Match Play Championship and the 2013 Danish Women's Stroke Play Championship. She was 2013 British Ladies Amateur Championship stroke play medalist with rounds of 69 and 72.

At the end of the season 2014, Madsen finished as the best European amateur player on the World Amateur Golf Ranking.

She played college golf with the South Carolina Gamecocks women's golf team at the University of South Carolina, winning the Mercedes-Benz Intercollegiate, before turning professional after only one semester.

== Professional career ==
Madsen earned her LET card by winning the Lalla Aicha Tour School Final Qualifying and was a Ladies European Tour rookie in 2015. On the 2015 Ladies European Tour, she finished 9th on the Order of Merit. In 2016, she won the Tipsport Golf Masters and finished 6th on the Order of Merit.

Madsen devoted the 2017 season to earning a membership on the LPGA Tour by playing the season on the Symetra Tour where she became a three-time winner resulting in her becoming the 12th player to earn a "Battlefield Promotion" to the LPGA Tour, playing in three events between late August and early September. She started as a rookie on the LPGA Tour from the beginning of the 2018 season.

In 2019, she was runner-up at the Indy Women in Tech Championship. She finished tied for 3rd at the 2021 ANA Inspiration.

Madsen captured the 2022 Honda LPGA Thailand to become the first LPGA Tour winner from Denmark. After a hard-fought battle with China's Lin Xiyu, she drained a 10-foot putt for eagle on the second playoff hole to take the title. After the win, her world ranking jumped up 22 places, from #55 to #33.

After her playoff loss to Atthaya Thitikul in the JTBC Classic on 27 March, her world ranking jumped up 13 places, to #19.

== Amateur wins ==
- 2009 Danish Junior Ladies
- 2010 Danish Junior Ladies
- 2012 DGU Elite Tour Damer II, Danish Women's Match Play Championship
- 2013 Danish Women's Stroke Play Championship, European Club Trophy
- 2014 European Nations Cup (individual), DGU Elite Tour Damer II, Danish International Championship, Mercedes-Benz Intercollegiate

== Professional wins (6) ==
=== LPGA Tour wins (1) ===
No.	Date	Tournament	Winning score	To par	Margin of victory	Runner-up
1	13 Mar 2022	Honda LPGA Thailand	65-64-66-67=262	−26	Playoff	(China) Lin Xiyu

LPGA Tour playoff record (1–1)

No.	Year	Tournament	Opponent	Result
1	2022	Honda LPGA Thailand	(China) Lin Xiyu	Won with eagle on second extra hole
2	2022	JTBC Classic	(Thailand) Atthaya Thitikul	Lost to bogey on second extra hole

=== Ladies European Tour wins (1) ===
No.	Date	Tournament	Winning score	To par	Margin of victory	Runners-up
1	19 Jun 2016	Tipsport Golf Masters	68-65-65=198	−15	5 strokes	(Scotland) Pamela Pretswell (Australia) Stacey Keating

=== Symetra Tour wins (3) ===
No.	Date	Tournament	Winning score	To par	Margin of victory	Runner(s)-up
1	30 Apr 2017	Symetra Classic	65-72-68=205	−11	2 strokes	(Ecuador) Daniela Darquea (United States) Mariah Stackhouse
2	4 Jun 2017	Fuccillo Kia Championship	68-71-66=205	−8	1 stroke	(United States) Daniela Iacobelli (United States) Kim Welch
3	23 Jul 2017	Danielle Downey Credit Union Classic	66-67-67-66=266	−22	7 strokes	(United States) Laura Wearn

=== Swedish Golf Tour wins (1) ===
No.	Date	Tournament	Winning score	To par	Margin of victory	Runners-up
1	13 Mar 2013	A6 Ladies Open (as an amateur)	73-71-66=210	−6	3 strokes	(Sweden) Eva Bjärvall (Sweden) Josephine Janson

== Results in LPGA majors ==
Results not in chronological order.

Tournament	2015	2016	2017	2018	2019	2020
Chevron Championship				CUT	T66	T51
Women's PGA Championship				CUT	CUT	T13
U.S. Women's Open			CUT		T16	CUT
The Evian Championship ^		CUT		CUT	72	NT
Women's British Open	T21	T37		CUT	CUT	CUT

Tournament	2021	2022	2023	2024	2025	2026
Chevron Championship	T3	T8	T28	T17	CUT	T34
U.S. Women's Open	CUT	CUT	70	CUT	CUT	T54
Women's PGA Championship	T15	CUT	T11	CUT	T52	T42
The Evian Championship	CUT	CUT	CUT	CUT	T56	T59
Women's British Open	T5	CUT	CUT	T10	CUT	CUT

^ The Evian Championship was added as a major in 2013.

Top 10
Did not play

CUT = missed the half-way cut
NT = no tournament
"T" = tied

=== Summary ===
Tournament	Wins	2nd	3rd	Top-5	Top-10	Top-25	Events	Cuts made
Chevron Championship	0	0	1	1	2	3	9	7
U.S. Women's Open	0	0	0	0	0	1	9	3
Women's PGA Championship	0	0	0	0	0	3	9	5
The Evian Championship	0	0	0	0	0	0	9	3
Women's British Open	0	0	0	1	2	3	11	4
Totals	0	0	1	2	4	10	47	22

- Most consecutive cuts made – 4 (2026 Chevron – 2026 Evian)
- Longest streak of top-10s – 2 (2021 Evian – 2022 Chevron)

== LPGA Tour career summary ==
Year	Tournaments played	Cuts made*	Wins	2nd	3rd	Top 10s	Best finish	Earnings ($)	Money list rank	Scoring average	Scoring rank
2015	1	1	0	0	0	0	T21	0	n/a	72.25	n/a
2016	3	2	0	0	0	0	T37	0	n/a	72.50	n/a
2017	6	3	0	1	0	1	2	0	n/a	73.18	n/a
2018	22	9	0	0	0	0	T15	91,424	106	72.18	94
2019	25	20	0	1	0	2	2	552,072	38	71.48	66
2020	12	8	0	0	0	1	T5	162,108	68	72.08	71
2021	20	16	0	0	1	2	T3	635,948	31	70.77	38
2022	23	12	1	1	0	3	1	632,106	49	70.89	42
2023	25	16	0	0	0	1	T4	445,722	64	71.62	79
2024	26	19	0	0	0	5	T3	844,805	47	70.84	21
2025	23	18	0	0	0	4	T4	685,038	57	70.14	12
Totals^	186	124	1	3	1	19	1	4,049,223	127		

^ Official as of 2025 season
*Includes matchplay and other tournaments without a cut.

== World ranking ==
Position in Women's World Golf Rankings at the end of each calendar year.

Year	World ranking	Source
2015	159	
2016	103	
2017	134	
2018	246	
2019	67	
2020	76	
2021	50	
2022	53	
2023	117	
2024	86	
2025	61	

== Team appearances ==
Amateur

- European Girls' Team Championship (representing the Denmark): 2012
- Espirito Santo Trophy (representing Denmark): 2012, 2014
- European Ladies' Team Championship (representing Denmark): 2013, 2014

Professional

- The Queens (representing Europe): 2015, 2016
- Solheim Cup (representing Europe): 2021 (winners), 2026 (winners)

=== Solheim Cup record ===
Year	Total matches	Total W–L–H	Singles W–L–H	Foursomes W–L–H	Fourballs W–L–H	Points won	Points %
Career	6	2–3–1	1–0–1	0–1–0	1–2–0	2.5	33.3
2021	3	1–1–1	0–0–1 halved w/ A. Ernst	0–0–0	1–1–0 lost w/ M. Sagström 1 dn won w/ C. Ciganda 1 up	1.5	50.0
2026	3	1–2–0	1–0–0 def. A. Corpuz 2&1	0–1–0 lost w/ C. Boutier 3&2	0–1–0 lost w/ C. Boutier 5&3	1	33.3
