= Matilda Castren =

Finnish professional golfer (born 1995)

Personal information
- Full name: Matilda Maria Castren
- Nationality: Finland
- Born: 18 January 1995 (age 31) New York, New York, U.S.
- Height: 5 ft 7 in (170 cm)

Career
- Sport: Golf
- College: Florida State University
- Turned professional: 2017
- Current tour: Symetra Tour
- Former tours: LPGA Tour (joined 2020); LET (joined 2021)
- Professional wins: 3

Number of wins by tour
- LPGA Tour: 1
- Ladies European Tour: 1
- Epson Tour: 1

Best results in LPGA major championships
- Chevron Championship: T25: 2022
- Women's PGA C'ship: T23: 2020
- U.S. Women's Open: T30: 2021
- Women's British Open: T20: 2021
- Evian Championship: T19: 2021

Matilda Maria Castren (born 18 January 1995) is a Finnish professional golfer who has played on the LPGA Tour. In 2021 she won the LPGA Mediheal Championship to become the first player from Finland to win on the LPGA Tour.

== Career ==
Castrén won the 2011 Doral Publix Junior Classic in the U.S. and the 2013 Skandia Junior Open in Sweden, and was runner-up at the 2013 Portuguese Ladies Amateur. She represented Finland at the 2011, 2012 and 2013 European Girls' Team Championship, the 2014, 2015 and 2016 European Ladies' Team Championship, and at the 2014 and 2016 Espirito Santo Trophy. She was also on the winning Vagliano Trophy team in 2017.

Castrén played college golf at Florida State University beginning in 2014 and graduated in May 2017 with a degree in international affairs, after winning seven individual titles in collegiate competition during her time with the Florida State Seminoles women's golf team, a school record. She was named second-Team All-American by the Women's Golf Coaches Association and Golfweek in 2014 and was a three-time All-ACC selection (2014, 2016 and 2017) as one of only three players in school history. She set school record for lowest career stroke average (72.52) over her four-year varsity career.

Castrén played two seasons on the Symetra Tour in 2018 and 2019, before she finished T26 at the LPGA Final Qualifying Tournament to earn her card for the 2020 LPGA Tour. In only six starts she earned enough to qualify via the money list for her first major, the 2020 Women's PGA Championship, where she was T9 after a first round of 69 and finished the tournament T23.

In her rookie season on the LPGA Tour, she won the 2021 LPGA Mediheal Championship in just her 15th career LPGA Tour start.

In July, Castrén claimed her first Ladies European Tour (LET) title after she shot a final round of 68 to win the 2021 Gant Ladies Open in her native Finland. She needed to secure a victory on the LET to become a member of the tour and be eligible for the 2021 European Solheim Cup Team.

== Amateur wins ==
- 2011 (1) Doral Publix Junior Classic 16–18
- 2013 (1) Skandia Junior Open Girls
- 2014 (2) Florida State Match-Up, Web.com/Marsh Landing Intercollegiate
- 2015 (1) Jacksonville Classic
- 2016 (3) Florida Challenge, NCAA Shoal Creek Regional Championships, Jim West Challenge
- 2017 (1) Clemson Invitational

== Professional wins (3) ==
=== LPGA Tour wins (1) ===
No.	Date	Tournament	Winning score	To par	Margin of victory	Runner-up
1	13 Jun 2021	LPGA Mediheal Championship	71-69-69-65=274	−14	2 strokes	(Chinese Taipei) Min Lee

=== Ladies European Tour wins (1) ===
No.	Date	Tournament	Winning score	To par	Margin of victory	Runners-up
1	17 Jul 2021	Gant Ladies Open	71-69-68=208	−5	3 strokes	(India) Tvesa Malik (Finland) Ursula Wikström

=== Symetra Tour wins (1) ===
No.	Date	Tournament	Winning score	To par	Margin of victory	Runner-up
1	17 Oct 2020	Mission Inn Resort and Club Championship	68-68-71=207	−12	5 strokes	(Sweden) Linnea Johansson

== Results in LPGA majors ==
Results not in chronological order.

Tournament	2020	2021	2022	2023	2024
Chevron Championship			T25	T28	CUT
U.S. Women's Open		T30	T44		
Women's PGA Championship	T23	CUT	T40	T77	
The Evian Championship	NT	T19	T40	CUT	
Women's British Open		T20	WD	CUT	

Did not play

CUT = missed the half-way cut
WD = withdrew
NT = no tournament
T = tied

== Team appearances ==
Amateur

- European Girls' Team Championship (representing Finland): 2011, 2012, 2013
- European Ladies' Team Championship (representing Finland): 2014, 2015, 2016
- Espirito Santo Trophy (representing Finland): 2014, 2016
- Vagliano Trophy (representing the Continent of Europe): 2017 (winners)

Professional

- Solheim Cup (representing Europe): 2021 (winners)

=== Solheim Cup record ===
Year	Total matches	Total W–L–H	Singles W–L–H	Foursomes W–L–H	Fourballs W–L–H	Points won	Points %
Career	4	3–1–0	1–0–0	1–1–0	1–0–0	3	75.0
2021	4	3–1–0	1–0–0 def. L. Salas 1 up	1–1–0 won w/ A. Nordqvist 1 up lost w/ A. Nordqvist 3&1	1–0–0 won w/ A. Nordqvist 4&3	3	75.0
