= Daniela Darquea =

Ecuadorian professional golfer

Personal information
- Nickname: Dani
- Nationality: Ecuador
- Born: 26 July 1995 (age 31) Quito, Ecuador

Career
- Sport: Golf
- College: University of Miami
- Turned professional: 2016
- Current tours: Ladies European Tour (joined 2025); Epson Tour
- Former tour: LPGA Tour
- Professional wins: 1

Number of wins by tour
- Epson Tour: 1

Best results in LPGA major championships
- Chevron Championship: CUT: 2023
- Women's PGA C'ship: T30: 2019
- U.S. Women's Open: 61st: 2018
- Women's British Open: CUT: 2018, 2019, 2023, 2026
- Evian Championship: T48: 2023
Medal record
Bolivarian Games
Silver medal – second place	2017 Santa Marta	Individual
Silver medal – second place	2017 Santa Marta	Mixed team

Daniela Darquea (born 26 July 1995) is a professional golfer from Ecuador, who has played on the LPGA Tour and Ladies European Tour.

== Amateur career ==
Darquea attended the University of Miami and played golf with the Miami Hurricanes where she was WGCA All-American, All-American Scholar, All-ACC, All-ACC Academic in 2014. She won the Briar's Creek Invitational, Hurricane Invitational and Suntrust Gator Women's Invitational.

She represented Ecuador at the 2015 Pan American Games and 2016 Espirito Santo Trophy, and qualified for the 2015 U.S. Women's Open at Lancaster Country Club.

== Professional career ==
Darquea finished T29 at the 2016 LPGA Final Qualifying Tournament to earn partial status for the 2017 season. She decided to forego the remainder of her senior season and turn pro. She made one LPGA start in her rookie season and played mainly on the Symetra Tour, where she made the cut in 16 out of 22 starts and recorded six top-10 finishes, including a victory at the IOA Championship and a runner-up finish at the Symetra Classic.

In 2018, she played in 19 LPGA Tour events. She made 10 cuts and finished 95th on the money list, recording a season-best of T5 at the Marathon Classic. The following year she was 97th on the money list with a season-best T6 finish at the Walmart NW Arkansas Championship.

Darquea qualified for the 2020 Summer Olympics in Tokyo.

Darquea earned her card for the 2025 Ladies European Tour at Q-School where she was the medalist.

== Amateur wins ==
- 2012 Abierto De Arrayanes, Copa Ron Abuelo, Abierto Damas de Lacosta Country Club, Abierto De Los Chillos Club Campestre
- 2013 Classificacion Sudamericano Juvenil, Abierto de Arrayanes, AJGA Kansas Junior at Buffalo Dunes
- 2014 Hurricane Invitational, Suntrust Gator Women's Invitational
- 2015 Briar's Creek Invitational, Abierto del Quito Tenis y GC

== Professional wins (1) ==
=== Symetra Tour wins (1) ===
No.	Date	Tournament	Winning score	Margin of victory	Runners-up
1	26 Mar 2017	IOA Championship	−12 (70-67-67=204)	3 strokes	(Thailand) Niphatsophon Benyapa (Canada) Anne-Catherine Tanguay

== Results in LPGA majors ==
Results not in chronological order.

Tournament	2015	2016	2017	2018	2019	2020	2021	2022	2023	2024	2025	2026
Chevron Championship									CUT			
U.S. Women's Open	CUT			61			CUT	CUT	CUT		CUT	
Women's PGA Championship				CUT	T30				T36			
The Evian Championship				T67	CUT	NT			T48			
Women's British Open				CUT	CUT				CUT			CUT

Did not play

CUT = missed the half-way cut
NT = no tournament
T = tied

=== Summary ===
Tournament	Wins	2nd	3rd	Top-5	Top-10	Top-25	Events	Cuts made
Chevron Championship	0	0	0	0	0	0	1	0
U.S. Women's Open	0	0	0	0	0	0	6	1
Women's PGA Championship	0	0	0	0	0	0	3	2
The Evian Championship	0	0	0	0	0	0	3	2
Women's British Open	0	0	0	0	0	0	4	0
Totals	0	0	0	0	0	0	17	5

- Most consecutive cuts made – 2 (2023 Women's PGA – 2023 Evian)

== World ranking ==
Position in Women's World Golf Rankings at the end of each calendar year.

Year	Ranking	Source
2017	421	
2018	282	
2019	187	
2020	264	
2021	391	
2022	195	
2023	228	
2024	481	
2025	261	

== Team appearances ==
Amateur

- Espirito Santo Trophy (representing Ecuador): 2016

Professional

- Pan American Games (representing Ecuador): 2015
- Bolivarian Games (representing Ecuador): 2017
