= Bronte Law =

English professional golfer (born 1995)

Personal information
- Full name: Bronte May Law
- Nationality: England
- Born: 12 March 1995 (age 31) Stockport, England
- Height: 5 ft 5 in (1.65 m)

Career
- Sport: Golf
- College: UCLA
- Turned professional: 2016
- Current tours: Ladies European Tour; LPGA Tour
- Former tour: Symetra Tour
- Professional wins: 4

Number of wins by tour
- LPGA Tour: 1
- Ladies European Tour: 3

Best results in LPGA major championships
- Chevron Championship: T25: 2018
- Women's PGA C'ship: T18: 2018
- U.S. Women's Open: T6: 2022
- Women's British Open: T33: 2012
- Evian Championship: T22: 2019

Bronte May Law (born 12 March 1995) is an English professional golfer. Her maiden LPGA Tour victory, her first win as a professional, came in May 2019 at the Pure Silk Championship in Virginia. Her second professional victory occurred in October 2021 in Dubai; this was her first win on the Ladies European Tour.

== Early life and amateur career ==
Law was born in Stockport and attended Cheadle Hulme School and the University of California, Los Angeles (UCLA).

Law played for Great Britain & Ireland in the 2012, 2014 and 2016 Curtis Cup matches. In 2016, she became the second player, and the first from Great Britain and Ireland, to get a perfect 5–0 record. Also in 2016 she won the European Ladies Amateur Championship, becoming the world number 2 ranked player in the World Amateur Golf Ranking.

== Professional career ==
Law turned professional late in 2016. She competed in the LPGA Final Qualifying Tournament, earning full status on the Symetra Tour and partial status on the LPGA Tour for 2017. In December 2018, Law won through the Lalla Aicha Tour School with an all-time record score of twenty six-under-par to gain membership of the Ladies European Tour. Law shot nine consecutive birdies during her third round, a record on the Ladies European Tour.

In early May 2019, Law lost to Kim Sei-young in a playoff for the LPGA Mediheal Championship. Three weeks later she won the Pure Silk Championship for her first victory on the LPGA Tour. Law made her first Solheim Cup appearance in 2019 at Gleneagles Hotel, Scotland. Law finished the tournament with a 1‍–‍1‍–‍2 (win‍–‍loss‍–‍tie) record as Europe sealed a 14.5–13.5 victory over the United States. Law defeated Ally McDonald 2 and 1 in the singles. Speaking about the Cup, Law said "I've never experienced anything like this in my life and I don't know whether I ever will again."

Law won her first Ladies European Tour title at the 2021 Dubai Moonlight Classic, finishing one-stroke clear of Maria Fassi at Emirates Golf Club. She won her second LET title the following year, when she made an eagle on the final hole to beat Georgia Hall to the title of the Aramco Team Series-London at the Centurion Club.

In February 2024, Law won the Lalla Meryem Cup, securing a three-stroke victory. She finished third at the Aramco Team Series-Tampa in March, four-strokes behind champion Alexandra Försterling.

== Personal life ==
Law is the daughter of Morven and Timothy Law. She has a younger sister named Isabella. Law studied sociology at UCLA, where she met one of her best friends, teammate Alison Lee. The two have each led solid careers early on the LPGA Tour. She grew up an avid competitor in all sports, and is a big football fan, holding allegiances to Manchester United.

== Amateur wins ==
- 2013 Nanea Pac-12 Preview
- 2014 Stanford Intercollegiate, English Women's Amateur Championship
- 2015 Northrop Grumman Regional Challenge, English Women's Amateur Championship, Stanford Intercollegiate
- 2016 PING ASU Invitational, NCAA Bryan Regional, European Ladies Amateur Championship, Stanford Intercollegiate

== Professional wins (4) ==
=== LPGA Tour wins (1) ===
No.	Date	Tournament	Winning score	To par	Margin of victory	Runners-up
1	26 May 2019	Pure Silk Championship	65-68-67-67=267	−17	2 strokes	(Japan) Nasa Hataoka (Canada) Brooke Henderson (Sweden) Madelene Sagström

LPGA Tour playoff record (0–1)

No.	Year	Tournament	Opponents	Result
1	2019	LPGA Mediheal Championship	(South Korea) Kim Sei-young (South Korea) Lee Jeong-eun	Kim won with birdie on first extra hole

=== Ladies European Tour wins (3) ===
No.	Date	Tournament	Winning score	To par	Margin of victory	Runner-up
1	29 Oct 2021	Dubai Moonlight Classic	68-69-64=201	−15	1 stroke	(Mexico) María Fassi
2	18 Jun 2022	Aramco Team Series – London	68-71-71=210	−9	1 stroke	(England) Georgia Hall
3	24 Feb 2024	Lalla Meryem Cup	73-69-64=206	−13	3 strokes	(France) Pauline Roussin

== Results in LPGA majors ==
Results not in chronological order.

Tournament	2012	2013	2014	2015	2016	2017	2018	2019	2020	2021	2022	2023	2024	2025	2026
Chevron Championship					CUT		T25	CUT	CUT	T50	T71				
U.S. Women's Open						CUT		CUT	T30		T6	T45			CUT
Women's PGA Championship						T64	T18	CUT	CUT	CUT	CUT	CUT			
The Evian Championship ^					CUT	T32	T59	T22	NT	T54	CUT		CUT	73	
Women's British Open	T33				T50		T39	T35	T51	CUT	T48		CUT	T50	

^ The Evian Championship was added as a major in 2013

Top 10
Did not play

CUT = missed the half-way cut
NT = no tournament
T = tied

=== Summary ===
Tournament	Wins	2nd	3rd	Top-5	Top-10	Top-25	Events	Cuts made
Chevron Championship	0	0	0	0	0	1	6	3
Women's PGA Championship	0	0	0	0	0	1	7	2
U.S. Women's Open	0	0	0	0	1	1	6	3
The Evian Championship	0	0	0	0	0	1	8	5
Women's British Open	0	0	0	0	0	0	9	7
Totals	0	0	0	0	1	4	36	20

- Most consecutive cuts made – 5 (2017 Evian – 2018 Evian)
- Longest streak of top-10s – 1

== Team appearances ==
Amateur

- European Girls' Team Championship (representing the England): 2011, 2012
- Junior Vagliano Trophy: (representing Great Britain & Ireland): 2011
- Curtis Cup (representing Great Britain & Ireland): 2012 (winners), 2014, 2016 (winners)
- Junior Ryder Cup (representing Europe): 2012
- European Ladies' Team Championship (representing England): 2013, 2014, 2015, 2016 (winners)
- Vagliano Trophy (representing Great Britain and Ireland): 2013, 2015
- Junior Solheim Cup (representing Europe): 2013
- Espirito Santo Trophy (representing England): 2014
- Astor Trophy (representing Great Britain and Ireland): 2015

Professional

- International Crown (representing England): 2018, 2023
- Solheim Cup (representing Europe): 2019 (winners)

=== Solheim Cup record ===
Year	Total matches	Total W–L–H	Singles W–L–H	Foursomes W–L–H	Fourballs W–L–H	Points won	Points %
Career	4	1–1–2	1–0–0	0–1–1	0–0–1	2	50.0
2019	4	1–1–2	1–0–0 def. A. McDonald 2&1	0–1–1 halved w/ C. Ciganda lost w/ C. Ciganda 6&5	0–0–1 halved w/ C. Ciganda	2	50.0
