= Madelene Sagström =

Swedish professional golfer (born 1992)

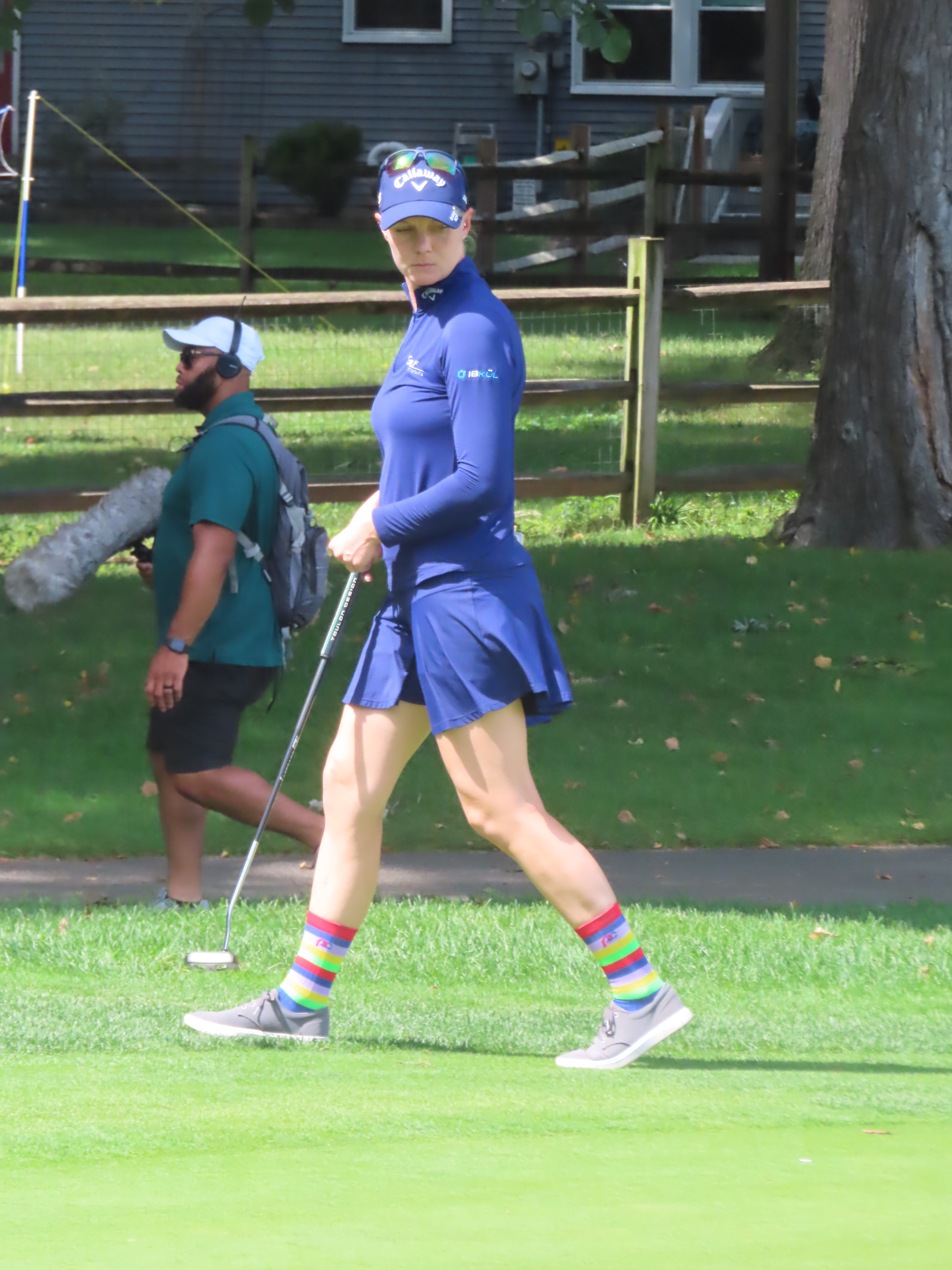
- Sagström at the 2022 Dana Open

Personal information
- Full name: Madelene Maria Sagström
- Nationality: Sweden
- Born: 13 November 1992 (age 33) Uppsala, Sweden
- Height: 5 ft 9 in (1.75 m)
- Spouse: Jack Clarke

Career
- Sport: Golf
- College: Louisiana State University
- Turned professional: 2015
- Current tours: LPGA Tour (joined 2016); Ladies European Tour (joined 2017)
- Former tour: Symetra Tour
- Professional wins: 5

Number of wins by tour
- LPGA Tour: 2
- Epson Tour: 3

Best results in LPGA major championships
- Chevron Championship: T13: 2022
- Women's PGA C'ship: T11: 2017
- U.S. Women's Open: T17: 2018
- Women's British Open: T2: 2021
- Evian Championship: T12: 2024

Achievements and awards
- Symetra Tour Player of the Year: 2016
- Symetra Tour Rookie of the Year: 2016
- Swedish Golfer of the Year: 2020

Madelene Maria Sagström (born 13 November 1992) is a Swedish professional golfer who plays on the U.S.-based LPGA Tour. She won the 2020 Gainbridge LPGA at Boca Rio and was runner-up at the 2021 Women's British Open.

== Early life ==
At 9, Sagström began learning golf with her parents at Enköping Golf Club, 74 kilometres northwest of Stockholm, Sweden, and she has continued to represent the club.

== Amateur career ==
At the age of 16, she won the 2009 Swedish Junior Stroke-play Championship (for players up to 21) over 72 holes at Österåker Golf Club outside Stockholm, by seven strokes, scoring five under par on the last 36 holes.

In 2011, Sagström won the French International Lady Junior Championship, at Golf de Saint Cloud outside Paris, and was a member of the winning Swedish team at the European Ladies' Team Championship at Golf Club Murhof in Austria.

Sagström played college golf with the LSU Lady Tigers team at Louisiana State University in Baton Rouge, Louisiana. She was 2015 SEC Player of the Year at LSU and a finalist for the ANNIKA Award.

== Professional career ==
Sagström turned professional after graduating in 2015. She made her professional debut at the Helsingborg Open on the Ladies European Tour in Sweden in September, and earned her first pay-check.

In 2016, Swedish former European Tour Order of Merit-winner Robert Karlsson became her mentor.

=== Symetra Tour Player of the Year ===
In 2016, she joined the Symetra Tour in United States, where she finished inside the top-5 in her first five starts. After victories at both the Chico Patty Berg Memorial in Fort Myers, Florida, and the Self Regional Healthcare Foundation Women's Health Classic in Greenwood, South Carolina, Sagström led the tour's money list race by a wide margin, earning a spot in the LPGA 2017 rookie class.

With her third win at the Murphy USA El Dorado Shootout in El Dorado, Arkansas, Sagström both secured the top spot on the final Volvik Race for the Card money list and earned a "Battlefield Promotion" to the 2016 LPGA Tour. She had a record breaking Symetra Tour season, becoming the first player in Tour history to crack $100,000 and $150,000, winning Player of the Year and Rookie of the Year honors. In 14 Symetra Tour starts, Sagström had three wins and 11 top-10 finishes.

In December 2016, Sagström won the Ladies European Tour's Q-School in Morocco, securing membership of the Ladies European Tour for 2017, a requirement to make her eligible for selection in the 2017 Solheim Cup. She was selected as a captain's pick by Annika Sörenstam to the 2017 European Solheim Cup team and finished the 2017 LPGA Tour season 49th on the Order of Merit.

=== First LPGA Tour win ===
Sagström finished tied second at the Pure Silk Championship on the LPGA Tour in May 2019, two strokes behind Bronte Law.

In her first tournament of the 2020 season, Sagström notched her first win on the LPGA Tour at the Gainbridge LPGA at Boca Rio in Boca Raton, Florida. She won with a stroke ahead of Nasa Hataoka, who made bogey on the final hole. Sagström set the course record at Boca Rio Golf Club firing a 62 (−10) in the second round of the tournament. Taking the 117th LPGA Tour win by a Swedish born player, Sagström became the 12th Swedish winner on the tour.

Sagström represented Sweden at the 2021 Summer Olympics in Tokyo, where she shot a 5-under-par 66 to take the first round lead, a stroke ahead of Aditi Ashok and world number one Nelly Korda, before ultimately tying for 20th.

=== Contending at majors ===
Two weeks after the Olympic golf tournament, Sagström tied the first round lead at the 2021 Women's British Open and eventually finished tied second, one shot behind winner Anna Nordqvist, after scoring a bogey on the final hole. After the tournament, she was announced as one of the captain's pick for the 2021 European Solheim Cup team.

In 2022, Sagström recorded four consecutive top-10 finishes, including a tie for 3rd at the DIO Implant LA Open and the Cognizant Founders Cup. After she was runner-up behind Lexi Thompson at the Aramco Team Series – New York, an LET event, she rose into the top-25 in the Women's World Golf Rankings for the first time..

At the 2022 Women's British Open at Muirfield she shot a day-low 65 in round two to share second place with eventual winner Ashleigh Buhai. Sagström finished the tournament in shared fourth place, 3 strokes behind Buhai, after a final-hole bogey.

In 2024, Sagström led by one shot over Rose Zhang with 18 holes to play at the Cognizant Founders Cup. The tournament turned into a two-player duel, which Zhang ultimately won by two strokes after birdieing 4 of the last 5 holes. The next closest player, Gabriela Ruffels, was 13 shots behind Sagström. With the finish, Sagström surpassed the $4 million mark in career earnings and climbed to 109th on the LPGA all-time money list.

=== Second LPGA Tour win ===
Sagström won the 2025 T-Mobile Match Play, after beating Lauren Coughlin 1 up in the final.

She turned heads when she played in the 2026 U.S. Women's Open while seven months pregnant. After appearing in 35 straight majors, she had to sit out the next one, the 2026 Women's PGA Championship.

== Awards, honors ==
In 2016, she received Elit Sign number 143 by the Swedish Golf Federation based on world ranking achievements.

For the 2016 Symetra Tour season, she was awarded Player of the Year as well as Rookie of the Year.

She was named as the Swedish Golfer of the Year, male or female, professional or amateur, for the 2020 season.

In 2018, she was awarded honorary member of the PGA of Sweden.

== Amateur wins ==
- 2009 Swedish Junior Strokeplay Championship
- 2011 French International Lady Junior Championship

== Professional wins (5) ==
=== LPGA Tour (2) ===
No.	Date	Tournament	Winning score	To par	Margin of victory	Runner-up
1	26 Jan 2020	Gainbridge LPGA at Boca Rio	72-62-67-70=271	−17	1 stroke	(Japan) Nasa Hataoka
2	6 Apr 2025	T-Mobile Match Play	1 up			(United States) Lauren Coughlin

=== Symetra Tour (3) ===
No.	Date	Tournament	Winning score	To par	Margin of victory	Runner-up	Ref
1	17 Apr 2016	Chico's Patty Berg Memorial	69-66-69-75=269	−9	1 stroke	(Germany) Sophia Popov	
2	8 May 2016	Self Regional Healthcare Foundation Classic	66-67-71-74=278	−6	6 strokes	(Thailand) Wichanee Meechai	
3	2 Oct 2016	Murphy USA El Dorado Shootout	69-68-72=209	−7	2 strokes	(United States) Becca Huffer	

== Results in LPGA majors ==
Results not in chronological order.

Tournament	2016	2017	2018	2019	2020	2021	2022	2023	2024	2025	2026
Chevron Championship			71	T52	T57	CUT	T13	CUT	T30	CUT	CUT
U.S. Women's Open	T46	T54	T17		T30	T20	CUT	CUT	T69	T19	CUT
Women's PGA Championship		T11	CUT	T48	T23	T15	T25	T39	T22	CUT	
The Evian Championship		CUT	CUT	CUT	NT	T38	T27	CUT	T12	T49	
Women's British Open		T63	T20	CUT	CUT	T2	T4	CUT	CUT	T40	

Top 10
Did not play

CUT = missed the half-way cut
NT = no tournament
T = tied

=== Summary ===
Tournament	Wins	2nd	3rd	Top-5	Top-10	Top-25	Events	Cuts made
Chevron Championship	0	0	0	0	0	1	9	5
U.S. Women's Open	0	0	0	0	0	3	10	7
Women's PGA Championship	0	0	0	0	0	5	9	7
The Evian Championship	0	0	0	0	0	1	8	4
Women's British Open	0	1	0	2	2	3	9	5
Totals	0	1	0	2	2	13	45	28

== World ranking ==
Position in Women's World Golf Rankings at the end of each calendar year.

Year	World ranking	Source
2016	222	
2017	74	
2018	118	
2019	118	
2020	61	
2021	44	
2022	27	
2023	62	
2024	58	
2025	51	

== Team appearances ==
Amateur

- European Girls' Team Championship (representing Sweden): 2010
- European Ladies' Team Championship (representing Sweden): 2011 (winners), 2013, 2014, 2015
- Vagliano Trophy (representing the Continent of Europe): 2011 (winners), 2015 (winners)
- Espirito Santo Trophy (representing Sweden): 2012, 2014

Professional

- Solheim Cup (representing Europe): 2017, 2021 (winners), 2023 (tie, cup retained), 2024
- International Crown (representing Sweden): 2018, 2023, 2025

=== Solheim Cup record ===
Year	Total matches	Total W–L–H	Singles W–L–H	Foursomes W–L–H	Fourballs W–L–H	Points won	Points %
Career	12	5–6–1	3–1–0	0–1–0	2–4–1	5.5	45.8
2017	3	1–2–0	1–0–0 def. A. Ernst 3&2	0–0–0	0–2–0 lost w/ J. Shadoff 3&1 lost w/ K. Icher 2&1	1	33.3
2021	3	1–2–0	1–0–0 def. A. Ewing 3&2	0–1–0 lost w/ G. Hall 1 dn	0–1–0 lost w/ N. Madsen 1 dn	1	33.3
2023	3	1–1–1	0–1–0 lost to L. Vu 4&3	0–0–0	1–0–1 halved w/ G. Dryburgh won w/ E. Pedersen 2&1	1.5	50.0
2024	3	2–1–0	1–0–0 def. S. Schmelzel 1 up	0–0–0	1–1–0 won w/ A. Nordqvist 6&5 lost w/ A. Nordqvist 4&3	2	66.7
