= Albane Valenzuela =

Swiss professional golfer (born 1997)

Personal information
- Nationality: Switzerland
- Born: 17 December 1997 (age 28) New York City, New York, U.S.
- Height: 5 ft 9 in (175 cm)

Career
- Sport: Golf
- College: Stanford University
- Turned professional: 2019
- Current tour: LPGA Tour

Best results in LPGA major championships
- Chevron Championship: T4: 2023
- Women's PGA C'ship: T46: 2021
- U.S. Women's Open: 24th: 2018
- Women's British Open: T20: 2024
- Evian Championship: T22: 2024

Albane Ines Marie Valenzuela (born 17 December 1997) is a Swiss professional golfer and a three-time Olympian. She was born in New York City to a Mexican father and French mother. She became a Swiss citizen at age 14.

== Amateur career ==
Valenzuela took low amateur honors at the 2016 ANA Inspiration. She also made the cut at the 2016 U.S. Women's Open. She had two top-5 finishes on the Ladies European Tour in 2016 and a top-10 finish in the 2014 Lacoste Ladies French Open with a tournament low round of 64.

Valenzuela qualified for the 2016 Summer Olympics. She was the number one ranked golfer in Switzerland and reached number two in the World Amateur Golf Rankings. Valenzuela also won the European Golf Association European Order of Merit in 2018.

Valenzuela reached the final of the 2017 U.S. Women's Amateur, losing to Sophia Schubert, 6 and 5. In 2019, she again reached the finals, losing to Gabriela Ruffels, 1 up. Valenzuela was also runner-up in the European Ladies Amateur Championship in 2017.

Valenzuela played college golf at Stanford University before turning professional in late 2019. Valenzuela was named Pac-12 Player of the Year in 2019 and was a Ping/WGCA First Team All-American. She was a recipient of the WGCA's Edith Cummings Munson Award which is given to one of the top collegiate female golfers who excels in academics. She was also named to the Google Cloud CoSIDA first team Academic All-American. She graduated in 2020 with a degree in political science and was awarded Phi Beta Kappa.

== Professional career ==
Valenzuela turned professional after earning her LPGA Tour card by finishing T-6 at Q Series in November 2019. She represented Switzerland at the 2016 Rio Olympics, 2020 Tokyo Olympics and 2024 Paris Olympics.

== Amateur wins ==
- 2013 Swiss National Match Play Championship (with Rachel Rossel), Bulgarian Amateur Open
- 2014 Swiss International Championship
- 2015 Spanish International Stroke Play, Doral Publix Junior Classic, Junior Orange Bowl International Golf Championship
- 2017 NCAA Albuquerque Regional
- 2018 East Lake Cup
- 2019 Pac-12 Championship

== Results in LPGA majors ==
Results not in chronological order.

Tournament	2015	2016	2017	2018	2019	2020	2021	2022	2023	2024	2025	2026
Chevron Championship		T65		59	T66		CUT	T53	T4	CUT	T44	72
U.S. Women's Open		T67		24	CUT				T59	T29	CUT	
Women's PGA Championship						CUT	T46	CUT	T61	CUT	CUT	
The Evian Championship	CUT	CUT	CUT	CUT	T37	NT	CUT	T27	T42	T22	CUT	
Women's British Open							T29	T54	CUT	T20	CUT	

Top 10
Did not play

CUT = missed the half-way cut
NT = no tournament
T = tied

=== Summary ===
Tournament	Wins	2nd	3rd	Top-5	Top-10	Top-25	Events	Cuts made
Chevron Championship	0	0	0	1	1	1	9	7
U.S. Women's Open	0	0	0	0	0	1	6	4
Women's PGA Championship	0	0	0	0	0	0	6	2
The Evian Championship	0	0	0	0	0	1	10	4
Women's British Open	0	0	0	0	0	1	5	3
Totals	0	0	0	1	1	4	36	20

- Most consecutive cuts made – 6 (2022 Evian – 2023 Evian)
- Longest streak of top-10s – 1 (once)

== Team appearances ==
Amateur

- Junior Vagliano Trophy (representing the Continent of Europe): 2013 (winners)
- Espirito Santo Trophy (representing Switzerland): 2014, 2018
- Junior Solheim Cup (representing Europe): 2015
- Vagliano Trophy (representing the Continent of Europe): 2015 (winners), 2017 (winners), 2019 (winners)
- Patsy Hankins Trophy (representing Europe): 2016
- Arnold Palmer Cup (representing the International team): 2018
- European Ladies' Team Championship (representing Switzerland): 2014, 2015, 2017
- European Girls' Team Championship (representing Switzerland): 2012, 2013

Professional

- Solheim Cup (representing Europe): 2024

=== Solheim Cup record ===
Year	Total matches	Total W–L–H	Singles W–L–H	Foursomes W–L–H	Fourballs W–L–H	Points won	Points %
Career	2	0–1–1	0–0–1	0–1–0	0–0–0	0.5	25.0
2024	2	0–1–1	0–0–1 tied w/ L. Vu	0–1–0 lost w/ C. Boutier 3&2	0–0–0	0.5	25.0
