= Golf in Sweden =

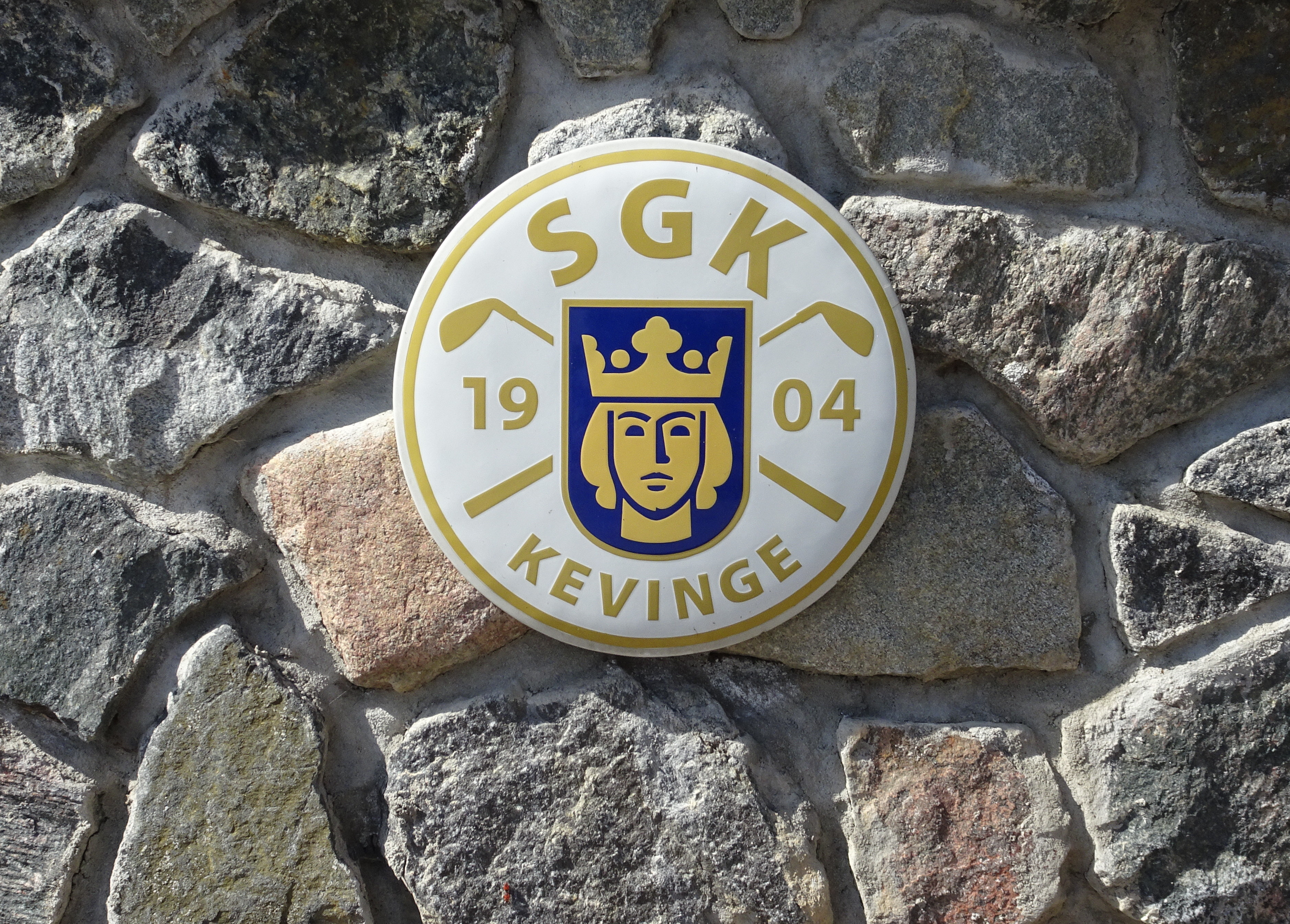

Golf in Sweden dates to 1888 when the first course was opened at Ryfors Bruk in Mullsjö. The first 18 hole course was opened in Gothenburg in 1894, and Stockholm Golf Club was established along with the Swedish Golf Federation (SGF) in 1904. Today it is a popular sport with over half a million active players and close to 500 courses.

== History ==
In 1946, Prince Bertil, Duke of Halland became Chairman of the SGF. Sven Tumba was instrumental in promoting the game as a healthy activity for the masses, and in 1968 he organized exhibition matches at Lidingö Golf Club and Falsterbo Golf Club featuring Arnold Palmer, popularizing the sport further. By 1970 there were 110 courses.

The first notable Swedish professional golfers emerged in the 1970s, with Gunnar Mueller the first to play all four rounds in a major at the 1973 Open Championship. Kärstin Ehrnlund joined the Ladies European Tour in its inaugural season in 1979, and secured the first Swedish victory on the tour in 1980. In 1982, Charlotte Montgomery became the first to qualify as a member on one of the main U.S.-based golf tours when she succeeded at the LPGA Final Qualifying Tournament, soon followed by Pia Nilsson, who would later captain the European 1998 Solheim Cup team.

Golf boomed in the 1980s, and the number of courses almost doubled in a single decade to 271. In 1984, the Swedish Golf Tour was established, and a women's tour followed two years later. Corporate sponsorship of professionals emerged, and Team Saab supported by Saab Automobile, saw Ove Sellberg, Magnus Persson and Krister Kinell turn professionals in 1982 and be competitive on the European Tour, where the first victory came in 1986. Liselotte Neumann became the first LPGA Tour winner and major champion when she won the 1988 U.S. Women's Open.

In 1997, Gabriel Hjertstedt became the first to win on the PGA Tour and two years later the first two-time winner. Jesper Parnevik became the first three-time winner, with a total of five PGA Tour-titles 1997–2001. Between 1995 and 2005 Annika Sörenstam was a dominant on the LPGA Tour, with a career record of 72 LPGA Tour titles, including 10 major victories. By the time Anna Nordqvist won her third major in 2021, she and her compatriots had the third most LPGA major championship titles of any nation, behind only the United States and South Korea. The first Swedish men's major victory came at the 2016 Open Championship through Henrik Stenson, after Parnevik, Niclas Fasth and Jonas Blixt had all recorded runner-up finishes.

== Courses ==
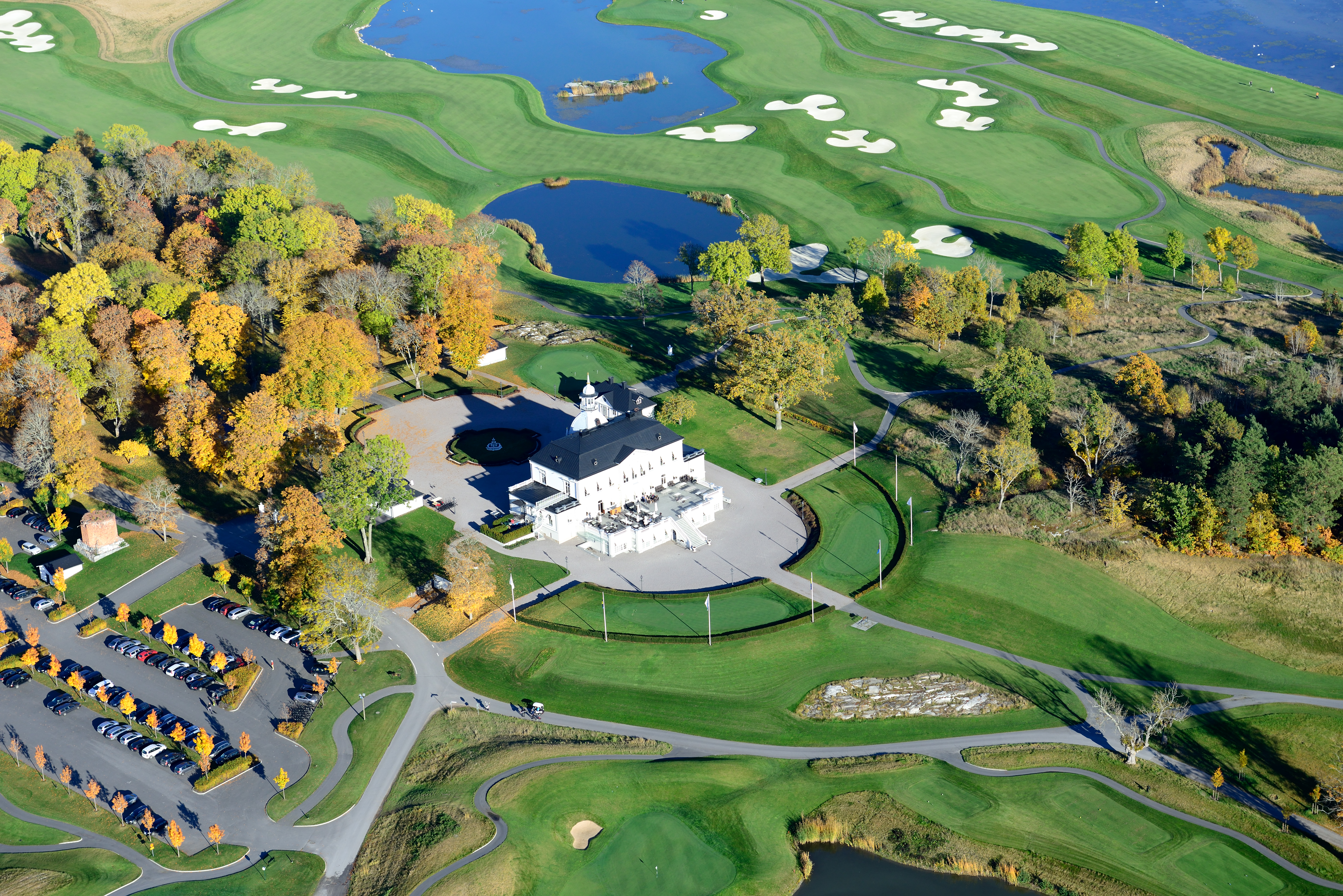
Bro Hof Slott GC

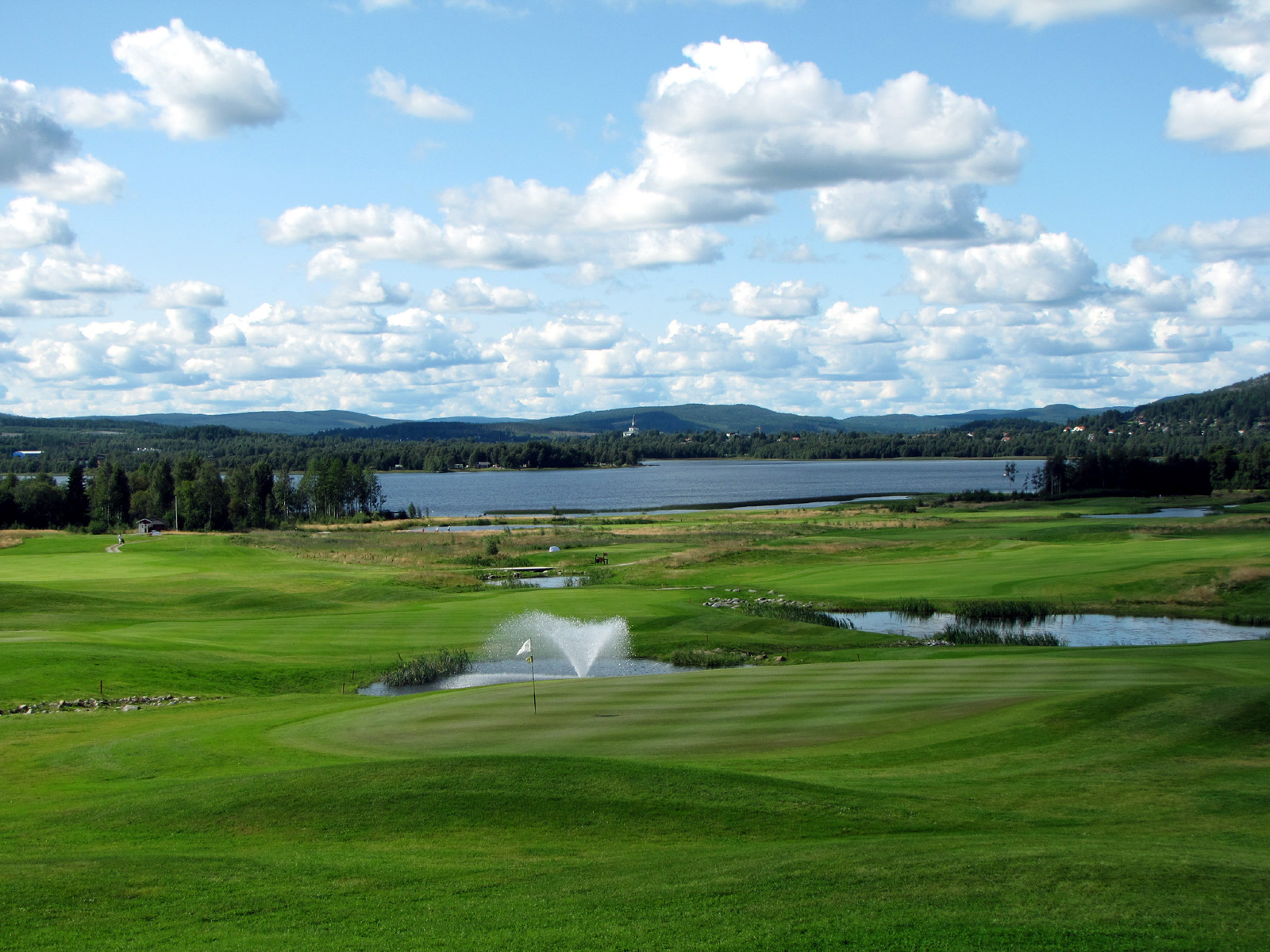
Veckefjärdens GC

As of January 2024, the number of golf clubs organized by the Swedish Golf Federation (SGF) was 445.

=== Top ranked courses ===
Golf Digest has continually ranked Swedish courses since 1993. Svensk Golf, a monthly publication attached to the Swedish Golf Federation, in 2020 published an updated ranking using the same methodology.

1. Visby GC
2. Bro Hof Slott GC – Stadium Course
3. Kristianstad GC – Åhus Östra
4. Ullna GC
5. Falsterbo GC
6. Halmstad GC – Norra
7. Vallda G&CC
8. Österåker GC – Öster by Stenson
9. PGA Sweden National – Links Course
10. Barsebäck G&CC – Masters Course
11. Vasatorp GC – Tournament Course
12. Ljunghusen GC – 1–18
13. Royal Drottningholm GC
14. Bro Hof Slott GC – Castle Course
15. Sand GC

== Tours ==
The Swedish Golf Tour has operated continuously since 1984, and the Swedish Golf Tour (women) since 1986. Recently most tournaments also feature on the Nordic Golf League and LET Access Series, respectively.

== Tournaments ==
=== National championships ===
The Swedish Golf Federation instituted the first national golf tournament in 1904. Notable tournaments include:

- Swedish Matchplay Championship (since 1904)
- Swedish International Stroke Play Championship (1945–2006)
- Swedish International (women) (1962–2007)
- Swedish PGA Championship (since 1970)
- Swedish PGA Championship (women) (since 1997)
- Swedish Junior Matchplay Championship (since 1939)
- Swedish Junior Strokeplay Championship (since 1977)

=== International tournaments ===
==== Professional ====
The Solheim Cup has been hosted twice:

- 2003 Solheim Cup at Barsebäck Golf & Country Club
- 2007 Solheim Cup at Halmstad Golf Club

The European Tour:

- Scandinavian Enterprise Open, played 1973–1990, rotated between Royal Drottningholm GC, Bokskogen GC, Vasatorp GC, Linköping GC and Ullna GC.
- PLM Open, played 1984–1990, mainly rotated between the links courses Falsterbo GC, Ljunghusen GC and Flommen GC.
- Scandinavian Masters, played 1991–2019, was typically hosted at Barsebäck G&CC, with stints at Kungsängen GC, Forsgården GC and Arlandastad Golf, before a new rota of Bro Hof Slott GC, PGA Sweden National and Hills GC was established in 2010.
- Scandinavian Mixed, played 2020–2024.

The Ladies European Tour:

- Scandinavian TPC hosted by Annika, played 1996–2008, was the longest running of over a dozen different LET tournaments hosted.

The Challenge Tour:

- Swedish courses hosted over a hundred Challenge Tour events 1990–2020.

==== Amateur ====
The International Golf Federation or European Golf Association:

- Sweden has hosted over 40 IGF or EGA events starting with the 1962 St Andrews Trophy at Halmstad GC.

Qualification event for the Junior Solheim Cup:

- Annika Invitational Europe (since 2012)

Ranking event in the EGA's European Amateur Order of Merit:

- Swedish International Men's Amateur Championship (since 2026)

== Golfers ==
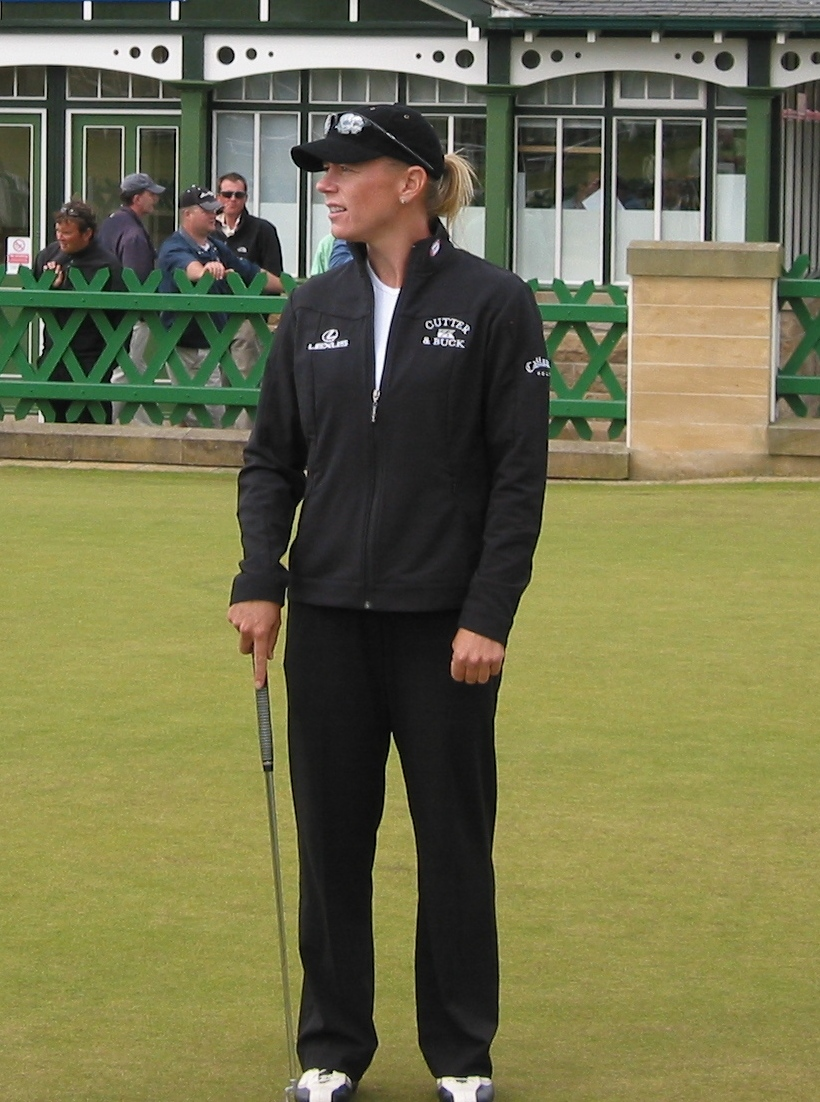
Annika Sörenstam recorded 72 LPGA Tour victories

As of October 2024, the number of active golfers organized by the Swedish Golf Federation was 506,000. This makes golf the third largest sport in Sweden in terms of active members, behind association football and athletics.

=== Swedish Golfer of the Year ===
Annika Sörenstam won Swedish Golfer of the Year nine times 1995–2005, and Henrik Stenson five times 2006–2016.

=== Swedish Golf Hall of Fame ===
Members include Annika Sörenstam, Liv Wollin, Henrik Stenson, Liselotte Neumann, Sven Tumba, Jesper Parnevik, Pia Nilsson, Göran Zachrisson, Helen Alfredsson and Robert Karlsson.

Hall of Fame Members

Member	Lifespan	Inducted	Description
Annika Sörenstam	1970–	2022	All-time great with 72 LPGA Tour victories including 10 majors. President of the International Golf Federation.
Viktor H. Setterberg	1859–1945	2022	The "father of golf" in the country. Built the first 18-hole course, founded the SGF in 1904.
Erik Runfelt	1893–1978	2022	Amateur champion with over 22 national titles. Secretary of the SGF, Editor-in-chief of Svensk Golf.
Liselotte Neumann	1966–	2022	First major winner (1988 U.S. Women's Open) with 25 worldwide professional wins.
Henrik Stenson	1976–	2022	First to win a men's major (2016 Open Championship). Olympic medalist, FedEx Cup and Race to Dubai winner.
Liv Wollin	1945–	2022	The nation's most accomplished female amateur golfer of all time (23 national titles).
Sven Tumba	1931–2011	2022	Champion of the game of golf. Brought the European Tour to Sweden in 1973 (Scandinavian Enterprise Open)
Jesper Parnevik	1965–	2023	First to make a name for himself on the PGA Tour (5 victories). Showman and personality with two runner-ups at The Open.
Pia Nilsson	1958–	2023	Pioneering player (LPGA Tour) and National Team coach (men and women). First to captain the Solheim Cup (1998).
Göran Zachrisson	1938–2021	2023	The nation's most known and respected golf journalist. Covered The Open Championship for over 50 years.
Helen Alfredsson	1965	2024	LPGA Tour Rookie of the Year and major winner (1993). Senior major Grand Slam winner (2019).
Douglas Brasier	1906–1991	2024	British pro, immigrated in 1929. Founded the PGA of Sweden. Prolific coach and course architect for over 6 decades.
Robert Karlsson	1969–	2025	Eleven European Tour titles and first to win the Order of Merit (2008). Four Ryder Cup as player or vice captain.
John Cockin	1939–2024	2025	British pro, immigrated in 1962. Two European Circuit titles and chairman of the PGA of Sweden for almost two decades.
Fanny Sunesson	1967–	2026	Caddie, notable for caddying for Nick Faldo 1990–1999 and the first female caddie to win a men's major golf championship.
Anders Janson	1939–2003	2026	Golf journalist, editor-in-chief of Svensk Golf for over two decades 1973–1994.

=== Caddie Hall of Fame ===
Fanny Sunesson, who caddied for Nick Faldo 1990–1999 and is the first female caddie to win a men's major golf championship, was inducted into the Caddie Hall of Fame in 2003.

== National Amateur Squad ==
The Swedish Golf Team is the national squad. Amateur players from the age of 13 are trained and selected by the SGF to represent the country in international tournaments. The first win came at the 1959 European Amateur Team Championship. Notably, the women's team won the European Ladies' Team Championship three consecutive years 2018, 2019 and 2020, with players such as Linn Grant, Maja Stark, Frida Kinhult and Ingrid Lindblad.

In 2023, Ingrid Lindblad and Ludvig Åberg briefly topped the World Amateur Golf Ranking simultaneously.

=== Achievements ===
National Amateur Squad

Team Wins

Organizer	Event	Years	Total
IGF	World Amateur Team Championship (Eisenhower Trophy)	1990	1
IGF	Women's World Amateur Team Championship (Espirito Santo Trophy)	2004; 2008; 2022	3
EGA	European Amateur Team Championship	1959; 1961; 2019; 2024	4
EGA	European Ladies' Team Championship	1981; 1987; 1997; 2001; 2008; 2010; 2011; 2018; 2019; 2020	10
EGA	European Boys' Team Championship	1983; 1991; 1993; 2001; 2008; 2012; 2023	7
EGA	European Girls' Team Championship	1995; 2000; 2004; 2007; 2008; 2012; 2013; 2017	8
EGA	European Youths' Team Championship	1963; 1969; 1970; 1976; 1980; 1992; 2002	7
EGA	European Lady Junior's Team Championship	1978; 1981; 1984; 1990; 1994; 2006	6
EGA	European Young Masters	2018	1

Individual Wins

Organizer	Event	Years	Total
EGA	European Amateur	1986 Anders Haglund; 1990 Klas Eriksson; 1996 Daniel Olsson; 2000 Carl Pettersson	4
EGA	European Ladies Amateur	1995 Maria Hjorth; 2007 Caroline Hedwall; 2009 Caroline Hedwall; 2021 Ingrid Lindblad	4
R&A	The Amateur Championship	1988 Cristian Härdin	1
R&A	The Women's Amateur Championship	2004 Louise Stahle; 2005 Louise Stahle; 2008 Anna Nordqvist; 2016 Julia Engström	4
R&A	Ladies' British Strokeplay Championship	2017 Linn Grant	1
R&A	Boys Amateur Championship	1992 Leif Westerberg; 2014 Oskar Bergqvist; 2015 Marcus Svensson; 2022 Albert Hansson; 2024 Viggo Olsson Mörk	5
R&A	Girls Amateur Championship	1991 Maria Hjorth; 2005 Anna Nordqvist; 2024 Havanna Torstensson	3

Ranking

Organizer	Class	#1 Players	Total
World Amateur Golf Ranking	Women	2019 Frida Kinhult; 2023 Ingrid Lindblad	2
World Amateur Golf Ranking	Men	2023 Ludvig Åberg	1
European Amateur Golf Ranking	Women	2010 Caroline Hedwall; 2019 Frida Kinhult; 2020 Ingrid Lindblad; 2021 Ingrid Lindblad; 2022 Ingrid Lindblad; 2023 Ingrid Lindblad	5
European Amateur Golf Ranking	Men	2021 Ludvig Åberg; 2022 Ludvig Åberg	2

== Notable touring professionals ==
Updated as of 6 September 2026.

Swedish professional golfers have collectively won over a hundred European Tour titles and also over a hundred LPGA Tour titles. Notable golfers listed below are those with a win or runner-up finish on any of the principlal international tours. (Note: Players with or eligible for Swedish nationality that have chosen to represent other countries (e.g. Jenny Lidback, Carl Suneson, Camilla Hedberg) are not included. Players that have switched their nationality (e.g. Caroline Westrup, Paul Nilbrink) are included if they represented Sweden at the time of their achievement. Several players, such as Annika Sörenstam, have assumed U.S. citizenship, but continued to use Sweden as sporting nationality.) (Note: The principal tours in this centext are defined as the PGA Tour (USA), European Tour (EUR), Asian Tour (ASA), Sunshine Tour (AFR), Korn Ferry Tour (KFT), Challenge Tour (CHA) and LIV Golf League (LIV) for men, and the LPGA Tour (LPGA), Ladies European Tour (LET), LPGA of Japan Tour (JP), LPGA of Korea Tour (KR), Ladies Asian Golf Tour (AS), Epson Tour (EPS), WPGA Tour of Australasia (AU), and Sunshine Ladies Tour (AF) for women. In addition, the senior tours PGA Tour Champions (CMP) and European Senior Tour (EST) for men, and the Legends Tour (LEG) for women are included. A record of these wins is maintained by the Swedish Golf Federation.)

=== Male tour golfers ===
List of male tour golfers

Player	Born	Main Tour wins					Other Tour wins				Senior Tour wins		World Rank (Note: Career best position in the Official World Golf Rankings.)		Awards and notes
Player	Born	MAJ	LIV	USA	EUR	First-Last	ASA	AFR	KFT (PTA)	CHA	CMP	EST	Pos	Year	Awards and notes
**Henrik Stenson**^	1976	1	1	6	11	2001–2022	1	1		3			2	2014	FedEx Cup **#1** (2013); Race to Dubai **#1** (2013 · 2016); Golfer of the Year (2013 · 2016)
**Robert Karlsson**^	1969			(RU)	11	1995–2010					(RU)		6	2008	European Tour Order of Merit **#1** (2008); Harry Vardon Trophy (2008)
**Jesper Parnevik**^	1965	(RU)		5	4	1993–2001					1		7	2000	
**Alex Norén**	1982			(RU)	12	2009–2025	2			1			8	2017	Race to Dubai #3 (2016)
Carl Pettersson	1977			5	1	2002–2012							23	2006	
**Ludvig Åberg**	1999	(RU)		2	1	2023–2025							4	**2025**	
**Jonas Blixt**	1984	(RU)		3		2012–2017				(RU)			33	2014	
Daniel Chopra	1973			2		2007–2008	1		3	2			60	2008	
Gabriel Hjertstedt	1971			2		1997–1999							111	1999	First PGA Tour win (1997)
**Fredrik Jacobson**^	1974			1	3	2003–2011					(RU)		16	2004	European Tour Order of Merit #4 (2003)
**Vincent Norrman**	1997			1	2	2023			(RU)				71	2023	
Richard S. Johnson	1976			1	2	2002–2010				1			94	2006	
David Lingmerth	1987			1		2015			2				35	2016	
**Niclas Fasth**^	1972	(RU)			6	2000–2007				4			18	2007	
Peter Hanson	1977				6	2005–2012				1			17	2012	Race to Dubai #4 (2012)
Anders Forsbrand	1961				6	1987–1995						1	35	1993	European Tour Order of Merit #4 (1992)
Per-Ulrik Johansson	1966				6	1991–2007							40	1997	Rookie of the Year (1991)
**Jarmo Sandelin**^	1967				5	1995–2001	1			2		2	59	1999	Rookie of the Year (1995)
Mathias Grönberg	1970				4	1995–2003		1	1	1			65	2003	
**Johan Edfors**^	1975				3	2006	2			4		1	44	2006	
Peter Hedblom	1970				3	1997–2009				4			77	2008	
Mats Lanner	1961				3	1987–1998				4			84	1989	
**Mikael Lundberg**^	1973				3	2005–2014				3		1	145	2009	
Pierre Fulke	1971				3	1999–2000				2			26	2001	
**Joakim Haeggman**^	1969				3	1993–2004				2		2	39	2004	
Ove Sellberg	1959				3	1986–1990							96	1989	First European Tour win (1986)
**Patrik Sjöland**^	1971				2	1998–2000	1			1		1	48	1998	European Senior Tour Rookie of the Year (2023)
Kristoffer Broberg	1986				2	2015–2021				4			64	2015	
**Michael Jonzon**^	1972				2	1997–2009				2		(RU)	159	1997	
**Rikard Karlberg**	1986				1	2015	2						69	2016	
Alexander Björk	1990				1	2018	1			1			59	2018	
Adam Mednick	1966				1	2002				6			295	2002	
**Joakim Lagergren**	1991				1	2018				3			108	**2025**	
Fredrik Andersson Hed	1972				1	2010				2			68	2010	
**Sebastian Söderberg**	1990				1	2019				2			86	2024	
**Jesper Svensson**	1996				1	2024				1			89	**2025**	Rookie of the Year (2024)
**Mikael Lindberg**	1993				1	2026		1		2			127	**2026**	
Christian Nilsson	1979				1	2009				1			150	2010	
Chris Hanell	1973				1	2004				1			162	2004	
**Simon Forsström**	1989				1	2023				1			222	2023	
Joakim Bäckström	1978				1	2005				1			276	2006	
**Marcus Kinhult**	1996				1	2019		(RU)		(RU)			81	2020	
Oskar Henningsson	1985				1	2009							192	2009	
**Henrik Norlander**	1987			(RU)		(2016–2023)			2				96	2020	
**Tim Widing**	1997								2				108	2024	
**Pontus Nyholm**	1998								1				210	**2025**	
**Christofer Blomstrand**	1991				(RU)	(2018)		1		3			282	2021	
**Anton Karlsson**	1993				(RU)	(2019)		1		1			288	2019	
Dennis Edlund	1965				(RU)	(1997)				5			222	1997	
**Magnus Persson Atlevi**^	1965				(RU)	(1987–1990)				3		2	131	1990	European Senior Tour Order of Merit #2 (2016); European Senior Tour Rookie of the Year (2016)
Johan Ryström	1964				(RU)	(1992–1993)				3			151	1991	
**Jens Dantorp**	1989				(RU)	(2023)				3			152	2023	
Joel Sjöholm	1985				(RU)	(2019)				2			228	2011	
Olle Karlsson	1969				(RU)	(1998)				1			167	2001	
Magnus A. Carlsson	1980				(RU)	(2008)				1			176	2008	
Mårten Olander	1971				(RU)	(2003)				1			212	2003	
Anders Gillner	1967				(RU)	(1993)				1			237	1993	
Martin Erlandsson	1974				(RU)	(2005–2009)				1			248	2006	
Steven Jeppesen	1984				(RU)	(2004)				(RU)			357	2006	
Pelle Edberg	1979				(RU)	(2008–2015)							143	2007	
Peter Gustafsson	1976				(RU)	(2005–2011)							237	2005	Tour de las Américas **#1** (2009)
Henrik Nyström	1969				(RU)	(2000–2006)							244	2002	
Olle Nordberg	1967						1			2			422	1995	
**Björn Hellgren**	1990						1			(RU)			343	2021	
**Charlie Lindh**	1997						1						305	**2026**	
Stephen Lindskog	1967						1						486	2000	
Malcolm Kokocinski	1991						1						269	2018	
**Björn Åkesson**	1989							1		1			304	2016	
Philip Eriksson	1991							1					307	2019	
Johan Sköld	1975							(1)					435	2005	
Klas Eriksson	1971									5			226	1994	
Fredrik Henge	1974									5			381	2000	
Johan Axgren	1975									4			190	2006	
Per Nyman	1968									4			352	1999	
Mikael Krantz	1965									4			478	1993	
Fredrik Larsson	1968									4			636	1994	
Mats Hallberg	1964									3			174	1998	
Fredrik Widmark	1975									3			297	2005	
Kalle Brink	1975									3			400	2006	
Joakim Rask	1972									3			538	1998	
Oscar Lengdén	1992									2			186	2017	
Fredrik Lindgren	1966									2			253	1993	
Leif Westerberg	1974									2			257	2007	
Jens Fahrbring	1984									2			259	2015	
Eric Carlberg	1974									2			306	2000	
Pehr Magnebrant	1970									2			476	2002	
Per G. Nyman	1974									2			561	2005	
Paul Nilbrink	1971									2			567	2000	
Daniel Westermark	1963									2			741	1999	
Vilhelm Forsbrand	1970									2			n/a	1991	
Adam Blommé	1996							(RU)		1			355	2023	
Johan Carlsson	1986									1			166	2014	
Oscar Florén	1984									1			203	2011	
**Hugo Townsend**	1999									1			300	**2025**	
Oscar Stark	1988									1			307	2017	
Raimo Sjöberg	1970									1			444	2000	
Anders Haglund	1964									1			688	2006	
**Daniel Svärd**	2003								(1)				559	**2026**	
Fredrik From	1996							(RU)					791	2017	
Mattias Eliasson	1975									(RU)			230	2006	
**Adam Wallin**	2001									(RU)			313	**2026**	
Joakim Wikström	1991									(RU)			328	2021	
Jesper Kennegård	1988									(RU)			353	2021	
Pontus Widegren	1990									(RU)			402	2012	
**Tobias Jonsson**	2000									(RU)			383	**2026**	
**Per Längfors**	1989									(RU)			414	2018	
**Robin Petersson**	1992									(RU)			493	2021	
**Christofer Rahm**	1998									(RU)			541	2024	
**Jesper Sandborg**	1993									(RU)			582	2024	
**David Lundgren**	2001									(RU)			753	**2026**	
Peter Malmgren	1971									(RU)			660	2002	
Rikard Strångert	1972									(RU)					
Total		1	1	29	121	1986–2026	16	7	11 (1)	177	1	9			

Ryder Cup player Winner Runner-up Golfers in **bold** are active on tour as of 2026 (^ indicates active on a senior tour)

=== Female tour golfers ===
List of female tour golfers

Player	Born	Main Tour wins (Note: M.E. is LET major only. Women's British Open turned LPGA major in 2001, The Evian in 2013.)					Other Tour wins							World Rank (Note: Career best position in the Women's World Golf Rankings. Officially introduced in February 2006, hence not available for players active in prior years. Full list of all ranked players available at the official WWGR site and its archive.)		Awards and notes
Player	Born	MAJ	M.E.	LPGA	LET	First-Last	JP	AU	KR	AS	AF	EPS	LEG	Pos	Year	Awards and notes
Annika Sörenstam HoF	1970	10	2	72	17	1995–2008	2	4		1			1	1	2006	LPGA **#1** 1995 · 1997-1998 · 2001–2005; LET **#1** 1995; 8 LPGA Player of the Year (record); 3rd most LPGA Tour wins
**Anna Nordqvist**	1987	3		9	5	2009–2022								4	2017	LET Rookie of the Year 2009; LPGA Rookie of the Year Runner-Up 2009
Liselotte Neumann	1966	1	1	13	11	1985–2004	2	1		1			4	2	1994	LET **#1** 1994; LPGA Rookie of the Year 1988; First LPGA & Major winner (1988); Solheim Cup captain 2013
Helen Alfredsson	1965	1	4	7	11	1990–2008	3	1					2	8	2008	LET **#1** 1998; LET Rookie of the Year 1989; LPGA Rookie of the Year 1992; Solheim Cup captain 2007; Senior women's major grand slam (2019)
**Maja Stark**	1999	1		1	6	2021–2025		1						6	2025	LET Lowest stroke average 2022
Sophie Gustafson	1973	(RU)	1	5	16	1996–2011				1				17	2003	LET **#1** 2000 · 2003 · 2007 · 2009; LET Player of the Year 1998 · 2000 · 2003
Maria McBride (née Hjorth)	1973	(RU)		5	2	1999–2011							2	16	2008	Senior women's major grand slam (2026)
**Linn Grant**	1999			2	6	2022–2025					3			15	2023	LET **#1** 2022; LET Rookie of the Year 2022
Caroline Hedwall	1989			(RU)	7	2011–2022		3	1					22	2013	LET Player of the Year 2011; LET Rookie of the Year 2011
Pernilla Lindberg	1986	1		1	(RU)	2018								29	2018	
Carin Koch (née Hjalmarsson)	1971			2	1	2000–2005								9	2002	Solheim Cup captain 2015
**Madelene Sagström**	1992	(RU)		2	(RU)	2020–2025						3		25	2022	Symetra #1 2016
Catrin Nilsmark	1967		1	1	2	1994–1999								81	2002	Solheim Cup captain 2003 · 2005
**Ingrid Lindblad**	2000			1		2025						1		36	2025	
Charlotta Sörenstam	1973			1		2000			1					79	2002	
Louise Friberg	1980			1		2008								72	2008	
**Linnea Ström**	1996			1	(RU)	2024						2		93	2024	Epson #1 2022
Linda Wessberg	1980				3	2006–2009								71	2007	
Cecilia Ekelundh	1978				3	2004–2006										
Sofia Grönberg-Whitmore	1965				3	1989–1999				1						
Kärstin Ehrnlund	1959				2	1980–1984										First LET winner (1980)
Lotta Wahlin	1983				2	2008										
Julia Engström	2001				2	2020								164	2020	LET #2 2020; LET Rookie of the Year 2018
Åsa Gottmo	1971				1	2002								52	2002	
Marlene Hedblom	1972				1	2003										
Camilla Lennarth	1988				1	2014								105	2014	
Johanna Gustavsson	1992				1	2023								108	2024	LET Player of the Year 2023
Anna Oxenstierna	1963				1	1989										
Marie Wennersten-From	1958				1	1985										
Johanna Johansson (née Westerberg)	1977				1	2009										
Emma Zackrisson	1979				1	2008										
Jenny Haglund	1993				1	2018						1		168	2018	
**Lisa Pettersson**	1995				1	2023					(RU)			224	2023	
**Meja Örtengren**	2025				1	2025								402	**2025**	
Charlotte Montgomery	1958			(RU)		(1983)										First LPGA Player
Mikaela Parmlid	1980			(RU)	(RU)	(2012–2014)										
Louise Stahle	1985				(RU)	(2007–2008)						(RU)		112	2008	LET Rookie of the Year 2007
Pernilla Sterner	1968				(RU)	(1996)				2						
Maria Bodén	1978				(RU)	(2008)					1					
**Kajsa Arwefjäll**	2000				(RU)	(2025–2026)								160	**2026**	
Jessica Karlsson	1992				(RU)	(2022)								214	2022	
Lynn Carlsson	1994				(RU)	(2019)								259	2019	
Lina Boqvist	1991				(RU)	(2019)								289	2016	
Emma Nilsson	1994				(RU)	(2020)								307	2018	
Nina Reis	1980				(RU)	(2008)										
Anna Berg	1973				(RU)	(2001)										LET Rookie of the Year 1997
Lisa Hed	1973				(RU)	(2000)										
Sofia Renell	1980				(RU)	(2007)										
Helene Koch (née Andersson)	1978				(RU)	(1996)										
Frida Gustafsson Spång	1993				(RU)	(2021)								577	2017	
**Moa Folke**	1995				(RU)	(2023)					1			222	2023	
Sara Kjellker	1998				(RU)	(2023)								162	2024	
Petra Rigby-Jinglöv	1969									1						
Helena Svensson	1979										1					
Helena Alterby	1978										1					
Daniela Holmqvist	1988							1				1		162	2019	
**Frida Kinhult**	1999											1		147	2023	
Sofie Andersson	1983											1				
Kristina Tucker (née Engström)	1980											1				
Louise Ridderström	1993											1		376	2019	
Linnea Johansson	1993											(RU)		301	2023	
Total		17	9	125	106 (Note: Anna Nordqvist and Sophie Gustafson won the European Nations Cup together in 2010 and 2011)	1980–2025	7	10	1	7	6	12	9			

Solheim Cup player Winner Runner-up Golfers in **bold** are active on (a non-senior) tour as of 2026

== Golfers in multisport and professional team events ==
Between 2016 and 2024, ten different golfers represented Sweden at the olympics. Henrik Stenson won a medal at the 2016 Summer Olympics.

Ludvig Åberg was the 12th Ryder Cup player from Sweden, while Pia Nilsson, Catrin Nilsmark, Helen Alfredsson, Carin Koch and Annika Sörenstam have all been Solheim Cup captains.

Anders Forsbrand and Per-Ulrik Johansson won the 1991 World Cup. Liselotte Neumann and Helen Alfredsson won the 1992 Sunrise Cup World Team Championship.

=== Golf at the Summer Olympics ===
Participation at the Olympics

Golf at the Summer Olympics

Golf	Games of Olympiad	II	III	XXXI	XXXII	XXXIII
Golf	Year	1900	1904	2016	2020	2024
Golf	Host country Athlete	(France)	(United States)	(Brazil)	(Japan)	(France)
Men's	**Henrik Stenson**	DNP	DNP	Silver medal		
Men's	David Lingmerth	DNP	DNP	T11		
Men's	Henrik Norlander	DNP	DNP		T45	
Men's	Alex Norén	DNP	DNP		T16	T45
Men's	Ludvig Åberg	DNP	DNP			T18
Women's	Anna Nordqvist	DNP	DNP	T11	T23	
Women's	Pernilla Lindberg	DNP	DNP	T31		
Women's	Madelene Sagström	DNP	DNP		T20	
Women's	Maja Stark	DNP	DNP			T10
Women's	Linn Grant	DNP	DNP			T27
Total	10	—	—	4	4	4

Golf at the Summer Youth Olympics

Golf	Year	2014	2018	2022
Golf	Host country Athlete	(China)	(Argentina)	(Senegal)
Men's	**Marcus Kinhult**	Silver medal		P O S T P O N E D
Men's	Ludvig Eriksson		T26	P O S T P O N E D
Women's	Linnea Ström	T12		P O S T P O N E D
Women's	Amanda Linnér		30	P O S T P O N E D
Mixed Team	**Marcus Kinhult**; **Linnea Ström**	Silver medal		P O S T P O N E D
Mixed Team	Ludvig Eriksson; Amanda Linnér		T23	P O S T P O N E D
Total	4	2	2	—

Competitor Medalist in **bold**

=== Ryder Cup and Solheim Cup ===
Ryder Cup and Solheim Cup

Ryder Cup

	1993	1995	1997	1999	2002	2004	2006	2008	2010	2012	2014	2016	2018	2021	2023	2025
Host country	(England)	(United States)	(Spain)	(United States)	(England)	(United States)	(Republic of Ireland)	(United States)	(Wales)	(United States)	(Scotland)	(United States)	(France)	(United States)	(Italy)	(United States)
Winning team	(United States)	(Europe)	(Europe)	(United States)	(Europe)	(Europe)	(Europe)	(United States)	(Europe)	(Europe)	(Europe)	(United States)	(Europe)	(United States)	(Europe)	(Europe)
Joakim Haeggman																
**Per-Ulrik Johansson**																
**Jesper Parnevik**																
Jarmo Sandelin																
**Niclas Fasth**																
**Pierre Fulke**																
Anders Forsbrand																
**Robert Karlsson**																
**Henrik Stenson**															(Note: Stenson was named the 2023 European Ryder Cup captain, but his captaincy was terminated after 4 months when he signed with LIV Golf.)	
**Peter Hanson**																
**Alex Norén**																
**Ludvig Åberg**																
Total players	1	1	2	2	3	—	2	2	1	1	1	1	2	—	1	1

Europe captain Player – Automatic qualifier Player – Captain's pick Non-playing vice-captain Winner in **bold**

Solheim Cup

	1990	1992	1994	1996	1998	2000	2002	2003	2005	2007	2009	2011	2013	2015	2017	2019	2021	2023	2024	2026	Player statistics								
Host country	(United States)	(Scotland)	(United States)	(Wales)	(United States)	(Scotland)	(United States)	(Sweden)	(United States)	(Sweden)	(United States)	(Republic of Ireland)	(United States)	(Germany)	(United States)	(Scotland)	(United States)	(Spain)	(United States)	(Netherlands)	Year		Cups	Matches	Points	Win %	W	L	H
Winning team	(United States)	(Europe)	(United States)	(United States)	(United States)	(Europe)	(United States)	(Europe)	(United States)	(United States)	(United States)	(Europe)	(Europe)	(United States)	(United States)	(Europe)	(Europe)	(Europe)	(United States)		First	Last	Cups	Matches	Points	Win %	W	L	H
**Helen Alfredsson**																					1990	2009	8	28	12	43%	11	15	2
**Liselotte Neumann**																					1990	2000	6	21	8.5	40%	6	10	5
**Catrin Nilsmark**																					1992	2000	5	16	8.5	53%	8	7	1
**Annika Sörenstam**																					1994	2007	8	37	24	65%	22	11	4
**Sophie Gustafson**																					1998	2011	8	31	16	52%	13	12	6
Charlotta Sörenstam																					1998	1998	1	4	1.5	38%	1	2	1
Pia Nilsson																													
**Carin Koch**																					2000	2005	4	16	11.5	72%	10	3	3
**Maria Hjorth McBride**																					2002	2011	5	21	8.5	40%	6	10	5
Linda Wessberg																					2007	2007	1	2	1.5	75%	1	0	1
**Anna Nordqvist**																					2009	2024	9	35	18.5	53%	17	15	3
**Caroline Hedwall**																					2011	2023	5	17	9.5	56%	9	7	1
**Madelene Sagström**																					2017	2024	4	12	5.5	46%	5	6	1
**Linn Grant**																					2023	2024	2	9	3	33%	3	6	0
**Maja Stark**																					2023	2024	2	8	4	50%	3	3	2
Total players	2	3	4	4	6	6	5	4	4	4	4	3	2	2	2	2	2	5	4										

Europe captain Non-playing assistant captain Playing assistant captain Player – Automatic qualifier Player – Captain's pick Winner in **bold**

=== World Cup of Golf ===
World Cup

Men

	World Cup									World Cup of Golf							WGC-World Cup							World Cup (of Golf)							Apps.	Best finish
Player	83	84	85	87	88	89	90	91	92	93	94	95	96	97	98	99	00	01	02	03	04	05	06	07	08	09	11	13	16	18	Apps.	Best finish
Magnus Persson																															3	T10
Ove Sellberg						3rd place, bronze medalist(s)																									4	3rd place, bronze medalist(s)
**Anders Forsbrand**								1st place, gold medalist(s)	2nd place, silver medalist(s)																						6	1st place, gold medalist(s)
Johan Ryström																															1	9
Mats Lanner						3rd place, bronze medalist(s)																									3	3rd place, bronze medalist(s)
**Per-Ulrik Johansson**								1st place, gold medalist(s)	2nd place, silver medalist(s)																						3	1st place, gold medalist(s)
Joakim Haeggman											3rd place, bronze medalist(s)																				4	3rd place, bronze medalist(s)
Jesper Parnevik											3rd place, bronze medalist(s)																				2	3rd place, bronze medalist(s)
Jarmo Sandelin																															3	9
Patrik Sjöland																															3	5
Mathias Grönberg																															2	5
Pierre Fulke																															1	T7
Niclas Fasth																						2nd place, silver medalist(s)									4	2nd place, silver medalist(s)
**Robert Karlsson**																									1st place, gold medalist(s)	2nd place, silver medalist(s)					5	1st place, gold medalist(s)
Carl Pettersson																							3rd place, bronze medalist(s)								2	3rd place, bronze medalist(s)
Freddie Jacobson																															2	T7
**Henrik Stenson**																						2nd place, silver medalist(s)	3rd place, bronze medalist(s)		1st place, gold medalist(s)	2nd place, silver medalist(s)					4	1st place, gold medalist(s)
Peter Hanson																															2	T6
Alex Norén																															2	5
Jonas Blixt																															1	11
David Lingmerth																															1	5
Alexander Björk																															1	9
Joakim Lagergren																															1	9
Total	T11	T10	9	7	T19	T3	17	1	2	T13	3	9	13	WD	T11	5	T7	16	T14	T7	T7	T2	3	T6	1	T2	25	11	5	9		

Player Qualified but did not play Winner in **bold**

Women

	S. Cup	World Cup					European Nations Cup				International Crown					
	1992	2000	2005	2006	2007	2008	2008	2009	2010	2011	2014	2016	2018	2020	2023	2025
Tours	LET		LPGA & LET				LET				LPGA					
Host country	(Chinese Taipei)	(Republic of Ireland)	(South Africa)	(South Africa)	(South Africa)	(South Africa)	(Spain)	(Spain)	(Spain)	(Spain)	(United States)	(United States)	(South Korea)	(England)	(United States)	(South Korea)
Winning team	(Sweden)	(Sweden)	(Japan)	(Sweden)	(Paraguay)	(Philippines)	(England)	(Netherlands)	(Sweden)	(Sweden)	(Spain)	(United States)	(South Korea)	C A N C E L L E D	(Thailand)	
**Annika Sörenstam**				Gold medal										C A N C E L L E D		
**Liselotte Neumann**	Gold medal			Gold medal										C A N C E L L E D		
**Helen Alfredsson**	Gold medal													C A N C E L L E D		
**Carin Koch**		Gold medal												C A N C E L L E D		
**Sophie Gustafson**		Gold medal							Gold medal	Gold medal				C A N C E L L E D		
Maria Hjorth														C A N C E L L E D		
Johanna Westerberg														C A N C E L L E D		
Lotta Wahlin														C A N C E L L E D		
**Anna Nordqvist**									Gold medal	Gold medal	Silver medal			C A N C E L L E D		
Caroline Hedwall											Silver medal			C A N C E L L E D		
Pernilla Lindberg											Silver medal			C A N C E L L E D		
Mikaela Parmlid											Silver medal			C A N C E L L E D		
Madelene Sagström														C A N C E L L E D		
Maja Stark														C A N C E L L E D		
Linn Grant														C A N C E L L E D		
Ingrid Lindblad																

Seeded player Unseeded player Qualified but did not play Winner in **bold**

=== Other international cups ===
International Cups

Alfred Dunhill Cup

Player	85	86	87	88	89	90	91	92	93	94	95	96	97	98	99	00	Apps.	Best finish
**Mats Lanner**							1st place, gold medalist(s)										4	1st place, gold medalist(s)
Ove Sellberg																	5	T5
**Anders Forsbrand**							1st place, gold medalist(s)		3rd place, bronze medalist(s)								7	1st place, gold medalist(s)
Magnus Persson																	3	T5
**Per-Ulrik Johansson**							1st place, gold medalist(s)						2nd place, silver medalist(s)				6	1st place, gold medalist(s)
Robert Karlsson																	1	T5
Jesper Parnevik									3rd place, bronze medalist(s)				2nd place, silver medalist(s)				4	2nd place, silver medalist(s)
Joakim Haeggman									3rd place, bronze medalist(s)				2nd place, silver medalist(s)				3	2nd place, silver medalist(s)
Gabriel Hjertstedt															3rd place, bronze medalist(s)		2	3rd place, bronze medalist(s)
Jarmo Sandelin												3rd place, bronze medalist(s)			3rd place, bronze medalist(s)		3	3rd place, bronze medalist(s)
Peter Hedblom												3rd place, bronze medalist(s)					1	3rd place, bronze medalist(s)
Patrik Sjöland												3rd place, bronze medalist(s)			3rd place, bronze medalist(s)		4	3rd place, bronze medalist(s)
Mathias Grönberg																	2	T5
Total	–	T9	T9	T9	T5	T9	1	T5	T3	T9	T8	T3	2	T5	T3	T5	15	Win

Player Winner in **bold**

Seve Trophy and Team Cup

	Seve Trophy								Team Cup	
	2000	2002	2003	2005	2007	2009	2011	2013	2023	2025
Host country	(England)	(Republic of Ireland)	(Spain)	(England)	(Republic of Ireland)	(France)	(France)	(France)	(United Arab Emirates)	(United Arab Emirates)
Winning team	(Europe)	(United Kingdom)	(United Kingdom)	(United Kingdom)	(United Kingdom)	(United Kingdom)	(United Kingdom)	(Europe)	(Europe)	(United Kingdom)
**Robert Karlsson**										
**Jarmo Sandelin**										
Niclas Fasth										
Freddie Jacobson										
Peter Hanson										
Henrik Stenson										
**Alex Norén**										
Jonas Blixt										
Total	2	2	2	3	2	3	2	—	1	—

Player – Automatic qualifier Qualified but did not play Winner in **bold**

Royal Trophy and EurAsia Cup

	Royal Trophy							EurAsia Cup		
	2006	2007	2009	2010	2011	2012	2013	2014	2016	2018
Host country	(Thailand)	(Thailand)	(Thailand)	(Thailand)	(Thailand)	(China)	(Brunei)	(Malaysia)	(Malaysia)	(Malaysia)
Winning team	(Europe)	(Europe)	Asia	(Europe)	(Europe)	Asia	(Europe)	Tie	(Europe)	(Europe)
Henrik Stenson										
Niclas Fasth										
Robert Karlsson										
Johan Edfors										
Peter Hanson										
Alex Norén										
Fredrik Andersson Hed										
Kristoffer Broberg										
Total	1	4	2	4	4	1	—	—	1	2

Player Qualified but did not play Winner in **bold**
