= List of golf courses in Sweden =

A list of golf courses in Sweden by region and district.

Historical development in SGF club membership 1900–2020
Year	Golf Clubs	Change
1900	–	–
1910	4	–
1920	4	–
1930	10	150%
1940	22	120%
1950	33	50%
1960	59	79%
1970	110	86%
1980	149	35%
1990	271	82%
2000	396	46%
2020	450	14%

As of January 2024, the number of golf clubs organized by the Swedish Golf Federation (SGF) was 446.

== Notable courses ==
The premier courses are concentrated in the vicinity of the metropolitan areas of Stockholm, Malmö and Gothenburg, with some exceptions such as Visby GC on the island of Gotland, and Sand GC near Jönköping.

Tournament venues in Sweden
Solheim Cup
European Tour
European Senior Tour
Ladies European Tour

=== Rankings ===
Golf Digest has continually ranked Swedish courses since 1993. Svensk Golf, the former monthly publication of the Swedish Golf Federation, in 2020 published an updated ranking using the same methodology.

1. Visby GC
2. Bro Hof Slott GC – Stadium Course
3. Kristianstad GC – Åhus Östra
4. Ullna GC
5. Falsterbo GC
6. Halmstad GC – Norra
7. Vallda G&CC
8. Österåker GC – Öster by Stenson
9. PGA Sweden National – Links Course
10. Barsebäck G&CC – Masters Course
11. Vasatorp GC – Tournament Course
12. Ljunghusen GC – 1–18
13. Royal Drottningholm GC
14. Bro Hof Slott GC – Castle Course
15. Sand GC

=== Links courses ===
Links courses include Falsterbo GC, Flommen GC, Ljunghusen GC, Grönhögen Golf Links and Helsingborg GC – Viken Links.

=== Tournament courses ===
Sweden has hosted the Solheim Cup twice, 2003 at Barsebäck G&CC and 2007 at Halmstad GC.

On the European Tour the Scandinavian Enterprise Open was played 1973–1990, rotating between Royal Drottningholm GC, Bokskogen GC, Vasatorp GC, Linköping GC and Ullna G&CC. The PLM Open, played 1984–1990, mainly rotated between the links courses Falsterbo GC, Ljunghusen GC and Flommen GC. The Scandinavian Masters has typically been hosted at Barsebäck G&CC, with stints at Kungsängen GC, Forsgården GC and Arlandastad Golf, before a new rota of Bro Hof Slott GC, PGA Sweden National and Hills GC was established in 2010.

Albatross GC, Delsjö GC, Kristianstad GC, Österåker GC and almost a dozen other courses have hosted Ladies European Tour events, such as the Scandinavian TPC hosted by Annika which ran 1996–2008.

In addition, Swedish courses hosted over a hundred Challenge Tour events 1989–2020, and over 40 International Golf Federation or European Golf Association amateur events starting with the 1962 St Andrews Trophy at Halmstad GC. Also, Arlandastad Golf serves as European Tour Q-School first stage venue 2020–2027.

Key

Former venue
Current venue

Course	Organizer (Note: EUR − European Tour; LET − Ladies European Tour; SOLHEIM − Solheim Cup; SEN − European Senior Tour; CHA − Challenge Tour; IGF − International Golf Federation; EGA − European Golf Association.)					
Course	EUR	LET	SOLHEIM	SEN	CHA	IGF · EGA
Royal Drottningholm GC	1973 · 1976–1977; 1988–1990; 1991 · 1994	2003				1982 · 1988; 2007
Bokskogen GC	1974–1975; 1989–1990				2001	2003 · 2006
Vasatorp GC	1978–1980 · 2024	2002 · 2013–2015; 2024			1991 · 1993	2025
Linköping GC	1981–1982					2013
Ullna G&CC	1983–1987 · 2023	2004 · 2023				1988
Falsterbo GC	1986				2003	2009 · 2021
Ljunghusen GC	1987				1996–2000; 2002–2004	1977; 2001 · 2019
Flommen GC	1988					
Barsebäck Resort	1992 · 1995 · 1997 · 1999; 2001 · 2003–2004; 2006 · 2009 · 2017	1998 · 2000; 2005 · 2007	2003			2014 · 2014
Forsgården GC	1993 · 1996					2018
Kungsängen GC	1998 · 2000 · 2002 · 2005			2001		
Arlandastad Golf	2007–2008				2004–2005	
Bro Hof Slott GC	2010–2013 · 2016					
The National	2014–2015				2011	2017
Hills GC	2018–2019	2025			2008	
Vallda G&CC	2021	2021				
Halmstad GC	2022	1999–2000 · 2022	2007		1989–1992; 2002	1962 · 1986; 1969 · 2011; 1985 · 2015; 1997
Albatross GC		1980–1981			1989	
Mölle GC		1984–1985				
Delsjö GC		1985 · 1988				
Kristianstad GC		1986 · 2021			1999 · 2026	2002
Falun-Borlänge GC		1986				
Isaberg GC		1989				
Haninge GC		1990–1996				
Örebro GC		1996			1989 · 1993	
Österåker GC		1997 · 1999 · 2001			1994–1995; 2021–2022	2010
Sjögärde GC		1998				
Bro-Bålsta GC		2006			2001	
Frösåker GC		2008			1996	
Lycke G&CC		2008				
Skaftö GC		2021–2022				
Allerum GC		2023–2024			2022	2026
Fågelbro G&CC				1997–1998		
Stora Lundby GC					1989	
Rya GC					1989–1990; 1992 · 1994	1974
Karlstad GC					1989–1990	1996 · 2005
Upsala GC					1990 · 1994; 1991–1992; 2025	1999 · 2020
Söderåsen GC					1989–2001	
Tranås GC					1990–1992	
Ågesta GC					1989–1991	
Mariestad GC					1990–1991	
Gävle GC					1989–1991	
Kungsbacka GC					1989–1990	
Västerås GC					1989–1994 · 1996	
Viksjö GC					1991	
Kungälv-Kode GC					1992	
Östersund-Frösö GC					1994	
Skellefteå GC					1995	
Hook GC					1996	
Varberg GC					1997–1998	
Waxholm GC					2005–2007	
Båstad GC					2009–2010	1994 · 2007
Katrineholm GC					2016–2018	
Hinton GC					2021	
Askersund GC					2023 · 2027	
Landeryd GC					2023–2024	
Jönköping GC						1967
Lunds Akademiska GC					1989	1980
Lyckorna GC						1989
Stockholm GC						2000
Skövde GC						2004
Stenungsund GC						2008
Lidingö GC						2012
Tegelberga GC						2023
Göteborg GC						2024

== Courses by region and district ==
=== Skåneland ===
==== Blekinge ====
- Boa GC – Olofström
- Carlskrona GC
- Karlshamn GC
- Leråkra GC
- Nicklastorp GC
- Ronneby GC
- Sölvesborg GC
- Trummenäs GC

==== Halland ====
- Björnhult GC
- Falkenberg GC
- Flygstaden GC
- Halmstad GC – Tylösand
- Harabäcken GC
- Haverdal GC
- Hofgård GC
- Holm GC
- Klosterfjorden GC
- Laholm GC
- Ringenäs GC
- Rydö GC
- Skogaby GC
- Strandtorp GC
- Tönnersjö GC
- Ullared Flädje GC
- Varberg GC
- Vinberg GC

==== Skåne ====
- Abbekås GC
- Allerum GC
- Araslöv GC
- Barsebäck G&CC
- Båstad GC
- Bedinge GC
- Bjäre GC
- Björkenäs GC
- Bokskogen GC
- Bosjökloster GC
- Degeberga-Widtsköfle GC
- Elisefarm GC
- Eslöv GC
- Falsterbo GC
- Flommen GC
- Glumslöv GC
- Helsingborg GC
- Hinton GC
- Hässlegården GC
- Höganäs GC
- Kävlinge GC
- Kristianstad GC – Åhus
- Landskrona GC
- Ljungbyhed GC
- Ljunghusen GC
- Lunds Akademiska GC
- Lydinge GC
- Malmö Burlöv GC
- Mölle GC
- Naturligtvis G&CC – Assartorp
- Oxie GC
- Perstorp GC
- PGA Sweden National
- Romeleåsen GC
- Rya GC
- St Arild GC
- St Ibb GC
- Sjöbo GC
- Skepparslöv GC
- Skyrup GC
- Söderåsen GC
- Söderslätt GC
- Sönnertorp GC
- Tegelberga GC
- Tomelilla GC
- Torekov GC
- Trelleborg GC
- Vallgården GC – Åkarp
- Värpinge GC
- Vasatorp GC
- Vellinge GC
- Wegeholm GC
- Wittsjö GC
- Woodlands G&CC
- Ystad GC
- Åkagården GC
- Ängelholm GC
- Äppelgården GC
- Örestad GC
- Öresund GC – Häljarp
- Österlen GC
- Östra Göinge GC
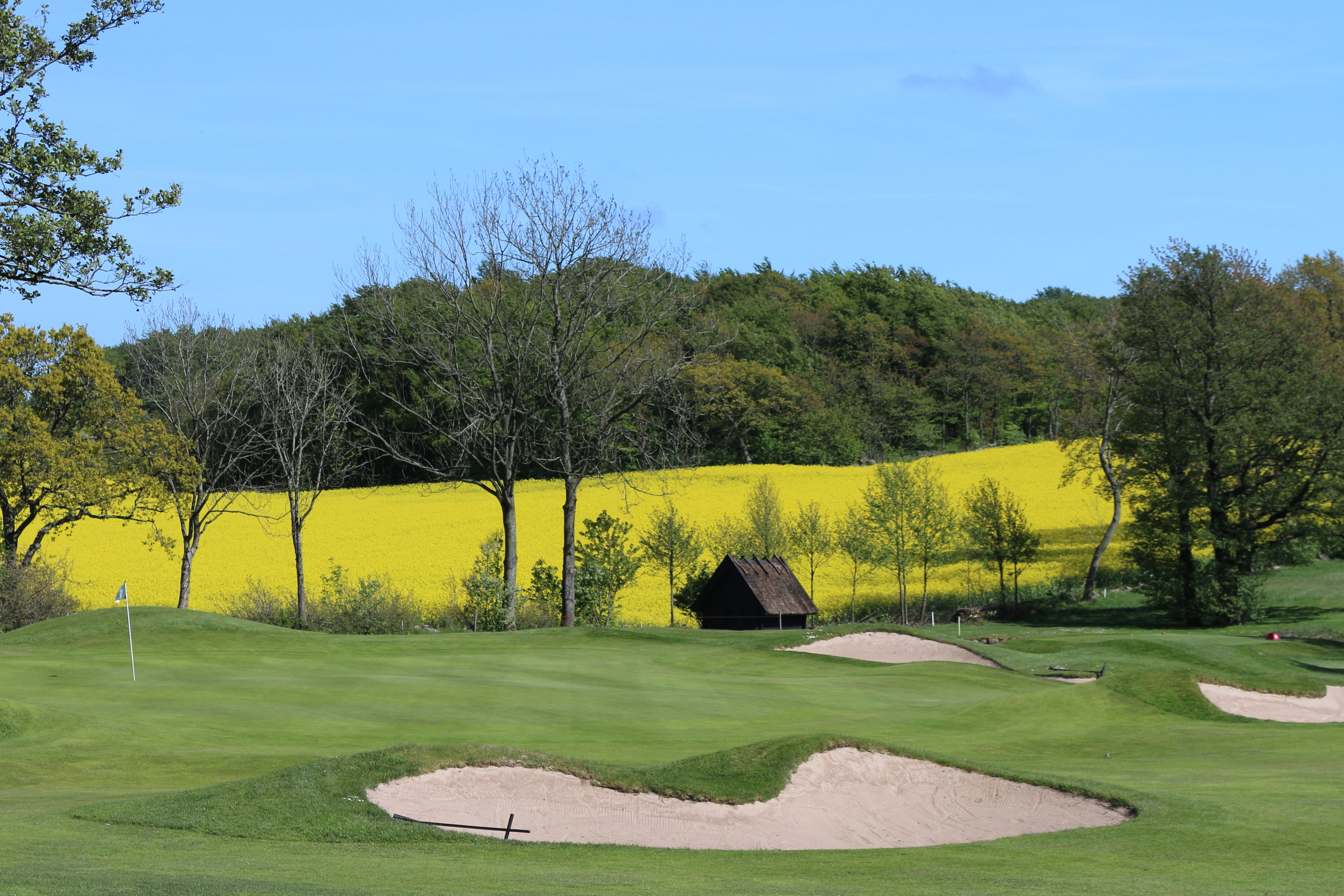
Båstad GC

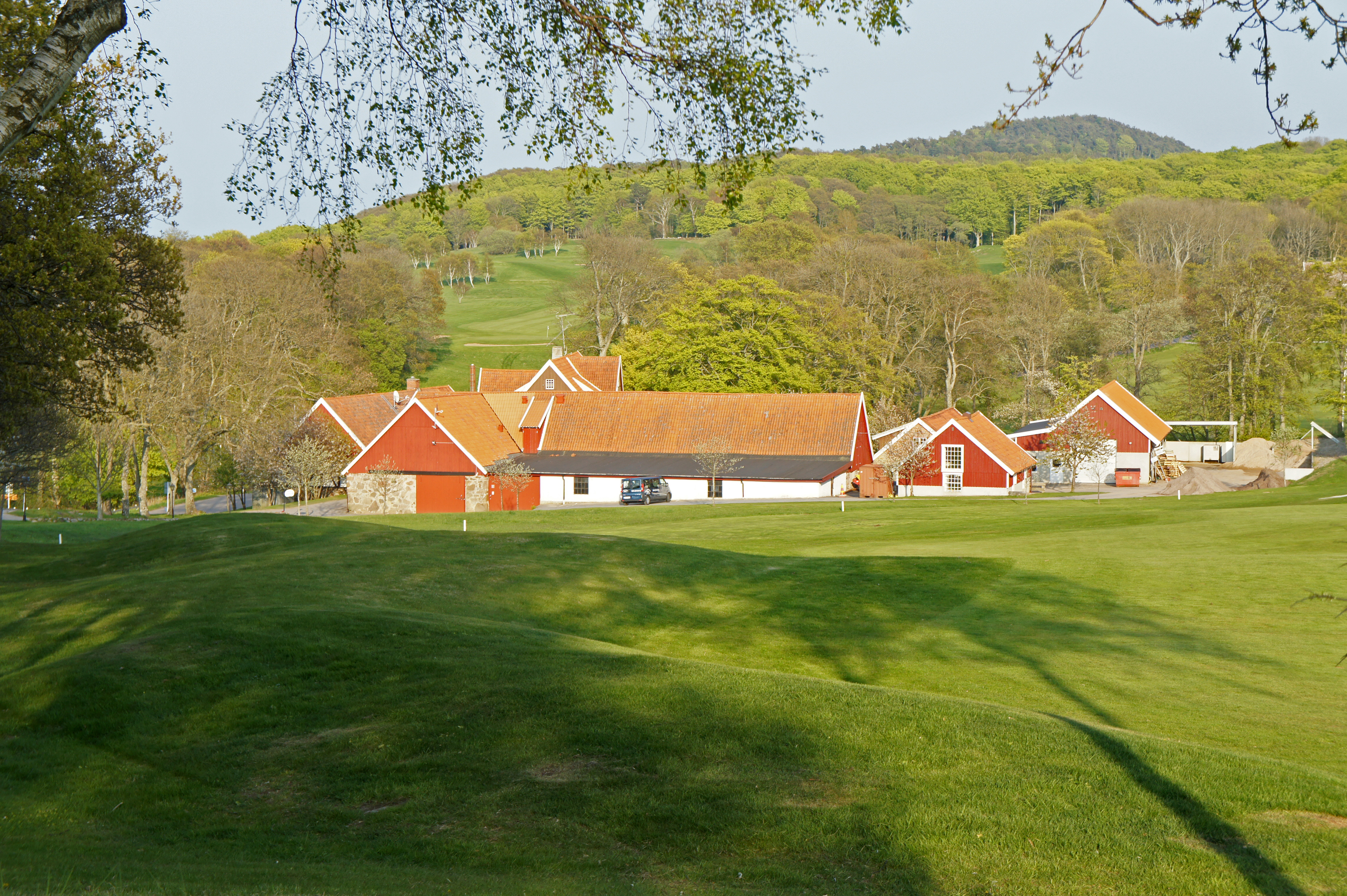
Mölle GC

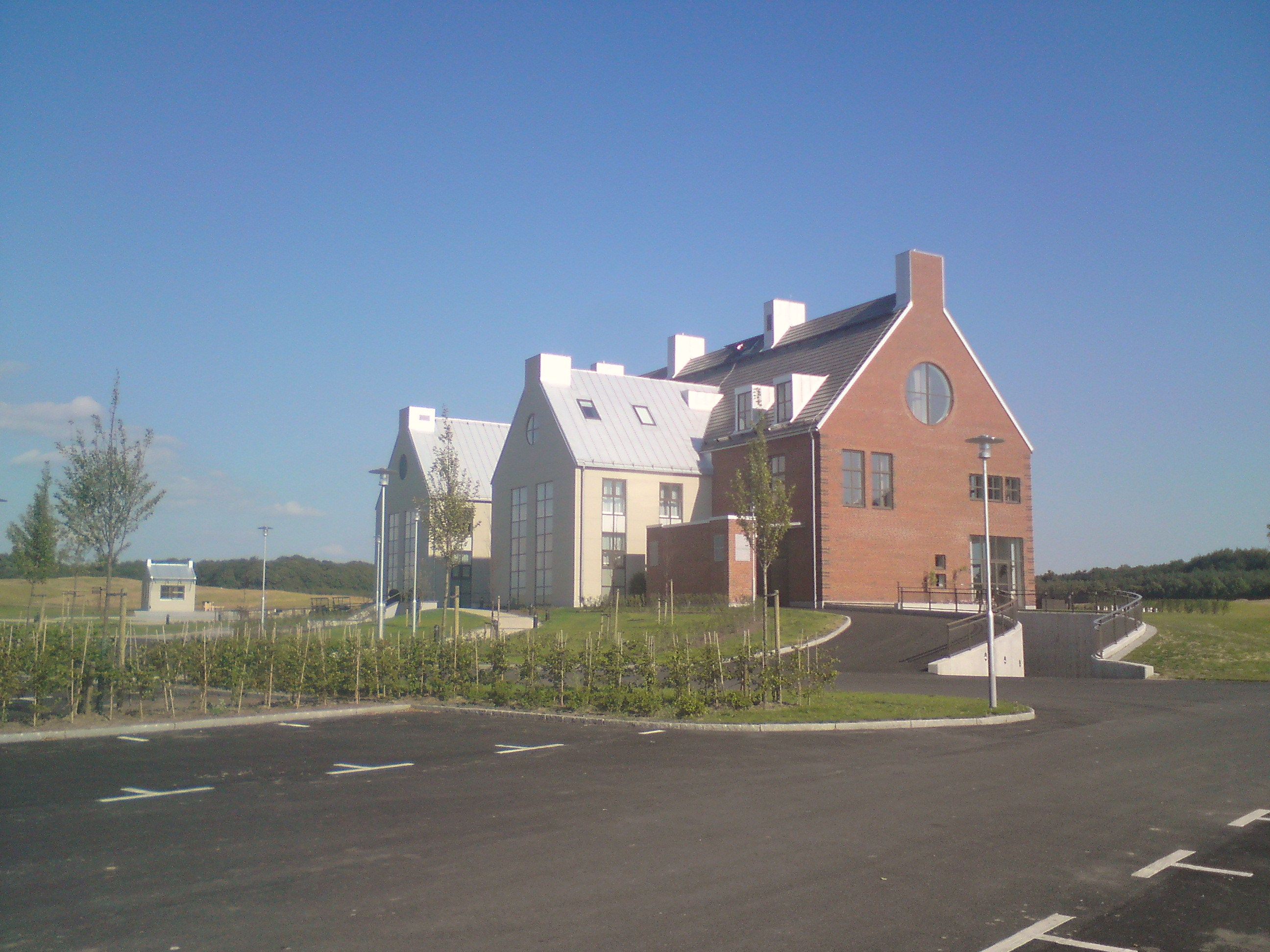
PGA Sweden National

=== Götaland ===
==== Bohuslän & Dalsland ====
- Allmag GC
- Brastad GC
- Dagsholm GC
- Dynekilen GC
- Fjällbacka GC
- Forsbacka GC
- Lyckorna GC
- Lysekil Holma GC
- Mellerud GC
- Mjölkeröd GC
- Norra Backa Golf Fjällbacka
- Orust GC
- Skaftö GC
- Sotenäs GC
- Stenungsund GC
- Strömstad GC
- Tjörn GC
- Torreby GC
- Uddevalla GC

==== Gotland ====
- Gotska GC
- Gumbalde GC
- Ljugarn GC
- När GC
- Slite GC
- Visby GC

==== Gothenburg ====
- Albatross GC
- Ale GC
- Backa Säteri GC
- Chalmers GC
- Delsjö GC
- Forsgården GC
- Gräppås GC
- Gullbringa G&CC
- Göteborg GC
- Hills GC
- Kungsbacka GC
- Kungälv-Kode GC
- Lerjedalens GC
- Lunna Golf
- Lycke G&CC – Marstrand
- Lysegården GC
- Lökeberg GC
- Myra GC
- Mölndal GC
- Partille GC
- St Jörgen Park GC
- Sisjö GC
- Sjögärde GC
- Stora Lundby GC
- Särö GC
- Torrekulla GC
- Torslanda GC
- Vallda G&CC
- Öijared GC

==== Småland ====
- A6 GC
- Alvesta GC
- Binga Golf
- Byxelkrok GC
- Böda Sand GC
- Ekerum GC
- Eksjö GC
- Emmaboda GC
- Figeholm G&CC
- Glasriket GC – Växjö
- Gränna GC
- Grönhögen Golf Links
- Götaström GC
- Hook GC
- Isaberg GC
- Jönköping GC
- Kalmar GC
- Lagan GC
- Lanna GC
- Loftahammar GC
- Lysingsbadet GC
- Mönsterås GC
- Möre GC
- Nybro GC
- Nässjö GC
- Oskarshamn GC
- Ramkvilla GC
- Reftele GC
- Rockatorp GC
- Ryfors GC
- Sand GC
- Saxnäs GC
- Skinnarebo G&CC
- Tobo GC
- Tranås GC
- Uppvidinge GC
- Vetlanda GC
- Vimmerby GC
- Visingsö GC
- Värnamo GC
- Västervik GC
- Växjö GC
- Wiredaholm GC
- Älmhult GC
- Öland GC

==== Västergötland ====
- Alingsås GC
- Billingen GC
- Borås GC
- Bredared GC
- Breviken GC
- Ekarnas GC
- Falköping GC
- Herrljunga GC
- Hulta-Bollebygd GC
- Hökensås GC
- Hörlycke GC
- Kind GC
- Knistad G&CC
- Koberg GC
- Lidköping GC
- Lundsbrunn GC
- Läckö GC
- Mariestad GC
- Mark GC
- Onsjö GC
- Ribbingsfors GC
- Skövde GC
- Töreboda GC
- Ulricehamn GC
- Vara-Bjertorp GC
- Vårgårda GC
- Åsundsholm GC

==== Östergötland ====
- Bråvikens GC
- Bryttsätter GC
- Finspång GC
- Flemminge GC
- Ingelsta GC
- Kinda GC
- Landeryd GC
- Linköping GC
- Mauritzbergs Slott GC
- Mjölby GC
- Motala GC
- Norrköping Söderköping GC
- Ombergs GC
- Vadstena GC
- Vårdsberg GC
- Vreta Kloster GC
- Waldemarsvik GC
- Åtvidaberg GC
- Östad GC – Väderstad
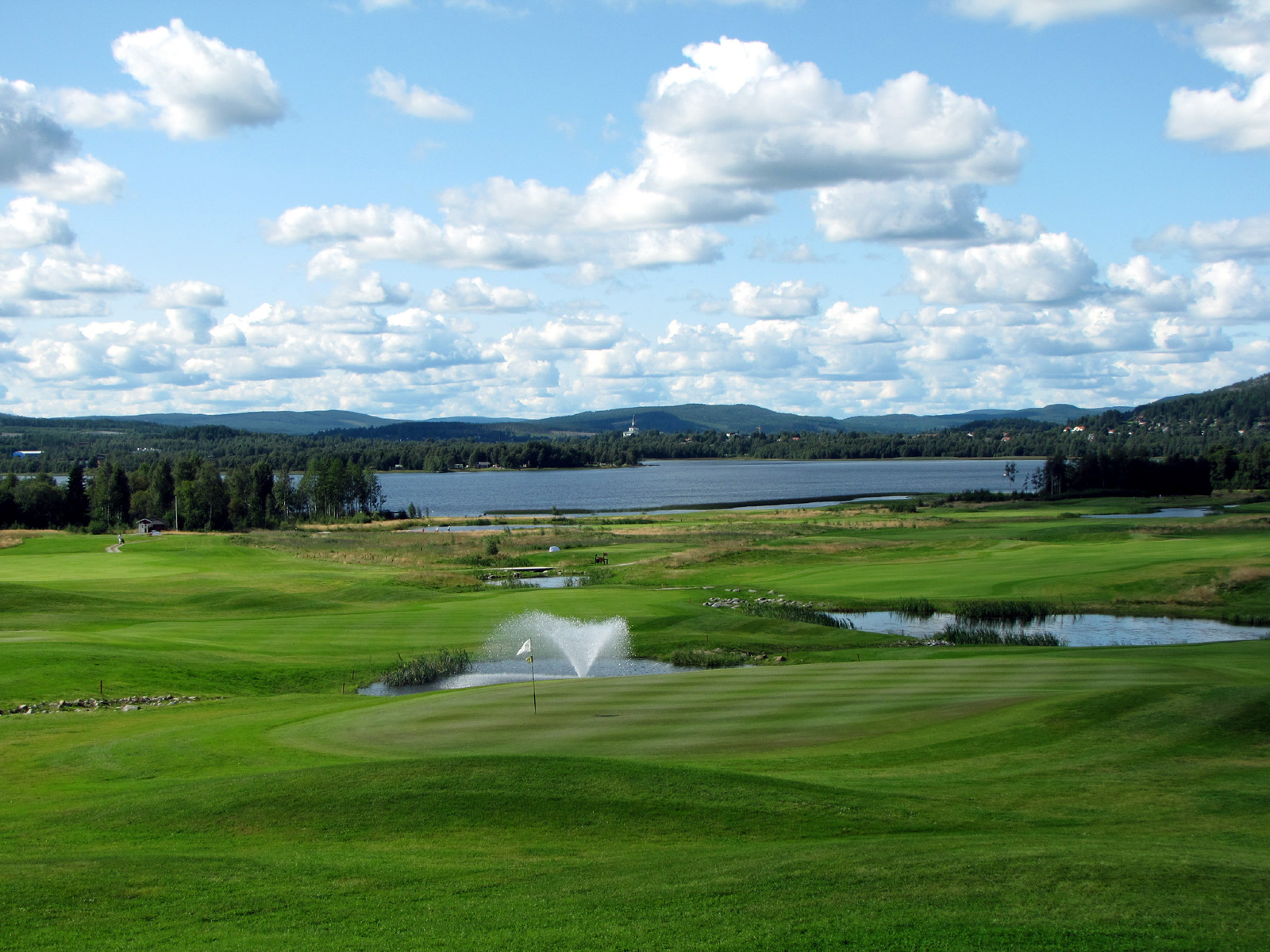
Veckefjärdens GC

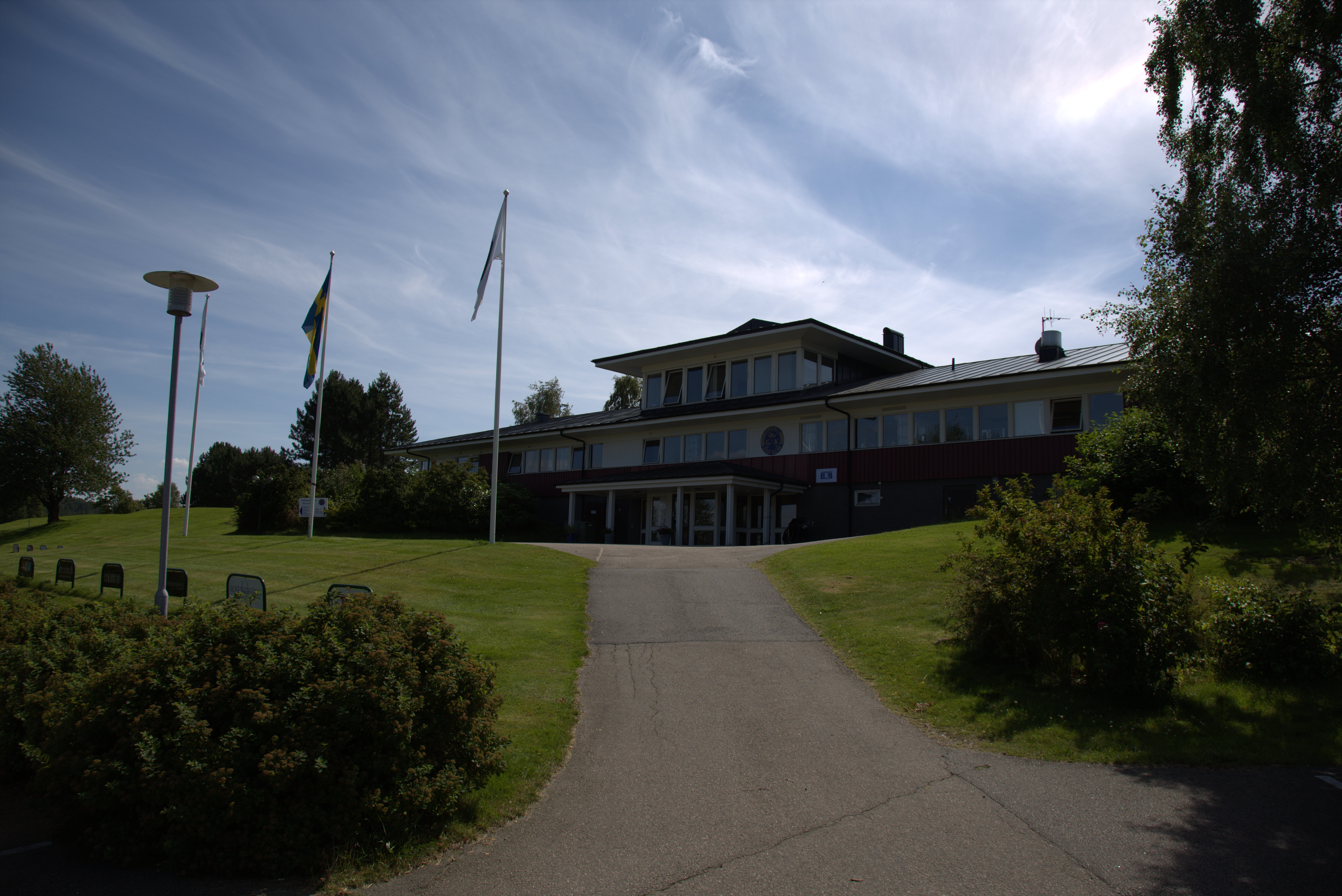
Varberg GC

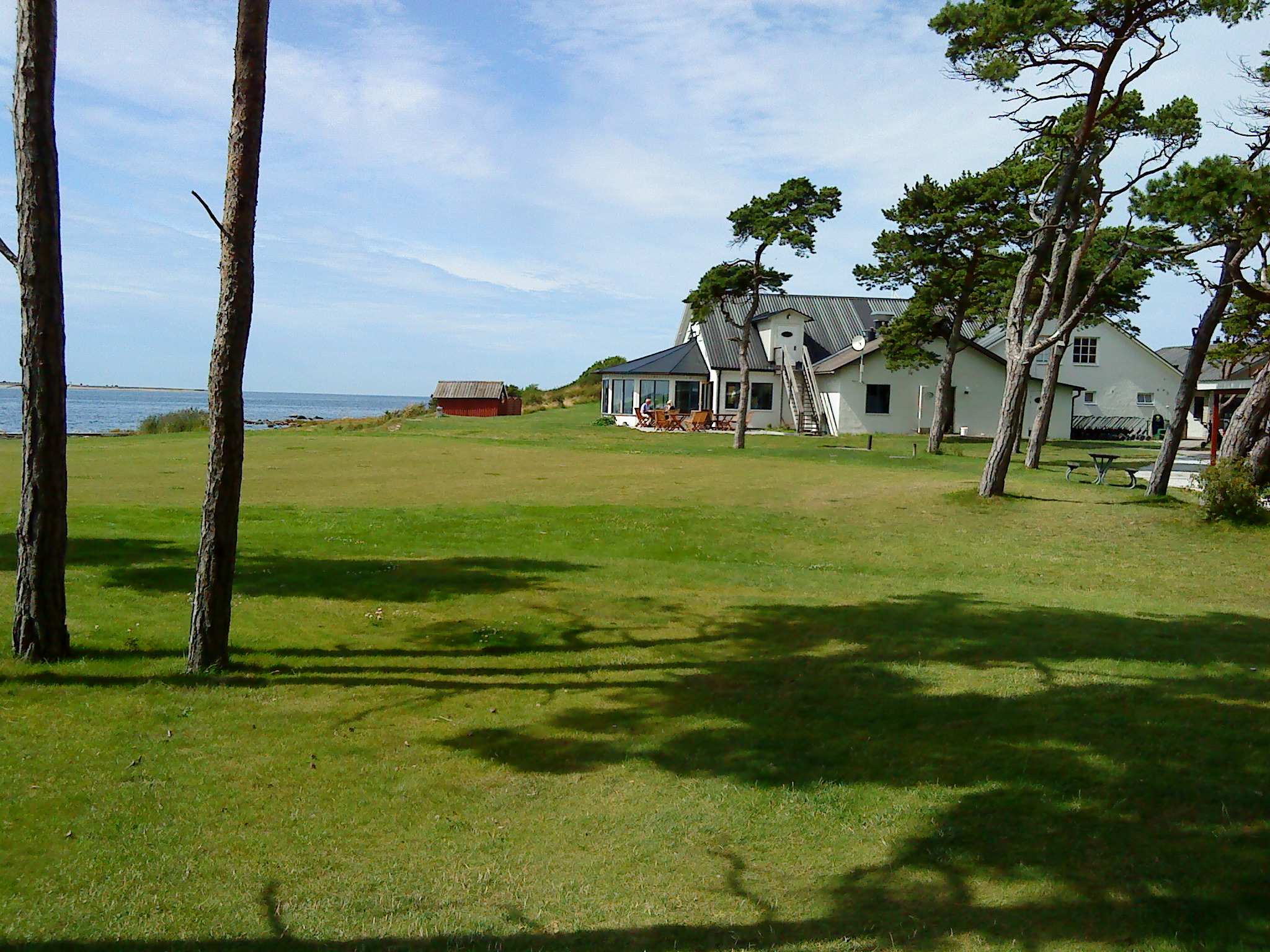
Visby GC

=== Svealand ===
==== Dalarna ====
- Avesta GC
- Dalsjö GC
- Falun-Borlänge GC
- Furudals-Bruk GC
- Gagnef GC
- Hagge GC
- Hedemora GC
- Idrefjällen GC
- Leksand GC
- Malungs GC
- Mora GC
- Rättvik GC
- Sälenfjällen GC
- Samuelsdal GC
- Säter GC
- Solön GC
- Snöå GC
- Tällbergsbyarna GC
- Älvdalen GC

==== Stockholm County ====
- AIK GC
- Arninge GC
- Björkhagen GC
- Björkliden GC
- Botkyrka GC
- Bro Hof Slott GC
- Bro-Bålsta GC
- Brollsta GC (Note: Operated by GolfStar)
- Danderyd GC
- Djurgården GC
- Djursholm GC
- Ekholmsnäs GC
- Fågelbro G&CC
- Fors GC
- Grindslanten GC
- Hagby GC
- Haninge GC
- HaningeStrand GC
- Hässelby GC
- Huddinge GC
- Husby GC – Österhaninge
- Huvudstaden GC
- Ingarö GC
- Järfälla GC
- Jarlabanke GC
- Kungsängen GC
- Kyssinge GC
- Lidingö GC
- Lindö GC
- Ljusterö GC
- Mälarö GC – Skytteholm
- Nacka GC
- Norråva GC
- Nynäshamn GC
- Riksten GC
- Royal Drottningholm GC
- Salem GC
- Saltsjöbaden GC
- Smådalarö Gård
- Sofielund GC
- Sollentuna GC
- Stockholm GC
- Täby GC
- Tjusta Golf
- Troxhammar GC
- Tyresö Golf
- Ullna GC
- Ulriksdal GC
- Vallentuna GC
- Viksjö GC
- Wäsby GC
- Waxholm GC
- Wermdö G&CC
- Ågesta GC
- Åkersberga GC
- Österåker GC
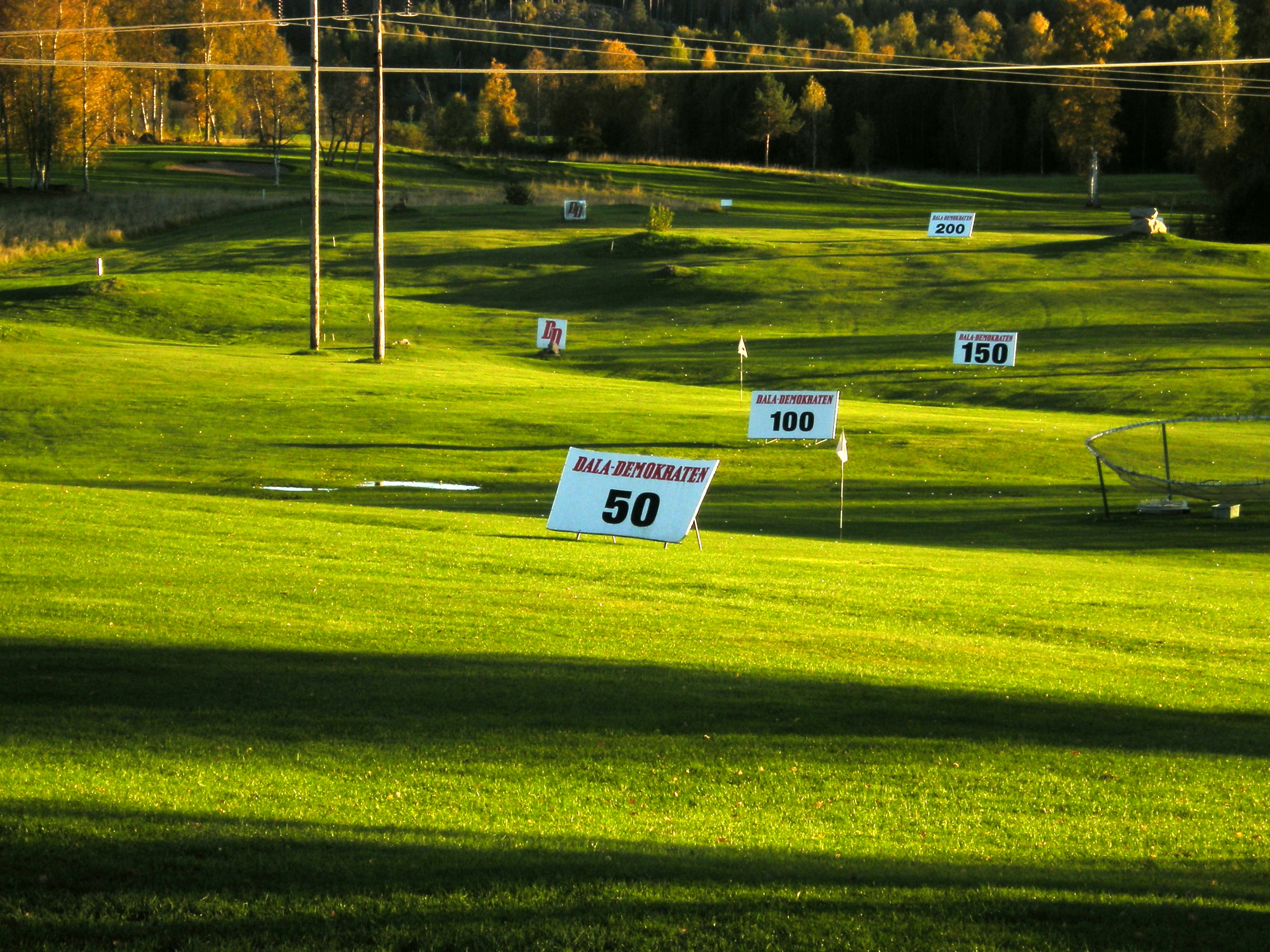
Aspeboda GC

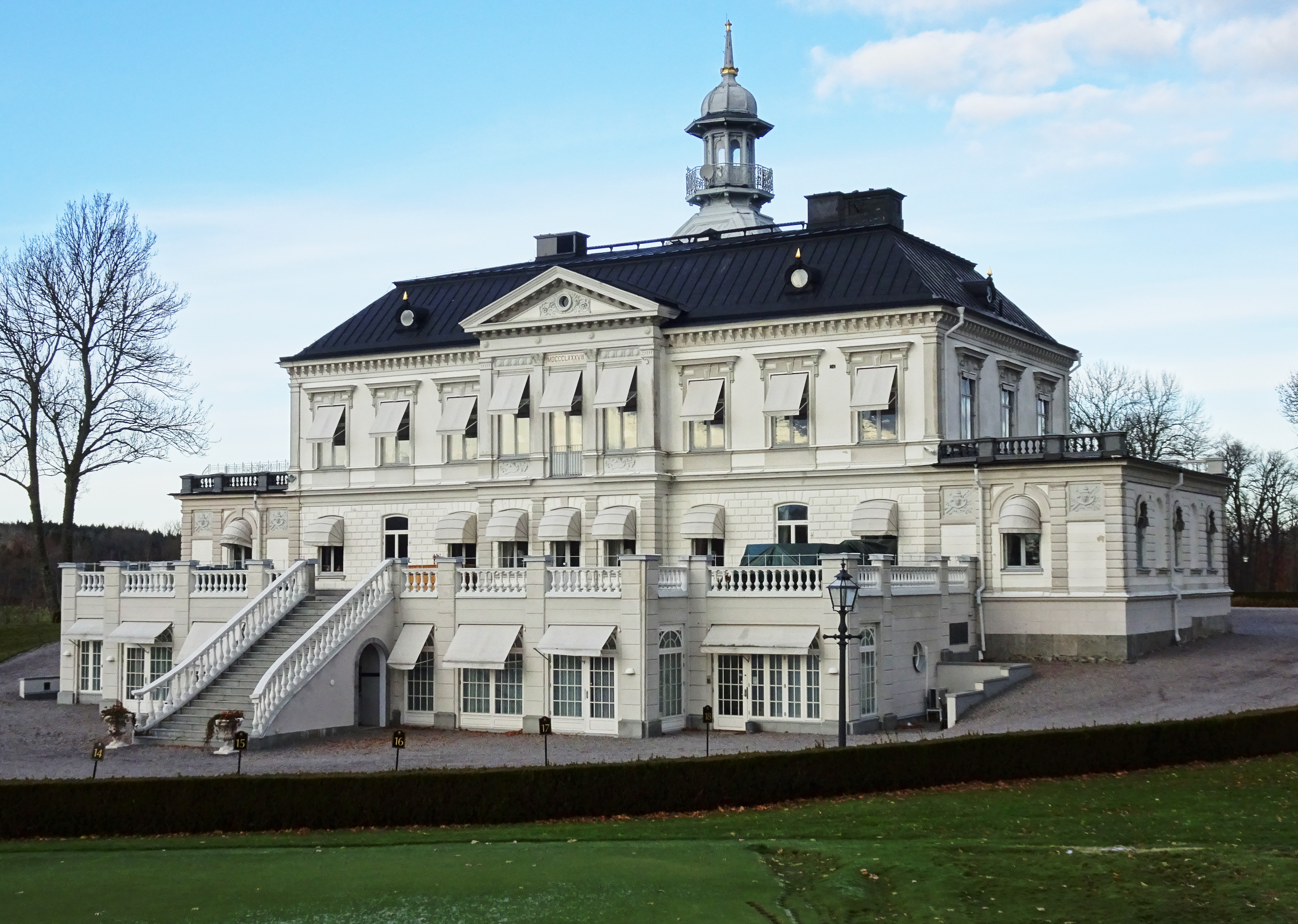
Bro Hof Slott GC

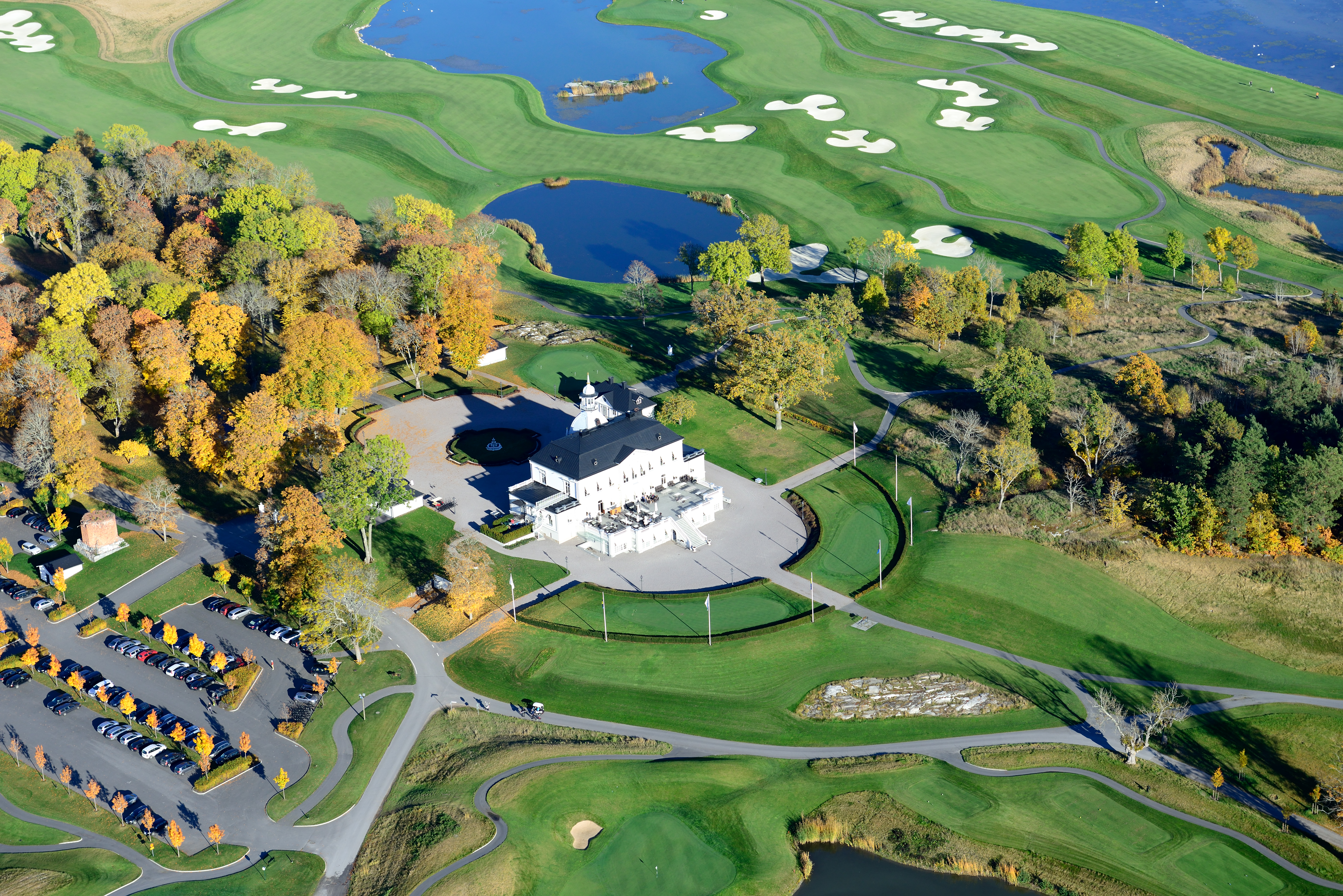
Bro Hof Slott GC

==== Södermanland ====
- Eskilstuna GC
- Flen GC
- Fogdö GC
- Gripsholm GC – Mariefred
- Grytsberg GC
- Jönåker GC
- Kallfors GC
- Katrineholm GC
- Kiladalen GC
- Mälarbaden GC
- Nyköping GC
- Norrby Golf
- Skälby Golf
- Strand GC
- Strängnäs GC
- Sundbyvik GC
- Södertälje Park GC
- Torshälla GC
- Trosa GC
- Vidbynäs GC
- Viksberg GC
- Vingåker GC
- Åda G&CC

==== Uppland ====
- Arlandastad Golf
- Bodaholm GC
- Burvik GC
- Enköping GC
- Friibergh GC
- Grönlund GC
- Hallstavik GC
- International GC – Arlanda
- Johannesberg GC
- Kåbo GC
- Olandsbygden GC
- Roslagen GC – Norrtälje
- Sigtuna GC
- Skepptuna GC
- Sparren GC – Lisinge
- Sundsta GC – Norrtälje
- Upsala GC
- Väddö GC
- Vassunda GC
- Wattholma GC
- Älvkarleby GC
- Örbyhus GC
- Öregrund GC

==== Värmland ====
- Årjäng GC
- Arvika GC
- Billerud GC
- Bryngfjorden GC
- Eda GC
- Forshaga-Deje GC
- Hammarö GC
- Karlstad GC
- Kil GC
- Kristinehamn GC
- Lundsberg GC
- Saxå GC
- Sommarro GC
- Sunne GC
- Torsby GC
- Uddeholm GC

==== Västmanland ====
- Arboga GC
- Fagersta GC
- Frösåker GC – Västerås
- Fullerö GC
- Hälla GC
- Köping GC
- Orresta GC
- Sala-Heby GC
- Skerike GC
- Strömsholm GC
- Surahammar GC
- Tortuna GC
- Västerås GC
- Ängsö GC

==== Örebro County ====
- Askersund GC
- Degerfors GC
- Karlskoga GC
- Kårsta GC
- Kumla GC
- Lannalodge GC
- Lindesberg GC
- Nora GC
- Stjernfors GC
- Örebro City G&CC
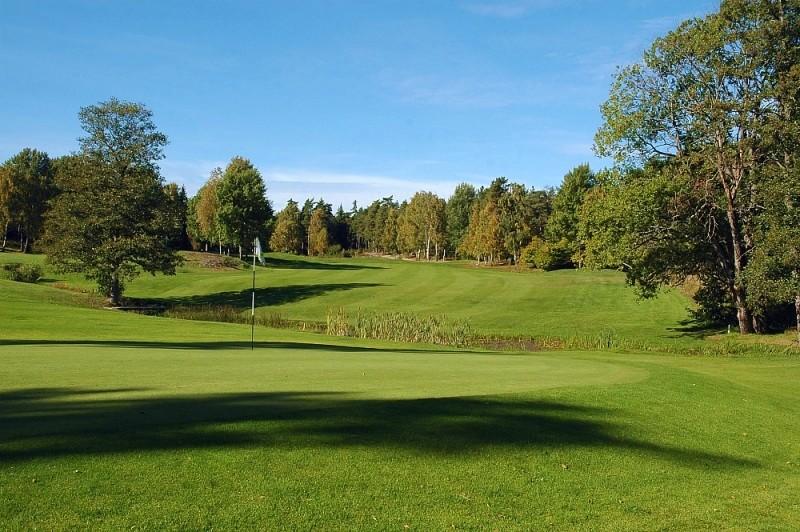
Björkhagen GC

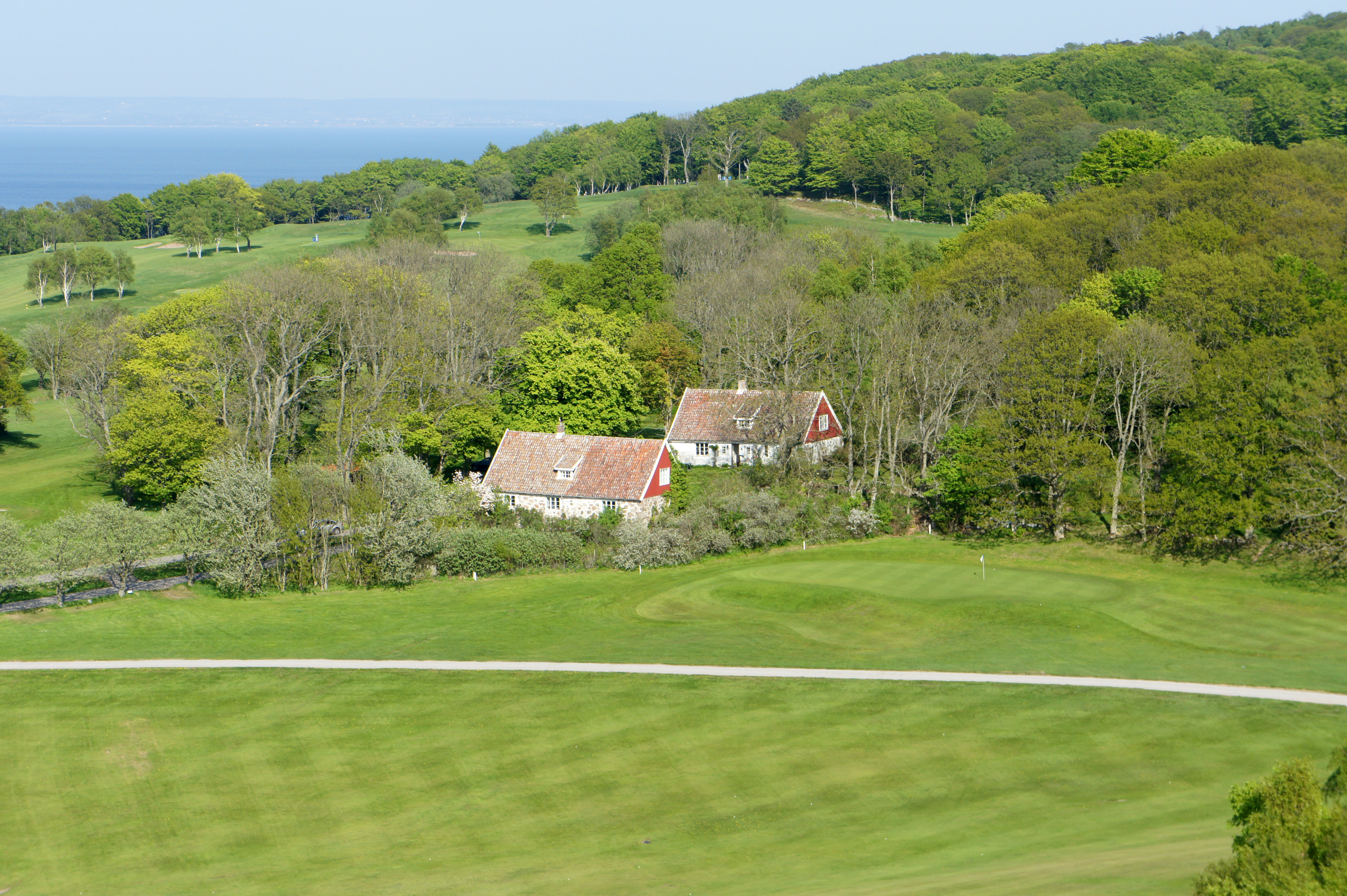
Mölle GC

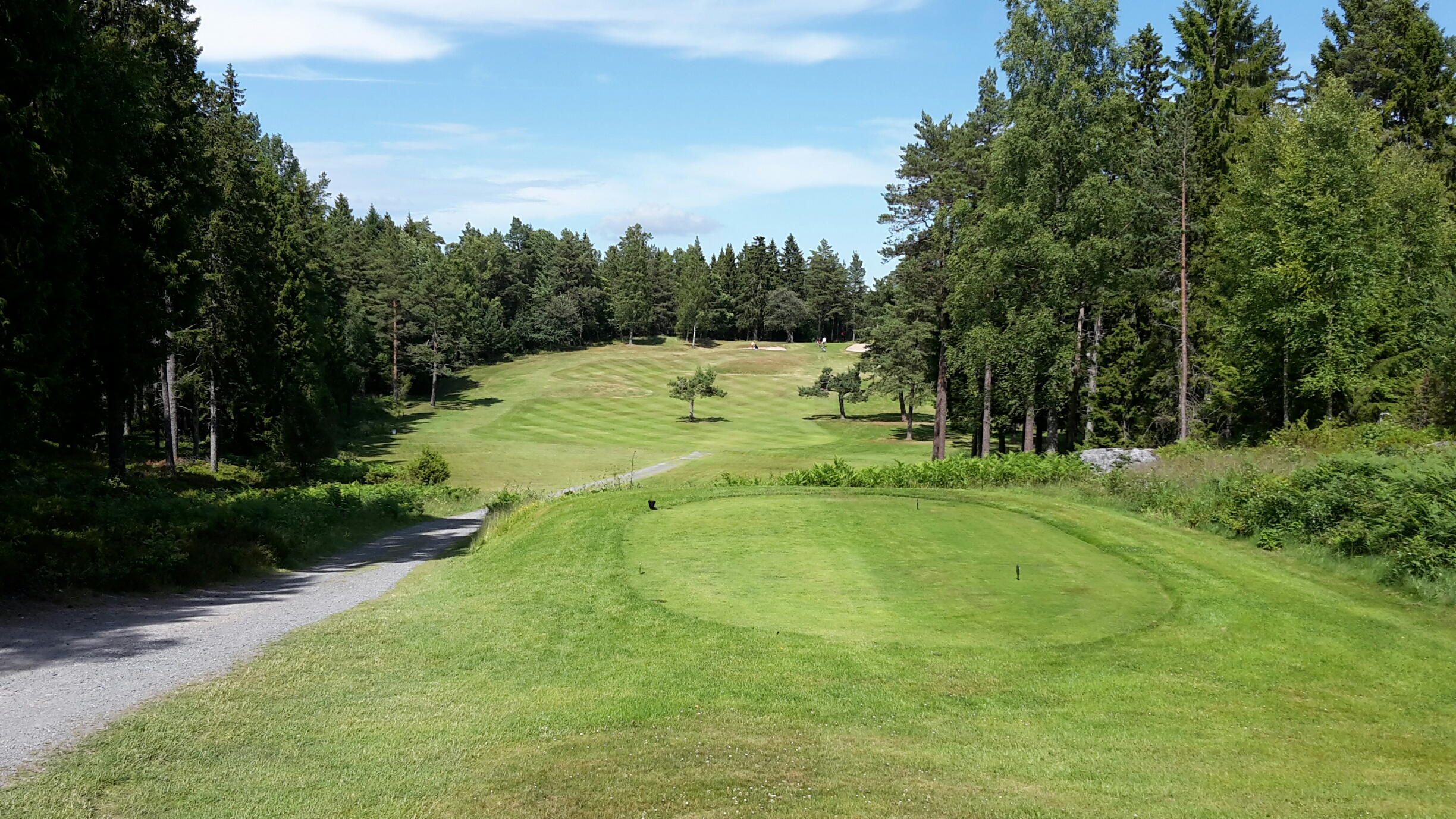
Roslagen GC

=== Norrland ===
==== Gästrikland & Hälsingland ====
- Alfta-Edsbyn GC
- Bollnäs GC
- Gävle GC
- Hasselabygden GC
- Hofors GC
- Hudiksvall GC
- Högbo GC
- Järvsöbaden GC
- Ljusdal GC
- Mackmyra Golf
- SAIK GC
- Söderhamn GC
- Sörfjärden GC

==== Jämtland & Härjedalen ====
- Åre GC
- Funäsfjällen GC
- Hede-Vemdalen GC
- Klövsjö-Vemdalen GC
- Norderön GC
- Östersund-Frösö GC
- Rossön GC
- Sandnäset GC
- Storsjöbygden GC
- Strömsund GC
- Sveg GC

==== Medelpad ====
- Hussborg GC
- Öjestrand GC
- Sundsvall GC
- Timrå GC

==== Norrbotten & Västerbotten ====
- Arvidsjaur GC
- Bjurholm GC
- Boden GC
- Boliden GC
- Granöbygden GC
- Gunnarns GC
- Gällivare-Malmberget GC
- Haparanda GC
- Kalix GC
- Kiruna GC
- Luleå GC
- Lycksele GC
- Norrmjöle GC
- Norsjö GC
- Piteå GC
- Porjus GC
- Robertsfors GC
- Skellefteå GC
- Tureholms Nya GC
- Umeå GC
- Umeå Sörfors GC
- Åsele Nya GC

==== Ångermanland ====
- Härnösand GC
- Norrfällsviken GC
- Sollefteå GC
- Veckefjärden GC
- Örnsköldsvik GC
