= Hudiksvall Golf Club =

Golf club in Hudiksvall, Sweden

Coordinates: 61°40′N 17°10′E

- Location in Gävleborg County, Sweden Hudiksvall GC (Sweden)

Club information
- Location: Idenor, Hudiksvall Municipality, Hälsingland, Gävleborg County, Sweden
- Established: 1964; 1964 (SGF Member); 1965 (9 holes opened); 1974 (14 holes opened); 1989 (18 holes opened)
- Type: Private
- Total holes: 18
- Website: hudiksvallsgk.se

18 holes
- Designed by: Nils Sköld; Sune Linde
- Par: 71
- Length: 5,545 m

Hudiksvall Golf Club is a golf club located in Hudiksvall Municipality, 4 km south of Hudiksvall city center, in Sweden.

== History ==
=== Foundation and development ===
Initiator to the official foundation of the club on 19 May 1964 was Dr. Sten Brattström (1916–1965). The club was elected member of the Swedish Golf Federation on 23 October 1964 as its 86th member club. Shortly thereafter, Brattsröm passed away, at 48 years of age, and Johnnie Dahlström became chairman of the club.

The first club competitions, including the first club championships, were held in 1966. At this time the number of members was around 200.

The course was built on agricultural land and an agricultural building was used as its first club house, but without any restaurant facilities.

When Gudrun Noréen Falk was elected chairperson of the club in 1977, she became the first female chairperson in history in a Swedish golfclub.

Gunnar Larsson held the position as chairperson of the club during two periods of time of totally 19 years. During this time, two major extensions of the course took place. In 1990 Larsson received the Silver Plaque of the Swedish Golf Federation for contributions to the sport of golf in Sweden.

The number of members in the club were less than 300 through the 1970s. 20 years later, at the time when an 18-hole-course was ready for play, the number increased in one year from 750 to 1,450 club members. The following years, the number of members continued to be more than 1,000.

In 2020 a new club house was built. In 2023 an indoor golfstudio with digital measuring equipment was inaugurated and in 2026, Hudiksvall Golf Club became the first golf club in the province of Hälsningland with launch monitors available on the driving range tees.

=== Chairpersons ===
1964	Sten Brattsröm
1965–1966	Johnnie Dahlström
1967–1976	Gunnar Larsson
1977–1979	Gudrun Noréen Falk
1980–1988	Gunnar Larson
1989–1991	Lars Berg
1992–1997	Bernt Jonsson
1998–2000	Roger Nordqvist
2001–2008	Leif Johansson
2009–2015	Ulf Åhlin
2016–2019	Nils-Erik Blomdahl
2020–	K-G Larsgården

=== Head professionals ===
1965	Ronald Afleck
1966	Paul Botell
1967–1975	Edward Jenkins
1976	Jimmy Eriksson
1977–1978	Kjell Finnmo
1979–1980	Mats B. Larsson
1981–1982	Magnus Andersson
1983	Per Nellbeck
1984	–
1985–1987	Lars Tingvall
1988–1989	Mats B. Larsson

Edward Jenkins, head pro 1967–1975, driving from the first tee at Hudiksvall Golf Club, with the old clubhouse in the background, in 1971

1990	Magnus Falk
1991–1993	Lars Tingvall
1994–1997	Johan Tärnström
1998	Peter Grimfjord
1999	Mårten Wernersson
2000–2007	Jon Sellén
2008–2009	Tommy Björnsson
2010–2014	Filip Modig
2015–2022	Jon Sellén
2023–2024	Alexander Sandelin
2025–	Johan Tärnström

== The course ==
The first nine-hole-stretch, designed by Swedish golf course architect Nils Sköld, was ready for play during 1965. The course, with par 35, consisted of six par-4-holes, two par-3-holes and one par-5-hole. In 1972, the par 3 seventh hole, close to the car parking area near the club house, was closed. Instead a new short par-3-hole, which came to be hole number eight, was built in the woods between the old eighth and ninth holes. With this change, the old seventh green became the first practice green at the club.

Former third green at Hudiksvall GC, transformed in 1989 to a chipping practice green, with second hole green, club house and driving range in the background

Five new holes, designed by Nils Sköld, were built in 1973 and opened for play in 1974. The new holes came to be number 6, 7, 8, 9 and 10 on the new 14-hole-course. For each 18-hole-round, holes 1–4 were played twice, but from different tees when used as holes 15–18.

Course architect Nils Sköld passed away in 1983 and golf course architect Sune Linde replaced him to designe five new holes. In 1989, an 18-hole-course was ready for play, since the new holes were added. At the same time, the old par 3 third hole was deleted from the course and its green, situated close to the driving range, was transformed to a practice green for chipping and pitching.

The course varies between holes in a flat park landscape and holes trough the woods.

=== Scorecard ===
Hole	1	2	3	4	5	6	7	8	9	Out	10	11	12	13	14	15	16	17	18	In	Total
Meters	323	395	258	327	475	315	190	138	142	2,743	360	278	501	140	320	470	260	165	308	2,802	5,545
Par	4	4	4	4	5	4	3	4	3	35	4	4	5	3	4	5	4	3	4	36	71

Lenghts from diffent tees:^{1}

- 56: 5,545 meters
- 53: 5,334 meters
- 49: 4,915 meters
- 45: 4,504 meters
- 42: 4,116 meters

Note:
* ^{1} Different tees are neither named as mens/ladies nor in colors, but in hectometers.

== Tournaments hosted ==
=== Amateur tournaments ===
Year	Men (M) / Women (W)	Tournament	Winner	Ref.
1989	M	Nordic Amateur Championship	(Sweden) Per-Ulrik Johansson	
1989	W	Nordic Amateur Championship	(Denmark) Katarina Örum	
1994	M	Swedish Junior Matchplay Championship	(Sweden) Jimmy Kawalec	
1994	W	Swedish Junior Matchplay Championship	(Sweden) Maria Hjort	

== See also ==
- List of golf courses in Sweden
