= Österåker Golf Club =

Swedish golf club in Åkersberga

- Location in Sweden
- 59.4913°N 18.254°E

Club information
- Location: Åkersberga, Stockholm County, Sweden
- Established: 1988 (SGF Member)
- Type: Private
- Tota holes: 36
- Tournaments: Compaq Open
- Website: ostgk.se

Västerled
- Designed by: Sven Tumba/Jan Sederholm (1988); Henrik Stenson/Christian Lundin (2022)
- Par: 72

Öster by Stenon
- Designed by: Sven Tumba/Jan Sederholm (1988); Henrik Stenson/Christian Lundin (2018)
- Par: 72

Österåker Golf Club (Österåkers Golfklubb) is a golf club situated in Åkersberga 20 km northeast of Stockholm, Sweden. It has hosted the Compaq Open on the Ladies European Tour.

== History ==
Opened in 1988 and co-designed by Sven Tumba and Jan Sederholm, the club was one of few in Sweden ambitious enough to build 36 holes at the outset. It hosted national and international tournaments throughout the 1990s.

By 2015 the club worried it could not keep pace with the new championship courses built in the Stockholm metropolitan area. In 2016 it sold a parcel of land to real estate developers, which enabled it to invest $25 million in a major revamp of the facilities. Henrik Stenson Golf Design was commissioned to create one of the finest golfing facilities in Scandinavia, drawing on inspiration from Le Nationale and TPC Sawgrass.

Construction of the new East course begun in 2016 and was completed in 2018, now renamed Öster by Stenson. The West course will open after remodeling in 2022. Following the revamp Svensk Golf, official publication of the Swedish Golf Federation, in 2020 ranked the Öster by Stenson course #8 in Sweden using the Golf Digest methodology.

The most notable player representing the club is PGA Tour winner Richard S. Johnson.

The club hosted the Ladies European Tour event Compaq Open on three occasions, featuring the biggest European stars of the day with winners such as Annika Sörenstam and Laura Davies. The European Amateur Team Championship was held here in 2010, which saw Tommy Fleetwood lead England to victory over a Swedish team with David Lingmerth and Henrik Norlander.

== Tournaments hosted ==
| Year | Tour | Championship | Winner |
|---|---|---|---|
| 1994 | CHA | Compaq Open – Swedish PGA Championship | (Sweden) Adam Mednick |
| 1995 | CHA | Compaq Open – Swedish PGA Championship | (Sweden) Dennis Edlund |
| 1997 | LET | Compaq Open | (Sweden) Annika Sörenstam |
| 1999 | LET | Compaq Open | (England) Laura Davies |
| 2001 | LET | Compaq Open | (Spain) Raquel Carriedo |
| 2021 | CHA | Dormy Open | (France) Félix Mory |

=== Amateur ===
- European Amateur Team Championship – 2010

== See also ==
- List of golf courses in Sweden
