= Barsebäck Golf & Country Club =

Golf club in Barsebäck, Sweden

Barsebäck Resort
- Location in Sweden
- 55.795°N 12.949°E

Club information
- Location: Barsebäck, Scania, Sweden
- Established: 1969
- Type: Public
- Owner: Ernst Rosén AB
- Total holes: 45
- Tournaments: Scandinavian Masters
- Website: barseback.com

Ocean Course
- Designed by: Ture Bruce
- Par: 73

Pine Course
- Designed by: Donald Steel
- Par: 71

Barsebäck Resort is a golf club in Barsebäck, northern part of Metropolitan Malmö in Scania, Sweden. The club is one of the premier golf facilities in Sweden and hosted the 2003 Solheim Cup and the Scandinavian Masters ten times between 1992 and 2017.

== History ==
The club, overlooking the Öresund strait, was founded in 1969 on the grounds of Barsebäck Castle by count Ian Hamilton and his wife Marianne. It was purchased in 1974 by Gösta Carlsson who developed the facility into one of the top golfing facilities in Sweden.

The club has two 18-hole courses, the 73-par Ocean Course (formerly Masters Course) finished in 1969 and designed by Ture Bruce, and the 71-par Pine Course (formerly Donald Steel Course) finished in 1989 and designed by Donald Steel, as well as a 9-hole course, Litorina.

In 2007, Annika Sörenstam hosted a Ladies European Tour competition named Scandinavian TPC hosted by Annika, played on the Masters Course August 9–12. The club first hosted the Scandinavian Masters in 1992. At the tenth installment in 2017 as many as 86,100 visitors saw 20-year-old Renato Paratore win the tournament.

A number of successful golfer have represented the club, including Louise Stahle, Caroline Hedwall and Henrik Stenson. The bag Stenson used when he won both the FedEx Cup Playoffs and the Race to Dubai in 2013 is on display in a glass case in the clubhouse.

In 2019, a 28 years old greenkeeper died after driving his lawn mower into a water hazard.

Gösta Carlsson died in 2018 at the age of 99. In 2020 his descendants sold the facility to Ernst Rosén, owner and operator of Vallda Golf & Country Club.

The resort (renovated 2022) includes a 36 room hotel, 28 houses for golfers and a restaurant under Michelin Guide awarded chef Karim Khouani.

== Tournaments hosted ==
=== Professional tournaments ===
Year	Tour	Championship	Winner
1992	EUR	Scandinavian Masters	(England) Nick Faldo
1995	EUR	Volvo Scandinavian Masters	(Sweden) Jesper Parnevik
1997	EUR	Volvo Scandinavian Masters	(Sweden) Joakim Haeggman
1998	LET	Compaq Open	(Sweden) Annika Sörenstam
1999	EUR	Volvo Scandinavian Masters	(Scotland) Colin Montgomerie
2000	LET	Compaq Open	(United States) Juli Inkster
2001	EUR	Volvo Scandinavian Masters	(Scotland) Colin Montgomerie
2003	EUR	Scandic Carlsberg Scandinavian Masters	(Australia) Adam Scott
2003	LET · LPGA	2003 Solheim Cup	Europe
2004	EUR	Scandinavian Masters by Carlsberg	(England) Luke Donald
2005	LET	Scandinavian TPC hosted by Annika	(Sweden) Annika Sörenstam
2006	EUR	EnterCard Scandinavian Masters	(Scotland) Marc Warren
2007	LET	Scandinavian TPC hosted by Annika	(Scotland) Catriona Matthew
2009	EUR	SAS Masters	(Argentina) Ricardo González
2017	EUR	Nordea Masters	(Italy) Renato Paratore

=== Amateur tournaments ===
Year	Organizer	Championship	Winner
2014	EGA	St Andrews Trophy	(United Kingdom) Great Britain & (Republic of Ireland) Ireland
2014	EGA	Jacques Léglise Trophy	(United Kingdom) Great Britain & (Republic of Ireland) Ireland

== See also ==
- List of golf courses in Sweden
