= Linköping Golf Club =

Golf club in Linköping, Sweden

Coordinates: 58.40155°N 15.5699°E

- Location in Sweden

Club information
- Location: Linköping, Östergötland County, Sweden
- Established: 1948 (SGF Member)
- Type: Private
- Total holes: 18
- Tournaments: Scandinavian Enterprise Open; SM Match Play
- Website: linkopingsgk.se

Course
- Designed by: Rafael Sundblom; Douglas Braiser
- Par: 72
- Course record: Men: 65 – (Spain) Antonio Garrido

Linköping Golf Club is a golf club located 3 km west of central Linköping in Östergötland County, Sweden. It has hosted the Scandinavian Enterprise Open on the European Tour.

== History ==
The club was admitted to the Swedish Golf Federation in 1948 and the course was inaugurated by Prince Bertil, Duke of Halland in 1949, after construction of the first 9 holes had started in 1945. The full 18 hole course, designed by Rafael Sundblom and Douglas Brasier, was completed in 1956. Peter Fjällman and Pierre Fulke has since modernized elements of the course.

Amongst the most successful players to come out of the club's youth system are Gisela Linnér, Claes Jöhncke and Krister Kinell.

The club has hosted the Scandinavian Enterprise Open on the European Tour twice. In 1980 when Seve Ballesteros won ahead of Nick Faldo and Bernhard Langer, and in 1981 when Bob Byman won ahead of Sam Torrance. It has also hosted many amateur tournaments such as the 1962 and 1969 Swedish Matchplay Championship, the 2012 Annika Invitational Europe won by Linnea Ström, and the 2013 European Girls' Team Championship, where the Swedish team successfully defended their title.

== Tournaments hosted ==
=== Professional tournaments ===
Year	Championship	Winner
1981	Scandinavian Enterprise Open	(Spain) Seve Ballesteros
1982	Scandinavian Enterprise Open	(United States) Bob Byman
1987	SM Match Trygg-Hansa Cup	(Sweden) Carl-Magnus Strömberg

=== Amateur tournaments ===
- Swedish Matchplay Championship – 1962 · 1969
- Annika Invitational Europe – 2012
- European Girls' Team Championship – 2013

== See also ==
- List of golf courses in Sweden
