= Forsgården Golf Club =

Golf club in Kungsbacka, Sweden

Coordinates: 57.4947°N 12.0987°E

- Location in Sweden

Club information
- Location: Kungsbacka Municipality, Halland County, Sweden
- Established: 1986 (SGF Member)
- Type: Private
- Total holes: 27
- Tournaments: Scandinavian Masters
- Website: forsgarden.se

Masters Course
- Designed by: Sune Linde; Peter Chamberlain
- Par: 72
- Course record: Men: 65, Steven Bottomley (1996); Women: 65, Alessia Nobilo (2018)

Forsgården Golf Club is a golf club located in Kungsbacka 25 km south of Gothenburg in Sweden. It hosted the Scandinavian Masters in 1993 and 1996.

== History ==
Marianne Persson initiated the formation of the club in 1982 and it was admitted to the Swedish Golf Federation in 1986. The first 18 holes designed by Sune Linde were completed in 1989 and the 27 hole course in 1998.

The club hosted the Scandinavian Masters with star-studded fields twice in the 1990s, and both tournaments ended with playoffs. In 1993 Peter Baker won with par on second extra hole over Anders Forsbrand, after they both finished on 282 (–10), two strokes ahead of Nick Faldo in solo third. Seve Ballesteros made the cut with one stroke margin in the rainy conditions which turned the course muddy and slippery. The field also included Colin Montgomerie, José María Olazábal, Vijay Singh and Ernie Els. In 1996 Lee Westwood finished on 281 (–11) to secure his first European Tour victory after Paul Broadhurst was eliminated by par on first extra hole, and he won over Russell Claydon when he holed a 40-foot putt for birdie on the second extra hole. Colin Montgomerie, John Daly, Ian Woosnam and Bernhard Langer all finished outside the top ten.

== Tournaments hosted ==
=== Professional tournaments ===
Year	Tournament	Tour	Winner
1993	Scandinavian Masters	European Tour	(England) Peter Baker
1996	Volvo Scandinavian Masters	European Tour	(England) Lee Westwood

=== Amateur tournaments ===
- 2014 Annika Invitational Europe
- 2018 European Girls' Team Championship

== See also ==
- List of golf courses in Sweden
