= Arlandastad Golf =

Golfing complex

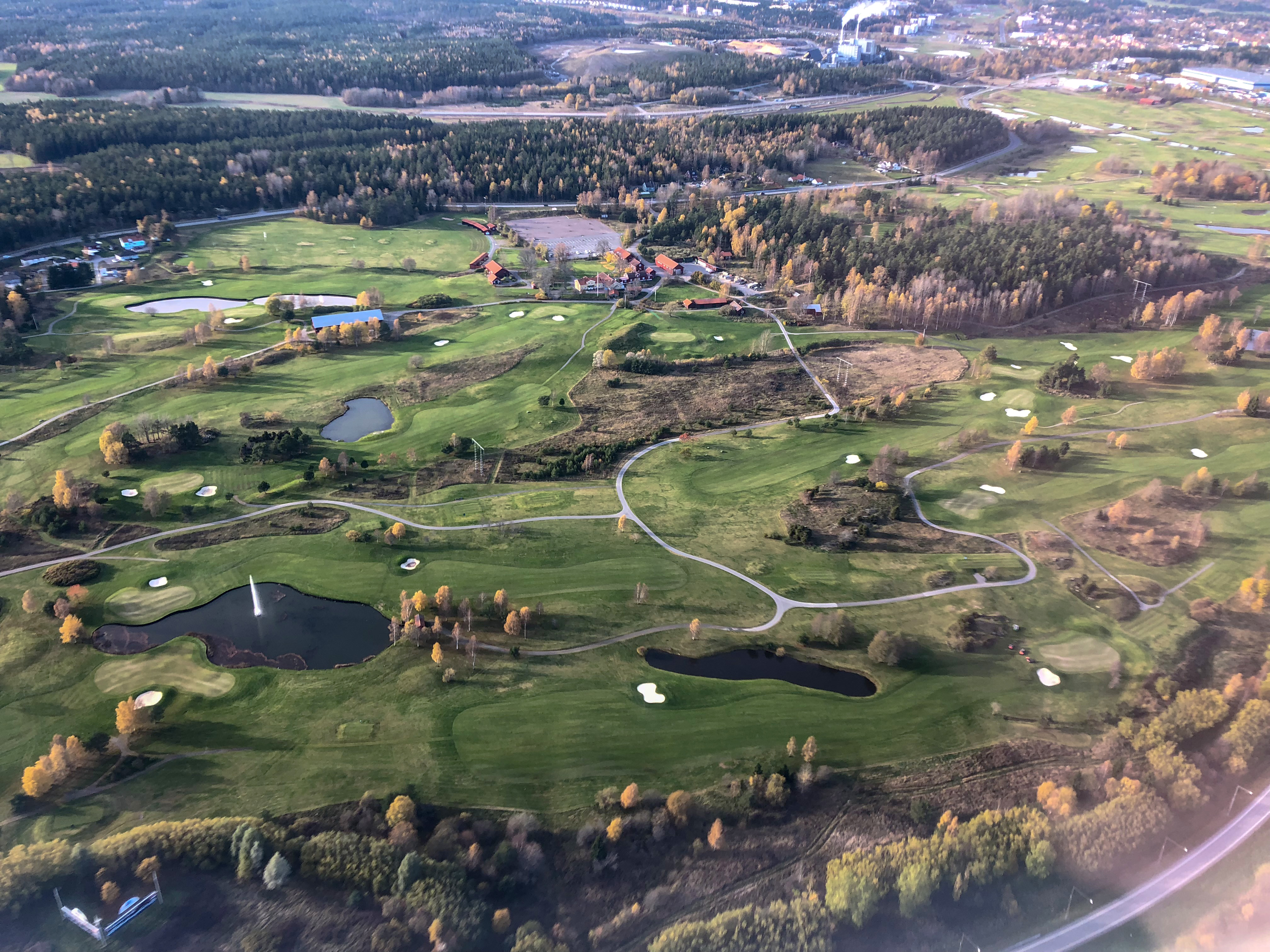

- Location in Sweden
- 59.6011°N 17.8836°E

Club information
- Location: Rosersberg, Stockholm County, Sweden
- Established: 1992 (SGF Member)
- Type: Private
- Tota holes: 36
- Tournaments: Scandinavian Masters; SAS Masters
- Website: arlandastadgolf.se

Masters Course
- Designed by: Sune Linde
- Par: 70
- Length: 6,260 m
- Course record: 62 – David Palm; 65 – Cecilia Ekelundh

New Course
- Designed by: Peter Chamberlain
- Par: 71
- Length: 5,335 m
- Course record: 63 – Jesper Parnevik

Arlandastad Golf is a 36-hole golfing complex situated near Arlanda Airport 35 km north of Stockholm, Sweden. It has hosted the Scandinavian Masters and SAS Masters on the European Tour.

== History ==
The parkland layout Masters Course was designed by Sunde Linde and inaugurated in June 1993 by Anders Forsbrand and Helen Alfredsson. In August 2001 the New Course, shorter and more links-like in character, was opened. The complex was conceived and built by real estate developer Leif Wåhlin, and has since inception been owned and operated by his privately held real estate company, Wåhlin Fastigheter AB.

The Masters Course hosted the Skandia PGA Open on the Challenge Tour in 2004 and 2005, before hosting Scandinavian Masters and SAS Masters on the European Tour in 2007 and 2008. Arlandastad has also hosted the European Tour Qualifying School First Stage on several occasions, including 2006 and 2019.

== Tournaments hosted ==
Year	Championship	Winner
2004	Skandia PGA Open	(England) Matthew King
2005	Skandia PGA Open	(Scotland) David Patrick
2007	Scandinavian Masters	(Finland) Mikko Ilonen
2008	SAS Masters	(Sweden) Peter Hanson

== See also ==
- List of golf courses in Sweden
