= Vallda Golf & Country Club =

Golf club in Kungsbacka, Sweden

Coordinates: 57.4716°N 12.0075°E

- Location in Halland County, Sweden Vallda Golf & Country Club (Sweden)

Club information
- Location: Vallda, Kungsbacka Municipality, Halland County, Sweden
- Established: 2007 (SGF Member); 2009 (18 holes opened)
- Type: Private
- Total holes: 18
- Tournaments: Scandinavian Mixed
- Website: valldagolf.se
- Designed by: Martin Hawtree; Caspar Grauballe
- Par: 72
- Length: 6,490 m

Vallda Golf & Country Club is a golf club located in Kungsbacka 30 km south of Gothenburg in Sweden. It hosted the Scandinavian Mixed in 2021, a joint event on the European Tour and Ladies European Tour.

== History ==
Plans to create a classic Scottish heathland golf course near Gothenburg were conceived in the mid-1990s and 86 hectares of meadowland surrounded by oak forest was acquired in the Vallda Valley, outside Kungsbacka. Golf course architect Martin Hawtree was commissioned to design the course drawing on inspiration from the legendary British golf courses of the 1920s, and the 18-hole course in open links-style layout was completed in July 2009.

Svensk Golf, official publication of the Swedish Golf Federation, in 2020 ranked the course #7 in Sweden using the Golf Digest methodology.

In 2021, the club hosted its first major event, the Scandinavian Mixed hosted by Henrik Stenson and Annika Sörenstam. Sanctioned jointly by the European Tour and Ladies European Tour, the tournament for the first time brought together 78 men and 78 women to compete in the same tournament, playing from different tees, for the same prize money. By dividing the results, Official World Golf Ranking points were offered for both tours, along with points toward the European Tour's and LET's respective season-long Order of Merit competitions.

== Tournaments hosted ==
=== Professional tournaments ===
Year	Tour	Tournament	Winner
2021	EUR · LET	Scandinavian Mixed	(Northern Ireland) Jonathan Caldwell

== See also ==
- List of golf courses in Sweden
