= Scandinavian TPC hosted by Annika =

Tournament information
- Location: Sweden
- Established: 1996
- Tour: Ladies European Tour
- Format: Stroke play
- Month played: August
- Final year: 2008

Tournament record score
- Aggregate: 269 Sophie Gustafson (2003)
- To par: −21 Annika Sörenstam (2006)

Final champion
- (South Korea) Amy Yang

The Scandinavian TPC hosted by Annika was a women's professional golf tournament on the Ladies European Tour held in Sweden.

The tournament was played annually 1996–2008 and starting 2005 with Annika Sörenstam as the hostess. It was known as the HP Open 2003–2004 and the Compaq Open 1996–2002.

Sörenstam has won the tournament six times which is a Ladies European Tour record, after Karrie Webb's eight wins in the ANZ Ladies Masters.

== Winners ==
| Year | Venue | Winner | Score | Margin of victory | Runners-up | Ref. |
Scandinavian TPC hosted by Annika
| 2008 | Frösåkers Golf & Country Club | (South Korea) Amy Yang | 202 (−14) | 6 strokes | (Finland) Minea Blomqvist (Norway) Lill-Kristin Sæther (France) Mélodie Bourdy (Sweden) Maria McBride | |
| 2007 | Barsebäck Golf & Country Club | (Scotland) Catriona Matthew | 279 (−9) | 3 stroke | (Sweden) Sophie Gustafson | |
| 2006 | Bro-Bålsta GK | (Sweden) Annika Sörenstam | 271 (−21) | 1 stroke | (Mexico) Lorena Ochoa | |
| 2005 | Barsebäck Golf & Country Club | (Sweden) Annika Sörenstam | 284 (−4) | 1 stroke | (United States) Natalie Gulbis | |
HP Open
| 2004 | Ullna Golf Club | (Sweden) Annika Sörenstam | 275 (−13) | 2 strokes | (Sweden) Carin Koch | |
| 2003 | Royal Drottningholm Golf Club | (Sweden) Sophie Gustafson | 269 (−19) | Playoff | (Norway) Suzann Pettersen | |
Compaq Open
| 2002 | Vasatorps GK | (Sweden) Annika Sörenstam | 271 (−17) | 4 stroke | (Sweden) Sophie Gustafson | |
| 2001 | Österåkers GK | (Spain) Raquel Carriedo | 284 (−8) | 1 stroke | (France) Karine Icher | |
| 2000 | Barsebäck Golf & Country Club | (United States) Juli Inkster | 282 (−6) | 1 stroke | (Sweden) Sophie Gustafson | |
| 1999 | Österåkers GK | (England) Laura Davies | 277 (−15) | 4 strokes | (Sweden) Helen Alfredsson | |
| 1998 | Barsebäck Golf & Country Club | (Sweden) Annika Sörenstam | 279 (−9) | 10 strokes | (Sweden) Helen Alfredsson (Sweden) Catrin Nilsmark (England) Johanna Head | |
| 1997 | Österåkers GK | (Sweden) Annika Sörenstam | 277 (−11) | 6 strokes | (Sweden) Catrin Nilsmark | |
| 1996 | Örebro GK | (Italy) Federica Dassù | 279 (−13) | Playoff | (Scotland) Kathryn Marshall (Sweden) Helen Alfredsson | |
