= Scandinavian Masters =

Former golf tournament in Sweden

Coordinates: 57°29′N 11°59′E

Volvo Car Scandinavian Mixed

Tournament information
- Location: Helsingborg, Sweden
- Established: 1991
- Course: Vasatorp Golf Club
- Par: 72
- Length: 6,909 yards (6,318 m)
- Tours: European Tour; Ladies European Tour
- Format: Stroke play
- Prize fund: US$2,000,000
- Month played: June
- Final year: 2024

Tournament record score
- Aggregate: 261 Erik van Rooyen (2019)
- To par: −24 Linn Grant (2022)

Final champion
- (Sweden) Linn Grant

Location map
- Location in Sweden

The Scandinavian Masters was an annual golf tournament on the European Tour played in Sweden. In 2020, the tournament became co-sanctioned with the Ladies European Tour and was rebranded as the Scandinavian Mixed, in which both male and female golfers competed.

== History ==
The tournament had its origins in the Volvo Open and the Scandinavian Enterprise Open, which, in 1973, became the first Swedish stop on the European Tour schedule. In 1991, the SEO merged with the PLM Open, with the resultant tournament being called the Scandinavian Masters.

The Scandinavian Masters was generally the only European Tour event to be held in Scandinavia, and in 2013 had a prize fund of €1,500,000, which was at the lower end of the scale for European Tour events held in the tour's home continent.

Until 2011, the tournament was played at the end of July or the beginning of August each year. For 2012, it moved to the first weekend in June, and was played from Wednesday to Saturday to allow players more time to travel to the following week's U.S. Open. From 2013 to 2017 it was played in late May/early June, two weeks before the U.S. Open, but in 2018 it was played in August.

In 2019 Lagardère Group passed management of the tournament on to the European Tour, which renamed it Scandinavian Invitation.

=== Mixed event ===
In 2020 the European Tour and Ladies European Tour created the Scandinavian Mixed hosted by Henrik and Annika, for the first time bringing 78 men and 78 women together to compete in the same tournament for the same prize money, but playing from different tees. Official World Golf Ranking points are offered for both tours, along with points toward the European Tour's and LET's respective season-long competitions, as well as Ryder Cup and Solheim Cup points, if applicable, which require the results to be divided between men and women.

The first event was originally scheduled to take place in June 2020, however it was cancelled like many other events at the time, due to the COVID-19 pandemic.

The event did return in June 2021, with Jonathan Caldwell winning the inaugural mixed event; shooting a final-round 64 to beat Adrián Otaegui by one shot. Alice Hewson was the highest placed female; finishing in third place.

The 2022 event created history as Linn Grant became the first woman to win on the European Tour. She won by nine strokes ahead of Henrik Stenson and Marc Warren. The next best-placed female was Gabriella Cowley, 14 strokes behind Grant. Linn Grant went on to win again in 2024, beating Calum Hill and Sebastian Söderberg by one shot. The 2024 event proved to be the final edition of the tournament and in October 2024 it was confirmed that the tournament would not return in 2025.

== Venues ==
The following venues have been used since the founding of the Scandinavian Masters in 1991.

Venue	Location	First	Last	Times
Royal Drottningholm Golf Club	Uppland	1991	1994	2
Barsebäck Golf & Country Club	Scania	1992	2017	10
Forsgården Golf Club	Halland	1993	1996	2
Kungsängen Golf Club	Uppland	1998	2005	4
Arlandastad Golf	Uppland	2007	2008	2
Bro Hof Slott Golf Club	Uppland	2010	2016	5
PGA Sweden National	Scania	2014	2015	2
Hills Golf Club	Västergötland	2018	2019	2
Vallda Golf & Country Club	Halland	2021	2021	1
Halmstad Golf Club	Halland	2022	2022	1
Ullna Golf & Country Club	Uppland	2023	2023	1
Vasatorp Golf Club	Scania	2024	2024	1

== Winners ==
Year	Tour(s) (Note: EUR − European Tour; LET − Ladies European Tour.)	Winner	Score	To par	Margin of victory	Runner(s)-up	Winner's share (€)	Venue
Volvo Car Scandinavian Mixed
2024	EUR, LET	(Sweden) Linn Grant (2)	271	−17	1 stroke	(Scotland) Calum Hill (Sweden) Sebastian Söderberg	312,189	Vasatorp
2023	EUR, LET	(England) Dale Whitnell	267	−21	3 strokes	(United States) Sean Crocker	315,455	Ullna
2022	EUR, LET	(Sweden) Linn Grant	264	−24	9 strokes	(Sweden) Henrik Stenson (Scotland) Marc Warren	319,717	Halmstad
Scandinavian Mixed
2021	EUR, LET	(Northern Ireland) Jonathan Caldwell	271	−17	1 stroke	(Spain) Adrián Otaegui	145,160	Vallda
2020	EUR, LET	Cancelled due to the COVID-19 pandemic						
Scandinavian Invitation
2019	EUR	(South Africa) Erik van Rooyen	261	−19	1 stroke	(England) Matt Fitzpatrick	250,000	Hills GC
Nordea Masters
2018	EUR	(England) Paul Waring	266	−14	Playoff	(South Africa) Thomas Aiken	250,000	Hills GC
2017	EUR	(Italy) Renato Paratore	281	−11	1 stroke	(England) Matt Fitzpatrick (England) Chris Wood	250,000	Barsebäck
2016	EUR	(England) Matt Fitzpatrick	272	−16	3 strokes	(Denmark) Lasse Jensen	250,000	Bro Hof Slott
2015	EUR	(Sweden) Alex Norén (2)	276	−12	4 strokes	(Denmark) Søren Kjeldsen	250,000	PGA Sweden National
2014	EUR	(Thailand) Thongchai Jaidee	272	−16	Playoff	(France) Victor Dubuisson (Scotland) Stephen Gallacher	250,000	PGA Sweden National
2013	EUR	(Finland) Mikko Ilonen (2)	267	−21	3 strokes	(Sweden) Jonas Blixt	250,000	Bro Hof Slott
2012	EUR	(England) Lee Westwood (3)	269	−19	5 strokes	(England) Ross Fisher	250,000	Bro Hof Slott
2011	EUR	(Sweden) Alex Norén	273	−15	7 strokes	(England) Richard Finch	250,000	Bro Hof Slott
Nordea Scandinavian Masters
2010	EUR	(Sweden) Richard S. Johnson	277	−11	1 stroke	(Argentina) Rafael Echenique	266,660	Bro Hof Slott
SAS Masters
2009	EUR	(Argentina) Ricardo González	282	−10	2 strokes	(Wales) Jamie Donaldson	166,660	Barsebäck
2008	EUR	(Sweden) Peter Hanson	271	−9	1 stroke	(England) Nick Dougherty (Sweden) Pelle Edberg	266,660	Arlandastad
Scandinavian Masters
2007	EUR	(Finland) Mikko Ilonen	274	−6	2 strokes	(France) Christian Cévaër (England) Nick Dougherty (France) Jean-Baptiste Gonnet (Sweden) Peter Hedblom (Germany) Martin Kaymer	266,660	Arlandastad
EnterCard Scandinavian Masters
2006	EUR	(Scotland) Marc Warren	278	−10	Playoff	(Sweden) Robert Karlsson	266,660	Barsebäck
Scandinavian Masters by Carlsberg
2005	EUR	(Australia) Mark Hensby	262	−22	Playoff	(Sweden) Henrik Stenson	266,660	Kungsängen
2004	EUR	(England) Luke Donald	272	−16	5 strokes	(Sweden) Peter Hanson	266,660	Barsebäck
Scandic Carlsberg Scandinavian Masters
2003	EUR	(Australia) Adam Scott	277	−11	2 strokes	(England) Nick Dougherty	316,660	Barsebäck
Volvo Scandinavian Masters
2002	EUR	(Northern Ireland) Graeme McDowell	270	−14	1 stroke	(South Africa) Trevor Immelman	316,660	Kungsängen
2001	EUR	(Scotland) Colin Montgomerie (3)	274	−14	1 stroke	(England) Ian Poulter (England) Lee Westwood	300,000	Barsebäck
2000	EUR	(England) Lee Westwood (2)	270	−14	3 strokes	(New Zealand) Michael Campbell	266,660	Kungsängen
1999	EUR	(Scotland) Colin Montgomerie (2)	268	−20	9 strokes	(Sweden) Jesper Parnevik	233,320	Barsebäck
1998	EUR	(Sweden) Jesper Parnevik (2)	273	−11	3 strokes	(Northern Ireland) Darren Clarke	186,662	Kungsängen
1997	EUR	(Sweden) Joakim Haeggman	270	−18	4 strokes	(Spain) Ignacio Garrido	175,000	Barsebäck
1996	EUR	(England) Lee Westwood	281	−7	Playoff	(England) Paul Broadhurst (England) Russell Claydon	163,324	Forsgården
1995	EUR	(Sweden) Jesper Parnevik	270	−18	5 strokes	(Scotland) Colin Montgomerie	151,662	Barsebäck
Scandinavian Masters
1994	EUR	(Fiji) Vijay Singh	268	−20	3 strokes	(Zimbabwe) Mark McNulty	151,662	Royal Drottningholm
1993	EUR	(England) Peter Baker	278	−10	Playoff	(Sweden) Anders Forsbrand	151,662	Forsgården
1992	EUR	(England) Nick Faldo	277	−11	3 strokes	(Australia) Robert Allenby (England) Peter Baker (Canada) Danny Mijovic (New Zealand) Frank Nobilo (Spain) José María Olazábal (Australia) Peter O'Malley	140,000	Barsebäck
1991	EUR	(Scotland) Colin Montgomerie	270	−18	1 stroke	(Spain) Seve Ballesteros	140,000	Royal Drottningholm

== See also ==
- List of sporting events in Sweden
