= Swedish Golf Federation =

Golf governing body in Sweden

- Sport: Golf
- Jurisdiction: National
- Abbreviation: SGF
- Founded: 1904
- Affiliation: International Golf Federation (IGF)
- Regional affiliation: European Golf Association (EGA)
- Headquarters: Stockholm, Sweden
- Chairman: Maria Möller
- Secretary: Gunnar Håkansson

Official website
- sgf.golf.se

The Swedish Golf Federation (Swedish: Svenska Golfförbundet, SGF) is the governing body for the sport of golf in Sweden, founded in 1904.

The federation is responsible for administering the Rules of Golf, as laid down by The R&A, at the national level. It organizes tournaments, manages the national teams, and promotes the game. As of 2025, the federation organized 448 golf clubs and 548,856 individual members with 588,069 memberships, 78% male and 22% female. This makes it the third largest sports federation in Sweden in terms of active members, behind association football and athletics in first and second and place.

SGF is a member of the European Golf Association (EGA). Thanks to a high national participation rate of almost 5%, SGF is EGA's third largest national member behind England and Germany (661,805 and 640,181 members respectively as of 2016).

== See also ==
- SM Match Play
- Swedish International Stroke Play Championship
- Swedish Golfer of the Year
- Swedish Golf Tour (men)
- Swedish Golf Tour (women)
- List of Swedish professional golfers
