= Johannesberg Ladies Open =

Tournament information
- Location: Gottröra, Uppland, Sweden
- Established: 2017
- Course: Johannesberg Golf Club
- Par: 72
- Tour: Swedish Golf Tour
- Format: 54-hole stroke play
- Prize fund: SEK 80,000
- Final year: 2020

Tournament record score
- Aggregate: 206 Martina Edberg
- To par: −10 as above

Final champion
- (Sweden) Louise Rydqvist

The Johannesberg Ladies Open was a women's professional golf tournament on the Swedish Golf Tour, played between 2017 and 2020. It was always held at Johannesberg Golf Club near Stockholm, Sweden.

== Winners ==
Year	Winner	Score	Margin of victory	Runner(s)-up	Prize fund (SEK)	Ref
2020	(Sweden) Louise Rydqvist (a)	141 (–3)	2 strokes	(Sweden) Kajsa Arwefjäll (a) (Sweden) Linda Lundqvist (Sweden) Anna Magnusson	80,000	
2019	(Sweden) Louisa Carlbom (a)	210 (–6)	3 strokes	(Sweden) Josefine Nyqvist	150,000	
2018	(Sweden) Anna Magnusson	207 (–9)	2 strokes	(Sweden) Filippa Möörk (Norway) Karoline Stormo (a)	150,000	
2017	(Sweden) Martina Edberg	206 (–10)	6 strokes	(Sweden) Sofia Ljungqvist	150,000	
