= 2018 Swedish Golf Tour (women) =

33rd season of the Swedish Golf Tour (women)

2018 Swedish Golf Tour season
- Duration: May 2018 – September 2018
- Number of official events: 13
- Most wins: 2 wins (tie): (Sweden) Isabella Ramsay (Sweden) Anna Magnusson
- Order of Merit winner: (Sweden) Filippa Möörk

The 2018 Swedish Golf Tour was the 33rd season of the Swedish Golf Tour, a series of professional golf tournaments for women held in Sweden and Norway.

A number of the tournaments also featured on the 2018 LET Access Series (LETAS).

== Schedule ==
The season consisted of 13 tournaments played between May and September, where two events were held in Norway.

| Date | Tournament | Venue | Winner | Runner(s)-up | Purse (SEK) | Tour | Ref |
|---|---|---|---|---|---|---|---|
| 6 May | Tegelberga Open | Tegelberga | (Sweden) Filippa Möörk | (Sweden) Linda Wessberg | 100,000 | | |
| 22 May | Nes Open | Nes, Norway | (Sweden) My Leander | (Sweden) Frida Gustafsson-Spång | 300,000 | | |
| 26 May | Carpe Diem Beds Open | Flommen | (Sweden) Isabella Ramsay | (Sweden) Moa Folke (Denmark) Louise Markvardsen | 100,000 | | |
| 30 May | Carpe Diem Beds Trophy | Ljunghusen | (Sweden) Sara Kjellker | (Sweden) Lisa Pettersson | 100,000 | | |
| 17 Jun | Hinton Golf Open | Hinton Sofiedal | (Sweden) Anna Magnusson | (Denmark) Malene Krølbøll Hansen | 100,000 | | |
| 21 Jun | Skaftö Open | Skaftö | (Denmark) Malene Krølbøll Hansen | (Sweden) Filippa Möörk | 300,000 | | |
| 30 Jun | SM Match | Österåker | (Sweden) Lisa Pettersson | (Sweden) Sofie Bringner | 200,000 | | |
| 14 Jul | Johannesberg Open | Johannesberg | (Sweden) Anna Magnusson | (Sweden) Filippa Möörk (Norway) Karoline Stormo (a) | 150,000 | | |
| 2 Aug | Säljfast Ladies PGA Championship | Sölvesborg | (Sweden) Isabella Ramsay | (Sweden) Sofie Bringner | 175,000 | | |
| 11 Aug | Anna Nordqvist Västerås Open | Västerås | (France) Emie Peronnin | (Sweden) Maja Stark (a) | €35,000 | LETAS | |
| 17 Aug | Slite Open | Slite | (Sweden) Annelie Sjöholm | (Sweden) Mimmi Bergman | 100,000 | | |
| 1 Sep | Turfman Allerum Open | Allerum | (England) Rachael Goodall | (Spain) Maria Palacios | €35,000 | LETAS | |
| 29 Sep | Nøtterøy Open | Nøtterøy, Norway | (Sweden) Sarah Nilsson | (Sweden) Isabella Ramsay | 400,000 | | |

Swedish PGA Championship
Swedish Matchplay Championship

== See also ==
- 2018 Swedish Golf Tour (men's tour)
