= Yuna Nishimura =

Japanese professional golfer (born 2000)

Yuna Nishimura 西村 優菜
- Nishimura in 2026

Personal information
- Nationality: Japan
- Born: 4 August 2000 (age 26) Sakai, Osaka Prefecture, Kansai, Japan
- Height: 150 cm (4 ft 11 in)

Career
- Sport: Golf
- Turned professional: 2019
- Current tours: LPGA Tour (joined 2023); LPGA of Japan Tour (joined 2020)
- Professional wins: 7

Number of wins by tour
- LPGA Tour: 1
- LPGA of Japan Tour: 6

Best results in LPGA major championships
- Chevron Championship: T44: 2025
- Women's PGA C'ship: T39: 2023
- U.S. Women's Open: T39: 2024
- Women's British Open: T21: 2023
- Evian Championship: T15: 2022

Achievements and awards
- LPGA of Japan Tour Shiseido Beauty of the Year: 2020–21

Yuna Nishimura (西村 優菜, Nishimura Yuna) (born 4 August 2000) is a Japanese professional golfer. After playing on the LPGA of Japan Tour where she has six wins, she joined the LPGA Tour in 2023.

== Early life and amateur career ==
Nishimura attended Osaka University of Commerce High School. As an amateur, she finished 6th at the 2016 Japan Women's Open, four strokes behind winner Nasa Hataoka. In 2017, she was runner-up at the Japan Junior Championship and individually at the Junior Golf World Cup.

In 2018, she was runner-up in the Women's Amateur Asia-Pacific and individually at the Queen Sirikit Cup, both times behind Atthaya Thitikul. She led her team to a win at the 2018 Junior Golf World Cup and a runner-up finish at the 2018 Espirito Santo Trophy in Ireland, behind the United States. In 2019, she won the Riversdale Cup in Australia.

== Professional career ==
Nishimura turned professional in November 2019 and joined the LPGA of Japan Tour in January 2020. She recorded four victories in the combined 2020–21 LPGA of Japan Tour season and rose into the top-100 in the Women's World Golf Rankings after her maiden win at Mitsubishi Electric/Hisako Higuchi Ladies Golf Tournament. That secured a spot in her first major, the 2020 U.S. Women's Open.

In 2021, she won three tournaments and in 2022 a further two, to rise to No. 34 in the world rankings and finish second on the 2022 JLPGA money list. She was in contention at the 2022 Evian Championship where she was tied 5th after the first round and ultimately finished tied 15th.

Nishimura earned her card for the 2023 LPGA Tour through qualifying school. In her rookie season, her best result was a tie for 3rd at the Walmart NW Arkansas Championship and she finished 48th in the rankings.

== Amateur wins ==
- 2019 Riversdale Cup

== Professional wins (7) ==
=== LPGA Tour wins (1) ===
Legend
Major championships (0)
Other LPGA Tour (1)

| No. | Date | Tournament | Winning score | To par | Margin of victory | Runner(s)-up |
|---|---|---|---|---|---|---|
| 1 | 27 Sep 2026 | Walmart NW Arkansas Championship | 63-63-66=192 | −21 | 5 strokes | (South Korea) Chun In-gee (Japan) Akie Iwai (Thailand) Chanettee Wannasaen |

=== LPGA of Japan Tour wins (6) ===
| No. | Date | Tournament | Winning score | To par | Margin of victory | Runner(s)-up |
|---|---|---|---|---|---|---|
| 1 | 1 Nov 2020 | Mitsubishi Electric/Hisako Higuchi Ladies Golf Tournament | 69-71-65=205 | −11 | 1 stroke | (Japan) Minami Katsu |
| 2 | 9 May 2021 | **World Ladies Championship Salonpas Cup** | 69-65-70=204 | −12 | 3 strokes | (Japan) Mone Inami (Japan) Momoko Osato (Japan) Reika Usui |
| 3 | 19 Sep 2021 | Sumitomo Life Vitality Ladies Tokai Classic | 71-63=134 | −10 | 2 strokes | (Japan) Momoko Osato (Japan) Nozomi Uetake |
| 4 | 26 Sep 2021 | Miyagi TV Cup Dunlop Ladies Open Golf Tournament | 66-65-70=201 | −15 | 3 strokes | (Japan) Saki Asai |
| 5 | 19 Jun 2022 | Nichirei Ladies | 65-68-66=199 | −17 | 3 strokes | (Japan) Haruka Morita |
| 6 | 10 Jul 2022 | Nippon Ham Ladies Classic | 67-67-66-70=270 | −18 | 1 stroke | (Japan) Mao Nozawa |

Tournaments in bold denotes major tournaments in LPGA of Japan Tour.

== Results in LPGA majors ==
Results not in chronological order.

| Tournament | 2020 | 2021 | 2022 | 2023 | 2024 | 2025 | 2026 |
|---|---|---|---|---|---|---|---|
| Chevron Championship | | | | T56 | T67 | T44 | CUT |
| U.S. Women's Open | CUT | | CUT | CUT | T39 | CUT | |
| Women's PGA Championship | | | | T39 | CUT | T61 | CUT |
| The Evian Championship | NT | | T15 | CUT | T44 | | CUT |
| Women's British Open | | | CUT | T21 | CUT | | |

Did not play

CUT = missed the half-way cut
NT = no tournament
T = tied

=== Summary ===
| Tournament | Wins | 2nd | 3rd | Top-5 | Top-10 | Top-25 | Events | Cuts made |
|---|---|---|---|---|---|---|---|---|
| Chevron Championship | 0 | 0 | 0 | 0 | 0 | 0 | 4 | 3 |
| U.S. Women's Open | 0 | 0 | 0 | 0 | 0 | 0 | 5 | 1 |
| Women's PGA Championship | 0 | 0 | 0 | 0 | 0 | 0 | 4 | 2 |
| The Evian Championship | 0 | 0 | 0 | 0 | 0 | 1 | 4 | 2 |
| Women's British Open | 0 | 0 | 0 | 0 | 0 | 1 | 3 | 1 |
| Totals | 0 | 0 | 0 | 0 | 0 | 2 | 20 | 9 |

- Most consecutive cuts made – 3 (2023 Women's British Open – 2024 U.S. Women's Open)

== Team appearances ==
Amateur

- Queen Sirikit Cup (representing Japan): 2017, 2018
- Junior Golf World Cup (representing Japan): 2017, 2018 (winners)
- Patsy Hankins Trophy (representing Asia/Pacific): 2018
- Espirito Santo Trophy (representing Japan): 2018
