= 2016 European Ladies' Team Championship =

Golf competition

Tournament information
- Dates: 5–9 July 2016
- Location: Garðabær, Iceland; 64.059991°N 21.892018°W
- Course: Oddur Golf Club (Urriðavöllur Course)
- Organized by: European Golf Association
- Format: 36 holes stroke play Knock-out match-play

Statistics
- Par: 72
- Length: 5,881 yards (5,378 m)
- Field: 20 teams 120 players

Champion
- England; Emma Allen, Alice Hewson, Bronte Law, Meghan MacLaren, Elisabeth Prior, Olivia Winning
- Qualification round: 745 (+25); Final match 4–3

Location map
- Location in Europe Location in Iceland

The 2016 European Ladies' Team Championship took place 5–9 July at Oddur Golf Club in Garðabær, Iceland. It was the 33rd women's golf amateur European Ladies' Team Championship.

== Venue ==
Oddur Golf Club was established in 1990 with a nine-hole course designed by Hannes Thorsteinsson, located in the municipality of Garðabær, 6 kilometres south of the city center of Reykjavík, Iceland. It was extended to the Urriðavöllur 18-hole-course in 1997, a heathland course flanked by lava from the dormant volcano Búrfell.

The championship course was set up with par 72.

== Format ==
All participating teams played two qualification rounds of stroke-play with six players, counted the five best scores for each team.

The eight best teams formed flight A, in knock-out match-play over the next three days. The teams were seeded based on their positions after the stroke-play. The first placed team was drawn to play the quarter-final against the eight placed team, the second against the seventh, the third against the sixth and the fourth against the fifth. In each match between two nation teams, two 18-hole foursome games and five 18-hole single games were played. Teams were allowed to switch players during the team matches, selecting other players in to the afternoon single games after the morning foursome games. Teams knocked out after the quarter-finals played one foursome game and four single games in each of their remaining matches. Games all square after 18 holes were declared halved, if the team match was already decided.

The eight teams placed 9–16 in the qualification stroke-play formed flight B, to play similar knock-out match-play, with one foursome game and four single games, to decide their final positions.

The four teams placed 17–20 in the qualification stroke-play formed flight C, to meet each other, with one foursome game and four single games, to decide their final positions.

== Teams ==
20 nation teams contested the event. Each team consisted of six players. Poland took part for the first time.

Players in the teams

Country	Players
Austria	Leonie Bettel, Nadine Dreher, Ines Fendt, Emma Spitz, Julia Unterweger, Lea Zeitler
Belgium	Clara Aveling, Leslie Cloots, Charlotte De Corte, Tamara Luccioli, Céline Manche, Elodie Van Dievoet
Czech Republic	Barbora Baková, Kristýna Frýdlová, Kateřina Krásová, Marie Lunácková, Tereza Melecka, Jana Melichová, Kateřina Vlasínová
Denmark	Stephanie Amalie Astrup, Cecilie Bofill, Malene Krølbøll Hansen, Marie Lund Hansen, Puk Lyng Thomsen, Line Toft Hansen
England	Emma Allen, Alice Hewson, Bronte Law, Meghan MacLaren, Elisabeth Prior, Olivia Winning
Finland	Matilda Castren, Jenna Maihaniemi, Hannele Mikkola, Ellinoora Moiso, Emily Penttila, Petra Salko
France	Shannon Aubert, Emma Broze, Mathilda Cappeliez, Agathe Laisné, Anais Meyssonnier, Marion Veysseyre
Germany	Antonia Eberhard, Leonie Harm, Sophie Hausmann, Esther Henseleit, Laura Fünfstück, Lena Schäffner
Iceland	Signý Arnorsdottir, Guðrún Bra Björgvinsdóttir, Berglind Björnsdóttir, Ragnhildur Kristinsdóttir, Anna Sólveig Snorradóttir, Sunna Vidisdottir
Ireland	Maria Dunne, Jessica Carty, Louise Coffey, Olivia Mehaffey, Jessica Ross, Sinead Sexton
Italy	Lucrezia Colombotto Rosso, Bianca Maria Fabrizio, Roberta Liti, Carlotta Ricolfi, Arianna Scaletti, Tasa Torbica
Netherlands	Zhen Bontan, Roos Haarman, Merit Harryvan, Romy Meekers, Charlotte Puts, Dewi Weber
Norway	Mariell Bruun, Dorthea Forbrigd, Renate Grimstad, Stina Resen, Kristin Simonsen, Marthe Wold
Poland	Dominika Gradecka, Nastasia Kossacky, Nicole Polivchak, Kataryna Selwent, Dorota Zalewska, Maria Zrodowska
Scotland	Eilidh Briggs, Connie Jaffrey, Hannah McCook, Jessica Meek, Heather Munro, Rachael Taylor
Slovenia	Nastja Banovec, Ana Belac, Lara Jecnik, Vida Obersnel, Ursa Orehek, Katja Pogačar
Spain	Celia Barquín Arozamena, Fátima Fernández Cano, Lee Ha-rang, Ainhoa Olarra Mujika, Maria Parra Luque, Luna Sobrón
Sweden	Martina Edberg, Frida Gustavsson Spång, Emma Henriksson, Linnea Johansson, Louise Ridderström, Linnea Ström
Switzerland	Gioia Carpinelli, Vanessa Knecht, Azelia Meichtry, Kim Métraux, Morgane Métraux, Rachel Rossel
Wales	Lauren Hillier, Teleri Hughes, Megan Lockett, Katherine O'Connor, Jordan Ryan, Chloe Williams

== Winners ==
Five times champions Spain lead the opening 36-hole qualifying competition, with a score of 10 over par 730, one stroke ahead of team Norway.

Individual leader in the 36-hole stroke-play competition was Maria Parra Luque, Spain, with a score of 4 under par 140, one stroke ahead of Antonia Eberhard, Germany.

Team England won the championship, beating Spain 4–3 in the final and earned their ninth title and first since 1993. Six of the seven matches in the final went to the 18th hole. The championship was decided when, Solheim Cup-player to be, Bronte Law, England, sank the winning putt on the 18th green in her singles match against Ainhoa Olarra Mujika, Spain.

Team Germany earned third place, beating Switzerland 4 1/2–2 1/2 in the bronze match.

== Results ==
Qualification round

Team standings

Place	Country	Score	To par
1	Spain	373-357=730	+10
2	Norway	362-369=731	+11
3	Sweden	377-358=735	+15
4	Germany	375-362=737	+17
5	Denmark	375-368=743	+23
6	England	370-375=745	+25
7	Switzerland	386-365=751	+31
8	Finland	375-381=756	+36
9	Ireland	379-378=757	+37
10	France	374-385=759	+39
11	Italy	388-372=760	+40
T12	Scotland *	378-383=761	+41
T12	Netherlands	389-372=761	+41
14	Belgium	392-375=767	+47
15	Iceland	392-377=769	+49
T16	Slovenia *	396-375=771	+51
T16	Czech Republic	389-382=771	+51
18	Austria	388-388=776	+56
19	Wales	394-383=777	+57
20	Poland	405-395=800	+80

* Note: In the event of a tie the order was determined by the better total non-counting scores.

Individual leaders

Place	Player	Country	Score	To par
1	Maria Parra Luque	Spain	69-71=140	−4
2	Antonia Eberhard	Germany	73-68=141	−3
3	Louise Ridderström	Sweden	71-71=142	−2
4	Marthe Wold	Norway	73-70=143	−1
T5	Zhen Bontan	Netherlands	75-69=144	E
T5	Malene Krølbøll Hansen	Denmark	74-70=144	E
T5	Morgane Métraux	Switzerland	75-66=144	E
T5	Stina Resen	Norway	70-74=144	E
T9	Esther Henselett	Germany	77-69=146	+2
T9	Lee Ha-rang	Spain	77-69=146	+2
T9	Meghan MacLaren	England	73-73=146	+2
T9	Olivia Mehaffey	Ireland	73-73=146	+2

Note: There was no official award for the lowest individual score.

Flight A

Bracket

Quarter finals
Spain	4
Finland	3
Germany	4.5
Denmark	2.5
England	4
Sweden	3
Switzerland	4.5
Norway	2.5

Semi finals
Spain	5
Germany	2
England	4
Switzerland	3

Final
England	4
Spain	3
Bronze match
Germany	4.5
Switzerland	2.5

Elimination matches
Denmark	4
Finland	1
Sweden	3.5
Norway	1.5

Match for 5th place
Sweden	3.5
Denmark	1.5
Match for 7th place
Norway	4.5
Finland	0.5

Final games

England	Spain
4	3
A. Hewson / M. MacLaren	A. Olarra Mujika / Lee Ha-rang 1 hole
B. Law / E. Allen 5 & 4	L. Sobron / M. Parra Luque
Meghan MacLaren 1 hole	Celia Barquin Arozamena
Alice Hewson 1 hole	Luna Sobron
Emma Allen	Lee Ha-rang 1 hole
Bronte Law 1 hole	Ainhoa Olarra Mujika
Olivia Winning	Maria Parra Luque 1 hole

Flight B

Bracket

Round 1
Slovenia	3.5
Ireland	1.5
Scotland	3
Netherlands	2
Italy	3.5
Belgium	1.5
France	3
Iceland	2

Round 2
Scotland	4
Slovenia	1
Italy	3
France	2

Match for 9th place
Scotland	3.5
Italy	1.5
Match for 11th place
Slovenia	3
France	2

Elimination matches
Netherlands	3.5
Ireland	1.5
Belgium	4
Iceland	1

Match for 13th place
Netherlands	3
Belgium	2
Match for 15th place
Ireland	3
Iceland	2

Flight C

Team matches

1	Poland	Czech Republic	0
3		2	

1	Austria	Wales	0
4		1	

1	Austria	Poland	0
4		1	

1	Wales	Czech Republic	0
3		2	

1	Austria	Czech Republic	0
3		2	

1	Wales	Poland	0
3		2	

Team standings

Country	Place	W	T	L	Game points	Points
Austria	17	3	0	0	11–4	3
Wales	18	2	0	1	7–8	2
Poland	19	1	0	2	6–9	1
Czech Republic	20	0	0	3	6–9	0

Final standings

Place	Country
1st place, gold medalist(s)	England
2nd place, silver medalist(s)	Spain
3rd place, bronze medalist(s)	Germany
4	Switzerland
5	Sweden
6	Denmark
7	Norway
8	Finland
9	Scotland
10	Italy
11	Slovenia
12	France
13	Netherlands
14	Belgium
15	Ireland
16	Iceland
17	Austria
18	Wales
19	Poland
20	Czech Republic

== See also ==
- Espirito Santo Trophy – biennial world amateur team golf championship for women organized by the International Golf Federation.
- European Amateur Team Championship – European amateur team golf championship for men organised by the European Golf Association.
- European Ladies Amateur Championship – European amateur individual golf championship for women organised by the European Golf Association.
