= Linnea Johansson (golfer) =

Swedish professional golfer (born 1993)

Personal information
- Nationality: Sweden
- Born: 25 August 1993 (age 33) Växjö, Sweden

Career
- Sport: Golf
- College: Nova Southeastern University; Oklahoma State University
- Turned professional: 2017
- Former tours: Ladies European Tour (joined 2023); LPGA Tour (joined 2020); Symetra Tour (joined 2018)

Best results in LPGA major championships
- Chevron Championship: DNP
- Women's PGA C'ship: CUT: 2022
- U.S. Women's Open: T51: 2022
- Women's British Open: DNP
- Evian Championship: DNP

Achievements and awards
- Sunshine State Conference Player of the Year: 2013

Linnea Johansson (born 25 August 1993) is a Swedish professional golfer who has played on the LPGA Tour and the Ladies European Tour. She was runner-up in the 2020 Mission Inn Resort and Club Championship and the 2021 Prasco Charity Championship on the Symetra Tour.

== Amateur career ==
Johansson was born in Växjö and grew up in Älmhult. She started playing golf at age 10 at Grönhögen Golf Links, Öland. She attended Rikdsidrottsgymnasiet in Ljungbyhed between 2009 and 2012, and represents Båstad Golf Club.

She became a member of the Swedish National Team in 2010. She represented Sweden at the European Ladies' Team Championship five times, and won the bronze at the 2017 event in Portugal together with Linnea Ström, Michaela Finn, Elin Esborn, My Leander and Filippa Möörk, her last tournament as an amateur. Johansson was the individual winner at the initial stroke-play competition.

Johansson played college golf in the United States between 2012 and 2017. She competed with the Nova Southeastern Sharks women's golf team as a freshman and earned Division II Women's Golf Coaches Association (WGCA) First Team All-American honors, and was 2013 Sunshine State Conference Player of the Year. She transferred to Oklahoma State University and joined the Oklahoma State Cowgirls golf team at as a redshirt freshman in the fall of 2013. In 2016, she posted the second-lowest stroke average (72.74) in program history and led all Division I competitors with 132 birdies. She was a three-time All-Big 12 performer in 2015, 2016 and 2017, joining a group of only eight Cowgirls to earn at least three All-Big 12 selections, including Maria Bodén, Caroline Hedwall, Pernilla Lindberg, Karin Sjödin and Linda Wessberg.

== Professional career ==
Johansson graduated in 2017 and started playing on the Symetra Tour. She made steady progress over the first few seasons and in 2019 she made the cut in 18 out of 20 events, and finished 18th on the money list. She finished T26 at the LPGA Q-Series to earn status for the 2020 LPGA Tour season, after missing the cut by one stroke the previous year.

In 2020, she was runner-up in the Mission Inn Resort and Club Championship behind Matilda Castren, and in 2021 she was runner-up at the Prasco Charity Championship in Ohio, two strokes behind Meghan MacLaren.

Johansson earned her card for the 2022 LPGA Tour through qualifying school. In 2022, she made the cut in 11 of 20 starts and finished 120th on the Official Points List and went back to LPGA Q-Series, where she finished 8th to keep her card.

In 2023, Johansson also joined the Ladies European Tour, where her best finish was a 9th place at the Aramco Team Series - Florida. She shot a bogey-free 64, 7 under par, to take the lead after one round of the inaugural JM Eagle LA Championship in Los Angeles, one shot ahead of Gemma Dryburgh and Minjee Lee, ultimately finishing tied 61st. She finished 72nd on the LET Order of Merit in 2023 and 90th in 2024 after a season-best 9th place at the KPMG Women's Irish Open, and retired from tour golf at the end of the 2024 season.

== Amateur wins ==
- 2008 Norberg Open, Ljunghusen Open
- 2009 Gräppås Junior Open, Skandia Tour Riks #4 - Göteborg
- 2013 Peggy Kirk Bell Invitational
- 2017 European Ladies' Team Championship (individual medalist)

== Team appearances ==
Amateur

- European Ladies' Team Championship (representing Sweden): 2013, 2014, 2015, 2016, 2017
- Spirit International Amateur (representing Sweden): 2013, 2015
