= Flommen Ladies Open =

Tournament information
- Location: Vellinge, Sweden
- Established: 2017
- Course: Flommen Golf Club
- Par: 72
- Tour: Swedish Golf Tour
- Format: 54-hole stroke play
- Prize fund: SEK 100,000
- Final year: 2019

Tournament record score
- Aggregate: 214 Isabella Ramsay (2018); 214 Moa Folke (2018); 214 Louise Markvardsen (2018)
- To par: −2 as above

Final champion
- (Sweden) Sara Ericsson (a)

The Flommen Ladies Open was a women's professional golf tournament on the Swedish Golf Tour, played between 2017 and 2019. It was always held at Flommen Golf Club in Falsterbo, Sweden.

== Winners ==
Year	Winner	Score	Margin of victory	Runner(s)-up	Prize fund (SEK)	Ref
Hoya Ladies Open
2019	(Sweden) Sara Ericsson (a)	−1 (70-77-68=215)	2 strokes	(Denmark) Louise Markvardsen (a)	100,000	
Carpe Diem Beds Open
2018	(Sweden) Isabella Ramsay	−2 (69-73-72=214)	Playoff	(Sweden) Moa Folke (Denmark) Louise Markvardsen	100,000	
Flommen Ladies Open
2017	(Sweden) Filippa Möörk	−1 (68-72-75=215)	4 strokes	(Sweden) Sofie Bringner	100,000	
