= Sophie Lamb =

English professional golfer (born 1997)

Personal information
- Nationality: England
- Born: 26 November 1997 (age 28) Blackburn, Lancashire, England
- Spouse: Marco Penge (m. 2023)
- Children: 2

Career
- Sport: Golf
- Turned professional: 2018
- Former tour: LET Access Series (joined 2019)
- Professional wins: 1

Best results in LPGA major championships
- Chevron Championship: DNP
- Women's PGA C'ship: DNP
- U.S. Women's Open: DNP
- Women's British Open: T30: 2017
- Evian Championship: DNP

Achievements and awards
- England Golf Women's Order of Merit: 2016

Sophie Lamb (born 26 November 1997) is an English professional golfer. She won the 2016 Ladies' British Open Amateur Stroke Play Championship and the Smyth Salver as low amateur at the 2017 Women's British Open.

== Amateur career ==
Lamb enjoyed a successful amateur career. In 2013, Lamb reached the quarterfinals of the 2013 Girls Amateur Championship and won the Fairhaven Trophy. She became the first girls' champion to successfully defend her Fairhaven title in 2014.

Lamb won the 2016 Ladies' British Open Amateur Stroke Play Championship, two strokes ahead of Chloe Williams, and topped the 2016 England Golf Women's Order of Merit.

She was runner-up at the 2015 Annika Invitational Europe, the 2017 Irish Women's Amateur Open Championship, the 2018 English Women's Amateur Championship and the 2018 Welsh Women's Open Stroke Play Championship. In the 2017 Women's British Open at Kingsbarns Golf Links, she finished tied 30th as low amateur at to win the Smyth Salver.

Lamb won the 2017 European Ladies' Team Championship in Portugal with an English team that included Gemma Clews and Alice Hewson. As a leading amateur, she appeared for England in the 2018 Espirito Santo Trophy and Great Britain and Ireland in the 2018 Curtis Cup.

== Professional career ==
Lamb turned professional in 2018 and joined the 2019 LET Access Series. After only four Ladies European Tour starts in 2022, she announced her retirement from tour golf in June, following the Ladies Italian Open.

== Personal life ==
Lamb married professional golfer Marco Penge in July 2023, after the pair had been together since February 2015. They had a son in June 2024.

In 2016, they won the Sunningdale Foursomes together.

== Amateur wins ==
- 2013 Fairhaven Trophy
- 2014 Fairhaven Trophy
- 2016 Ladies' British Open Amateur Stroke Play Championship

== Professional wins (1) ==
=== Other wins (1) ===
- 2016 Sunningdale Foursomes (with Marco Penge)

== Team appearances ==
Amateur

- Girls Home Internationals (representing England): 2013 (winners), 2014
- Junior Vagliano Trophy (representing Great Britain & Ireland): 2013
- European Girls' Team Championship (representing England): 2013, 2014, 2015
- World Junior Girls Golf Championship (representing England): 2015, 2016
- Women's Home Internationals (representing England): 2015 (winners), 2016 (winners), 2017
- European Nations Cup – Copa Sotogrande (representing England): 2016, 2017
- Vagliano Trophy (representing Great Britain & Ireland): 2017
- European Ladies' Team Championship (representing England): 2017 (winners), 2018
- Curtis Cup (representing Great Britain & Ireland): 2018
- Espirito Santo Trophy (representing England): 2018
