= Prasco Charity Championship =

Golf tournament in Ohio

Tournament information
- Location: Cincinnati, Ohio
- Established: 2018
- Course(s): TPC River's Bend
- Par: 72
- Length: 6,286 yards (5,748 m)
- Tour(s): Symetra Tour
- Format: Stroke play
- Prize fund: $175,000
- Final year: 2021

Final champion
- (England) Meghan MacLaren

The Prasco Charity Championship was a tournament on the Symetra Tour, the LPGA's developmental tour. It was a part of the Symetra Tour's schedule from 2018 to 2021. It was held at TPC River's Bend in Cincinnati, Ohio.

The title sponsor, Prasco Laboratories, is a privately held pharmaceutical company headquartered in Cincinnati.

In 2020, the tournament was postponed and then cancelled due to the COVID-19 pandemic.

== Winners ==
Year	Date	Winner	Country	Score	Margin of victory	Runner(s)-up	Purse ($)	Winner's share ($)
2021	Jun 27	Meghan MacLaren	England	207 (−9)	2 strokes	(Sweden) Linnea Johansson (China) Zhang Weiwei	175,000	26,250
2020	~~Jul 10~~ (Note: Tournament first rescheduled from Jun 26–28, then cancelled.)	No tournament					175,000	26,250
2019	Jun 30	Perrine Delacour	France	201 (−15)	7 strokes	(Thailand) Patty Tavatanakit	125,000	18,750
2018	Jul 1	Muni He	China	201 (−15)	4 strokes	(United States) Becca Huffer	100,000	15,000
