= Anna Magnusson (golfer) =

Swedish professional golfer

Personal information
- Nationality: Sweden
- Born: 1 January 1995 (age 31) Stockholm, Sweden

Career
- Sport: Golf
- College: Morehead State University
- Turned professional: 2017
- Current tour: Ladies European Tour (joined 2020)
- Former tours: LET Access Series (joined 2019); Swedish Golf Tour (joined 2017)
- Professional wins: 4

Achievements and awards
- Morehead State University Miss Eagle of the Year: 2016, 2017

Anna Magnusson (born 1 January 1995) is a Swedish professional golfer and Ladies European Tour player.

== Early life and amateur career ==
Magnusson was born in Stockholm in 1995. She started to play golf when she was nine years old, and as a teenager won five tournaments on the Skandia Tour and two on the Junior Masters Invitational junior circuits in Sweden.

She attended Morehead State University 2013–2017 and played golf with the Morehead State Eagles women's golf team in the Ohio Valley Conference (OVC). She was a four-time All-OVC First Team selection and four-time medalist. She was named Miss Eagle both as a junior and a senior, the first women's golfer to be named Miss Eagle for a second straight year.

== Professional career ==
Magnusson turned professional after she graduated in 2017 and joined the Swedish Golf Tour midway through the 2017 season. In 2018, she recorded two wins, a playoff victory against Malene Krølbøll Hansen in June and a two-stroke victory over Karoline Stormo and Filippa Möörk in July.

She joined the LET Access Series in 2019, where she recorded top-5 finishes at the Santander Golf Tour Lerma and Santander Golf Tour Lauro in 2020.

Magnusson played on the Ladies European Tour in 2021 but struggled to make an impact outside the Aramco Team Series events, where she finished tied fifth in London with Nicole Garcia and Christine Wolf. In 2022 she played on the LET Access Series where she had a consistent season with third places at the Flumserberg Ladies Open and Göteborg Ladies Open, and five further top-10 finishes. She clinched the sixth and final spot on the LETAS Order of Merit to secure an LET card for 2023.

On the 2023 Ladies European Tour, Magnusson fired an opening round of 66, 6 under par, to take the lead by two shots at the Belgian Ladies Open after the first day.

== Amateur wins ==
- 2009 Skandia Tour Distrikt SGDF Nord #1, Skandia Tour Distrikt SGDF Final
- 2010 Skandia Tour SGDF Södra #2
- 2011 Skandia Tour Regional #3 - Stockholm Norra
- 2012 Alex Norén Junior Open, Huvudstaden Junior Open, Skandia Tour Riks #1 - Skåne
- 2015 Bluegrass Fall Kickoff
- 2016 Matador Invitational, Golfweek Program Challenge, Lady Pirate Intercollegiate

== Professional wins (4) ==
=== LET Access Series wins (1) ===
No.	Date	Tournament	Winning score	To par	Margin of victory	Runner-up
1	14 Apr 2024	Terre Blanche Ladies Open	72-67-68=207	−9	1 stroke	(France) Sara Brentcheneff (a)

=== Swedish Golf Tour wins (2) ===
No.	Date	Tournament	Winning score	To par	Margin of victory	Runner(s)-up
1	17 Jun 2018	Hinton Golf Open	69-71-73=213	−3	Playoff	(Denmark) Malene Krølbøll Hansen (a)
2	14 Jul 2018	Johannesberg Ladies Open	69-68-70=207	−9	2 strokes	(Sweden) Filippa Möörk (Norway) Karoline Stormo

=== Other wins (1) ===
- 2020 Stockholm District Championship (SGF Golf Ranking)
