= 2019 Swedish Golf Tour (women) =

34th season of the Swedish Golf Tour (women)

2019 Swedish Golf Tour season
- Duration: May 2019 – September 2019
- Number of official events: 12
- Most wins: 2 wins: (Norway) Tonje Daffinrud
- Order of Merit winner: (Norway) Tonje Daffinrud

The 2019 Swedish Golf Tour was the 34th season of the Swedish Golf Tour, a series of professional golf tournaments for women held in Sweden and Norway.

A number of the tournaments also featured on the 2019 LET Access Series (LETAS).

== Schedule ==
The season consisted of 12 tournaments played between May and September, where one event was held in Norway.

| Date | Tournament | Venue | Winner | Runner(s)-up | Purse (SEK) | Tour | Ref |
|---|---|---|---|---|---|---|---|
| 12 May | Hinton Golf Open | Hinton Sofiedal | (Sweden) Filippa Möörk | (Sweden) Mimmi Bergman | 100,000 | | |
| 26 May | Tegelberga Open | Tegelberga | (Sweden) Moa Folke | (Sweden) Linn Grant (a) (Sweden) Emma Svensson | 100,000 | | |
| 9 Jun | Hoya Ladies Open | Flommen | (Sweden) Sara Ericsson (a) | (Denmark) Louise Markvardsen (a) | 100,000 | | |
| 15 Jun | Skaftö Open | Skaftö | (Germany) Esther Henseleit | (Sweden) Lynn Carlsson | €50,000 | LETAS | |
| 20 Jun | Åhus Open | Kristianstad | (Sweden) Michaela Finn | (Sweden) Sara Kjellker (a) | 130,000 | | |
| 30 Jun | Erlandsson Hagge Ladies Open | Hagge | (Sweden) Emelie Borggren | (Sweden) Hanna Åhlander (a) (Sweden) Amanda Jakobsson | 100,000 | | |
| 4 Jul | Moss & Rygge Open | Moss & Rygge, Norway | (Norway) Tonje Daffinrud | (Sweden) Michaela Finn | 375,000 | | |
| 10 Aug | Anna Nordqvist Västerås Open | Västerås | (Sweden) Annelie Sjöholm | (Sweden) Maja Stark (a) | €35,000 | LETAS | |
| 18 Aug | Johannesberg Open | Johannesberg | (Sweden) Louisa Carlbom (a) | (Sweden) Josefine Nyqvist | 150,000 | | |
| 31 Aug | Scandic PGA Championship | Allerum | (Norway) Tonje Daffinrud | (Sweden) Johanna Gustavsson (Sweden) Maja Stark (a) | €42,000 | LETAS | |
| 7 Sep | SM Match | Österåker | (Sweden) Emma Svensson | (Sweden) Jessica Karlsson | 400,000 | | |
| 27 Sep | Lindbytvätten Masters | Ekerum | (Sweden) Amanda Linnér (a) | (Sweden) Amanda Lindahl | 100,000 | | |

Swedish PGA Championship
Swedish Matchplay Championship

== See also ==
- 2019 Swedish Golf Tour (men's tour)
