= Women's Amateur Asia-Pacific =

Tournament information
- Location: Asia
- Established: 2018
- Organized by: The R&A
- Format: Stroke play, 72 holes
- Month played: February

Current champion
- (South Korea) Yang Yun-seo

The Women's Amateur Asia-Pacific was founded in 2018 by The R&A and the Asia-Pacific Golf Confederation, to create an event corresponding to The Women's Amateur Championship and U.S. Women's Amateur for Asia, analogous to the Asia-Pacific Amateur Championship for men. It was one of the "elite" tournaments in the World Amateur Golf Ranking.

The winner earns invitations to play in two major championships – the Women's British Open and The Evian Championship, as well as an exemption for the Augusta National Women's Amateur.

== Winners ==
Year	Player	Score	Margin of victory	Runner(s)-up	Venue
2026	(South Korea) Yang Yun-seo	272 (−16)	8 strokes	(South Korea) Oh Soo-min	Royal Wellington Golf Club, New Zealand
2025	(Malaysia) Jeneath Wong	266 (−18)	1 stroke	(South Korea) Oh Soo-min	Hoiana Shores Golf Club, Vietnam
2024	(Taiwan) Wu Chun-wei	270 (−18)	2 strokes	(South Korea) Lee Hyo-song	Siam Country Club, Thailand
2023	(Thailand) Eila Galitsky	274 (−14)	5 strokes	(South Korea) Kim Min-sol	Singapore Island Country Club, Singapore
2022	(Taiwan) Huang Ting-hsuan	277 (−11)	2 strokes	(Thailand) Natthakritta Vongtaveelap	Siam Country Club, Thailand
2021	(Japan) Mizuki Hashimoto	272 (−16)	1 stroke	(Australia) Kelsey Bennett (Thailand) Kan Bunnabodee (Thailand) Natthakritta Vongtaveelap	Abu Dhabi Golf Club, UAE
2020	Tournament cancelled due to the COVID-19 pandemic.				
2019	(Japan) Yuka Yasuda	277 (−11)	8 strokes	(Thailand) Atthaya Thitikul	The Royal Golf Club, Japan
2018	(Thailand) Atthaya Thitikul	276 (−8)	Playoff	(New Zealand) Wenyung Keh (Japan) Yuna Nishimura (Philippines) Yuka Saso	Sentosa Golf Club, Singapore
