= 2018 Espirito Santo Trophy =

Tournament information
- Dates: 29 August – 1 September
- Location: Maynooth, County Kildare, Ireland; 53.390°N 6.566°W
- Courses: Carton House Golf Club (Montgomerie and O'Meara Courses)
- Organized by: International Golf Federation
- Format: 72 holes stroke play

Statistics
- Par: Montgomerie: 72; O'Meara: 73
- Length: Montgomerie: 6,365 yards (5,820 m); O'Meara: 6,336 yards (5,794 m)
- Field: 57 teams 170 players

Champion
- United States; Kristen Gillman, Jennifer Kupcho, Lilia Vu
- 551 (−29)
- Location in the British Isles Location in the Republic of Ireland

The 2018 Espirito Santo Trophy took place 29 August – 1 September at Carton House Golf Club on its Montgomerie and O'Meara courses in Maynooth, County Kildare, Ireland.

It was the 28th women's golf World Amateur Team Championship for the Espirito Santo Trophy.

The tournament was a 72-hole stroke play team event. There were a record 57 team entries, each with two or three players. One nation, Lebanon, made its first appearance.

Each team played two rounds at the Montgomerie Course and two rounds at the O'Meara Course in different orders. The top 27 teams on the final leaderboard, except Norway and France, all played the fourth round at the O'Meara Course. The best two scores for each round counted towards the team total.

The United States team won the Trophy for their 14th title and first win in 20 years, beating team Japan by 10 strokes. Japan earned the silver medal while the defending champions South Korea team took the bronze on third place one more stroke back.

The individual title went to Cho Ayean, South Korea, whose score of 17-under-par, 273, was two strokes ahead of Jennifer Kupcho, United States, and Yuka Yasuda, Japan.

== Teams ==
59 teams entered the event and completed the competition. Each team, except one, had three players. The team representing Lithuania had only two players.

Country	Players
Argentina	Ela Anacona, Valentina Rossi, Magdalena Simmermacher
Australia	Kirsty Hodgkins, Rebecca Kay, Grace Kim
Austria	Leonie Bettel, Janika Ruettimann, Emma Spitz
Belgium	Clara Aveling, Clarisse Louis, Elodie Van Dievoet
Brazil	Laura Helena de Araujo Caetano, Maria Fernanda Lacaz Martins, Lauren Grinberg
Bulgaria	Magdalena Borisova, Stefani Skokanska, Ivana Simeonova
Canada	Naomi Ko, Jaclyn Lee, Maddie Szeryk
Czech Republic	Sara Kouskova, Hana Ryskova, Katerina Vlasinova
Chile	Antonia Matte, Sofia Morgan, Natalia Villavicencio
China	Du Mohan, Liu Wenbo, Yin Ruoning
Chinese Taipei	Huang Yu-ping, Lin Kuan-yu, Lin Tze-han
Colombia	Silvia Margarita Garces Escalante, Valentina Giraldo Roys, Maria Camila Serrano Silva
Denmark	Sofie Kibsgaard Nielsen, Malene Krølbøll Hansen, Karen Svanholm Fredgaard
Dominican Republic	Brenda Corrie-Kuehn, Yae Eun Kim, Rachel Kuehn
England	Annabell Fuller, Sophie Lamb, Hollie Muse
Finland	Anna Backman, Kiira Riihijärvi, Elina Saksa
France	Emma Broze, Agathe Laisné, Pauline Roussin-Bouchard
Germany	Leonie Harm, Sophie Hausmann, Esther Henseleit
Guam	Rachael Peterson, Rose Tarpley, Nalathai Vongjalorn
Guatemala	Beatriz Arenas, Pilar Echeverria, Valeria Mendizabal Riepele
Hong Kong	Michelle Cheung, Mimi Ho, Isabella Leung
Iceland	Helga Kristin Einarsdóttir, Ragnhildur Kristinsdóttir, Saga Traustadóttir
India	Diksha Dagar, Ridhima Dilawari, Sifat Sagoo
Ireland	Olivia Mehaffey, Paula Grant, Annabel Wilson
Italy	Caterina Don, Alessia Nobilio, Emilie Alba Paltrinieri
Japan	Yuna Nishimura, Yuka Yasuda, Yuri Yoshida
Latvia	Katrina Jana Gustafssone, Marija Luize Jucmane, Anna Estere Marksa
Lebanon	Lea Assaf, Sarah Assaf, Vanessa Richani
Lithuania	Saule Jarasunaite, Gile Bite Starkute
Malaysia	Liyana Azizan Durisic, Siti Zulaikhaa Shaari, Geraldine Xiao Xuan Wong
Mexico	María Fassi, Cory Lopez, Ana Lizeth Ruiz Laphond
Morocco	Lina Belmati, Ines Laklalech, Intissar Rich
Netherlands	Zhen Bontan, Romy Meekers, Dewi Weber
New Zealand	Julianne Alvarez, Amelia Garvey, Wenyung Keh
Norway	Dorthea Forbrigd, Renate Grimstad, Karoline Stormo
Paraguay	Maria Fernanda Escauriza Stoeckl, Sofia García, Anahi Servin
Peru	Daniela Ballesteros, Micaela Farah, Josefina Fernandez-Davila
Poland	Dominika Gradecka, Nicole Polivchak, Dorota Zalewska
Portugal	Sofia Barroso Sa, Leonor Bessa, Sara Gouveia
Puerto Rico	Valeria Pacheco Claudio, Johany Rivera, Yudika Ann Rodriguez
Scotland	Connie Jaffrey, Hannah McCook, Shannon McWilliam
Singapore	Callista Chen, Inez Xin Yi Ng, Shannon Tan
Slovakia	Anika Bolcikova, Katarina Drocarova, Natalia Heckova
Slovenia	Inja Fric, Lara Jecnik, Vida Obersnel
South Africa	Caitlyn Macnab, Kajal Mistry, Kaleigh Telfer
South Korea	Cho Ayean, Hong Yae-eun, Kwon Seo-yun
Spain	Elena Hualde Zuniga, Paz Marfa Sans, Marta Perez Sanmartin
Sweden	Linn Grant, Frida Kinhult, Beatrice Wallin
Switzerland	Yael Berger, Elena Moosmann, Albane Valenzuela
Thailand	Napabhach Boon-In, Tunrada Piddon, Rina Tatematsu
Tunisia	Kenza Ladhari, Hedia Mansouri, Ghozlene Saki
Turkey	Damla Bilgic, Sena Ersoy, Selin Timur
Ukraine	Daria Horokhovska, Elvira Rastvortseva, Valeriia Sapronova
United States	Kristen Gillman, Jennifer Kupcho, Lilia Vu
Uruguay	Sofia Garcia Austt Marques, Jimena Marques, Priscilla Schmid
Venezuela	Claudia De Antonio, Valentina Gilly, Ana Raga
Wales	Bethan Morris, Katherine O'Connor, Jordan Ryan

== Results ==
Place	Country	Score	To par
1st place, gold medalist(s)	United States	142-130-143-136=551	−29
2nd place, silver medalist(s)	Japan	136-139-146-140=561	−19
3rd place, bronze medalist(s)	South Korea	140-133-147-142=562	−18
4	China	140-139-152-135=566	−14
5	Germany	142-141-148-138=569	−11
6	Italy	143-142-146-139=570	−10
7	Canada	154-139-143-137=573	−7
T8	Denmark	147-140-147-140=574	−6
T8	Mexico	147-141-145-141=574	−6
10	Norway	150-148-140-137=575	−5
T11	Ireland	141-147-142-146=576	−4
T11	Sweden	147-142-147-140=576	−4
T11	Switzerland	147-145-143-141=576	−4
14	Australia	141-148-149-139=577	−3
T15	Austria	142-141-149-146=578	−2
T15	South Africa	150-144-145-139=578	−2
17	Spain	152-137-149-141=579	−1
18	England	149-141-149-142=581	+1
19	New Zealand	148-143-146-145=582	+2
T20	France	148-149-141-145=583	+3
T20	Paraguay	149-141-148-145=583	+3
22	Chinese Taipei	153-141-148-142=584	+4
23	Netherlands	147-143-150-145=585	+5
24	Scotland	148-141-155-142=586	+6
T25	India	151-140-153-143=587	+7
T25	Venezuela	145-151-151-140=587	+7
27	Thailand	147-139-156-146=588	+8
28	Puerto Rico	150-151-145-143=589	+9
29	Colombia	154-142-154-140=590	+10
30	Argentina	152-150-144-145=591	+11
T31	Belgium	147-142-156-147=592	+12
T31	Czech Republic	150-148-147-147=592	+12
T31	Finland	148-145-157-142=592	+12
34	Hong Kong	144-149-159-141=593	+13
35	Dominican Republic	148-149-148-151=596	+16
36	Guatemala	150-147-160-141=598	+18
T37	Malaysia	154-145-146-156=601	+21
T37	Morocco	150-149-148-154=601	+21
39	Iceland	155-148-151-149=603	+23
T40	Peru	157-151-147-151=606	+26
T40	Portugal	158-144-152-152=606	+26
42	Chile	144-149-159-145=607	+27
43	Slovenia	160-144-151-153=608	+28
44	Uruguay	154-154-151-152=611	+31
45	Wales	157-149-153-153=612	+32
46	Slovakia	157-153-151-153=614	+34
47	Turkey	161-155-149-151=616	+36
48	Poland	159-148-156-157=620	+40
49	Singapore	158-153-155-156=622	+42
50	Brazil	154-165-158-152=629	+49
51	Lithuania	155-158-157-163=633	+53
52	Latvia	165-155-156-174=650	+70
53	Guam	162-163-162-169=656	+76
54	Bulgaria	165-163-163-170=661	+81
55	Tunisia	168-164-170-169=671	+91
56	Ukraine	169-175-167-170=681	+101
57	Lebanon	168-173-171-172=684	+104

== Individual leaders ==
There was no official recognition for the lowest individual scores.

Place	Player	Country	Score	To par
1	Cho Ayean	South Korea	68-64-71-70=273	−17
2	Jennifer Kupcho	United States	70-65-71-69=275	−15
2	Yuka Yasuda	Japan	65-67-72-71=275	−15
4	Kristen Gillman	United States	74-65-72-67=278	−12
5	Jaclyn Lee	Canada	76-69-72-65=282	−8
T6	Esther Henseleit	Germany	72-70-75-66=283	−7
T6	Rebecca Kay	Australia	68-74-73-68=283	−7
T8	Mohan Du	China	67-71-79-68=285	−5
T8	María Fassi	Mexico	74-69-71-71=285	−5
T8	Alessia Nobilio	Italy	73-68-76-68=285	−5
T8	Albane Valenzuela	Switzerland	73-71-71-70=285	−5
