= Tegelberga Open =

Women's professional golf tournament in Sweden

Tournament information
- Location: Trelleborg, Sweden
- Established: 2018
- Course: Tegelberga Golf Club
- Par: 71/72
- Tours: LET Access Series; Swedish Golf Tour
- Format: Stroke play
- Prize fund: €50,000
- Month played: August

Tournament record score
- Aggregate: 205 Elin Arvidsson, Maja Stark
- To par: −8 as above

Current champion
- (Sweden) Meja Örtengren (a)

Location map
- Location in Europe

The Tegelberga Open is a women's professional golf tournament on the Swedish Golf Tour and LET Access Series, played since 2018 at Tegelberga Golf Club in Trelleborg, Sweden.

The 2020, 2021 and 2022 editions were played as part of the Swedish PGA Championship series.

== Winners ==
Year	Tours	Winner	Score	Margin of victory	Runner-up	Prize fund (SEK)	Ref
PGA Championship by Trelleborgs Kommun
2022	SGT · LETAS	(Sweden) Meja Örtengren (a)	−2 (69-74-68=211)	Playoff	(Netherlands) Zhen Bontan	€50,000	
2021	SGT · LETAS	(Sweden) Maja Stark	−8 (67-70-68=205)	1 stroke	(England) Lily May Humphreys	€50,000	
2020	SGT · ~~LETAS~~ (Note: Removed from the LETAS schedule and had its purse reduced due to the COVID-19 pandemic.)	(Sweden) Elin Arvidsson	−8 (70-69-66=205)	2 strokes	(Sweden) Linda Lundqvist	~~€40,000~~; 250,000	
Tegelberga Open
2019	SGT	(Sweden) Moa Folke	−7 (67-72-70=209)	6 strokes	(Sweden) Linn Grant (a) (Sweden) Emma Svensson	100,000	
2018	SGT	(Sweden) Filippa Möörk	−3 (67-73-70=210)	3 strokes	(Sweden) Linda Wessberg	100,000	
