= Malene Krølbøll Hansen =

Danish professional golfer (born 1995)

Personal information
- Nationality: Denmark
- Born: 1995 (age 30–31) Copenhagen, Denmark

Career
- Sport: Golf
- College: Coastal Carolina University
- Turned professional: 2018
- Former tour: Symetra Tour (2019–2022)
- Professional wins: 1

Achievements and awards
- Big South Freshman of the Year: 2015
- Sun Belt Player of the Year: 2017, 2018

Malene Krølbøll Hansen (born 1995) is a Danish former professional golfer who played on the Symetra Tour.

== Amateur career ==
Krølbøll played for the National Team and represented Denmark in two European Girls' Team Championships and six European Ladies' Team Championships between 2011 and 2018, with best result a bronze medal in 2012. She finished 4th at the 2016 Espirito Santo Trophy and 8th at the 2018 Espirito Santo Trophy.

In 2013, she won the Annika Invitational Europe and played in the Ladies European Tour event the Helsingborg Open in Sweden, and made the cut.

Krølbøll was a member of the Coastal Carolina University women's golf program from 2014 to 2018. Krølbøll was Big South Freshman of the Year in 2015, and after the school's move to the Sun Belt Conference, she was named the Sun Belt Conference Player of the Year in both 2017 and 2018. She won four individual titles including the 2018 Sun Belt Championship. Krølbøll had the greatest women's golf career in school history, and earned a degree in marketing.

In June 2018, Krølbøll played two tournaments on the Swedish Golf Tour. She lost a playoff at the Hinton Golf Open to Anna Magnusson, but the following week won the Skaftö Open, 4 strokes ahead of Filippa Möörk.

== Professional career ==
Krølbøll turned professional in September 2018 and joined the 2019 Symetra Tour. In her rookie season, she made ten cuts in 18 events, and finished 84th in the ranking after a season best T8 at the Four Winds Invitational.

In a pandemic-reduced 2020 season, she made every cut in eight starts, and finished 27th in the ranking. She recorded two top-10 finishes including a season-best T9 result at the Symetra Tour Championship.

Krølbøll retired from tour following the 2022 season and returned to Copenhagen from Myrtle Beach, South Carolina for a career in marketing.

== Amateur wins ==
- 2011 Norberg Open
- 2012 Norberg Open, Junior Masters Invitational, Vejlematchen
- 2013 Norberg Open, Nordea Furesopokalen, Annika Invitational Europe
- 2014 Wiibroe Cup, Schyberg Junior Open
- 2015 DGU Elite Tour III
- 2016 Wiibroe Cup, Golfweek Conference Challenge, Danish International Ladies Amateur Championship
- 2017 Wiibroe Cup, Ladies Fall Intercollegiate
- 2018 Charleston Invitational, Sun Belt Conference Tournament, Danish International Ladies Amateur Championship

== Professional wins (1) ==
=== Swedish Golf Tour wins (1) ===
No.	Date	Tournament	Winning score	To par	Margin of victory	Runner-up	Ref
1	21 Jun 2018	Skaftö Open (as an amateur)	67-68-65=200	−7	4 strokes	(Sweden) Filippa Möörk	

Swedish Golf Tour playoff record (0–1)

No.	Year	Tournament	Opponent	Result
1	2018	Hinton Golf Open	(Sweden) Anna Magnusson	Lost to par on first extra hole

== Team appearances ==
Amateur

- European Girls' Team Championship (representing Denmark): 2011, 2012
- European Ladies' Team Championship (representing Denmark): 2013, 2014, 2015, 2016, 2017, 2018
- Espirito Santo Trophy (representing Denmark): 2016, 2018
