= Danielle Downey Credit Union Classic =

Tournament information
- Location: Gates, New York
- Established: 2015
- Course: Brook-Lea Country Club
- Par: 72
- Length: 6,406 yards (5,858 m)
- Tour: Symetra Tour
- Format: Stroke play
- Prize fund: $175,000
- Final year: 2021

Tournament record score
- Aggregate: 266 Nanna Koerstz Madsen (2017)
- To par: −22 as above

Final champion
- (France) Emma Broze

The Danielle Downey Credit Union Classic was an event on the Symetra Tour, the LPGA's developmental tour. It a part of the Symetra Tour's schedule from 2015 to 2021. It aws held at Brook-Lea Country Club, designed by Donald Ross, outside Rochester, New York.

The tournament was created to honor the legacy of Danielle Downey a native of the Rochester area who played on the LPGA Tour and died in 2014. Prior to the Danielle Downey Classic, Rochester was home to the LPGA Tour's Wegmans LPGA for more than thirty years. The tournament was a 72-hole event, unlike most Symetra Tour tournaments which are 54-holes.

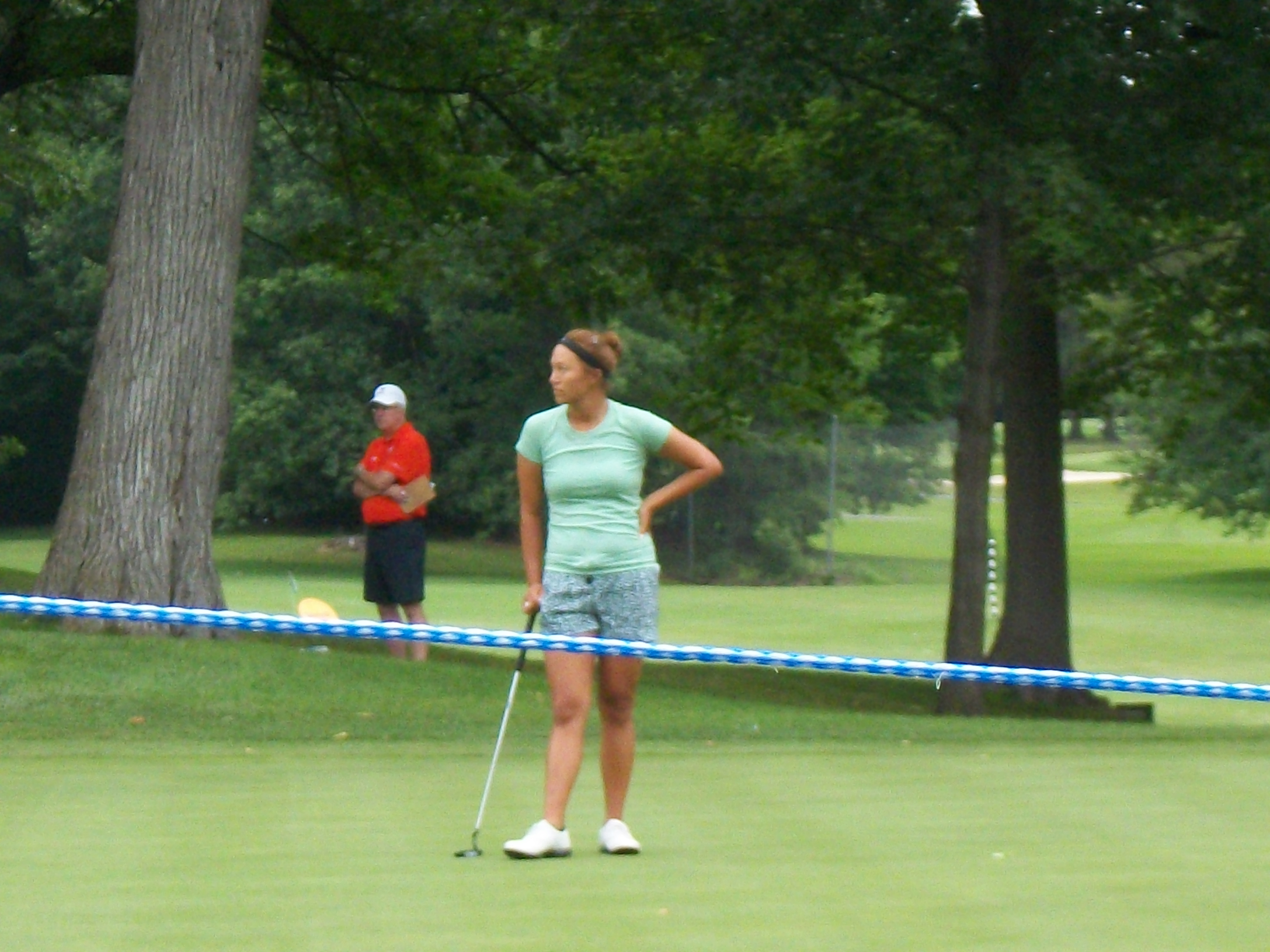
Annie Parks on the 18th green at the 2015 Toyota Danielle Downey Classic.

== Winners ==
Year	Date	Champion	Country	Score	Purse ($)	Winner's share ($)
Danielle Downey Credit Union Classic
2021	Jul 18	Emma Broze	France	132 (−8)	175,000	26,250
2020	Tournament cancelled					
2019	Jul 21	Patty Tavatanakit	Thailand	268 (−20)	175,000	26,250
2018	Jul 22	Seong Eun-jeong	South Korea	276 (−12)	150,000	22,500
2017	Jul 23	Nanna Koerstz Madsen	Denmark	266 (−22)	150,000	22,500
2016	Jul 17	Clariss Guce	Philippines	277 (−11)	200,000	30,000
Toyota Danielle Downey Classic
2015	Jul 19	Annie Park	United States	272 (−16)	150,000	22,500
