= Louise Ridderström =

Swedish professional golfer (born 1993)

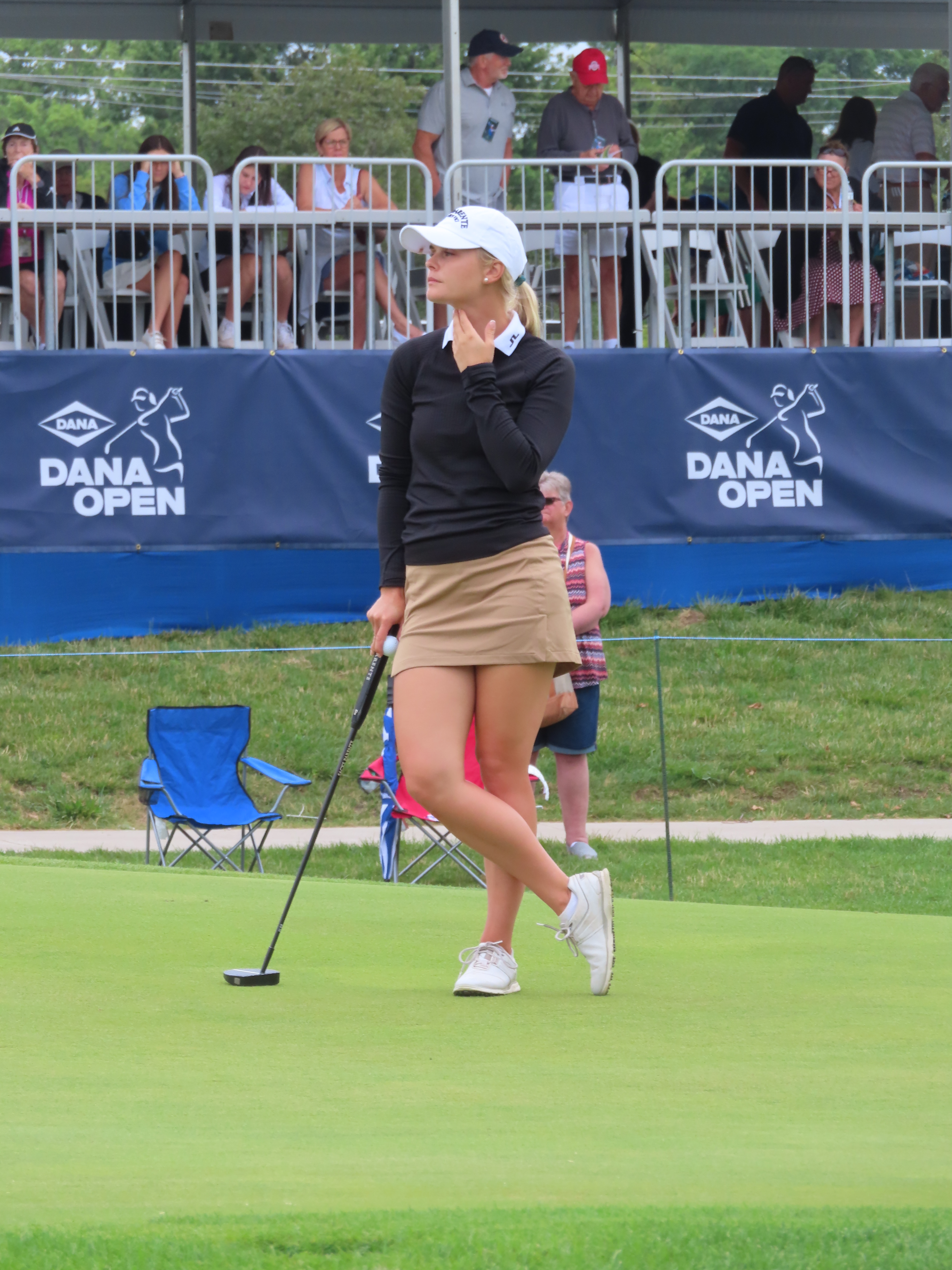

Personal information
- Full name: Louise Ridderström
- Nationality: Sweden
- Born: 24 December 1993 (age 32) Stockholm, Sweden
- Height: 1.64 m (5 ft 5 in)

Career
- Sport: Golf
- College: UCLA
- Turned professional: 2016
- Current tour: LPGA Tour (joined 2019)
- Former tour: Symetra Tour (joined 2017)
- Professional wins: 1

Number of wins by tour
- Epson Tour: 1

Best results in LPGA major championships
- Chevron Championship: DNP
- Women's PGA C'ship: CUT: 2019
- U.S. Women's Open: DNP
- Women's British Open: CUT: 2020
- Evian Championship: DNP

Achievements and awards
- PGA of Sweden Future Fund Award: 2019

Louise Ridderström (born 24 December 1993) is a Swedish professional golfer who plays on the LPGA Tour.

== Early life and amateur career ==
Ridderström was born in Stockholm to a gymnast mother and a father (sv:Lars-Erik) who was member of the Swedish National Hockey Team. She started playing golf at the age of six, and played NCAA Division 1 college golf with the UCLA Bruins women's golf team at the University of California, Los Angeles between 2012 and 2016.

An accomplished junior golfer, she was part of the Swedish National Team and finished 4th at the European Girls' Team Championship in 2010 and 5th in 2011. She appeared twice at the European Ladies' Team Championship, finishing 5th both times. In 2015, her team lost in the quarterfinal to the Swiss team which included Kim Métraux, Morgane Métraux and Albane Valenzuela. In 2016, they lost to an English team with Alice Hewson, Bronte Law and Meghan MacLaren, after Ridderström finished third individually in the stroke play.

Ridderström also represented Sweden at the 2014 Espirito Santo Trophy in Japan, where her team with Madelene Sagström and Linnea Ström tied for 5th alongside the U.S. team. She finished 3rd at the 2010 Spanish International Ladies Amateur Championship and in 2015 she was runner-up at the Swedish Matchplay Championship at Ullna Golf Club, losing the final to Camilla Lennarth 6 and 5.

== Professional career ==
Ridderström turned professional in 2016 after graduating from UCLA, and joined the Symetra Tour in 2017. On the 2018 Symetra Tour, Ridderström made 15 cuts in 20 starts, winning her first professional event at the Valley Forge Invitational and recording three additional top-10 results.

She finished T36 at the inaugural LPGA Q-Series to earn Priority List Category 14 status for the 2019 LPGA Tour where she started in 16 events and made eight cuts to rank 121st. Her best result was a tie for 18th at LPGA Mediheal Championship where she was in contention at −4 until shooting a final round of 75.

Ridderström spent 2022 on the Epson Tour, where she made 12 cuts in 18 starts with a season-best result of T5 at the Carolina Golf Classic. She secured a return to the 2023 LPGA Tour by finishing T34 at Q-Series.

== Amateur wins ==
- 2016 Bruin Wave Invitational

== Professional wins ==
=== Symetra Tour wins ===
No.	Date	Tournament	Winning score	Margin of victory	Runners-up
1	26 May 2018	Valley Forge Invitational	−16 (69-65-63=197)	4 strokes	(United States) Min-G Kim, (United States) Laura Wearn

== Team appearances ==
Amateur

- European Young Masters (representing Sweden): 2009
- European Girls' Team Championship (representing Sweden): 2010, 2011
- Espirito Santo Trophy (representing Sweden): 2014
- European Ladies' Team Championship (representing Sweden): 2015, 2016
