= Moa Folke =

Swedish professional golfer (born 1995)

Personal information
- Nationality: Sweden
- Born: 25 March 1995 (age 31) Tranås, Sweden
- Height: 5 ft 7 in (170 cm)

Career
- Sport: Golf
- College: Murray State University
- Turned professional: 2018
- Current tour: Ladies European Tour (joined 2022)
- Former tour: Symetra Tour (joined 2019)
- Professional wins: 2

Achievements and awards
- Ohio Valley Conference Golfer of the Year: 2017

Moa Folke (born 25 March 1995) is a Swedish professional golfer who plays on the Ladies European Tour. In 2023, she won the Dimension Data Ladies Pro-Am and was runner-up at the Joburg Ladies Open and the Open de France Dames.

== Early life and amateur career ==
Folke was born in Tranås in 1995 and won several tournaments on the Skandia Tour junior circuit in Sweden.

She attended Murray State University 2014–2018 and played golf with the Murray State Racers women's golf team in the Ohio Valley Conference (OVC). She was a four-time All-OVC First Team selection and five-time medalist including the 2016 and 2017 OVC Championship. She was named the Ohio Valley Conference Golfer of the Year as a junior in 2017 and guided the Racers to back-to-back NCAA Championship appearances in 2017 and 2018

== Professional career ==
Folke turned professional after she graduated in 2018. Before entering qualification for the LPGA Tour, she played in a few tournaments on the Swedish Golf Tour. She lost a playoff to Isabella Ramsay in the Carpe Diem Beds Open at Flommen Golf Club. In 2019, she won the Tegelberga Open, six strokes ahead of runner-up Linn Grant

In 2019, Folke joined the Symetra Tour. In her rookie season, she made two cuts in seven starts, her best finish a tie for 13th at the PHC Classic. With 2020 lost to the pandemic, in 2021 she made six cuts in 19 starts.

Playing in three Sunshine Ladies Tour events in early 2022, she held the lead after the first round of the Dimension Data Ladies Pro-Am, but eventually had to settle for a tie for 8th place.

Folke earned conditional status for the 2022 Ladies European Tour at Q-School. In her rookie season, she finished tied 14th at the Australian Ladies Classic – Bonville in April, and tied for 5th at the Mithra Belgian Ladies Open in May. In September, she led by two strokes at the halfway stage of the Women's Irish Open after firing a second round 62, ten under par. A final round 73 saw her finish tied 14th, five shots behind winner Klára Spilková.

In 2023, Folke shot a bogey-free eight-under-par 64 final round to win the Dimension Data Ladies Pro-Am in South Africa three strokes ahead of Anne-Lise Caudal. A few weeks later, she finished runner-up at the Joburg Ladies Open, after she held the lead by two strokes ahead of the final round. Folke finished solo runner-up behind compatriot Johanna Gustavsson at the Open de France Dames. She was only a shot back until Gustavsson holed-out for an eagle at the par-4 13th from 112 meters, and finished three shots behind. She finished the season 21st in the LET Order of Merit.

In 2024, Folke finished 38th in the Order of Merit, after recording a single top-5 finish of the season at the Ladies Swiss Open. In 2025, she finished top-5 at the Women's NSW Open and held a two stroke solo lead after firing an opening round of 64 (–7) at the Jabra Ladies Open, ultimately tying for 17th.

Folke was tied for the lead ahead of the final round of the 2026 Ladies Italian Open alongside Alexandra Försterling and Casandra Alexander and ultimately tied for 5th, five strokes behind winner Alexander.

== Amateur wins ==
- 2012 Skandia Tour Riks #3 Örebro, McDonald's Junior Trophy
- 2013 Skandia Tour Riks #3 Halland
- 2016 Jan Weaver Invitational, Ohio Valley Conference Championship, Skandia Tour Riks #2 Stockholm, Chris Banister Classic
- 2017 Jan Weaver Invitational, Ohio Valley Conference Championship

== Professional wins (2) ==
=== Sunshine Ladies Tour wins (1) ===
No.	Date	Tournament	Winning score	To par	Margin of victory	Runner-up	Ref
1	12 Feb 2023	Dimension Data Ladies Pro-Am	71-73-64=208	−8	3 strokes	(France) Anne-Lise Caudal	

=== Swedish Golf Tour wins (1) ===
No.	Date	Tournament	Winning score	To par	Margin of victory	Runners-up	Ref
1	26 May 2019	Tegelberga Open	67-72-70=209	–7	6 strokes	(Sweden) Linn Grant (a) (Sweden) Emma Svensson	
