= 2017 European Ladies' Team Championship =

Golf competition

Tournament information
- Dates: 11–15 July 2017
- Location: Palmela, Portugal; 38°34′11″N 8°48′11″W
- Course: Montado Golf Resort
- Organized by: European Golf Association
- Format: 36 holes stroke play Knock-out match-play

Statistics
- Par: 72
- Length: 6,068 yards (5,549 m)
- Field: 19 teams 114 players

Champion
- England; Lianna Bailey, Gemma Clews, India Clyburn, Alice Hewson, Sophie Lamb, Rochelle Morris
- Qualification round: 707 (−13); Final match 4–3

Location map
- Location in Europe Location in Portugal

The 2017 European Ladies' Team Championship took place 11–15 July at Montado Golf Resort in Palmela, Portugal. It was the 34th women's golf amateur European Ladies' Team Championship.

== Venue ==
The hosting course, located in the Lisboa Region and Setúbal District, about 25 kilometres south of Lisbon, Portugal, opened in 1992, surrounded by vineyards and with an island green on the 18th hole, was designed by Jorge Santana da Silva.

The championship course was set up with par 72.

== Format ==
All participating teams played two qualification rounds of stroke-play with six players, counted the five best scores for each team.

The eight best teams formed flight A, in knock-out match-play over the next three days. The teams were seeded based on their positions after the stroke-play. The first placed team was drawn to play the quarter final against the eight placed team, the second against the seventh, the third against the sixth and the fourth against the fifth. In each match between two nation teams, two 18-hole foursome games and five 18-hole single games were played. Teams were allowed to switch players during the team matches, selecting other players in to the afternoon single games after the morning foursome games. Teams knocked out after the quarter finals played one foursome game and four single games in each of their remaining matches. Games all square after 18 holes were declared halved, if the team match was already decided.

The eight teams placed 9–16 in the qualification stroke-play formed flight B, to play similar knock-out match-play, with one foursome game and four single games, to decide their final positions.

The three teams placed 17–19 in the qualification stroke-play formed flight C, to meet each other, with one foursome game and four single games, to decide their final positions.

== Teams ==
19 nation teams contested the event. Each team consisted of six players.

Players in the teams

Country	Players
Austria	Leonie Bettel, Ines Fendt, Florentina Hager, Katharina Muehlbauer, Julia Unterweger, Lea Zeitler
Belgium	Margaux Appart, Diane Baillieux Charlotte De Corte, Clarisse Louis, Céline Manche, Elodie Van Dievoet
Czech Republic	Kristina Frydlova, Hana Ryskova, Frantiska Lunackova, Tereza Melecka, Jana Melichova, Katerina Vlasinova
Denmark	Stephanie Amalie Astrup, Cecilie Finne-Ipsen, Malene Krølbøll Hansen, Marie Lund Hansen, Puk Lyng Thomsen, Sofie Kibsgaard Nielsen
England	Lianna Bailey, Gemma Clews, India Clyburn, Alice Hewson, Sophie Lamb, Rochelle Morris
Finland	Karina Kukkonen, Hannele Mikkola, Ellinoora Moisio, Kiira Riihijarvi, Petra Salko, Emilia Tukiainen
France	Shannon Aubert, Mathilda Cappeliez, Emma Grechi, Manon Molle, Chloe Salort, Marion Veysseyre
Germany	Antonia Eberhard, Laura Fünfstück, Leonie Harm, Sophie Hausmann, Anastasia Mickan, Sophia Zeeb
Iceland	Guðrún Bra Björgvinsdóttir, Berglind Björnsdóttir, Helga Kristín Einarsdóttir, Ragnhildur Kristinsdóttir, Anna Sólveig Snorradóttir, Saga Traustadóttir
Ireland	Maria Dunne, Paula Grant, Julie McCarthy, Olivia Mehaffey, Chloe Ryan, Sinead Sexton
Italy	Bianca Maria Fabrizio, Roberta Liti, Clara Manzalini, Angelica Moresco, Carlotta Ricolfi, Tasa Torbica
Netherlands	Zhen Bontan, Myrte Eikenaar, Roos Haarman, Romy Meekers, Charlotte Puts, Dewi Weber
Norway	Celine Borge, Renate Grimstad, Karoline Lund, Stina Resen, Karoline Stormo, Marthe Wold
Portugal	Leonor Bessa, Sofia Barroso Sá, Sara Gouveia, Leonor Medeiros, Joana Mota, Beatriz Themudo
Scotland	Eilidh Briggs, Chloe Goadby, Connie Jaffrey, Hannah McCook, Shannon McWilliam, Clara Young
Slovakia	Anika Bolcikova, Natália Heckova, Rebecca Hnidková, Alexandra Patáková, Johanka Steindleroa, Sara Zrniková
Spain	Celia Barquín Arozamena, Elena Hualde Zuniga, Ana Peláez, Lee Ha-rang, Ainhoa Olarra Mujika, Marta Perez Sanmartin
Sweden	Elin Esborn, Michaela Finn, Linnea Johansson, My Leander, Filippa Möörk, Linnea Ström
Switzerland	Rachel Rossel,, Natalie Armbruester, Albane Valenzuela, Vanessa Knecht, Charlotte Alran, Gioia Carpinelli

== Winners ==
Seven times champions Sweden lead the opening 36-hole qualifying competition, with a score of 20 under par 700, four strokes ahead of team Italy.

Individual leader in the 36-hole stroke-play competition was Linnea Johansson, Sweden, with a score of 9 under par 135, two strokes ahead of four players on tied second place.

Defending champions England won the championship, beating Italy 4–3 in the final and earned their tenth title. Italy's silver was their first medal ever in the history of the championship.

Team Sweden earned third place, beating Spain 4 1/2–2 1/2 in the bronze match.

== Results ==
Qualification round

Team standings

Place	Country	Score	To par
1	Sweden	350-350=700	−20
2	Italy	352-352=704	−16
3	Spain	361-344=705	−15
4	England	351-356=707	−13
5	Germany	354-354=708	−12
6	Denmark	363-353=716	−4
7	Netherlands	356-364=720	E
8	Belgium	363-358=721	+1
9	Scotland	364-359=723	+3
10	Ireland	367-357=724	+4
11	Norway	357-369=726	+6
12	France	374-355=729	+9
13	Switzerland	363-370=733	+13
14	Czech Republic	376-363=739	+19
15	Slovakia	370-370=740	+20
16	Austria	377-371=748	+28
17	Finland	373-381=754	+34
18	Iceland	383-375=758	+38
19	Portugal	384-381=765	+45

Individual leaders

Place	Player	Country	Score	To par
1	Linnea Johansson	Sweden	67-68=135	−9
T2	Celia Barquín Arozamena	Spain	70-67=137	−7
T2	Clara Manzalini	Italy	71-66=137	−7
T2	Linnea Ström	Sweden	67-70=137	−7
T2	Dewi Weber	Netherlands	66-71=137	−7
T6	Antonia Eberhard	Germany	69-69=138	−6
T6	Clarisse Louis	Belgium	70-68=138	−6
T6	Tasa Torbica	Italy	69-69=138	−6
T9	Shannon Aubert	France	71-68=139	−5
T9	Gemma Clews	England	68-71=139	−5
T9	Alice Hewson	England	69-70=139	−5
T9	Ana Peláez	Spain	72-67=139	−5
T9	Carlotta Ricolfi	Italy	69-70=139	−5

Note: There was no official award for the lowest individual score.

Flight A

Bracket

Quarter finals
Sweden	6
Belgium	1
England	4
Germany	3
Spain	4.5
Denmark	2.5
Italy	5
Netherlands	2

Semi finals
England	4.5
Sweden	2.5
Italy	5
Spain	2

Final
England	5.5
Italy	1.5
Bronze match
Sweden	4.5
Spain	2.5

Elimination matches
Germany	3.5
Belgium	1.5
Denmark	4
Netherlands	1

Match for 5th place
Denmark	3.5
Germany	1.5
Match for 7th place
Netherlands	3
Belgium	2

Final games

England	Italy
5.5	1.5
G. Clews / S. Lamb 4 & 2	B. Fabrizio / T. Torbica
A. Hewson / I. Clyburn 2 & 1	C. Manzalini / C. Ricolfi
Lianna Bailey 3 & 2	Clara Manzalini
Alice Hewson AS *	Carlotta Ricolfi AS *
Gemma Clews 1 hole	Angelica Moresco
India Clyburn AS *	Tasa Torbica AS *
Sophie Lamb AS *	Roberta Liti AS *

* Note: Game declared halved, since team match already decided.

Flight B

Bracket

Round 1
Scotland	4
Austria	1
France	3.5
Switzerland	1.5
Czech Republic	4
Norway	1
Ireland	4
Slovakia	1

Round 2
France	3
Scotland	2
Ireland	3.5
Czech Republic	1.5

Match for 9th place
Ireland	3.5
France	1.5
Match for 11th place
Scotland	3
Czech Republic	2

Elimination matches
Austria	4
Switzerland	1
Norway	5
Slovakia	0

Match for 13th place
Norway	3
Austria	2
Match for 15th place
Slovakia	3
Switzerland	2

Flight C

Team matches

1	Finland	Portugal	0
3		2	

1	Finland	Iceland	0
4		1	

1	Iceland	Portugal	0
3.5		1.5	

Team standings

Country	Place	W	T	L	Game points	Points
Finland	17	2	0	0	7–3	2
Iceland	18	1	0	1	4.5–5.5	1
Portugal	19	0	0	2	3.5–6.5	0

Final standings

Place	Country
1st place, gold medalist(s)	England
2nd place, silver medalist(s)	Italy
3rd place, bronze medalist(s)	Sweden
4	Spain
5	Denmark
6	Germany
7	Netherlands
8	Belgium
9	Ireland
10	France
11	Scotland
12	Czech Republic
13	Norway
14	Austria
15	Slovakia
16	Switzerland
17	Finland
18	Iceland
19	Portugal

== See also ==
- Espirito Santo Trophy – biennial world amateur team golf championship for women organized by the International Golf Federation.
- European Amateur Team Championship – European amateur team golf championship for men organised by the European Golf Association.
- European Ladies Amateur Championship – European amateur individual golf championship for women organised by the European Golf Association.
