= Line Toft Hansen =

Danish professional golfer

Personal information
- Nationality: Denmark
- Born: 31 July 1999 (age 27) Hillerød, Denmark
- Height: 5 ft 10 in (178 cm)

Career
- Sport: Golf
- Turned professional: 2019
- Current tour: Ladies European Tour (joined 2020)
- Professional wins: 1

Achievements and awards
- Swedish Golf Tour Order of Merit: 2020

Line Toft Hansen (born 31 July 1999) is a Danish professional golfer and member of the Ladies European Tour.

== Early life and amateur career ==
Hansen started playing golf in 2007, taught by her grandfather. She played at Gilleleje Golf Club, where her parents owned the restaurant, and later switched to Hillerød Golf Club. Her brother, Morten Toft Hansen, is also a professional golfer. He won the 2018 Swedish PGA Championship. In 2013, they both won the AON Junior Tour III tournament, in the girls' and boys' category respectively.

Hansen won the Finnish International Championship (U16) in 2014. She was runner-up in the team event at the 2015 World Junior Girls Championship in Canada, and finished 10th individually. She was runner-up at the 2017 Portuguese International Ladies Amateur Championship and runner-up at the 2018 Turkish International Amateur Open Championship. In 2019, she was 3rd at the German International Amateur.

== Professional career ==
Hansen turned professional in late 2019 and joined the 2020 Ladies European Tour with limited category. She started four tournaments and made two cuts. In 2021, she started more than a dozen tournaments and finished T4 in the team event at the Aramco Team Series – Sotogrande, teamed with Anne-Lise Caudal of France and Lee-Anne Pace of South Africa.

In 2020, Hansen also participated in seven tournaments on the Swedish Golf Tour over the summer, winning the Hagge Open held at Hagge Golf Club near Ludvika, Dalarna. This was enough to win the Order of Merit, albeit shared with Louise Rydqvist, and in the lesser domestic category excluding LET Access Series designated events. The main category was won by Linn Grant.

== Amateur wins ==
- 2013 AON Junior Tour III
- 2014 Finnish International Championship (U16)
- 2016 DGU Elite Tour Damer Sæsonfinalen
- 2017 Hotel Præstekilde Møn Open

== Professional wins (1) ==
=== Swedish Golf Tour wins (1) ===
No.	Date	Tournament	Winning score	To par	Margin of victory	Runner-up	Ref
1	12 Sep 2020	Hagge Open	65-74=139	−3	Playoff	(Sweden) Marina Hedlund	

== Team appearances ==
Amateur

- World Junior Girls Championship (representing Denmark): 2015
- European Ladies' Team Championship (representing Denmark): 2016
