= PLM Open =

Tournament information
- Location: Lohja, Sweden
- Established: 1983
- Course: Bokskogens Golf Club
- Par: 72
- Tours: European Tour; Swedish Golf Tour
- Format: Stroke play
- Prize fund: £350,000
- Month played: August
- Final year: 1990

Tournament record score
- Aggregate: 270 Frank Nobilo (1988); 270 Ronan Rafferty (1990)
- To par: −18 Ronan Rafferty (1990)

Final champion
- (Northern Ireland) Ronan Rafferty

Location map
- Location in Sweden

The PLM Open was a golf tournament that was played in Sweden until 1990. Founded in 1983, it was a European Tour event from 1986, and in its final year it had a prize fund of £350,000, which was mid-range for a European Tour event at that time. In 1991, the tournament was merged with the Scandinavian Enterprise Open, with the resultant tournament being called the Scandinavian Masters.

The inaugural tournament was held at Falsterbo Golf Club in May 1983, prior to the establishment of the Swedish Golf Tour, with a purse of kr 150,000. Peter Dahlberg of Bokskogen Golf Club won with rounds of 72-67-71-71.

The PLM Open should not be confused with the KLM Open, which was a sponsored name of the Dutch Open.

== Winners ==
Year	Tour (Note: EUR − European Tour; SWE − Swedish Golf Tour.)	Winner	Score	To par	Margin of victory	Runner(s)-up	Venue
1990	EUR	(Northern Ireland) Ronan Rafferty	270	−18	4 strokes	(Fiji) Vijay Singh	Bokskogen
1989	EUR	(Australia) Mike Harwood	271	−13	1 stroke	(Australia) Peter Senior	Bokskogen
1988	EUR	(New Zealand) Frank Nobilo	270	−10	1 stroke	(England) Howard Clark	Flommen
1987	EUR	(England) Howard Clark	271	−17	2 strokes	(Australia) Ossie Moore	Ljunghusen
1986	EUR	(Australia) Peter Senior	273	−11	2 strokes	(Sweden) Mats Lanner	Falsterbo
1985	SWE	(England) Denis Durnian	274	−14	8 strokes	(Sweden) Per-Arne Brostedt (Sweden) Ove Sellberg	Flommen
1984	SWE	(England) Tommy Horton	288	E	4 strokes	(England) Denis Durnian (Sweden) Anders Starkman	Ljunghusen
1983		(Sweden) Peter Dahlberg	281	−3	9 strokes	(Sweden) Torbjörn Antevik	Falsterbo
