= Oh Soo-min =

South Korean golfer (born 2008)

Personal information
- Nationality: South Korea
- Born: 16 November 2008 (age 17) Ansan, South Korea
- Height: 5 ft 9 in (175 cm)

Career
- Sport: Golf
- Status: Amateur

Best results in LPGA major championships
- Chevron Championship: DNP
- Women's PGA C'ship: DNP
- U.S. Women's Open: CUT: 2026
- Women's British Open: DNP
- Evian Championship: DNP

Oh Soo-min (born 16 September 2008), also known as Soomin Oh, is a South Korean amateur golfer. She was runner-up at the 2026 Women's NSW Open and third at the 2024 Singapore Women's Open.

== Amateur career ==
Oh was born in Ansan. A teenage golf prodigy, she was tall for her age and known for her length off the tee.

In 2024, Oh became a Korea National Team member and won the World Junior Girls Championship in Canada, and was runner-up at the Spirit International Amateur in Texas. In 2025, she was runner-up in the 2025 Espirito Santo Trophy and successfully defended her title in both the Korean Women's Amateur and Queen Sirikit Cup. She was runner-up at the 2024 APGC Junior Championship and at the Women's Amateur Asia-Pacific Championship in 2025 and 2026.

At only 15 years old, Oh finished 3rd at the 2024 Hana Financial Group Singapore Women's Open, an LPGA of Korea Tour event, after taking a three-shot lead into the final round

Oh rose to 8th in the World Amateur Golf Ranking in 2025.

In 2026, she was runner-up at the Women's NSW Open in Australia, a Ladies European Tour co-sanctioned event, a stroke behind Agathe Laisné after bogeying two of the final three holes.

== Amateur wins ==
- 2023 Song Am Cup
- 2024 Queen Sirikit Cup (individual), Dolmen Cup Amateur Golf Championship, Korean Women's Amateur, Korea Junior Championship, World Junior Girls Championship (individual)
- 2025 Queen Sirikit Cup (individual), Neighbors Trophy Team Championship (individual), Korean Women's Amateur

== Team appearances ==
Amateur

- World Junior Girls Championship (representing South Korea): 2023, 2024 (winners)
- Queen Sirikit Cup (representing South Korea): 2024 (winners), 2025 (winners)
- Spirit International Amateur (representing South Korea): 2024
- Espirito Santo Trophy (representing South Korea): 2025
