= Haruka Morita-WanyaoLu =

Japanese-born Chinese golfer

Lu Wanyao (Haruka Morita) 鲁婉遥（森田遥）
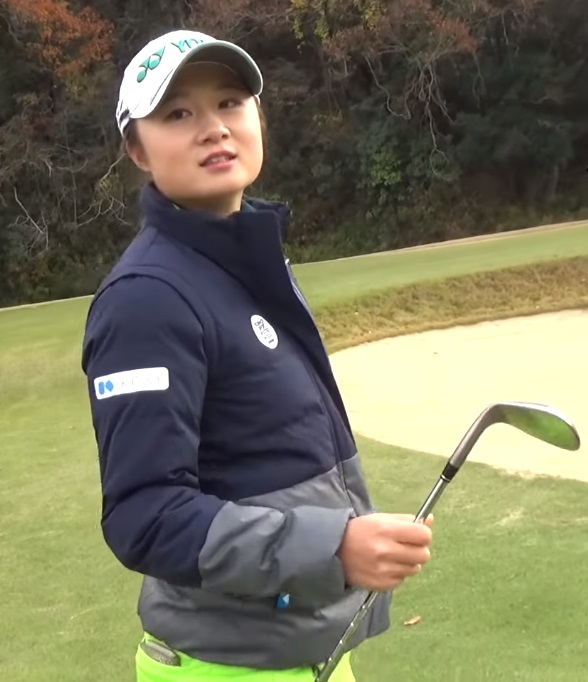

Personal information
- Nationality: China
- Born: 19 July 1996 (age 30) Takamatsu, Kagawa, Japan
- Height: 164 cm (5 ft 5 in)

Career
- Sport: Golf
- Turned professional: 2015
- Current tour: LPGA of Japan Tour
- Former tour: Symetra Tour
- Professional wins: 3

Number of wins by tour
- LPGA of Japan Tour: 2
- Epson Tour: 1

Best results in LPGA major championships
- Chevron Championship: DNP
- Women's PGA C'ship: DNP
- U.S. Women's Open: CUT: 2017
- Women's British Open: DNP
- Evian Championship: DNP

Lu Wanyao (Chinese: 鲁婉遥; born 19 July 1996), also known by her Japanese name Haruka Morita (森田遥, Morita Haruka), is a Chinese professional golfer.

== Early years ==
Her parents are from Shanghai, China. They were table tennis players. Later, they moved to Japan. Lu Wanyao was the winner of 2013 Japan Women's Amateur Championship.

== Professional wins (3) ==
=== LPGA of Japan Tour wins (2) ===
No.	Date	Tournament	Winning score	To par	Margin of victory	Runner-up
1	6 Aug 2017	Hokkaido Meiji Cup	68-71-67=206	−10	1 stroke	(South Korea) Kang Soo-yun
2	8 Oct 2023	Stanley Ladies Honda Golf Tournament	68-65-70=203	−13	2 strokes	(Japan) Yuka Yasuda

=== Symetra Tour wins (1) ===
- 2015 Symetra Classic
