= Emma Broze =

French professional golfer

Personal information
- Nationality: France
- Born: 20 August 1995 (age 31) Feurs, Loire, France

Career
- Sport: Golf
- College: Oklahoma State University
- Turned professional: 2020
- Current tour: Epson Tour (joined 2021)
- Professional wins: 1

Number of wins by tour
- Epson Tour: 1

Emma Broze (born 20 August 1995) is a French professional golfer who plays on the U.S.-based Epson Tour where she won the 2021 Danielle Downey Credit Union Classic. As an amateur, she won the 2014 European Ladies' Team Championship.

== Amateur career ==
Broze was born in Feurs and grew up in Nervieux in the department of Loire, France. She had a successful amateur career and won the 2011 Championnat de France Minimes Filles, and in 2013 she won the German International Ladies Amateur Championship, the Trophee des Regions, and the Championnat de France Cadets. She was also runner-up at the Coupe de France Dames. Broze qualified for the 2016 Ladies' British Open Amateur Championship at Dundonald Links in Scotland.

Broze joined the French National Team in 2010 and represented her country in over 50 events. She captured silver at the 2013 European Girls' Team Championship at Linköping Golf Club, beaten by Sweden in the final. She was a member of the French squad that won the 2014 European Ladies' Team Championship in Slovenia, beating Matilda Castren 1 up in the final for France to win by 4.5–2.5 over Finland. Broze scored 3–0 in singles play during the event. At the 2018 European Ladies' Team Championship in Austria, Broze lost her single in the final to Linn Grant, 3 and 1, and France lost the final to Sweden by 5–2.

She represented France together with Agathe Laisné and Pauline Roussin-Bouchard at the 2018 Espirito Santo Trophy in Ireland, the 28th women's golf World Amateur Team Championship.

Broze attended Oklahoma State University and played with the Oklahoma State Cowgirls golf team between 2014 and 2018, finishing 12th in the NCAA Championship her senior year. She was named All-Big 12 Conference selection her freshman and junior years.

== Professional career ==
Broze turned professional in 2020 and played on the Women's All Pro Tour before joining the Symetra Tour in 2021. In her rookie season, she won the Danielle Downey Credit Union Classic and made eight cuts in 12 events.

== Amateur wins ==
- 2011 Championnat de France Minimes Filles
- 2013 German International Ladies Amateur Championship, Trophee des Regions, Championnat de France Cadets

== Professional wins (1) ==
=== Epson Tour wins (1) ===
No.	Date	Tournament	Winning score	To par	Margin of victory	Runner-up
1	18 Jul 2021	Danielle Downey Credit Union Classic	67-65=132^{^}	−11	1 stroke	(United States) Rachel Rohanna

^{^} Reduced to 36 holes due to rain

== Team appearances ==
Amateur

- European Young Masters (representing France): 2011
- European Girls' Team Championship (representing France): 2013
- European Ladies' Team Championship (representing France): 2014 (winners), 2016, 2018
- Espirito Santo Trophy (representing France): 2018
