= Valley Forge Invitational =

Golf tournament in Pennsylvania

Tournament information
- Location: Pottstown, Pennsylvania
- Established: 2018
- Course: Raven's Claw Golf Club
- Par: 71
- Tour: Symetra Tour
- Format: Stroke play
- Prize fund: $125,000
- Month played: May
- Final year: 2019

Tournament record score
- Aggregate: 197 Louise Ridderström
- To par: −16 as above

Final champion
- (Chinese Taipei) Min Lee

The Valley Forge Invitational was a tournament on the Symetra Tour, the LPGA's developmental tour. It was part of the Symetra Tour's schedule between 2018 and 2019.

It was held at Raven's Claw Golf Club in Pottstown, Pennsylvania.

== Winners ==
Year	Date	Winner	Country	Score	Margin of victory	Runner(s)-up	Purse ($)	Winner's share ($)
2019	Jun 2	Min Lee	Chinese Taipei	198 (−15)	Playoff	(United States) Esther Lee	125,000	18,750
2018	May 26	Louise Ridderström	Sweden	197 (−16)	4 strokes	(South Korea) Min-G Kim (United States) Laura Wearn	100,000	15,000
