= Lee Hyo-song =

South Korean professional golfer (born 2008)

Personal information
- Nationality: South Korea
- Born: 11 November 2008 (age 17) Changwon
- Height: 164 cm (5 ft 5 in)

Career
- Sport: Golf
- Turned professional: 2024
- Current tour: LPGA of Japan Tour
- Professional wins: 1

Number of wins by tour
- LPGA of Japan Tour: 1

Achievements and awards
- JLPGA Rookie of the Year: 2024

Lee Hyo-song (Korean: 이효송; born 11 November 2008), also known as Hyosong Lee, is a South Korean professional golfer. As an amateur player in 2024, she won the World Ladies Championship Salonpas Cup, a major tournament on the LPGA of Japan Tour, becoming the youngest winner on the JLPGA Tour at 15 years and 176 days.

== Early life ==
Lee was inspired to take up golfing from her grandfather, who took her to a driving range at age 9. Her skill on the golf course was noticed early, as she was named to the South Korean national juniors team in 2020 and 2022.

== Amateur career ==
In 2022 at age 13, Lee finished tied for third at the Women's Amateur Asia-Pacific competition at Siam Country Club. She followed that event by winning the Malaysian Amateur Open in the Ladies division. That year, she won the Korean Women's Amateur KangMinKoo Cup, an all ages event.

In 2023, Lee won the Korean Women's Amateur KangMinKoo Cup for the second time.

In 2024, Lee was named to the South Korean national team. That March, Lee placed third individually and helped South Korea win the 2024 Queen Sirikit Cup.

In May, Lee won the three nations Neighbors Trophy before winning the World Ladies Championship Salonpas Cup, one of the major championship tournaments on the LPGA of Japan Tour. The win by an amateur player, was considered a major upset. In the tournament, she broke several records, including becoming the youngest winner on the JLPGA Tour, and establishing the largest comeback win in a majors tournament. Lee became the first Korean woman to win a JLPGA Tour major since 2019 as well as the second Korean amateur to win a JLPGA Tour event.

In July 2024, Lee represented Korea at the R&A Junior Open, where she won the event by eight strokes. It would become the first time a Korean won the Junior Open trophy. At the time of the event, she was ranked seventh in the world on the World Amateur Golf Ranking. After the event, Lee played one more tournament as an amateur, the Korea Junior Championship, before turning professional.

== Professional career ==
In late 2024, Lee joined the LPGA of Japan Tour, where she was named the youngest Rookie of the Year in December. Lee was 16 years old at the time, and had to leave high school in order to compete. Lee's appearance on the tour required special permission from the JLPGA administration, due to her young age. Generally, players have reached their 18th birthday before joining the tour.

As of June on the 2025 LPGA of Japan Tour, Lee's highest result is T29, in the World Ladies Championship Salonpas Cup, where she was defending champion.

== Amateur wins ==
- 2022 Korean Women's Amateur – KangMinKoo Cup, Malaysian Amateur Open (Ladies Division)
- 2023 Korean Women's Amateur – KangMinKoo Cup
- 2024 Neighbors Trophy Team Championship, R&A Junior Open

== Professional wins (1) ==
=== LPGA of Japan Tour wins (1) ===
No.	Date	Tournament	Winning score	To par	Margin of victory	Runner-up
1	5 May 2024	**World Ladies Championship Salonpas Cup**	75-69-69-67=280	−8	1 stroke	(Japan) Shuri Sakuma

Tournaments in bold denotes major tournaments in LPGA of Japan Tour.

== Team appearances ==
Amateur

- Espirito Santo Trophy (representing South Korea): 2023 (winners)
- Queen Sirikit Cup (representing South Korea): 2024 (winners)
