= 2024 LPGA of Japan Tour =

Golf tour season

The 2024 LPGA of Japan Tour was the 56th season of the LPGA of Japan Tour, the professional golf tour for women operated by the Japan Ladies Professional Golfers' Association.

Leading money winner was Rio Takeda with ¥265,730,016. She also won the Mercedes Ranking and finished most often (23 times) inside the top-10. Miyū Yamashita had the lowest scoring average.

== Schedule ==
The results of the season are given in the table below. "Date" is the end date of the tournament. The number in parentheses after winners' names shows the player's total number wins in official money individual events on the LPGA of Japan Tour, including that event.

Date	Tournament	Location	Prize fund (¥)	Winner	WWGR pts
3 Mar	Daikin Orchid Ladies Golf Tournament	Okinawa	120,000,000	(Japan) Chisato Iwai (5)	18.5
10 Mar	Meiji Yasuda Ladies Yokohama Tire Golf Tournament	Kōchi	100,000,000	(Japan) Ai Suzuki (19)	18.5
17 Mar	V-Point-ENEOS Golf Tournament	Kagoshima	100,000,000	(Japan) Ai Suzuki (20)	19.0
24 Mar	AXA Ladies Golf Tournament in Miyazaki	Miyazaki	100,000,000	(Japan) Reika Usui (1)	18.5
31 Mar	Yamaha Ladies Open Katsuragi	Shizuoka	100,000,000	(Japan) Sakura Koiwai (10)	18.5
7 Apr	Fuji Film Studio Alice Women's Open	Saitama	100,000,000	(Japan) Miyuu Abe (1)	18.0
14 Apr	KKT Cup Vantelin Ladies Open	Kumamoto	100,000,000	(Japan) Rio Takeda (1)	19.0
21 Apr	Fujisankei Ladies Classic	Shizuoka	80,000,000	(Japan) Rio Takeda (2)	16.5
28 Apr	Panasonic Open Ladies Golf Tournament	Chiba	80,000,000	(Japan) Haruka Amamoto (1)	17.0
5 May	**World Ladies Championship Salonpas Cup**	Ibaraki	120,000,000	(South Korea) Lee Hyo-song (a,1)	19.5
12 May	RKB-Mitsui Matsushima Ladies	Fukuoka	120,000,000	(Japan) Chisato Iwai (6)	19.0
19 May	Bridgestone Ladies Open	Chiba	100,000,000	(Japan) Rio Takeda (3)	18.5
26 May	Resort Trust Ladies	Hyogo	140,000,000	(Japan) Akie Iwai (4)	18.0
2 Jun	Yonex Ladies Golf Tournament	Niigata	90,000,000	(Japan) Hina Arakaki (2)	12.0
9 Jun	Ai Miyazato Suntory Ladies Open Golf Tournament	Hyōgo	150,000,000	(Japan) Momoko Osato (3)	19.0
16 Jun	Nichirei Ladies	Chiba	100,000,000	(Japan) Akie Iwai (5)	18.0
23 Jun	Earth Mondahmin Cup	Chiba	300,000,000	(Japan) Sakura Koiwai (11)	16.5
30 Jun	Shiseido Ladies Open	Kanagawa	120,000,000	(Japan) Shiho Kuwaki (1)	18.5
7 Jul	MinebeaMitsumi Ladies Hokkaido Shimbun Cup	Hokkaido	100,000,000	(Japan) Haruka Kawasaki (3)	17.0
21 Jul	Daito Kentaku Eheyanet Ladies	Fukuoka	120,000,000	(Japan) Haruka Kawasaki (4)	18.0
4 Aug	Hokkaido Meiji Cup	Hokkaido	90,000,000	(Japan) Rio Takeda (4)	18.5
11 Aug	NEC Karuizawa 72 Golf Tournament	Nagano	100,000,000	(Japan) Yui Kawamoto (2)	18.5
18 Aug	CAT Ladies	Kanagawa	60,000,000	(Japan) Haruka Kawasaki (5)	15.0
25 Aug	Nitori Ladies Golf Tournament	Hokkaido	100,000,000	(Japan) Shiho Kuwaki (2)	12.0
1 Sep	Golf 5 Ladies Professional Golf Tournament	Gifu	80,000,000	(Japan) Rio Takeda (5)	15.0
8 Sep	**Sony JLPGA Championship**	Okinawa	300,000,000	(Japan) Rio Takeda (6)	26.0
15 Sep	Sumitomo Life Vitality Ladies Tokai Classic	Aichi	100,000,000	(Japan) Akie Iwai (6)	19.0
22 Sep	Miyagi TV Cup Dunlop Women's Open Golf Tournament	Miyagi	70,000,000	(Japan) Yuka Yasuda (1)	17.0
29 Sep	**Japan Women's Open Golf Championship**	Ibaraki	170,000,000	(Japan) Rio Takeda (7)	26.0
6 Oct	Stanley Ladies Honda Golf Tournament	Shizuoka	120,000,000	(Japan) Miyu Sato (1)	19.0
13 Oct	Fujitsu Ladies	Chiba	100,000,000	(Japan) Miyū Yamashita (12)	19.0
20 Oct	Nobuta Group Masters GC Ladies	Hyōgo	200,000,000	(South Korea) Lee Min-young (7)	19.0
27 Oct	Hisako Higuchi Mitsubishi Electric Ladies Golf Tournament	Saitama	100,000,000	(Japan) Chisato Iwai (7)	18.5
3 Nov	Toto Japan Classic^	Shiga	US$2,000,000	(Japan) Rio Takeda (8)	31.0
10 Nov	Ito En Ladies Golf Tournament	Chiba	100,000,000	(Japan) Hinako Yamauchi (2)	19.0
17 Nov	Daio Paper Elleair Ladies Open	Ehime	100,000,000	(Japan) Miyū Yamashita (13)	18.5
24 Nov	**Japan LPGA Tour Championship Ricoh Cup**	Miyazaki	120,000,000	(Japan) Shiho Kuwaki (3)	18.0

Events in bold are majors on JLPGA.
(a) denotes amateur.
^ The Toto Japan Classic was co-sanctioned with the LPGA Tour.
