= Elin Arvidsson =

Swedish professional golfer (born 1992)

Personal information
- Full name: Elin Julia Arvidsson
- Nationality: Sweden
- Born: 26 July 1992 (age 34) Falkenberg, Sweden

Career
- Sport: Golf
- College: Texas Tech University
- Turned professional: 2015
- Current tour: Ladies European Tour (joined 2022)
- Former tour: Epson Tour (joined 2016)
- Professional wins: 1

Best results in LPGA major championships
- Chevron Championship: DNP
- Women's PGA C'ship: DNP
- U.S. Women's Open: CUT: 2017
- Women's British Open: DNP
- Evian Championship: DNP

Achievements and awards
- PGA of Sweden Future Fund Award: 2018

Elin Arvidsson (born 26 July 1992) is a Swedish professional golfer and Ladies European Tour player. She previously played on the U.S.-based Epson Tour.

== Early life and amateur career ==
Arvidsson was born in Falkenberg and started playing golf with her family at an early age. She competed on the Skandia Tour, a junior circuit, from her early teens. In 2020, she lost the final of the Swedish Junior Matchplay Championship at Lidingö Golf Club to Isabella Deilert, 1 up.

Arvidsson graduated from the Swedish National Golf High School in 2011 and followed in the footsteps of her older brother, Christoffer, who played college golf in Texas, at Texas State University. Arvidsson enrolled at Texas Tech University in Lubbock, Texas, and played college golf with the Texas Tech Red Raiders women's golf team between 2011 and 2015. She won The Challenge at Onion Creek as a junior. She graduated in May 2015 with a major in Mass Communication and a minor in Media Strategies.

== Professional career ==
Arvidsson turned professional in 2015 and joined the Symetra Tour. In 2017, she recorded her first top-10 finish at the Garden City Charity Classic at Buffalo Dunes. In 2021, she made the cut in 13 of 19 events, and finished 38th in the ranking after recording three top-10 results including season-best finishes of T4 at the IOA Golf Classic and the Four Winds Invitational.

Arvidsson made her LPGA Tour debut at the 2017 U.S. Women's Open after tying with Ashleigh Buhai for first place in the regional sectional qualifier at Prestwick Country Club in Frankfurt, Illinois. Her next LPGA Tour start was in the 2021 Volunteers of America Classic, where she made the cut.

During the COVID-19 pandemic when many events on the Symetra Tour were cancelled, Arvidsson played on the Swedish Golf Tour, where she won the 2020 Swedish PGA Championship.

In 2022, Arvidsson made her Ladies European Tour debut at the season-opening Magical Kenya Ladies Open, where she finished tied for 12th place. Her best finish was a tie for 3rd at the Estrella Damm Ladies Open, and she finished the season 6th in the Rookie of the Year rankings and 43rd in the Order of Merit. In 2023, she tied for 4th at the Aramco Team Series - Singapore alongside Linn Grant and Klara Spilkova.

== Amateur wins ==
- 2007 Skandia Tour Distrikt #3 – Halland
- 2010 Götenehus Short Game Masters
- 2013 The Challenge at Onion Creek

== Professional wins ==
=== Swedish Golf Tour wins (1) ===
No.	Date	Tournament	Winning score	To par	Margin of victory	Runner-up
1	22 Aug 2020	Swedish PGA Championship	70-69-66=205	−8	1 stroke	(Sweden) Linda Lundqvist
