= Michaela Finn =

Swedish professional golfer (born 1996)

Personal information
- Nationality: Sweden
- Born: 2 May 1996 (age 30) Ängelholm, Sweden

Career
- Sport: Golf
- College: Kent State University
- Turned professional: 2019
- Current tour: Ladies European Tour (joined 2025)
- Former tour: Symetra Tour (joined 2020)
- Professional wins: 1

Achievements and awards
- PGA of Sweden Future Fund Award: 2022

Michaela Finn (born 2 May 1996) is a Swedish professional golfer and Ladies European Tour player.

== Early life and amateur career ==
Finn was born in Ängelholm in 1996 and started playing golf when she was twelve. At 15, she was admitted to the Swedish National High School of Golf.

Representing her National Team, Finn finished fourth at the 2012 European Young Masters, won bronze at the 2014 European Girls' Team Championship, and bronze again at the 2017 European Ladies' Team Championship. In 2014, she won a silver medal in the World Junior Girls Championship at Angus Glen Golf Club in Ontario, Canada, together with Emma Svensson and Filippa Möörk.

Finn attended Kent State University 2015–2019 and played golf with the Kent State Golden Flashes women's golf team in the Mid-American Conference. She won the Jim West Challenge in her freshman year. She won the Mid-American Conference Championship as a sophomore and finished runner-up her junior year. She was a three-time All-MAC First Team and collected a total of 17 top-10 performances.

She was runner-up at the 2018 Dixie Amateur behind Alexa Pano and competed at the inaugural Augusta National Women's Amateur in April 2019.

== Professional career ==
Finn turned professional after she graduated in 2019. Before entering qualification for the LPGA Tour, she played in a few tournaments on the Swedish Golf Tour. She was runner-up behind Tonje Daffinrud at the Moss & Rygge Open in Norway, and won the Åhus Open at Kristianstad Golf Club.

Finn joined the Symetra Tour in 2020 and spent five season on the tour. At the 2021 Symetra Tour Championship, she shot a course record 61 in the opening round after 10 birdies in the first 13 holes, before finishing the tournament tied for fifth. In 2022, she shot a 10-under-par to tie for 3rd at the Island Resort Championship.

Finn earned her card for the 2025 Ladies European Tour at Q-School where she tied for 8th.

== Amateur wins ==
- 2011 Skandia Tour Regional #2 - Göteborg, Skandia Tour Regional #5 - Västergötland
- 2012 Skandia Tour Riks #2 - Västergötland, Skandia Tour Regional #6 - Skåne
- 2015 Jim West Challenge
- 2017 Mid-American Conference Championship
- 2018 Illini Invitational at Medinah

== Professional wins (1) ==
=== Swedish Golf Tour wins (1) ===
No.	Date	Tournament	Winning score	To par	Margin of victory	Runner-up	Ref
1	20 Jun 2019	Åhus Open	70-71-70=211	–5	1 stroke	(Sweden) Sara Kjellker (a)	

== Team appearances ==
Amateur

- European Young Masters (representing Sweden): 2012
- World Junior Girls Championship (representing Sweden): 2014
- European Girls' Team Championship (representing Sweden): 2014
- European Ladies' Team Championship (representing Sweden): 2017
