= World Junior Girls Golf Championship =

Tournament information
- Location: Ontario and Quebec, Canada
- Established: 2014
- Course: Rotating
- Organized by: Golf Canada
- Format: 72-hole stroke play
- Month played: October

The World Junior Girls Golf Championship (French: Championnat Mondial Junior Féminin de Golf) is an annual world amateur team golf championship for women under 18 organized in Canada.

== History ==
The inaugural event was held in 2014. Medalists who have gone on to win on the LPGA Tour include Brooke Henderson, Angel Yin, Megan Khang, Yuka Saso, Linn Grant and Atthaya Thitikul.

== Format ==
The competition is open to female juniors who have not reached their 19th birthday by the last scheduled day of the championship, and who are not playing university or college golf. 20 countries with 3 girls per team compete over 72 hole stroke play in a team and individual competition.

== Results ==
| Year | Team | | | Individual | | | Venue | Ref |
| Year | Gold | Silver | Bronze | Gold | Silver | Bronze | Venue | Ref |
|---|---|---|---|---|---|---|---|---|
| 2014 | United States; Mika Liu; Megan Khang; Angel Yin | Sweden; Emma Svensson; Filippa Möörk; Michaela Finn | Canada; Brooke Henderson; Jaclyn Lee; Selena Costabile | (United States) Mika Liu | (United States) Megan Khang | (Sweden) Emma Svensson | Angus Glen Golf Club, Markham, Ontario | |
| 2015 | South Korea; Hye-jin Choi; Eun-soo Jang; Shin Hye Kim | Denmark; Line Toft Hansen; Cecilie Bofill; Puk Lyng Thomsen | Sweden; Filippa Möörk; Elin Esborn; Frida Kinhult | (South Korea) Hye-jin Choi | (Denmark) Cecilie Bofill | (Sweden) Filippa Möörk | Marshes Golf Club, Ottawa | |
| 2016 | Philippines; Yuka Saso; Harmie Nicole Constantino; Sofia Angela Legaspi | South Korea; Hee-Jung Lim; Hae-Ran Ryu; Min-Gyeong Youn | United States; Mika Liu; Jennifer Chang; Elizabeth Wang | (Philippines) Yuka Saso | (United States) Jennifer Chang | (Italy) Caterina Don | Mississaugua G&CC | |
| 2017 | Spain; Blanca Fernández; Elena Arias; Dimana Viudes | South Korea; Seo-yun Kwon; Yunji Jeong; Hae-Ran Ryu | Sweden; Linn Grant; Amanda Linnér; Beatrice Wallin | (South Korea) Seo-yun Kwon | (Italy) Alessia Nobilio | (Spain) Blanca Fernández | Marshes Golf Club | |
| 2018 | Italy; Caterina Don; Alessia Nobilio; Emilie Alba Paltrinieri | United States; Brooke Seay; Michaela Morard; Zoe Campos | Thailand; Kultida Pramphun; Kan Bunnabodee; Atthaya Thitikul | (Thailand) Atthaya Thitikul | (Italy) Alessia Nobilio | (United States) Zoe Campos | Camelot G&CC | |
| 2019 | South Korea; Jung-Min Hong; Ye Won Lee; Yoon Ina | Thailand; Kan Bunnabodee; Yosita Khawnuna; Atthaya Thitikul | Italy; Carolina Melgrati; Alessia Nobilio; Benedetta Moresco | (Thailand) Atthaya Thitikul | (South Korea) Ye Won Lee | (Italy) Alessia Nobilio | Angus Glen Golf Club | |
| 2020 | Canceled due to the COVID-19 pandemic in Canada | | | | | | Angus Glen Golf Club | |
| 2021 | Canceled due to the COVID-19 pandemic in Canada | | | | | | Angus Glen Golf Club | |
| 2022 | Spain; Cayetana Fernández; Andrea Revuelta; Paula Martín | Sweden; Meja Örtengren; Nora Sundberg; Matilda Björkman | Chinese Taipei; Ting-Hsuan Huang; Hsin Chun Liao; Yu-Chu Chen | (Spain) Cayetana Fernández | (Colombia) María José Marín | (Sweden) Meja Örtengren | Angus Glen Golf Club | |
| 2023 | Canada; Anna Huang; Vanessa Borovilos; Vanessa Zhang | South Korea; Oh Soo-min; Park Seo-jin; Yang Hyo-jin | Czech Republic; Denisa Vodičková; Sofie Hlinomazová; Tiphani Knight | (Czech Republic) Denisa Vodičková | (Canada) Anna Huang | (South Korea) Oh Soo-min | Brampton Golf Club | |
| 2024 | South Korea; Oh Soo-min; Park Seo-jin; Hong Su-min | Canada; Aphrodite Deng; Shauna Liu; Clairey Lin | United States; Scarlett Schremmer; Nikki Oh; Chloe Kovelesky | (South Korea) Oh Soo-min | (Canada) Aphrodite Deng | (Hong Kong) Arianna Lau | Credit Valley Golf & Country Club | |
| 2025 | South Korea; Park Seo-jin; Yang Yun-seo; Kim Yeon-seo | Canada; Shauna Liu; Clairey Lin; Michelle Xing; Spain; Adriana García; Liz Hao; Nagore Martínez | | (England) Charlotte Naughton | (Canada) Clara Ding | (Spain) Adriana García | St. Catharines Golf & Country Club | |
| 2026 | United States; Mia Clausen; Anna Fang; Amelie Zalsman | South Korea; Kang Seo-yeon; Yoon Gyu-ri; Kim Seo-ah | Canada; Clairey Lin; Shauna Liu; Nobelle Park | (England) Lauren Crump | (South Korea) Kim Seo-ah | (United States) Anna Fang | Brampton Golf Club | |

== Results summary ==
=== Team tournament ===
| Rank | Nation | Gold | Silver | Bronze | Total |
|---|---|---|---|---|---|
| 1 | South Korea (KOR) | 4 | 4 | 0 | 8 |
| 2 | United States (USA) | 2 | 1 | 2 | 5 |
| 3 | Spain (ESP) | 2 | 1 | 0 | 3 |
| 4 | Canada (CAN) | 1 | 2 | 2 | 5 |
| 5 | Italy (ITA) | 1 | 0 | 1 | 2 |
| 6 | Philippines (PHI) | 1 | 0 | 0 | 1 |
| 7 | Sweden (SWE) | 0 | 2 | 2 | 4 |
| 8 | Thailand (THA) | 0 | 1 | 1 | 2 |
| 9 | Denmark (DNK) | 0 | 1 | 0 | 1 |
| 10 | Chinese Taipei (TPE) | 0 | 0 | 1 | 1 |
| 10 | Czech Republic (CZE) | 0 | 0 | 1 | 1 |
| Totals (11 entries) | | 11 | 12 | 10 | 33 |

== Future sites ==
- 2026 Royal Ottawa Golf Club in Gatineau, Quebec

== See also ==
- Junior Golf World Cup
- Espirito Santo Trophy
