= Reika Usui =

Japanese professional golfer (born 1998)

Reika Usui 臼井 麗香
Personal information
- Nationality: Japan
- Born: 7 December 1998 (age 27) Kanuma, Tochigi, Japan
- Height: 158 cm (5 ft 2 in)

Career
- Sport: Golf
- Turned professional: 2018
- Current tour: LPGA of Japan Tour
- Professional wins: 1

Number of wins by tour
- LPGA of Japan Tour: 1

Reika Usui (臼井 麗香, Usui Reika) (born 7 December 1998) is a Japanese professional golfer. She plays on the LPGA of Japan Tour where she has 1 win.

== Career ==
She captured the 2024 AXA Ladies Golf Tournament in Miyazaki for her maiden win on the JLPGA.

== Professional wins (1) ==
=== LPGA of Japan Tour wins (1) ===
No.	Date	Tournament	Winning score	To par	Margin of victory	Runner(s)-up
1	24 Mar 2024	AXA Ladies Golf Tournament in Miyazaki	65-66=131	−13	1 stroke	(Japan) Miyū Yamashita
