= Oddur Golf Club =

Icelandic golf course

Coordinates: 64.059991°N 21.892018°W

Oddur Golf Club is a golf club and course in Garðabær, Iceland.

Oddur Golf Club was established in 1990 as a nine-hole course and was designed by Hannes Thorsteinsson. It was expanded to an 18-hole course in 1997.

The club consists of two courses: Urrioðavöllur, the 18-hole course, and Ljúflinger, the 9-hole par 3 course.

== Tournaments ==
The club hosted the 2016 European Ladies' Amateur Team Championship and the 2022 European Girls' Team Championship.
