= Falsterbo Golf Club =

Golf club in Falsterbo, Sweden

Coordinates: 55°23′N 12°50′E

- Location in Sweden

Club information
- Location: Falsterbo, Vellinge Municipality, Skåne County, Sweden
- Established: 1909
- Type: Private
- Tota holes: 18
- Tournaments: PLM Open; Skandia PGA Open
- Website: falsterbogk.se

Course
- Designed by: Robert Turnbull (1934); Gunnar Bauer (1953); Peter Nordwall (1999); Peter Chamberlain (2001)
- Par: 71
- Course record: Men: 65 – (France) Oliver David; 65 – (South Africa) Titch Moore; Women: 66 – (Sweden) Caroline Hedwall

Falsterbo Golf Club is a links golf club located in Falsterbo, Skåne County in Sweden. It has hosted the PLM Open on the European Tour.

== History ==
Falsterbo was founded in 1909 and is Sweden's third oldest golf club. In 1911 it was moved a few hundred yards to its current location and the first 9 holes were constructed. The full 18 holes course was consecrated the summer of 1930. After a few changes, the course was finished in its current layout in 1934.

It is located on Sweden's southern tip, along the Baltic Sea, next to Falsterbo Lighthouse built in 1796. It is one of few links courses in Sweden and is repeatedly ranked one of the best courses in the country.

The club has hosted the PLM Open on the European Tour as well as the Skandia PGA Open on the Challenge Tour. It has also hosted many amateur tournaments such as the 1963 European Amateur Team Championship and the 2009 European Ladies Amateur Championship.

== Tournaments hosted ==
=== Pre-European Tour ===
- Volvo Open – 1971

=== European Tour ===
- PLM Open – 1986

=== Challenge Tour Tour ===
- Skandia PGA Open – 2003

=== Amateur ===
- Swedish Matchplay Championship – 1913 · 1915 · 1917 · 1920 · 1933 · 1937 · 1957
- European Amateur Team Championship – 1963
- European Ladies Amateur Championship – 2009

== Course Records ==
- Men: 65 – (France) Oliver David and (South Africa) Titch Moore, 2003 Skandia PGA Open
- Women: 66 – (Sweden) Caroline Hedwall, 2009 European Ladies Amateur Championship

== See also ==
- List of links golf courses
- List of golf courses in Sweden
