= Emma Allen =

Cartoon editor

Emma Allen (born 1987 or 1988) is a cartoon editor for The New Yorker. When she was hired for the role in 2017 at the age of 29, she became the youngest and first female cartoon editor in the magazine's history. She is known for selecting new and diverse humor contributors for the magazine. Editor David Remnick called her "a godsend to The New Yorker."

== Early life ==
Allen grew up on the Upper West Side of Manhattan and attended the private all-girls school Brearley. Her mother worked as a partner in a corporate law firm. As a child, she wanted to be a medieval historian because she believed it would allow her to "hang out with dragons." She cut out New Yorker cartoons and kept them in a green folder.

== Career ==
She chose to attend Yale University in part because she liked Gilmore Girls. In college, her bad luck earned her the nickname "Queen of Catastrophe." She studied English and Studio Art with coursework in photography. She wrote a column in the Yale Daily News called "The Unethicist", in which she wrote tongue-in-cheek bad advice such as "Why You Shouldn't Recycle" and "Why You Should Live Your Life Exactly Modeled on Television Shows." Her senior thesis was a series of collages that included "family photographs, Polaroids, and crappy photos I'd taken of my friends...obscure books, manuals, and catalogs of dolls."

After college, she worked as a bookseller at McNally Jackson in SoHo and as a freelance writer covering art. Her first position at The New Yorker was as assistant to editor Susan Morrison, working on pieces in the "Talk of the Town" section. She also started edited Daily Shouts, The New Yorker humor section, which published one or two humor pieces a day online. She had friends working as stand-up comics and writing for late-night shows, and she caught the attention of editor David Remnick for her ability to draw in fresh humor writers.

In 2017, she became the youngest and first female cartoon editor for the magazine. Allen says that when Bob Mankoff passed on the role of cartoon editor to her, he gave her the following advice: "You pick what's funny. And you get rid of what's not funny. And fundamentally, that is all there is to it." Allen has stated that she would be unable to create rules of New Yorker cartoon humor because "the funniest [cartoons] defy the rules." She has built a reputation for selecting cartoons from a large, diverse group of cartoonists, and she told Washington Post that she has tried to publish humor that reflects "the incredibly vast world of comedy I was seeing at clubs and on TikTok." She has published more female cartoonists than previous editors. As of 2021, she has selected about 100 cartoonists, of which half were women, to publish work in The New Yorker for the first time.

Allen intentionally chooses a variety of highbrow and lowbrow humor. In her current role, she edits the daily cartoons, written and drawn Daily Shouts, Blitt’s Kvetchbook, and humor videos for The New Yorker website. Each week, the magazine gets about a thousand submissions, of which she selects about sixty to present to David Remnick, who selects about fifteen.

== Personal life ==
Allen lives in the Boerum Hill neighborhood of Brooklyn. She has a cat named Dante. She took an improv class and described it as "pure hell" because she dislikes performing.

In 2021, she married Alex Allenchey, an art gallery associate director. She enjoys the observational humor of Lillian Ross and E.B. White.

== Bibliography ==
- Allen, Emma (May 27, 2024). "[Untitled column]". Goings On. Pick Three. The New Yorker. 100 (14): 7. (Note: Note change in Department title from 'Goings on About Town' to 'Goings On. About Town', with further sub-divisions for event categories.) (Note: Online version forms part of a larger "Culture. Goings On" article on the newyorker.com site.)

———————

Bibliography notes
