= Prasco Laboratories =

American pharmaceutical manufacturer

- Company type: Privately Held
- Industry: Pharmaceutical
- Founded: 2002
- Headquarters: Cincinnati, Ohio
- Key people: E. Thomas Arington
- Products: Authorized Generics
- Website: www.prasco.com

Prasco is a pharmaceutical company headquartered in Cincinnati, Ohio, and founded in 2002 by E. Thomas Arington, former chairman and CEO of Duramed Pharmaceuticals and former president of the healthcare consulting firm MarketMaster. The company remains privately held. It specializes in the field of authorized generics, generic drugs manufactured by the branded innovator company but marketed under a private label.

== Company Overview ==
According to IMS Health, the pharmaceutical industry auditing service, Prasco is one of the fastest growing pharmaceutical companies in the industry, in terms of relative growth and prescriptions dispensed for the years 2005 and 2006. Although it does not release financial data, $150 million in sales were tracked by an independent consulting company during 2005, reportedly doubling the previous years' figures. Prasco has funded public opinion research in the field of generic drugs, including a 2005 Roper Public Affairs & Media study that found a majority of Americans support the availability of generic alternatives.

=== Authourized generics ===
Prasco has licensed generic versions of a variety of brand-name prescription drugs, including the antihistamine Allegra, progestin Cyclessa (used in combined oral contraceptive pills), the insomnia medication Ambien, GERD medication Protonix, Advair Diskus, and others allowing them to be the leading authorized generic company with over 18 licensed products.
