= Ljunghusen Golf Club =

Golf club in Höllviken, Sweden

- Location in Sweden
- 55°24′N 12°55′E

Club information
- Location: Höllviken, Vellinge Municipality, Skåne County, Sweden
- Established: 1932
- Type: Private
- Tota holes: 27
- Tournaments: PLM Open; Telia Grand Prix
- Website: ljgk.se

Holes 1-18
- Par: 72
- Course record: 63 – Luke Donald

Ljunghusen Golf Club is a links golf club located in Höllviken, Skåne County in Sweden. It has hosted the PLM Open on the European Tour.

== History ==
The club is located on Sweden's southern tip, along the Baltic Sea. Its first six holes were built in 1932 and by 1965 the club was the first in Scandinavia to feature 27 holes. It is one of few links courses in Sweden and is repeatedly ranked one of the best courses in the country.

The club has hosted the PLM Open on the European Tour as well as the Telia Grand Prix on the Challenge Tour.

It has also hosted many amateur tournaments such as the 1977 Vagliano Trophy and the European Amateur Team Championship in 2001 and 2019.

== Tournaments hosted ==
=== European Tour ===
- PLM Open – 1987

=== Challenge Tour Tour ===
- Telia Grand Prix – 1996 · 1997 · 1998 · 1999 · 2000 · 2002 · 2003 · 2004

=== Swedish Golf Tour (women) ===
- Tourfinal Vellinge Open – 2015 · 2016
- Carpe Diem Beds Trophy – 2018

=== Amateur ===
- SM Match Play – 1972
- Vagliano Trophy – 1977
- European Amateur Team Championship – 2001 · 2019

== Course Records ==
- Men: 63 – Luke Donald, 2001 European Amateur Team Championship
- Women: 67 – Isabella Deilert, 2018 Carpe Diem Beds Trophy

== Ljunghusen in pictures ==
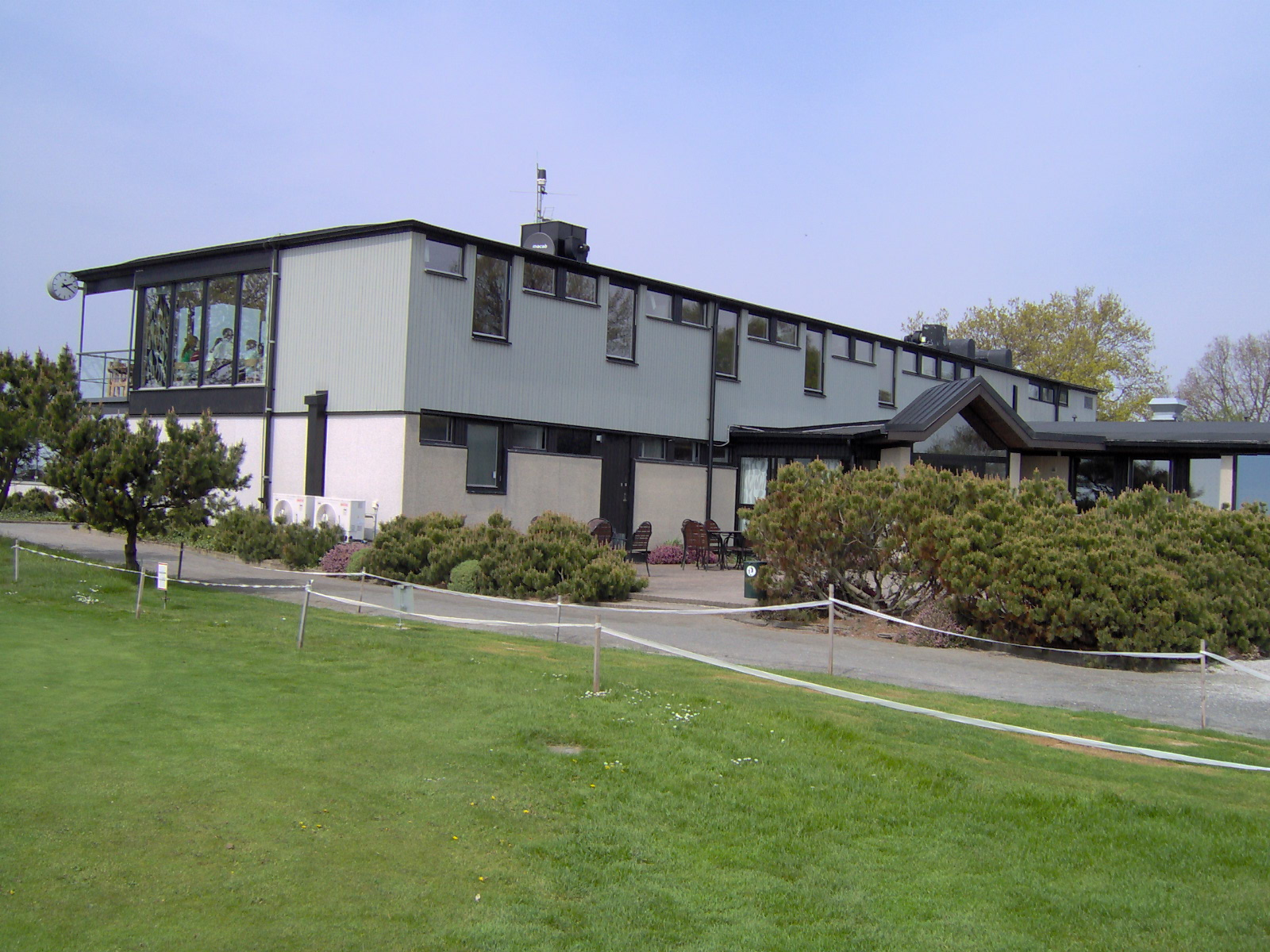
Club House

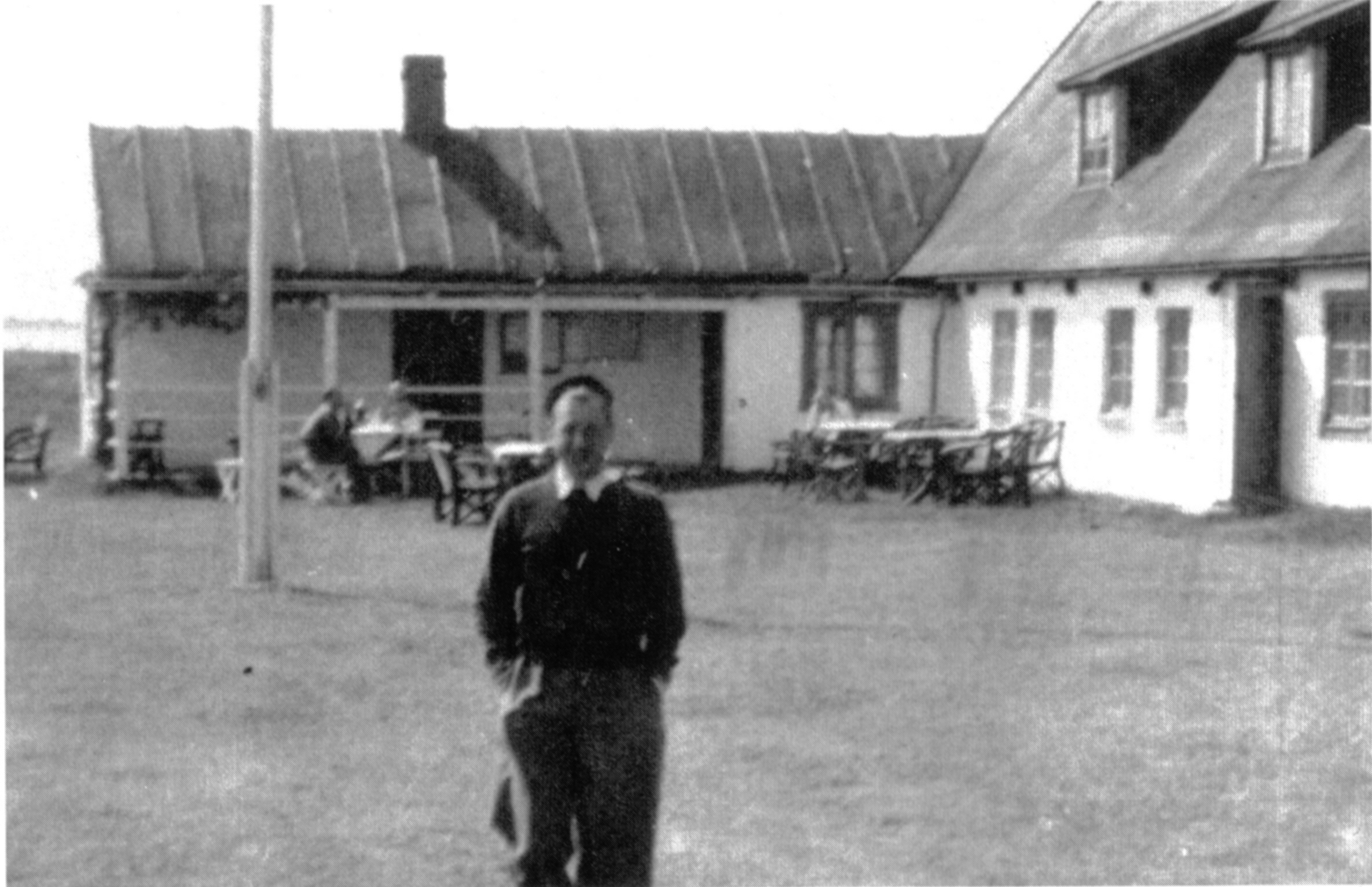
Former Club House

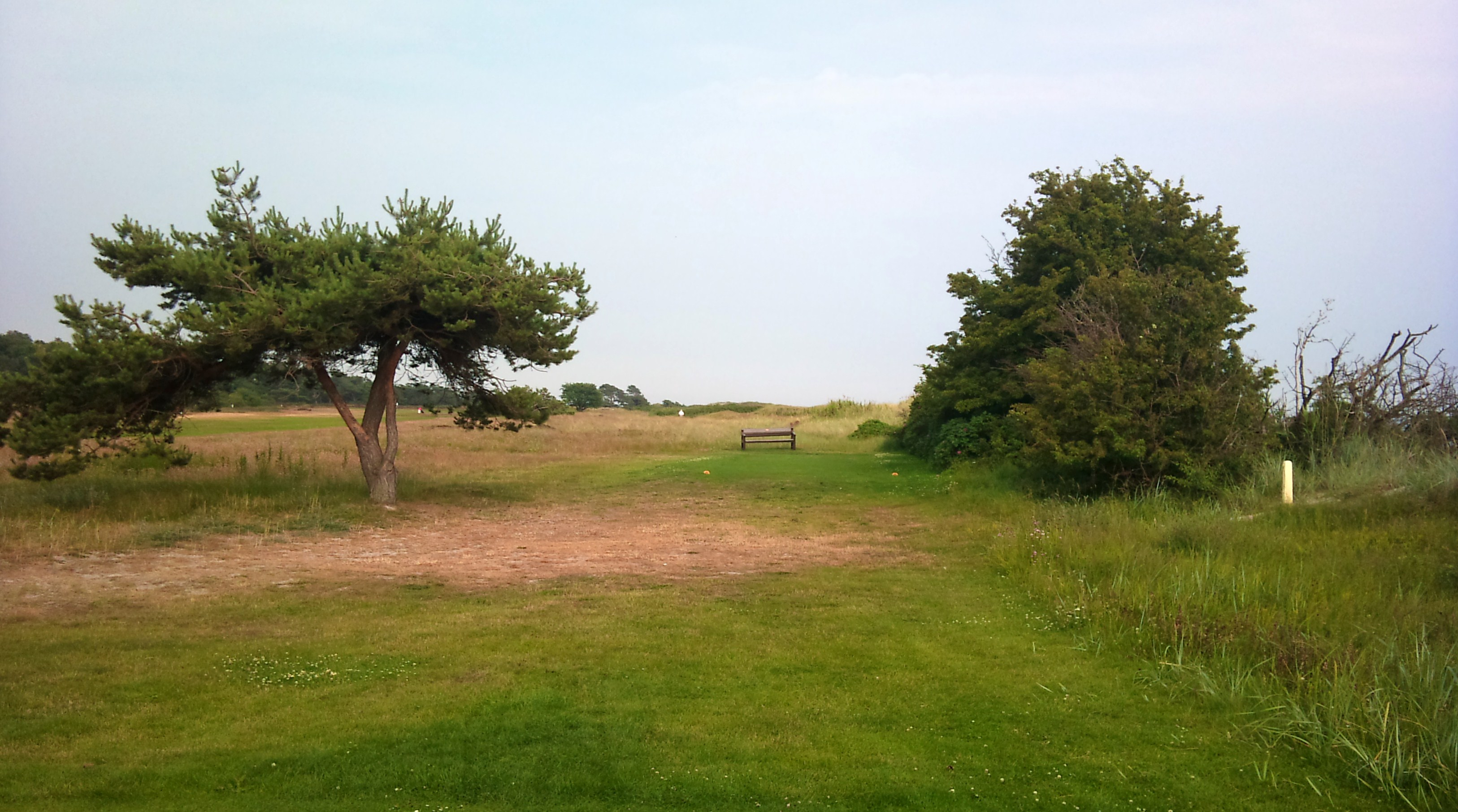
Hole 23

== See also ==
- List of links golf courses
- List of golf courses in Sweden
