= Flommen Golf Club =

Golf club in Falsterbo, Sweden

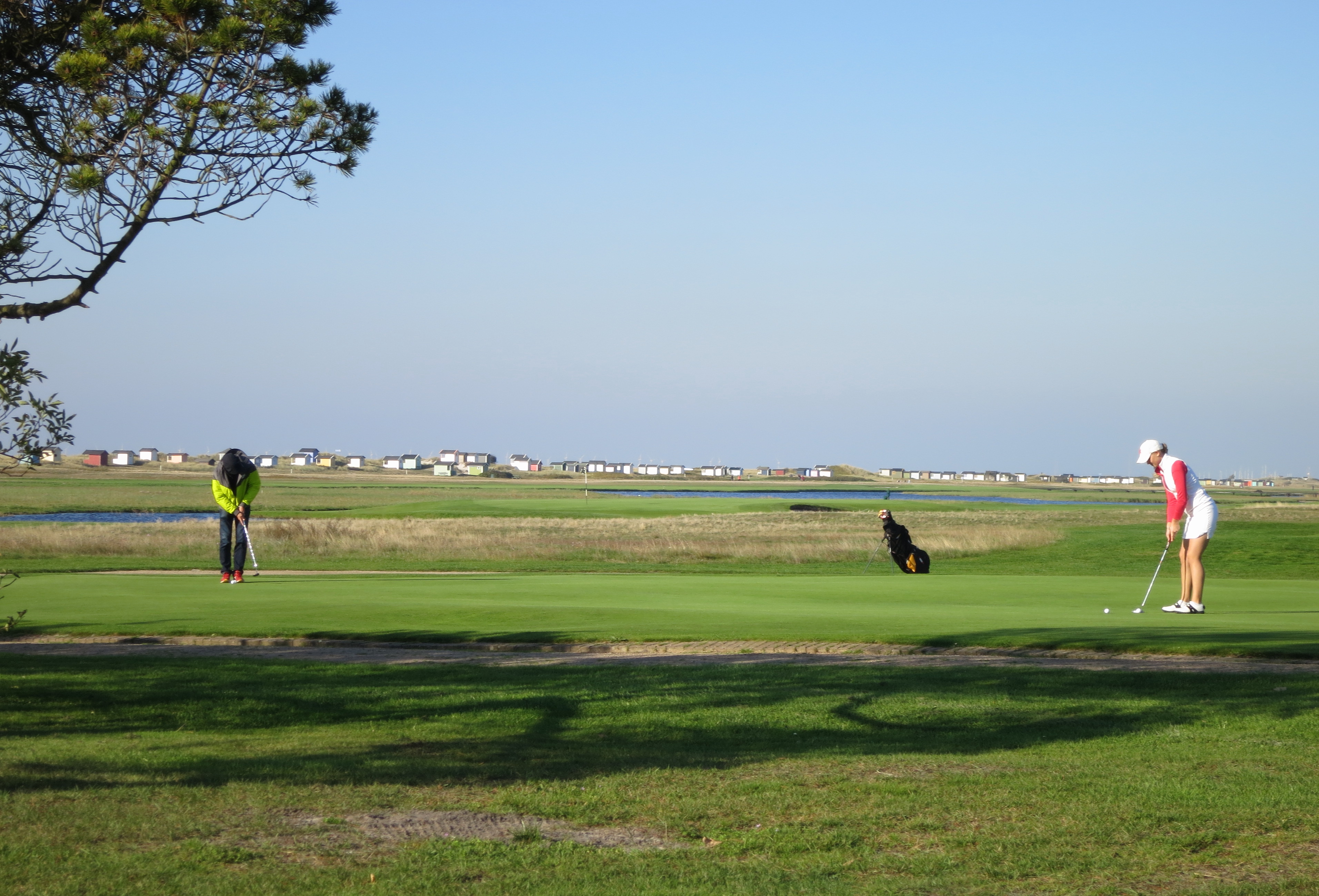
- Flommen Golf Club

- Location in Sweden
- 55°23′36″N 12°49′42″E

Club information
- Location: Falsterbo, Vellinge Municipality, Skåne County, Sweden
- Established: 1935
- Type: Private
- Tota holes: 18
- Tournaments: PLM Open
- Website: www.flommensgk.se

Course
- Designed by: Stig Bergendorff; Stig Kristersson
- Par: 72
- Length: 6075

Flommen Golf Club is a links golf club located in Falsterbo, Skåne County in Sweden. It has hosted the PLM Open on the European Tour.

== History ==
The club was established in 1935 which makes it the country's 19th oldest golf club. It is located on Sweden's southwestern tip, along the Baltic Sea, adjacent to Falsterbo Golf Club and near Ljunghusen Golf Club. Situated in the Flommen Nature Preserve amongst shallow lagoons and high dunes, it is one of few links courses in the country.

The club has hosted the PLM Open on the European Tour. New Zealand's Frank Nobilo recorded his first European Tour victory at the 1988 PLM Open, while eventual world number one Vijay Singh made his European Tour debut, and then-rookie Colin Montgomerie recorded his first top-3 European Tour finish at the same tournament.

== Tournaments hosted ==
=== European Tour ===
- PLM Open – 1988

=== Flommen Open ===
Flommen head pro Gunnar Mueller was the initiator to the 1993 foundation of the Flommen Open professional tournament, which was run for ten years until 2002.

==== Winners ====
- 1993 Fredrik Andersson
- 1994 Christian Härdin
- 1995 Cancelled due to flooding
- 1996 Johan Girdo
- 1997 Fredrik Henge
- 1998 Ville Lemon
- 1999 Niklas Bruzelius
- 2000 Kalle Brink
- 2001 Klas Eriksson
- 2002 Per Nyman

== See also ==
- List of links golf courses
- List of golf courses in Sweden
