= Yuka Yasuda =

Japanese professional golfer (born 2000)

Yuka Yasuda 安田 祐香
Personal information
- Nationality: Japan
- Born: 24 December 2000 (age 25) Kobe, Japan
- Height: 163 cm (5 ft 4 in)

Career
- Sport: Golf
- Turned professional: 2020
- Current tour: LPGA of Japan Tour
- Professional wins: 3

Number of wins by tour
- LPGA of Japan Tour: 3

Best results in LPGA major championships
- Chevron Championship: DNP
- Women's PGA C'ship: DNP
- U.S. Women's Open: DNP
- Women's British Open: T59: 2019
- Evian Championship: T37: 2019

Yuka Yasuda (安田 祐香, Yasuda Yuka) (born 24 December 2000) is a Japanese professional golfer. She plays on the LPGA of Japan Tour where she has three wins.

== Career ==
She captured the 2024 Miyagi TV Cup Dunlop Women's Open Golf Tournament for her maiden win on the JLPGA.

== Professional wins (3) ==
=== LPGA of Japan Tour wins (3) ===
No.	Date	Tournament	Winning score	To par	Margin of victory	Runner(s)-up
1	22 Sep 2024	Miyagi TV Cup Dunlop Women's Open Golf Tournament	65-34=99	−9	3 strokes	(Japan) Saiki Fujita (Japan) Chisato Iwai (Japan) Ayaka Watanabe
2	13 Apr 2025	Fuji Film Studio Alice Women's Open	65-71-71=207	−9	Playoff	(Japan) Yui Kawamoto (Japan) Cocoro Nakamura
3	16 Aug 2026	NEC Karuizawa 72	61-64-68=193	−23	7 strokes	(Japan) Eri Okayama (Japan) Fuka Suga
