= Filippa Möörk =

Swedish professional golfer (born 1997)

Personal information
- Nationality: Sweden
- Born: 14 May 1997 (age 29) Sunne, Sweden

Career
- Sport: Golf
- College: University of Miami
- Turned professional: 2017
- Current tours: Ladies European Tour (joined 2019); Swedish Golf Tour (joined 2018)
- Professional wins: 3

Achievements and awards
- Swedish Golf Tour Order of Merit: 2018
- Sweden PGA Future Fund Award: 2020

Filippa Möörk (born 14 May 1997) is a Swedish professional golfer. She won the 2018 Swedish Golf Tour Order of Merit and joined the Ladies European Tour in 2019.

== Amateur career ==
Möörk enjoyed a prolific amateur career as a junior and won the Skandia Cup Riksfinal in 2010 and 2013, the Sotenäs Junior Open and Nina Reis Junior Open in 2012, and the Skandia Junior Open Girls in 2014, crowning her junior career by winning the Swedish Junior Strokeplay Championship in 2015.

Representing her National Team, she won a silver medal in the 2014 European Girls' Team Championship and a bronze medal in the 2017 European Ladies' Team Championship.

In 2014, she won a silver medal in the World Junior Girls Championship at Angus Glen Golf Club in Ontario, Canada, together with Emma Svensson and Michaela Finn. The following year, she won a bronze medal in the same tournament with Elin Esborn and Frida Kinhult, as well as an individual bronze medal.

Möörk attended the University of Miami in 2016–17 to study business and play golf with the Miami Hurricanes, but dropped out after a year to turn professional. While still an amateur, in 2017, Möörk won a professional event on the Swedish Golf Tour, the Flommen Ladies Open.

== Professional career ==
Möörk turned professional in late 2017 and joined the Swedish Golf Tour. In 2018, she finished third at SM Match Play, was runner-up in the Skaftö Open and Johannesberg Open, and won the Tegelberga Open, helping her secure the 2018 Order of Merit title.

In 2019, Möörk joined the Ladies European Tour after finishing T7 at Q-School, and played in 14 events, making nine cuts. Her best finishes were T12 in the Jabra Ladies Open and T13 in the Lalla Meryem Cup. She finished her rookie season 72nd on the Order of Merit.

== Amateur wins (12) ==
- 2010 (4) Skandia Cup Riksfinal F13, Skandia Tour Riks #1 Värmland, Skandia Tour Regional #3 Värmland, DM Damer Värmland
- 2012 (4) Sotenäs Junior Open, Nina Reis Junior Open, Skandia Tour Riks #4 Småland, Skandia Tour Riks #5 Värmland
- 2013 (1) Skandia Cup Riksfinal F16
- 2014 (1) Skandia Junior Open Girls
- 2015 (2) Skandia Tour Elit Flickor #5, Swedish Junior Strokeplay Championship

== Professional wins (3) ==
=== Swedish Golf Tour wins (3) ===
No.	Date	Tournament	Winning score	To par	Margin of victory	Runner-up	Ref
1	19 Aug 2017	Flommen Ladies Open (as an amateur)	68-72-75=215	–1	4 strokes	(Sweden) Sofie Bringner	
2	6 May 2018	Tegelberga Open	67-73-70=210	–3	3 strokes	(Sweden) Linda Wessberg	
3	12 May 2019	Hinton Golf Open	73-75-72=220	+1	Playoff	(Sweden) Mimmi Bergman	

== Team appearances ==
Amateur

- European Girls' Team Championship (representing Sweden): 2014
- World Junior Girls Championship (representing Sweden): 2014, 2015
- European Ladies' Team Championship (representing Sweden): 2017
