= 2018 Ladies European Tour =

Professional women's golf tour

2018 Ladies European Tour season
- Duration: February 2018 – November 2018
- Number of official events: 15
- Most wins: (Netherlands) Anne van Dam (2)
- Order of Merit: (England) Georgia Hall
- Player of the Year: (England) Georgia Hall
- Rookie of the Year: (Sweden) Julia Engström
- Lowest stroke average: (Spain) Carlota Ciganda

The 2018 Ladies European Tour was a series of golf tournaments for elite female golfers from around the world, which took place from 1 February to 25 November. The tournaments were sanctioned by the Ladies European Tour (LET).

== Schedule ==
The table below shows the 2018 schedule. The numbers in brackets after the winners' names indicate the career wins on the Ladies European Tour, including that event, and is only shown for members of the tour.

Key

Major championships
Regular events
Team championships

Date	Tournament	Location	Winner	WWGR points	Purse	Other tours (Note: ALPG − ALPG Tour, LETAS − LET Access Series, LPGA − LPGA Tour, SLT − Sunshine Ladies Tour, EUR − European Tour.)	Notes
4 Feb	Oates Victorian Open	Australia	(Australia) Minjee Lee (1)	15	A$650,000	ALPG	
11 Feb	ActewAGL Canberra Classic	Australia	(South Korea) Jiyai Shin (n/a)	16.5	A$150,000	ALPG	
25 Feb	Australian Ladies Classic	Australia	(France) Céline Boutier (2)	8	A$350,000	ALPG	
4 Mar	Women's NSW Open	Australia	(England) Meghan MacLaren (1)	6	A$150,000	ALPG	
10 Mar	Investec South African Women's Open	South Africa	(South Africa) Ashleigh Buhai (2)	6	R 2,000,000	SLT	
22 Apr	Lalla Meryem Cup	Morocco	(Sweden) Jenny Haglund (1)	6	€450,000		
2 Jun	Jabra Ladies Open	France	(France) Astrid Vayson de Pradenne (1)	6	€120,000	LETAS	
24 Jun	Ladies European Thailand Championship	Thailand	(Thailand) Kanyalak Preedasuttijit (1)	6	€300,000		
29 Jul	Aberdeen Standard Investments Ladies Scottish Open	Scotland	(Thailand) Ariya Jutanugarn (3)	46	$1,500,000	LPGA	
5 Aug	Ricoh Women's British Open	England	(England) Georgia Hall (1)	100	$3,250,000	LPGA	
9 Sep	Lacoste Ladies Open de France	France	(Sweden) Caroline Hedwall (6)	8	€275,000		
16 Sep	Evian Championship	France	(United States) Angela Stanford (n/a)	100	$3,850,000	LPGA	
23 Sep	Estrella Damm Ladies Open	Spain	(Netherlands) Anne van Dam (2)	16	€300,000		
21 Oct	Hero Women's Indian Open	India	(Wales) Becky Morgan (1)	6	$500,000		
25 Nov	Andalucia Costa Del Sol Open De España Femenino	Spain	(Netherlands) Anne van Dam (3)	12	€300,000		

=== Unofficial events ===
The following events appeared on the schedule, but did not carry official money or Order of Merit ranking points.

Date	Tournament	Location	Winners		Purse	Other tours
6 May	GolfSixes	England	Ireland; Paul Dunne & Gavin Moynihan		€1,000,000	EUR
12 Aug	European Golf Team Championships	Scotland	Sweden; Linda Wessberg & Cajsa Persson	Women's	€500,000	EUR
12 Aug	European Golf Team Championships	Scotland	Iceland; Ólafía Þórunn Kristinsdóttir & Valdis Thora Jonsdottir (with Birgir Hafþórsson & Axel Bóasson)	Mixed	€500,000	EUR

== Order of Merit rankings ==
Rank	Player	Country	Points
1	Georgia Hall	England	667.73
2	Anne van Dam	Netherlands	518.18
3	Caroline Hedwall	Sweden	453.35
4	Jenny Haglund	Sweden	426.10
5	Sarah Kemp	Australia	354.71
6	Christine Wolf	Austria	281.44
7	Olivia Cowan	Germany	248.15
8	Karolin Lampert	Germany	241.08
9	Klára Spilková	Czech Republic	198.24
10	Céline Boutier	France	193.17

== Location of tournaments ==
Location of tournaments in Europe.
Major championship
National open
Regular event
Mixed event
Location of tournaments outside Europe.
National open
Regular event

== See also ==
- 2018 LPGA Tour
- 2018 LET Access Series
