= 2018 European Golf Team Championships – Women's team =

Women's Team Event at the 2018 European Golf Team Championships
- Venue: Gleneagles, Scotland
- Dates: 11 August 2018
- Competitors: 32 from 11 (16 teams) nations

Medalists
gold medal	Sweden 3 Johanna Gustavsson; Julia Engström	Sweden
silver medal	France 2 Justine Dreher; Manon Mollé	France
bronze medal	Great Britain 3 Meghan MacLaren; Michele Thomson	Great Britain

2018 European Golf Team Championships

Tournament information
- Dates: 8–12 August 2018
- Location: Auchterarder, Scotland; 56°17′09″N 3°44′51″W
- Course: PGA Centenary Course, Gleneagles
- Tour: Ladies European Tour
- Format: Match play

Statistics
- Par: 72
- Field: 32 players from 10 nations (16 two-player teams)
- Prize fund: €500,000

Location map
- Location in Scotland

The 2018 European Golf Team Championships men's team event was an event forming part of the 2018 European Golf Team Championships tournament being played in August 2018 at Gleneagles, Scotland. 16 two-player teams took part in the competition.

The event was part of the 2018 European Championships, the inaugural edition of the European Championships, a multi-sport event which is to take place in Berlin, Germany, and Glasgow, Scotland from 2 to 12 August 2018. Sweden 3 took the title from the France 2 team on a second play-off hole - in effect the 20th hole, having finished all square after 18. The Great Britain 3 team won bronze.

== Format ==
The European Golf Team Championships are taking place at Gleneagles in Scotland from 8−12 August 2018, featuring a 50/50 gender split in the field with male and female professionals competing for equal prize money in a men's team match play championship, a women's team match play championship, and a mixed team 18-hole foursomes stroke play championship.

The women's team championships featured a round-robin group fourball format, on 8–10 August, with the winners of each of the four groups progressing to the semi-finals where foursomes will determine the winners, on 12 August. In the group stage, two points were awarded for a win, one point for a halved match, and no points for a loss. Ties between two teams in the standings were determined by their head-to-head result and if teams were still tied for first place then a sudden-death playoff would occur.

== Qualification ==
Qualification for the Championships was via the European Golf Team Championships points tables based on Women's World Golf Rankings points earned from tournaments finishing between 10 July 2017 and 9 July 2018 with a maximum of three teams representing any one nation in each event.

== Competitors ==
Seed	Country	Players (rank)
1	Great Britain 1	Georgia Hall (10) & Laura Davies (201)
2	Great Britain 2	Catriona Matthew (211) & Holly Clyburn (250)
3	Iceland	Ólafía Þórunn Kristinsdóttir (269) & Valdís Þóra Jónsdóttir (357)
4	France 1	Céline Herbin (242) & Astrid Vayson de Pradei (334)
5	Germany 1	Olivia Cowan (247) & Karolin Lampert (252)
6	Great Britain 3	Meghan MacLaren (273) & Michele Thomson (310)
7	Sweden 1	Emma Nilsson (322) & Lina Boqvist (419)
8	Spain	Noemí Jiménez Martín (350) & Silvia Banon (422)
9	Germany 2	Isi Gabsa (349) & Leticia Ras-Anderica (410)
10	Norway	Marianne Skarpnord (345) & Marita Engzelius (389)
11	Finland	Ursula Wikström (308) & Noora Komulainen (447)
12	France 2	Justine Dreher (479) & Manon Mollé (396)
13	Sweden 2	Johanna Gustavsson (441) & Julia Engström (455)
14	Austria	Christine Wolf (398) & Sarah Schober (494)
15	Sweden 3	Cajsa Persson (469) & Linda Wessberg (437)
16	Belgium	Chloe Leurquin (554) & Manon De Roey (663)

== Results ==
=== Pool play ===
Teams were divided into 4 groups of 4 teams and played round-robin matches Wednesday to Friday using the fourball format.

- Round 1 – 8 August
- Round 2 – 9 August
- Round 3 – 10 August

Group A
Round	Winner	Score	Loser
1	Great Britain 1	5 & 4	Spain
1	Germany 2	5 & 3	Belgium
2	Great Britain 1	4 & 3	Germany 2
2	Spain vs Belgium - Halved		
3	Great Britain 1	4 & 2	Belgium
3	Germany 2	2 up	Spain

Seed	Player	W	L	H	Points	Finish
1	Great Britain 1	3	0	0	6	1
9	Germany 2	2	1	0	4	2
8	Spain	0	2	1	1	T3
16	Belgium	0	2	1	1	T3

Group B
Round	Winner	Score	Loser
1	France 1	4 & 3	Germany 1
1	France 2	2 & 1	Sweden 2
2	France 1 vs France 2 - Halved		
2	Sweden 2	3 & 2	Germany 1
3	Sweden 2	4 & 3	France 1
3	France 2	1 up	Germany 1

Seed	Player	W	L	H	Points	Finish
12	France 2	2	0	1	5	1
13	Sweden 2	2	1	0	4	2
4	France 1	1	1	1	3	3
5	Germany 1	0	3	0	0	4

Group C
Round	Winner	Score	Loser
1	Great Britain 3	5 & 4	Iceland
1	Finland	3 & 2	Austria
2	Iceland vs Finland - Halved		
2	Great Britain 3	5 & 3	Austria
3	Iceland vs Austria - Halved		
3	Great Britain 3 vs Finland - Halved		

Seed	Player	W	L	H	Points	Finish
6	Great Britain 3	2	0	1	5	1
11	Finland	1	0	2	4	2
3	Iceland	0	1	2	2	3
14	Austria	0	2	1	1	4

Group D
Round	Winner	Score	Loser
1	Great Britain 2	3 & 2	Sweden 1
1	Sweden 3	5 & 4	Norway
2	Great Britain 2	1 up	Norway
2	Sweden 1	5 & 4	Sweden 3
3	Sweden 3	2 up	Great Britain 2
3	Norway	2 & 1	Sweden 1

Seed	Player	W	L	H	Points	Finish
15	Sweden 3	2	1	0	4	1
2	Great Britain 2	2	1	0	4	2
10	Norway	1	2	0	2	3
7	Sweden 1	1	2	0	2	4

=== Medal bracket ===
Sunday, 12 August

Semifinals
1	Great Britain 1
15	Sweden 3	1 up
12	France 2	5 & 4
6	Great Britain 3

Gold medal match
15	Sweden 3	20th hole
12	France 2
Bronze medal match
1	Great Britain 1
6	Great Britain 3	3 & 1
