= 2018 European Golf Team Championships – Men's team =

Men's Team Event at the 2018 European Golf Team Championships
- Venue: Gleneagles, Scotland
- Dates: 11 August 2018
- Competitors: 32 from 11 (16 teams) nations

Medalists
gold medal	Spain 1 Pedro Oriol; Scott Fernández	Spain
silver medal	Iceland; Birgir Hafþórsson; Axel Bóasson	Iceland
bronze medal	Italy 2 Francesco Laporta; Alessandro Tadini	Italy

2018 European Golf Team Championships

Tournament information
- Dates: 8–12 August 2018
- Location: Auchterarder, Scotland; 56°17′09″N 3°44′51″W
- Course: PGA Centenary Course, Gleneagles
- Tour: European Tour
- Format: Match play

Statistics
- Par: 72
- Field: 32 players from 11 nations (16 two-player teams)
- Prize fund: €500,000

Location map
- Location in Scotland

The 2018 European Golf Team Championships men's team event was an event forming part of the 2018 European Golf Team Championships tournament being played in August 2018 at Gleneagles, Scotland. 16 two-player teams took part in the competition.

The event was part of the 2018 European Championships, the inaugural edition of the European Championships, a multi-sport event which is to take place in Berlin, Germany, and Glasgow, Scotland from 2 to 12 August 2018. Spain 1 took the title from the Iceland team. The Italy 2 team won bronze.

== Format ==
The European Golf Team Championships are taking place at Gleneagles in Scotland from 8−12 August 2018, featuring a 50/50 gender split in the field with male and female professionals competing for equal prize money in a men's team match play championship, a women's team match play championship, and a mixed team 18-hole foursomes stroke play championship.

The men's team championships featured a round-robin group fourball format, on 8–10 August, with the winners of each of the four groups progressing to the semi-finals where foursomes will determine the winners, on 12 August. In the group stage, two points were awarded for a win, one point for a halved match, and no points for a loss. Ties between two teams in the standings were determined by their head-to-head result and if teams were still tied for first place then a sudden-death playoff would occur.

== Qualification ==
Qualification for the Championships was via the European Golf Team Championships points tables based on men's Official World Golf Ranking points earned from tournaments finishing between 10 July 2017 and 9 July 2018 with a maximum of three teams representing any one nation in each event.

== Competitors ==
Seed	Country	Players (rank)
1	Great Britain 1	Callum Shinkwin (230) & Lee Slattery (233)
2	Italy 1	Lorenzo Gagli (275) & Guido Migliozzi (593)
3	Spain 1	Pedro Oriol (355) & Scott Fernández (476)
4	Great Britain 2	Rhys Enoch (396) & Charlie Ford (509)
5	Great Britain 3	Connor Syme (322) & Liam Johnston (381)
6	Portugal	José-Filipe Lima (341) & Ricardo Santos (738)
7	Norway	Jarand Ekeland Arnøy (668) & Kristian Krogh Johannessen (493)
8	Spain 2	Santiago Tarrío (391) & David Borda (649)
9	Sweden 1	Per Längfors (468) & Johan Edfors (759)
10	Iceland	Birgir Hafþórsson (586) & Axel Bóasson (663)
11	Poland	Adrian Meronk (588) & Mateusz Gradecki (947)
12	Italy 2	Francesco Laporta (566) & Alessandro Tadini (858)
13	Ireland	Michael Hoey (536) & Neil O'Briain (983)
14	Denmark	Martin Ovesen (828) & Niklas Nørgaard (1040)
15	Belgium	Christopher Mivis (537) & Lars Buijs (1782)
16	Sweden 2	Daniel Jennevret (843) & Oscar Florén (1749)

== Results ==
=== Pool play ===
Teams were divided into 4 groups of 4 teams and played round-robin matches Wednesday to Friday using the fourball format.

- Round 1 – 8 August
- Round 2 – 9 August
- Round 3 – 10 August

Group A
Round	Winner	Score	Loser
1	Great Britain 1 vs Spain 2 - Halved		
1	Sweden 2	1 up	Sweden 1
2	Great Britain 1	6 & 5	Sweden 1
2	Spain 2	1 up	Sweden 2
3	Sweden 2	3 & 2	Great Britain 1
3	Spain 2	3 & 2	Sweden 1

Seed	Player	W	L	H	Points	Finish
8	Spain 2	2	0	1	5	1
16	Sweden 2	2	1	0	4	2
1	Great Britain 1	1	1	1	3	3
9	Sweden 1	0	3	0	0	4

Group B
Round	Winner	Score	Loser
1	Great Britain 3	4 & 3	Great Britain 2
1	Italy 2	2 & 1	Ireland
2	Italy 2	2 & 1	Great Britain 2
2	Great Britain 3	2 & 1	Ireland
3	Ireland	4 & 3	Great Britain 2
3	Italy 2	1 up	Great Britain 3

Seed	Player	W	L	H	Points	Finish
12	Italy 2	3	0	0	6	1
5	Great Britain 3	2	1	0	4	2
13	Ireland	1	2	0	2	3
4	Great Britain 2	0	3	0	0	4

Group C
Round	Winner	Score	Loser
1	Spain 1	2 & 1	Portugal
1	Poland	1 up	Denmark
2	Spain 1	2 & 1	Poland
2	Portugal	2 & 1	Denmark
3	Denmark	4 & 3	Spain 1
3	Portugal	5 & 3	Poland

Seed	Player	W	L	H	Points	Finish
3	Spain 1	2	1	0	4	1
6	Portugal	2	1	0	4	2
11	Poland	1	2	0	2	3
14	Denmark	1	2	0	2	4

Group D
Round	Winner	Score	Loser
1	Norway	4 & 3	Italy 1
1	Iceland	6 & 5	Belgium
2	Iceland	2 & 1	Italy 1
2	Norway	1 up	Belgium
3	Italy 1	4 & 3	Belgium
3	Iceland	2 up	Norway

Seed	Player	W	L	H	Points	Finish
10	Iceland	3	0	0	6	1
7	Norway	2	0	0	4	2
2	Italy 1	1	2	0	2	3
15	Belgium	0	3	0	0	4

=== Medal bracket ===
Sunday, 12 August

Semifinals
8	Spain 2
10	Iceland	2 & 1
12	Italy 2
3	Spain 1	2 up

Gold medal match
10	Iceland
3	Spain 1	2 up
Bronze medal match
8	Spain 2
12	Italy 2	5 & 3
