= Michele Thomson =

English professional golfer

Personal information
- Nationality: Scotland
- Born: 11 March 1988 (age 38) Aberdeen, Scotland

Career
- Sport: Golf
- College: Scottish Police College
- Turned professional: 2009
- Current tour: Ladies European Tour (joined 2009)
- Former tour: LET Access Series
- Professional wins: 1

Best results in LPGA major championships
- Chevron Championship: DNP
- Women's PGA C'ship: DNP
- U.S. Women's Open: DNP
- Women's British Open: 74th: 2020
- Evian Championship: DNP
Medal record
Representing Great Britain
European Golf Team Championships
Silver medal – second place	2018 Gleneagles	Mixed team
Bronze medal – third place	2018 Gleneagles	Women's team

Michele Thomson (born 11 March 1988) is a Scottish professional golfer who plays on the Ladies European Tour (LET). She was runner-up in the 2017 Hero Women's Indian Open and won the team event of the 2020 Saudi Ladies Team International.

== Early life and amateur career ==
Thomson was first introduced to golf at the age of 11 by her father, Graham, and brother, Mark, who are both keen golfers. She is an honorary member at the McDonald Golf Club in Ellon, Aberdeenshire, as a former pupil at Ellon Academy.

Thomson had a successful amateur career and won the 2008 Scottish Women's Amateur Championship. She played for Scotland in the Women's Home Internationals and the European Ladies' Team Championship, and represented Great Britain & Ireland in the 2008 Curtis Cup.

== Professional career ==
Thomson turned professional in 2009 and joined the Ladies European Tour. She made only 3 cuts in 2009 and quit tour to attend the Scottish Police College at Tulliallan Castle and became a police officer in Aberdeen.

In 2013, following a three-year break, Thomson returned to the sport and started playing in the LET Access Series. In 2015 she recorded a victory at the Ribeira Sacra Patrimonio de la Humanidad International Ladies Open in Spain, and finished 8th in the Order of Merit. In 2016, she was runner-up at both the Ribeira Sacra Patrimonio de la Humanidad International Ladies Open and the PGA Halmstad Ladies Open at Haverdal in Sweden. She finished 4th in the Order of Merit to graduate to the Ladies European Tour.

On the LET, Thomson was runner-up in the 2017 Hero Women's Indian Open, 1 stroke behind Camille Chevalier of France, to end the season 16th in the rankings.

Thomson won a silver medal in the mixed event at the 2018 European Golf Team Championships at Gleneagles, together with a Great Britain made up of Connor Syme, Liam Johnston and Meghan MacLaren. She also won a bronze medal with MacLaren in the women's event.

In 2019, she was tied 3rd at the Investec South African Women's Open, two strokes behind winner Diksha Dagar. In 2020, she made her breakthrough with victory in Saudi Ladies Team International alongside Emily Kristine Pedersen and Casandra Hall. At the 2020 Women's British Open she finished last of those that made the cut.

Thomson started 2021 with a tie for 4th at the Ladies Italian Open, two strokes behind winner Lucie Malchirand. She shot a 7-under 65 to take the first-round lead in the LPGA Tour co-sanctioned Women's Scottish Open. With an 80 in the second round, she lost out on both the tournament title and the Jock MacVicar Leading Scot Trophy, instead won by Kelsey Macdonald. Her father suffered a heart attack while caddying for her during the Gant Ladies Open in Finland, forcing her to withdraw.

== Amateur wins ==
- 2008 Scottish Women's Amateur Championship

== Professional wins (1) ==
=== LET Access Series wins (1) ===
Date	Tournament	Score	Margin of victory	Runners-up
1 May 2015	Ribeira Sacra Patrimonio de la Humanidad International Ladies Open	−6 (69-69-66=204)	4 strokes	(Spain) Natalia Escuriola (a) (Spain) Maria Palacios Siegenthaler (Finland) Sanna Nuutinen (Spain) Luna Sobrón (a)

== Team appearances ==
Amateur

- Women's Home Internationals: (representing Scotland): 2007, 2008
- Curtis Cup (representing Great Britain & Ireland): 2008
- European Ladies' Team Championship (representing Scotland): 2007, 2080

Professional

- European Championships (representing Great Britain): 2018
