= 2018 European Golf Team Championships – Mixed team =

Mixed Team Event at the 2018 European Golf Team Championships
- Venue: Gleneagles, Scotland
- Dates: 11 August 2018
- Competitors: 44 from 8 nations

Medalists
gold medal	Iceland; Birgir Hafþórsson & Valdis Thora Jonsdottir; Axel Bóasson & Ólafía Þórunn Kristinsdóttir	Iceland
silver medal	Great Britain 3 Connor Syme & Michele Thomson; Liam Johnston & Meghan MacLaren	Great Britain
bronze medal	Sweden 2 Daniel Jennevret & Julia Engström; Oscar Florén & Johanna Gustavsson	Sweden

2018 European Golf Team Championships

Tournament information
- Dates: 11 August 2018
- Location: Auchterarder, Scotland; 56°17′09″N 3°44′51″W
- Course: PGA Centenary Course, Gleneagles
- Tours: European Tour; Ladies European Tour
- Format: Men's/women's team – match play Mixed team – 18-hole stroke play

Statistics
- Par: 72
- Field: 44 players from 8 nations (11 four-player teams)
- Prize fund: €95,000

Location map
- Location in Scotland

The 2018 European Golf Team Championships mixed team event was an event forming part of the 2018 European Golf Team Championships tournament being played in August 2018 at Gleneagles, Scotland. Eleven four-player teams took part in the competition.

The event was part of the 2018 European Championships, the inaugural edition of the European Championships, a multi-sport event which is to take place in Berlin, Germany, and Glasgow, Scotland from 2 to 12 August 2018. In a surprise victory, Iceland took the title by one stroke from the Great Britain 3 team. The Sweden 2 team won bronze in the first hole of a playoff with Spain.

== Format ==
The European Golf Team Championships are taking place at Gleneagles in Scotland from 8−12 August 2018, featuring a 50/50 gender split in the field with male and female professionals competing for equal prize money in a men's team match play championship, a women's team match play championship, and a mixed-team 18-hole foursomes stroke play championship.

The mixed team championship comprised eleven teams of four (2 men and 2 women) playing in 18-hole mixed foursomes stroke play on 11 August, with combined scores used for team's total score. Ties for medal positions were determined by sudden-death playoff involving the low-scoring foursome from each team involved.

== Qualification ==
Qualification for the Championships was via the European Golf Team Championships points tables for men and women, which were based on men's Official World Golf Ranking points and women's World Golf Rankings points earned from tournaments finishing between 10 July 2017 and 9 July 2018 with a maximum of three teams representing any one nation in each event.

== Results ==
Rank	Seed	Country	Foursome 1	Score	Foursome 2	Score	Total
1st place, gold medalist(s)	8	Iceland	Birgir Hafþórsson & Valdis Thora Jonsdottir	70 (−2)	Axel Bóasson & Ólafía Þórunn Kristinsdóttir	71 (−1)	141 (−3)
2nd place, silver medalist(s)	3	Great Britain 3	Connor Syme & Michele Thomson	70 (−2)	Liam Johnston & Meghan MacLaren	72 (E)	142 (−2)
3rd place, bronze medalist(s)	7	Sweden 2*	Daniel Jennevret & Julia Engström	73 (+1)	Oscar Florén & Johanna Gustavsson	70 (−2)	143 (−1)
4	4	Spain	Pedro Oriol & Silvia Banon	75 (+3)	Scott Fernández & Noemí Jiménez Martín	68 (−4)	143 (−1)
5	1	Great Britain 1	Callum Shinkwin & Laura Davies	76 (+4)	Lee Slattery & Georgia Hall	69 (−3)	145 (+1)
5	6	Sweden 1	Per Längfors & Lina Boqvist	73 (+1)	Johan Edfors & Emma Nilsson	72 (E)	145 (+1)
7	–	Austria	Clemens Gaster & Sarah Schober	75 (=3)	Bernard Neumayer & Christine Wolf	72 (E)	147 (+3)
8	9	Belgium	Christopher Mivis & Manon De Roey	71 (−1)	Lars Buijs & Chloé Leurquin	77 (+5)	148 (+4)
9	5	Norway	Jarand Ekeland Arnøy & Marita Engzelius	76 (+4)	Kristian Krogh Johannessen & Marianne Skarpnord	73 (+1)	149 (+5)
10	2	Great Britain 2	Rhys Enoch & Holly Clyburn	73 (+1)	Charlie Ford & Catriona Matthew	76 (+4)	149 (+5)
11	–	Italy	Lorenzo Gagli & Stefania Avanzo	74 (+2)	Guido Migliozzi & Diana Luna	76 (+4)	150 (+6)

Bronze medal playoff

* Sweden 2 defeated Spain on the first hole of the bronze medal playoff.
