= Valdís Þóra Jónsdóttir =

Icelandic professional golfer

Personal information
- Nationality: Iceland
- Born: 4 December 1989 (age 36) Akranes, Iceland

Career
- Sport: Golf
- College: Texas State University
- Turned professional: 2013
- Former tours: Ladies European Tour (2017–2020); LET Access Series (joined 2015)
- Professional wins: 3

Best results in LPGA major championships
- Chevron Championship: DNP
- Women's PGA C'ship: DNP
- U.S. Women's Open: CUT: 2017
- Women's British Open: CUT: 2018
- Evian Championship: DNP

Achievements and awards
- Icelandic Golfer of Year: 2010
Medal record
European Golf Team Championships
Gold medal – first place	2018 Gleneagles	Mixed team

Valdís Þóra Jónsdóttir (born 4 December 1989) is an Icelandic professional golfer who played on the Ladies European Tour between 2017 and 2020. She won the mixed team gold at the 2018 European Golf Team Championships.

== Early life and amateur career ==
Jónsdóttir was born in Akranes and participated in her first golf tournament when she was 8 years old. At 13, she started training seriously, and she was named Athlete of the Year in her hometown Akranes 4 years in a row 2007–2010. She won the Icelandic National Championship in 2009, 2012 and 2017.

She played for the National Team, including at the European Ladies' Team Championship and the 2012 Espirito Santo Trophy. In 2010 she was named Icelandic Golfer of Year.

Jónsdóttir attended Texas State University and played with the Texas State Bobcats women's golf team.

== Professional career ==
Jónsdóttir turned professional in 2013 and joined the LET Access Series in 2015. In 2016, she tied for 3rd at the Ribeira Sacra Patrimonio de la Humanidad International Ladies Open, one stroke behind winner Marion Duvernay.

In 2017, Jónsdóttir joined the Ladies European Tour after finishing 2nd at Q-School, behind Madelene Sagström. Her best finnish in her rookie season was a solo 3rd place at the Sanya Ladies Open in China, behind Solar Lee and winner Céline Boutier. She led the season-ending Santander Golf Tour LETAS El Saler by 3 strokes after the first round, but finished solo second, a stroke behind Emma Nilsson. She also qualified for her first major, the 2017 U.S. Women's Open.

In 2018, she finished third at the Australian Ladies Classic Bonville, again behind winner Boutier. After a tie for 21st at the South African Women's Open, she rose to a career high of 299th in the Women's World Golf Rankings. She qualified for her second major, the 2018 Women's British Open, as one of the top-25 in the LET Order of Merit.

Jónsdóttir represented Iceland at the 2018 European Golf Team Championships at Gleneagles, Scotland. She won the mixed team gold together with Ólafía Þórunn Kristinsdóttir, Birgir Hafþórsson and Axel Bóasson.

In 2019, she followed up a first round 63 with a 70 to hold a two-stroke lead after the second day of the NSW Women's Open. She finished 5th. In 2020, she recorded a 7th place finish at the South African Women's Open, 3 strokes behind winner Alice Hewson.

Plagued for years by a back injury, Jónsdóttir announced her retirement from tour in April 2021.

== Professional wins (3) ==
- 2009 Icelandic National Golf Championship (as an amateur)
- 2012 Icelandic National Golf Championship (as an amateur)
- 2017 Icelandic National Golf Championship

== Results in LPGA majors ==
Results not in chronological order.

Tournament	2017	2018
ANA Inspiration		
U.S. Women's Open	CUT	
Women's PGA Championship		
The Evian Championship		
Women's British Open		CUT

Did not play

CUT = missed the half-way cut
T = tied

== Team appearances ==
Amateur

- European Ladies' Team Championship (representing Iceland): 2009, 2010, 2011
- Espirito Santo Trophy (representing Iceland): 2012

Professional

- European Championships (representing Iceland): 2018 (winner – mixed team)
