= Axel Bóasson =

Icelandic professional golfer

Personal information
- Nationality: Iceland
- Born: 3 June 1990 (age 36) Reykjavík, Iceland
- Height: 187 cm (6 ft 2 in)

Career
- Sport: Golf
- College: Mississippi State University
- Turned professional: 2016
- Current tour: Nordic Golf League
- Former tour: Challenge Tour
- Professional wins: 4

Achievements and awards
- Danish Golf Tour Order of Merit winner: 2017
- Swedish Golf Tour Order of Merit winner: 2017
- Nordic Golf League Order of Merit winner: 2017
Medal record
European Golf Team Championships
Gold medal – first place	2018 Gleneagles	Mixed team
Silver medal – second place	2018 Gleneagles	Men's team

Axel Bóasson (born 3 June 1990) is an Icelandic professional golfer. In 2017, he became Iceland's first winner on the Nordic Golf League and won the Nordic Golf League Order of Merit. He also won the mixed team gold and the men's silver at the 2018 European Golf Team Championships at Gleneagles, Scotland.

== Early life and amateur career ==
Bóasson was born in Reykjavík. He won the Icelandic Championship in 2011 and represented Iceland at the 2011 European Amateur Team Championship and the 2012 Eisenhower Trophy.

In 2015, he won both the Icelandic Match Play Championship and the Icelandic Stroke Play Championship.

Bóasson attended Mississippi State University between 2010 and 2014 and played with the Mississippi State Bulldogs golf team in the Southeastern Conference.

== Professional career ==
Bóasson turned professional in 2016 and joined the Nordic Golf League. He became the first ever Icelandic winner of the Nordic Golf League in 2017 when he won the SM Match in Sweden. He also won the 12 Twelve Championship in Denmark and finished inside the top ten on nine further occasions over 20 starts, to become the Nordic Golf League Order of Merit winner, and was promoted to the Challenge Tour.

Bóasson represented Iceland at the 2018 European Golf Team Championships at Gleneagles, Scotland. He won the team gold together with Ólafía Þórunn Kristinsdóttir, Valdis Thora Jonsdottir and Birgir Hafþórsson, and silver behind Spain in the men's event with Hafþórsson.

== Amateur wins ==
- 2011 Icelandic Championship
- 2015 Eimskipsmotarodin 4 - Icelandic Match Play Championship, Eimskipsmotarodin 5 - Icelandic Stroke Play Championship

== Professional wins (4) ==
=== Nordic Golf League wins (4) ===
No.	Date	Tournament	Winning score	Margin of victory	Runner-up
1	1 Jul 2017	SM Match	3 and 1		(Denmark) Daniel Løkke
2	22 Sep 2017	12 Twelve Championship	−15 (45-46-42-43-20=196)	1 stroke	(Sweden) Jesper Billing
3	15 May 2022	Rewell Elisefarm Challenge	−7 (68-68-73=209)	2 strokes	(Denmark) Nicolai Tinning
4	14 Jul 2023	Big Green Egg Swedish Matchplay Championship (2)	1 up		(Sweden) Felix Pålson

== Team appearances ==
Amateur

- European Boys' Team Championship (representing Iceland): 2006, 2008
- European Amateur Team Championship (representing Iceland): 2009, 2010, 2011
- Eisenhower Trophy (representing Iceland): 2012

Professional

- European Championships (representing Iceland): 2018 (winner – mixed team)
