= Birgir Hafþórsson =

Icelandic professional golfer

Personal information
- Full name: Birgir Leifur Hafþórsson
- Nationality: Iceland
- Born: 16 May 1976 (age 50) Akranes, Iceland
- Height: 187 cm (6 ft 2 in)

Career
- Sport: Golf
- Turned professional: 1997
- Former tours: European Tour; Challenge Tour; Nordic Golf League; Swedish Golf Tour
- Professional wins: 5

Number of wins by tour
- Challenge Tour: 1
- Other: 4
Medal record
European Golf Team Championships
Gold medal – first place	2018 Gleneagles	Mixed team
Silver medal – second place	2018 Gleneagles	Men's team

Birgir Leifur Hafþórsson (born 16 May 1976) is an Icelandic professional golfer and former European Tour player. At age 41, he became Iceland's first winner on the Challenge Tour, winning the 2017 Cordon Golf Open in France. He also won the mixed team gold and the men's silver at the 2018 European Golf Team Championships at Gleneagles, Scotland.

== Early life and amateur career ==
Hafþórsson was born in Akranes, Iceland, and took up golf with a group of friends when he was 12. His uncle Sveinn Arsalsson was the first National Champion of Iceland.

He first won the Icelandic National Golf Championship as an amateur in 1996, and would go on to win also in 2003, 2004 and 2010.

== Professional career ==
Hafþórsson turned professional in 1997 and joined the Swedish Golf Tour. He attended the European Tour Qualifying School 18 times between 1997 and 2016, and was successful in 2006 and 2007, the other years playing with limited status, mainly on the Challenge Tour.

Hafþórsson joined the European Tour in 2007 after taking the 25th card at Q-School. His best finish in his rookie season was a tie for 11th at the Telecom Italia Open, 3 strokes behind winner Gonzalo Fernández-Castaño. He finished in 12th place at Q-School to keep his card, but he sustained a debilitating injury to his lower back in 2008. He suffered from spondylolisthesis, a condition in which a defect in a part of the spine causes vertebra to slip, and played the European Tour on a medical extension in 2009.

Playing mainly on the Challenge Tour from 2011, he finished 3rd at the 2011 Mugello Tuscany Open, and won the 2017 Cordon Golf Open in France by a convincing 7 strokes. At age 41, he became Iceland's first winner on the Challenge Tour.

Hafþórsson represented Iceland at the 2018 European Golf Team Championships at Gleneagles, Scotland. He won the team gold together with Ólafía Þórunn Kristinsdóttir, Valdis Thora Jonsdottir and Axel Bóasson, and silver behind Spain in the men's event with Axel Bóasson.

== Professional wins (5) ==
=== Challenge Tour wins (1) ===
No.	Date	Tournament	Winning score	Margin of victory	Runners-up
1	3 Sep 2017	Cordon Golf Open	−18 (63-65-64=192) (Note: Shortened to 54 holes due to weather.)	7 strokes	(England) Matt Ford, (Italy) Andrea Pavan

=== Other wins (4) ===
- 1996 Icelandic National Golf Championship (as an amateur)
- 2003 Icelandic National Golf Championship
- 2004 Icelandic National Golf Championship
- 2010 Icelandic National Golf Championship

== Team appearances ==
Professional

- European Championships (representing Iceland): 2018 (winner – mixed team)

== See also ==
- 2006 European Tour Qualifying School graduates
- 2007 European Tour Qualifying School graduates
