= Francesco Laporta =

Italian professional golfer

Personal information
- Nationality: Italy
- Born: 10 October 1990 (age 36) Castellana Grotte, Italy
- Height: 5 ft 9 in (1.75 m)
- Weight: 11 st (150 lb; 70 kg)

Career
- Sport: Golf
- Turned professional: 2013
- Current tour: European Tour
- Former tours: Challenge Tour; Sunshine Tour
- Professional wins: 4

Number of wins by tour
- Challenge Tour: 3
- Other: 1

Best results in major championships
- Masters Tournament: DNP
- PGA Championship: DNP
- U.S. Open: DNP
- The Open Championship: CUT: 2026

Achievements and awards
- Challenge Tour Rankings winner: 2019
Medal record
European Golf Team Championships
Bronze medal – third place	2018 Gleneagles	Men's team

Francesco Laporta (born 10 October 1990) is an Italian professional golfer who plays on the European Tour. He won two tournaments on the 2019 Challenge Tour.

== Amateur career ==
Laporta started playing as a 13-year old at the San Domenico Golf in Brindisi and developed his amateur career in Italy and South Africa. After playing in a few professional tournaments in the Alps Tour as an amateur, he turned professional in 2013 on the Sunshine Tour.

== Professional career ==
Between 2013 and 2015 Laporta played full time in the Sunshine Tour, reaching his best career professional finish with a tie for second at the 2013 Zimbabwe Open where he also set a course record. At the end of 2015, Laporta earned his 2016 European Tour card at the Qualifying School.

Laporta's best result in the 2016 European Tour season came at the Trophée Hassan II where finished T-22, after leading the competition after two rounds. He lost his card at the end of the season after finishing 189th in the Order of Merit.

From 2017 to 2019 Laporta has played on the Challenge Tour. He finished 48 in the Order of Merit in 2017 and 52nd in 2018. His best finish in those two seasons was to be tied for third place in the 2017 Barclays Kenya Open. Laporta started 2019 well when he was runner-up in the opening event of the season, the Turkish Airlines Challenge, losing in a sudden-death playoff to Connor Syme. In October he finished tied for 7th place in the Italian Open to earn his biggest prize. The following week he won the Hainan Open, finishing a stroke ahead of Robin Roussel, a result that guaranteed him promotion to the European Tour for 2020. In November 2019 he won the Challenge Tour Grand Final, taking the Order of Merit title.

== Professional wins (4) ==
=== Challenge Tour wins (3) ===
Legend
Grand Finals (1)
Other Challenge Tour (2)

No.	Date	Tournament	Winning score	Margin of victory	Runner(s)-up
1	20 Oct 2019	Hainan Open^{1}	−14 (69-71-64-70=274)	1 stroke	(France) Robin Roussel
2	10 Nov 2019	Challenge Tour Grand Final	−6 (68-69-70-71=278)	2 strokes	(Germany) Sebastian Heisele, (France) Robin Sciot-Siegrist
3	23 Jul 2023	Big Green Egg German Challenge	−7 (69-70-70-72=281)	1 stroke	(England) Gary Boyd, (England) Ashley Chesters, (Germany) Dominic Foos, (Czech Republic) Jiří Zuska

^{1}Co-sanctioned by the China Tour

Challenge Tour playoff record (0–1)

No.	Year	Tournament	Opponent	Result
1	2019	Turkish Airlines Challenge	(Scotland) Connor Syme	Lost to birdie on first extra hole

=== Italian Pro Tour wins (1) ===
No.	Date	Tournament	Winning score	Margin of victory	Runner-up
1	13 Apr 2019	Italian National Open Championship	−16 (70-68-66-68=272)	4 strokes	(Italy) Carlo Casalegno

== Results in major championships ==
Tournament	2026
Masters Tournament	
PGA Championship	
U.S. Open	
The Open Championship	CUT

Did not play

CUT = missed the halfway cut

== Team appearances ==
Amateur

- European Amateur Team Championship (representing Italy): 2011

Professional

- European Championships (representing Italy): 2018

== See also ==
- 2015 European Tour Qualifying School graduates
- 2019 Challenge Tour graduates
- 2023 Challenge Tour graduates
