= Alessandro Tadini =

Italian professional golfer

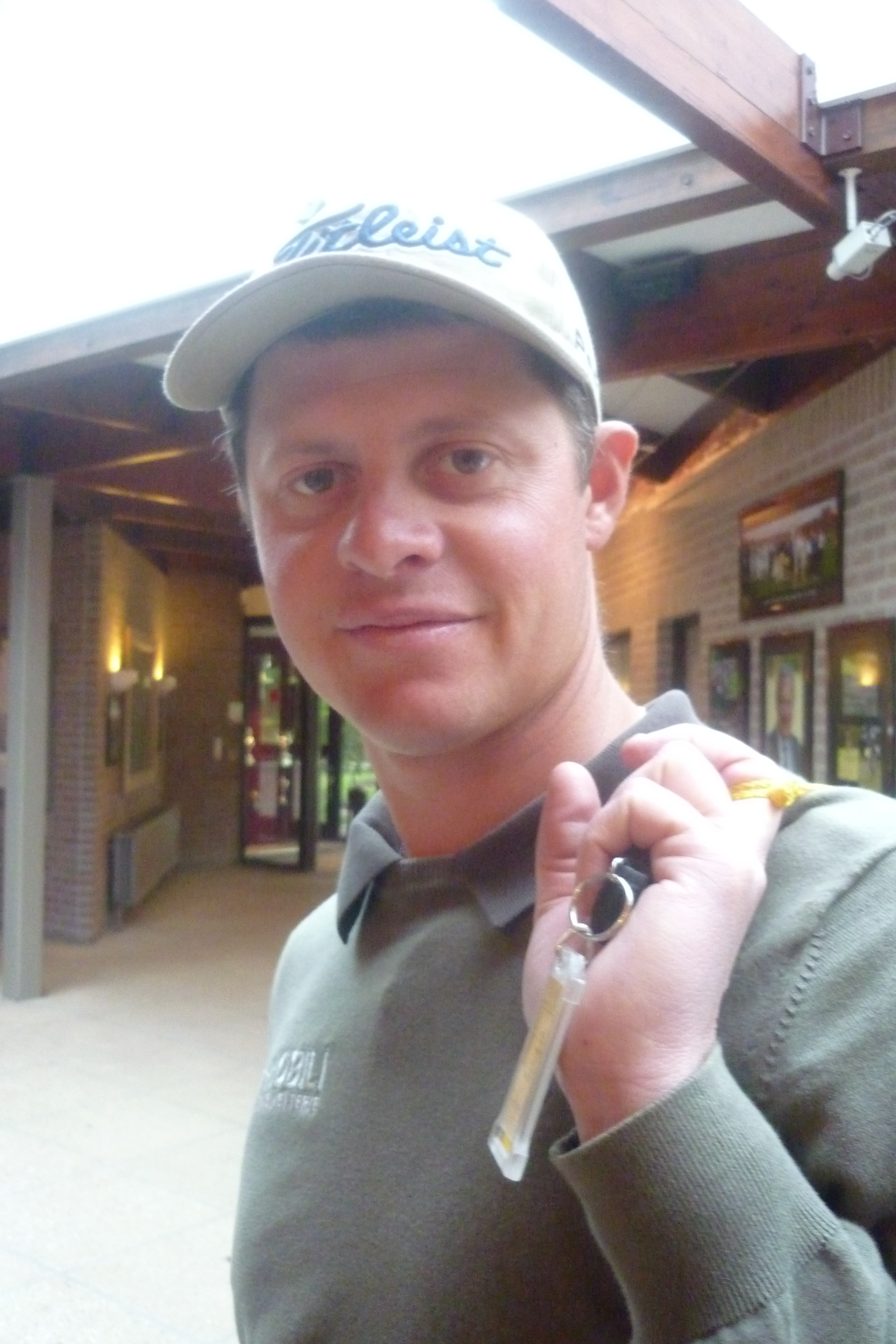

Personal information
- Nationality: Italy
- Born: 30 November 1973 (age 52) Borgomanero, Italy
- Height: 1.76 m (5 ft 9 in)
- Weight: 74 kg (163 lb; 11.7 st)

Career
- Sport: Golf
- Turned professional: 1994
- Current tour: Alps Tour
- Former tours: European Tour; Asian Tour; Challenge Tour
- Professional wins: 9

Number of wins by tour
- Challenge Tour: 4
- Other: 5
Medal record
European Golf Team Championships
Bronze medal – third place	2018 Gleneagles	Men's team

Alessandro Tadini (born 30 November 1973) is an Italian professional golfer.

== Career ==
Tadini was born in Borgomanero and turned professional in 1994. He qualified for the European Tour for 2003 after his sixth visit to qualifying school. He was unable to win enough money during his rookie season to retain his card and dropped down to the second tier Challenge Tour. In 2004 he finished second on the Challenge Tour Rankings to graduate back to the top level. He retained his card through the end of the 2007 season when he again fell back to the Challenge Tour. He bounced straight back, finishing in 7th place on the 2008 Challenge Tour Rankings, but was just outside the top 120 in the Race to Dubai in 2009 and was back on the Challenge Tour in 2010.

Tadini has won four time on the Challenge Tour, the first in 2004 at the Costa Rica Open, the second in 2008 at the Oceânico Group Pro-Am Challenge, the third in 2010 at the Credit Suisse Challenge, and the latest at the ECCO Tour Championship in 2012.

Tadini's best season to date on the European Tour was 2005, when he finished 98th, whilst his best result has been a runner-up finish in the dual-ranking 2004 Aa St Omer Open.

== Amateur wins ==
- 1994 Italian Amateur Stroke Play Championship

== Professional wins (9) ==
=== Challenge Tour wins (4) ===
No.	Date	Tournament	Winning score	Margin of victory	Runner(s)-up
1	22 Feb 2004	Costa Rica Open^{1}	−6 (72-68-68-70=278)	Playoff	(Spain) Carlos Quevedo
2	1 Jun 2008	Oceânico Group Pro-Am Challenge	−16 (64-64-67-69=264)	1 stroke	(Switzerland) Raphaël De Sousa
3	18 Jul 2010	Credit Suisse Challenge	−22 (69-68-64-65=266)	1 stroke	(Wales) Stuart Manley, (Norway) Marius Thorp
4	18 Aug 2012	ECCO Tour Championship^{2}	−12 (69-71-67-69=276)	Playoff	(England) James Busby

^{1}Co-sanctioned by the Tour de las Américas
^{2}Co-sanctioned by the Danish Golf Tour

Challenge Tour playoff record (2–0)

No.	Year	Tournament	Opponent	Result
1	2004	Costa Rica Open	(Spain) Carlos Quevedo	Won with birdie on third extra hole
2	2012	ECCO Tour Championship	(England) James Busby	Won with par on third extra hole

=== Italian Pro Tour wins (1) ===
No.	Date	Tournament	Winning score	Margin of victory	Runner-up
1	11 Apr 2015	Italian National Open Championship	−7 (74-69-68-70=281)	1 stroke	(Italy) Andrea Perrino

=== Other wins (4) ===
- 2002 Italian PGA Championship
- 2008 Italian PGA Championship
- 2009 Italian National Open
- 2012 Italian National Open

== Team appearances ==
Professional

- World Cup (representing Italy): 2004
- European Championships (representing Italy): 2018

== See also ==
- 2008 Challenge Tour graduates
- 2011 Challenge Tour graduates
- 2012 Challenge Tour graduates
- 2014 European Tour Qualifying School graduates
- List of golfers with most Challenge Tour wins
