= 2018 Women's British Open =

2018 Ricoh Women's British Open
Tournament information
- Dates: 2–5 August 2018
- Location: Lytham St Annes, Lancashire, England; 53.7496°N 3.0178°W
- Course: Royal Lytham & St Annes Golf Club
- Organized by: The R&A
- Tours: Ladies European Tour; LPGA Tour

Statistics
- Par: 72
- Length: 6,585 yards (6,021 m)
- Field: 144 players, 65 after cut
- Cut: 145 (+1)
- Prize fund: $3,250,000 €2,796,495
- Winner's share: $490,000 €421,625

Champion
- (England) Georgia Hall
- 271 (−17)
- Location in the United Kingdom Location in England

The 2018 Ricoh Women's British Open was played from 2–5 August in England at Royal Lytham & St Annes Golf Club Golf Links in Lancashire. It was the 43rd Women's British Open, the 18th as a major championship on the LPGA Tour, and the fifth at Royal Lytham & St Annes Golf Club.

Georgia Hall of England shot a final round 67 (−5) to win by two strokes over runner-up Pornanong Phatlum, the 54-hole leader. It was her first major title and she was the first British winner since Catriona Matthew in 2009. It was also the first win on tour (LPGA Tour or Ladies European Tour) for the 22-year-old Hall, the first English winner of the championship in 14 years.

The event was televised by Golf Channel and NBC Sports in the United States and Sky Sports in the United Kingdom.

== Course layout ==
Hole	Yards	Par	Hole	Yards	Par
1	179	3	10	334	4
2	424	4	11	540	5
3	429	4	12	157	3
4	371	4	13	340	4
5	186	3	14	429	4
6	492	5	15	464	5
7	539	5	16	333	4
8	389	4	17	425	4
9	144	3	18	410	4
Out	3,153	35	In	3,432	37
Source:		Total		6,585	72

Previous lengths of the course for the Women's British Open (since 2001):

- 2009: 6,492 yards (5,936 m), par 72
- 2006: 6,480 yards (5,925 m), par 72
- 2003: 6,308 yards (5,768 m), par 72

== Field ==
The field was 144 players, and most earned exemptions based on past performance on the Ladies European Tour, the LPGA Tour, previous major championships, or with a high ranking in the Women's World Golf Rankings. The rest of the field earned entry by successfully competing in qualifying tournaments open to any female golfer, professional or amateur, with a low handicap.

There were 18 exemption categories for the 2018 Women's British Open:

1. The top 15 finishers (and ties) from the 2017 Women's British Open.

Jodi Ewart Shadoff, Shanshan Feng (10), Georgia Hall (9), In-Kyung Kim (10,11), Kim Hyo-joo (10,12), Caroline Masson, Anna Nordqvist (10,12), Inbee Park (2,10,11,12), Lizette Salas (10), Jenny Shin, Michelle Wie (2,10,12), Angel Yin

- Stacy Lewis, Ai Suzuki (9,10), and Lexi Thompson (10,12) did not play.

2. The top 10 Ladies European Tour members in the Women's World Golf Rankings not exempt under (1).

Aditi Ashok (5), Carlota Ciganda (5,10), Sandra Gal (5), Charley Hull (5,10), Pernilla Lindberg (5,8,12), Azahara Muñoz (5), Su-Hyun Oh (5), Madelene Sagström (5)

- Karine Icher and Suzann Pettersen (12) did not play.

3. The top 30 LPGA Tour members in the Women's World Golf Rankings not exempt under (1) as of 3 July.

Marina Alex, Brittany Altomare, Chella Choi, Chun In-gee (10,12), Jacqui Concolino, Lindy Duncan, Austin Ernst, Nasa Hataoka (8,10), Brooke Henderson (8,10,12), Wei-Ling Hsu, Mi Jung Hur, Ji Eun-hee (8,10), Ariya Jutanugarn (8,10,11,12), Moriya Jutanugarn (8,10), Danielle Kang (10,12), Cristie Kerr (10), Kim Sei-young (8,10), Katherine Kirk, Ko Jin-young (8,10), Lydia Ko (8,10,12), Jessica Korda (8,10), Nelly Korda, Lee Mi-hyang, Minjee Lee (8,10), Mirim Lee, Brittany Lincicome (8,12), Park Sung-hyun (8,10,12), Ryu So-yeon (8,10,12), Jennifer Song, Amy Yang (10)

4. The top 25 on the current LET money list not exempt under (1) or (2) as of 3 July.

Rebecca Artis, Silvia Bañón, Céline Boutier (5,8), Ashleigh Buhai (5,8), Katie Burnett, Lynn Carlsson, Holly Clyburn, Olivia Cowan, Casey Danielson, Julia Engström, Jenny Haglund (8), Caroline Hedwall, Kylie Henry, Noemí Jiménez Martín, Valdis Thora Jonsdottir, Sarah Kemp, Karolin Lampert, Camilla Lennarth, Lin Xiyu, Meghan MacLaren (8), Florentyna Parker, Marianne Skarpnord, Klára Spilková, Anne Van Dam, Astrid Vayson de Pradenne (8), Christine Wolf

5. The top 40 on the current LPGA Tour money list not exempt under (1) or (3) as of 3 July.

Nicole Broch Larsen, Laura Davies, Hannah Green, Jaye Marie Green, Caroline Inglis, Megan Khang, Bronte Law, Lee Jeong-eun, Yu Liu, Mo Martin (11), Ally McDonald, Wichanee Meechai, Amy Olson, Ryann O'Toole, Annie Park (8), Park Hee-young, Jane Park, Pornanong Phatlum, Sherman Santiwiwatthanaphong, Sarah Jane Smith, Mariah Stackhouse, Angela Stanford, Emma Talley, Kris Tamulis, Ayako Uehara, Mariajo Uribe, Sakura Yokomine

6. The top five on the current LPGA of Japan Tour (JLPGA) money list not exempt under (1), (2), (3), or (12) as of 3 July.

Ahn Sun-ju, Mamiko Higa, Misuzu Narita, Eri Okayama, Phoebe Yao

- Jiyai Shin (8,10,11) and Erika Kikuchi did not play.

7. The top two on the current LPGA of Korea Tour (KLPGA) money list not exempt under (1), (2), (3), or (6) as of 3 July.

Choi Hye-jin (10)

- Oh Ji-hyun did not play.

8. Winners of any recognised LET or LPGA Tour events in the calendar year 2018.

Kanyalak Preedasuttijit, Thidapa Suwannapura

- Jang Ha-na did not play

9. Winners of the 2017 LET, LPGA, JLPGA and KLPGA money lists.

- Lee Jeong-eun (10) did not play.

10. The top 30 in the Women's World Golf Rankings, not exempt above as of 3 July.

11. Winners of the Women's British Open, under age 60, provided they are still active.

Catriona Matthew, Yani Tseng, Karrie Webb

12. Winners of the last five editions of the U.S. Women's Open, ANA Inspiration, and Women's PGA Championship, and The Evian Championship.

Brittany Lang

13. Winner of the 2017 Japan LPGA Tour Championship Ricoh Cup.

Teresa Lu

14. The leading five LPGA Tour members in the 2018 Marathon Classic who have entered the Championship and who are not otherwise exempt.

Daniela Darquea, Mina Harigae, Céline Herbin, Melissa Reid

Sandra Changkija did not play.

15. The leading three LET members in the 2018 Aberdeen Asset Management Ladies Scottish Open, who have entered the Championship and who are not otherwise exempt.

Nuria Iturrioz, Lee-Anne Pace, Cheyenne Woods

16. The 2018 Women's Amateur Asia-Pacific champion, 2018 British Ladies Amateur champion, 2017 U.S. Women's Amateur champion, 2017 European Ladies Amateur Championship champion, winner or next available player in the 2017 GB&I Order of Merit, and the Mark H. McCormack Medal holder provided they are still amateurs at the time of the Championship.

Leonie Harm, Agathe Laisné, Atthaya Thitikul

- Sophia Schubert did not play.
- Leona Maguire forfeited her exemption as Mark H. McCormack Medal holder by turning professional.

17. Any players granted special exemptions from qualifying by the Championship Committee.

Nanna Koerstz Madsen

18. Balance of the 90 LPGA Tour members.

None

Qualifiers: Laetitia Beck, Tonje Daffinrud, Ludovica Farina (a), Cloe Frankish, Rachael Goodall, Linn Grant (a), Lydia Hall, Tiffany Joh, Haeji Kang, Frida Kinhult (a), Brittany Marchand, Inci Mehmet, Hollie Muse (a), Robynn Ree, Pannarat Thanapolboonyaras, Sideri Vanova, Ursula Wikström

== Round summaries ==
=== First round ===
Thursday, 2 August 2018

Minjee Lee shot a 7-under-par 65 to lead by one stroke over Mamiko Higa. Defending champion In-Kyung Kim shot a 1-under-par 71.

Place	Player	Score	To par
1	(Australia) Minjee Lee	65	−7
2	(Japan) Mamiko Higa	66	−6
T3	(England) Georgia Hall	67	−5
T3	(South Korea) Lee Mi-hyang	67	−5
T3	(Taiwan) Teresa Lu	67	−5
T3	(South Korea) Park Sung-hyun	67	−5
T3	(Thailand) Pornanong Phatlum	67	−5
T8	(Germany) Sandra Gal	68	−4
T8	(United States) Mina Harigae	68	−4
T8	(New Zealand) Lydia Ko	68	−4

=== Second round ===
Friday, 3 August 2018

Place	Player	Score	To par
1	(Thailand) Pornanong Phatlum	67-67=134	−10
T2	(England) Georgia Hall	67-68=135	−9
T2	(Japan) Mamiko Higa	66-69=135	−9
T2	(Australia) Minjee Lee	65-70=135	−9
5	(Taiwan) Teresa Lu	67-69=136	−8
6	(South Korea) Park Sung-hyun	67-70=137	−7
7	(South Korea) Ryu So-yeon	69-69=138	−6
T8	(United States) Mina Harigae	68-71=139	−5
T8	(Canada) Brooke Henderson	69-70=139	−5
T8	(New Zealand) Lydia Ko	68-71=139	−5
T8	(Sweden) Pernilla Lindberg	71-68=139	−5
T8	(England) Florentyna Parker	69-70=139	−5
T8	(Sweden) Madelene Sagström	69-70=139	−5

=== Third round ===
Saturday, 4 August 2018

Place	Player	Score	To par
1	(Thailand) Pornanong Phatlum	67-67-69=203	−13
2	(England) Georgia Hall	67-68-69=204	−12
3	(South Korea) Ryu So-yeon	69-69-67=205	−11
T4	(Japan) Mamiko Higa	66-69-71=206	−10
T4	(Australia) Minjee Lee	65-70-71=206	−10
T4	(South Korea) Park Sung-hyun	67-70-69=206	−10
T7	(United States) Mina Harigae	68-71-69=208	−8
T7	(Canada) Brooke Henderson	69-70-69=208	−8
T9	(New Zealand) Lydia Ko	68-71-70=209	−7
T9	(Taiwan) Teresa Lu	67-69-73=209	−7
T9	(Taiwan) Phoebe Yao	71-71-67=209	−7
T9	(China) Yu Liu	69-72-68=209	−7

=== Final round ===
Sunday, 5 August 2018

Place	Player	Score	To par	Money (US$)
1	(England) Georgia Hall	67-68-69-67=271	−17	490,000
2	(Thailand) Pornanong Phatlum	67-67-69-70=273	−15	300,388
3	(South Korea) Ryu So-yeon	69-69-67-70=275	−13	217,910
T4	(Japan) Mamiko Higa	66-69-71-73=279	−9	138,420
T4	(South Korea) Kim Sei-young	71-71-71-66=279	−9	138,420
T4	(Thailand) Ariya Jutanugarn	71-70-69-69=279	−9	138,420
T7	(Spain) Carlota Ciganda	69-73-68-70=280	−8	82,505
T7	(China) Shanshan Feng	71-71-69-69=280	−8	82,505
T7	(China) Yu Liu	69-72-68-71=280	−8	82,505
10	(Australia) Minjee Lee	65-70-71-75=281	−7	66,606

==== Scorecard ====
Final round

Hole	1	2	3	4	5	6	7	8	9	10	11	12	13	14	15	16	17	18
Par	3	4	4	4	3	5	5	4	3	4	5	3	4	4	5	4	4	4
(England) Hall	−13	−13	−13	−14	−14	−15	−15	−15	−15	−15	−15	−15	−16	−16	−17	−18	−18	−17
(Thailand) Phatlum	−13	−14	−14	−15	−16	−17	−17	−16	−16	−16	−16	−16	−16	−16	−17	−17	−15	−15
(South Korea) Ryu	−11	−11	−8	−7	−8	−9	−10	−10	−10	−9	−10	−11	−12	−12	−13	−13	−13	−13
(Japan) Higa	−10	−10	−9	−9	−9	−10	−9	−8	−8	−8	−9	−9	−10	−8	−9	−9	−9	−9
(Thailand) Jutanugarn	−6	−6	−7	−6	−7	−8	−8	−8	−8	−8	−7	−7	−7	−6	−7	−8	−8	−9
(South Korea) Kim	−4	−4	−4	−4	−4	−4	−5	−5	−5	−6	−7	−8	−9	−8	−9	−10	−10	−9
(Australia) Lee	−10	−10	−10	−10	−10	−11	−10	−10	−10	−10	−10	−9	−9	−9	−8	−7	−7	−7
(South Korea) Park	−10	−10	−10	−8	−6	−7	−6	−6	−6	−6	−6	−6	−6	−6	−6	−6	−5	−5

Cumulative tournament scores, relative to par

Birdie	Bogey	Double bogey	Triple bogey+
