= 2019 Challenge Tour =

Golf tour season

2019 Challenge Tour season
- Duration: 25 April 2019 – 10 November 2019
- Number of official events: 24
- Most wins: (Scotland) Calum Hill (2) (Italy) Francesco Laporta (2) (France) Antoine Rozner (2)
- Rankings: (Italy) Francesco Laporta

The 2019 Challenge Tour was the 31st season of the Challenge Tour, the official development tour to the European Tour.

== Schedule ==
The following table lists official events during the 2019 season.

Date	Tournament	Host country	Purse (€)	Winner (Note: The number in brackets after each winner's name is the number of Challenge Tour events they had won up to and including that tournament. This information is only shown for Challenge Tour members. It is rare for someone to accumulate many wins on the Challenge Tour as success at this level usually leads to promotion to the European Tour.)	OWGR points	Other tours (Note: CHN − China Tour; EST − European Senior Tour; LET − Ladies European Tour.)	Notes
28 Apr	Turkish Airlines Challenge	Turkey	200,000	(Scotland) Connor Syme (1)	12		
5 May	Challenge de España	Spain	200,000	(France) Antoine Rozner (1)	12		
12 May	Prague Golf Challenge	Czech Republic	200,000	(France) Antoine Rozner (2)	12		
26 May	D+D Real Czech Challenge	Czech Republic	200,000	(England) Ross McGowan (3)	12		
9 Jun	Swiss Challenge	Switzerland	185,000	(Portugal) Ricardo Santos (3)	12		
16 Jun	Hauts de France – Pas de Calais Golf Open	France	190,000	(France) Robin Roussel (1)	12		
23 Jun	Andalucía Costa del Sol Match Play 9	Spain	200,000	(Norway) Eirik Tage Johansen (1)	12		
30 Jun	Italian Challenge Open Eneos Motor Oil	Italy	300,000	(England) Matthew Jordan (1)	12		
7 Jul	D+D Real Slovakia Challenge	Slovakia	200,000	(Wales) Rhys Enoch (1)	12		
14 Jul	Le Vaudreuil Golf Challenge	France	210,000	(England) Steven Tiley (1)	12		
21 Jul	Euram Bank Open	Austria	185,000	(Scotland) Calum Hill (2)	12		
4 Aug	Vierumäki Finnish Challenge	Finland	200,000	(Portugal) José-Filipe Lima (5)	12		
10 Aug	Made in Denmark Challenge	Denmark	200,000	(Scotland) Calum Hill (3)	12		
18 Aug	ISPS Handa World Invitational	Northern Ireland	US$250,000	(England) Jack Senior (2)	12		New tournament
24 Aug	Rolex Trophy	Switzerland	290,000	(Netherlands) Darius van Driel (2)	12		
1 Sep	KPMG Trophy	Belgium	185,000	(England) Dale Whitnell (1)	12		
8 Sep	Open de Bretagne	France	200,000	(Germany) Sebastian Heisele (1)	12		
15 Sep	Open de Portugal	Portugal	200,000	(Poland) Adrian Meronk (1)	12		
29 Sep	Hopps Open de Provence	France	200,000	(Netherlands) Lars van Meijel (1)	12		
6 Oct	Lalla Aïcha Challenge Tour	Morocco	200,000	(Wales) Oliver Farr (3)	12		New tournament
13 Oct	Stone Irish Challenge	Ireland	200,000	(Spain) Emilio Cuartero (1)	12		
20 Oct	Hainan Open	China	US$350,000	(Italy) Francesco Laporta (1)	13	CHN	
27 Oct	Foshan Open	China	US$500,000	(China) Bai Zhengkai (n/a)	13	CHN	
10 Nov	Challenge Tour Grand Final	Spain	420,000	(Italy) Francesco Laporta (2)	17		Flagship event

=== Unofficial events ===
The following events were sanctioned by the Challenge Tour, but did not carry official money, nor were wins official.

Date	Tournament	Host country	Purse (€)	Winner	OWGR points	Other tours	Notes
6 Apr	Jordan Mixed Open	Jordan	US$393,000	(Netherlands) Daan Huizing	n/a	EST, LET	New mixed event

== Rankings ==
The rankings were titled as the Road to Mallorca and were based on tournament results during the season, calculated using a points-based system. The top 15 players on the rankings earned status to play on the 2020 European Tour.

Rank	Player	Points
1	(Italy) Francesco Laporta	210,132
2	(Scotland) Calum Hill	146,834
3	(England) Richard Bland	142,402
4	(Germany) Sebastian Heisele	130,406
5	(Poland) Adrian Meronk	128,908
