= Italian PGA Championship =

Tournament information
- Location: Monterosi, Italy
- Established: 1977
- Courses: Terre dei Consoli Golf Club & Resort
- Par: 72
- Length: 6,885 metres (7,530 yd)
- Format: Stroke play
- Prize fund: €30,000
- Month played: July

Current champion
- (Italy) Andrea Saracino

The Italian PGA Championship is a golf tournament organised by the Professional Golfers' Association of Italy. It was first played in 1977.

The 2016 event, the 40th Championship, was won by Andrea Rota who beat Matteo Delpodio in a playoff.

== Winners ==
Year	Winner	Venue	Runner(s)-up
2025	(Italy) Andrea Saracino	Terre dei Consoli	(Italy) Federico Maccario
2024	(Italy) Marco Florioli	Golf Nazionale	(Italy) Manfredi Manica (Italy) Andrea Romano
2023	(Italy) Jacopo Vecchi Fossa	Golf del Ducato (La Rocca)	(Italy) Gregorio De Leo
2022	(Italy) Gregorio De Leo	Golf del Ducato (La Rocca)	(Italy) Federico Maccario (Italy) Stefano Mazzoli
2021	(Italy) Stefano Mazzoli	Golf del Ducato (La Rocca)	(Italy) Edoardo Giletta
2020	Not held due to the Covid-19 pandemic		
2019	(Italy) Jacopo Vecchi Fossa	Antognolla	(Italy) Luca Cianchetti
2018	(Italy) Luca Cianchetti	Castelgandolfo	(Italy) Pietro Ricci (Italy) Leonardo Sbarigia
2017	(Italy) Joon Kim	Castelgandolfo	(United States) Zeke Martinez (Italy) Leonardo Sbarigia
2016	(Italy) Andrea Rota	Villa Carolina	(Italy) Matteo Delpodio
2015	(Italy) Andrea Perrino	Montecchia	(Italy) Cristiano Terragni
2014	(Italy) Andrea Maestroni	Montecchia	(Italy) Alessio Bruschi
2013	(Italy) Alessio Bruschi	San Domenico	(Italy) Andrea Zanini
2012	(Italy) Andrea Zanini	Colline del Gavi	(Italy) Andrea Rota
2011	(Italy) Andrea Maestroni	Margara	(Italy) Andrea Zanini
2010	(Italy) Lorenzo Gagli	Margara	(Italy) Federico Colombo
2009	(Italy) Francesco Molinari	Margara	(Italy) Gregory Molteni
2008	(Italy) Alessandro Tadini	Margara	(Italy) Emanuele Canonica
2007	(Italy) Marco Crespi	Sanremo	(Italy) Emanuele Canonica
2006	(Italy) Andrea Basciu	Sanremo	(Italy) Costantino Rocca
2005	(Italy) Marco Crespi	Sanremo	(Italy) Michele Reale
2004	(Italy) Gregory Molteni	Bergamo	(Italy) Gianluca Baruffalsi
2003	(Italy) Federico Bisazza	San Domenico	(Italy) Alessandro Tadini
2002	(Italy) Alessandro Tadini	Is Molas	(Italy) Massimo Florioli
2001	(Italy) Gianluca Baruffaldi	Is Molas	(Italy) Alessandro Tadini
2000	(Italy) Francesco Guermani	Is Molas	(Italy) Marco Soffietti
1999	(Italy) Marco Bernardini	Is Molas	(Italy) Alessandro Napoleoni
1998	(Italy) Stefano Soffietti	Is Molas	(Italy) Federico Bisazza
1997	(Italy) Mario Tadini	Albarella	(Italy) Andrea Canessa
1996	(Spain) José Luis Gallardo	Albarella	(Italy) Alessandro Tadini
1995	(Italy) Andrea Canessa	Albarella	(Italy) Emanuele Canonica
1994	(Italy) Massimo Florioli	Albarella	(Italy) Emanuele Canonica
1993	(Italy) Massimo Florioli	Albarella	(Italy) Michele Reale
1992	(Italy) Michele Reale	Albarella	(Italy) Giorgio Merletti
1991	(Italy) Andrea Canessa	Albarella	(Italy) Marco Durante
1990	(Italy) Massimo Mannelli	Albarella	(Italy) Andrea Canessa
1989	(Italy) Costantino Rocca	Albarella	(Italy) Emanuele Bolognesi
1988	(Italy) Giuseppe Calì	Albarella	(Italy) Costantino Rocca
1987	(Italy) Silvio Grappasonni	Albarella	(Italy) Alberto Binaghi
1986	(Italy) Renato Campagnoli	Albarella	(Italy) Stefano Betti
1985	(Italy) Gerolamo Delfino	Albarella	(Italy) Costantino Rocca
1984	(Italy) Giuseppe Calì	Molinetto	(Italy) Massimo Mannelli
1983	(Italy) Baldovino Dassù	Albarella	(Italy) Massimo Mannelli
1982	(Italy) Aldo Trillini	Albarella	(Italy) Alberto Croce
1981	(Italy) Alberto Croce	Albarella	(Italy) Angelo Croce
1980	(Italy) Dino Canonica	Bergamo	(Italy) Silvano Locatelli
1979	(Italy) Alberto Croce	Bergamo	(Italy) Delio Lovato
1978	(Italy) Alberto Croce	Le Fronde	(Italy) Aldo Trillini
1977	(Italy) Roberto Bernardini	Le Fronde	(Italy) Silvano Locatelli
