= Camille Chevalier =

French professional golfer

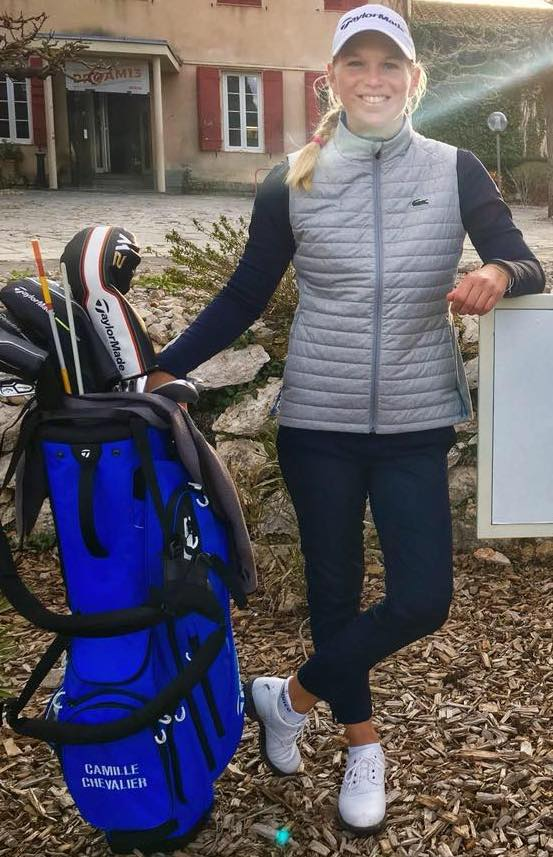

Personal information
- Nationality: France
- Born: 19 December 1993 (age 32) Marseille, France
- Height: 1.68 m (5 ft 6 in)

Career
- Sport: Golf
- College: Indiana University Bloomington
- Turned professional: 2017
- Current tour: Ladies European Tour
- Former tour: Symetra Tour
- Professional wins: 1

Number of wins by tour
- Ladies European Tour: 1

Best results in LPGA major championships
- Chevron Championship: DNP
- Women's PGA C'ship: DNP
- U.S. Women's Open: DNP
- Women's British Open: DNP
- Evian Championship: CUT: 2018

Achievements and awards
- LET Rookie of the Year: 2017

Camille Chevalier (born 19 December 1993) is a French professional golfer playing on the Ladies European Tour since January 2017.

== Amateur career ==
Chevalier played college golf at Indiana University Bloomington and graduated in May 2016 with a degree in Liberal Studies and a Business Certificate from the Kelley School of Business. Her college career highlights included winning the Lady Buckeye Invitational in April 2016, holding the Indiana University record for lowest individual total score in program history, tying the Indiana University record for lowest single round and posting the best single-season scoring average in Indiana history. Regarding academics, she earned WGCA All-American Scholar honors for three straight years (3.7 or higher cumulative GPA).

== Professional career ==
In December 2016, Chevalier earned full status in Qualifying School to play on the Ladies European Tour. During her first season, she secured her maiden professional win at the Hero Women's Indian Open, finished 10th of the Order of Merit, and became the 2017 Rookie of the Year.

In 2018, Chevalier played on both the Symetra Tour and the Ladies European Tour. Her season highlights included a top 10 finish in the Andalucia Costa Del Sol Open De España Femenino and a cut made in her first major, the Evian Championship.

In 2019, Chevalier came back to play full-time on the Ladies European Tour. Her season highlight included a third place at La Reserva de Sotogrande Invitational.

== Professional wins ==
=== Ladies European Tour wins (1) ===
No.	Date	Tournament	Winning score	To par	Margin of victory	Runner-up	Winner's share (€)
1	12 Nov 2017	Hero Women's Indian Open	68-69-67=204	−12	1 stroke	Michele Thomson	51,637
