= Meghan MacLaren =

English professional golfer (born 1994)

Personal information
- Nationality: England
- Born: 15 May 1994 (age 32) Wellingborough, England
- Height: 5 ft 10 in (1.78 m)

Career
- Sport: Golf
- College: Florida International University
- Turned professional: 2016
- Current tour: Ladies European Tour
- Former tours: Symetra Tour; LET Access Series
- Professional wins: 7

Number of wins by tour
- Ladies European Tour: 3
- WPGA Tour of Australasia: 3
- Epson Tour: 1
- Other: 3

Best results in LPGA major championships
- Chevron Championship: DNP
- Women's PGA C'ship: DNP
- U.S. Women's Open: CUT: 2017, 2020
- Women's British Open: 63rd: 2018
- Evian Championship: CUT: 2018, 2019, 2022, 2023

Achievements and awards
- Sun Belt Conference Freshman of the Year: 2013
- Conference USA Golfer of the Year: 2015
- LET Access Series Order of Merit: 2017
Medal record
Representing Great Britain
European Golf Team Championships
Bronze medal – third place	2018 Gleneagles	Women's team
Silver medal – second place	2018 Gleneagles	Mixed team

Meghan MacLaren (born 15 May 1994) is an English professional golfer and Ladies European Tour player.

== Early life and amateur career ==
MacLaren starting playing golf at age 4 and attended The Ferrers Specialists Arts College between 2005 and 12, where she earned the Young Sportswoman of the Year award in 2009 and Upper School Sportsperson of the Year in 2010.

She enrolled at Florida International University in 2012 and played with the FIU Panthers women's golf team. She won eight times before graduating with a degree in English in 2016. She was Sun Belt Conference Freshman of the Year in 2013 and Conference USA Golfer of the Year in 2015.

MacLaren had a successful amateur career and won the 2013 Irish Women’s Open Amateur Stroke Play Championship and the 2014 Ladies' British Open Amateur Stroke Play Championship, while representing country or continent in the 2016 Curtis Cup, 2016 Espirito Santo Trophy and Patsy Hankins Trophy.

She won the Santander Golf Tour LETAS La Peñaza, final LET Access Series tournament of 2016, while still an amateur.

== Professional career ==
MacLaren turned professional in late 2016 and at Q-School earned a spot on the 2017 LET Access Series, where she won the Azores Ladies Open and had seven top-10 finishes. She topped the Order of Merit, earning a full card for the 2018 Ladies European Tour. In her rookie season, she secured her maiden victory at the Women's NSW Open in Australia, and medalled twice at the 2018 European Golf Team Championships.

In 2019, she recorded a runner-up finish behind Challenge Tour player Daan Huizing in the Jordan Mixed Open, a third place in the Jabra Ladies Open, and successfully defended her Women's NSW Open title, to finish fifth on the Order of Merit.

In 2021, MacLaren mainly played on the Epson Tour in the United States where she won the Prasco Charity Championship. She returned to LET Q-School for 2022 and finished in the top-20 to rejoin the LET. In 2022, she lost playoffs at the Open de France Dames and the Ladies Italian Open. She won her third LET title in Australia, the Australian Ladies Classic – Bonville, ending the season seventh in the Order of Merit.

== Amateur wins ==
- 2012 Wolverine Invitational, FIU Pat Bradley Invitational
- 2013 Irish Women's Open Amateur Stroke Play Championship, Sun Belt Conference Championship
- 2014 Ladies' British Open Amateur Stroke Play Championship, Mary Fossum Invitational
- 2015 Amelia Island Collegiate, Mountain View Collegiate, Conference USA Championship

== Professional wins (7) ==
=== Ladies European Tour wins (3) ===
No.	Date	Tournament	Winning score	To par	Margin of victory	Runner(s)-up
1	4 Mar 2018	Women's NSW Open^	71-67-65-71=274	−10	2 strokes	(Spain) Silvia Banon
2	10 Mar 2019	Women's NSW Open^	70-66-67-69=272	−12	3 strokes	(New Zealand) Munchin Keh (Sweden) Lynn Carlsson
3	24 Apr 2022	Australian Ladies Classic – Bonville^	67-70-69=206	−10	1 stroke	(Sweden) Maja Stark

^Co-sanctioned with the WPGA Tour of Australasia

Ladies European Tour playoff record (0–2)

No.	Year	Tournament	Opponent(s)	Result
1	2022	Ladies Italian Open	(Italy) Alessandra Fanali (a) (Switzerland) Morgane Métraux	Métraux won with eagle on first extra hole
2	2022	Open de France Dames	(Morocco) Ines Laklalech	Lost to par on first extra hole

=== Symetra Tour wins (1) ===
No.	Date	Tournament	Winning score	To par	Margin of victory	Runner(s)-up
1	27 Jun 2021	Prasco Charity Championship	68-70-69=207	−9	2 strokes	(Sweden) Linnea Johansson (China) Zhang Weiwei

=== LET Access Series (2) ===
No.	Date	Tournament	Winning score	To par	Margin of victory	Runner(s)-up
1	22 Oct 2016	Santander Golf Tour LETAS La Peñaza (as an amateur)	69-68-66=213	−3	2 strokes	(Austria) Sarah Schober
2	23 Apr 2017	Azores Ladies Open	70-70-74=214	−2	2 strokes	(France) Eva Gilly (Wales) Chloe Williams

=== Other wins (1) ===
- 2020 Rose Ladies Series – Event 2

== Team appearances ==
Amateur

- Girls Home Internationals (representing England): 2011 (winners), 2012 (winners)
- European Girls' Team Championship (representing England): 2012
- European Ladies' Team Championship (representing England): 2014, 2015, 2016 (winners)
- Women's Home Internationals (representing England): 2016 (winners)
- Patsy Hankins Trophy (representing Europe): 2016
- Curtis Cup (representing Great Britain & Ireland): 2016 (winners)
- Espirito Santo Trophy (representing England): 2016

Professional

- European Championships (representing Great Britain): 2018
