= Silvia Bañón =

Spanish professional golfer

Personal information
- Full name: Silvia Bañón Ibáñez
- Nationality: Spain
- Born: 21 October 1992 (age 34) Alicante, Spain
- Height: 5 ft 9 in (1.75 m)

Career
- Sport: Golf
- Turned professional: 2016
- Current tour: Ladies European Tour (joined 2018)
- Former tour: LET Access Series (joined 2016)
- Professional wins: 2

Best results in LPGA major championships
- Chevron Championship: DNP
- Women's PGA C'ship: DNP
- U.S. Women's Open: DNP
- Women's British Open: CUT: 2018
- Evian Championship: DNP

Silvia Bañón (born 21 October 1992) is a Spanish professional golfer and member of the Ladies European Tour (LET). She won the 2014 Portuguese Ladies Amateur and finished runner-up in the 2018 New South Wales Women's Open.

== Amateur career ==
In 2012, Bañón won the Campeonato de Alicante and was runner-up at the German Ladies Amateur, behind Céline Boutier. In 2014, she won the Portuguese Ladies Amateur and finished third at the 2014 World University Golf Championship in Crans-Montana, Switzerland, behind Tiffany Chan and Marta Sanz. She won the Campeonato de Espana Universitario de Golf in 2015 and 2016.

== Professional career ==
Bañón turned professional in 2016 and started playing on the LET Access Series. In 2017, she was third in the Belfius Ladies Open and the Ribeira Sacra Patrimonio de la Humanidad International Ladies Open, and finished 10th on the LETAS Order of Merit.

In 2018, Bañón was runner-up in the New South Wales Women's Open at Coffs Harbour Golf Club, two strokes behind Meghan MacLaren, and finished 26th in the LET Order of Merit. She made her major debut in the 2018 Women's British Open at Royal Lytham & St Annes Golf Club where she did not make the cut. In 2019, she was consistent and made 14 cuts in 16 LET starts.

Bañón sustained an injury to her arm and only made three appearances in 2020 but delivered one top-10, a 9th at the VP Bank Swiss Ladies Open.

== Amateur wins ==
- 2012 Campeonato de Alicante
- 2013 Grand Prix des Landes
- 2014 Portuguese Ladies Amateur
- 2015 Campeonato de Espana Universitario de Golf
- 2016 Campeonato de Espana Universitario de Golf

== Professional wins (2) ==
=== Santander Golf Tour wins (2) ===
- 2017: Santander Golf Tour Barcelona
- 2019: Santander Golf Tour Sevilla (with Noemí Jiménez)

== Results in LPGA majors ==
Results not in chronological order.

Tournament	2018
ANA Inspiration	
U.S. Women's Open	
Women's PGA Championship	
The Evian Championship	
Women's British Open	CUT

Did not play

CUT = missed the half-way cut
NT = No tournament

== Team appearances ==
Professional

- European Championships (representing Spain): 2018
