= Connor Syme =

Scottish professional golfer

Personal information
- Full name: Connor David Syme
- Nationality: Scotland
- Born: 11 July 1995 (age 31) Kirkcaldy, Scotland

Career
- Sport: Golf
- Turned professional: 2017
- Current tour: European Tour
- Professional wins: 2

Number of wins by tour
- European Tour: 1
- Challenge Tour: 1

Best results in major championships
- Masters Tournament: DNP
- PGA Championship: DNP
- U.S. Open: CUT: 2020
- The Open Championship: CUT: 2017, 2019, 2023
Medal record
Representing Great Britain
European Golf Team Championships
Silver medal – second place	2018 Gleneagles	Mixed team

Connor David Syme (born 11 July 1995) is a Scottish professional golfer. He won the 2025 KLM Open on the European Tour.

== Amateur career ==
Syme won the 2016 Australian Amateur championship. He was also medalist at the 2014 Amateur Championship at Royal Porthcawl and Pyle and Kenfig Golf Club where he shot a bogey-free 68 (−3) in round two to come out on top. He was top points scorer in Scotland's successful defence of the European Team Championship. He also represented Scotland at the Eisenhower Trophy where they led after day one. He helped retain the St Andrews Trophy representing Great Britain and Ireland men's team. He played in the 2017 Walker Cup, at which time he was number 8 on the World Amateur Golf Ranking.

Syme was a member at Drumoig Golf Centre in Fife, Scotland. He is coached by his father, Stuart, who was also a member of the Scotland, Great Britain and Ireland teams.

== Professional career ==
Syme turned professional after playing in the 2017 Walker Cup, signing with Modest Golf Management. He made his pro debut at the Portugal Masters on the European Tour. He finished in a tie for 12th after carding four successive under-par rounds. He had only three bogeys the entire week. Syme finished tied for 9th place in the 2017 European Tour Qualifying School to gain a place on the tour for 2018.

In June 2018, Syme was second in the Shot Clock Masters, his best finish in a European Tour event. This was his only top-10 finish of the 2018 season and he lost his card for 2019. Syme played on the 2019 Challenge Tour. In May he won the Turkish Airlines Challenge, the opening event of the season. In a playoff with Francesco Laporta he won with a birdie 3 at the first extra hole. He finished the season 14th in the Order of Merit to return to the European Tour for 2020.

== Amateur wins ==
- 2013 Scottish Junior Tour 2
- 2014 North East District Open Amateur
- 2016 Australian Amateur
- 2017 Battle Trophy

== Professional wins (2) ==
=== European Tour wins (1) ===
No.	Date	Tournament	Winning score	Margin of victory	Runner-up
1	8 Jun 2025	KLM Open	−11 (65-72-66-70=273)	2 strokes	(Sweden) Joakim Lagergren

=== Challenge Tour wins (1) ===
No.	Date	Tournament	Winning score	Margin of victory	Runner-up
1	28 Apr 2019	Turkish Airlines Challenge	−23 (65-67-66-67=265)	Playoff	(Italy) Francesco Laporta

Challenge Tour playoff record (1–0)

No.	Year	Tournament	Opponent	Result
1	2019	Turkish Airlines Challenge	(Italy) Francesco Laporta	Won with birdie on first extra hole

== Results in major championships ==
Results not in chronological order in 2020.

Tournament	2017	2018
Masters Tournament		
U.S. Open		
The Open Championship	CUT	
PGA Championship		

Tournament	2019	2020	2021	2022	2023
Masters Tournament					
PGA Championship					
U.S. Open		CUT			
The Open Championship	CUT	NT			CUT

Did not play

CUT = missed the half-way cut
"T" = tied for place
NT = No tournament due to COVID-19 pandemic

== Team appearances ==
Amateur

- European Boys' Team Championship (representing Scotland): 2013
- Boys Home Internationals (representing Scotland): 2013
- Jacques Léglise Trophy (representing Great Britain & Ireland): 2013 (winners)
- European Amateur Team Championship (representing Scotland): 2015 (winners), 2016 (winners), 2017
- Men's Home Internationals (representing Scotland): 2015
- St Andrews Trophy (representing Great Britain & Ireland): 2016 (tie)
- Eisenhower Trophy (representing Scotland): 2016
- Walker Cup (representing Great Britain & Ireland): 2017

Professional

- European Championships (representing Great Britain): 2018

== See also ==
- 2017 European Tour Qualifying School graduates
- 2019 Challenge Tour graduates
