= Women's NSW Open =

Coordinates: 32.1523°S 152.498°E

Tournament information
- Location: New South Wales, Australia
- Established: 2006
- Course: Wollongong Golf Club
- Par: 72
- Tours: WPGA Tour of Australasia; Ladies European Tour
- Format: Stroke play
- Prize fund: A$600,000
- Month played: March

Current champion
- (France) Agathe Laisné

Final champion
- Location in Australia Location in New South Wales

The Women's NSW Open (Women's New South Wales Open) is a women's professional golf tournament held in New South Wales, Australia. It was first played on the ALPG Tour in 2006. Beginning in 2018, the tournament was co-sanctioned by the Ladies European Tour.

It was held at Oatlands Golf Club until 2018, when it moved to Coffs Harbour Golf Club and started rotating. Players compete for the Jan Stephenson Trophy, named after NSW native Jan Stephenson.

== Winners ==
Year	Tour(s) (Note: ALPG − ALPG Tour; LET − Ladies European Tour; WPGA − WPGA Tour of Australasia.)	Winner	Score	Margin of victory	Runner(s)-up	WWGR points	Venue
Ford Women's NSW Open
2026	WPGA · LET	(France) Agathe Laisné	−16	1 stroke	(Thailand) April Angurasaranee (South Korea) Oh Soo-min	9.00	Wollongong
2025	WPGA · LET	(England) Mimi Rhodes	−17	2 strokes	(Italy) Alessandra Fanali (Australia) Kirsten Rudgeley	12	Wollongong
Women's NSW Open
2024	WPGA · LET	(Colombia) Mariajo Uribe	−14	1 stroke	(England) Bronte Law	12	Magenta
2023	WPGA	(New Zealand) Momoka Kobori	−8	Playoff	(Australia) Claire Shin (a)	−	Tuncurry
2022	WPGA · LET	(Sweden) Maja Stark	−15	5 strokes	(Sweden) Johanna Gustavsson	5	Coolangatta & Tweed Heads
2021	No tournament						
2020	ALPG · LET	(Sweden) Julia Engström	−14	2 strokes	(Belgium) Manon De Roey	6	Dubbo
2019	ALPG · LET	(England) Meghan MacLaren (2)	−12	3 strokes	(Sweden) Lynn Carlsson (New Zealand) Munchin Keh	6	Queanbeyan
2018	ALPG · LET	(England) Meghan MacLaren	−10	2 strokes	(Spain) Silvia Banon (United States) Casey Danielson	6	Coffs Harbour
2016–17: No tournament
Bing Lee Fujitsu NSW Women's Open
2015	ALPG	(England) Holly Clyburn	−11	1 stroke	(Australia) Rebecca Artis (Switzerland) Fabienne In-Albon (Scotland) Vikki Laing (Austria) Christine Wolf	15	Oatlands
Bing Lee Fujitsu General Women's NSW Open
2014	ALPG	(France) Joanna Klatten	−16	3 strokes	(Australia) Nikki Campbell	15	Oatlands
Bing Lee Samsung Women's NSW Open
2013	ALPG	(Sweden) Caroline Hedwall (2)	−13	2 strokes	(New Zealand) Lydia Ko	15	Oatlands
2012	ALPG	(New Zealand) Lydia Ko	−14	4 strokes	(Wales) Becky Morgan		Oatlands
2011	ALPG	(Sweden) Caroline Hedwall	−11	1 stroke	(New Zealand) Lydia Ko		Oatlands
2010	ALPG	(Australia) Sarah Oh (2)	−9	1 stroke	(Australia) Katherine Hull		Oatlands
LG Bing Lee Women's NSW Open
2009	ALPG	(Australia) Sarah Oh	−15	3 strokes	(Australia) Katherine Hull		Oatlands
2008	ALPG	(England) Laura Davies	−9	2 strokes	(Australia) Sarah Oh		Oatlands
2007: No tournament
2006	ALPG	(Australia) Joanne Mills	−10	Playoff	(Australia) Sarah Kemp		Oatlands

== See also ==
- New South Wales Open
