= Julia Engström =

Swedish professional golfer (born 2001)

Personal information
- Full name: Julia Anna Margareta Engström
- Nationality: Sweden
- Born: 27 March 2001 (age 25) Bjärred, Sweden

Career
- Sport: Golf
- College: Stockholm University
- Turned professional: 2018
- Current tour: Ladies European Tour
- Former tour: LET Access Series
- Professional wins: 4

Number of wins by tour
- Ladies European Tour: 2
- WPGA Tour of Australasia: 1
- Other: 2

Best results in LPGA major championships
- Chevron Championship: DNP
- Women's PGA C'ship: CUT: 2020
- U.S. Women's Open: CUT: 2016
- Women's British Open: CUT: 2016, 2018, 2020
- Evian Championship: CUT: 2016

Achievements and awards
- LET Rookie of the Year: 2018
Medal record
European Golf Team Championships
Bronze medal – third place	2018 Gleneagles	Mixed team

Julia Anna Margareta Engström (born 27 March 2001) is a Swedish professional golfer. A golf prodigy, she became the youngest winner of the British Ladies Amateur, at age 15. She won twice on the Ladies European Tour as a teenager, and was the 2018 LET Rookie of the Year. At 21, she retired due to spinal injuries.

== Amateur career ==
Engström was introduced to golf by her parents aged two, and she had her first golf set at age four. Watching the 2007 Solheim Cup take place in her home town of Halmstad at age six inspired her, and by the age of thirteen she was a scratch player.

In 2014, at age 13, Engström made her debut appearance on the Ladies European Tour after receiving an invitation to play in the Helsingborg Open at Vasatorp Golf Club. Linda Wessberg, member of the 2007 Solheim Cup European team, was at the time out of action with a broken arm, and acted as her mentor.

In 2016, at age 15, Engström became the youngest player to win the British Ladies Amateur Golf Championship, earning her starts at the 2016 U.S. Women's Open, the 2016 Women's British Open, and the 2016 Evian Championship.

== Professional career ==
=== LET Success ===
In December 2017, aged 16, Engström qualified for the 2018 Ladies European Tour. She finished 17th on the Order of Merit and won the 2018 LET Rookie of the Year award. She won her first event as a professional at the 2018 Ladies Finnish Open, and followed it up with winning the 2018 LET Access Series season finale at El Prat, Spain.

Engström ended the 2019 season strongly, finishing top five in three of the last five tournaments. At the Magical Kenya Ladies Open in December she held a seven stroke lead going into the final round, but finished third after a final round of 74. She soon made a redemption for her loss however, as she overcame a five-shot deficit coming into the final round at the Women's NSW Open in March 2020 to clinch her maiden LET victory by two strokes. With the victory Engström moved to the top of the Race to Costa Del Sol leaderboard.

Engström secured her second LET victory of 2020 at the Lacoste Ladies Open de France, after carding a hole-in-one en route to a second round 64 (−7). With the win she moved to the top of the LET 2021 Solheim Cup Points leaderboard, just ahead of Christine Wolf and Emily Kristine Pedersen. With her two victories, Engström finished second in the 2020 LET Order of Merit, behind Pedersen.

=== Injury ===
Engström then suffered a spinal disc herniation and was sidelined for the entire 2021 season due to her injury. Attempting a comeback in 2022, she finished tied 11th at the Amundi German Masters, before succumbing to her ongoing injury. In early 2023, at age 21, she announced an indefinite timeout from golf, and a plan to attend law school at Stockholm University.

== Amateur wins ==
- 2013 Skandia Cup Riksfinal F13
- 2014 Finnish International Junior Championship F14, Skandia Cup Riksfinal F14, Skandia Tour Elit Girls #3,
- 2016 British Ladies Amateur

== Professional wins (4) ==
=== Ladies European Tour wins (2) ===
No.	Date	Tournament	Winning score	To par	Margin of victory	Runner(s)-up
1	1 Mar 2020	Women's NSW Open^	69-69-68-68=274	−14	2 strokes	(Belgium) Manon De Roey
2	19 Sep 2020	Lacoste Ladies Open de France	70-64-72=206	−7	1 stroke	(France) Céline Herbin (Argentina) Magdalena Simmermacher

^Co-sanctioned with the ALPG Tour

=== LET Access Series wins (2) ===
No.	Date	Tournament	Winning score	To par	Margin of victory	Runner(s)-up
1	9 Jun 2018	Viaplay Ladies Finnish Open	71-72-71=214	−2	Playoff	(Malaysia) Ainil Johani Bakar (Sweden) Emma Nilsson (Finland) Sanna Nuutinen (Finland) Ursula Wikström
2	10 Nov 2018	Santander Golf Tour LETAS El Prat	76-71-66=213	−3	1 stroke	(Spain) Mireia Prat

== Results in LPGA majors ==
Results not in chronological order before 2018.

Tournament	2016	2017	2018	2019	2020
ANA Inspiration					
U.S. Women's Open	CUT				
Women's PGA Championship					CUT
Women's British Open	CUT		CUT		CUT
The Evian Championship	CUT				NT

DNP = did not play
CUT = missed the half-way cut

== Team appearances ==
Amateur

- Junior Vagliano Trophy: (representing the Continent of Europe): 2015 (winners)
- Junior Ryder Cup (representing Europe): 2016
- Junior Solheim Cup (representing Europe): 2017
- Vagliano Trophy (representing the Continent of Europe): 2017 (winners)
- European Girls' Team Championship (representing Sweden): 2017 (winners)

Professional

- European Championships (representing Sweden): 2018
