= 2018 European Golf Team Championships =

Tournament information
- Dates: 8–12 August 2018
- Location: Auchterarder, Scotland, U.K. 56.2834°N 3.7522°W
- Course: PGA Centenary Course, Gleneagles
- Tours: European Tour; Ladies European Tour
- Format: Men's/women's team – match play Mixed team – 18-hole stroke play

Statistics
- Par: 72
- Field: 68 players from 15 nations 16 two-player teams – men's 16 two-player teams – women's 11 four-player teams – mixed
- Prize fund: €500,000 – Men's team €500,000 – Women's team €95,000 – Mixed team

Location map
- Location in the United Kingdom Location in Scotland

The 2018 European Golf Team Championships was a golf tournament played in August 2018 at Gleneagles, Scotland. It was the inaugural event and consisted of three competitions – men's, women's and mixed team format. 16 two-player teams took part in both men's and women's competitions.

The event was part of the 2018 European Championships, the inaugural edition of the European Championships, a multi-sport event which took place in Berlin, Germany, and Glasgow, Scotland from 2 to 12 August 2018.

Iceland topped the medal table, with a surprise win in the mixed team event the highlight of a campaign that returned two medals. Hosts Great Britain and Sweden both returned two medals, the latter including the gold in the women's team event, while Spain triumphed in the men's team.

The format failed to attract the highest ranked players, with Great Britain's Georgia Hall, ranked 10th in the world, the only player from the top 200 in the World of either sex to participate. No further championships were arranged after the inaugural event, and golf did not reappear in the list of European Championships events in 2022.

== Format ==
The European Golf Team Championships took place at Gleneagles in Scotland from 8−12 August 2018, featuring a 50/50 gender split in the field with male and female professionals competing for equal prize money in a men's team match play championship, a women's team match play championship, and a mixed team 18-hole foursomes stroke play championship.

The field consisted of 16 teams of two players competing in the men's and women's team events, before combining to form teams of four (two men and two women) in the mixed team championship.

The men's and women's team championships featured a round-robin group fourball format, on 8–10 August, with winners of each of the four groups progressing to the semi-finals where foursomes will determine the winners, on 12 August. In the group stage, two points were awarded for a win, one point for a halved match, and no points for a loss. Ties between two teams in the standings were determined by their head-to-head result and if teams were still tied for first place then a sudden-death playoff would occur.

The mixed team championship comprised teams of four (2 men and 2 women) playing in 18-hole mixed foursomes stroke play on 11 August, with combined scores used for team's total score. Ties for medal positions were determined by a sudden-death playoff involving the low-scoring foursome from each team involved.

== Qualification ==
Qualification for the Championships was via the European Golf Team Championships points tables for men and women, which were based on men's Official World Golf Ranking points and women's Women's World Golf Rankings points earned from tournaments finishing between 10 July 2017 and 9 July 2018 with a maximum of three teams representing any one nation in each event.

== Competitors ==
The following competitors were announced for the championships. Rank is the Official World Golf Ranking (men) or Women's World Golf Rankings (women) in the week prior to the championship.

=== Men ===
| Seed | Country | Players (rank) |
|---|---|---|
| 1 | Great Britain 1 | Callum Shinkwin (230) & Lee Slattery (233) |
| 2 | Italy 1 | Lorenzo Gagli (275) & Guido Migliozzi (593) |
| 3 | Spain 1 | Pedro Oriol (355) & Scott Fernández (476) |
| 4 | Great Britain 2 | Rhys Enoch (396) & Charlie Ford (509) |
| 5 | Great Britain 3 | Connor Syme (322) & Liam Johnston (381) |
| 6 | Portugal | José-Filipe Lima (341) & Ricardo Santos (738) |
| 7 | Norway | Jarand Ekeland Arnøy (668) & Kristian Krogh Johannessen (493) |
| 8 | Spain 2 | Santiago Tarrío (391) & David Borda (649) |
| 9 | Sweden 1 | Per Längfors (468) & Johan Edfors (759) |
| 10 | Iceland | Birgir Hafþórsson (586) & Axel Bóasson (663) |
| 11 | Poland | Adrian Meronk (588) & Mateusz Gradecki (947) |
| 12 | Italy 2 | Francesco Laporta (566) & Alessandro Tadini (858) |
| 13 | Ireland | Michael Hoey (536) & Neil O'Briain (983) |
| 14 | Denmark | Martin Ovesen (828) & Niklas Nørgaard (1040) |
| 15 | Belgium | Christopher Mivis (537) & Lars Buijs (1782) |
| 16 | Sweden 2 | Daniel Jennevret (843) & Oscar Florén (1749) |

=== Women ===
| Seed | Country | Players (rank) |
|---|---|---|
| 1 | Great Britain 1 | Georgia Hall (10) & Laura Davies (201) |
| 2 | Great Britain 2 | Catriona Matthew (211) & Holly Clyburn (250) |
| 3 | Iceland | Ólafía Þórunn Kristinsdóttir (269) & Valdís Þóra Jónsdóttir (357) |
| 4 | France 1 | Céline Herbin (242) & Astrid Vayson de Pradei (334) |
| 5 | Germany 1 | Olivia Cowan (247) & Karolin Lampert (252) |
| 6 | Great Britain 3 | Meghan MacLaren (273) & Michele Thomson (310) |
| 7 | Sweden 1 | Emma Nilsson (322) & Lina Boqvist (419) |
| 8 | Spain | Noemí Jiménez Martín (350) & Silvia Banon (422) |
| 9 | Germany 2 | Isi Gabsa (349) & Leticia Ras-Anderica (410) |
| 10 | Norway | Marianne Skarpnord (345) & Marita Engzelius (389) |
| 11 | Finland | Ursula Wikström (308) & Noora Komulainen (447) |
| 12 | France 2 | Justine Dreher (479) & Manon Mollé (396) |
| 13 | Sweden 2 | Johanna Gustavsson (441) & Julia Engström (455) |
| 14 | Austria | Christine Wolf (398) & Sarah Schober (494) |
| 15 | Sweden 3 | Cajsa Persson (469) & Linda Wessberg (437) |
| 16 | Belgium | Chloe Leurquin (554) & Manon De Roey (663) |

=== Mixed team ===
| Seed | Country | Foursome 1 | Foursome 2 |
|---|---|---|---|
| 1 | Great Britain 1 | Callum Shinkwin & Laura Davies | Lee Slattery & Georgia Hall |
| 2 | Great Britain 2 | Rhys Enoch & Holly Clyburn | Charlie Ford & Catriona Matthew |
| 3 | Great Britain 3 | Connor Syme & Michele Thomson | Liam Johnston & Meghan MacLaren |
| 4 | Spain | Pedro Oriol & Silvia Banon | Scott Fernández & Noemí Jiménez Martín |
| 5 | Norway | Jarand Ekeland Arnøy & Marita Engzelius | Kristian Krogh Johannessen & Marianne Skarpnord |
| 6 | Sweden 1 | Per Längfors & Lina Boqvist | Johan Edfors & Emma Nilsson |
| 7 | Sweden 2 | Daniel Jennevret & Julia Engström | Oscar Florén & Johanna Gustavsson |
| 8 | Iceland | Birgir Hafþórsson & Valdis Thora Jonsdottir | Axel Bóasson & Ólafía Þórunn Kristinsdóttir |
| 9 | Belgium | Christopher Mivis & Manon De Roey | Lars Buijs & Chloe Leurquin |
| – | Italy | Lorenzo Gagli & Stefania Avanzo (782) | Guido Migliozzi & Diana Luna (649) |
| – | Austria | Clemens Gaster (1230) & Sarah Schober | Bernard Neumayer (1332) & Christine Wolf |

== Results ==
=== Men's team ===
==== Pool play ====
Teams were divided into 4 groups of 4 teams and played round-robin matches Wednesday to Friday using the fourball format.

- Round 1 – 8 August
- Round 2 – 9 August
- Round 3 – 10 August

Group A
| Round | Winner | Score | Loser |
|---|---|---|---|
| 1 | Great Britain 1 | halved | Spain 2 |
| 1 | Sweden 2 | 1 up | Sweden 1 |
| 2 | Great Britain 1 | 6 & 5 | Sweden 1 |
| 2 | Spain 2 | 1 up | Sweden 2 |
| 3 | Sweden 2 | 3 & 2 | Great Britain 1 |
| 3 | Spain 2 | 3 & 2 | Sweden 1 |

| Seed | Player | W | L | H | Points | Finish |
|---|---|---|---|---|---|---|
| 8 | Spain 2 | 2 | 0 | 1 | 5 | 1 |
| 16 | Sweden 2 | 2 | 1 | 0 | 4 | 2 |
| 1 | Great Britain 1 | 1 | 1 | 1 | 3 | 3 |
| 9 | Sweden 1 | 0 | 3 | 0 | 0 | 4 |

Group B
| Round | Winner | Score | Loser |
|---|---|---|---|
| 1 | Great Britain 3 | 4 & 3 | Great Britain 2 |
| 1 | Italy 2 | 2 & 1 | Ireland |
| 2 | Italy 2 | 2 & 1 | Great Britain 2 |
| 2 | Great Britain 3 | 2 & 1 | Ireland |
| 3 | Ireland | 4 & 3 | Great Britain 2 |
| 3 | Italy 2 | 1 up | Great Britain 3 |

| Seed | Player | W | L | H | Points | Finish |
|---|---|---|---|---|---|---|
| 12 | Italy 2 | 3 | 0 | 0 | 6 | 1 |
| 5 | Great Britain 3 | 2 | 1 | 0 | 4 | 2 |
| 13 | Ireland | 1 | 2 | 0 | 2 | 3 |
| 4 | Great Britain 2 | 0 | 3 | 0 | 0 | 4 |

Group C
| Round | Winner | Score | Loser |
|---|---|---|---|
| 1 | Spain 1 | 2 & 1 | Portugal |
| 1 | Poland | 1 up | Denmark |
| 2 | Spain 1 | 2 & 1 | Poland |
| 2 | Portugal | 2 & 1 | Denmark |
| 3 | Denmark | 4 & 3 | Spain 1 |
| 3 | Portugal | 5 & 3 | Poland |

| Seed | Player | W | L | H | Points | Finish |
|---|---|---|---|---|---|---|
| 3 | Spain 1 | 2 | 1 | 0 | 4 | 1 |
| 6 | Portugal | 2 | 1 | 0 | 4 | 2 |
| 11 | Poland | 1 | 2 | 0 | 2 | 3 |
| 14 | Denmark | 1 | 2 | 0 | 2 | 4 |

Group D
| Round | Winner | Score | Loser |
|---|---|---|---|
| 1 | Norway | 4 & 3 | Italy 1 |
| 1 | Iceland | 6 & 5 | Belgium |
| 2 | Iceland | 2 & 1 | Italy 1 |
| 2 | Norway | 1 up | Belgium |
| 3 | Italy 1 | 4 & 3 | Belgium |
| 3 | Iceland | 2 up | Norway |

| Seed | Player | W | L | H | Points | Finish |
|---|---|---|---|---|---|---|
| 10 | Iceland | 3 | 0 | 0 | 6 | 1 |
| 7 | Norway | 2 | 0 | 0 | 4 | 2 |
| 2 | Italy 1 | 1 | 2 | 0 | 2 | 3 |
| 15 | Belgium | 0 | 3 | 0 | 0 | 4 |

==== Medal bracket ====
Sunday, 12 August

Semifinals
8 | Spain 2
10 | Iceland | 2 & 1
12 | Italy 2
3 | Spain 1 | 2 up

Gold medal match
10 | Iceland
3 | Spain 1 | 2 up
Bronze medal match
8 | Spain 2
12 | Italy 2 | 5 & 3

=== Women's team ===
==== Pool play ====
Teams were divided into 4 groups of 4 teams and played round-robin matches Wednesday to Friday using the fourball format.

- Round 1 – 8 August
- Round 2 – 9 August
- Round 3 – 10 August

Group A
| Round | Winner | Score | Loser |
|---|---|---|---|
| 1 | Great Britain 1 | 5 & 4 | Spain |
| 1 | Germany 2 | 5 & 3 | Belgium |
| 2 | Great Britain 1 | 4 & 3 | Germany 2 |
| 2 | Spain | halved | Belgium |
| 3 | Great Britain 1 | 4 & 2 | Belgium |
| 3 | Germany 2 | 2 up | Spain |

| Seed | Player | W | L | H | Points | Finish |
|---|---|---|---|---|---|---|
| 1 | Great Britain 1 | 3 | 0 | 0 | 6 | 1 |
| 9 | Germany 2 | 2 | 1 | 0 | 4 | 2 |
| 8 | Spain | 0 | 2 | 1 | 1 | T3 |
| 16 | Belgium | 0 | 2 | 1 | 1 | T3 |

Group B
| Round | Winner | Score | Loser |
|---|---|---|---|
| 1 | France 1 | 4 & 3 | Germany 1 |
| 1 | France 2 | 2 & 1 | Sweden 2 |
| 2 | France 1 | halved | France 2 |
| 2 | Sweden 2 | 3 & 2 | Germany 1 |
| 3 | Sweden 2 | 4 & 3 | France 1 |
| 3 | France 2 | 1 up | Germany 1 |

| Seed | Player | W | L | H | Points | Finish |
|---|---|---|---|---|---|---|
| 12 | France 2 | 2 | 0 | 1 | 5 | 1 |
| 13 | Sweden 2 | 2 | 1 | 0 | 4 | 2 |
| 4 | France 1 | 1 | 1 | 1 | 3 | 3 |
| 5 | Germany 1 | 0 | 3 | 0 | 0 | 4 |

Group C
| Round | Winner | Score | Loser |
|---|---|---|---|
| 1 | Great Britain 3 | 5 & 4 | Iceland |
| 1 | Finland | 3 & 2 | Austria |
| 2 | Iceland | halved | Finland |
| 2 | Great Britain 3 | 5 & 3 | Austria |
| 3 | Iceland | halved | Austria |
| 3 | Great Britain 3 | halved | Finland |

| Seed | Player | W | L | H | Points | Finish |
|---|---|---|---|---|---|---|
| 6 | Great Britain 3 | 2 | 0 | 1 | 5 | 1 |
| 11 | Finland | 1 | 0 | 2 | 4 | 2 |
| 3 | Iceland | 0 | 1 | 2 | 2 | 3 |
| 14 | Austria | 0 | 2 | 1 | 1 | 4 |

Group D
| Round | Winner | Score | Loser |
|---|---|---|---|
| 1 | Great Britain 2 | 3 & 2 | Sweden 1 |
| 1 | Sweden 3 | 5 & 4 | Norway |
| 2 | Great Britain 2 | 1 up | Norway |
| 2 | Sweden 1 | 5 & 4 | Sweden 3 |
| 3 | Sweden 3 | 2 up | Great Britain 2 |
| 3 | Norway | 2 & 1 | Sweden 1 |

| Seed | Player | W | L | H | Points | Finish |
|---|---|---|---|---|---|---|
| 15 | Sweden 3 | 2 | 1 | 0 | 4 | 1 |
| 2 | Great Britain 2 | 2 | 1 | 0 | 4 | 2 |
| 10 | Norway | 1 | 2 | 0 | 2 | 3 |
| 7 | Sweden 1 | 1 | 2 | 0 | 2 | 4 |

==== Medal bracket ====
Sunday, 12 August

Semifinals
1 | Great Britain 1
15 | Sweden 3 | 1 up
12 | France 2 | 5 & 4
6 | Great Britain 3

Gold medal match
15 | Sweden 3 | 20 holes
12 | France 2
Bronze medal match
1 | Great Britain 1
6 | Great Britain 3 | 3 & 1

=== Mixed team ===
The mixed team championship comprised eleven teams of four (2 men and 2 women) playing in 18-hole mixed foursomes stroke play on 11 August, with combined scores used for team's total score. Ties for medal positions were determined by a sudden-death playoff involving the low-scoring foursome from each team involved.

| Place | Nation | Score | To par |
|---|---|---|---|
| 1st place, gold medalist(s) | Iceland | 70-71=141 | −3 |
| 2nd place, silver medalist(s) | Great Britain 3 | 72-70=142 | −2 |
| 3rd place, bronze medalist(s) | Sweden 2 | 70-73=143 | −1 |
| 4 | Spain | 75-68=143 | −1 |
| T5 | Great Britain 1 | 76-69=145 | +1 |
| T5 | Sweden 1 | 72-73=145 | +1 |
| 7 | Austria | 75-72=147 | +3 |
| 8 | Belgium | 77-71=148 | +4 |
| T9 | Great Britain 2 | 76-73=149 | +5 |
| T9 | Norway | 73-76=149 | +5 |
| 11 | Italy | 76-74=150 | +6 |

Sweden 2 defeated Spain with a birdie at the first hole of the bronze medal playoff.

== Medalists ==
| Event | Gold | Silver | Bronze |
|---|---|---|---|
| Men's team | Spain 1 Pedro Oriol; Scott Fernández | (Iceland) Iceland; Birgir Hafþórsson; Axel Bóasson | Italy 2 Francesco Laporta; Alessandro Tadini |
| Women's team | Sweden 3 Cajsa Persson; Linda Wessberg | France 2 Justine Dreher; Manon Mollé | (United Kingdom) Great Britain 3 Meghan MacLaren; Michele Thomson |
| Mixed team | (Iceland) Iceland; Ólafía Þórunn Kristinsdóttir; Birgir Hafþórsson; Valdis Thora Jonsdottir; Axel Bóasson | (United Kingdom) Great Britain 3 Meghan MacLaren; Liam Johnston; Michele Thomson; Connor Syme | Sweden 2 Daniel Jennevret; Oscar Florén; Johanna Gustavsson; Julia Engström |

== Medal summary ==
* Host nation (Great Britain)

| Rank | Nation | Gold | Silver | Bronze | Total |
|---|---|---|---|---|---|
| 1 | Iceland (ISL) | 1 | 1 | 0 | 2 |
| 2 | Sweden (SWE) | 1 | 0 | 1 | 2 |
| 3 | Spain (ESP) | 1 | 0 | 0 | 1 |
| 4 | Great Britain (GBR)* | 0 | 1 | 1 | 2 |
| 5 | France (FRA) | 0 | 1 | 0 | 1 |
| 6 | Italy (ITA) | 0 | 0 | 1 | 1 |
| Totals (6 entries) | | 3 | 3 | 3 | 9 |
