= Gleneagles Hotel =

Hotel near Auchterarder, Perth and Kinross, Scotland

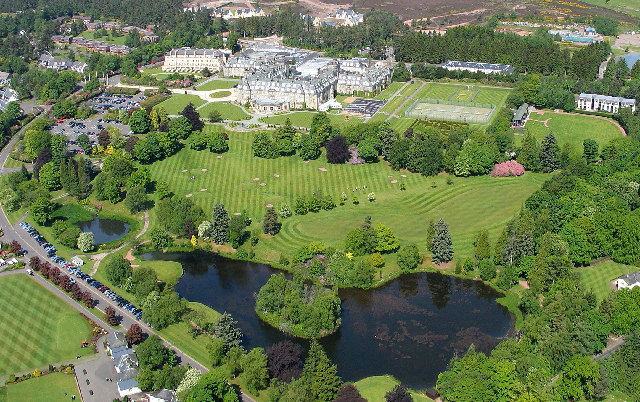
- Gleneagles Hotel and grounds

General information
- Status: Completed
- Type: Hotel
- Architectural style: Georgian
- Location: Auchterarder; Perthshire; PH3 1NF, Scotland
- Coordinates: 56°17′09″N 3°44′51″W
- Construction started: 1913 (paused 1914 – 1922)
- Completed: 1924
- Opened: 7 June 1924; 102 years ago
- Owner: Ennismore

Technical details
- Floor count: 3-storey with attics

Design and construction
- Architect: Matthew Adam
- Architecture firm: Caledonian Railway Divisional Engineer
- Developer: Caledonian Railway
- Other designers: Charles W. Swanson (interior designer)

Other information
- Number of rooms: 232
- Number of restaurants: 6 (The Strathearn; Andrew Fairlie; The Birnam; The Dormy; Glendevon; Garden Cafe)
- Number of bars: 4 (Auchterader 70; The Century Bar; The American Bar; Inglenook)
- Public transit: Gleneagles

Website
- gleneagles.com

Listed Building – Category B
- Official name: Gleneagles Hotel
- Designated: 8 April 1980
- Reference no.: LB4570

Inventory of Gardens and Designed Landscapes in Scotland
- Official name: Gleneagles Hotel and Golf Courses
- Designated: 1 July 1987
- Reference no.: GDL00360

Gleneagles Hotel
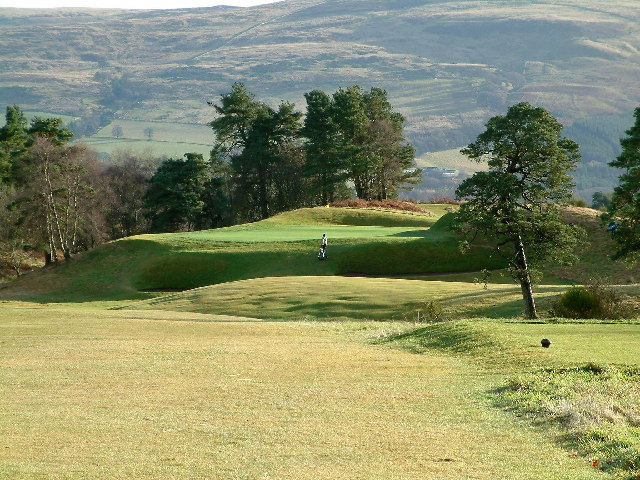
- The 9th hole on Kings Course at Gleneagles
- Interactive map of Gleneagles Hotel

Club information
- Location: Auchterarder, Scotland, UK
- Established: 1924
- Type: Private
- Owner: Ennismore
- Total holes: 63
- Tournaments: Ryder Cup, Johnnie Walker Championship
- Website: www.gleneagles.com

King's Course
- Designed by: James Braid
- Par: 71
- Length: 6,790 yards

Queen's Course
- Designed by: James Braid
- Par: 68
- Length: 5,965 yards

PGA Centenary Course
- Designed by: Jack Nicklaus
- Par: 73
- Length: 7,320 yards

Wee Course (9 holes)
- Designed by: George Alexander
- Par: 27
- Length: 1481 yards

Gleneagles Hotel is a hotel near Auchterarder, Scotland. It was commissioned by the Caledonian Railway and opened in 1924. The bandleader Henry Hall performed at the hotel before the Second World War during which it served as a military hospital. There are three tournament-standard golf courses in the grounds and the hotel was redeveloped for the 40th Ryder Cup in 2014. Significant conferences at the hotel have included the Commonwealth Heads of Government Meeting 1977 and the 31st G8 summit in July 2005. It is a Category B listed building.

== History ==
Construction of the hotel was commenced by the Caledonian Railway (CR), which also built the nearby Gleneagles railway station. However, by the time it opened in 1924, the CR had been absorbed by the London, Midland and Scottish Railway (LMS). It was equipped with its own dedicated railway branch line. An up-and-coming dance band leader named Henry Hall was involved in buying their pianos, and organising the dance band entertainment. He decided that radio broadcasts would be an ideal way to advertise the new hotel, so was given permission to move his Trafford Band from Manchester's Midland Hotel to the Gleneagles and form a new band in Manchester. The hotel's opening night was celebrated with Scotland's first ever outside broadcast on 7 June 1924.

After the season ended, the band moved to the Adelphi Hotel in Liverpool. Summer 1925 saw the band return to Gleneagles, although their commercial recordings were made in Manchester, and the winter seasons were in Liverpool.

During World War II, as with many large country hotels, it was converted into Gleneagles Hospital under the charge of Dr Thomas Ferguson as Medical Superintendent. In 1948 ownership of the hotel passed from LMS to the British Transport Commission and in 1963 to British Transport Hotels.

In 1980 the hotel was designated as a Category B listed building. In 1981, British Transport Hotels sold Gleneagles to a newly established private sector operator, Gleneagles Hotels plc. In 1984 it was acquired by Arthur Bell & Sons, which came into the ownership of Guinness in 1985 and Diageo in 1997.

Between 1982 and 1986, £11 million was spent on renovation and since 1982 the hotel has been open all year round. In 1986, and every year since, the hotel has been awarded five red stars by the AA. The hotel remained owned by Diageo, until it was sold to a private investment company Ennismore in 2015.

In early 1994, English rock band Oasis performed at the Hotel during a showcase for executives of Sony Records. This performance and its soundcheck yielded recordings of the songs "Supersonic" and "I Am the Walrus" that were subsequently used as B-Sides for two of the groups CD singles.

The hotel was redeveloped in preparation for hosting the 40th Ryder Cup in 2014 played on the PGA Centenary Course.

== Facilities ==
Gleneagles has three golf courses: the King's Course, Queen's Course and PGA Centenary Course, previously known as the Monarch's Course. There is also a nine-hole course called the PGA National Academy Course, informally known as the Wee Course. Gleneagles Golf Academy opened in 1994 and in 2010 was re-branded to The PGA National Academy for Scotland. The Jack Nicklaus-designed PGA Centenary Course opened in 1993 and hosted the Ryder Cup in 2014. When asked about his work, Nicklaus said, "It's the finest parcel of land in the world I have ever been given to work with."

Tournaments that have taken place at Gleneagles include:

- Glasgow Herald Tournament from 1920 to 1927
- Curtis Cup in 1936
- Women's British Open in 1957
- Scottish Open from 1987 to 1994
- McDonald's WPGA Championship of Europe from 1996 to 1999
- Johnnie Walker Championship at Gleneagles from 1999 to 2013
- 40th Ryder Cup Matches in 2014
- European Golf Team Championships in 2018
- Solheim Cup and Junior Solheim Cup in 2019
- Senior Open Championship in 2022 and 2026

The British School of Falconry has been located at Gleneagles since 1992.

The village of Glenmor has holiday homes set within the grounds of the hotel.

== Conferences ==
Conferences have included:

- Gleneagles Agreement on sporting contacts with South Africa at the Commonwealth Heads of Government Meeting 1977.
- The 1986 meeting (25–27 April) of the Bilderberg Group.
- 31st G8 summit in July 2005. This meeting saw the foundation of the G8+5.

== Awards ==
Gleneagles Hotel has won/holds various awards, including:

- 5 Red AA Stars (since 1986)
- Conde Nast Gold List 2009 – Best Hotel in the World for Facilities
- Scotland's leading resort at the World Travel Awards 2008
- Best Golf Resort in the World (2012, 2013, 2014, 2015, 2016 and 2017) – Ultratravel Magazine
- Scotland's Best Hotel – Today's Golfer Travel Awards (2014, 2015, 2016 and 2017)

== See also ==
- Golf in Scotland
- Gleneagles, Scotland
- List of G8 summit resorts
- Emergency Hospital Service
