= Ólafía Þórunn Kristinsdóttir =

Icelandic professional golfer (born 1992)

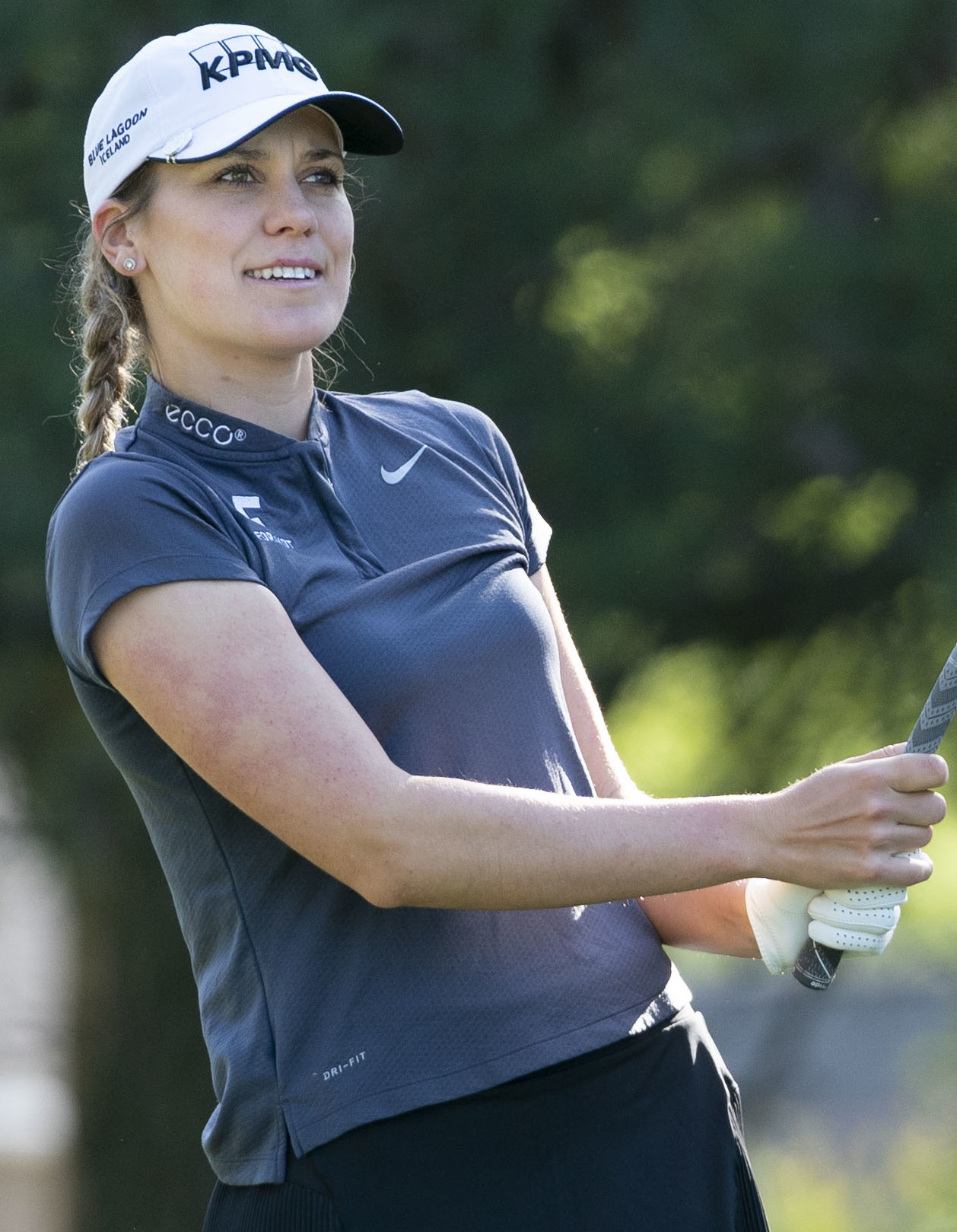
- Kristinsdóttir in 2019

Personal information
- Nationality: Iceland
- Born: 15 October 1992 (age 34) Reykjavík, Iceland
- Height: 5 ft 10 in (178 cm)

Career
- Sport: Golf
- College: Wake Forest University
- Turned professional: 2014
- Current tour: LPGA Tour (joined 2017)
- Former tour: Ladies European Tour

Best results in LPGA major championships
- Chevron Championship: CUT: 2018
- Women's PGA C'ship: CUT: 2017, 2018
- U.S. Women's Open: CUT: 2018, 2019
- Women's British Open: CUT: 2017
- Evian Championship: T48: 2017
Medal record
European Golf Team Championships
Gold medal – first place	2018 Gleneagles	Mixed team

Ólafía Þórunn Kristinsdóttir (born 15 October 1992) is an Icelandic former professional golfer. She was named the Icelandic Sportsperson of the Year in 2017. She was the first golfer from Iceland to participate in the LPGA Tour. In August 2022, she announced her retirement from professional golf.

== Results in LPGA majors ==
Results not in chronological order before 2019.

Tournament	2017	2018	2019
ANA Inspiration		CUT	
U.S. Women's Open		CUT	CUT
Women's PGA Championship	CUT	CUT	
The Evian Championship	T48		
Women's British Open	CUT		

Did not play

CUT = missed the half-way cut
T = tied

== Team appearances ==
Amateur

- European Ladies' Team Championship (representing Iceland): 2009, 2010, 2011, 2013, 2014
- Espirito Santo Trophy (representing Iceland): 2014

Professional

- European Championships (representing Iceland): 2018 (winner – mixed team)
