= Glen Eagles =

Place in Scotland

Coordinates: 56.2439°N 3.7094°W

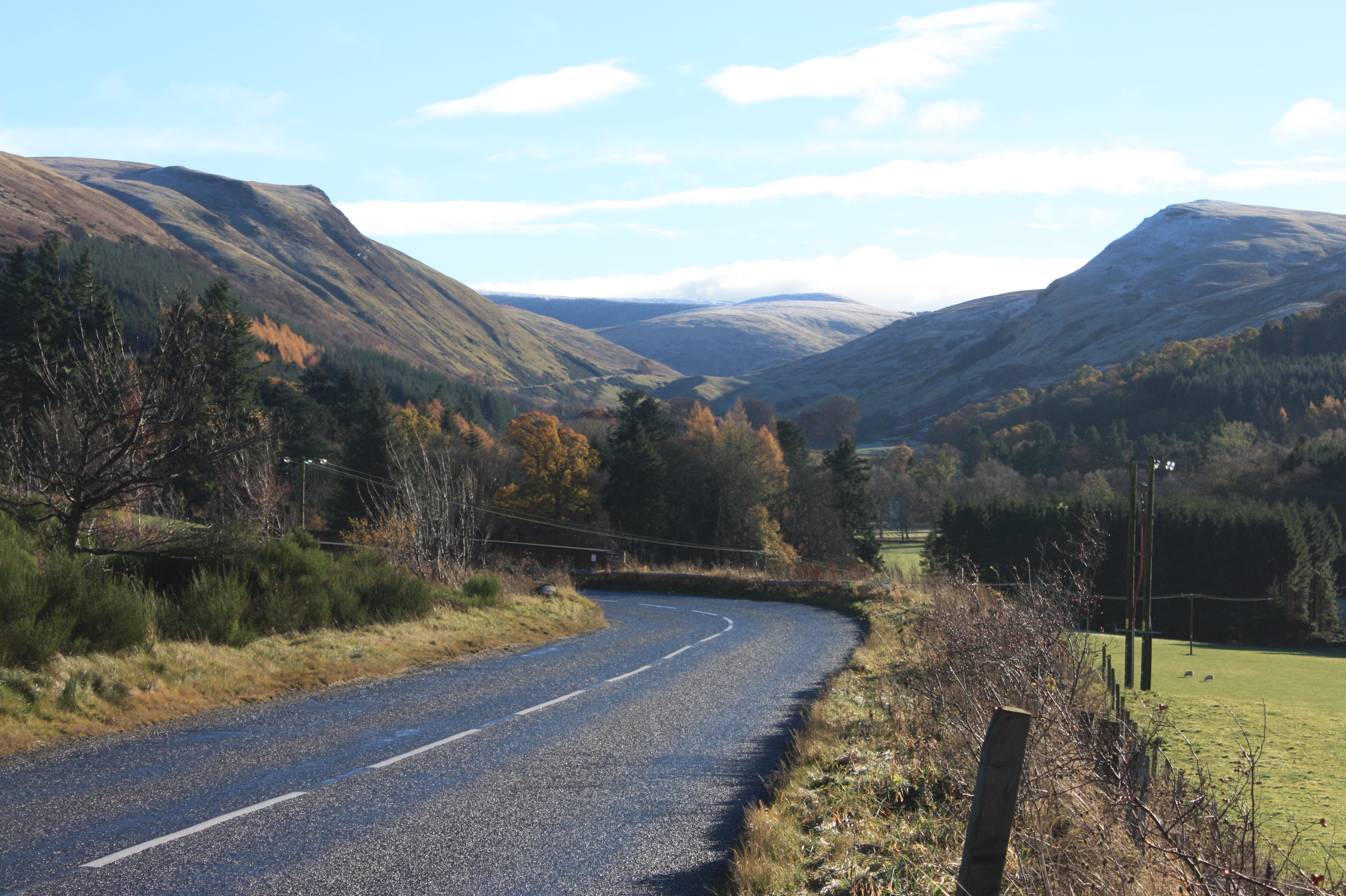
Glen Eagles as seen from the north

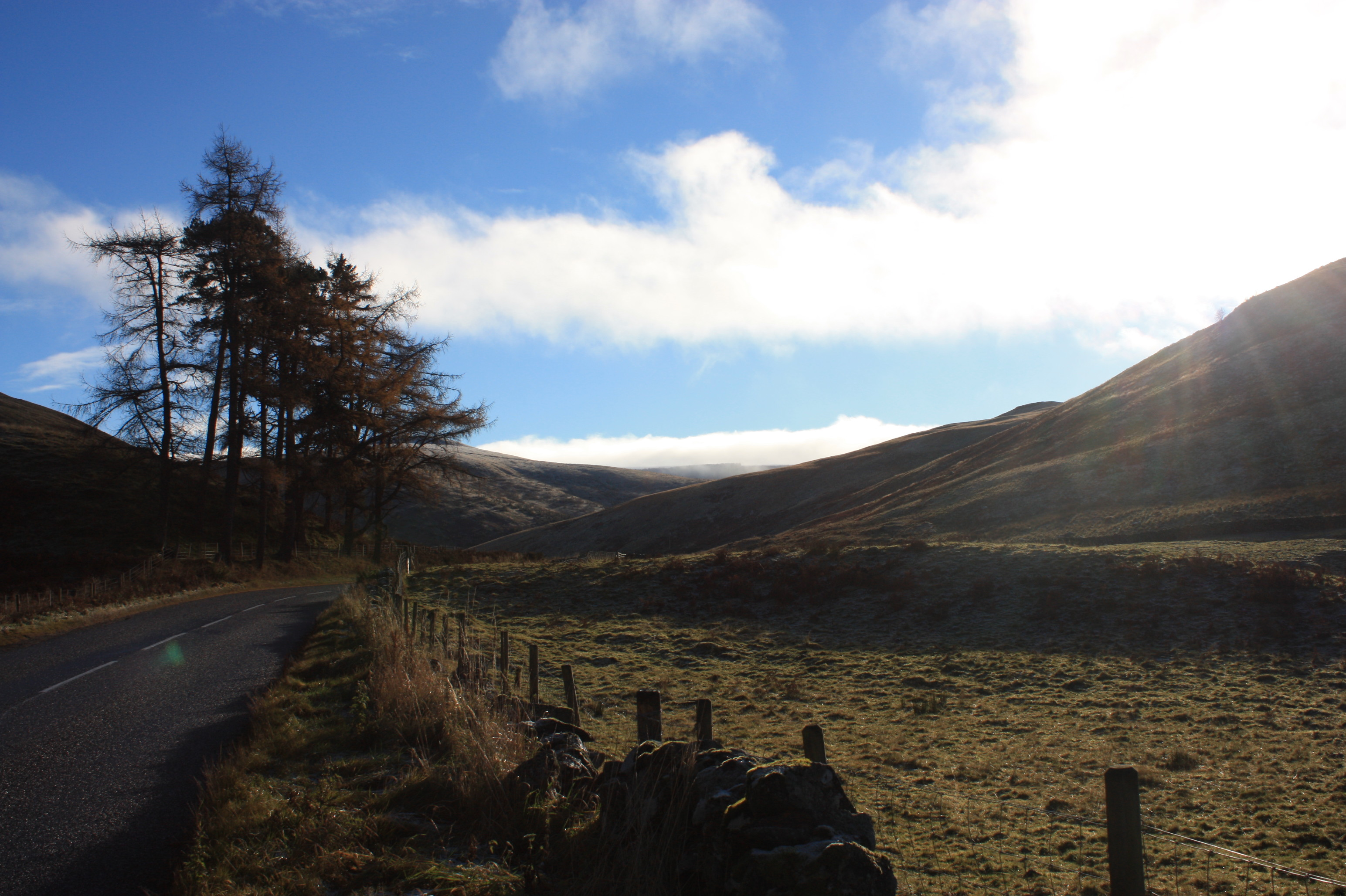
The upper pass of Glen Eagles linking to Glendevon

Glen Eagles (Scottish Gaelic: Gleann na h-Eaglais/Gleann Eagas) is a glen that connects with Glen Devon to form a pass through the Ochil Hills of Perth and Kinross in Scotland. (The spelling as two words, 'Glen Eagles', is as shown on UK Ordnance Survey maps.)

The name's origin has nothing to do with eagles, and is a corruption of eaglais or ecclesia, meaning church, and refers to the chapel and well of Saint Mungo, which was restored as a memorial to the Haldane family that owns the Gleneagles estate.

Gleneagles House at the northern entrance to Gleneagles comprises a 1750 extension to an earlier 17th-century building that is approached by an avenue of lime trees planted to commemorate the Battle of Camperdown. Little remains of Gleneagles Castle, the early 16th-century tower house of the Haldanes.

The Caledonian Railway used its name for the Gleneagles Hotel and golf course they built some distance from the glen at the edge of Auchterarder. The hotel hosted the 31st G8 summit conference in July 2005.

Gleneagles railway station, formerly known as Crieff Junction, is on the line between Perth and Stirling. As its name suggests, this was the junction for the Crieff Junction Railway, which closed in 1964.

== See also ==
- Gleneagles Agreement
- Gleneagles Hotel
