= European Championships (multi-sport event) =

Sports concept

- Jurisdiction: Europe
- Membership: 9 sports federations
- Founded: 2018

Official website
- www.europeanchampionships.com

The European Championships are a multi-sport tournament which brought together the existing European Championships of some of the continent's leading sports every four years. The inaugural edition in 2018 was staged by the host cities of Berlin, Germany and Glasgow, United Kingdom between 2 and 12 August. The second edition in 2022 took place in Munich, Germany.

The various Europe-wide championships in the same disciplines that were held outside this quadrennial framework (e.g. annually in the cases of cycling, gymnastics, rowing and triathlon; biennially in the cases of athletics and aquatics) were unaffected by this event.

In January 2025, the UEC confirmed that the combined event would not be happening in 2026, and the future of the event is uncertain. In December 2024, the organising company behind the venture was dissolved.

It was reported in August 2026 that Switzerland was considering bidding for a possible 2034 edition, having failed to secure funding commitments from the government for a 2030 championships.

== Overview ==
European Championships Management, co-founded by Paul Bristow and Marc Jörg, developed the event concept, and managed and implemented the European Championships on behalf of the participating Federations. The 2018 European Athletics Championships were held in Berlin, while Glasgow hosted the Aquatics, Cycling, Gymnastics, Rowing and Triathlon along with a new European Golf Team Championships. The championships were being staged under one new brand with the 'Mark of a Champion', a star-like logo.

The second edition saw aquatics and golf remove themselves from the programme, while canoe sprint and paracanoe, sports climbing, beach volleyball, table tennis and rowing joined the event.

At the end of the second edition, European Athletic Association indicated that athletics would leave the programme for 2026 and, as with aquatics in 2022, would hold its championships on the same dates but under its own branding.

The European Broadcasting Union was a key partner in the event, broadcasting across Europe's free to air channels via its Eurovision Network, with an estimated audience of 1.03 billion.

This competition was not related to the European Games organised by the European Olympic Committees in the 'Olympic tradition'.

== First edition (2018) ==
The European governing bodies for athletics, aquatics, cycling, golf, gymnastics, rowing and triathlon, co-ordinated their individual continental championships as part of the first edition between 2 and 12 August 2018, hosted by the cities of Berlin (already chosen as the host for the 2018 European Athletics Championships) and Glasgow (already chosen as the host for the 2018 European Aquatics Championships, and which also hosted the events of the other sports).

The initial participating continental governing bodies, and championships, were:

- European Athletics organising the 2018 European Athletics Championships in Berlin, Germany
- Ligue Européenne de Natation organising the 2018 European Aquatics Championships
- Union Européenne de Cyclisme organising the 2018 European Cycling Championships, bringing together the individual Track, Road, Mountain Biking and BMX championships of the continent
- FISA organising the 2018 European Rowing Championships
- European Triathlon Union organising the European Triathlon Championships
- European Union of Gymnastics organising the 2018 European Artistic Gymnastics Championships, all in Glasgow, Scotland
- European Tour and Ladies European Tour organising the inaugural European Golf Team Championships, in Gleneagles, Scotland

The European Broadcasting Union (EBU), the umbrella body for the continent's free-to-air channels, was the broadcast partner for the combined championships, which were expected to generate more than 2700 hours of programming. For athletics alone, there was a 20% rise in television viewing figures compared to a traditional single-sport European Athletics Championships.

All of Europe's major free-to-air broadcasters televised the European Championships in 2018, such as BBC in the United Kingdom, ARD/ZDF in Germany, France Televisions in France, RAI in Italy and TVE in Spain. Other EBU members who signed up include VRT (Belgium), HRT (Croatia), DR (Denmark), YLE (Finland), RTÉ (Ireland), NOS (Netherlands), NRK (Norway), TVP (Poland), SRG SSR (Switzerland) and SVT/TV4 (Sweden). The level of coverage was also enhanced by a deal with Eurosport. In total, over 40 EBU members signed agreements as of April 2018. There were discussions with broadcasters in the remaining territories in Europe, plus other global territories like China, Japan and USA.

Glasgow 2018 had official partners (People Make Glasgow, Scottish Government, Strathmore Water, Spar & Eurovision) and Berlin 2018 had six official partners (Spar, Le Gruyère, Nike, Toyo Tires, Generali & Eurovision) with another tier of official supporters across the two host cities. Overall over 56 companies signed up to support the inaugural event.

To be staged between 2 and 12 August 2018, around 1,500 athletes competed at the European Athletics Championships in Berlin, whilst at the same time more than 3,000 competed in the other championships in Glasgow. Each European Championship was organised by their respective federation and host city.

On 1 August, at the Opening Party in Glasgow, a new European Championship Trophy was unveiled, which was awarded to the nation achieving the most gold medals across all seven sports during the Championships. It was presented by Katherine Grainger, Emma Fredh and Angelina Melnikova on behalf of the seven European federations involved in the event.

== Second edition (2022) ==
The second edition of the European Championships took place in Munich, Germany, in the summer of 2022.

=== Bidding for 2022 ===
The first step in the bidding process for 2022 was the distribution of the official Bid Information Document to interested parties, with a preliminary questionnaire to be submitted. The participating European Sports Federations were expected to announce the 2022 hosts after the first edition in August 2018.

Possible bids included (as host dates had to be 11–21 August to avoid conflicting with the 2022 Commonwealth Games in Birmingham, England):

- Athens, Greece - subject to a joint bid with Elefsina
- Brussels, Antwerp, Hazewinkel in Belgium, and Eindhoven in the Netherlands, and Luxembourg to form a "Benelux" bid
- Hamburg, Germany (athletics in London, United Kingdom)
- London, United Kingdom (to avoid two short-gap European athletics championships in Germany if other sports were hosted there)
- Katowice, Poznań and Pruszków, Poland
- Rome, Italy (rowing and track cycling in Lombardy region)
- North Rhine-Westphalia, Germany (athletics in London, United Kingdom)
- Berlin, Germany (athletics in London, United Kingdom)
- Munich, Germany
- Gothenburg and Malmö, Sweden (track cycling and rowing in Copenhagen, Denmark)

In 2019, Munich was confirmed as the 2022 host.

=== Participants ===
The participating continental governing bodies, and championships, in the 2022 edition of the event, all in Munich, were:

- European Athletics organising the 2022 European Athletics Championships
- UEC organising the 2022 European Cycling Championships, bringing together the individual Track, Road, Mountain Biking and BMX championships of the continent
- FISA organising the 2022 European Rowing Championships
- ETU organising the 2022 European Triathlon Championships
- UEG organising the 2022 European Artistic Gymnastics Championships in Scotland
- CEV organising the 2022 European Beach Volleyball Championship ◎
- ICF organising the 2022 European Canoe Sprint Championships, incorporating the 2022 European Paracanoe Sprint Championships, the first para events to be included in the Championships ◎
- IFSC organising the 2022 IFSC Climbing European Championships ◎
- ETTU, organising the 2022 European Table Tennis Championships ◎

◎ : inaugural appearance of the sport at the European Championships.

European Tour golf organisation, which discontinued the European Team Golf Championships, and LEN/European Aquatics League, which were holding their 2022 European Aquatics Championships simultaneously but separately in Rome, did not return from 2018.

== Subsequent editions (2026–) ==
In November 2023, the European federations of seven core sports (Confédération Européenne de Volleyball, European Canoe Association, Union Européenne de Cyclisme, European Rowing, International Federation of Sport Climbing, European Table Tennis Union, and Europe Triathlon) announced their commitment to the European Championships event going forward to 2034, confirming the 2026 event. The major other federations - European Athletics, European Aquatics, European Union of Gymnastics and golf's European Tour - have not so committed, with the 2026 European Athletics Championships already awarded alone to Birmingham, and the 2026 European Aquatics Championships awarded to Paris.

Following rumours of difficulty in securing a venue, in January 2025 UEC confirmed that the 2026 event had been cancelled, with each sport moving forward with its own events. The UEC further noted the future of the event was uncertain and that the cancellation was 'definitive'.

Since 2025 Switzerland is considering a bidding for the 2030 or 2034 edition.

== History ==
European Athletics, European Aquatics, Union Européenne de Cyclisme, World Rowing and Europe Triathlon agreed in 2015 to organise their individual championships as part of the European Championships. The individual federations and the host cities began to organise the individual championships with a co-ordinated timetable and a unifying common brand. The championships included the European Athletics Championships, the European Aquatics Championships, the European Road Cycling Championships, the European Track Championships, the European Rowing Championships, and the Europe Triathlon Championships as well as the European Gymnastics Championships and the new European Golf Team Championships. Both gymnastics and golf formally joined the new event during that year.

In the lead up to the announcement of the programme for the second edition of the combined European Championships, both the PGA European Tour and European Aquatics revealed that their respective sports would not be part of the event; the European Team Golf Championship was suspended after one edition, while the 2022 European Aquatics Championships was moved to Rome, Italy. Nine sports were confirmed for 2022 edition: athletics, cycling, gymnastics, rowing, and triathlon returned, while the four new sports of beach volleyball, canoe sprint, sport climbing and table tennis were added. The European Aquatics Championships were held over the same dates as the combined championships.

== Host cities ==
Year	Host city/s	Host nation/s	Dates	Sports/Disciplines	Events	Nations	Athletes	Venues
2018	Berlin	Germany	2–12 August	Athletics	50	49	1500	Berlin Olympic Stadium; Breitscheidplatz
2018	Glasgow	United Kingdom	2–12 August	Aquatics; Swimming; Diving; Synchronized swimming; Open water swimming	72	48	1072	Tollcross International Swimming Centre; Royal Commonwealth Pool; Scotstoun Sports Campus; Loch Lomond
2018	Glasgow	United Kingdom	2–12 August	Cycling; Track; Road; Mountain bike; BMX	30		1055	Emirates Arena; Cathkin Braes MTB Track; Glasgow BMX Track
2018	Glasgow	United Kingdom	2–12 August	Golf	3	15	68	Gleneagles PGA Centenary Course
2018	Glasgow	United Kingdom	2–12 August	Gymnastics; Artistic gymnastics	12		311	SSE Hydro
2018	Glasgow	United Kingdom	2–12 August	Rowing	17	32	600	Strathclyde Country Park
2018	Glasgow	United Kingdom	2–12 August	Triathlon	3		180	Strathclyde Country Park
2022	Munich	Germany	11–21 August	Athletics	50	50	1500	Olympiapark (Munich); Olympic Stadium Munich; Munich City Centre
2022	Munich	Germany	11–21 August	Cycling; Track cycling; Road cycling; Mountain bike; BMX freestyle	30	40	770	Olympiapark (Munich); Messe München; Munich City Centre
2022	Munich	Germany	11–21 August	Gymnastics; Artistic gymnastics	14	50	300	Olympiahalle
2022	Munich	Germany	11–21 August	Rowing	24	30	660	Munich Olympic Regatta Course
2022	Munich	Germany	11–21 August	Triathlon	3	30	120	Olympiapark (Munich)
2022	Munich	Germany	11–21 August	Sport climbing	8	30	300	Munich City Centre (Königsplatz)
2022	Munich	Germany	11–21 August	Table tennis	5	40	260	Rudi-Sedlmayer-Halle
2022	Munich	Germany	11–21 August	Volleyball; Beach volleyball	2	22	128	Munich City Centre (Königsplatz)
2022	Munich	Germany	11–21 August	Canoe; Canoe sprint	41	40	675	Munich Olympic Regatta Course

== European Championships Trophy ==
The European Championships Trophy, one of the unifying elements of the multi-sport event, is awarded to the nation that finishes top of the overall medal table featuring all participating sports.

Year	Host cities	Host countries	Medal events	Dates	European Championships Trophy medal table		
Year	Host cities	Host countries	Medal events	Dates	Winner	Second	Third
2018	Glasgow; Berlin	United Kingdom; Germany	187	2–12 August	Russia	Great Britain	Italy
2022	Munich	Germany	176	11–21 August	Germany	Great Britain	Italy
2026	not held						

== Medal table ==
after 2022 European Championships:

Rank	Nation	Gold	Silver	Bronze	Total
1	Great Britain (GBR)	50	45	39	134
2	Germany (GER)	39	37	37	113
3	Russia (RUS)	31	19	16	66
4	Italy (ITA)	29	35	47	111
5	France (FRA)	24	31	37	92
6	Netherlands (NED)	24	22	25	71
7	Hungary (HUN)	18	11	9	38
8	Poland (POL)	17	22	21	60
9	Ukraine (UKR)	13	21	14	48
10	Spain (ESP)	12	17	22	51
11	Switzerland (SUI)	11	9	13	33
12	Romania (ROU)	11	6	8	25
13	Greece (GRE)	10	7	2	19
14	Norway (NOR)	10	3	4	17
15	Belgium (BEL)	9	8	12	29
16	Sweden (SWE)	9	5	6	20
17	Portugal (POR)	6	4	2	12
18	Croatia (CRO)	5	2	3	10
19	Austria (AUT)	4	3	5	12
20	Belarus (BLR)	4	2	3	9
21	Czech Republic (CZE)	3	7	4	14
22	Lithuania (LTU)	3	6	5	14
23	Slovenia (SLO)	3	6	3	12
24	Israel (ISR)	3	2	3	8
25	Denmark (DEN)	2	7	5	14
25	Turkey (TUR)	2	7	5	14
27	Ireland (IRL)	2	3	3	8
28	Finland (FIN)	2	1	3	6
–	Authorised Neutral Athletes (ANA)^{[1]}	1	3	2	6
29	Serbia (SRB)	1	2	1	4
30	Armenia (ARM)	1	1	1	3
31	Iceland (ISL)	1	1	0	2
31	Latvia (LAT)	1	1	0	2
33	Albania (ALB)	1	0	0	1
33	Cyprus (CYP)	1	0	0	1
35	Slovakia (SVK)	0	2	1	3
36	Bulgaria (BUL)	0	1	1	2
37	Azerbaijan (AZE)	0	1	0	1
37	Moldova (MDA)	0	1	0	1
37	Montenegro (MNE)	0	1	0	1
40	Estonia (EST)	0	0	2	2
41	Luxembourg (LUX)	0	0	1	1
Totals (41 entries)		363	362	365	1,090

Notes

^[1] Not included in the official medal table.

== See also ==
- European Championship
- European Games
