= Tegwen Matthews =

Welsh amateur golfer

Personal information
- Nationality: Wales
- Born: 2 October 1955 (age 71) Cardiff, Wales

Career
- Sport: Golf
- Status: Amateur

Tegwen Matthews (née Perkins, formerly Thomas (1979–1987), born 2 October 1955) is a Welsh amateur golfer. She played in four successive Curtis Cup matches from 1974 to 1980, the first Welsh woman to compete in the event.

== Golf career ==
Matthews won the Welsh Girls’ Championship in 1970 at the age of 14, beating Pamela Light 3&1 in the 18-hole final. She also reached the final in 1973, losing to Vicki Rawlings at the 19th hole. She competed for Wales in the Girls Home Internationals from 1970 to 1973 but missed the 1974 event at Dunbar as she was returning from the Curtis Cup match in America. She returned in time to play in the Girls Amateur Championship the following week, reaching the final, but losing by one hole to Ruth Barry.

Matthews's first important win was as a 17-year-old, in the 1973 Wills Women's International Match Play at Wentworth, where she beat Prue Riddiford in the 36-hole final. In 1974 she was runner-up in the Ladies' British Open Amateur Stroke Play Championship at Seaton Carew, finishing three strokes behind Julia Greenhalgh. Playing with Mary McKenna, she won the Avia Foursomes in 1977, a stroke ahead of Sandra Needham and Angela Uzielli. The pair were also runners-up in the event in 1978 and 1980. Matthews won the Welsh Ladies' Amateur Championship twice, in 1976 and 1977 and was runner-up in 1983. She also won the Welsh Women's Open Stroke Play Championship in 1980 and was runner-up three times.

From 1973 to 1980, Matthews was a regular competitor for Great Britain and Ireland in international matches. She played in four successive Curtis Cup matches from 1974 to 1980, the first Welsh woman to compete in the event. In 1974 she was selected as first reserve but joined the team when Ann Irvin withdrew through injury. She also played four times against the Continent of Europe in the Vagliano Trophy from 1973 to 1979. She played in the 1974 Espirito Santo Trophy in the Dominican Republic, where the team of three finished joint runners-up and twice for Britain in the Commonwealth Trophy, at Ganton in 1975 and in Australia in 1979.

Matthews made her debut for Wales in the Women's Home Internationals in 1972 and competed in 13 successive events, making her final appearance in 1984. Wales were generally the weakest of the four home nations, only winning three matches during this period, all against Ireland, in 1973, 1975 and 1979. In 1976 they tied all three matches 4 1/2–4 1/2 and finished runners-up to England, who narrowly beat Scotland on the final day. She was also a regular competitor for Wales in the European Ladies' Team Championship.

Matthews was the non-playing captain of the winning 2012 Curtis Cup team, and was captain again in 2014.

== Team appearances ==
- Curtis Cup (representing Great Britain & Ireland): 1974, 1976, 1978, 1980, 2012 (non-playing captain, winners), 2014 (non-playing captain)
- Vagliano Trophy (representing Great Britain & Ireland): 1973 (winners), 1975 (winners), 1977 (winners), 1979 (tied)
- Espirito Santo Trophy (representing Great Britain & Ireland): 1974
- Commonwealth Trophy (representing Great Britain): 1975 (winners), 1979
- European Ladies' Team Championship (representing Wales): 1973, 1975, 1977, 1979, 1981, 1983
- Women's Home Internationals (representing Wales): 1972, 1973, 1974, 1975, 1976, 1977, 1978, 1979, 1980, 1981, 1982, 1983, 1984
- Girls Home Internationals (representing Wales): 1970, 1971, 1972, 1973
