= Charlotte Montgomery =

Swedish professional golfer (born 1958)

Personal information
- Nationality: Sweden
- Born: 24 August 1958 (age 68) Stockholm, Sweden

Career
- Sport: Golf
- College: Arizona State University
- Turned professional: 1981
- Former tours: LPGA Tour; Swedish Golf Tour
- Professional wins: 2

Best results in LPGA major championships
- Chevron Championship: T50: 1986
- U.S. Women's Open: T21: 1986
- du Maurier Classic: T39: 1983

Achievements and awards
- Swedish Golfer of the Year: 1983

Charlotte Montgomery (born 24 August 1958) is a Swedish professional golfer. She was one of the two players, who were the first female Swedes to play collegiate golf at a university in the United States and she was the first Swede to qualify for one of the main golf tours in the U.S.

== Early years ==
Montgomery was born in Stockholm, Sweden, as the second of three daughters to Henry and Barbro Montgomery. She is granddaughter of Ragnar Söderberg (1900–1974), who was a well-known businessman in Sweden and founder of one of Sweden's biggest investment companies.

In 1971, at 12 years and 10 months of age, Montgomery suddenly quit tennis, where she was a promising talent, and tried golf, supported by her mother.

From her early golfing years, through the main part of her amateur career, Montgomery represented Royal Drottningholm Golf Club, situated close to the royal palace Drottningholm, outside Stockholm, in the surroundings were the family used to spend the summers. Montgomery later also came to represent Falsterbo Golf Club.

Her nine years younger sister Alexandra, also reached youth elite level in Swedish golf.

Her mother Barbro was member of the board of the Swedish Golf Federation 1979–1986 and served as non-playing captain of the ladies' national junior team 1977–1979 and the ladies'national team 1979–1986.

== Amateur career ==
At junior level, Montgomery represented Sweden at the European Lady Junior's Team Championship five years in a row, the last three of them with her mother Barbro as non-playing captain and in 1978, at Is Molas Golf Club, Sardinia, Italy, the two of them could share the joy as winners, the first time ever for Sweden in this championship.

Her first individual international success was victory in the French International Lady Junior Championship for the Coupe Esmond in 1977, beating Eliane Berthet, France, 2 and 1 in the final at Golf de Saint-Cloud, outside Paris.

Montgomery played collegiate golf at Arizona State University 1977–1981, graduating with a Bachelor of Science in Physical Education and Psychology, in 1980 having made All-Conference Second Team. Together with Pia Nilsson, Montgomery was the first female Swede to play collegiate golf at a University in the United States.

She represented Sweden at the 1978 Espirito Santo Trophy, together with Liv Wollin and Kärstin Ehrnlund. High hopes were on the Swedish team, one stroke from second place with Montgomery fourth individually after three rounds, but with a bad last round from Montgomery and as Ehrnlund was forced to withdraw, Sweden dropped to eighth place.

Montgomery and her mother won the Swedish Mother and Daughter Championship, played as foursome, four years in a row 1978–1981 and again twice 1988–1989, when professionals were allowed to enter.

In 1980, she won one of the more prestigious amateur tournaments in the world, the North and South Women's Amateur at the Pinehurst Resort in Pinehurst, North Carolina, United States, beating Patti Rizzo, United States, in the final. Despite that, she was not appointed for the Swedish team at the 1980 Espirito Santo Trophy, to be played at Pinehurst.

In March 1981, she represented Sweden, together with Pia Nilsson, at an international World Cup team competition for two-women national teams in Cali, Colombia. Sweden won as a team, 7 strokes ahead of Spain, and Montgomery won individually.

Montgomery was a member of the winning Swedish team at the 1981 European Ladies' Team Championship, at Troia Golf Club, Portugal, again with her mother as non-playing captain. Montgomery also was individual medalist at the qualifying stroke-play. This was Sweden's first victory ever in this championship.

In Montgomery's 1981 try to defend her North and South title, she lost in the quarter finale to winner Patti Rizzo on the first extra hole.

As an amateur, she finished tied 6th in the 1981 Women's British Open at Northumberland Golf Club, Newcastle, England

In August 1981, she turned professional, at the same time as her friend Pia Nilsson, both with the goal to play on the LPGA Tour. Montgomery was selected for the Continent of Europe team to compete against Britain and Ireland at the 1981 Vagliano Trophy, but she could not take part, as she had turned professional.

== Professional career ==
In United States, she played 15 tournaments on the WPGT mini tour, mainly in California 1981–1982, finishing top 4 in eight of them and winning the Coors Classic in Texas, earning US$12,000 on the mini-tour season. In January 1982, she failed in her first try to qualify for the LPGA Tour, missing the cut after 36 holes at the qualifying school at Bent Tree in Sarasota, Florida.

In July 1982, she became the first Swedish born player to qualify as a member on one of the main U.S.-based golf tours, when she succeeded through the LPGA Tour Qualifying School at Ravenaux Country Club outside Houston, Texas.

She came close to win the 1982 Women's British Open at Royal Birkdale, England, in August, leading after three rounds, but fell back to a tied 5th place with Debbie Massey and Cathy Panton, three strokes from winner Marta Figueras-Dotti. After that, she went back to United States for her LPGA debut at the Boston Five Classic.

During 1983, she moved to Florida, United States, and worked with swing coach David Leadbetter and mental coach Jo Anne Whitaker. Her first LPGA Tour top ten finish came at the 1983 Henredon Classic at Willow Creek Country Club in High Point, North Carolina, where she finished tied 6th.

During her six seasons on the LPGA Tour, her best performances was two second-place finishes in 1983. She lost in a playoff to JoAnne Carner at the 1983 Portland Ping Championship in Portland, Oregon in September. Less than a month later, she also finished second at the 1983 San Jose Classic at the Almaden Golf & Country Club in San Jose, California, one stroke behind winner Kathy Postlewait. Montgomery finished a career-best 35th on the 1983 LPGA Tour money list.

In August 1984, Montgomery made a short visit to Sweden, now representing Falsterbo Golf Club, and won the Swedish International at Söderåsen Golf Club, which, from this season, was transformed from an amateur tournament to a professional one.

The following years Montgomery failed to maintain her form on the LPGA Tour and placed further down the money rankings. In late 1985, Montgomery left her swing coach David Leadbetter to start working with Michael Hebron.

In 1987, she retired from the LPGA Tour, after seven tournaments with a best season finish of 32nd at the Sarasota Classic.

== Awards and honors, private life ==
In 1980, Montgomery earned Elite Sign No. 66 by the Swedish Golf Federation, on the basis of national team appearances and national championship performances.

Her achievements on the LPGA Tour earned her the 1983 Swedish Golfer of the Year award, male and female, amateur and professional. This was the first time a professional received the award and since then no amateur has.

At the beginning of 1989, after retiring from tournament golf, Montgomery moved back to Stockholm, Sweden, from United States, to work as an assistant club pro at her old club, Royal Drottningholm.

In 1992, she married Swedish professional golfer Per-Arne Brostedt, who twice won the Swedish PGA Championship, and the two of them won the 1993 Swedish Championship for married couples, played as foursome. Together they ran a Golf Academy in the early 1990s.

She was a member of the Elite Golf Committee of the Swedish Golf Federation 1989–1995, during the era of a breakthrough for Swedish women's golf internationally. Swedish major tournament winner Helen Alfredsson has given credit to Montgomery as one of the individuals most influencing her career.

Since 2005, Montgomery lives in Nevada City, California, close to the Nevada boarder, working with giving advice for athletic performance and well-being.

== Amateur wins ==
- 1977 French International Lady Junior Championship
- 1978 Ekoxen Trophy (Linköping GC), Falkenberg Open
- 1979 Swedish National Team selection tournament 72 holes (Båstad GC)
- 1980 North and South Women's Amateur
- 1981 World Cup (Cali, Colombia) (team with Pia Nilsson and individual)

== Professional wins (2) ==
=== Other wins (1) ===
No.	Date	Tournament	Winning score	Margin of victory	Runner(s)-up
1	11 Aug 1984	Swedish International	+9 (76-76-77-72=301)	1 stroke	(Denmark) Anette Peitesen

Note: The women's Swedish Golf Tour was established in 1986 and its schedule included the Swedish International, which became a professional tournament in 1984.

=== WPGT wins (1) ===
- 1982 Coors Classic

== Playoff record ==
LPGA Tour playoff record (0–1)

No.	Year	Tournament	Opponent	Result
1	1983	Portland Ping Championship	(United States) JoAnne Carner	Lost to birdie on first extra hole

== Team appearances ==
Amateur

- European Lady Junior's Team Championship (representing Sweden): 1975, 1976, 1977, 1978 (winners), 1979
- European Ladies' Team Championship (representing Sweden): 1977, 1979, 1981 (winners)
- Espirito Santo Trophy (representing Sweden): 1978
- World Cup (Cali, Colombia): 1981 (winners)
