= 1977 European Ladies' Team Championship =

Golf competition

Tournament information
- Dates: 6–10 July 1977
- Location: Sotogrande, Spain; 36°16′35″N 5°18′4″W
- Course: Real Club de Golf Sotogrande
- Organized by: European Golf Association
- Format: 36 holes stroke play Knock-out match-play

Statistics
- Par: 72
- Field: 14 teams circa 70 players

Champion
- England; Mary Everard, Julia Greenhalgh, Dinah Henson, Beverly Huke, Vanessa Marvin, Angela Uzielli
- Qualification round: 609 (+33); Final match 6–1

Location map
- Location in Europe Location in Andalusia Location in Province of Cádiz Club de Golf; Sotogrande (Province of Cádiz)

The 1977 European Ladies' Team Championship took place 6–10 July at Real Club de Golf Sotogrande in Sotogrande, Province of Cádiz, Spain. It was the tenth women's golf amateur European Ladies' Team Championship.

== Venue ==
The hosting club was founded in 1964 and the course was designed by Robert Trent Jones. It had previously hosted the men's professional Open de España in 1966. In 1994, His Majesty King Juan Carlos I granted to Sotogrande the title of Real.

The championship course was set up with par 72.

== Format ==
All participating teams played two qualification rounds of stroke-play with up to five players, counted the four best scores for each team.

The eight best teams formed flight A, in knock-out match-play over the next three days. The teams were seeded based on their positions after the stroke-play. The first placed team was drawn to play the quarter-final against the eight placed team, the second against the seventh, the third against the sixth and the fourth against the fifth. In each match between two nation teams, two 18-hole foursome games and five 18-hole single games were played. Teams were allowed to switch players during the team matches, selecting other players in to the afternoon single games after the morning foursome games. Games all square after 18 holes were declared halved, if the team match was already decided.

The six teams placed 9–14 in the qualification stroke-play formed Flight B, to play similar knock-out play to decide their final positions.

== Teams ==
14 nation teams contested the event. Each team consisted of a minimum of four players.

Players in the leading teams

Country	Players
Belgium	Louise Van den Berghe, Maguy Brose, Isabelle Declerq, Marianne Toussaint, Francoise De Wagheneire
England	Mary Everard, Julia Greenhalgh, Dinah Henson, Beverly Huke, Vanessa Marvin, Angela Uzielli
France	Martine Giraud, Nathalie Jeanson, A. Lanzerac, Marie-Laure de Lorenzi, Cécilia Mourgue d'Algue, Anne Marie Palli
Ireland	Mary Gorry, Mary McKenna, Claire Nesbitt Robinson
Italy	Boeri, Minette Marazza, Eva Ragher, Rindi, Pischiutta, P. Tolomei
Scotland	C. Lugton, Sandra Needham, Joan Smith, Cathy Panton, Muriel Thomson
Spain	Elena Corominas, Marta Figueras-Dotti, Emma Villacieros de García-Ogara, Cristina Marsans, Carmen Maestre de Pellon
Sweden	Monica Andersson, Hillevi Hagström, Anna Skanse Dönnestad, Charlotte Montgomery, Pia Nilsson, Liv Wollin
Wales	Audrey Briggs, Pam Light, Tegwen Perkins, Vicki Rawlings, Pamela Whitley Valentine
West Germany	Marietta Gütermann, Susanne Schultz, Jeannette Weghmann, Barbara Böhm, Marion Thannhäuser

Other participating teams

Country
Denmark
Netherlands
Norway
Switzerland

== Winners ==
Host nation Spain won the opening 36-hole competition, with a score of 28 over par 604, five strokes ahead of team England. Defending champions France finished another three strokes back on third place.

Individual leader in the opening 36-hole stroke-play qualifying competition was Cristina Marsans, Spain, with a score of 3-under-par 141, six strokes ahead of Vanessa Marvin, England, and Anna Skanse Dönnestad, Sweden. With her score of 69 in the second round, Marsans was the only player with a round under par.

Louise Van den Berghe, Belgium, made a hole-in-one on the par 3, 110 meters, 17th hole during the first round of the stroke-play competition.

Team England won the championship, earning their fifth title, beating Spain in the final 6–1. Team Sweden, earned third place, finishing on the podium for the fourth time, beating Scotland 4 1/2–2 1/2 in the third place match.

== Results ==
Qualification round

Team standings

Place	Country	Score	To par
1	Spain	301-303=604	+28
2	England	303-306=609	+33
3	France	309-303=612	+36
4	Italy	309-311=620	+44
5	Sweden	316-305=621	+45
6	Scotland	314-310=624	+48
T7	West Germany *	309-320=629	+53
T7	Ireland	310-319=629	+53
9	Wales	311-330=641	+65
10	Norway	324-323=647	+71
11	Switzerland	326-333=659	+83
12	Denmark	323-337=660	+84
13	Belgium	326-336=662	+86
14	Netherlands	334-341=675	+99

* Note: In the event of a tie the order was determined by the better non-counting score.

Individual leaders

Place	Player	Country	Score	To par
1	Cristina Marsans	Spain	72-69=141	-3
T2	Vanessa Marvin	England	74-73=147	+3
T2	Anna Skanse Dönnestad	Sweden	75-72=147	+3
4	Nathalie Jeanson	France	76-73=149	+5
T5	Hillevi Hagström	Sweden	76-75=151	+7
T5	Anne Marie Palli	France	78-73=151	+7

Note: There was no official award for the lowest individual score.

Flight A

Bracket

Quarter finals
England	5
West Germany	2
Scotland	4
France	3
Sweden	5
Italy	2
Spain	5.5
Ireland	1.5

Semi finals
England	5
Scotland	2
Spain	4
Sweden	3

Final
England	6
Spain	1
Bronze match
Sweden	4.5
Scotland	2.5

Elimination matches
France	4
West Germany	3
Italy	4.5
Ireland	2.5

Match for 5th place
France	4.5
Italy	2.5
Match for 7th place
Ireland	4
West Germany	3

Final games

England	Spain
6	1
V. Marvin / M. Everard 2 & 1	C. Maestre de Pellon / C. Marsans
J. Greenhalgh / A. Uzielli	E. Corominas / M. Figueras-Dotti 1 hole
Vanessa Marvin 1 hole	Emma Villacieros de García-Ogara
Angela Uzielli 1 hole	Cristina Marsans
Mary Everard 2 & 1	Elena Corominas
Julia Greenhalgh 3 & 2	Carmen Maestre de Pellon
Dinah Henson 4 & 3	Marta Figueras-Dotti

Flight B

Bracket

Round 1
Switzerland	4.5
Netherlands	2.5
Belgium	4
Denmark	3

Round 2
Switzerland
Norway
Wales
Belgium

Match for 9th place
Wales	4
Switzerland	3
Match for 11th place
Belgium	4
Norway	3

Round 1

Match for 13th place
Netherlands	4.5
Denmark	2.5

Final standings

Place	Country
1st place, gold medalist(s)	England
2nd place, silver medalist(s)	Spain
3rd place, bronze medalist(s)	Sweden
4	Scotland
5	France
6	Italy
7	Ireland
8	West Germany
9	Wales
10	Switzerland
11	Belgium
12	Norway
13	Netherlands
14	Denmark

== See also ==
- Espirito Santo Trophy – biennial world amateur team golf championship for women organized by the International Golf Federation.
- European Amateur Team Championship – European amateur team golf championship for men organised by the European Golf Association.
