= Liv Wollin =

Swedish golfer (born 1945)

Personal information
- Full name: Liv Wollin
- Nationality: Sweden
- Born: 17 April 1945 (age 81) Stockholm, Sweden
- Spouse: Paul Wollin (m. 1972–1987)
- Children: 1

Career
- Sport: Golf
- Turned professional: 1983

Achievements and awards
- Swedish Golfer of the Year: 1966, 1968

Liv Wollin (née Forsell) (born 17 April 1945) is a Swedish professional golfer, who is regarded as having been one of the best Swedish female amateur players ever.

== Early life ==
Wollin grew up in Lidingö outside Stockholm, Sweden, as the only girl among five siblings. Her parents were Jacob Forsell and Mette, nee Grut, and they were not golfers. She started out golf in 1958 as a caddie at Lidingö Golf Club close to their house. With few girls playing the game in those days, she usually played with boys. Her older brother Joachim (called "Kim") and Swedish elite amateur Gustav Adolf Bielke were both role models for her while learning the game at young age. She always preferred to develop her golfing abilities by playing on the course instead of practicing a lot on the driving range. Her swing technique was characterized by a short and quick backswing, just like the one of G. A. Bielke.

Besides golf, she also practiced, curling, bowling, table tennis and squash.

By saving money, received from her father, who was a medical doctor, for not smoking before 18 years of age, she financed a Volkswagen Beetle car, to travel with between golf tournaments in Sweden in the early 1960s, often with best golfing friend Cecilia Perslow (who 1967 married French golfer Gaëtan Mourgue d'Algue). Wollin and Perslow in 1966 came to meet each other in the final of the Swedish Match-play Championship when Perslow was the defending champion. Wollin won the match, played at Perslow's home course Örebro Golf Club.

== Amateur career ==
She became the first Swedish golfer with international success and had a long amateur career. Despite playing mostly in Scandinavia, she several times proved to be among the best female amateur golfers in the world. She represented Lidingö Golf Club until 1969 and, after moving to the very south-west end of Sweden, Falsterbo Golf Club since 1970.

In 1963, 18 years old, she won two of the three championships, at that time considered as the three major amateur championships in Sweden. She also won individually the stroke-play part at the European Ladies' Team Championship. The same year, she advanced to the third round of the British Ladies Amateur, a feat she repeated in 1965 at St Andrews.

Wollin reached the final of the Swedish closed Matchplay Championship eleven times and won ten of them. Winning the title for the eight time in 1973 at Halmstad Golf Club, she had to play 39 holes in the final against Anna Skanse. Wollin was pregnant in her sixth month, six holes down after 21 holes and never leading the final until the end after the third extra hole.

In 1980, Wollin became the first Swedish golfer to reach the final of the British Ladies Amateur at Woodhall Spa Golf Club, where she lost 3 and 1 to Anne Sander, United States. 12 years earlier, in 1968, Wollin reached the semi-finals.

Wollin also won the open amateur championships of Sweden, Morocco and Portugal.

Wollin represented Sweden in ten consecutive World Amateur Team Golf Championships, the Espirito Santo Trophy, between 1964 and 1982, a record beaten only by Marina Ragher from Italy. In 1966 in Mexico City, Wollin finished tied fourth individually. For the 1968 Espirito Santo Trophy in Melbourne, Australia, the Swedish Golf Federation decided, by economic reasons, to not send a team, but Wollin initiated to collect the necessary sponsorship to make the trip. In the end, the Swedish team finished fourth and Wollin sixth individually. In 1972 in Buenos Aires, Wollin, together with Christina Westerberg and Birgit Forsman, earned the first ever Swedish medal in the amateur worlds, men or women, when the Swedish team finished third, while Wollin finished tied third with Laura Baugh in the individual competition. In the 1976 event, Wollin again finished tied third, this time with Debbie Massey, after winner Nancy Lopez and runner-up Catherine Lacoste.

At the 1975 European Ladies' Team Championship at Golf de Saint-Cloud, outside Paris, France, Wollin again won individually at the qualification competition, as she did 12 years earlier. In the quarter-final between Sweden and, champions to be, France, Wollin defeated former U.S. Women's Open champion Catherine Lacoste, 3 and 2, on Lacoste's home soil.

In 1981, she was a member of the winning Swedish team at the European Ladies' Team Championship in Portugal, together with Hillewi Hagström, Viveca Hoff, Gisela Linnér, Charlotte Montgomery and Pia Nilsson.

When Wollin finally turned professional in 1983, she was 38 years old and her long and successful career was almost coming to its end. Up and coming Swedish stars Kärstin Ehrnlund and Liselotte Neumann, at that period of time, turned professional as teenagers.

== Awards, honors ==
In 1963, 18 years old, Wollin earned Elite Sign No. 41 by the Swedish Golf Federation, on the basis of national team appearances and national championship performances.

Wollin was twice awarded Swedish Golfer of the Year, male and female, 1966 and 1968. (Until 1976, there was a rule stating that a player not could receive the award more than two times.)

In 1966, she was awarded Swedish Sportswomen of the Year.

In 1984, she received The Golden Club ("Guldklubban") by the Swedish Golf Federation for contributions to Swedish golf.

In 2007, Wollin was awarded the Merit Sign in Gold by the PGA of Sweden, as its 34th recipient.

In 2022, Wollin was the sixth person to be inducted into the newly founded Swedish Golf Hall of Fame.

== Personal life ==
During her early amateur career, she worked as a school teacher. At the beginning of 1970, she moved from Stockholm to the province of Scania in southern Sweden, to work at Club Golf, an indoor golf training facility in Malmö.

She won the Swedish Championship in curling in 1964.

Her brother Jacob Forsell (1942–2023), was a well-known Swedish photographer.

She was married to Paul Wollin (1946–1990) from 1972 to 1987. In 1985, the two of them won the Swedish Championship for married couples, played as foursome. Their daughter Anna was born in 1973.

She was a member of the board of the Swedish Golf Federation from 1994 to 1997. She is an honorary member of Falsterbo Golf Club and The Swedish Golf Historical Society.

== Amateur wins ==
- 1962 Swedish Junior Match-play Championship
- 1963 Swedish Match-play Championship, Scandinavian International Match-play Championship
- 1964 Swedish Match-play Championship, Swedish International Stroke-play Championship, Scandinavian International Match-play Championship
- 1965 Scandinavian International Match-play Championship
- 1966 Swedish Match-play Championship, Swedish International Stroke-play Championship, Swedish Junior Match-play Championship
- 1967 Swedish Match-play Championship, Scandinavian International Match-play Championship, Portuguese International Ladies Amateur Championship
- 1968 Swedish Match-play Championship
- 1969 Swedish Match-play Championship, Swedish International Stroke-play Championship
- 1970 Swedish International Stroke-play Championship, Scandinavian International Match-play Championship
- 1971 Swedish International Stroke-play Championship, Scandinavian International Match-play Championship
- 1972 Swedish Match-play Championship, Swedish International Stroke-play Championship, Scandinavian International Match-play Championship, Morocco Ladies Open Amateur Championship
- 1973 Swedish Match-play Championship, Morocco Ladies Open Amateur Championship
- 1976 Swedish Match-play Championship
- 1977 Swedish International Stroke-play Championship
- 1979 Swedish International Stroke-play Championship
- 1980 Swedish Match-play Championship

== Team appearances ==
Amateur

- European Ladies' Team Championship (representing Sweden): 1963, 1965, 1967, 1969, 1971, 1975, 1977, 1979, 1981 (winners)
- Vagliano Trophy (representing the Continent of Europe): 1963, 1965 (winners), 1967 (winners), 1969 (winners), 1971, 1975, 1977, 1981 (winners)
- Espirito Santo Trophy (representing Sweden): 1964, 1966, 1968, 1970, 1972, 1974, 1976, 1978, 1980, 1982
