= Cristina Marsans =

Spanish amateur golfer

Personal information
- Full name: Cristina Marsans Astoreca
- Nationality: Spain
- Born: 9 May 1946 Madrid, Spain
- Died: 26 August 2018 (aged 72) Madrid, Spain
- Spouse: Alfredo Goyeneche
- Children: 2 (Javier and Sandra)

Career
- Sport: Golf
- Status: Amateur

Cristina Marsans Astoreca (9 May 1946 – 26 August 2018) also known as Marquesa de Artasona, was a Spanish golfer, best known for popularizing competitive golf in Spain.

== Early life ==
Marsans was the daughter of Enrique Marsans, founder of the first travel agency in Spain.

== Amateur career ==
She represented Spain at the world amateur team championship, the Espirito Santo Trophy, on six occasions and at the European Ladies' Team Championship on nine occasions. At the 1977 European Championship at Sotogrande in Spain, her team finished silver medalists, as well as in 1975, and she won the individual stroke-play part of the competition herself, six strokes ahead of the nearest competitors.

== Royal Spanish Golf Federation ==
After her sport career, she became part of the Board of the Royal Spanish Golf Federation, in different positions: President of the Women's Committee (1988-1992); Vice President of the Women's Committee (1998 and 2006); member of the Disciplinary Committee and member of the Honors Committee (until 2005).

From the RFEG she promoted the creation of the "Green Wood Awards of Environmental Responsibility" for Spanish golf courses as well as the "Human Values Awards", to promote values of solidarity and care for the environment. She especially focused on issues related to quality, design and environment, encouraging clubs to take the necessary steps to obtain ISO 14001 certification.

== Private life ==
She married Alfredo Goyeneche, an aristocrat and Olympic rider, who became president of the Spanish Olympic Committee and died in a car accident in 2002 at the age of 65, already separated from Marsans. They had two children together, Javier and Sandra.

== Awards ==
- Gold Medal for Golf Merit (1975)

== Amateur wins ==
- Six Spanish Amateur Championships: 1968, 1972, 1973, 1974, 1975 and 1978
- Three Spanish Foursome Championships: 1965, 1972 and 1973
- Four individual Spanish International Ladies Amateur Championships: 1965, 1977, 1979 and 1981.
- Two Spanish International Foursome Championships: 1965 and 1971.
- One Spanish Mixed Championship: 1972.
- One Italian International Amateur Championship: 1975.
- Three Copa de Jerez (Sotogrande): 1972, 1975 and 1981.

== Senior amateur wins ==
- 1999 Spain Individual Senior Championship, Spain Senior Foursome Championship, Spain Senior International Foursome Championship
- 2000 Spain Senior Foursome Championship
- 2001 Spain Senior Foursome Championship, Spain Senior International Foursome Championship
- 2003 Portugal International Senior Championship
- 2004 Spain Individual Senior Championship
- 2005 Spain Senior Foursome Championship

== Team appearances ==
Amateur

- European Ladies' Team Championship (representing Spain): 1963, 1965, 1969, 1971, 1973, 1975, 1977, 1979, 1981
- Vagliano Trophy (representing the Continent of Europe): 1975, 1981 (winners)
- Espirito Santo Trophy (representing Spain): 1970, 1972, 1974, 1976, 1978, 1982
