= 1973 European Ladies' Team Championship =

Golf competition

Tournament information
- Dates: 5–8 July 1973
- Location: Brussels, Belgium; 50°49′N 4°29′E
- Course: Royal Golf Club de Belgique
- Organized by: European Golf Association
- Format: 18 holes stroke play Knock-out match-play

Statistics
- Par: 74
- Length: 6,308 yards (5,768 m)
- Field: 13 teams circa 65 players

Champion
- England; Linda Denison-Pender, Mary Everard, Ann Irvin, Carol le Feuvre, Mickey Walker
- Qualification round: 309 (+13); Final match: 4–3

Location map
- Location in Europe Location in Belgium Location in Brussels

The 1973 European Ladies' Team Championship took place 5–8 July at Royal Golf Club de Belgique, 7 kilometres south-east of the city center of Brussels, Belgium. It was the eighth women's golf amateur European Ladies' Team Championship.

== Format ==
All participating teams, allowed to have six players, played one qualification round of stroke-play with five players, counted the four best scores for each team.

The six best teams formed flight A, in knock-out match-play over the next three days. The teams were seeded based on their positions after the stroke play. The teams place first and second were directly qualified for the semi-finals. The team placed third was drawn to play the quarter-final against the team placed sixth and the teams placed fourth and fifth met each other. In each match between two nation teams, two 18-hole foursome games and five 18-hole single games were played. Teams were allowed to switch players during the team matches, selecting other players in to the afternoon single games after the morning foursome games. Games all square after 18 holes were declared halved, if the team match was already decided.

The four teams placed 7–10 in the qualification stroke-play formed Flight B and the three teams placed 11–13 formed Flight C, to meet each other to decide their final positions.

== Teams ==
13 nation teams contested the event. Each team consisted of a minimum of four players.

Players in the leading teams

Country	Players
England	Linda Denison Pender, Mary Everard, Ann Irvin, Carol le Feuvre, Suzanne Parker, Mickey Walker
France	Odile Semelaigne-Garaïalde, Georges Labesse, Anne Marie Palli, A. Robert, Brigitte Varangot
Ireland	Mary Gorry, Josephine Mark, Maise Mooney, Mary McKenna
Italy	Federica Dassù, Isa Goldschmidt Bevione, Minette Marazza, Eva Ragher, Marina Ragher Ciaffi
Scotland	Catherine Panton, Joan Rennie, Belle Robertson, Mary Walker, Maureen Walker, Janette Wright
Spain	Ana Monfort de Albox, Otilia Bonny, Elena Corominas, Emma Villacieros de García-Ogara, Cristina Marsans, Carmen Maestre de Pellon
Sweden	Monica Andersson, Monica Hagström Nordlund, Viveca Hoff, Anna Skanse Dönnestad, Ann-Katrin Svensson, Christina Westerberg
Wales	Audrey Briggs, Amanda Gale, Christine Phipps, Tegwen Perkins, Vicki Rawlings
West Germany	Elisabeth Buckup, Marietta Gütermann, Susanne Schultz, Jeannette Weghmann, Barbara Zintl

Other participating teams

Country
Belgium
Denmark
Netherlands
Switzerland

== Winners ==
Defending champion team England won the opening 18-hole competition, with a score of 13 over par 309, one stroke ahead of three times champion France.

Individual leader in the opening 18-hole stroke-play qualifying competition was Mary Everard, England, with a score of 4-under-par 70, three shots ahead of 17-year-old Federica Dassù, Italy. Everard's round included four birdies and an eagle. There was no official award for the lowest individual score.

The first three places went to the same nations as at the previous championship two years earlier. Team England won the championship, earning their fourth title, beating France in the final 4–3. Team Sweden finished third for the third time, beating Spain 4–3 in the third place match.

== Results ==
Qualification round

Team standings

Place	Country	Score	To par
1	England *	309	+13
2	France	310	+14
3	Ireland	312	+16
4	Sweden	319	+23
5	Italy	322	+26
T6	Spain *	323	+27
T6	Netherlands	323	+27
8	Scotland	324	+28
9	Wales	328	+32
10	Switzerland	332	+36
11	West Germany	336	+40
12	Belgium	342	+46
13	Denmark	351	+55

* Note: In the event of a tie the order was determined by the better non-counting score.

Individual leaders

Place	Player	Country	Score	To par
1	Mary Everard	England	70	−4
2	Federica Dassù	Italy	73	−1
T3	Anne Marie Palli	France	74	E
T3	Belle Robertson	Scotland	74	E

Note: There was no official award for the lowest individual score.

Flight A

Bracket

Quarter finals
Sweden	6
Italy	1
Spain	5
Ireland	2

Semi finals
England	7
Sweden	0
France	5.5
Spain	1.5

Final
England	4
France	3
Bronze match
Sweden	4
Spain	3

Match for 5th place
Italy
Ireland

−

Final games

Italy	France
4	3
A. Irvin / M. Everard	B. Varangot / O. Semelaigne Garaïalde 2 & 1
M. Walker / L. Denison Pender Bayman 6 & 5	G. Labesse / A. M. Palli
Ann Irvin	Brigitte Varangot 2 & 1
Mary Everard 2 holes	Anne Marie Palli
Mickey Walker 2 holes	Odile Semelaigne Garaïalde
Linda Denison Pender Bayman	A. Robert 2 & 1
Carol le Feuvre 7 & 5	G. Labesse

Flight B

Elimination matches
Netherlands	5
Switzerland	2
Scotland	6
Wales	1

Match for 7th place
Scotland	5
Netherlands	2
Match for 9th place
Switzerland	4
Wales	3

Final standings

Place	Country
1st place, gold medalist(s)	England
2nd place, silver medalist(s)	France
3rd place, bronze medalist(s)	Sweden
4	Spain
5	Italy
6	Ireland
7	Scotland
8	Netherlands
9	Switzerland
10	Wales
11	West Germany
12	Belgium
13	Denmark

== See also ==
- Espirito Santo Trophy – biennial world amateur team golf championship for women organized by the International Golf Federation.
- European Amateur Team Championship – European amateur team golf championship for men organised by the European Golf Association.
