= 1979 European Ladies' Team Championship =

Golf competition

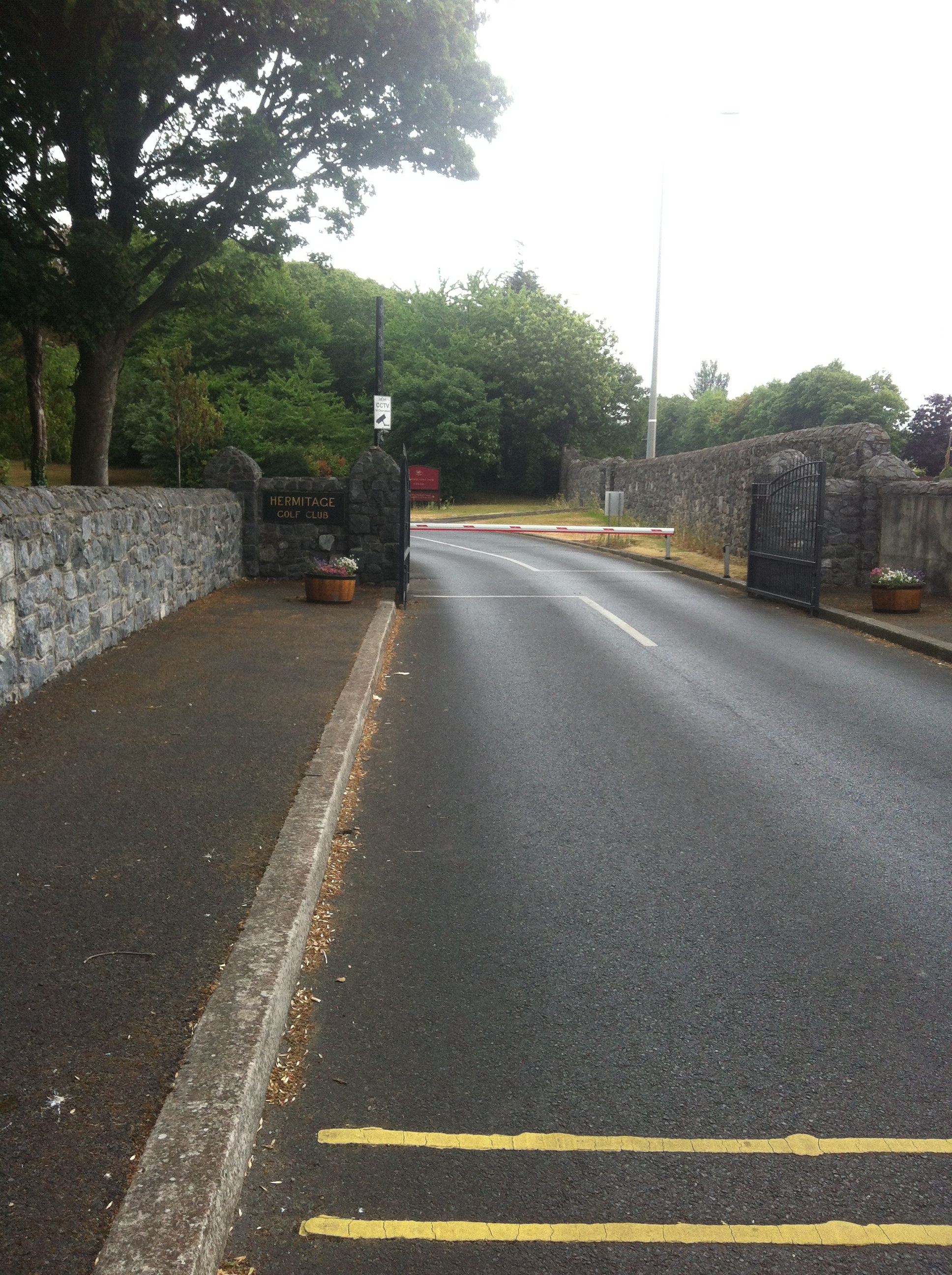
- Entrance to Hermitage Golf Club

Tournament information
- Dates: 4–8 July 1979
- Location: Lucan, Dublin, Ireland; 53.3632°N 6.4132°W
- Course: Hermitage Golf Club
- Organized by: European Golf Association
- Format: 36 holes stroke play Knock-out match-play

Statistics
- Par: 73
- Field: 14 teams 84 players

Champion
- Ireland; Rona Hegarty, Mary Gorry, Susan Gorman, Maureen Madill, Mary McKenna, Claire Nesbitt
- Qualification round: 769 (+39); Final match 6–1

Location map
- Location in Europe Location on the British Isles Location in Ireland Location in the Dublin Area

The 1979 European Ladies' Team Championship took place 4–8 July at Hermitage Golf Club in Lucan, Dublin, Ireland. It was the eleventh women's golf amateur European Ladies' Team Championship.

== Venue ==
The hosting club was founded in 1905 and the course, a mature parkland setting, situated 12 kilometers west of the city center of Dublin, was designed by James McKenna.

The championship course was set up with par 73.

== Format ==
All participating teams played two qualification rounds of stroke-play with six players, counted the five best scores for each team.

The eight best teams formed flight A, in knock-out match-play over the next three days. The teams were seeded based on their positions after the stroke-play. The first placed team was drawn to play the quarter-final against the eight placed team, the second against the seventh, the third against the sixth and the fourth against the fifth. In each match between two nation teams, two 18-hole foursome games and five 18-hole single games were played. Teams were allowed to switch players during the team matches, selecting other players in to the afternoon single games after the morning foursome games. Games all square after 18 holes were declared halved, if the team match was already decided.

The six teams placed 9–14 in the qualification stroke-play formed Flight B, to play similar knock-out play to decide their final positions.

== Teams ==
14 nation teams contested the event. Each team consisted of six players. Austria took part for the first time.

Players in the leading teams

Country	Players
England	Christine Barker, Julia Greenhalgh, Sue Hedges, Janet Melville, Linda Moore, Julie Walter
France	Eliane Berthét, Nathalie Jeanson, Catherine Lacoste de Prado, Marie-Laure de Lorenzi, Cécilia Mourgue d'Algue, Marie-Christine Ubald-Bocquet
Ireland	Rona Hegarty, Mary Gorry, Susan Gorman, Maureen Madill, Mary McKenna, Claire Nesbitt
Scotland	Wilma Aitken, Fiona Anderson, Lesley Hope, Joan Smith, Gillian Stewart, M. Stavert
Spain	Ana Monfort de Albox, Marta Figueras-Dotti, Cristina Marsans, Carmen Maestre de Pellon, Emma Villacieros de García-Ogara
Sweden	Hillevi Hagström, Viveca Hoff, Gisela Linnér, Charlotte Montgomery, Birgitta Werneskog, Liv Wollin
Switzerland	Annette Hadorn, Landolt, L. Ruckstuhl, Priscilla Staible, Pia Ullman, Marie-Christine de Werra
Wales	Audrey Briggs, Lisa Isherwood, Ann Johnson, Tegwen Perkins, Vicki Rawlings, Pamela Whitley Valentine
West Germany	Sabine Blecher, Barbara Böhm, Nicolle Eicke, Christine Felixmüller, Marion Thannhäuser, Ines Umsen

Other participating teams

Country
Austria
Belgium
Italy
Netherlands
Norway

== Winners ==
Four-times-champions team France won the opening 36-hole competition, with a score of 26 over par 756, three strokes ahead of team Spain.

Individual leader in the opening 36-hole stroke-play qualifying competition was Marta Figueras-Dotti, Spain, with a score of 3-under-par 143, three strokes ahead of Julia Greenhalgh, England.

The combined team from the host nation Republic of Ireland and Northern Ireland won the championship, earning their first title, beating West Germany in the final 6–1. Team France, earned third place, finishing on the podium for the eleventh time, beating England 5 1/2–1 1/2 in the third place match. With their third place, France had finished on the podium in all eleven European Ladies' Team Championships played since its inauguration in 1959.

== Results ==
Qualification round

Team standings

Place	Country	Score	To par
1	France	377-379=756	+26
2	Spain	378-381=759	+29
3	West Germany	389-375=764	+34
4	Ireland	378-391=769	+39
5	Sweden	383-388=771	+41
6	Switzerland	387-387=774	+44
7	England	400-381=781	+51
8	Scotland	389-393=782	+52
9	Netherlands	386-399=785	+55
10	Wales	404-385=789	+59
11	Italy	396-396=792	+62
12	Belgium	407-394=801	+71
13	Norway	421-427=848	+118
14	Austria	421-428=849	+119

Individual leaders

Place	Player	Country	Score	To par
1	Marta Figueras-Dotti	Spain	70-73=143	−3
2	Julia Greenhalgh	England	73-73=146	E
T3	Alice Janmaat	Netherlands	74-73=147	+1
T3	Marie-Laure de Lorenzi	France	73-74=147	+1
T3	Priscilla Staible	Switzerland	74-73=147	+1
6	Viveca Hoff	Sweden	75-73=148	+2
T7	Barbara Böhm	West Germany	72-77=149	+2
T7	Cécilia Mourgue d'Algue	France	73-76=149	+2
T9	Mary McKenna	Ireland	74-76=150	+3
T9	Claire Nesbitt	Ireland	72-78=150	+3

Note: There was no official award for the lowest individual score.

Flight A

Bracket

Quarter finals
France	5
Scotland	2
Ireland	4.5
Sweden	2.5
West Germany	4
Switzerland	3
England	5
Spain	2

Semi finals
Ireland	5.5
France	1.5
West Germany	4
England	3

Final
Ireland	6
West Germany	1
Bronze match
France	5.5
England	1.5

Elimination matches
Scotland	4
Sweden	3
Spain	5
Switzerland	2

Match for 5th place
Spain	5.5
Scotland	1.5
Match for 7th place
Sweden	5
Switzerland	2

Final games

Ireland	West Germany
6	1
McKenna / Nesbitt 3 & 2	Thannhäuser / Blecher
Madill / Gorry	Eicke / Umsen 22nd hole
Mary McKenna 6 & 5	Marion Thannhäuser
Maureen Madill 3 & 2	Barbara Böhm
Susan Gorman 3 & 1	Sabine Blecher
Claire Nesbitt 1 hole	Ines Umsen
Mary Gorry 4 & 3	Christine Felixmüller

Final standings

Place	Country
1st place, gold medalist(s)	Ireland
2nd place, silver medalist(s)	West Germany
3rd place, bronze medalist(s)	France
4	England
5	Spain
6	Scotland
7	Sweden
8	Switzerland
9	Netherlands
10	Wales
11	Belgium
12	Italy
13	Norway
14	Austria

== See also ==
- Espirito Santo Trophy – biennial world amateur team golf championship for women organized by the International Golf Federation.
- European Amateur Team Championship – European amateur team golf championship for men organised by the European Golf Association.
