= 1978 Espirito Santo Trophy =

Tournament information
- Dates: 10–13 October
- Location: Navua, Viti Levu, Fiji; 18.244°S 178.069°E
- Course: Pacific Harbour Golf & Country Club
- Organized by: World Amateur Golf Council
- Format: 72 holes stroke play

Statistics
- Par: 72
- Length: 5,823 yards (5,325 m)
- Field: 14 teams 42 players

Champion
- Australia; Lindy Goggin, Edwina Kennedy, Jane Lock
- 596 (+20)
- Location in the Pacific Ocean Location in Fiji

The 1978 Espirito Santo Trophy took place 10–13 October at Pacific Harbour Golf & Country Club in Navua, Viti Levu, Fiji. It was the eighth women's golf World Amateur Team Championship for the Espirito Santo Trophy. The tournament was a 72-hole stroke play team event with 14 team entries, each with three players. The best two scores for each round counted towards the team total.

The Australia team won the Trophy, winning their first title, beating team Canada by one stroke. Canada earned the silver medal and France took the bronze, five strokes further back.

== Teams ==
14 teams contested the event. Each team had three players.

Country	Players
Argentina	Amanda de Felicia, Susanna Garmendla, Beatriz Rossello
Australia	Lindy Goggin, Edwina Kennedy, Jane Lock
Canada	Marylin Palmer, Cathy Sherk, Stacey West
Fiji	Anna Dunn, Lydia Manueli, Adi Sai Tuivanuavou
France	Nathalie Jeanson, Catherine Lacoste de Prado, Marie-Laure de Lorenzi
(United Kingdom) Great Britain & Ireland	Mary Everard, Julia Greenhalgh, Muriel Thomson
Italy	Minette Marazza, Guenda Moavero, Marina Ragher
Japan	Haruko Ishii, Miki Oda, Machiko Yamada
New Zealand	Liz Douglas, Cherry Kingham, Heather Ryan
Spain	Marta Figueras-Dotti, Carmen Maestre de Pellon, Cristina Marsans
Sweden	Kärstin Ehrnlund, Charlotte Montgomery, Liv Wollin
Switzerland	Carole Charbonnier, Regine Lautens, Marie Christine de Werra
United States	Beth Daniel, Cindy Hill, Judith Oliver
West Germany	Barbara Böhm, Susanne Schultz, Marion Thannhauser

== Results ==
Place	Country	Score	To par
1st place, gold medalist(s)	Australia	149-143-151-153=596	+20
2nd place, silver medalist(s)	Canada	147-149-153-148=597	+21
3rd place, bronze medalist(s)	France	146-153-156-147=602	+26
T4	(United Kingdom) Great Britain & Ireland	145-151-153-156=605	+29
T4	United States	152-149-148-156=605	+29
6	Japan	148-153-151-158=610	+34
7	New Zealand	153-150-152-159=614*	+38
8	Sweden	149-153-148-166=616*	+40
9	Spain	156-159-156-154=625	+49
10	West Germany	167-156-152-157=632	+56
11	Switzerland	153-156-163-163=635	+59
12	Argentina	160-151-160-169=640	+64
13	Italy	157-160-163-164=644	+68
14	Fiji	183-181-175-198=737	+161

* Notes: After scoring 74 in the first round, Sweden's Kärstin Ehrnlund withdrew due to food poisoning and Sweden had to count both scores from the other two players during the remaining three rounds. New Zealand's Heater Ryan withdrew from the last round.

== Individual leaders ==
There was no official recognition for the lowest individual scores.

Place	Player	Country	Score	To par
1	Cathy Sherk	Canada	72-74-76-72=294	+6
T2	Beth Daniel	United States	75-71-74-78=298	+10
T2	Miki Oda	Japan	74-73-77-74=298	+10
T2	Jane Lock	Australia	73-72-75-78=298	+10
5	Marie-Laure de Lorenzi	France	74-77-77-73=301	+13
6	Julia Greenhalgh	(United Kingdom) Great Britain & Ireland	72-76-78-79=303	+15
T7	Edwina Kennedy	Australia	76-71-78-79=304	+16
T7	Catherine Lacoste de Prado	France	73-78-79-74=304	+16
T9	Mary Everard	(United Kingdom) Great Britain & Ireland	73-77-75-80=305	+17
T9	Cherry Kingham	New Zealand	75-74-74-82=305	+17
