= Alison Sheard =

South African professional golfer

Personal information
- Nationality: South Africa
- Born: 21 September 1951 (age 75) Durban, South Africa

Career
- Sport: Golf
- Turned professional: 1976
- Former tours: Ladies European Tour; LPGA Tour
- Professional wins: 4

Number of wins by tour
- Ladies European Tour: 4

Best results in LPGA major championships
- Women's PGA C'ship: T19: 1980
- U.S. Women's Open: T23: 1980
- du Maurier Classic: T10: 1981

Alison Sheard (born 21 September 1951) is a South African professional golfer who played on the Ladies European Tour (LET) and LPGA Tour. At Golf RSA events held during the 1970s, Sheard won the SA Women's Stroke Play five times and the SA Women's Amateur three times. As an amateur golfer, Sherard was second at the 1974 Espirito Santo Trophy with the South African team. At individual events, she was second at the 1976 British Ladies Amateur.

As a professional golfer, Sheard won four LET events between 1979 and 1985. At the 1979 Women's British Open, she was "the first overseas winner of the Championship". Sheard was the only Women's British Open champion from South Africa until Ashleigh Buhai's 2022 victory. In other events, Sheard was tied for 19th at the 1980 LPGA Championship, tied for 23rd at the 1980 U.S. Women's Open and 10th at the 1981 Peter Jackson Classic. During 2010, she joined the Southern Africa Golf Hall of Fame.

== Amateur career ==
Sheard was born on 21 September 1951 in Durban, South Africa. At South African golf events held by Golf RSA, Sheard won the SA Women's Stroke Play five times from 1974 to 1979. She also won the SA Women's Amateur back-to-back from 1976 to 1978. Outside of South Africa, Sheard was runner-up at the 1976 British Ladies Amateur. In team events, Sheard was part of the silver medal-winning South African team at the 1974 Espirito Santo Trophy.

== Professional career ==
In late 1976, Sheard became a professional golfer and played throughout Europe. Her first wins on the Ladies European Tour were at the Carlsberg and McEwans Welsh Classic tournaments in 1979. That year, Sheard was the leading money winner for the 1979 LET season. In 1980, Sheard joined the LPGA Tour. Between 1980 and 1983, her best performance at the LPGA was a seventh place tie at the 1983 West Virginia LPGA Classic. A few years later, Sheard won an additional LET tournament at the 1985 Spanish Open.

In major championships, Sheard won the 1979 Women's British Open before it was designated as a major championship in 2001. She was "the first overseas winner of the Championship". In later British Opens, she finished 9th at the 1982 edition and tied for 12th at the 1986 edition. She remained the only Women's British Open champion from South Africa until Ashleigh Buhai's victory in 2022. In Canada, she competed at the 1981 Peter Jackson Classic and was tied for 10th place with Jo Ann Washam. In the United States, Sheard was tied for 19th at the 1980 LPGA Championship and tied for 23rd at the 1980 U.S. Women's Open. Sheard was inducted into the Southern Africa Golf Hall of Fame in 2010.

== Ladies European Tour wins (4) ==
- 1979 (3) Carlsberg Championship – Sand Moor, Pretty Polly Women's British Open, McEwan's Welsh Classic
- 1985 (1) La Manga Spanish Open

Note: Sheard won the Women's British Open once before it was co-sanctioned by the LPGA Tour in 1994, and recognized as a major championship on the LPGA Tour in 2001

== Team appearances ==
Amateur

- Espirito Santo Trophy (representing South Africa): 1974, 1976
