= 1982 Espirito Santo Trophy =

Tournament information
- Dates: 8–11 October
- Location: Geneva, Switzerland; 46°12′N 6°09′E
- Course: Geneva Golf Club
- Organized by: World Amateur Golf Council
- Format: 72 holes stroke play

Statistics
- Par: 72
- Length: 6,070 yards (5,550 m)
- Field: 26 teams 78 players

Champion
- United States; Kathy Baker, Amy Benz, Juli Inkster
- 579 (+3)
- Location in Europe Location in Switzerland

The 1982 Espirito Santo Trophy took place 8–11 October at Geneva Golf Club in Geneva, Switzerland. It was the tenth women's golf World Amateur Team Championship for the Espirito Santo Trophy. The tournament was a 72-hole stroke play team event with 28 teams, each with up to three players. The best two scores for each round counted towards the team total.

The United States team won the Trophy, defending the title from two years ago and winning their eighth title, beating team New Zealand by seven strokes. New Zealand earned the silver medal while the combined team of Great Britain and Ireland took the bronze on third place another two strokes behind.

== Teams ==
26 teams contested the event. Each team had three players, except the team representing Portugal, which only had two.

Country	Players
Argentina	Amanda De Felizia, Susanna B. Garmendia, Maria E. Noguerol
Austria	Doris Derntl, Martina Franz, Alexandra Kotschwar
Belgium	Francoise Bonnelance, Isabelle De Clercq, Aline Van Der Haegen
Bermuda	Judithanne Astwood Outerbridge, Nathalie Davis, Ginette Spinucci
Brazil	Maria Alicia Gonzales, Isabel D. Lopes, Elisabeth Nickhorn
Chile	Marita Barrillas, Andrea Boettiger, Ana Maria Cambiaso
China	Chen Li-Ying, Cheng Mei-Chi, Chen Yueh-Ying
Denmark	Lise Eliasen, Merette Meiland, Anette Peitersen
Finland	Varpu Hakulinen, Arja Sipronen, Pirjo Sipronen
France	Elaine Berthet, Marie-Laure de Lorenzi, Cécilia Mourgue d'Algue
(United Kingdom) Great Britain & Ireland	Jane Connachan, Belle Robertson, Gillian Stewart
Iceland	Thordis Geirsdottir, Johanna Ingolfsdottir, Asgerdur Sverrisdottir
Indonesia	Ida Makasutji, Rien Tobing, Wani Tobing
Italy	Emanuelo Braito, Marina Buscani, Federica Dassù
Japan	Hiromi Kobayashi, Tashie Matsubara, Kimiko Yoshizawa
Mexico	Liz Chahin, Carolina Fernandez, Adriana Ramirez
Netherlands	Alice Janmaat, Lisebeth Koopman, Marischka Zegger
New Zealand	Janice Arnold, Liz Douglas, Brenda Rhodes
Norway	Reidun S. Dirdal, Anna Skanse Dönnestad, Cathrine Schröder
Portugal	Teresa Matta, Garca Medina
South Africa	Rae Hast, Laurette Maritz, Sheree Muirhead
Spain	Marta Figueras-Dotti, Carmen Maestre de Pellon, Cristina Marsans
Sweden	Hillewi Hagström, Liselotte Neumann, Liv Wollin
Switzerland	Marie Christine de Werra, Régine Lautens, Priscilla Staible
United States	Kathy Baker, Amy Benz, Juli Inkster
West Germany	Susana Knodler, Elizabeth Peter, Ines Umsen

== Results ==
Place	Country	Score	To par
1	United States	148-144-146-141=579	+3
2	New Zealand	155-149-149-143=596	+20
3	(United Kingdom) Great Britain & Ireland	155-144-144-155=598	+22
4	Sweden	156-141-152-151=600	+24
T5	Spain	154-146-147-154=601	+25
T5	Switzerland	153-147-150-151=601	+25
7	France	156-145-151-150=602	+26
8	Brazil	158-155-149-151=613	+37
9	China	160-152-153-149=614	+38
10	Italy	158-158-149-151=616	+40
11	Japan	156-155-153-154=618	+42
12	Denmark	165-152-153-153=623	+47
13	Belgium	164-151-156-156=627	+51
14	South Africa	163-158-154-153=628	+52
15	Netherlands	165-155-158-152=630	+54
T16	Argentina	161-159-157-162=639	+63
T16	West Germany	165-157-162-155=639	+63
18	Norway	165-164-153-159=641	+65
19	Mexico	169-156-163-158=646	+70
20	Chile	172-158-160-169=659	+83
21	Austria	161-175-161-171=668	+92
T22	Bermuda	180-177-171-174=698	+122
T22	Finland	175-174-175-174=698	+122
T22	Indonesia	181-168-173-176=698	+122
25	Iceland	184-190-186-184=744	+168
DQ	Portugal	182-170-183-DQ	

== Individual leaders ==
There was no official recognition for the lowest individual scores.

Place	Player	Country	Score	To par
1	Juli Inkster	United States	73-76-71-70=290	+2
2	Marta Figueras-Dotti	Spain	73-74-73-74=294	+6
3	Kathy Baker	United States	75-72-77-71=295	+7
T4	Belle Robertson	(United Kingdom) Great Britain & Ireland	77-74-72-75=298	+10
T4	Liv Wollin	Sweden	77-75-73-73=298	+10
T6	Liz Douglas	New Zealand	82-72-75-70=299	+11
T6	Régine Lautens	Switzerland	77-72-72-78=299	+11
8	Amy Benz	United States	79-72-75-74=300	+12
T9	Janice Arnold	New Zealand	77-77-74-73=301	+13
T9	Jane Connachan	(United Kingdom) Great Britain & Ireland	78-70-72-81=301	+13
