= Mary Budke =

American golfer (born 1953)

Mary Anne Budke (born November 16, 1953) is an American amateur golfer since the 1960s. Leading up to 2007, Budke won 13 events in Oregon and three held by the Pacific Northwest Golf Association. She holds the Oregon Amateur record with eight wins. At LPGA major events, she was tied for 17th during the 1973 U.S. Women's Open. Budke won the 1972 U.S. Women's Amateur and also won that year's Espirito Santo Trophy with the United States team. They won the 1974 Curtis Cup before Budke became their captain at the 2002 edition.

Outside of golf, Budke worked in the emergency room at hospitals throughout Oregon and California between the 1980s to 2010s. Budke received the 1972 Bill Hayward Amateur Athlete of the Year during the Oregon Sports Awards. She joined the Oregon Sports Hall of Fame and Women's Golf Coaches Association Players Hall of Fame during the 1990s. Other hall of fames include the Pacific Northwest Golf Association Hall of Fame in 2005 and the Pac-12 Conference Hall of Honor in 2023.

== Early life and education ==
Budke's was born in Salem, Oregon on November 16, 1953. She lived with her family in Dayton, Oregon. During her childhood, she played other sports before becoming a golfer. Budke played golf while attending Dayton High School. She won the OSAA Girls Golf Championship during 1971.

That year, Budke began her post-secondary education at Oregon State University. She studied business before changing to pre-medical. While there, she won the 1974 Association for Intercollegiate Athletics for Women championship. In 1976, Budke left Oregon State for the University of Oregon Health Sciences Center. From 1980 to 1984, she completed additional training at the St. Vincent Hospital and Medical Center and Los Angeles County-USC Medical Center.

== Career ==
=== Golf ===
From 1969 to 1971, Budke won the Oregon Junior Amateur consecutively. At the 1971 edition, Budke was "the first player ... to [win] three straight titles in the Junior Girls Division." During this time period, Budke was a two-time winner at both the Pacific Northwest Golf Association Junior Girls Championship and Women's Western Junior. At the U.S. Girls' Junior, she was a semifinalist twice during the 1970s.

Between 1971 and 1979, Budke was first at the Oregon Amateur eight times. During the 1971 Trans-Mississippi Women's Amateur, Budke reached the third round. In 1972, she played in the quarterfinals of the Women's Western Amateur and won the U.S. Women's Amateur. In LPGA major play, she was tied for 17th at the 1973 U.S. Women's Open. She won the 1972 Espirito Santo Trophy and the 1974 Curtis Cup with the United States teams.

During 1976, she was "the first woman to win the Oregon Amateur ... five times". Budke was also that year's PNGA Women's Amateur champion. Budke "[didn't] have any burning desire to play pro golf" during 1980. She reduced her golf appearances for most of the 1980s. At the California State Amateur Championship, Budke was second twice during the late 1980s. She was a semifinalist at the U.S. Women's Mid-Amateur in 1989.

She was the American captain at the 2002 Curtis Cup. Budke and her Oregonian teammates were tied for 15th at the 2005 United States Golf Association Women's State Team Championship. Additional first places were at the 2005 Oregon Mid-Amateur and the 2007 Oregon Senior Women's Stroke Play Championship. At the U.S. Senior Women's Amateur, Budke reached the round of 16 during 2005 and 2011. Leading up to the early 2020s, Budke remained as the record holder for most Oregon Women's Amateur wins.

=== Medicine and other positions ===
Before going to medical school, Budke was working in McMinnville, Oregon during 1976. She "[was] in the golf shop and in the lounge as a bartender at Michelbook County Club". In between her studies, Budke worked in geriatrics for the Oregon State Hospital during 1982.

While in California during 1984, she moved to the Granada Hills Hospital and began working in the emergency room. When she returned to Oregon, Budke worked for Good Samaritan Hospital in 1995. She went to Sacred Heart Medical Center the following year. She remained there as part of their emergency department until the early 2010s.

== Honors ==
As part of the Oregon Sports Awards, Budke won the 1972 Bill Hayward Amateur Athlete of the Year. She became a member of the Oregon Sports Hall of Fame in 1991 and the Oregon State University Athletics Hall of Fame in 1992. During 1996, Budke entered the Women's Golf Coaches Association Players Hall of Fame. She joined the Pacific Northwest Golf Association Hall of Fame in 2005 and the Pac-12 Conference Hall of Honor during 2023.
