= 1972 Espirito Santo Trophy =

Tournament information
- Dates: 11–14 October
- Location: Buenos Aires, Argentina; 34.486°S 58.533°W
- Course: Hindu Country Club
- Organized by: World Amateur Golf Council
- Format: 72 holes stroke play

Statistics
- Par: 72
- Length: 6,117 yards (5,593 m)
- Field: 20 teams 60 players

Champion
- United States; Jane Bastanchury Booth, Laura Baugh, Mary Anne Budke
- 583 (+7)
- Location in South America Location in Argentina Location in Buenos Aires Province

The 1972 Espirito Santo Trophy took place 11–14 October at Hindu Country Club in Buenos Aires, Argentina. It was the fifth women's golf World Amateur Team Championship for the Espirito Santo Trophy. The tournament was a 72-hole stroke play team event with 20 three-woman teams. The best two scores for each round counted towards the team total.

The United States won the Trophy, defending their title from two years ago and winning their four consecutive title, beating France by four strokes. France took the silver medal while Sweden, seven strokes further behind, for the first time on the podium in the championship, took the bronze.

== Teams ==
20 teams contested the event. Each team had three players.

Country	Players
Argentina	Maria Julia Caserta de Aftalion, Silvia Bertolaccini, Beatriz Rossello
Australia	Heather Bleeck, Gayle Gannon, Sandra McCaw
Belgium	Corinne Reybroeck, Louise van den Berghe, Marie Anne Reybroeck
Brazil	Yolanda Figueiredo, Emma Grant, Emy Nomura
Canada	Gayle Hitchens Borthwick, Marilyn Palmer, Marlene Stewart Streit
Chile	Ximena Bernales, Patricia de Fernandez, Marina Raab
Colombia	Beatriz de Gaviria, Elisa Pardo, Gloria de Pardo
France	Claudine Cros Rubin, Anne Marie Palli, Brigitte Varangot
(United Kingdom) Great Britain & Ireland	Mary Everard, Belle Robertson, Mickey Walker
Italy	Isa Goldschmidt Bevione, Bianca Martini Crotti, Marina Ragher
Japan	Takako Kiyomoto, Kazuko Kobayashi, Michiko Tachibana
Netherlands	Alice Janmaat, Annie M. Sandbach, Marischka Swane
New Zealand	Mrs. S.R.S. Bannan, Susan Hamilton, Marilyn Smith
Peru	Cecilia Barreda, Jennifer Bayly, Juana de Nari
South Africa	Judy Angel, Cheran Gerber, Jenny Nellmapius
Spain	Elena Corominas, Emma Villacieros de García-Ogara, Cristina Marsans
Sweden	Birgit Forsman, Christina Westerberg, Liv Wollin
United States	Jane Bastachury Booth, Laura Baugh, Mary Anne Budke
Uruguay	Gladys Cooper De Bragard, Carmen De Olelsner, Sheila Rumassa
West Germany	Marietta Gutermann, Marion Peterson, Katherina Trebitsch

== Results ==
Place	Country	Score	To par
1st place, gold medalist(s)	United States	140-145-153-145=583	+7
2nd place, silver medalist(s)	France	156-147-139-145=587	+11
3rd place, bronze medalist(s)	Sweden	148-150-147-149=594	+18
4	Australia	151-149-151-150=601	+25
5	Canada	145-157-150-150=602	+26
5	(United Kingdom) Great Britain & Ireland	151-148-154-149=602	+26
5	Japan	147-152-150-153=602	+26
8	Argentina	151-147-154-153=605	+29
9	Spain	151-154-152-153=610	+34
10	Italy	157-155-149-151=612	+36
11	New Zealand	158-157-152-154=621	+45
12	West Germany	152-156-156-158=622	+46
13	Netherlands	154-157-156-157=624	+48
14	Belgium	159-150-154-165=628	+52
15	South Africa	165-152-160-161=638	+62
16	Chile	161-163-163-156=643	+67
17	Brazil	161-165-158-169=653	+77
18	Peru	166-165-165-169=665	+89
19	Colombia	166-164-168-168=666	+90
20	Uruguay	176-169-168-167=680	+104

== Individual leaders ==
There was no official recognition for the lowest individual scores.

Place	Player	Country	Score	To par
1	Jane Bastachury Booth	United States	68-73-77-73=291	+3
2	Claudine Cros Rubin	France	80-73-68-71=292	+4
2	Marlene Stewart Streit	Canada	68-77-73-74=292	+4
T4	Laura Baugh	United States	72-73-77-72=294	+6
T4	Takako Kiyomoto	Japan	71-74-73-76=294	+6
T4	Liv Wollin	Sweden	73-71-74-76=294	+6
7	Brigitte Varangot	France	76-74-71-76=297	+9
T8	Mary Anne Budke	United States	78-72-76-74=300	+12
T8	Gayle Gannon	Australia	74-73-74-79=300	+12
T8	Beatriz Rosello	Argentina	73-73-76-78=300	+12
T8	Christina Westerberg	Sweden	76-79-73-73=300	+12
