= Federica Dassù =

Italian professional golfer

Personal information
- Nationality: Italy
- Born: 17 February 1957 (age 69) Milan, Italy

Career
- Sport: Golf
- Turned professional: 1983
- Former tour: Ladies European Tour
- Professional wins: 6

Number of wins by tour
- Ladies European Tour: 6

Best results in LPGA major championships
- Chevron Championship: DNP
- Women's PGA C'ship: DNP
- U.S. Women's Open: DNP
- Women's British Open: T47: 2002
- Evian Championship: DNP

Federica Dassù (born 17 February 1957) is an Italian professional golfer.

== Career ==
Dassù was born in Milan. She turned professional in 1983 and joined the Women Professional Golfers' European Tour (now the Ladies European Tour). She won her last Ladies European Tour title, the 2003 Open de España Femenino at an age of 44, the oldest LET winner at the time, and announced her retirement at the end of the season. The following year Dassù caddied for Diana Luna as she won the Tenerife Ladies Open. In addition to her wins, she was runner-up at the 1995 Ladies European Masters and the 1999 Royal Marie-Claire Open.

== Professional wins (6) ==
=== Ladies European Tour wins (6) ===
- 1984 White Horse Whisky Challenge
- 1985 Bowring Birmingham Ladies Classic
- 1991 Woolmark Ladies' Matchplay
- 1993 Ford Ladies Classic
- 1996 Compaq Open
- 2003 Open de España Femenino

== Team appearances ==
Amateur

- European Lady Junior's Team Championship (representing Italy): 1972 (winners), 1973, 1974, 1976 (winners), 1977
- European Ladies' Team Championship (representing Italy): 1973, 1981
- Espirito Santo Trophy (representing Italy): 1974, 1976, 1980, 1982
- Vagliano Trophy (representing the Continent of Europe): 1973, 1981 (winners)
