= 1976 Espirito Santo Trophy =

Tournament information
- Dates: 6–9 October
- Location: Vilamoura, Algarve, Portugal; 37°4′40″N 8°6′55″W
- Course: Vilamoura Golf Club (Vilamoura Old Course)
- Organized by: World Amateur Golf Council
- Format: 72 holes stroke play

Statistics
- Par: 73
- Length: 6,181 yards (5,652 m)
- Field: 25 teams 74 players

Champion
- United States; Donna Horton, Nancy Lopez, Debbie Massey
- 605 (+21)
- Location in Europe Location i Portugal

The 1976 Espirito Santo Trophy took place 6–9 October at Vilamoura Golf Club in, Vilamoura, Algarve, Portugal. It was the seventh women's golf World Amateur Team Championship for the Espirito Santo Trophy. The tournament was a 72-hole stroke play team event with 25 teams, each with up to three players. The best two scores for each round counted towards the team total.

The United States team won the Trophy, defending their title from two years ago and winning their sixth consecutive title, beating team France by 17 strokes. France took the silver medal and Brazil, on the podium for the first time, took the bronze.

== Teams ==
25 teams contested the event. Each team had three players, except Sri Lanka, who only had two.

| Country | Players |
|---|---|
| Argentina | Maria Julia Caserta de Aftalion, Amanda de Felicia, Beatriz Rossello |
| Australia | Jane Lock, Sandra McCaw, Karen Permezel |
| Belgium | Maguy Brose, Marianne Toussaint, Francoise De Wagheneire |
| Brazil | Maria Alice Gonzalez, Elisabeth Noronha, Laura M. dos Santos |
| Canada | Betty Stanhope-Cole, Marylin Palmer, Dale Shaw |
| Chile | Patriciua Fernandez, Beatriz Steeger, Maria Pia Valdez |
| China | Mei-Chin Chen, Ming-Ching Huang, Yu-Hsia Tai |
| Denmark | Annettte Hagdrup, Marete Meiland, Tina Pors |
| Dominican Republic | Silivia Corrie, Susan Fellow, Jacqueline M. de Jesus |
| France | Catherine Lacoste de Prado, Anne Marie Palli, Marie-Christine Ubald-Bocquet |
| (United Kingdom) Great Britain & Ireland | Mary McKenna, Catherine Panton, Jenny Lee Smith |
| Italy | Federica Dassù, Isa Goldschmidt Bevione, Marina Ragher |
| Jamaica | Pauline Laman, Dorothy Mahfood, Suanne Rebhan |
| Japan | Haruko Ishii, Yuniki Kanoh, Machiko Yamada |
| Mexico | Luz de Lourdes Fernandez, Maria Luisa Martinez, Fela Chaves de Subirats |
| Netherlands | Alice Janmaat, Nicole Spitz, Marischka Zegger-Swane |
| Norway | Lilly Gulliksen, Vivi Horn Marstrand, Mette Rinde Reuss |
| Portugal | Teresa Mata, Graca Medina, Veronica Oliveira e Silva |
| Rhodesia | Jean Freeman, Anne Esson, Joan Walker |
| South Africa | Jenny Bruce, Cheran Gerber, Alison Sheard |
| Spain | Elena Corminas, Carmen Maestre de Pellon, Cristina Marsans |
| Sri Lanka | Tiru Fernando, Mrs W.P. Fernando |
| Sweden | Hillewi Hagström, Pia Nilsson, Liv Wollin |
| Switzerland | Carole Charbonnier, Verena Salvisberg, Marie Christine de Werra |
| United States | Donna Horton, Nancy Lopez, Debbie Massey |

== Results ==
| Place | Country | Score | To par |
|---|---|---|---|
| 1st place, gold medalist(s) | United States | 152-152-147-154=605 | +21 |
| 2nd place, silver medalist(s) | France | 154-157-149-162=622 | +38 |
| 3rd place, bronze medalist(s) | Brazil | 160-160-152-154=626 | +42 |
| 4 | Italy | 157-159-157-162=635 | +51 |
| T5 | Australia | 160-160-157-159=636 | +52 |
| T5 | Canada | 161-156-157-162=636 | +52 |
| 7 | China | 157-161-157-163=638 | +54 |
| T8 | South Africa | 159-157-160-163=639 | +55 |
| T8 | Spain | 162-160-157-160=639 | +55 |
| T10 | Sweden | 165-158-159-159=641 | +57 |
| T10 | West Germany | 164-160-155-162=641 | +57 |
| 12 | Japan | 158-163-166-156=643 | +59 |
| 13 | (United Kingdom) Great Britain & Ireland | 164-162-162-157=645 | +61 |
| 14 | Argentina | 160-170-159-160=649 | +65 |
| 15 | Switzerland | 166-171-166-160=663 | +79 |
| 16 | Netherlands | 166-171-165-167=669 | +85 |
| 17 | Belgium | 172-171-166-165=674 | +90 |
| 18 | Chile | 168-170-171-168=677 | +93 |
| T19 | Denmark | 175-169-169-172=685 | +101 |
| T19 | Mexico | 167-171-175-172=685 | +101 |
| T21 | Norway | 172-177-175-177=701 | +117 |
| T21 | Sri Lanka | 176-184-174-167=701 | +117 |
| 23 | Rhodesia | 177-175-175-175=702 | +118 |
| 24 | Portugal | 193-199-185-185=762 | +178 |
| 25 | Dominican Republic | 208-189-183-197=777 | +193 |

== Individual leaders ==
There was no official recognition for the lowest individual scores.

| Place | Player | Country | Score | To par |
|---|---|---|---|---|
| 1 | Nancy Lopez | United States | 72-75-73-77=297 | +5 |
| 2 | Catherine Lacoste de Prado | France | 76-77-75-79=307 | +15 |
| T3 | Debbie Massey | United States | 80-77-74-78=309 | +23 |
| T3 | Liv Wollin | Sweden | 79-79-77-74=309 | +25 |
| T5 | Maria Alice Gonzalez | Brazil | 81-76-80-75=312 | +28 |
| T5 | Donna Horton | United States | 81-77-77-77=312 | +28 |
| T7 | Carmen Maestre de Pellon | Spain | 78-78-77-81=314 | +30 |
| T7 | Elisabeth Noronha | Brazil | 79-84-72-79=314 | +30 |
| 9 | Anne Marie Palli | France | 78-80-74-83=315 | +31 |
| 10 | Federica Dassù | Italy | 80-77-78-81=316 | +32 |
