= European Lady Junior's Team Championship =

Amateur golf tournament

The European Lady Junior's Team Championship was a European amateur team golf championship for women under 22 organized by the European Golf Association. The inaugural event was held in 1968. It was played every year until 1984, then every second year. It was discontinued in 2006.

== Results ==
Year	Venue	Location	Gold	Silver	Bronze	Ref
2006	GC de Pan	Netherlands	Sweden Py Bengtsson; Mikaela Bäckstedt; Karin Kinnerud; Pernilla Lindberg; Anna Nordqvist; Caroline Westrup	Spain Azahara Muñoz; Aruka Felgueroso; María Hernández	England Jodi Ewart; Anna Scott; Florentyna Parker; Felicity Johnson	
2004	Royal Cinque Ports	England	Spain María Hernández; Elisa Serramia; Carlota Ciganda; Carmen Alonso; Lucia Mar; Beatriz Recari	Wales Stephanie Evans; Sarah Jones; Breanne Loucks; Lydia Hall; Kate Phillips; Samantha Birks	Sweden Louise Stahle; Sofie Andersson; Karin Sjödin; Josephine Svenningsson; Karin Kinnerud; Maria Ringdal	
2002	Moscow G&CC	Russia	Spain Emma Cabrera-Bello; Carmen Alonso; Elisa Serramia; Nuria Clau Pintado; Tania Elósegui Mayor; Ana Sanso-Rubert Gonzales	Germany Laura Soellner; Denise Simon; Kerstin Honisch; Martina Eberl; Stephanie Doring; Bettina Havert	Sweden Sofie Andersson; Karin Sjödin; Emelie Svenningsson; Eva Bjärvall; Karin Börjeskog; Golda Johansson	
2000	Castelconturbia GC	Italy	Italy Barbara Vinello	England	France	
1998	Oslo GC	Norway	Spain Marta Prieto	Italy	Sweden Maria Bodén; Kristina Engström; Marie Hedberg; Anna Jönsson; Jessica Krantz; Helena Svensson	
1996	Nairn	Scotland	Spain Alexandra Armas; Marta Prieto	France V. Amandine; Joanne-Marie Busuttil; Karine Icher; Caroline Laurens; Marine Monnet; A. Vincent	Sweden Cecilia Afzelius-Alm; Anna Becker; Ulrika Jidflo; Jessica Lindbergh; Anna Lindblom; Helena Ohlsson	
1994	Gutenhof GC	Austria	Sweden Anna Berg; Linda Ericsson; Maria Hjorth; Mia Löjdahl; Helene Ohlsson; Charlotta Sörenstam	France Joanne-Marie Busuttil; Stephanie Dallongeville; Ludivine Kreutz; Kristel Mourge d'Algue; Cathy Schmitt; Amelie Tournant	Spain Alexandra Armas; Sara Beautell; Ana Larraneta; Maria José Pons; Ana Belen Sanchez; Vanessa Vignali	
1992	Golf de Saint-Nom-la-Bretèche	France	Spain Alexandra Armas; Estefania Knuth; Laura Navarro; Maria Jose Pons; Vanessa Vignali	Sweden Maria Brink; Linda Ericsson; Åsa Gottmo; Maria Hjorth; Ulrika Johansson; Charlotta Sörenstam	France	
1990	Shannon GC	Ireland	Sweden Mia Bergman; Maria Bertilsköld; Charlotte Eliasson; Åsa Gottmo; Carin Koch; Annika Sörenstam	England Rachael Bolas; Helen Dobson; Laura Fairclough; Alison Johns; Alison MacDonald	Germany Muriel Ahlberg; Franca Fehlauer; Martina Fischer; Luise Gehlen; Janou Kammann; Veronica Kolbe	
1988	Waterloo GC	Belgium	England Helen Dobson; Laura Fairclough; Alison Johns; S. Robinson; Susan Shapcott; N. Way	Scotland Elaine Farquharson; Karen Fitzgerald; Catriona Lambert; Katrina Milne; Alison Rose	Sweden Katarina Andersson; Jennifer Allmark; Carin Koch; Madeleine Kvist; Katarina Michols; Pernilla Sterner	
1986	Falkenstein GC	Germany	England Trish Johnson; Susan Moorcraft; Susan Shapcott; Julie Hall; Julie Wade	Scotland Kathryn Imrie; Lindsey Anderson; Julie Forbes; Donna Thomson; Elaine Farquharson; T. Craik	Spain Tania Abitbol; Mari Carmen Navarro; Gemma Reyne; Esther Tamarit; Sonia Wunch	
1984	El Saler	Spain	Sweden Helen Alfredsson; Eva Dahllöf; Sofia Grönberg; Camilla Karlsson; Liselotte Neumann; Anna Oxenstierna	Italy Bevilacqua; Bertotto; Binaghi; Girardi; Pagani; Caterina Quintarelli	England Julie Brown; Laura Davies; Penny Grice; Julie Hall; Trish Johnson Percival	
1983	Rosendaelsche	Netherlands	England Julie Brown; Laura Davies; Gallagher; Penny Grice; Rhodes	Sweden Helen Alfredsson; Eva Dahllöf; Camilla Karlsson; Liselotte Neumann; Anna Oxenstierna; Jessica Posener	Spain Camino Alonso; Macarena Campomanes; Mari Carmen Navarro; Lourdes Barbieto; Macarena Tey; Sonia Wunch	
1982	Royal Drottningholm	Sweden	England Julie Brown; Kitrina Douglas; Julia Hill; Penny Grice; Janet Soulsby; Claire Waite	Sweden Helen Alfredsson; Eva Dahllöf; Signe Lindefeldt; Liselotte Neumann; Anna Oxenstierna; Jessica Posener	Spain Macarena Campomanes; María Castillo; María Orueta; Macarena Tey; Sonia Wunch	
1981	Wentworth	England	Sweden Helen Alfredsson; Eva Dahllöf; Camilla Karlsson; Signe Lindefeldt; Anna Oxenstierna; Jessica Posener	Wales Karen Davies; W. Griffith; Mandy Rawlings; G. Rees; S. Rowlands	Germany Silke Greve; S. Haubensak; Susanne Knödler; Astrid Peter; Patricia Peter; Ines Umsen	
1980	Vienna	Austria	Scotland	Denmark Anette Peitersen; Tina Pors; Lotta Schmidt; Lang-Nielsen; Mette Brandt-Andersen	France Lapaire; Marie-Laure de Lorenzi; Laurance Schmidlin; Corine Soules	
1979	Fontainebleau GC	France	France Eliane Berthét; Carole Bromet; Marie-Laure de Lorenzi; Laurance Schmidlin; Corine Soules	Sweden Gisela Linnér; Charlotte Montgomery; Helena Mörse; Pia Nilsson; Cecilia Tillström; Marie Wennersten	England A. Norman	
1978	Is Molas	Italy	Sweden Eva Emilsson; Eva Cedervall; Gisela Linnér; Charlotte Montgomery; Pia Nilsson; Marie Wennersten	France Eliane Berthét; Carole Bromet; Labesse; Marie-Laure de Lorenzi; Zimmern	Spain Marta Figueras-Dotti	
1977	Grand-Ducal	Luxembourg	Spain Marta Figueras-Dotti; Cristina M. de Murguía; Miriam Álvarez-Guerra de Velasco; Ana Vilella	Italy Federica Dassù; Moavero; Pischiutta; Pia Tolomei; Rindi	Germany Ursula Beer; Sabine Blecher; Cathrin Westendarp; Stefanie Eckrodt; Nicolle Eicke; Christine Felixmüller	
1976	Rungsted GC	Denmark	Italy Christillin; Federica Dassù; Pischiutta; Pia Tolomei; Rindi	Spain Otilia Bonny; Marta Figueras-Dotti; Cristina M. de Murguía; Miriam Álvarez-Guerra de Velasco	Switzerland	
1975	Waterloo GC	Belgium	Spain Elena Corominas; Olga Corpas; Marta Figueras-Dotti; Martinez; Cristina M. de Murguía; Ana Vilella	France Carole Bromet; Natalie Jeanson; Sabine Lamidey; Marie-Laure de Lorenzi; Anne Marie Palli	Switzerland	
1974	Rya GC	Sweden	France Natalie Jeanson; Sabine Lamidey; A. Robert Lanzeraq; Leveque; Anne Marie Palli; Zimmern	Spain Otilia Bonny; Carroggio; Elena Corominas; Olga Corpus; Marta Figueras-Dotti	Sweden Monica Andersson; Mia Borgström; Eva Cedervall; Hillevi Hagström; Ulla Lindskog; Anna Skanse Dönnestad; Lotta Skeppstedt	
1973	El Prat	Spain	France Natalie Jeanson; Veronique Magnen; Sabine Lamidey; Anne Marie Palli; A. Robert	Spain Otilia Bonny; Carroggio; Elena Corominas; Marta Figueras-Dotti; Ana Vilella	Sweden Monica Andersson; Eva Cedervall; Hillevi Hagström; Carina Lindblad; Lena Rieman; Anna Skanse Dönnestad; Marie Österberg	
1972	Münich GC	Germany	Italy Eva Ragher; Maria Segafredo; Federica Dassù; M. Marazza; A.R. Bria Berter	Sweden Monica Andersson; Hillevi Hagström; Viveca Hoff; Carina Lindblad; Nailil Skoog; Anna Skanse Dönnestad	Spain	
1971	Lido GC	Italy	France Ch. Collenot; M.L. Leps; Veronique Magnen; M.C. Valats; Anne Marie Palli; A. Robert	Spain	Sweden Monica Andersson; Viveca Hoff; Nailil Skoog; Ulla Lindskog; Lena Rieman; Christina Westerberg	
1970	Golf de Saint-Cloud	France	France Ch. Collenot; M.L. Leps; Veronique Magnen; A. Newman; Anne Marie Palli; A. Robert	Belgium	Sweden Monica Andersson; Anna Skanse Dönnestad; Nailil Skoog; Carina Lindblad; Monica Strandberg; Christina Westerberg	
1969	Geneva GC	Switzerland	Netherlands Joyce de Witt Puyt; Marischka Swane; P. Grosch; N. de Boer; Y. Lydsman	Sweden Monica Andersson; Kristina Kronberg; Nailil Skoog; Kristina Stjernberg; Monica Strandberg; Christina Westerberg	Belgium Corinne Reybroeck	
1968	Toxandria GC	Netherlands	Belgium	Netherlands	France	

== Results summary ==
Team	Gold	Silver	Bronze	Total
Spain	7	5	6	18
Sweden	6	6	9	21
France	5	4	4	13
England	4	2	3	9
Italy	3	3	–	6
Scotland	1	2	–	3
Belgium	1	1	1	2
Netherlands	1	1	–	2
Wales	–	2	–	2
Denmark	–	1	–	1
Germany	–	1	3	4
Switzerland	–	–	2	2
Total	28	28	28	

== See also ==
- European Girls' Team Championship – amateur team golf championship for women up to 18 organized by the European Golf Association
- European Ladies' Team Championship – amateur team golf championship for women organized by the European Golf Association
- European Youths' Team Championship – discontinued amateur team golf championship for women up to 21 organized by the European Golf Association played 1968-2006
