= 1975 European Ladies' Team Championship =

Golf competition

Tournament information
- Dates: 3–6 July 1975
- Location: Paris, France; 48.852°N 2.191°E
- Course: Golf de Saint-Cloud
- Organized by: European Golf Association
- Format: 18 holes stroke play Knock-out match-play

Statistics
- Par: 73
- Field: 13 teams circa 65 players

Champion
- France; Martine Cochet, Odile Garaialde, Martine Giraud, Catherine Lacoste de Prado, Anne Marie Palli, Marie-Christine Ubald-Bocquet
- Qualification round: 308 (+16); Final match 4 1/2–2 1/2

Location map
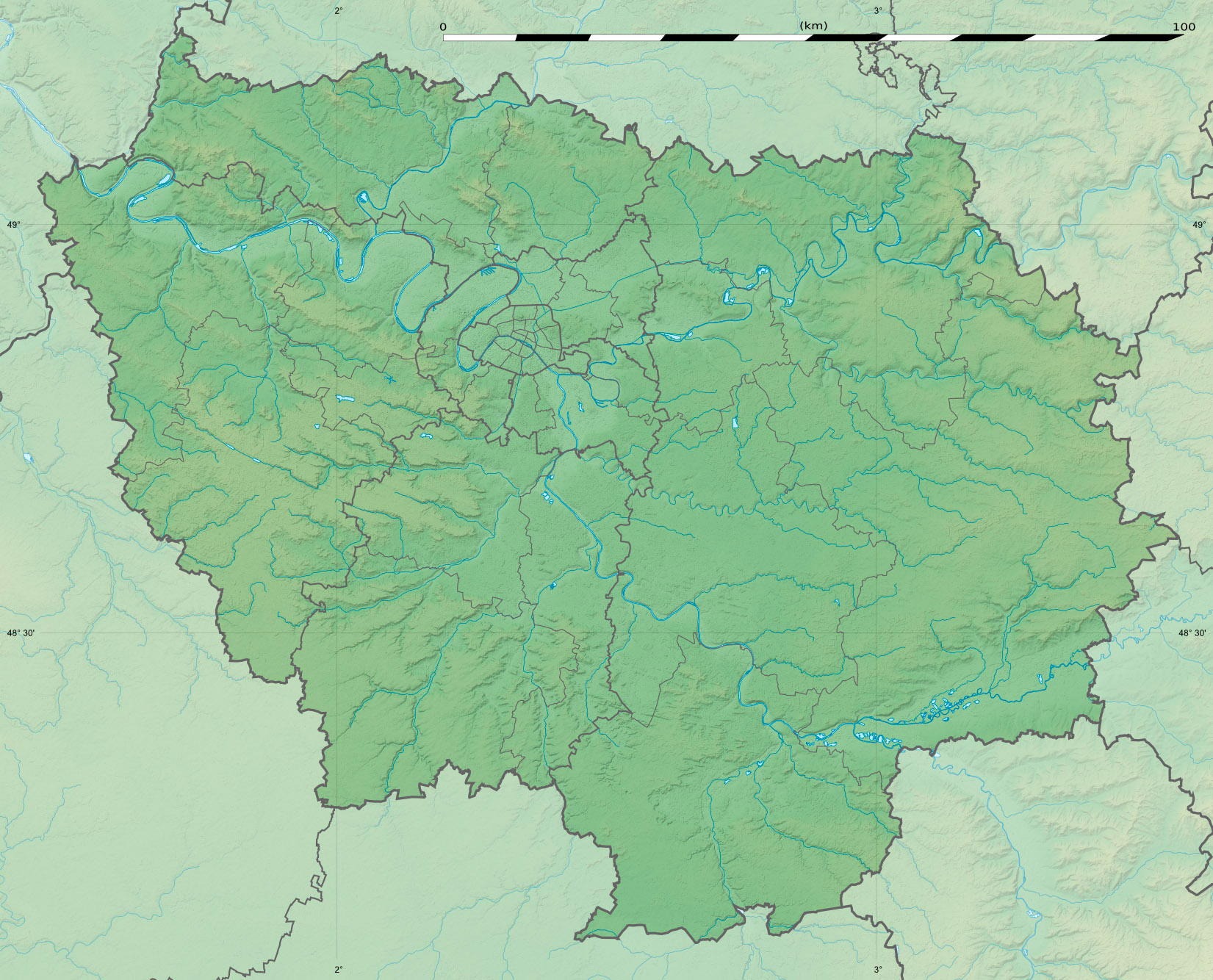
- Location in Europe Location in France Location in Île-de-France

The 1975 European Ladies' Team Championship took place 3–6 July at Golf de Saint-Cloud in Paris, France. It was the ninth women's golf amateur European Ladies' Team Championship.

== Venue ==
The hosting club had previously hosted the men's professional Open de France ten times. It purchased the estate, situated in Garches, 12 kilometres west of the city center of Paris, in 1911. Harry Colt designed the first 18-hole course, the Green Course, inaugurated in 1913. A second 18-hole course, the Yellow Course, was completed in 1930.

== Format ==
All participating teams played one qualification round of stroke-play with up to five players, counted the four best scores for each team.

The six best teams formed flight A, in knock-out match-play over the next three days. The teams were seeded based on their positions after the stroke-play. The teams placed first and second were directly qualified for the semi-finals. The team placed third was drawn to play the quarter-final against the team placed sixth and the teams placed fourth and fifth met each other. In each match between two nation teams, two 18-hole foursome games and five 18-hole single games were played. Teams were allowed to switch players during the team matches, selecting other players in to the afternoon single games after the morning foursome games. Games all square after 18 holes were declared halved, if the team match was already decided.

The four teams placed 7–10 in the qualification stroke-play formed Flight B and the three teams placed 11–13 formed Flight C, to play similar knock-out play to decide their final positions.

== Teams ==
13 nation teams contested the event. It was the same number of teams and the same nations represented as at the previous championship two years earlier. Each team consisted of a minimum of four players.

Players in the leading teams

Country	Players
England	Ann Irvin, Anne Stant, Bridget Jackson, Julia Greenhalgh, Beverly Huke, Lynne Harrold, Jenny Lee Smith
France	Martine Cochet, Odile Semelaigne-Garaïalde, Martine Gajan-Giraud, Catherine Lacoste de Prado, Anne Marie Palli, Marie-Christine Ubald-Bocquet
Ireland	Elaine Bradshaw, Mary Gorry, Mary MacKenna, Claire Nesbitt Robinson, Vivian Singleton
Scotland	Suzanne Cadden, Lesley Hope, Sandra Needham, Joan Smith, Maureen Walker, Muriel Thomson
Spain	Ana Monfort de Albox, Elena Corominas, Marta Figueras-Dotti, Emma Villacieros de García-Ogara, Cristina Marsans, Carmen Maestre de Pellon
Sweden	Monica Andersson, Birgit Forsman, Hillevi Hagström, Ulla Lindskog, Anna Skanse Dönnestad, Liv Wollin
Switzerland	D. Caillat, Carole Charbonnier, M. Günthard, S. Kessler, Marie Christine de Werra
Wales	Audrey Briggs, Ann Johnson, Pam Light Chugg, Vicki Rawlings, Tegwen Perkins, Pamela Whitley Valentine
West Germany	Marietta Gütermann, Susanne Schultz, Jeannette Weghmann, Barbara Böhm, Marion Thannhäuser

Other participating teams

Country
Belgium
Denmark
Italy
Netherlands

== Winners ==
Team Ireland, a combined team from Northern Ireland and the Republic of Ireland, won the opening 18-hole competition, with a score of 10 over par 302, one stroke ahead of team Scotland. Defending champions England did not make it to the quarter-finals, finishing eight.

Individual leaders in the opening 18-hole stroke-play qualifying competition was Sandra Needham, England, and Liv Wollin, Sweden, each with a score of 3-under-par 70, two shots ahead of Catherine Lacoste de Prado, France. Wollin previously led the individual competition in the 1963 championship 12 years earlier and came back in 1975 after being absent in 1973 due to the birth of her child. Lacoste made her second appearance in the championship, being absent in 1965 and 1967 due to participation in the U.S. Women's Open, which she won in 1967. Wollin and Lacoste came to meet in the singles in the quarter-final between Sweden and France. Wollin won the game 3 and 2, but, champions to be, France won the match 4–3.

Host nation France advanced to the final, beat team Spain 4 1/2–2 1/2 and earned their fourth title. Team Ireland, for the first time on the podium, beat Scotland 4–3 in the third place match.

== Results ==
Qualification round

Team standings

Place	Country	Score	To par
1	Ireland	302	+10
2	Scotland	303	+11
T3	Spain *	304	+12
T3	Sweden	304	+12
5	France	308	+16
6	Wales	309	+17
T7	Switzerland *	311	+19
T7	England	311	+19
9	Italy	316	+24
10	West Germany	318	+26
11	Netherlands	320	+28
T12	Belgium *	324	+32
T12	Denmark	324	+32

* Note: In the event of a tie the order was determined by the better non-counting score.

Individual leaders

Place	Player	Country	Score	To par
T1	Sandra Needham	Scotland	70	−3
T1	Liv Wollin	Sweden	70	−3
3	Catherine Lacoste de Prado	France	72	−1
4	Mary MacKenna	Ireland	73	E
T5	Ana Monfort de Albox	Spain	74	+1
T5	Ann Johnson	Wales	74	+1
T7	Mary Gorry	Ireland	75	+2
T7	Ann Irvin	England	75	+2

Note: There was no official award for the lowest individual score.

Flight A

Bracket

Quarter finals
France	4
Sweden	3
Spain	6
Wales	1

Semi finals
France	4
Ireland	3
Spain	4
Scotland	3

Final
France	4.5
Spain	2.5
Bronze match
Ireland	4
Scotland	3

Match for 5th place
Wales	4
Sweden	3

−

Final games

France	Spain
4.5	2.5
C. Lacoste / A.M. Palli	C. Marsans / A. Monfort de Albox 1 hole
M. Gajan-Giraud / O. Semelaigne-Garaïalde 4 & 2	E. Villacieros de García-Ogara / C. Maestre de Pellon
Catherine Lacoste 4 & 3	Ana Monfort de Albox
Anne Marie Palli 3 & 2	Elena Corominas
Martine Gajan-Giraud 2 & 1	Cristina Marsans
Odile Semelaigne-Garaïalde	Carmen Maestre de Pellon 4 & 2
Martine Couchet AS *	Emma Villacieros de García-Ogara AS *

* Note: Game declared halved, since team match already decided.

Final standings

Place	Country
1st place, gold medalist(s)	France
2nd place, silver medalist(s)	Spain
3rd place, bronze medalist(s)	Ireland
4	Scotland
5	Wales
6	Sweden
7	Italy
8	England
9	West Germany
10	Switzerland
11	Netherlands
12	Belgium
13	Denmark

== See also ==
- Espirito Santo Trophy – biennial world amateur team golf championship for women organized by the International Golf Federation.
- European Amateur Team Championship – European amateur team golf championship for men organised by the European Golf Association.
