= 1974 Espirito Santo Trophy =

Tournament information
- Dates: 22–25 October
- Location: Cajuiles, La Romana Province, Dominican Republic; 18.415°N 68.937°W
- Course: Campo de Golf
- Organized by: World Amateur Golf Council
- Format: 72 holes stroke play

Statistics
- Par: 74
- Length: 6,117 yards (5,593 m)
- Field: 22 teams 65 players

Champion
- United States; Cindy Hill, Debbie Massey, Carol Semple
- 620 (+28)
- Location in the Caribbean Location in the Dominican Republic

The 1974 Espirito Santo Trophy took place 22–25 October at Campo de Golf in Cajuiles, La Romana Province, Dominican Republic. It was the sixth women's golf World Amateur Team Championship for the Espirito Santo Trophy. The tournament was a 72-hole stroke play team event with 22 teams, each with up to three players. The best two scores for each round counted towards the team total.

The United States team won the Trophy, defending their title from two years ago and winning their fifth consecutive title, beating team Great Britain & Ireland and team South Africa by 16 strokes. Great Britain & Ireland and South Africa tied for the silver medal.

The Trophy was originally planned to be played in Malaysia, but the World Amateur Golf Council moved the event as Malaysian immigration laws would have seen the South African delegation refused entry into the country.

== Teams ==
22 teams contested the event. Each team had three players, except Chile who only had two.

Country	Players
Argentina	Maria Julia Caserta de Aftalion, Beatriz Rossello, Maria Teran
Australia	Liz Cavill Blackmore, Jane Lock, Marea Hickey Parsons
Belgium	Corinne Reybroeck, Louise van den Berghe, Francoise Wagheneire
Bermuda	Phillis Ahern, Joan Foulger, Glenda Todd
Brazil	Ingrid Buchi, Maria Alice Gonzalez, Elisabeth Noronha
Canada	Betty Stanhope-Cole, Marylin Palmer, Susan Wickware
Chile	Maria Pia Aguirre, Ximena Bernales
Dominican Republic	Silivia Corrie, Maria de la Guardia, Jacqueline M. de Jesus
France	Martine Giraud, Catherine Lacoste de Prado, Brigitte Varangot
(United Kingdom) Great Britain & Ireland	Julia Greenhalgh, Mary McKenna, Tegwen Perkins
Italy	Federica Dassù, Eva Ragher, Marina Ragher
Jamaica	Pauline Laman, Dorothy Mahfood, Suanne Rebhan
Japan	Masu Arakawa, Haruko Ishii, Machiko Yamada
Netherlands	Alice Janmaat, Priscilla Sauteer, Marischka Swane
New Zealand	V.A. Bishop, S. Boag, Frances Pere
Puerto Rico	Sally Gonzalez, Linda Lupica, Tati Shapiro
South Africa	Jenny Bruce, Lisle Nel, Alison Sheard
Spain	Emma Villacieros de García-Ogara, Cristina Marsans, Carmen Maestre de Pellon
Sweden	Monica Andersson, Anna Skanse Dönnestad, Liv Wollin
Switzerland	Carole Charbonnier, Verena Salvisberg, Marie Christine de Werra
United States	Cindy Hill, Debbie Massey, Carol Semple
Venezuela	Angeles Alcantara, Elena Larrazabal, Doris Wright

== Results ==
Place	Country	Score	To par
1st place, gold medalist(s)	United States	160-151-156-153=620	+28
T (silver)	(United Kingdom) Great Britain & Ireland	160-157-160-159=636	+44
T (silver)	South Africa	162-159-161-154=636	+44
4	Australia	168-155-158-156=637	+45
5	Spain	165-154-162-158=639	+47
6	Italy	159-156-162-163=640	+48
7	France	160-165-170-152=647	+55
8	Sweden	168-161-158-163=650	+58
9	Switzerland	164-168-166-156=654	+62
10	Canada	164-164-168-159=655	+63
11	Japan	167-165-163-162=657	+65
12	Brazil	168-169-164-164=665	+73
13	Netherlands	165-167-172-164=668	+76
14	New Zealand	175-167-175-159=676	+84
15	Argentina	168-172-172-170=682	+90
16	Belgium	172-169-172-174=687	+95
17	Chile	177-178-174-163=692	+100
18	Jamaica	181-177-180-174=712	+120
19	Dominican Republic	185-174-181-178=718	+126
20	Puerto Rico	183-183-186-170=722	+130
21	Venezuela	189-181-181-181=732	+140
22	Bermuda	208-205-207-194=814	+222

== Individual leaders ==
There was no official recognition for the lowest individual scores.

Place	Player	Country	Score	To par
1	Cindy Hill	United States	76-79-79-73=307	+15
2	Debbie Massey	United States	84-72-77-81=314	+22
3	Jane Lock	Australia	83-76-79-77=315	+23
4	Federica Dassù	Italy	78-79-79-80=317	+25
5	Cristina Marsans	Spain	81-75-80-82=318	+26
6	Alison Sheard	South Africa	83-81-81-74=319	+27
T7	Betty Cole	Canada	83-80-83-75=321	+29
T7	Catherine Lacoste	France	78-84-88-71=321	+29
T7	Carmen Maestre de Pellon	Spain	84-79-82-76=321	+29
T10	Julia Greenhalgh	(United Kingdom) Great Britain & Ireland	80-84-79-81=324	+32
T10	Anna Skanse Dönnestad	Sweden	83-81-77-82=324	+32
T10	Marie Christine Werra	Switzerland	82-84-80-78=324	+32
