= 1981 Peter Jackson Classic =

Coordinates: 45.343368°N 73.980138°W

The 1981 Peter Jackson Classic was contested from July 2–5 at Summerlea Golf & Country Club. It was the 9th edition of the Peter Jackson Classic, and the third edition as a major championship on the LPGA Tour.

This event was won by Jan Stephenson.

== Final leaderboard ==
Place	Player	Score	To par	Money (US$)
1	(Australia) Jan Stephenson	69-66-70-73=278	−10	30,000
T2	(United States) Pat Bradley	69-66-70-74=279	−9	16,800
T2	(United States) Nancy Lopez	70-72-68-69=279	−9	16,800
4	(United States) Patty Hayes	71-67-71-72=281	−7	10,000
5	(United States) Sandra Haynie	68-69-74-71=282	−6	8,000
6	(United States) Patty Sheehan	71-71-72-69=283	−5	7,000
T7	(United States) JoAnne Carner	70-71-70-73=284	−4	5,867
T7	(United States) Alice Miller	73-71-69-71=284	−4	5,867
T7	(United States) Hollis Stacy	73-71-70-70=284	−4	5,867
T10	(United States) Sandra Post	73-71-71-71=286	−2	4,600
T10	(South Africa) Alison Sheard	71-74-71-70=286	−2	4,600
T10	(United States) Jo Ann Washam	71-69-70-76=286	−2	4,600
