= Wilma Aitken =

Scottish amateur golfer (born 1959)

Personal information
- Full name: Wilma Dickson Aitken
- Nationality: Scotland
- Born: 24 January 1959 (age 67) Scotland

Career
- Sport: Golf
- Status: Amateur

Wilma Dickson Aitken (later Leburn, born 24 January 1959) is a Scottish amateur golfer. She won the 1977 Girls Amateur Championship and was a three-time winner of the Helen Holm Scottish Women's Open Championship. She was runner-up in the 1981 British Ladies Amateur and played in the 1982 Curtis Cup.

== Golf career ==
In July 1975, Aitken won the Scottish Girls Championship beating Suzanne Cadden by one hole in the final. She played for Scotland in the Girls Home Internationals later in the year and again in 1976, when Scotland won the title. In July 1977, she won the Scottish Girls title for the second time, beating Gillian Wilson narrowly in the final. The following month she played again in the Home Internationals and the week after won the Girls Amateur Championship, beating Sue Bamford, 2 and 1, in the final.

In 1978, Aitken won the Helen Holm Scottish Women's Open Championship, 6 strokes ahead of the runner-up. She was also runner-up in the Women's British Open, two strokes behind Janet Melville, and the following week played in the Colgate European Open, an LPGA Tour event, where she finished as the leading amateur, although 17 strokes behind the winner, Nancy Lopez. Later in the year, she made her debut for the Scotland in the Women's Home Internationals. She played for Scotland in the 1979 European Ladies' Team Championship in Ireland, Scotland losing to France in the quarter-finals. In 1980, Aitken was not selected for the Curtis Cup team but had success in the Helen Holm Championship for the second time, winning this time by four strokes.

The following month she won a 36-hole event on the Ladies European Tour at Gleddoch House Hotel & Golf Club in Langbank, Renfrewshire, Scotland, the 1980 Carlsberg Championship – Gleddoch House She was the only amateur in the field.

In 1981, Aitken was runner-up in both the Scottish Women's Amateur Championship and the British Ladies Amateur, losing to Alison Gemmill in the Scottish event and then to Belle Robertson at the 20th hole in the British championship. In August, she won the 36-hole Riccarton Rose Bowl at Hamilton Golf Club. During her second round, she had 9 birdies in a row from the 3rd hole to the 11th and finished with a 10-under-par round of 64. Later in 1981, Aitken made her debut for the British team, in the Vagliano Trophy match in Spain, although the team lost to the Continent of Europe. She had an early season success in the 1982 Avia Foursomes. Playing with Angela Uzielli, they won by four strokes. She also won the Helen Holm Scottish Women's Open Championship for the third time, and was later selected for the 1982 Curtis Cup team. The match, in Denver, was very one-sided with the United States winning by 11 points.

Aitken made her second appearance in the Vagliano Trophy in 1983 at Woodhall Spa, the Great Britain and Ireland team winning by 14 points to 10. In 1984 at Royal Troon, she led the qualifying by four strokes and reached the semi-finals of the British Ladies Amateur, before losing to Jody Rosenthal. Aitken, by then Mrs. Leburn, made her final appearance for Scotland in the 1985 Women's Home Internationals.

== Professional wins (1) ==
=== Ladies European Tour (1) ===
No.	Date	Tournament	Winning score	Margin of victory	Runners-up
1	30 May 1980	Carlsberg Championship – Gleddoch House (as an amateur)	+3 (75-72=147)	2 strokes	(England) Vanessa Marvin (England) Joanna Smurthwaite

== Team appearances ==
- Curtis Cup (representing Great Britain & Ireland): 1982
- Vagliano Trophy (representing Great Britain & Ireland): 1981, 1983 (winners)
- European Ladies' Team Championship (representing Scotland): 1979, 1981, 1983
- Women's Home Internationals (representing Scotland): 1978, 1979 (winners), 1980, 1981 (winners), 1982, 1983, 1985
- Girls Home Internationals (representing Scotland): 1975, 1976 (winners), 1977
