= 1981 European Ladies' Team Championship =

Golf competition

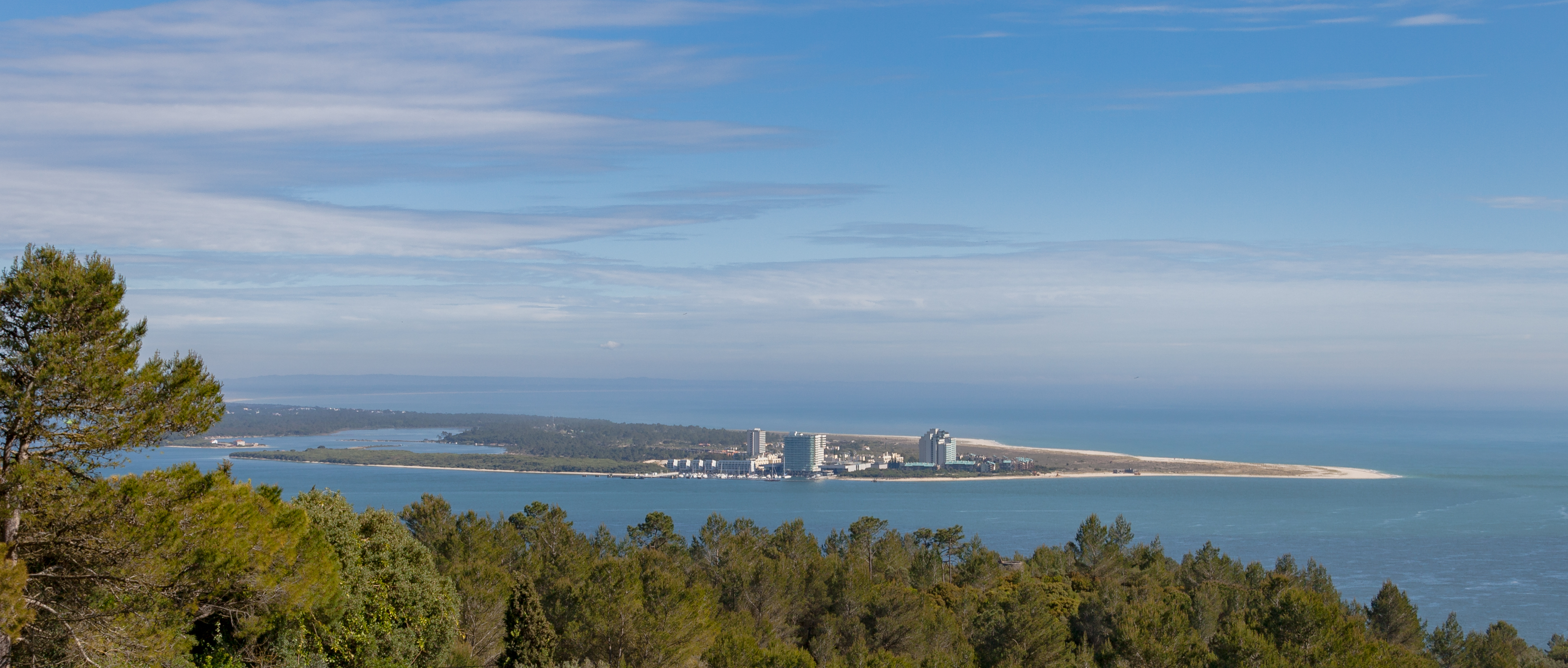
- The Tróia Peninsula

Tournament information
- Dates: 24–28 June 1981
- Location: Tróia Peninsula, Carvalhal, Grândola Municipality, Portugal; 38°28′45″N 8°53′26″W
- Course: Tróia Resort
- Organized by: European Golf Association
- Format: 36 holes stroke play Knock-out match-play

Statistics
- Par: 73
- Field: 15 teams 90 players

Champion
- Sweden; Hillevi Hagström, Viveca Hoff, Gisela Linnér, Charlotte Montgomery, Pia Nilsson, Liv Wollin
- Qualification round: 776 (+46); Final match 4 1/2–2 1/2

Location map
- Location in Europe Location in Portugal

The 1981 European Ladies' Team Championship took place 24–28 June at the Tróia Resort in Carvalhal, Portugal. It was the twelfth women's golf amateur European Ladies' Team Championship.

== Venue ==
The course was designed by Robert Trent Jones and situated on the Tróia Peninsula, Grândola Municipality, 40 kilometres south-east of the city center of Lisbon, Portugal, stretched along the beach, with views over the sea and with sandy roughs.

The championship course was set up with par 73.

== Format ==
All participating teams played two qualification rounds of stroke-play with six players, counted the five best scores for each team.

The eight best teams formed flight A, in knock-out match-play over the next three days. The teams were seeded based on their positions after the stroke-play. The first placed team was drawn to play the quarter-final against the eight placed team, the second against the seventh, the third against the sixth and the fourth against the fifth. In each match between two nation teams, two 18-hole foursome games and five 18-hole single games were played. Teams were allowed to switch players during the team matches, selecting other players in to the afternoon single games after the morning foursome games. Games all square after 18 holes were declared halved, if the team match was already decided.

The seven teams placed 9–15 in the qualification stroke-play formed Flight B, to play similar knock-out play to decide their final positions.

== Teams ==
15 nation teams contested the event. Each team consisted of six players.

Players in the leading teams

Country	Players
Denmark	Mette Andersen, Anette Hagdrup, Merete Meiland, Anette Peitersen, Tina Pors, Lotta Schmidt
France	Eliane Berthét, Nathalie Jeanson, Sophie Lapaire, Marie-Laure de Lorenzi, Cécilia Mourgue d'Algue
Italy	Emanuelo Braito, Marina Buscaini, Federica Dassù, P. Tolomei, S. Valli
Scotland	Wilma Aitken, L. Bennett, Alison Gemmill, Belle Robertson, Gillian Stewart, Pam Wright
Spain	Ana Monfort de Albox, Marta Figueras-Dotti, Elena Larrazabal, Cristina Marsans, Vicky Pertierra
Sweden	Hillevi Hagström, Viveca Hoff, Gisela Linnér, Charlotte Montgomery, Pia Nilsson, Liv Wollin
West Germany	Sabine Blecher, Silke Greve, Susanne Knödler, Astrid Peter, Marion Thannhäuser, Ines Umsen

Other participating teams

Country
Belgium
England
Ireland
Netherlands
Norway
Portugal
Switzerland
Wales

== Winners ==
Four-times-champions team France won the opening 36-hole qualifying competition, with a score of 37 over par 767, nine strokes ahead of team Sweden. Defending champions team Ireland made it to the quarter-finals, finishing eighth, on the same score as ninth-placed team Wales, but with the tie-breaking better non-counting scores.

Individual leader in the 36-hole stroke-play competition was Charlotte Montgomery, Sweden, with a score of 1-under-par 145, three strokes ahead of her Swedish teammate Liv Wollin.

During the quarter-finals, in the foursome game between Susan Gorman / Claire Hourihane, Ireland, and Elaine Berthet / Sophie Lapaire, France, Hourihane made a hole-in-one on the 150 meters 11th hole, using a 6-iron. However, the French pair won the game and team France eventually advanced to the final of the tournament.

Team Sweden won the championship, earning their first title, beating France in the final 4 1/2–2 1/2, despite France was leading 2–0 after the morning foursomes. Playing in their ninth final, France had finished on the podium in all twelve European Ladies' Team Championships played since its inauguration in 1959. Team Spain, earned third place, beating Scotland 5–2 in the third place match.

The three teams placed first, second and third, were awarded with gold-, silver- and bronze-medals respectively, introduced by the organizing European Golf Association.

== Results ==
Qualification round

Team standings

Place	Country	Score	To par
1	France	378-389=767	+37
2	Sweden	384-392=776	+46
3	Spain	380-400=780	+50
4	Scotland	390-399=789	+59
5	Italy	401-399=800	+70
6	West Germany	394-407=801	+71
7	Denmark	396-409=807	+77
T8	Ireland *	403-407=810	+80
T8	Wales	810	+80
10	Switzerland	812	+82
11	Netherlands	819	+89
12	England	823	+93
13	Belgium	824	+94
14	Norway	834	+104
15	Portugal	940	+210

* Note: In the event of a tie the order was determined by the better total non-counting scores.

Individual leaders

Place	Player	Country	Score	To par
1	Charlotte Montgomery	Sweden	72-73=145	−1
2	Liv Wollin	Sweden	74-74=148	+2
T3	Eliane Berthet	France	74-75=149	+3
T3	Alison Gemmill	Scotland	74-75=149	+3
5	Elena Larrazabal	Spain	71-79=150	+4
6	Tina Pors	Denmark	73-78=151	+5
T7	Anna Albox	Spain	75-77=152	+6
T7	Federica Dassù	Italy	75-77=152	+6
T7	Marie-Laure de Lorenzi	France	75-77=152	+6
10	Cécilia Mourgue d'Algue	France	75-78=153	+7

Note: There was no official award for the lowest individual score.

Flight A

Bracket

Quarter finals
Sweden	4.5
Denmark	2.5
Spain	5
West Germany	2
Scotland	4
Italy	3
France	5
Ireland	2

Semi finals
Sweden	4
Spain	3
France	4
Scotland	3

Final
Sweden	4.5
France	2.5
Bronze match
Spain	5
Scotland	2

Elimination matches
Italy	5
Ireland	2
Denmark	4.5
West Germany	2.5

Match for 5th place
Italy	7
Denmark	0
Match for 7th place
West Germany	4.5
Ireland	2.5

Final games

Sweden	France
4.5	2.5
H. Hagström / L. Wollin	C. Mourge d'Algue / M.L de Lorenzi 1 hole
C. Montgomery / P. Nilsson	E. Berthet / S. Lapaire 5 & 4
Liv Wollin 1 hole	Marie Laure de Lorenzi
Pia Nilsson 1 hole	Eliane Berthét
Gisela Linnér AS *	Cecilia Morgue d'Algue AS *
Hillevi Hagström 3 & 1	Sophie Lapaire
Charlotte Montgomery 3 & 1	Nathalie Jeanson

* Note: Game all square after 18 holes declared halved, since team match already decided.

Final standings

Place	Country
1st place, gold medalist(s)	Sweden
2nd place, silver medalist(s)	France
3rd place, bronze medalist(s)	Spain
4	Scotland
5	Italy
6	Denmark
7	West Germany
8	Ireland
9	Netherlands
10	England
11	Wales
12	Switzerland
13	Norway
14	Belgium
15	Portugal

== See also ==
- Espirito Santo Trophy – biennial world amateur team golf championship for women organized by the International Golf Federation.
- European Amateur Team Championship – European amateur team golf championship for men organised by the European Golf Association.
