= Pia Nilsson (golfer) =

Swedish professional golfer and coach (born 1958)

Personal information
- Full name: Pia Lena T. Nilsson
- Nationality: Sweden
- Born: 8 May 1958 (age 68) Malmö, Sweden
- Height: 5 ft 6 in (1.68 m)

Career
- Sport: Golf
- College: Arizona State University
- Status: Professional
- Former tours: LPGA Tour; Ladies European Tour
- Professional wins: 5

Best results in LPGA major championships
- Chevron Championship: DNP
- Women's PGA C'ship: T44: 1983
- U.S. Women's Open: T44: 1986
- du Maurier Classic: T45: 1983

Pia Nilsson (born 8 May 1958) is a Swedish professional golfer and coach. She was one of the two players, who were the first female Swedes to play collegiate golf at a university in the United States and the first Swede to captain a European Solheim Cup team.

== Early life ==
In 1958, Nilsson was born in Malmö, Sweden. She began playing golf at around 6 years of age, with her family at Torekov Golf Club in another part of Scania in southern Sweden, when they spend their summers there. At 14 years of age, her handicap had gone down to 10.

In her golf career, Nilsson later also came to represent Ystad Golf Club, Jönköping Golf Club, Ljunghusen Golf Club, and Lidingö Golf Club.

Nilsson first represented Sweden at the European Lady Junior's Team Championship in 1975 and continued to do so five years in a row. In 1978, at Is Molas Golf Club, Sardinia, Italy, Sweden won the championship for the first time ever.

In 1976, at 18 years of age, Nilsson reached the semi-finals of the Swedish Match-play Championship and finished second at the Swedish International Stroke-play Championship. At the last-mentioned tournament, she was also part of winning the Swedish Team Championship with Ljunghusen Golf Club. Her achievements in 1976, earned her a place, as one of the three best female amateurs in the country, in the Swedish team at the Espirito Santo Trophy.

== Amateur career ==
In the late 1970s, Nilsson began attending Arizona State University. Together with Charlotte Montgomery, Nilsson was the first female Swede to play collegiate golf at a university in the United States. In 1981, Nilsson graduated with a Bachelor of Science in Physical Education having made All-Conference Second Team in 1980–1981.

In 1977, Nilsson beat her Swedish compatriot Charlotte Montgomery in a play-off for the title at en international amateur tournament in Torreon, Mexico.

In 1979, Nilsson won the Swedish Junior Stroke-play Championship at Sollentuna Golf Club outside Stockholm.

She appeared in the 1980 Espirito Santo Trophy at the Pinehurst Resort in Pinehurst, North Carolina, United States, were the Swedish team finished 7th and Nilsson 10th individually as best Swedish player.

In March 1981, Nilsson represented Sweden, together with Charlotte Montgomery, at the international World Cup team competition for two-women national teams in Cali, Colombia. Sweden won as a team, seven strokes ahead of Spain.

She was a member of the winning Swedish team at the 1981 European Ladies' Team Championship at Troia Golf Club, Portugal. It was Sweden's first victory ever in this championship.

== Professional career ==
After being ill at the previous attempt in Houston, Texas, six months earlier, Nilsson qualified for the U.S.-based LPGA Tour at her third attempt, when she succeeded through the LPGA Tour Qualifying School at Bent Tree, Sarasota, Florida, in December 1982, finishing 3rd among 153 players competing for 15 available spots.

She played on the LPGA Tour from 1983 to 1987 with moderate success. Her best finish was tied 11th at the 1984 Konica San Jose Classic held at the Almaden Golf & Country Club in San Jose, California, six strokes behind winner Amy Alcott. Nilsson ended the 1984 season 84th on the LPGA Tour money ranking.

She also played in Europe, winning her first professional tournament on the Swedish Golf Tour, at the time named the Telia Tour, at the 1986 SI Trygg-Hansa Open. She had seven other Swedish Golf Tour wins 1986–1990, including the 1989 Swedish Matchplay Championship, which since 1984 was open for professionals to enter.

She became head coach for the Swedish National Women's Teams (juniors, amateurs and pros) in Sweden from 1990 to 1995 and Head Coach for the Swedish National Teams (men and women; pros, amateurs and juniors) from 1996 to 1998.

By captain Mickey Walker, Nilsson was appointed assistant captain of the 1996 European Solheim Cup team. Two years later, as the first ever Swede, she was captain of the European team in 1998 Solheim Cup at Muirfield Village, Ohio, United States, were the U.S. team defeated the European team by 16–12. Six of the twelve players in the European team, and four of the five captain picks, were Swedish born.

She was co-founder with Lynn Marriott and head coach of Vision54 Golf Academy in Phoenix, Arizona, United States and co-author of books Every Shot Must Have a Purpose and The Game Before the Game.

She coached a number of LPGA Tour professionals including being coach and mentor to Annika Sörenstam.

== Awards and honors ==
- In 1982, she earned the Elite Sign No. 68 by the Swedish Golf Federation, on the basis of national team appearances and national championship performances.
- In 1993, she earned the Merit Sign in Gold by PGA of Sweden.
- In 1998, she earned the King of Sweden Medal of the 8th dimension with a Royal Blue Ribbon for leadership in sports.
- In 1999, she became an Honorary Member of the PGA of Sweden.
- In 2023, she was inducted into the Swedish Golf Hall of Fame.

== Personal life ==
Nilsson lives in Scottsdale, Arizona, United States. She also has a summer house in Torekov, Sweden. She is a member of Talking Stick Golf Club in Scottsdale and Torekov Golf Club in Sweden.

She was a member of the board of the PGA of Sweden 1989–1993 and became an Honorary member of the PGA of Sweden in 1999 and of the LPGA Teaching and Club Professionals in 2000.

== Amateur wins ==
- 1977 International tournament (Torreon, Mexico)
- 1979 Swedish Junior Stroke-play Championship
- 1981 World Cup (Cali, Colombia) (team with Charlotte Montgomery)

== Professional wins (8) ==
=== Swedish Golf Tour wins (8) ===
- 1986 (2) Hooks Pro-Am, SI Trygg-Hansa Open
- 1987 (1) IBM Ladies Open
- 1988 (1) Ängsö Ladies Open
- 1989 (3) Stora Lundby Ladies Open, Swedish Match-play Championship, Grundig Team Trophy (with Hillewi Hagström)
- 1990 (1) Grundig Team Trophy (with Hillewi Hagström)

== Team appearances ==
Amateur

- European Lady Junior's Team Championship (representing Sweden): 1975, 1976, 1977, 1978 (winners), 1979
- Espirito Santo Trophy (representing Sweden): 1976, 1980
- European Ladies' Team Championship (representing Sweden): 1977, 1981 (winners)
- World Cup (Cali, Colombia): 1981 (winners)

Professional

- Solheim Cup (representing Europe): 1998 (non-playing captain)
