= Julia Greenhalgh =

English amateur golfer

Personal information
- Full name: Julia A. Greenhalgh
- Nationality: England
- Born: 6 January 1941 (age 85) Lancashire, England

Career
- Sport: Golf
- Status: Amateur

Julia A. Greenhalgh (later Merrill, born 6 January 1941) was an English amateur golfer. She was runner-up in the 1978 Ladies' British Open Amateur Championship. She won the Ladies' British Open Amateur Stroke Play Championship in 1974 and 1975 and the English Women's Amateur Championship in 1966 and 1979. She played in the Curtis Cup five times, in 1964, 1970, 1974, 1976 and 1978.

== Golf career ==
In 1957, Greenhalgh reached the semi-finals of the Girls Amateur Championship at North Berwick, losing to Ruth Porter. In 1959 at Woolaton Park, she reached the final but lost narrowly to Sheila Vaughan. In 1960 she won the British Girls' Stroke-play Championship at Ranfurly Castle, an under-21 event, a stroke ahead of the defending champion Diana Robb.

In 1960, Greenhalgh made her debut for England in the Women's Home Internationals and in 1961 played for Great Britain & Ireland in the Vagliano Trophy. She missed out on selection for the 1962 Curtis Cup match but later in the year she reached the semi-finals of the Ladies' British Open Amateur Championship, losing 5 and 4, to Marley Spearman. In 1963, she played In the Commonwealth Trophy in Australia. Great Britain won the event with Greenhalgh winning all her six matches. During the trip, she also reached the semi-finals of the Australian Women's Amateur and won the New Zealand Amateur Championship. She was selected for the 1964 Curtis Cup team despite having been dropped from the England team for the Home Internationals. In 1966 at Hayling Island, she won the English Women's Amateur Championship, beating Jean Holmes, 3 and 1, in the final. She was selected for the Curtis Cup team for the 1966 match in Hot Springs, Virginia but later withdrew with an injured wrist, an injury that caused her to miss much of the next two years.

Greenhalgh won the Ladies' British Open Amateur Stroke Play Championship two years in succession, in 1974 and 1975, and won the Welsh Women's Open Stroke Play Championship in 1977. In 1977, she led the qualifying for the Ladies' British Open Amateur Championship while in 1978 she reached the final, losing by one hole to Edwina Kennedy. In 1979, she won the English Women's Amateur Championship for a second time, beating Sue Hedges in the final. Her wrist injury recurred in mid-1979 and marked an end to her appearances at the highest level.

Greenhalgh was a regular player in international matches for Great Britain & Ireland and for England in the 1970s. Over her career, she played in five Curtis Cup matches, three times in America, and four Vagliano Trophy matches. As well as her Commonwealth Trophy match in Australia in 1963, she also played in 1975. She played in the Espirito Santo Trophy in Spain in 1970, in the Dominican Republic in 1974 and in Fiji in 1978. She made her final appearance for England in the 1979 European Ladies' Team Championship.

== Personal life ==
Greenhalgh married Ambrose Robert Merrill (1924–2010) in 1985.

== Team appearances ==
- Curtis Cup (representing Great Britain & Ireland): 1964, 1970, 1974, 1976, 1978
- Vagliano Trophy (representing Great Britain & Ireland): 1961 (winners), 1965, 1975 (winners), 1977 (winners)
- Espirito Santo Trophy (representing Great Britain & Ireland): 1970, 1974, 1978
- Commonwealth Trophy (representing Great Britain): 1963 (winners), 1975 (winners)
- European Ladies' Team Championship (representing England): 1971 (winners), 1975, 1977 (winners), 1979
- Women's Home Internationals (representing England): 1960 (winners), 1961, 1963 (winners), 1966 (winners), 1969, 1970 (winners), 1971 (winners), 1975 (winners), 1976 (winners), 1977 (winners), 1978 (winners)
- England–Scotland girls match (representing England): 1957 (winners), 1958 (winners), 1959 (winners)
