= 1980 Espirito Santo Trophy =

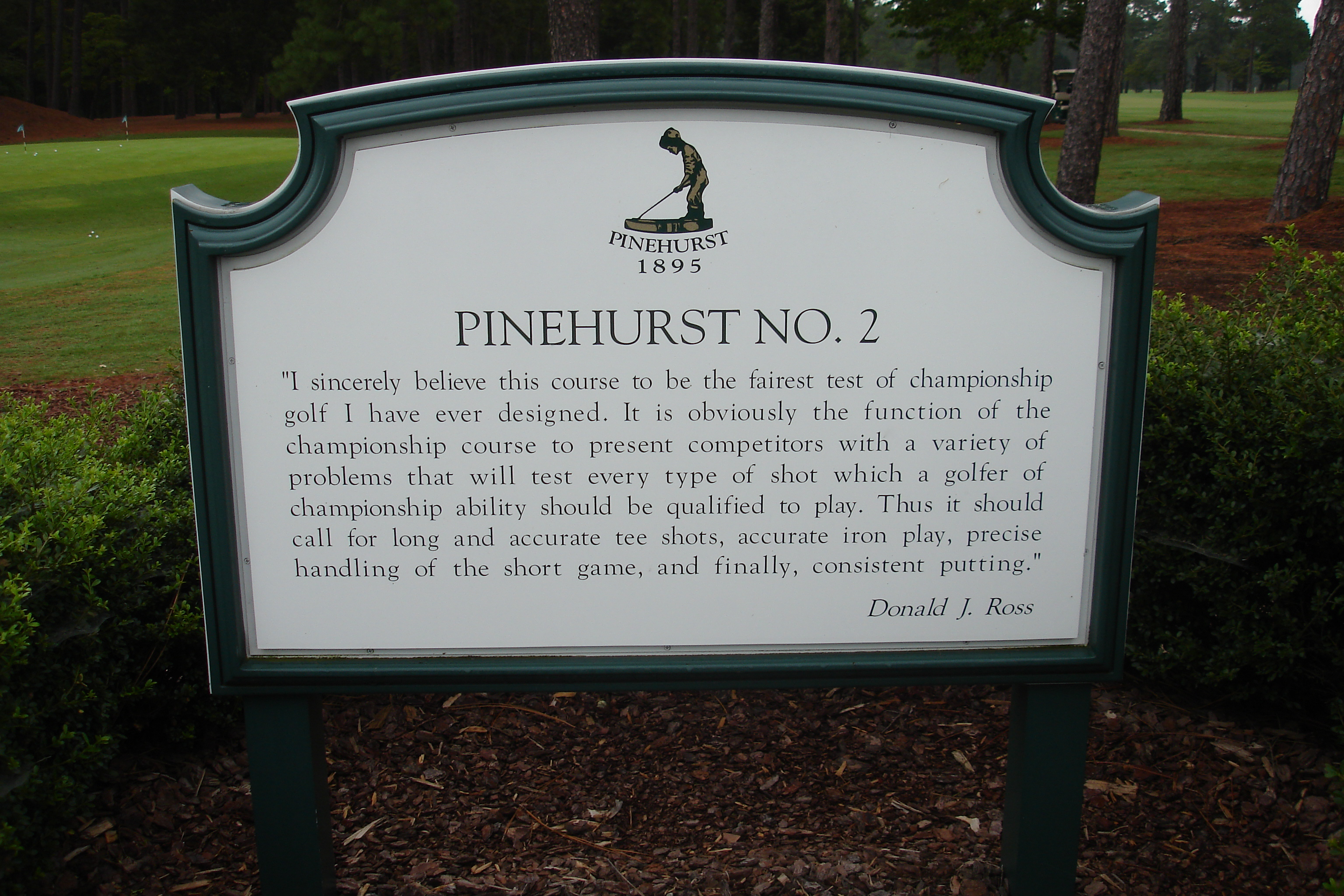
- Pinehurst Country Club Course No. 2

Tournament information
- Dates: 1–4 October
- Location: Pinehurst, North Carolina, U.S. 35.190°N 79.468°W
- Courses: Pinehurst Country Club (No. 2 course)
- Organized by: World Amateur Golf Council
- Format: 72 holes stroke play

Statistics
- Par: 74
- Length: 5,940 yards (5,430 m)
- Field: 28 teams 83 players

Champion
- United States; Juli Inkster, Patti Rizzo, Carol Semple
- 588 (−4)
- Location in the United States Location in North Carolina

The 1980 Espirito Santo Trophy took place 1–4 October at Pinehurst Country Club in Pinehurst, North Carolina, United States. It was the ninth women's golf World Amateur Team Championship for the Espirito Santo Trophy. The tournament was a 72-hole stroke play team event with 28 teams, each with up to three players. The best two scores for each round counted towards the team total.

The United States team won the Trophy, taking back the title from four years ago and winning their seventh title, beating defending champions team Australia by seven strokes. Australia earned the silver medal while team France and the combined team of Great Britain and Ireland, shared the bronze on tied third place another 15 strokes behind.

== Teams ==
28 teams contested the event. Each team had three players, except Guatemala, who had two.

Country	Players
Argentina	Susanna B. Garmendia, Maria E. Noguerol, Beatriz G. Rossello
Australia	Lindy Goggin, Edwina Kennedy, Jane Lock
Belgium	Isabelle Declerq, Marie-Noelle Herkens, Francoise De Wagheneire
Bermuda	Judithanne Astwood Outerbridge, Barbara Mulder, Ginette Spinucci
Brazil	Isabel D. Lopes, Elisabeth Nickhorn, Tiemi Nomura
Canada	Barbara Bunkowsky, Lynn Cooke, Judy Ellis
Chile	Maria Pia Aguirre, Ana Maria Cambiaso, Beatriz Steeger
China	Li-Ying Chen, Bie-Shyun Huang, Hsiu-Tien Su
Colombia	Patricia Gonzalez, Gloria de Pardo, Monica Tamayo
Fiji	Anna Dunn, Tuli Naisara, Myrtle Pickering
France	Elaine Berthet, Marie-Laure de Lorenzi, Cécilia Mourgue d'Algue
(United Kingdom) Great Britain & Ireland	Jane Connachan, Maureen Madill, Belle Robertson
Guatemala	Nancy D. de Noguera, Florencia H. de Rolz
Italy	Emanuelo Braito, Marina Buscaini, Federica Dassù
Japan	Haruko Ishi, Toshi Matsubara, Haruyo Miyazawa
Mexico	Carolina Fernandez, Pilar Guzman, Adriana Ramirez
Netherlands	Alice Janmaat, Joyce Heysler, Ineke Keunen
New Zealand	Liz Douglas, Brenda Rhodes, Jan Scandrett
Norway	Reidun S. Dirdal, Lilly Gulliksen, Mette Rinde Reuss
Peru	Mariza Alzamora, Alicia Dibos, Juana M. de Nari
South Africa	Rae Hast, Sheree Muirhead, Vicky Farrell
Spain	Marta Figueras-Dotti, Ana Monfort de Albox, Carmen Maestre de Pellon
Sweden	Viveca Hoff, Pia Nilsson, Liv Wollin
Switzerland	Annette Hadorn, Regine Lautens, Marie Christine de Werra
United States	Juli Inkster, Patti Rizzo, Carol Semple
Venezuela	Angeles Alcantara, Gracielo Quintana, Gracielo Plaza
West Germany	Ursula Beer, Sabine Blecher, Barbara Böhm
Zimbabwe	Vivienne Browning, Linda Turnbull, Rowena Wepener

== Results ==
Place	Country	Score	To par
1st place, gold medalist(s)	United States	151-145-148-144=588	−4
2nd place, silver medalist(s)	Australia	150-146-151-148=595	+3
T (bronze)	France	158-150-156-146=610	+18
T (bronze)	Spain	159-145-150-156=610	+18
5	(United Kingdom) Great Britain & Ireland	156-154-149-156=615	+23
T6	Italy	158-155-156-152=621	+29
T6	Sweden	156-154-154-157=621	+29
T8	Canada	160-151-155-156=622	+30
T8	Switzerland	157-158-152-155=622	+30
10	Japan	159-157-157-155=628	+36
11	New Zealand	157-157-153-163=630	+38
12	China	160-155-157-161=633	+41
13	West Germany	160-153-158.164=635	+43
14	South Africa	160-161-156-161=638	+46
T15	Argentina	160-166-161-156=643	+51
T15	Netherlands	162-159-162-160=643	+51
T17	Belgium	169-163-154-163=649	+57
T17	Brazil	162-158-163-166=649	+57
19	Norway	167-162-160-162=651	+59
20	Colombia	171-164-166-162=663	+71
21	Zimbabwe	168-168-162-174=666	+74
22	Peru	169-163-162-174=668	+76
23	Chile	169-160-173-169=671	+79
24	Mexico	171-167-175-168=681	+89
25	Venezuela	171-168-169-177=685	+93
26	Bermuda	181-179-179-179=711	+119
27	Guatemala	170-192-173-178=713	+121
28	Fiji	183-183-185-188=739	+147

== Individual leaders ==
There was no official recognition for the lowest individual scores.

Place	Player	Country	Score	To par
1	Patti Rizzo	United States	73-70-75-76=294	+2
2	Edwina Kennedy	Australia	73-71-76-76=296	+4
3	Marta Figueras-Dotti	Spain	80-70-71-77=298	+6
4	Lindy Goggin	Australia	77-75-75-72=299	+7
5	Juli Inkster	United States	78-75-74-73=300	+8
6	Carol Semple	United States	78-79-74-71=302	+10
7	Federica Dassù	Italy	78-75-77-74=304	+12
8	Cécilia Mourgue d'Algue	France	79-73-79-75=306	+14
9	Marie-Laure de Lorenzi	France	79-80-77-71=307	+15
T10	Jane Connachan	(United Kingdom) Great Britain & Ireland	78-73-76-81=308	+16
T10	Pia Nilsson	Sweden	79-77-75-77=308	+16
