= Marta Figueras-Dotti =

Spanish professional golfer (born 1957)

Personal information
- Nationality: Spain
- Born: 12 November 1957 (age 68) Madrid, Spain
- Height: 5 ft 8 in (1.73 m)

Career
- Sport: Golf
- College: University of Southern California
- Turned professional: 1982
- Former tours: LPGA Tour (1984–2000); Ladies European Tour (1983)
- Professional wins: 5

Number of wins by tour
- LPGA Tour: 1
- Ladies European Tour: 3
- Other: 1

Best results in LPGA major championships
- Chevron Championship: T5: 1988
- Women's PGA C'ship: T3: 1988
- U.S. Women's Open: T12: 1987
- du Maurier Classic: T12: 1996
- Women's British Open: DNP

Marta Figueras-Dotti (born 12 November 1957) is a retired Spanish professional golfer.

== Early life ==
In 1957, Figueras-Dotti was born in Madrid, Spain. Her father was the president of the Spanish Golf Association. She started playing golf at 8 years of age.

Figueras-Dotti represented Spain seven straight years at the European Lady Junior's Team Championship, for players up to the age of 21. She played between the years of 1973–1979, being on the winning team in 1975 and 1977 and also winning individually in 1977.

== Amateur career ==
In the late 1970s, Figueras-Dotti entered the University of Southern California (USC). She played on the golf team. She continued to play in elite European amateur tournaments during the summer. In 1979, Figueras-Dotti won the Spanish Closed Amateur, the French Amateur, and the Italian Open Amateur Championships. At the 1979 European Ladies' Team Championship, where she was part of the Spanish team, at Hermitage Golf Club, outside Dublin, Ireland, she won the individual stroke-play part of the competition, three strokes ahead of the nearest competitor. In July 1980, she entered the Women's British Open at Wentworth Club, England, as an amateur, lead after the first round and finished tied second one stroke behind Debbie Massay. In 1982, she graduated from USC earning All-American honors her senior year.

She remained an amateur through the main part of the 1982 season. At the British Ladies Amateur in June, she was tied winner of the 36-hole stroke-play qualification, but was sent out from the tournament in the following match-play. In late July, she entered the 1982 Women's British Open at Royal Birkdale Golf Club, Southport, England, still an amateur. Figueras-Dotti was one shot from the lead after three rounds, but took command of the tournament on the 8th hole of the final round. Despite a bogey 6 on the last hole, she won by one shot, scoring level par over 72 holes. She remains the last amateur to have won the Women's British Open, the tournament that has been recognized as an LPGA major since 2001. She ended her amateur career by finishing individual runner-up to Juli Inkster at the 1982 Espirito Santo Trophy in Lausanne, Switzerland.

== Professional career ==
Figueras-Dotti became the first Spanish female tournament golf professional. She failed in her first attempt to qualify for the LPGA Tour at the Qualifying School in Sarasota, Florida, in January 1983. Instead Figueras-Dotti started her professional career in Europe, on the Women Professional Golfers’ European Tour, later named the Ladies European Tour, and quickly won two tournaments in June 1983.

In 1984, her first year on the LPGA Tour, she tied 2nd at the Safeco Classic, at Meridian Valley Country Club in Kent, Washington, and was named the 1984 Rookie of the Year by Golf Digest.

Figueras-Dotti played on the LPGA Tour from 1984 to 2000. Her career earnings totaled $1,247,905. In 1990, she played a limited schedule after undergoing surgery for a thyroid tumor. She won one tournament, the 1994 Cup Noodles Hawaiian Ladies Open. She became the first Spanish winner on the LPGA Tour. She also won the unofficial JCPenney Classic with Brad Bryant that year.

Figueras-Dotti never got the opportunity to play in the Solheim Cup. Nevertheless, she captained the European team at the 2002 Junior Solheim Cup, acted as a Solheim Cup team helper three times, including in 2013 when Europe secured their first victory on U.S. soil, and was appointed vice-captain for the 2017 Solheim Cup in Iowa, by European team captain Annika Sörenstam.

She is the Chairperson of the board of the Ladies European Tour. She runs her own golf academy in her hometown Madrid, Spain. Until 2015, she was coaching the Spanish national amateur team and is, since 2016, Director of coaching at the Golf Federation of Morocco.

== Personal life ==
In 1997, she gave birth to her first child.

== Amateur wins ==
- 1979 Spanish Junior Championship, Spanish Closed Amateur Championship, French Open Amateur Championship, Italian Open Amateur Championship
- 1982 Italian Open Amateur Championship

== Professional wins (5) ==
=== LPGA Tour wins (1) ===
No.	Date	Tournament	Winning score	Margin of Victory	Runner-up
1	19 Feb 1994	Cup Noodles Hawaiian Ladies Open	–7 (68-70-71=209)	1 stroke	(United States) Jane Geddes

LPGA Tour playoff record (0–1)

No.	Year	Tournament	Opponent	Result
1	1988	AI Star/Centinela Hospital Classic	(United States) Nancy Lopez	Lost to par on second extra hole

=== Ladies European Tour wins (3) ===
No.	Date	Tournament	Winning score	Margin of Victory	Runner(s)-up
1	1 Aug 1982	Pretty Polly Women's British Open (as an amateur)	E (72-73-75-76=296)	1 stroke	(United States) Rosie Jones (England) Jenny Lee Smith
2	10 Jun 1983	United Friendly Worthing Open	+4 (75-69-73=217)	5 strokes	(England) Beverly Huke
3	29 Jun 1983	Guernsey Open	–7 (66-74-69=209)	3 strokes	(England) Beverly Huke

Note: Figueras-Dotti won the Women's British Open once before it became co-sanctioned by the LPGA Tour in 1994 and recognized as a major championship by the LPGA Tour in 2001.

=== Other wins (1) ===
- 1994 JCPenney Classic (with Brad Bryant)

== Team appearances ==
Amateur

- European Lady Junior's Team Championship (representing Spain): 1973, 1974, 1975 (winners), 1976, 1977 (winners), 1978
- European Ladies' Team Championship (representing Spain): 1975, 1977, 1979, 1981
- Vagliano Trophy (representing the Continent of Europe): 1981 (winners)
- Espirito Santo Trophy (representing Spain): 1978, 1980, 1982
