= Anne Marie Palli =

French professional golfer (born 1955)

Personal information
- Nationality: France
- Born: 18 April 1955 (age 71) Ciboure, France
- Height: 5 ft 8 in (1.73 m)

Career
- Sport: Golf
- Status: Professional
- Current tour: Legends Tour
- Former tour: LPGA Tour (1979-2003)
- Professional wins: 3

Number of wins by tour
- LPGA Tour: 2
- Other: 1

Best results in LPGA major championships
- Chevron Championship: T16: 1984
- Women's PGA C'ship: T9: 1990
- U.S. Women's Open: T28: 1987
- du Maurier Classic: T19: 1984
- Women's British Open: DNP

Anne Marie Palli (born 18 April 1955) is a French professional golfer who played on the LPGA Tour.

== Career ==
Palli represented her country seven years in a row at the European Lady Junior's Team Championship, for players up to the age of 21, winning four times with her team and three times (1973, 1974 and 1976) individually.

16 years old, she made her debut at the European Ladies' Team Championship in 1971 at Ganton Golf Club, England, earning a silver medal with her team, after France lost in the final against the host nation.

Palli won twice on the LPGA Tour: in 1983 and 1992.

== Professional wins (3) ==
=== LPGA Tour wins (2) ===
No.	Date	Tournament	Winning score	Margin of victory	Runner-up
1	6 Mar 1983	Samaritan Turquoise Classic	−14 (68-69-68=205)	7 strokes	(United States) Lynn Adams
2	14 Jun 1992	ShopRite LPGA Classic	−6 (69-69-69=207)	Playoff	(England) Laura Davies

LPGA Tour playoff record (1–0)

No.	Year	Tournament	Opponent	Result
1	1992	ShopRite LPGA Classic	(England) Laura Davies	Won with birdie on first extra hole

=== Other wins (1) ===
- 1982 Dodger Pines Ladies Classic

== Team appearances ==
Amateur

- European Lady Junior's Team Championship (representing France): 1970 (winners), 1971 (winners), 1972, 1973 (winners), 1974 (winners), 1975, 1976
- European Ladies' Team Championship (representing France): 1971, 1973, 1975
- Espirito Santo Trophy (representing France): 1972, 1976

Professional

- Handa Cup (representing World team): 2006, 2007, 2008, 2009, 2010, 2011, 2012 (tie)
