= Mary Gorry =

Irish amateur golfer

Personal information
- Nationality: Ireland
- Born: c.1952 Baltinglass, County Wicklow, Ireland

Career
- Sport: Golf

Mary Gorry (born c.1952) is an Irish amateur golfer.

== Early life ==
Mary Gorry was born in Baltinglass, County Wicklow; daughter of Pat Gorry, a pharmacist, and his wife, Eileen. Gorry's sister, Hilda, played interprovincial golf for Leinster and was a member of the Irish Girls team in the Home Internationals. The two girls and both their parents were involved in Baltinglass Golf Club. Her brother, Paul, is a genealogist and historian.

== Amateur career ==
Gorry played as a member of the Irish Home International team from 1971 to 1980, played again in 1988, and was non-playing captain in 1989. She won the Irish Women's Amateur Close Championship in 1975 and 1978, and was a semi-finalist at the 1977 British Ladies Amateur.

At the 1976 Ladies' European Open Championship, Gorry was disqualified after the second round for using an illegal putter. In 1977, she played for Britain and Ireland against the Continent of Europe, winning the Vagliano Trophy. She was named "Women's Amateur Player of the Year" by the Irish Golf Writers Association in 1977 and 1978. She was the first person to receive two IGWA awards. Gorry was a member of the Irish team that won the 1979 European Ladies' Team Championship at Hermitage Golf Club.

== Team appearances ==
Amateur

- Women's Home Internationals (representing Ireland): 1971, 1972, 1973, 1974, 1975, 1976, 1977, 1978, 1979, 1980 (winners)
- European Ladies' Team Championship (representing Ireland): 1971, 1975, 1977, 1979 (winners)
- Vagliano Trophy (representing Great Britain & Ireland): 1977 (winners)
