= 1963 European Ladies' Team Championship =

Golf competition

Tournament information
- Dates: 16–21 July 1963
- Location: Rungsted Kyst, Denmark; 55°53′N 12°32′E
- Course: Rungsted Golf Club
- Organized by: European Golf Association
- Format: 36 holes stroke play round-robin system match play

Statistics
- Par: 73
- Field: 8 teams circa 40 players

Champion
- Belgium; Juliette de Schutter, Josyane Leysen, J. Vivario, Arlette Engel-Jacquet, Louise Van den Berghe
- Qualification round: 476 (+38); Flight A matches: 6 points

Location map
- Location in Europe Location in Denmark

The 1963 European Ladies' Team Championship took place 16–21 July on the Rungsted Golf Club 15 kilometres south of Helsingør, Denmark. It was the third ladies' amateur golf European Ladies' Team Championship.

== Format ==
All participating teams played two qualification rounds of stroke play, counting the three best scores out of up to four players for each team. The four best teams formed flight A. Since team West Germany was disqualified, there were three remaining teams and they formed flight B.

The winner in each flight was determined by a round-robin system. All teams in the flight met each other and the team with most points for team matches in flight A won the tournament, using the scale, win=2 points, halved=1 point, lose=0 points. In each match between two nation teams, two foursome games and four single games were played.

== Teams ==
Eight nation teams contested the event. Each team consisted of a minimum of four players.

Players in the leading teams

Country	Players
Belgium	Juliette de Schutter, Josyane Leysen, J. Vivario, Arlette Engel-Jacquet, Louise Van den Berghe
Denmark	Bjørg Dam, Vibeke Knudsen, Tove Palsby Geertz, Anette Slebsager, Karin Vang Sigumfeldt Birch
France	Claudine Cros, Martine Gajan-Giraud, Ghintran, Lally de Saint-Sauveur (playing captain), Brigitte Varangot
Sweden	Liv Forsell, Ann-Marie Brynolf, Britt Matsson, Cecilia Rosenqvist, Ann-Katrin Svensson, Louise Johansson Wingård
West Germany	Marietta Gütermann, Barbara Hobirk, Monika Möller, Marion Petersen, Monika Steegman

Other participating teams

Country
Italy
Netherlands
Spain

== Winners ==
Team Belgium won the championship for the first time. Defending champions team France earned second place, on the same number of match points as Belgium, but with fewer won game points. The championship was decided in the last match between Belgium and France and the last single game between Josyane Leysen, Belgium and Lally de Saint-Sauveur, France. The game was tied going into the last hole were both players had putts for birdie. After Segard had failed to make her putt, Leysen made her birdie putt from 5 meters, why Leysen won the game and Belgium tied the match.

Sweden, for the first time on the podium, earned third place. Host nation Denmark made their first appearance in the championship and finished fourth.

Individual winner in the opening 36-hole stroke play qualifying competition was Liv Forsell, Sweden, with a score of 5-over-par 151.

== Results ==
Qualification rounds

Team standings

Place	Country	Score	To par
1	France	235-231=466	+28
2	Belgium	237-239=476	+38
3	Sweden	245-240=485	+47
4	Denmark	496	+58
T5	Netherlands*	497	+59
T5	Italy	497	+59
7	Spain	503	+61
DQ	West Germany**		

* Note: In the event of a tie the order was determined by the better total non-counting scores.

** Note: Team West Germany was disqualified due to two cases of signing a wrong score card at the first qualifying round.

Individual leaders

Place	Player	Country	Score	To par
1	Liv Forsell	Sweden	73-78=151	+5
2	Claudine Cros	France	74-78=152	+6

Note: There was no official recognition for the lowest individual score.

Flight A

Team matches

2	Belgium	Sweden	0
4.5		1.5	

2	France	Denmark	0
3.5		2.5	

2	France	Sweden	0
4.5		1.5	

2	Belgium	Denmark	0
4		2	

2	Sweden	Denmark	0
4		2	

1	Belgium	France	1
3		3	

Team standings

Country	Place	W	T	L	Game points	Points
Belgium	1	2	1	0	11.5–6.5	5
France	2	2	1	0	10–8	5
Sweden	3	1	0	1	7–11	2
Denmark	4	0	1	2	6.5–11.5	0

Flight B

Team matches

2	Netherlands	Spain	0
4.5		1.5	

2	Italy	Spain	0
5		1	

2	Italy	Netherlands	0
4.5		1.5	

Team standings

Country	Place	W	T	L	Game points	Points
Italy	5	2	0	0	9.5–2.5	4
Netherlands	6	1	0	1	6–6	2
Spain	7	0	0	2	2.5–9.5	0

Final standings

Place	Country
1st place, gold medalist(s)	Belgium
2nd place, silver medalist(s)	France
3rd place, bronze medalist(s)	Sweden
4	Denmark
5	Italy
6	Netherlands
7	Spain

== See also ==
- Espirito Santo Trophy – biennial world amateur team golf championship for women organized by the International Golf Federation.
- European Amateur Team Championship – European amateur team golf championship for men organised by the European Golf Association.
