= Marjory Ferguson =

Scottish amateur golfer

Personal information
- Full name: Marjory Anne Ferguson
- Nationality: Scotland
- Born: 15 May 1937 North Berwick, Scotland
- Died: August 2003 (aged 66) North Berwick, Scotland

Career
- Sport: Golf
- Status: Amateur

Marjory Anne Ferguson (née Fowler, 15 May 1937 – August 2003) was a Scottish amateur golfer. She was a finalist in the Scottish Women's Amateur Championship in 1966 and 1971 and was a member of the 1966 Curtis Cup team.

== Golf career ==
Ferguson played for Scotland in the annual England–Scotland girls match in 1953, 1954 and 1955. In 1955 she won the girls' section of the British Youths Open Championship at Erskine, the first time the under-21 event had been held. She was runner-up in 1956 behind Belle McCorkindale and won again in 1957 at Kilmacolm. In 1960 she won the Portuguese International Ladies Amateur Championship.

Ferguson was twice runner-up in the Scottish Women's Amateur Championship losing both times to Belle Robertson. In 1966, she lost by 2 and 1 at Machrihanish while in 1971 she lost 3 and 2 at Royal Dornoch.

Ferguson made her debut for Scotland in the 1959 Women's Home Internationals. She made a total of 10 appearances in the event between 1959 and 1985. She also played for Scotland in the European Ladies' Team Championship in 1965, 1967 and 1971. She made her debut in a British team in the Vagliano Trophy match in 1965. Ferguson was selected for the 1966 Curtis Cup team in Hot Springs, Virginia. She was only selected for one of the four sessions, the first day singles where she lost to Carol Flenniken.

== Personal life ==
Ferguson was born in North Berwick in May 1937, the daughter of John C. Fowler. She married Alistair Ferguson in 1968. She died at her North Berwick home in August 2003.

== Team appearances ==
- Curtis Cup (representing Great Britain & Ireland): 1966
- Vagliano Trophy (representing Great Britain & Ireland): 1965
- European Ladies' Team Championship (representing Scotland): 1965, 1967, 1971
- Women's Home Internationals (representing Scotland): 1959, 1962 (winners), 1963, 1964, 1965, 1966, 1967 (tied), 1969 (winners), 1970, 1985
- England–Scotland girls match (representing Scotland): 1953, 1954, 1955
