= Nancy Wright =

Welsh amateur golfer

Personal information
- Full name: Helen Nancy McLean Wright
- Nationality: Wales
- Born: 28 March 1917
- Died: 3 June 1994 (aged 77)

Career
- Sport: Golf
- Status: Amateur

Helen Nancy McLean Wright (née Cook, 28 March 1917 – 3 June 1994) was a Welsh amateur golfer. She won the Welsh Ladies' Amateur Championship six times between 1953 and 1967.

== Golf career ==
Wright won the Welsh Ladies' Amateur Championship six times, in 1953, 1954, 1955, 1958, 1965 and 1967, and was runner-up four times, in 1950, 1951, 1964 and 1968. Her first and final appearances in the final were both at Royal Porthcawl, losing to Dr. Phyllis Garfield Evans in 1950 and to Sylvia Hales in 1968. In October 1969, she reached the semi-finals of the French championship.

In 1938, she made her debut for Wales in the Women's Home Internationals. She played again in the first post-war event in 1947 and played most years until 1968, making her final appearance in 1971. She also played for Wales in the 1964 Espirito Santo Trophy, when the four home nations competed separately, and in the European Ladies' Team Championship in 1965 and 1971.

== Personal life ==
She married Marcus Thurlow Wright (1896–1994) in 1956.

== Team appearances ==
- Espirito Santo Trophy (representing Wales): 1964
- European Ladies' Team Championship (representing Wales): 1965, 1971
- Women's Home Internationals (representing Wales): 1938, 1947, 1948, 1949, 1951, 1952, 1953, 1954, 1956, 1957, 1958, 1959, 1960, 1962, 1963, 1964, 1966, 1967, 1968, 1971
