= British Youths Open Championship =

Youths golf tournament from 1954 to 1994

Tournament information
- Established: 1954
- Format: stroke play
- Month played: August
- Final year: 1994

The British Youths Open Championship was a youths golf tournament that was played from 1954 to 1994. It was 72-hole stroke-play event for golfers under 22. From 1954 to 1962, it was organised by a committee led by Sam Bunton, a Glasgow architect, and was open to assistant professionals as well as amateurs, but from 1963, it was taken over by The R&A and became an amateur-only event, called: the British Youths Open Amateur Championship. The R&A dropped the event because they felt it was no longer needed to bridge the gap between boy's and men's golf. A 54-hole girls' event was also held. In 1963, the event was taken over by the Scottish Ladies' Golfing Association and called the Scottish Girls' Open Stroke-play Championship.

== Winners ==
Year	Winner	Score	Margin of victory	Runner(s)-up	Venue	Ref
1954	(Scotland) John More (p)	287	1 stroke	(Scotland) David Mackie	Erskine	
1955	(England) Brian Stockdale	297	Playoff	(England) Michael Bonallack	Pannal	
1956	(Scotland) Alan Bussell	287	Playoff	(Scotland) Peter Binns	Barnton	
1957	(Scotland) George Will	290	6 strokes	(Scotland) Angus Grossart	Pannal	
1958	(Wales) Richard Kemp (p)	281	7 strokes	(Wales) Brian Huggett (p) (England) Tony Jowle	Dumfries & County	
1959	(England) Tony Jowle	286	7 strokes	(England) Tony Highfield (p) (England) Jack Sanderson (Scotland) Eddie Shamash	Pannal	
1960	(England) Alex Caygill (p)	279	7 strokes	(Scotland) Campbell Brownlee	Pannal	
1961	(Scotland) John Martin	284	5 strokes	(England) Alan Scott	Bruntsfield Links	
1962	(England) Alex Caygill (p)	287	12 strokes	(England) Cliff Bowman	Pannal	
1963	(Scotland) Alistair Low	283	Playoff	(Scotland) David Murdoch	Pollok	
1964	(England) Brian Barnes	290	4 strokes	(Scotland) Scott Macdonald (Scotland) George Macgregor	Pannal	
1965	(England) Peter Townsend	281	3 strokes	(United States) Buddy Allin	Gosforth Park	
1966	(England) Peter Oosterhuis	219	4 strokes	(England) Bob Durrant (England) Michael Kelley	Dalmahoy	
1967	(England) Peter Benka	278	Playoff	(Scotland) Bernard Gallacher	Copt Heath	
1968	(England) Peter Benka	281	Playoff	(England) Bob Durrant	Ayr Belleisle	
1969	(England) John Cook	289	2 strokes	(Italy) Baldovino Dassù (England) Andrew Forrester (Republic of Ireland) Leonard Owens	Lindrick	
1970	(Italy) Baldovino Dassù	276	2 strokes	(England) Alan Bird	Barnton	
1971	(England) Pip Elson	277	3 strokes	(England) Warren Humphreys	Northamptonshire County	
1972	(England) Andrew Chandler	281	2 strokes	(England) Pip Elson	Glasgow Gailes	
1973	(England) Carl Mason	284	3 strokes	(Scotland) Garry Harvey	Southport and Ainsdale	
1974	(Scotland) David Robertson	284	3 strokes	(Scotland) Sandy Stephen	Downfield	
1975	(England) Nick Faldo	278	1 stroke	(England) Martin Poxon	Pannal	
1976	(England) Malcolm Lewis	277	Playoff	(Scotland) Peter Wilson	Gullane	
1977	(England) Sandy Lyle	285	6 strokes	(Scotland) Steve Martin (Scotland) Paul McKellar	Moor Park	
1978	(Scotland) Brian Marchbank	278	3 strokes	(Wales) Hugh Evans	East Renfrewshire	
1979	(Scotland) Gordon Brand Jnr	291	1 stroke	(Scotland) Colin Dalgleish (Scotland) Paul Gallagher	Woodhall Spa	
1980	(Scotland) Garry Hay	303	Playoff	(Republic of Ireland) Philip Walton	Royal Troon	
1981	(Sweden) Torbjörn Antevik	290	1 stroke	(Scotland) John Huggan	West Lancashire	
1982	(Wales) Philip Parkin	280	7 strokes	(Scotland) Colin Dalgleish	New course, St Andrews	
1983	(Wales) Paul Mayo	290	1 stroke	(England) Craig Laurence	Sunningdale	
1984	(Wales) Richard Morris	281	2 strokes	(England) Andy Clapp	Blairgowrie	
1985	(Spain) José María Olazábal	291	6 strokes	(England) Steven Bottomley (Scotland) Andrew McQueen (Republic of Ireland) Eoghan O'Connell	Ganton	
1986	(England) David Gilford	283	8 strokes	(Denmark) Jan Pedersen	Carnoustie	
1987	(England) James Cook	283	Playoff	(Sweden) Olle Nordberg	Hollinwell	
1988	(France) Christian Cévaër	275	Playoff	(England) Craig Cassells	Royal Aberdeen	
1989	(England) Mike Smith	285	Playoff	(Scotland) Andrew Coltart	Ashburnham	
1990	(Sweden) Mathias Grönberg	275	1 stroke	(Scotland) Andrew Coltart	Southerness	
1991	(England) Jim Payne	287	Playoff	(England) Ralph Hutt	Woodhall Spa	
1992	(England) Warren Bennett	282	3 strokes	(England) Stephen Pullan	Gosforth Park	
1993	(England) Lee Westwood	278	8 strokes	(Scotland) Steven Carmichael	Glasgow Gailes	
1994	(Sweden) Freddie Jacobson	277	2 strokes	(England) Simon Hurd	Royal St David's	

(p) = professional

In 1954 there was an under-18 section which was won by Ronnie Shade.

== International matches ==
In 1955, an international match between England and Scotland was arranged the day before the start of the championship, although the match had a lower age limit than that used in the championship. Another match was arranged the following year, although the result was decided on holes rather than matches. There was no match in 1957 but it was arranged again in 1958 and 1959. From 1960, the event was contested for the Alex Mackay Memorial Trophy.

In 1967, a second match was arranged, between Great Britain & Ireland and the Continent of Europe, later called the EGA Trophy. This was played the day before the start of the championship with the England/Scotland match being played a day earlier. The same system was retained for a number of years while the EGA Trophy match was played before the championship. In 1976, and on a number of occasions from 1980, the EGA Trophy match was not played in connection with the championship, and on those occasions, the England/Scotland match was played the day before the championship rather than two days before.

== British Girls' Stroke-play Championship ==
The girls' section of the British Youths Open Championship was inaugurated in 1955 and played over 54 holes. It was later called the British Girls' Stroke-play Championship. In 1963, the event was taken over by the Scottish Ladies' Golfing Association and called the Scottish Girls' Open Stroke-play Championship. The Scottish under-21 event was played from 1963 until 2015, when it was dropped from the schedule. The last winner was Cloe Frankish.

- 1955 (Scotland) Marjory Fowler
- 1956 (Scotland) Belle McCorkindale
- 1957 (Scotland) Marjory Fowler
- 1958 (England) Ruth Porter
- 1959 (England) Diane Robb
- 1960 (England) Julia Greenhalgh
- 1961 (England) Diane Robb
- 1962 (England) Susan Armitage
- 1963 (England) Ann Irvin
