= Pat Roberts (golfer) =

Welsh amateur golfer (1921–2013)

Personal information
- Full name: Margaret Patricia Roberts
- Nationality: Wales
- Born: 20 April 1921 Pembrokeshire, Wales
- Died: 21 August 2013 (aged 92) Newport, Wales

Career
- Sport: Golf
- Status: Amateur

Margaret Patricia Roberts MBE (20 April 1921 – 21 August 2013) was a Welsh amateur golfer. She won the Welsh Ladies' Amateur Championship four times between 1956 and 1969.

== Golf career ==
Roberts won the Welsh Ladies' Amateur Championship four times, in 1956, 1959, 1963 and 1969, and was runner-up six times, in 1952, 1955, 1957, 1958, 1962 and 1966.

In 1950, Roberts made her debut for Wales in the Women's Home Internationals. She made her final appearance in 1970, playing every year except 1952 and 1954. She also played for Wales in the 1964 Espirito Santo Trophy, when the four home nations competed separately, and in the European Ladies' Team Championship in 1965, 1967 and 1969.

Roberts held a number of positions in the Welsh Ladies' Golf Union, including chairman, secretary and president. She was also a vice captain of Curtis Cup and Vagliano Trophy teams.

== Honours ==
Roberts was appointed a Member of the Order of the British Empire (MBE) in the 1994 New Year Honours as president of the Welsh Ladies' Golf Union, "for services to Golf".

== Team appearances ==
- Espirito Santo Trophy (representing Wales): 1964
- European Ladies' Team Championship (representing Wales): 1965, 1967, 1969
- Women's Home Internationals (representing Wales): 1950, 1951, 1953, 1955, 1956, 1957, 1958, 1959, 1960, 1961, 1962, 1963, 1964, 1965, 1966, 1967, 1968, 1969, 1970
