= Dominga Capati =

Filipino golfer and washerwoman

Personal information
- Nationality: Philippines
- Born: 1909 or 1910
- Died: Late 1960s

Career
- Sport: Golf
- Status: Amateur

Dominga Capati was a Filipino golfer and washerwoman who has won at least five titles in the Philippine Women's Open from 1936 to 1941.

== Career ==
Capati was a laundress at the Canlubang Sugar Estate in Laguna in the 1930s during the American colonial period in the Philippines. She was born around 1909 or 1910.

There are varied accounts on how and when he took up golf. One states she took up the discipline after observing golfers play at the Canlubang golf course. Another account says she took up golf after befriending a caddie. Another mentioned how, American officials who she washed clothes for, noticing her skills, trained her in golf. She owned a golf club that was gifted to her in 1931, and her other equipment are reportedly second-hand.

Capati first competed at the Philippine Women's Open at the Wack Wack Golf Course in Caloocan in 1936. She became the first native Filipina to win the tournament, with the other golfers in the top 16 being American and Europeans.

Capati won again in the 1938 edition, and the three next iterations of the annual amateur women's golf tournament until 1941.

After World War II, Capati is still playing golf. She was part of the Philippines team that contested for the 1964 Espirito Santo Trophy.

== Legacy ==
Capati is recognized as being the pioneer of women's golf in the Philippines. The Dominga Capati Memorial Cup was organized to commemorate her, with the first edition held in March 1968.

In the United States, Capati gained a following among African American golf fans.

== Amateur wins ==
- 1936: Philippine Women's Open
- 1938: Philippine Women's Open
- 1939: Philippine Women's Open
- 1940: Philippine Women's Open
- 1941: Philippine Women's Open

== Team appearances ==
Amateur

- Espirito Santo Trophy (representing Philippines): 1964
