= Ruth Porter =

English amateur golfer (1939–2014)

Personal information
- Nationality: England
- Born: 6 May 1939
- Died: 15 September 2014 (aged 75)

Career
- Sport: Golf
- Status: Amateur

Ruth Porter (later Slark, 6 May 1939 – 15 September 2014) was an English amateur golfer. She had a successful junior career which included winning the 1956 Girls Amateur Championship and the 1958 British Girls' Stroke-play Championship. She won the English Women's Amateur Championship three times between 1959 and 1965, and played in the Curtis Cup in 1960, 1962 and 1964.

== Golf career ==
In 1955 Porter represented England for the first time in the England–Scotland girls match at Beaconsfield and reached the quarter-finals of the subsequent Girls Amateur Championship, before losing to Annette Nicholson. The following year, 1956, she won the Girls Amateur Championship, beating Nicholson 5&4 in the final at Seaton Carew. She made her final appearance in the event at North Berwick in 1957, losing 3&2 in the final to Brigitte Varangot, having beaten Julia Greenhalgh in the semi-finals. In 1958 she won the British Girls' Stroke-play Championship, an under-21 event, at Ranfurly Castle, winning by four strokes from Jean Letham.

Porter won the 1959 English Women's Amateur Championship at Aldeburgh, beating Frances Smith 5&4 in the final. Later in 1959 she made her debut for England in the Women's Home Internationals, the first time the event was held separately from the Ladies' British Open Amateur Championship, and for Great Britain & Ireland in the Vagliano Trophy, the first time the event was played against a combined Continent of Europe team. Porter make her Curtis Cup debut in 1960 at Lindrick. On the opening day Porter lost her foursomes match 3&2, playing with Frances Smith, having been 9 down after 13.holes of the morning round. The United States regained the cup on the final day. Porter was not originally selected for the singles but was included when Smith was unable to play. She was the only British player to win her singles, beating Joanne Goodwin by one hole.

In 1961, at Littlestone, Porter won the English Women's Amateur Championship for the second time. beating Peggy Reece by two holes in the final. Reece had holed a 90-yard pitch shot to be three up with seven holes to play. However, Porter then won four of the next five holes to take the lead, and won the match at the 36th hole. The following week she won a new event, the 72-hole Astor Prince's Trophy at Prince's Golf Club, by seven strokes from Angela Bonallack. Porter was selected for the 1962 Curtis Cup in Colorado. The British lost heavily winning just one of the nine 36-hole matches. She played with Diane Robb Frearson in the foursomes, losing 8&7 and was not selected for the singles. In 1963, Porter played In the Commonwealth Trophy in Australia, Great Britain winning the event. During the trip, she reached the final of the Australian Women's Amateur, losing to Marlene Streit.

The 1964 Curtis Cup at Royal Porthcawl was the first to have 18-hole matches. Porter played with Sheila Vaughan in both sets of the foursomes matches, winning their match on the first day and halving on the final day. In the singles she beat Nancy Roth but lost to Carol Sorenson. The contest was much closer than that in 1962 with the teams level at the start of the final round of singles matches. In three Curtis Cup contests, she won three matches, lost three and halved one. In 1965 Porter won the English Women's Amateur Championship for the third time in seven years, beating Gillian Cheetham 6&5 in the final at Whittington Barracks. Porter was runner-up in both the 1964 and 1965 Hovis International, behind Margaret Nichol in 1964 and Marley Spearman in 1965. Porter played for England in the 1964 Espirito Santo Trophy, when the four home nations competed separately, and in the winning team in the 1965 European Ladies' Team Championship.

In May 1966 Porter reached the semi-finals of the English Women's Amateur Championship at Hayling, losing to Jean Holmes. Despite this and her performances in 1965, Porter was not in the Curtis Cup team for the match in Hot Springs, Virginia, being selected as second reserve. Liz Chadwick, the first reserve, was added to the team when Julia Greenhalgh withdrew with an injured hand, but Porter failed to make the team. A few days after the Curtis Cup selection she was a joint winner of the Hovis International at Littlestone. She finished tied with Ann Irvin after the final round was abandoned. Later in 1966 she was selected as playing captain of the three-player Great Britain & Ireland team for the Espirito Santo Trophy event in Mexico. In 1968, partnering Ann Irvin, she won the Avia Foursomes.

In 1978 at West Sussex she reached the final of the English Women's Amateur Championship, losing 2&1 to Vanessa Marvin. She died in 2014.

== Personal life ==
Porter married Tony Slark, an international golfer, in 1979.

== Team appearances ==
- Curtis Cup (representing Great Britain & Ireland): 1960, 1962, 1964
- Vagliano Trophy (representing Great Britain & Ireland): 1959 (winners), 1961 (winners), 1965
- Commonwealth Trophy (representing Great Britain): 1963 (winners)
- Espirito Santo Trophy (representing England): 1964, (representing Great Britain & Ireland): 1966
- European Ladies' Team Championship (representing England): 1965 (winners)
- Women's Home Internationals (representing England): 1959 (winners), 1960 (winners), 1961, 1962, 1964 (winners), 1965 (winners), 1966 (winners), 1968 (winners), 1978 (winners)
- England–Scotland girls match (representing England): 1955 (winners), 1956 (winners), 1957 (winners)
