= Shelley Hamlin =

American professional golfer (1949–2018)

Personal information
- Full name: Shelley Lee Hamlin
- Nationality: United States
- Born: May 28, 1949 San Mateo, California, U.S.
- Died: October 15, 2018 (aged 69) Phoenix, Arizona, U.S.
- Height: 5 ft 5 in (1.65 m)

Career
- Sport: Golf
- College: Stanford University
- Turned professional: 1972
- Former tours: LPGA Tour (1972–2000); Legends Tour
- Professional wins: 5

Number of wins by tour
- LPGA Tour: 3
- LPGA of Japan Tour: 1
- Other: 1

Best results in LPGA major championships
- Titleholders C'ship: T24: 1972
- Chevron Championship: T15: 1983
- Women's PGA C'ship: T12: 1992
- U.S. Women's Open: T2: 1973
- du Maurier Classic: 5th: 1992
- Women's British Open: DNP

Achievements and awards
- LPGA William and Mousie Powell Award: 1992
- LPGA Heather Farr Player Award: 1995

Shelley Lee Hamlin (May 28, 1949 – October 15, 2018) was an American professional golfer who played on the LPGA Tour.

== Career ==
Hamlin was born in San Mateo, California. As an amateur golfer, she won the first four California Women's Amateur Championships (1967–1970). She played at Stanford University and won the 1971 national individual intercollegiate golf championship. She played on the 1968 and 1970 Curtis Cup teams and the 1966 and 1968 Espirito Santo Trophy teams. In 1969, she lost in the finals of the U.S. Women's Amateur to Catherine Lacoste.

Hamlin turned professional in 1972 and joined the LPGA Tour. She won three times on the LPGA Tour between 1978 and 1993.

Hamlin was inducted into the Stanford Athletic Hall of Fame in 1971.

== Death ==
Hamlin died on October 15, 2018, at age 69 from breast cancer.

== Amateur wins ==
- 1967 California Women's Amateur
- 1968 California Women's Amateur
- 1969 California Women's Amateur
- 1970 California Women's Amateur
- 1971 AIAW National Collegiate Championship

== Professional wins (5) ==
=== LPGA Tour wins (3) ===
No.	Date	Tournament	Winning score	Margin of victory	Runner(s)-up
1	Aug 27, 1978	Patty Berg Classic	−10 (71-68-69=208)	1 stroke	(United States) Kathy Whitworth
2	Feb 9, 1992	The Phar-Mor at Inverrary	−10 (72-68-66=206)	1 stroke	(United States) Brandie Burton (United States) JoAnne Carner (United States) Dana Lofland
3	Jun 27, 1993	ShopRite LPGA Classic	−9 (67-67-70=204)	2 strokes	(United States) Amy Benz (United States) Beth Daniel (United States) Judy Dickinson

=== LPGA of Japan Tour wins (1) ===
- 1975 Japan Classic

=== Legends Tour wins (1) ===
- 2002 Fidelity Investments Classic

== U.S. national team appearances ==
Amateur

- Curtis Cup: 1968 (winners), 1970 (winners)
- Espirito Santo Trophy: 1966 (winners), 1968 (winners)
