= 1959 European Ladies' Team Championship =

Golf competition

Tournament information
- Dates: 15–20 September 1959
- Location: Cologne, Germany; 50°58′N 7°8′E
- Course: Golf und Land Club Köln
- Organized by: European Golf Association
- Format: 36 holes stroke play round-robin system match play

Statistics
- Par: 74
- Length: 5,987 yards (5,475 m)
- Field: 6 teams circa 30 players

Champion
- France; Claudine Cros, Odile Garaialde Semelaigne, Lally de Saint-Sauveur (captain and substitute player), Martine Paul, Brigitte Varangot
- Qualification round: 447 (+3); Flight A matches: 6 points

Location map
- Location in Europe Location in Germany Location in the Province of North Rhine-Westphalia

The 1959 European Ladies' Team Championship took place 15–20 September on the Golf und Land Club Köln outside Cologne, Germany. It was the first ladies' amateur golf European Ladies' Team Championship.

== Venue ==
The hosting club was founded in 1906 and the championship 18-hole course, situated in Bergisch Gladbach, 10 kilometers east of the city center of Cologne, opened in 1955. The course set up of par 74 had four par-3-holes, eight par-4-holes and six par-5-holes.

The championship course was set up with par 74.

=== Course layout ===
The shown length on each hole was from the club tee. The women's championship tee was approximately 10 percent shorter and totally 5,475 meters.

Hole	Meters	Par	Hole	Meters	Par
1	330	4	10	355	4
2	434	5	11	450	5
3	103	3	12	145	3
4	298	4	13	390	5
5	365	4	14	345	4
6	335	4	15	105	3
7	415	5	16	395	5
8	145	3	17	315	4
9	540	5	18	460	5
Out	2,965	36	In	2,960	38
Source:		Total club tee		5,925	74
Source:		Total women's championship tee		5,475	74

== Format ==
All participating teams played two qualification rounds of stroke play, counting the three best scores out of up to four players for each team. The four best teams formed flight A. The next two teams formed flight B.

The winner in each flight was determined by a round-robin system. All teams in the flight met each other and the team with most points for team matches in flight A won the tournament, using the scale, win=2 points, halved=1 point, lose=0 points. In each match between two nation teams, two foursome games and four single games were played.

== Teams ==
Six nation teams contested the event. Each team consisted of a minimum of four players.

Players in some of the teams

Country	Players
France	Claudine Cros, Odile Garaialde Semelaigne, Lally de Saint-Sauveur (playing captain)*, Martine Paul, Brigitte Varangot
Italy	Rosanna Bergamo, Wanda Bohus Rosa, Paula Cobianchi, Isa Goldschmidt Bevione (playing captain), Pinto
Sweden	Gertrud Ahlberg, Marianne Bergengren, Ann-Marie Brynolf (playing captain), Britt Matsson, Margareta Warberg
West Germany	Ilse Groos, Marietta Gütermann, Monika Möller, Monika Steegman, Liselotte Strenger, Inez Stille

* Note: Playing captain Lally de Saint-Sauveur did not play the qualification round and played one single game and two foursome games in flight A.

Other participating teams

Country
Belgium
Netherlands

== Winners ==
Individual winner in the opening 36-hole stroke play qualifying competition was Odile Garaialde Semelaigne, France, with a score of 5-under-par 143.

Team France won the championship, earning 6 points in flight A.

== Results ==
Qualification rounds

Team standings

Place	Country	Score	To par
1	France	229-218=447	+3
2	Belgium	243-232=475	+31
3	Italy	246-235=481	+37
4	Netherlands	244-241=485	+41
5	West Germany	247-242=489	+45
6	Sweden	259-241=500	+56

Individual leader

Place	Player	Country	Score	To par
1	Odile Garaialde Semelaigne	France	70-73=143	−5

Note: There was no official recognition for the lowest individual score.

Flight A

Team matches

2	Italy	Belgium	0
4		2	

2	France	Netherlands	0
5		1	

2	Belgium	Netherlands	0
5		1	

2	France	Italy	0
4		2	

2	Italy	Netherlands	0
6		0	

2	France	Belgium	0
5.5		0.5	

Team standings

Country	Place	W	T	L	Game points	Points
France	1	2	1	0	14.5–3.5	6
Italy	2	2	0	1	12–6	4
Belgium	3	2	0	1	7.5–10.5	2
Netherlands	4	0	1	2	2–16	0

Flight B

Team match

1	Sweden	West Germany	1
3		3	

Team standings

Country	Place	W	T	L	Game points	Points
Sweden	T5	0	1	0	3–3	1
West Germany	T5	0	1	0	3–3	1

Final standings

Place	Country
1st place, gold medalist(s)	France
2nd place, silver medalist(s)	Italy
3rd place, bronze medalist(s)	Belgium
4	Netherlands
T5	Sweden
T5	West Germany

== See also ==
- Espirito Santo Trophy – biennial world amateur team golf championship for women organized by the International Golf Federation.
- European Amateur Team Championship – European amateur team golf championship for men organised by the European Golf Association.
