= Welsh Ladies' Amateur Championship =

Tournament information
- Location: Wales
- Established: 1905
- Organised by: Wales Golf
- Format: Match play

Current champion
- Ellen Nicholas

The Welsh Ladies' Amateur Championship is the women's national amateur match play golf championship of Wales. It was first played in 1905 and is currently organised by Wales Golf.

The Welsh Ladies' Amateur Championship is contested in two phases. It begins with a 36 hole stroke play competition, with the leading 16 competitors progressing to the knock-out match play competition.

It is a close event, entry being restricted to women who were either born in Wales, had one parent or grandparent born in Wales, or have resided in Wales for two years, if under 18, or for three years, if 18 or over. In addition players must not have played in the ladies closed championship of another country within the last two years or have ever played in the full international team of another country.

== Winners ==
Year	Winner	Score	Runner-up	Venue	Ref
2024	Ellen Nicholas	3 & 2	Gracie Mayo	Royal St David's	
2023	Isabella Hopkins	4 & 3	Lauren Hillier	Newport	
2022	Ffion Tynan	19 holes	Darcy Harry	Pennard	
2021	Isabella Hopkins	8 & 7	Ffion Tynan	Wenvoe Castle	
2020	Not held				
2019	Becky Harries	6 & 5	Bethan Morris	Cradoc	
2018	Lea-Anne Bramwell	2 up	Ffion Tynan	Radyr	
2017	Lauren Hillier	4 & 3	Alice Barnes	Wrexham	
2016	Kath O'Connor	2 up	Lauren Hillier	Cardiff	
2015	Kath O'Connor	2 & 1	Chloe Williams	Vale of Llangollen	
2014	Katie Bradbury	3 & 2	Becky Harries	Monmouthshire	
2013	Becky Harries	2 & 1	Chloe Williams	Nefyn & District	
2012	Amy Boulden	4 & 2	Becky Harries	Cardigan	
2011	Becky Harries	1 up	Amy Boulden	Royal St David's	
2010	Tara Davies	2 & 1	Amy Boulden	Glamorganshire	
2009	Tara Davies	3 & 2	Lucy Gould	Aberdovey	
2008	Kirsty O'Connor	2 up	Stephanie Evans	Monmouthshire	
2007	Breanne Loucks	1 up	Tara Davies	Royal St David's	
2006	Stephanie Evans	3 & 2	Becky Harries	Tenby	
2005	Sarah Jones	5 & 4	Stephanie Evans	Conwy	
2004	Sarah Jones	1 up	Anna Highgate	Royal Porthcawl	
2003	Kate Phillips	2 & 1	Katie Walls	Aberdovey	
2002	Eleanor Pilgrim	1 up	Anna Highgate	Newport	
2001	Becky Brewerton	2 & 1	Sarah Jones	Royal St David's	
2000	Kathryn Evans		Kate Phillips	Pyle & Kenfig	
1999	Becky Brewerton		Becky Morgan	Conwy	
1998	Louise Davis		Becky Morgan	Ashburnham	
1997	Eleanor Pilgrim		Louise Davis	Northop	
1996	Lisa Dermott	4 & 3	Vicki Thomas	Tenby	
1995	Lisa Dermott		Kate Stark	Aberdovey	
1994	Vicki Thomas	19 holes	Lisa Dermott	Royal Porthcawl	
1993	Andrea Donne		Vicki Thomas	Abergele & Pensarn	
1992	Julie Foster		Suzy Boyes	Newport	
1991	Vicki Thomas		Helen Lawson	Royal St David's	
1990	Sharon Roberts		Helen Wadsworth	Ashburnham	
1989	Helen Lawson		Vicki Thomas	Conwy (Caernarvonshire)	
1988	Sharon Roberts		Fiona Connor	Tenby	
1987	Vicki Thomas		Sharon Roberts	Aberdovey	
1986	Vicki Thomas		Lisa Isherwood	Royal Porthcawl	
1985	Vicki Thomas		Sue Jump	Prestatyn	
1984	Sharon Roberts		Karen Davies	Newport	
1983	Vicki Thomas		Tegwen Thomas	Llandudno (Maesdu)	
1982	Vicki Thomas	7 & 6	Mandy Rawlings	Ashburnham	
1981	Mandy Rawlings	5 & 3	Audrey Briggs	Royal St David's	
1980	Mandy Rawlings	2 & 1	Audrey Briggs	Tenby	
1979	Vicki Rawlings	2 up	Audrey Briggs	Caernarvonshire	
1978	Pamela Light	2 & 1	Audrey Briggs	Newport	
1977	Tegwen Perkins	4 & 3	Pamela Whitley	Aberdovey	
1976	Tegwen Perkins	4 & 2	Ann Johnson	Royal Porthcawl	
1975	Ann Johnson	1 up	Kerri Rawlings	Prestatyn	
1974	Audrey Briggs	3 & 2	Hilary Lyall	Ashburnham	
1973	Audrey Briggs	3 & 2	Joan John	Holyhead	
1972	Ann Hughes	3 & 2	Jane Rogers	Tenby	
1971	Audrey Briggs	3 & 1	Penny Davies	Royal St David's	
1970	Audrey Briggs	19 holes	Jill Morris	Newport	
1969	Pat Roberts	3 & 2	Ann Hughes	Caernarvonshire	
1968	Sylvia Hales	3 & 2	Nancy Wright	Royal Porthcawl	
1967	Nancy Wright	21 holes	Christine Phipps	Royal St David's	
1966	Ann Hughes	5 & 4	Pat Roberts	Ashburnham	
1965	Nancy Wright	3 & 2	Elsie Brown	Prestatyn	
1964	Mary Oliver	1 up	Nancy Wright	Southerndown	
1963	Pat Roberts	7 & 5	Nellie Seddon	Royal St David's	
1962	Mary Oliver	4 & 2	Pat Roberts	Radyr	
1961	Mary Oliver	5 & 4	Nellie Seddon	Aberdovey	
1960	Marjorie Barron	8 & 6	Elsie Brown	Tenby	
1959	Pat Roberts	6 & 4	Adrienne Gwyther	Caernarvonshire	
1958	Nancy Wright	1 up	Pat Roberts	Newport	
1957	Marjorie Barron	6 & 4	Pat Roberts	Royal St David's	
1956	Pat Roberts	2 & 1	Marjorie Barron	Royal Porthcawl	
1955	Nancy Cook	2 up	Pat Roberts	Holyhead	
1954	Nancy Cook	1 up	Elsie Brown	Tenby	
1953	Nancy Cook	3 & 2	Elsie Lever	North Wales	
1952	Elsie Lever	6 & 5	Pat Roberts	Southerndown	
1951	Isabella Bromley-Davenport	1 up	Nancy Cook	Royal St David's	
1950	Philomena Garfield Evans	2 & 1	Nancy Cook	Royal Porthcawl	
1949	Sheila Bryan-Smith		Elsie Brown	Newport	
1948	Isabella Seely		Marjorie Barron	Prestatyn	
1947	Marjorie Barron		Elsie Jones	Prestatyn	
1940–1946: Not played due to World War II
1939	Anne Burrell	2 & 1	Hilda Reynolds	Swansea Bay	
1938	Barbara Pyman	1 up	Mary Emery	North Wales	
1937	Mary Emery	10 & 9	Philomena Whitaker	Royal Porthcawl	
1936	Alison Rieben	2 & 1	Margaret Thompson	Prestatyn	
1935	Abandoned due to snow			Tenby	
1934	Isabella Rieben	3 & 2	Mary Jestyn Jeffreys	Royal St David's	
1933	Mary Jestyn Jeffreys	2 & 1	Eileen Bridge	Royal Porthcawl	
1932	Isabella Rieben	2 & 1	Mary Jestyn Jeffreys	Aberdovey	
1931	Mary Jestyn Jeffreys	4 & 3	Barbara Pyman	Southerndown	
1930	Mary Jestyn Jeffreys	2 up	Alison Rieben	Llandudno (Maesdu)	
1929	Alison Rieben	2 & 1	Barbara Pyman	Tenby	
1928	Margery Duncan	4 & 2	Alison Rieben	Royal St David's	
1927	Margery Duncan	1 up	Molly Blake	Royal Porthcawl	
1926	Mary Justice	4 & 3	Dora Smalley	Aberdovey	
1925	Margaret Cox	9 & 7	Violet Rhys	Tenby	
1924	Margaret Cox	11 & 10	Barbara Pyman	Rhyl	
1923	Margaret Cox	39 holes	Molly Marley	Southerndown	
1922	Margery Duncan	9 & 8	Emily Franklin Thomas	Llandrindod Wells	
1921	Molly Marley	7 & 5	Alison Rieben	Aberdovey	
1920	Isabel Phillips	8 & 6	Molly Marley	Royal Porthcawl	
1915–1919: Not played due to World War I
1914	Mabel Phelips	4 & 3	Edith Morgan	Tenby	
1913	Dorothy Brooke	19 holes	Phyllis Shaw	Rhos-on-Sea	
1912	Blanche Duncan	4 & 2	Polto Williams	Llandrindod Wells	
1911	Edith Clay	2 & 1	Kathleen Allington-Hughes	Royal Porthcawl	
1910	Vivien Lloyd-Roberts	4 & 3	Beatrice Leaver	Rhyl	
1909	Blanche Duncan	4 & 3	Mary Ellis-Griffith	Southerndown	
1908	Blanche Duncan	4 & 2	Nest Lloyd-Williams	Carnarvonshire	
1907	Blanche Duncan	5 & 4	Florence Wenham	Porthcawl	
1906	Blanche Duncan	5 & 4	Beatrice Storry	Radyr	
1905	Evelyn Young	2 & 1	Blanche Duncan	Glamorganshire	
