= 1961 European Ladies' Team Championship =

Golf competition

Tournament information
- Dates: 22–27 September 1961
- Location: Como, Italy; 45°46′40″N 9°8′10″E
- Course: Circolo Golf Villa D'Este
- Organized by: European Golf Association
- Format: 36 holes stroke play round-robin system match play

Statistics
- Par: 69
- Field: 8 teams circa 38 players

Champion
- France; Claudine Cros, Martine Gajan, M Mahé, Lally de Saint-Sauveur, Brigitte Varangot
- Qualification round: 441 (+27); Flight A matches: 6 points

Location map
- Location in Europe Location in Italy Location in the Region of Lombardy

The 1961 European Ladies' Team Championship took place 22–27 September on the Circolo Golf Villa D'Este outside Como, Italy. It was the second ladies' amateur golf European Ladies' Team Championship.

== Venue ==
The course, situated 4 kilometres south-east of Como, Lombardy region, the seventh oldest golf course in Italy, was designed by Peter Gannon and opened in 1926.

The championship course was set up with par 69.

== Format ==
All participating teams played two qualification rounds of stroke play, counting the three best scores out of up to four players for each team. The four best teams formed flight A. The next four teams formed flight B.

The winner in each flight was determined by a round-robin system. All teams in the flight met each other and the team with most points for team matches in flight A won the tournament, using the scale, win=2 points, halved=1 point, lose=0 points. In each match between two nation teams, two foursome games and four single games were played.

== Teams ==
Eight nation teams contested the event. Each team consisted of a minimum of four players. Spain and Portugal took part for the first time.

Players in some of the teams

| Country | Players |
|---|---|
| France | Claudine Cros, Martine Gajan-Giraud, M. Mahé, Lally de Saint-Sauveur (playing captain), Brigitte Varangot |
| Netherlands | L. de Boer, M. Henderson, Annie van Lanslot, Anneke van Riemsdijk |
| Portugal | Barbara de Brito e Cunha, Cardie, Cordier, Vera Costa Lennox, Salette de Sousa e Melo |
| Sweden | Gertrud Ahlberg, Ann-Marie Brynolf (playing captain), Birgit Forsman, Britt Matsson, Ann-Katrin Svensson |
| West Germany | Marietta Gütermann, Vera Möller, Monika Möller, Monika Steegman, Liselotte Strenger |

Other participating teams

Country
Belgium
Italy
Spain

== Winners ==
Defending champions team France won the championship, earning 6 points in flight A. Host nation Italy earned second place, just as they did at the previous championship two years earlier.

Individual winner in the opening 36-hole stroke play qualifying competition was Mercedes Etchart de Ártiach, Spain, with a score of 4-over-par 142.

== Results ==
Qualification rounds

Team standings

| Place | Country | Score | To par |
|---|---|---|---|
| 1 | France | 226-215=441 | +27 |
| 2 | Italy | 229-226=455 | +41 |
| T3 | Spain* | 229-233=462 | +48 |
| T3 | Belgium | 235-227=462 | +48 |
| 5 | West Germany | 233-236=469 | +55 |
| 6 | Netherlands | 237-238=475 | +61 |
| 7 | Sweden | 242-260=502 | +88 |
| 8 | Portugal | 256-256=509 | +95 |

* Note: In the event of a tie the order was determined by the better non-counting score.

Individual leader

| Place | Player | Country | Score | To par |
|---|---|---|---|---|
| 1 | Mercedes Etchart de Ártiach | Spain | 71-71=142 | +4 |

Note: There was no official recognition for the lowest individual score.

Flight A

Team matches

| 2 | France | Belgium | 0 |
| 4 | | 2 | |

| 2 | Italy | Spain | 0 |
| 4 | | 2 | |

| 2 | France | Spain | 0 |
| 5 | | 1 | |

| 2 | Italy | Belgium | 0 |
| 4 | | 2 | |

| 2 | France | Italy | 0 |
| 5 | | 1 | |

| 2 | Spain | Belgium | 0 |
| 4.5 | | 1.5 | |

Team standings

| Country | Place | W | T | L | Game points | Points |
|---|---|---|---|---|---|---|
| France | 1 | 3 | 0 | 0 | 14–4 | 6 |
| Italy | 2 | 2 | 0 | 1 | 9–9 | 4 |
| Spain | 3 | 1 | 0 | 1 | 7.5–10.5 | 2 |
| Belgium | 4 | 0 | 1 | 2 | 5.5–12.5 | 0 |

Flight B

Team matches

| 2 | West Germany | Portugal | 0 |
| 6 | | 0 | |

| 2 | Netherlands | Sweden * | 0 |
| 4 | | 2 | |

| 2 | West Germany | Sweden * | 0 |
| 4 | | 2 | |

| 2 | Netherlands | Portugal | 0 |
| 4 | | 2 | |

| 2 | West Germany | Netherlands | 0 |
| 4.5 | | 1.5 | |

| 2 | Sweden | Portugal | 0 |
| 3.5 | | 2.5 | |

* Note: Sweden was given walkover in three games against the Netherlands and in two games against then West Germany, due to food poisoning.

Team standings

| Country | Place | W | T | L | Game points | Points |
|---|---|---|---|---|---|---|
| West Germany | 5 | 3 | 0 | 1 | 14.5–3.5 | 6 |
| Netherlands | 6 | 2 | 0 | 1 | 9.5–8.5 | 4 |
| Sweden | 7 | 1 | | 1 | 7.5–10.5 | 2 |
| Portugal | 8 | 0 | 0 | 0 | 4.5–13.5 | 0 |

Final standings

| Place | Country |
|---|---|
| 1st place, gold medalist(s) | France |
| 2nd place, silver medalist(s) | Italy |
| 3rd place, bronze medalist(s) | Spain |
| 4 | Belgium |
| 5 | West Germany |
| 6 | Netherlands |
| 7 | Sweden |
| 8 | Portugal |

== See also ==
- Espirito Santo Trophy – biennial world amateur team golf championship for women organized by the International Golf Federation.
- European Amateur Team Championship – European amateur team golf championship for men organised by the European Golf Association.
