= 1971 European Ladies' Team Championship =

Golf competition

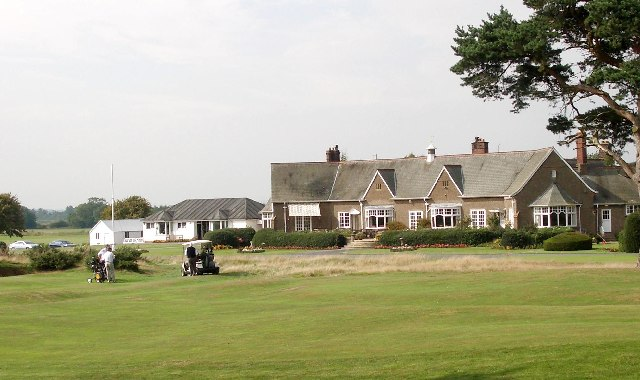
- The clubhouse and 18th green at Ganton Golf Club

Tournament information
- Dates: 30 June – 3 July 1971
- Location: Ganton, North Yorkshire, England; 54.1882°N 0.4962°W
- Course: Ganton Golf Club
- Organized by: European Golf Association
- Format: 18 holes stroke play Knock-out match-play

Statistics
- Par: 75
- Length: 6,289 yards (5,751 m)
- Field: 14 teams circa 70 players

Champion
- England; Sally Barber, Mary Everard, Julia Greenhalgh, Ann Irvin, Dinah Oxley, Mickey Walker
- Qualification round: 318 (+18); Final match: 5–2
- Location in Europe Location on the British Isles Location in England

The 1971 European Ladies' Team Championship took place 30 June – 3 July at Ganton Golf Club, in Ganton, North Yorkshire, England. It was the seventh women's golf amateur European Ladies' Team Championship.

== Venue ==
The hosting club was founded in 1891 and the course was initially designed by Tom Chisholm and Robert Bird, later modified by different course architects, including James Braid, Alister MacKenzie, Harry Colt, John Henry Taylor, and Harry Vardon. It previously hosted the 1949 Ryder Cup and the 1964 Amateur Championship.

The course was set up with par 75 over 6,289 yards, with 38 on the front nine holes and 37 on the back nine.

There was heavy rain the days before the tournament and warm weather with a small breeze during the competition.

== Format ==
All participating teams played one qualification round of stroke-play with up to five players, counted the four best scores for each team.

The eight best teams formed flight A, in knock-out match-play over the next three days. The teams were seeded based on their positions after the stroke play. Each of the four best placed teams were drawn to play the quarter-final against one of the teams in the flight placed in the next four positions. In each match between two nation teams, two 18-hole foursome games and five 18-hole single games were played. Teams were allowed to switch players during the team matches, selecting other players in to the afternoon single matches after the morning foursome matches. Games all square after 18 holes were declared halved, if the team match was already decided.

The six teams placed 9–14 in the qualification stroke-play formed Flight B, to play similar knock-out play to decide their final positions.

== Teams ==
14 nation teams contested the event. Each team consisted of a minimum of four players.

Country	Players
Denmark	B. Holm Pedersen, Vibeke Morgan, Tove Palsby Geertz, Anette Bjerglund, L. Brunn, Karin Vang Sigumfeldt Birch
England	Sally Barber, Mary Everard, Julia Greenhalgh, Ann Irvin, Dinah Oxley, Mickey Walker
France	Odile Semelaigne-Garaïalde, Geraldine Cochet, Martine Gajan-Giraud, Georges Labesse, Anne Marie Palli, Brigitte Varangot
Ireland	Elaine Bradshaw, Mary Gorry, C. McAuley, Mary McKenna, M. Mooney, Vivian Singleton
Italy	R. Boeri, M. Dassù, Isa Goldschmidt Bevione, L. Rivetti, M. Segafredo, Marion Tadini
Luxembourg	A. Delvaux, R. de Muyser, R. Welter, C. Rischard, F. Letellier
Netherlands	Annelies Eschauzier, Priscilla Grosch, Annie Mackeson-Sandbach, Marischka Zegger-Swane, Joyce de Witt Puyt, Ineke Keunen
Norway	Mette Bjørum, Marianne Kohorn, Anniken Langaard, Mette Rinde Reuss, Reidun Stensland
Scotland	Marjory Ferguson, Jillian Hutton, Joan Lawrence, Joan Norris, Belle Robertson, Joan Smith
Spain	Elena Corominas, Carmen Maestre de Pellon, Inés Maestre, Cristina Marsans, Sissy Tolnay, Emma Villacieros de García-Ogara
Sweden	Liv Forsell, Louise Johansson Wingård, Christina Nordström, Nailil Skoog, Ann-Katrin Svensson, Christina Westerberg
Switzerland	Jacqueline Stucki, Marie Christine de Werra, M. Unthard, D. Caillat, B. Zeerleher
Wales	Audrey Briggs, Penny Griffiths Davies, Ann Hughes Johnson, Jean Hughes, Sylvia Webster, Nancy Wright
West Germany	Barbara Böhm, Marion Petersen, Marietta Gütermann, Monika Müller, Katharina Trebitsch

== Winners ==
Tied leaders of the opening 18-hole competition were the finalist teams from the previous championship two years earlier, host nation England and defending champions France, each with an 18-over-par score of 318. Host nation England earned first place on the tie breaking better non-counting score.

Individual leader in the opening 18-hole stroke-play qualifying competition was Marion Petersen, Germany, with a score of 1-over-par 76, one stroke ahead of Julia Greenhalgh, England. Six players in the field broke 80. There was no official award for the lowest individual score.

Team England won the championship, earning their third title, beating defending champions France in the final 5–2. With the win, England became the first nation to win the men's and the women's European amateur team championships in the same year. England came to repeat that achievement the following year.

Team Sweden, for the second time on the podium, beat the Netherlands 5–2 in the third place match.

== Results ==
Qualification round

Team standings

Place	Country	Score	To par
T1	England*	318	+18
T1	France	318	+18
3	Scotland	321	+21
T4	Spain*	329	+29
T4	Sweden	329	+29
6	Netherlands	330	+30
7	West Germany	332	+32
8	Italy	336	+36
9	Ireland	340	+40
10	Wales	341	+41
11	Denmark	355	+55
12	Switzerland	356	+56
13	Norway	358	+58
14	Luxembourg	385	+85

* Note: In the event of a tie the order was determined by the better non-counting score.

Individual leaders

Place	Player	Country	Score	To par
1	Marion Petersen	West Germany	76	+1
2	Julia Greenhalgh	England	77	+2
3	Odile Garaialde	France	78	+3
T4	Geraldine Cochet	France	79	+4
T4	Mary Everard	England	79	+4
T4	Mickey Walker	England	79	+4

Note: There was no official award for the lowest individual score.

Flight A

Bracket

Quarter finals
France	5
West Germany	2
Netherlands	4
Scotland	3
Sweden	5
Spain	2
England	4
Italy	3

Semi finals
France	4
Netherlands	3
England	6.5
Sweden	0.5

Final
England	5
France	2
Bronze match
Sweden	5
Netherlands	2

Elimination matches
Spain	5.5
Italy	1.5
West Germany	5
Scotland	2

Match for 5th place
West Germany	4
Spain	3
Match for 7th place
Scotland	6
Italy	1

Final games

England	France
5	2
A. Irvin / M. Walker	B. Varangot / O. Semelaigne Garaïalde 20th hole
S. Barber / M. Everard 5 & 4	G. Labesse / A. M. Palli
Dinah Oxley 1 hole	Brigitte Varangot
Mickey Walker	O. Semelaigne Garaïalde 1 hole
Mary Everard 3 & 1	Anne Marie Palli
Julia Greenhalgh 6 & 5	G. Labesse
S. Barber 4 & 3	Geraldine Cochet

Flight B

Bracket

Round 1
Norway	4
Switzerland	3
Denmark	5
Luxembourg	2

Round 2
Ireland	6
Norway	1
Wales	5.5
Denmark	1.5

Match for 9th place
Ireland	4
Wales	3
Match for 11th place
Denmark	5
Norway	2

Round 1

Match for 13th place
Switzerland	6
Luxembourg	1

Final standings

Place	Country
1st place, gold medalist(s)	England
2nd place, silver medalist(s)	France
3rd place, bronze medalist(s)	Sweden
4	Netherlands
5	West Germany
6	Spain
7	Scotland
8	Italy
9	Ireland
10	Wales
11	Denmark
12	Norway
13	Switzerland
14	Luxembourg

== See also ==
- Espirito Santo Trophy – biennial world amateur team golf championship for women organized by the International Golf Federation.
- European Amateur Team Championship – European amateur team golf championship for men organised by the European Golf Association.
