= Audrey Briggs =

Welsh amateur golfer

Personal information
- Nationality: Wales
- Born: 31 January 1945 (age 81) Maidstone, Kent, England

Career
- Sport: Golf
- Status: Amateur

Audrey Briggs (née Brown, born 31 January 1945) is a Welsh amateur golfer. She won the Welsh Ladies' Amateur Championship four times in five years from 1970 to 1974. She represented Great Britain & Ireland in the Vagliano Trophy in 1971 and 1973.

== Golf career ==
Briggs reached the final of the Welsh Girls’ Championship in 1963, losing 8&7 to Ann Hughes in the 18-hole final. She won the Welsh Ladies' Amateur Championship four times in five years from 1970 to 1974. In 1970 she beat Jill Morris at the 19th hole. She had further wins in 1971, 1973 and 1974. From 1978 to 1981 she lost four finals in succession, losing in the final to Pamela Light, Vicki Rawlings and twice to Mandy Rawlings. In 1976, playing with Patricia Harvie, she reached the final of the Avia Foursomes, finishing a stroke behind the winners, Sally Barber and Angela Bonallack.

Briggs represented Great Britain & Ireland in the Vagliano Trophy at Worplesdon in 1971 and in the Netherlands in 1973, being on the winning side on both occasions. In 1969 she made her debut for Wales in the Women's Home Internationals and competed in 16 successive events, making her final appearance in 1984. Wales were generally the weakest of the four home nations, only winning three matches during this period, all against Ireland, in 1973, 1975 and 1979. In 1976 they tied all three matches 4½–4½ and finished runners-up to England, who narrowly beat Scotland on the final day. She was also a regular competitor for Wales in the European Ladies' Team Championship.

Originally a member of Rye Golf Club in Sussex, she moved to Royal Liverpool Golf Club from 1970, following her marriage to Lawrence Briggs in late 1969.

== Personal life ==
Briggs's mother, Judy Brown, was also a Welsh international golfer, playing in the Women's Home Internationals five times between 1960 and 1965.

== Team appearances ==
- Vagliano Trophy (representing Great Britain & Ireland): 1971 (winners), 1973 (winners)
- European Ladies' Team Championship (representing Wales): 1969, 1971, 1973, 1975, 1977, 1979, 1981, 1983
- Women's Home Internationals (representing Wales): 1969, 1970, 1971, 1972, 1973, 1974, 1975, 1976, 1977, 1978, 1979, 1980, 1981, 1982, 1983, 1984
