= 1965 European Ladies' Team Championship =

Golf competition

Tournament information
- Dates: 5–10 July 1965
- Location: The Hague, Netherlands; 52°07′52″N 04°21′43″E
- Course: Royal the Hague Golf & Country Club
- Organized by: European Golf Association
- Format: 36 holes stroke play round-robin system match play

Statistics
- Par: 73
- Length: 5,906 yards (5,400 m)
- Field: 11 teams circa 55 players

Champion
- England; Ann Irvin, Marley Spearman, Susan Armitage, Ruth Porter, Jill Thornhill
- Qualification round: 460 (+22); Flight A matches: 5 points
- Location in Europe Location in The Netherlands

The 1965 European Ladies' Team Championship took place 5–10 July at Royal The Hague Golf & Country Club in Wassenaar, 10 kilometres north of the city center of The Hague, Netherlands. It was the fourth women's golf amateur European Ladies' Team Championship.

== Venue ==
The course was designed in 1938, by Harry Colt and C.H. Alison and is situated in an undulating dune landscape.

The championship course was set up with par 73.

It was raining and blowing hard winds during the tournament.

== Format ==
All participating teams played two qualification rounds of stroke play, counting the three best scores out of up to four players for each team. The four best teams formed flight A. The next four teams formed flight B and the last three teams formed flight C.

The winner in each flight was determined by a round-robin system. All teams in the flight met each other and the team with most points for team matches in flight A won the tournament, using the scale, win=2 points, halved=1 point, lose=0 points. In each match between two nation teams, two foursome games and four single games were played.

== Teams ==
A record number of eleven nation teams contested the event. England, Scotland and Wales took part for the first time. Ireland was announced to participate but withdraw before the tournament. Each team consisted of a minimum of four players.

Players in the teams

Country	Players
Belgium	Juliette de Schutter
England	Ann Irvin, Marley Spearman, Susan Armitage, Ruth Porter, Jill Thornhill
France	Claudine Cros, Odile Garaialde Semelaigne, Lally de Saint-Sauveur, Brigitte Varangot
Italy	F. Bastianello, Isa Goldschmidt Bevione, Bianca Martini, Marina Ragher, Marion Tadini
Netherlands	A.E. Eschauzier, Annie van Lanschot, M. Mevus, Anneke van Riemsdijk
Scotland	Marjory Fowler, Joan Lawrence, Belle Robertson, Janette Wright
Spain	M. Artiach, C. Marsans
Sweden	Liv Forsell, Louise Johansson Wingård, Britt Mattsson, Cécilia Perslow, Nina Rehnqvist, Ann-Katrin Svensson
Switzerland	Claudia Fehr, Saskia Fehr, Didi Kellenberger, Jacqueline Stucki
Wales	Elsie Brown, P. Griffiths Davies, Ann Hughes Johnson, Pat Roberts, Nancy Wright
West Germany	Marietta Gütermann, Barbara Hobirk, Monika Möller, Marion Petersen

== Winners ==
Team England, participating for the first time, won the championship, earning 5 points in flight A.

Individual winner in the opening 36-hole stroke play qualifying competition was Brigitte Varangot, France, with a score of 4-over-par 150.

== Results ==
Qualification rounds

Team standings

Place	Country	Score	To par
1	France	226-228=454	+16
2	England	230-230=460	+22
3	Scotland	236-233=469	+31
4	Netherlands	241-245=486	+48
5	Wales	244-244=488	+50
6	West Germany	248-242=490	+52
7	Sweden	249-251=500	+62
8	Italy	257-248=505	+67
9	Belgium	259-252=511	+73
10	Spain	256-264=520	+82
11	Switzerland	285-314=599	+161

Individual leaders

Place	Player	Country	Score	To par
1	Brigitte Varangot	France	74-76=150	+4
2	Ann Irvin	England	77-75=152	+6
T3	Odile Garaialde Semelaigne	France	77-77=154	+8
T3	Janette Wright	Scotland	78-76=154	+8

Note: There was no official recognition for the lowest individual score.

Flight A

Team matches

1	England	Scotland	1
3		3	

1	France	Netherlands	1
3		3	

2	England	Netherlands	0
5		1	

2	France	Scotland	0
4		2	

2	England	France	0
4.5		1.5	

2	Scotland	Netherlands	0
5		1	

Team standings

Country	Place	W	T	L	Game points	Points
England	1	2	1	0	12.5–5.5	5
Scotland	2	1	1	1	10–8	3
France	3	1	1	1	8.5–9.5	3
Netherlands	4	0	1	2	5–13	1

Flight B

Team matches

2	Italy	Wales	0
4		2	

2	West Germany	Sweden	0
4		2	

2	Sweden	Wales	0
4.5		1.5	

2	West Germany	Italy	0
4		2	

2	West Germany	Wales	0
5.5		0.5	

2	Italy	Sweden	0
5.5		0.5	

Team standings

Country	Place	W	T	L	Game points	Points
West Germany	5	3	0	0	13.5–4.5	6
Italy	6	2	0	1	11.5–6.5	4
Sweden	7	1	0	2	7–11	2
Wales	8	0	0	3	4–14	0

Flight C

Team matches

2	Spain	Switzerland	0
5		1	

2	Belgium	Switzerland	0
5		1	

2	Spain	Belgium	0
4.5		1.5	

Team standings

Country	Place	W	T	L	Game points	Points
Spain	9	2	0	0	9.5–2.5	4
Belgium	10	1	0	1	6.5–5.5	2
Switzerland	11	0	0	2	2–10	0

Final standings

Place	Country
1st place, gold medalist(s)	England
2nd place, silver medalist(s)	Scotland
3rd place, bronze medalist(s)	France
4	Netherlands
5	West Germany
6	Italy
7	Sweden
8	Wales
9	Spain
10	Belgium
11	Switzerland

== See also ==
- Espirito Santo Trophy – biennial world amateur team golf championship for women organized by the International Golf Federation.
- European Amateur Team Championship – European amateur team golf championship for men organised by the European Golf Association.
