= GUW =

GUW may refer to:

- Atyrau Airport, in Kazakhstan
- Golf Union of Wales
- Gun language
