= 1969 European Ladies' Team Championship =

Golf competition

Tournament information
- Dates: 3–6 July 1969
- Location: Halmstad, Sweden; 56.662264°N 12.749291°E
- Course: Halmstad Golf Club
- Organized by: European Golf Association
- Format: 18 holes stroke play Knock-out match-play

Statistics
- Par: 72
- Field: 15 teams circa 75 players

Champion
- France; Odile Garaialde, Catherine Lacoste, Martine Giraud, Florence du Pasquier Mourgue d'Algue, Brigitte Varangot
- Qualification round: 316 (+28); Final match: 6–1

Location map
- Location in Europe Location in Sweden Location in Halland County

The 1969 European Ladies' Team Championship took place 3–6 July at Halmstad Golf Club in Tylösand, Sweden. It was the sixth women's golf amateur European Ladies' Team Championship.

== Venue ==
The tournament was played at the North course at Halmstad Golf Club in Tylösand, Halmstad Municipality, 9 kilometers west of Halmstad city center in Halland County, Sweden. The club was founded in 1930. Its first 18-hole course was constructed by Rafael Sundblom and approved in 1938. A new course was inaugurated in 1967, when nine new holes were constructed, which together with the last nine holes of the old course formed the new North Course.

== Format ==
All participating teams played one qualification round of stroke-play with up to five players, counted the four best scores for each team.

The eight best teams formed flight A, in knock-out match-play over the next three days. The teams were seeded based on their positions after the stroke play. Each of the four best placed teams were drawn to play the quarter-final against one of the teams in the flight placed in the next four positions. In each match between two nation teams, two 18-hole foursome games and five 18-hole single games were played. Teams were allowed to switch players during the team matches, selecting other players in to the afternoon single matches after the morning foursome matches.

The four teams placed 9–12 in the qualification stroke-play formed Flight B to play similar knock-out play and the four teams placed 13–15 formed Flight C, to meet each other to decide their final positions.

== Teams ==
A record number of 15 nation teams contested the event. Czechoslovakia, Luxemburg and Norway took part for the first time. Each team consisted of a minimum of four players.

Players in the leading teams

Country	Players
England	Sally Barber, Barbara Dixon, Ann Irvin, Kathryn Phillips, Margaret Wenyon
France	Odile Garaialde Semelaigne, Catherine Lacoste, Martine Gajan-Giraud, Florence du Pasquier Mourgue d'Algue, Brigitte Varangot
Ireland	Elaine Bradshaw, Oonagh Heskin Fitzpatrick, M. Coburn Madeley, C. McAuley, Mary McKenna
Italy	L. Benazzo, Isa Goldschmidt Bevione, Bianca Martina, Marina Ragher, L. Rivetti
Scotland	Heather Anderson, Jean Bald, Joan Lawrence, Sandra Needham, Belle Robertson, Joan Smith
Sweden	Liv Forsell, Marianne Bergengren, Birgit Forsman, Louise Johansson Wingård, Christina Nordström, Ann-Katrin Svensson
Wales	Audrey Brown, Elsie Brown, Ann Hughes, Jill Morris Edwards, Christine Phipps, Pat Roberts
West Germany	Barbara Böhm, Marion Petersen, Marietta Gütermann, Horstbrink, Brigitte Mähl

Other participating teams

Country
Belgium
Czechoslovakia
Denmark
Luxembourg
Netherlands
Norway
Spain

== Winners ==
Two-times champion team France won the opening 18-hole competition, with a score of 28 over par 316, 15 strokes ahead of host nation Sweden.

Individual leader in the opening 18-hole stroke-play qualifying competition was Brigitte Varangot, France, with a score of 3-over-par 75, two shots ahead of teammate and 1967 U.S. Women's Open champion Catherine Lacoste, who made her first appearance in the European Ladies' Team Championship. There was no official award for the lowest individual score.

Team France won the championship earning their third title, beating defending champions England in the final 6–1.

== Results ==
Qualification round

Team standings

Place	Country	Score	To par
1	France	316	+28
2	Sweden	331	+43
3	Netherlands	332	+44
4	Belgium	333	+45
T5	Ireland *	335	+47
T5	England	335	+47
7	Wales	336	+48
8	Italy	341	+53
9	Spain	343	+55
10	Scotland	345	+57
11	West Germany	353	+65
12	Norway	359	+71
13	Denmark	363	+75
T14	Luxembourg *	388	+100
T14	Czechoslovakia	388	+100

* Note: In the event of a tie the order was determined by the better non-counting score.

Individual leaders

Place	Player	Country	Score	To par
1	Brigitte Varangot	France	75	+3
2	Catherine Lacoste	France	77	+5
3	Elaine Bradshaw	Ireland	78	+6
4	Liv Forsell	Sweden	79	+7

Note: There was no official award for the lowest individual score.

Flight A

Bracket

Quarter finals
England	5
Sweden	2
Belgium	4
Italy	3
Netherlands	5
Wales	2
France	6
Ireland	1

Semi finals
England	6.5
Belgium	0.5
France	4
Netherlands	3

Final
France	6
England	1
Bronze match
Netherlands	5
Belgium	2

Elimination matches
Sweden	4.5
Italy	2.5
Ireland	5
Wales	2

Match for 5th place
Sweden	4
Ireland	3
Match for 7th place
Italy	4
Wales	3

Final games

France	England
6	1
C. Lacoste / F. du Pasquier Mourgue d'Algue 4 & 3	A. Irvin / S. Barber
M. Gajan Giraud / O. Garaialde 3 & 1	K. Phillips / M. Weynon
Catherine Lacoste 5 & 4	Ann Irvin
Brigitte Varangot	Sally Barber 1 hole
Odile Garaialde 3 & 2	Kathryn Phillips
Florence du P. Mourgue d'Algue 3 & 1	Margaret Weynon
Martine Gajan Giraud	Barbara Dixon

Flight B

Bracket

Elimination matches
West Germany	4
Spain	3
Scotland	6
Norway	1

Match for 9th place
West Germany	4
Scotland	3
Match for 11th place
Spain	6
Norway	1

Flight C

Luxembourg	Czechoslovakia
4	3

Denmark	Czechoslovakia
6	1

Denmark	Luxembourg
.	.

Final standings

Place	Country
1st place, gold medalist(s)	France
2nd place, silver medalist(s)	England
3rd place, bronze medalist(s)	Netherlands
4	Belgium
5	Sweden
6	Ireland
7	Italy
8	Wales
9	West Germany
10	Scotland
11	Spain
12	Norway
13	Denmark
14	Luxembourg
15	Czechoslovakia

== See also ==
- Espirito Santo Trophy – biennial world amateur team golf championship for women organized by the International Golf Federation.
- European Amateur Team Championship – European amateur team golf championship for men organised by the European Golf Association.
