= 1964 Espirito Santo Trophy =

Tournament information
- Dates: 1–4 October
- Location: Saint-Germain-en-Laye, France; 48.91833°N 2.05733°E
- Course: Golf de Saint Germain
- Organized by: French Golf Federation and United States Golf Association
- Format: 72 holes stroke play

Statistics
- Par: 72
- Length: 5,933 yards (5,425 m)
- Field: 25 teams 75 players

Champion
- France; Claudine Cros, Catherine Lacoste, Brigitte Varangot
- 588 (+12)
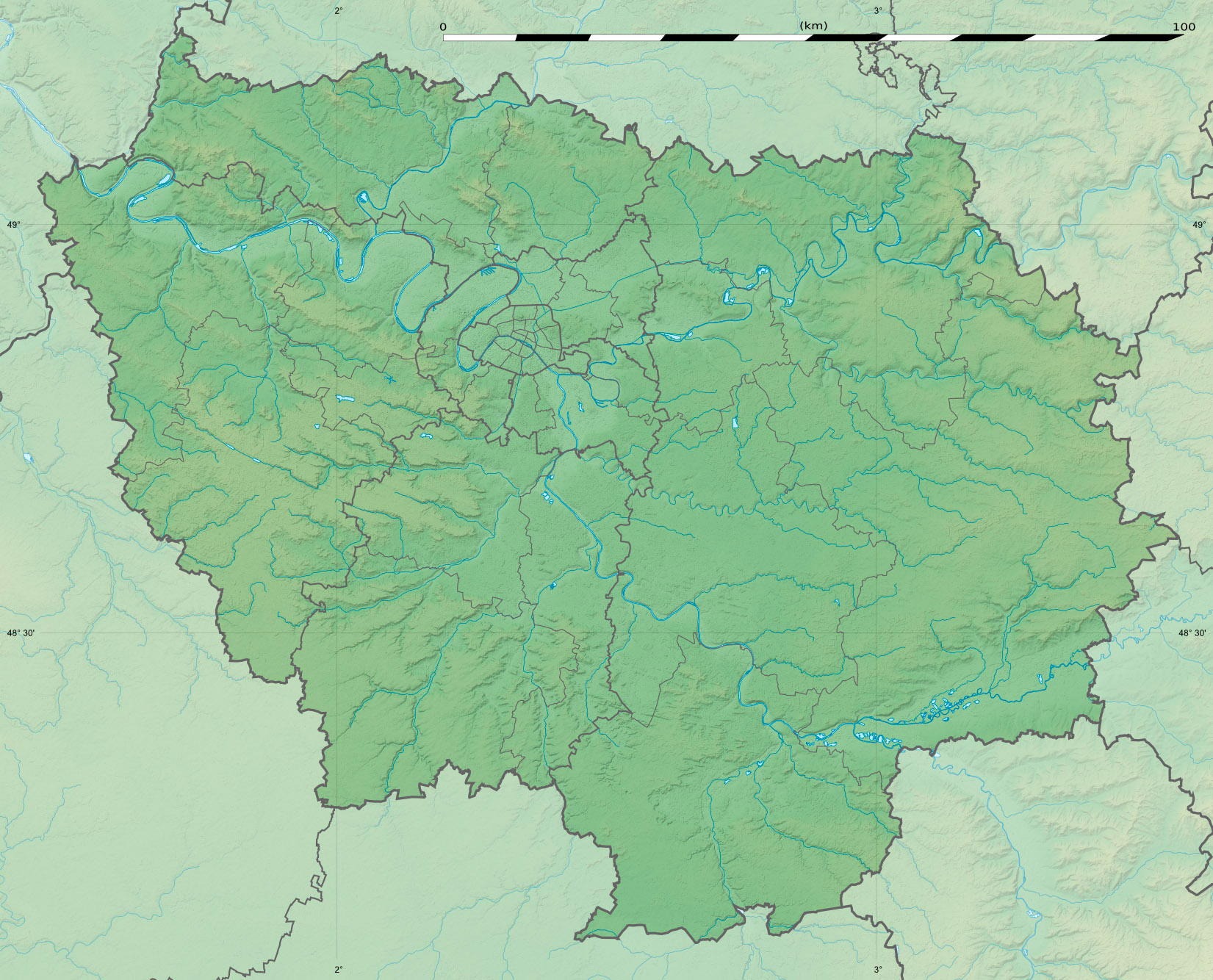
- Location in France Location in Île-de-France

The 1964 Espirito Santo Trophy took place 1–4 October at Golf de Saint Germain in Saint-Germain-en-Laye, west of Paris, France. It was the first women's golf World Amateur Team Championship for the Espirito Santo Trophy. The tournament was a 72-hole stroke play team event with 25 three-woman teams. The best two scores for each round counted towards the team total.

France won the Trophy, beating United States by one stroke. United States took the silver medal while England, a further nine strokes behind, took the bronze.

== Teams ==
25 teams contested the event. Each team had three players.

Country	Players
Argentina	Margarita MacInlay de Maglione, Cecilia Palacio, Adelina J. de Rodriguez
Australia	Gail Corry, Betty Dalgleish, Dianna Thomas
Belgium	Mrs. Jacques Francois, Arlette Engel-Jacquet, Josyane Leysen
Bermuda	Mrs. Brock Park, Mrs. Tom Smith, Mrs. George Wardman
Canada	Betty Stanhope-Cole, Gail Harvey Moore, Joanne Goulet
Chile	Sara Garcia de Raby, Gabriela Gazitua, Maria-Angelica Segovia
Denmark	Bjørg Damm, Vibeke Knudsen, Karin Vang Sigumfeldt Birch
England	Bridget Jackson, Ruth Porter, Marley Spearman
France	Claudine Cros, Catherine Lacoste, Brigitte Varangot
Ireland	Elisabeth Barnett, Ita Burke, Zelie Fallon
Italy	Isa Goldschmidt Bevione, Marina Ragher, Marion Tadini
Japan	Tamako Isutani, Tokusaburo Kosaka, Hiroko Matsunami
Mexico	Fela Chavez, Ana Luisa Hernandez de Ortega, Maria Luisa Martinez
Netherlands	Annie van Lanschot, Anneke van Riemsdijk, Mrs Roely Sauter
New Zealand	Jane Butler, Pat Harrison, Jean Mangan
Philippines	Dominga Capati, Mercedes Feleciano, Nora M. Mateo
Portugal	Barbara de Brito e Cunha, Vera Costa Lennox, Salette de Sousa e Melo
Scotland	Joan Lawrence, Mary Roberts, Belle Robertson
South Africa	Jeanette Burd, Jacqueline Mercer, Mary Clemence
Spain	Rosa Cuito de Serra, Mercedes Etchart de Ártiach, Emma Villacieros de García-Ogara
Sweden	Liv Forsell, Britt Mattsson, Cécilia Perslow
United States	Barbara McIntire, Carol Sorenson, Barbara Fay White
Wales	Mary Oliver, Pat Roberts, Nancy Wright
West Germany	Marietta Gutermann, Monika Möller, Monica Steegmann

== Results ==
Place	Country	Score	To par
1st place, gold medalist(s)	France	147-146-148-147=588	+12
2nd place, silver medalist(s)	United States	148-147-145-149=589	+13
3rd place, bronze medalist(s)	England	148-149-149-151=597	+21
4	Canada	149-156-155-146=606	+30
5	Australia	154-157-152-150=613	+37
T6	New Zealand	154-158-155-149=616	+40
T6	Sweden	156-153-153-154=616	+40
8	West Germany	157-156-152-156=621	+45
9	Mexico	158-160-155-151=624	+48
9	Scotland	158-160-151-155=624	+48
11	Belgium	154-160-158-154=626	+50
12	South Africa	156-158-153-160=627	+51
13	Wales	164-156-156-158=634	+58
14	Ireland	163-160-159-155=637	+61
T15	Netherlands	159-157-166-159=641	+65
T15	Italy	162-158-162-159=641	+65
T15	Philippines	159-164-158-160=641	+65
18	Chile	166-159-159-161=645	+69
19	Japan	168-157-159-165=649	+73
20	Argentina	159-168-164-167=658	+82
21	Spain	169-161-169-164=663	+87
22	Portugal	164-169-163-172=668	+92
23	Denmark	173-181-159-169=682	+106
24	Bermuda	168-170-180-171=689	+113
25	Austria	183-179-180-171=713	+137

== Individual leaders ==
There was no official recognition for the lowest individual scores.

Place	Player	Country	Score	To par
T1	Catherine Lacoste	France	72-71-78-73=294	+6
T1	Carol Sorenson	United States	75-74-72-73=294	+6
T3	Gail Harvey	Canada	73-77-75-72=297	+9
T3	Marley Spearman	England	75-75-72-75=297	+9
T5	Claudine Cros	France	76-75-75-74=300	+12
T5	Barbara Fay White	United States	73-78-73-76=300	+12
7	Brigitte Varangot	France	75-76-73-77=301	+13
T8	Liv Forsell	Sweden	77-75-78-73=303	+15
T8	Dianna Thomas	Australia	75-76-75-77=303	+15
T10	Barbara McIntire	United States	80-73-78-76=307	+19
T10	Ruth Porter	England	80-74-77-76=307	+19
