= Marley Spearman =

English amateur golfer (1928–2011)

Personal information
- Full name: Marley Joan Spearman
- Nationality: England
- Born: 11 January 1928
- Died: 19 August 2011 (aged 83)

Career
- Sport: Golf
- Status: Amateur

Marley Joan Spearman (née Baker, later Harris, 11 January 1928 – 19 August 2011) She won the British Ladies Amateur in 1961 and 1962 and the English Women's Amateur Championship in 1964. She was in three Curtis Cup teams, in 1960, 1962 and 1964.

== Golf career ==
Spearman didn't start playing golf until she was in her early 20s, and first came to prominence in 1953 when reached the fifth round of the English Women's Amateur Championship and the final of the Worplesdon Mixed Foursomes. In 1955 she won the Middlesex title for the first time and played for England in the Women's Home Internationals. She would win the Middlesex championship eight times between 1955 and 1965 and represented England in the home internationals each year in that period. In 1958 she won the Spalding Women's Open Stroke Play at Moor Park, three strokes ahead of Elizabeth Price.

In 1961 Spearman won the British Ladies Amateur beating Diane Robb 7&6 in the final. In the quarter-finals she had only beaten Brigitte Varangot at the 23rd hole. She retained the title in 1962 beating Angela Bonallack by one hole. In 1964 she won the English Women's Amateur Championship beating Mary Everard 6&5 in the final, having beaten Bonallack in the semi-finals. Later in 1964 she won the Astor Prince's Trophy, an event she won again in 1965. In 1965 she also won the Hovis International, six strokes ahead of Ruth Porter. She was also a joint-winner of the Kayser Bondor Foursomes in 1958 and, playing with Varangot, won the Casa Pupo Foursomes in 1965 by 21 strokes.

Spearman was selected for the Curtis Cup team in 1960 but she was not chosen for any matches. The United States regained the cup. She was chosen for the 1962 team in Colorado. The British lost heavily winning just one of the nine 36-hole matches. Spearman lost both her matches. She was selected for the 1964 match at Royal Porthcawl, the first to have 18-hole matches. Playing with Angela Bonallack she won both her foursomes matches. She halved both her singles matches. The contest was much closer that in 1962 with the teams level at the start of the final round of singles matches.

Spearman played in the first two editions of the Commonwealth Trophy, in 1959 in St Andrews and in 1963 in Melbourne. She played in the Vagliano Trophy in 1959 and 1961 and also in 1965 when the Continent of Europe won for the first time. She also played for England in the inaugural Espirito Santo Trophy contest in 1964, where the team finished in third place and Spearman was joint-third in the individual standings. In 1965 she was a member of the English team that won the European Ladies' Team Championship, the first time an English team had entered the event.

== Personal life ==
Spearman was the daughter of a businessman and was brought up in Wimbledon, London. After leaving school she became a dancer in the West End of London. She married Tony Spearman in 1950 and ended her dancing career. It was not until after she was married that she started playing golf. In the late-1960s she was divorced and married Steven Harris.

== Team appearances ==
- Curtis Cup (representing Great Britain & Ireland): 1960, 1962, 1964
- Vagliano Trophy (representing Great Britain & Ireland): 1959 (winners), 1961 (winners), 1965
- Commonwealth Trophy (representing Great Britain): 1959 (winners), 1963 (winners)
- Espirito Santo Trophy (representing England): 1964
- European Ladies' Team Championship (representing England): 1965 (winners)
- Women's Home Internationals (representing England): 1955, 1956, 1957, 1958 (winners), 1959 (winners), 1960 (winners), 1961, 1962, 1963 (winners), 1964 (winners), 1965 (winners)
