= Ann Irvin =

English amateur golfer

Personal information
- Full name: Ann Leslie Irvin
- Nationality: England
- Born: 11 April 1943 (age 83) Lancashire, England

Career
- Sport: Golf
- Status: Amateur

Ann Leslie Irvin MBE (born 11 April 1943) is an English amateur golfer. She won the British Ladies Amateur in 1973 and the English Women's Amateur Championship in 1967 and 1974. She was in four Curtis Cup teams, in 1962, 1968, 1970 and 1976.

== Amateur career ==
Irvin reached the final of the Girls Amateur Championship in 1960 and was a losing semi-finalist in 1961. In those two years she also played in the England–Scotland girls match. Late in 1961 she made her first senior team appearance, playing against the Continent of Europe in Italy in the Vagliano Trophy.

Early in 1962 she was runner-up, playing with Jill Thornhill, in the Kayser Bondor Foursomes. She was also runner-up in the Astor Prince's Trophy in July. In 1962 she was selected for the England team in the Women's Home Internationals, although the team lost to Scotland and finished runners-up. Later in the year she played in the Curtis Cup match in Colorado Springs, Colorado. Irvin played in the foursomes but was not selected for the singles. The team lost by 8 matches to 1. In 1963 she won the French International Lady Juniors Amateur Championship, an under-21 event, and reached the final again in 1964. She also won the 1963 Scottish Girls' Open Stroke-play Championship at Dumfries & County, seven strokes ahead of the runner-up. Liz Chadwick.

In 1965 Irvin was runner-up, playing with Claudine Cros, in the Casa Pupo Foursomes, although 21 strokes behind the winners. In 1966 she tied with Ruth Porter in the Hovis International, after the final round was abandoned.

In 1967 Irvin won the English Women's Amateur Championship, beating Margaret Pickard in the final. In 1968 she won the Avia Foursomes, playing with Ruth Porter, and she also won the Hovis International, this time by 16 strokes from the runners-up. Irvin made her second appearance in the Curtis Cup in 1968, winning three of her four matches and halving the other. The team led after the first day but the United States had the better of the second day and won by 3 points.

Irvin reached the final of the British Ladies Amateur in 1969 but lost by one hole to Catherine Lacoste in the 36-hole final. Later in the year she won the inaugural Ladies' British Open Amateur Stroke Play Championship, 9 strokes ahead of runner-up Dinah Oxley. In 1970 she again won the Hovis International, 5 strokes ahead of Angela Bonallack. In the Curtis Cup in Massachusetts, Irvin lost all her four matches, the United States winning the match by 5 points.

Irvin won the British Ladies Amateur in 1973, beating Mickey Walker in the final. She reached the semi-finals the following year, losing narrowly to Angela Bonallack. Earlier in 1974 she had won the English Women's Amateur Championship for the second time, beating Jill Thornhill in the final. She was selected for the Curtis Cup team but withdrew after injuring her back. Irvin made her final Curtis Cup appearance in 1976. She won her opening foursomes match but lost in the singles and in the second-day foursomes.

Irvin gave up top-level golf in 1977 because of back problems.

== Personal life, awards ==
Irvin was appointed Officer of the Order of the British Empire (MBE) in the 2011 Birthday Honours.

== Amateur wins ==
- 1963 French International Lady Juniors Amateur Championship, Scottish Girls' Open Stroke-play Championship
- 1966 Hovis International (tied with Ruth Porter)
- 1967 English Women's Amateur Championship
- 1968 Avia Foursomes (with Ruth Porter), Hovis International
- 1969 Ladies' British Open Amateur Stroke Play Championship
- 1970 Hovis International
- 1973 British Ladies Amateur
- 1974 English Women's Amateur Championship

== Team appearances ==
- Curtis Cup (representing Great Britain & Ireland): 1962, 1968, 1970, 1976
- Vagliano Trophy (representing Great Britain & Ireland): 1961 (winners), 1963 (winners), 1965, 1967, 1969, 1971 (winners), 1973 (winners), 1975 (winners)
- Commonwealth Trophy (representing Great Britain): 1967 (winners), 1975 (winners)
- Women's International Series (representing Great Britain and Ireland): 1973
- European Ladies' Team Championship (representing England): 1965 (winners), 1967 (winners), 1969, 1971 (winners), 1973 (winners), 1975
- Women's Home Internationals (representing England): 1962, 1963 (winners), 1965 (winners), 1967 (joint winners), 1968 (winners), 1969, 1970 (winners), 1971 (winners), 1972 (winners), 1973 (winners)
- England–Scotland girls match (representing England): 1960 (tie), 1961 (winners)
