= Blanche Duncan =

Welsh golfer

Personal information
- Nationality: Wales
- Born: 7 October 1879 Cardiff, Glamorgan, Wales
- Died: 26 October 1927 (aged 48) London, England

Career
- Sport: Golf
- Status: Amateur

Blanche Duncan (married name Ivor-Jones, 7 October 1879 – 26 October 1927) was a Welsh amateur golfer. She won the Welsh Ladies' Amateur Championship four times in a row from 1906 to 1909 and again in 1912.

== Golf career ==
Duncan won the Welsh Ladies' Amateur Championship five times, in 1906, 1907, 1908, 1909 and 1912, having been the runner-up in the augural event in 1905. In 1905, she lost to Evelyn Young, 2 and 1, in the final. In 1906, she beat Beatrice Storry, 5 and 4, in the final and beat Florence Wenham, Nest Lloyd-Williams and Mary Ellis-Griffith in the final in the following three years She won the title again in 1912, beating Polto Williams in the final.

Duncan represented Wales in the Women's Home Internationals in the first five events that Wales contested, 1907, 1908, 1909, 1910 and 1912. Wales were the weakest team and lost all 15 matches in that period. Players were seeded and she was always in the first three, playing one of the leading players in the other teams. Duncan lost all her matches in 1907 and 1908, but won her final match in 1909, beating Maud Titterton, the Women's Amateur Champion, 2 and 1, although England won the match 7–2. In 1910, she beat Amy Ormsby, the Irish champion. Wales were unable to raise a team in 1911 but competed again in 1912. Duncan won all her three matches, including another win over Maud Titterton, competing as Mrs. Gibb.

== Personal life ==
Duncan was the daughter of John Duncan, later Sir John Duncan of Dros-y-Mor, Penarth. In October 1913, she married Thomas Ivor-Jones. Sir John Duncan was ill at the time and died the following year. She died in London in October 1927, aged 48. Thomas Ivor-Jones died in 1943.

Her brother John Duncan was Welsh amateur champion in 1905 and 1909, while John's wife Margery was Welsh ladies champion in 1922, 1927 and 1928. Their sons Tony and George were also noted amateur golfers.

== Team appearances ==
- Women's Home Internationals (representing Wales): 1907, 1908, 1909, 1910, 1912
