= Susan Armitage =

English amateur golfer

Personal information
- Full name: Susan Armitage
- Nationality: England
- Born: 5 April 1943 (age 83)

Career
- Sport: Golf
- Status: Amateur

Susan Armitage (married name Langridge, born 5 April 1943) is an English amateur golfer. She won the 1962 British Girls' Stroke-play Championship and was in two Curtis Cup teams, in 1964 and 1966.

== Golf career ==
Armitage played in the 1961 England–Scotland girls match at Beaconsfield, winning both her matches. She reached the quarter-finals of the Girls Amateur Championship losing, 3 and 1, to the eventual winner Diane Robb. The following week Armitage won the Midland women's championship at Church Brampton, beating Robb in the final by one hole. In 1962 she won the 54-hole British Girls' Stroke-play Championship at Dalmahoy by a stroke from Elizabeth Barnett. This was the last event before it was taken over by the Scottish Ladies' Golfing Association and renamed the Scottish Girls' Open Stroke-play Championship.

Armitage was twice a quarter-finalist in the British Ladies Amateur, in at Royal County Down in 1963 and at Ganton in 1966. In 1963 she lost, 2 and 1, to Philomena Garvey. In 1966 the event was weather-affected and her quarter-final match against Vivien Saunders was suspended after 23 holes because of bad light, and only completed the following morning, Saunders winning at the 24th hole. Saunders then played her semi-final and the final later the same day. Armitage also reached the semi-finals of the English Women's Amateur Championship in 1963, losing narrowly to Liz Chadwick. In 1965 she won the Midland women's championship for the second time.

In 1964 Armitage was selected for Curtis Cup team at Royal Porthcawl, the first to have two sets of 18-hole matches. She played with Bridget Jackson in both sets of the foursomes matches, losing both matches, but was not selected for either session of singles. The teams were level at the start of the final round of singles matches but the United States won four of the six final-day singles matches. Armitage also played in the 1966 Curtis Cup in Hot Springs, Virginia. She played in all four sessions, playing with Angela Bonallack in the foursomes matches. She lost three of her matches and halved with Anne Quast in the first round of singles matches. Armitage was four up with four to play but lost the last four holes. The Americans won by 13 matches to 5. Armitage also played twice in the Vagliano Trophy, in 1963 and 1965. Armitage made her senior debut for the English team in the Women's Home Internationals in 1963 and played each year until 1966. She also was a member of the winning English team in the 1965 European Ladies' Team Championship.

== Personal life ==
Armitage was the daughter of Norman Armitage of Walsall. In 1967, she married Richard Langridge, an English international golfer. After her marriage she played relatively little top-level golf.

John Richard Langridge (born 9 May 1942) had some success as a junior golfer. He played in the England–Scotland boys match in 1957, 1958 and 1959, and for the combined England and Scotland team in the boys' match against the Continent of Europe in 1958 and 1959. In 1959 he reached the semi-finals of the Boys Amateur Championship. He was tied for fourth place in the 1960 British Youths Open Championship and was third in the event in 1961. He also represented England in the annual youth international against Scotland. He reached the quarter-finals of the 1961 English Amateur and played for the senior England team against France in 1962. Langridge then spent some time in South Africa, during which he won the South African Amateur Championship in late 1963.

== Team appearances ==
- Curtis Cup (representing Great Britain & Ireland): 1964, 1966
- Vagliano Trophy (representing Great Britain & Ireland): 1963 (winners), 1965
- European Ladies' Team Championship (representing England): 1965 (winners)
- Women's Home Internationals (representing England): 1963 (winners), 1964 (winners), 1965 (winners), 1966 (winners)
- England–Scotland girls match (representing England): 1961 (winners)
