= 1970 Espirito Santo Trophy =

Tournament information
- Dates: 30 September – 3 October
- Location: Madrid, Spain; 40.452°N 3.753°W
- Course: R.S.H.E. Club de Campo (Negro Course)
- Organized by: World Amateur Golf Council
- Format: 72 holes stroke play

Statistics
- Par: 73
- Length: 6,221 yards (5,688 m)
- Field: 22 teams 66 players

Champion
- United States; Jane Bastanchury Booth, Cindy Hill, Martha Wilkinson
- 598 (+14)
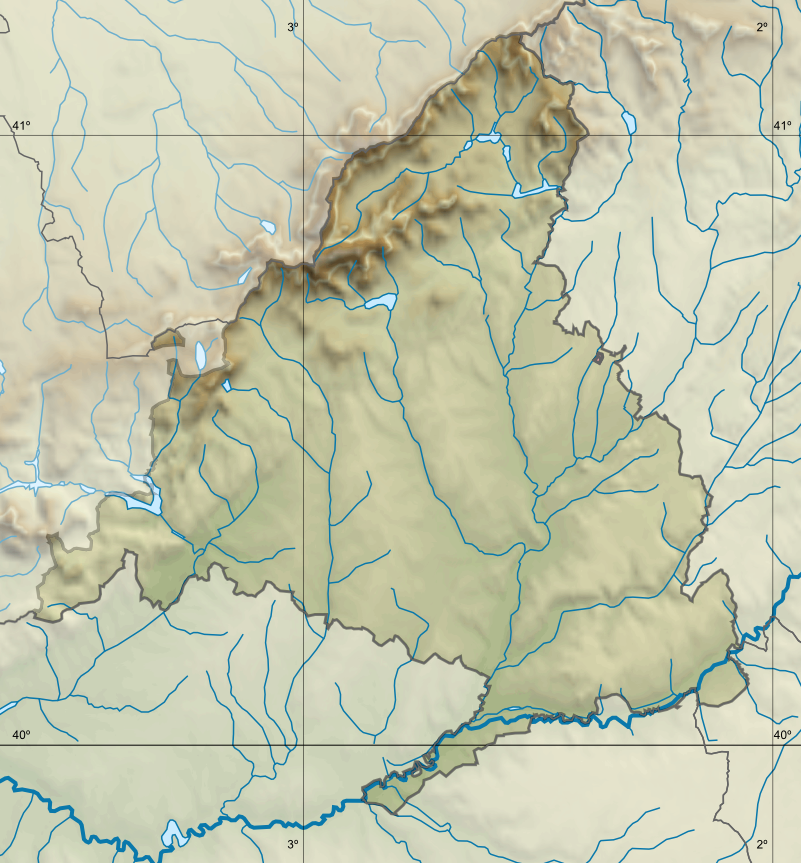
- Location in Spain Location in the Community of Madrid Location in Madrid

The 1970 Espirito Santo Trophy took place 30 September – 3 October at the Negro course at the R.S.H.E. Club de Campo in Madrid, Spain. Several years later, in the late 1970s, the course became home of the Club de Campo Villa de Madrid, while the R.S.H.E Club moved to another location, north of the Madrid city.

It was the fourth women's golf World Amateur Team Championship for the Espirito Santo Trophy. The tournament was a 72-hole stroke play team event with 22 three-woman teams. The best two scores for each round counted towards the team total.

The United States team won the Trophy, defending their title from two years ago and winning their third consecutive title, beating France by one stroke. France took the silver medal while South Africa, seven strokes further behind, for the first time on the podium in the championship, took the bronze.

== Teams ==
22 teams contested the event. Each team had three players.

Country	Players
Argentina	Maria Julia Caserta de Aftalion, Silvia Bertolaccini, Beatriz Rossello
Australia	Robyn N. Dummett, Lindy G. Jennings, Rhys Wright
Belgium	Corinne Reybroeck, Louise van den Berghe, Marie Anne Touissant
Brazil	Yolanda Figueiredo, Elizabeth N. Noranha, Irene Ribeiro
Canada	Joycelyne Bourassa, Gail Harvey Moore, Marlene Stewart Streit
China	Eva Chih-Hua Chang, Yu-Hwa Pan, Ming-Yueh Wu
France	Claudine Cros Rubin, Catherine Lacoste, Brigitte Varangot
(United Kingdom) Great Britain & Ireland	Mary McKenna, Dinah Oxley, Julia Greenhalgh
Italy	Isa Goldschmidt Bevione, Bianca Martini Crotti, Marina Ragher
Japan	Kazuko Kabayashi, Fasako Masui, Masuyo Toyama
Netherlands	Alice Janmaat, Marischka Swane, Joyce de Witt Puyt
New Zealand	Heather Booth, Cushla Sullivan, Glennis Taylor
Norway	Bebban Björge, Vivi Marstrand Horn, Mette Rinde Reuss
Philippines	Mercedes Feliclano, Nora Mateo, Vicky Pertierra
South Africa	Judy Angel, Jeanette Burd, Sally Knight Little
Spain	Condesa de Albox, Emma Villacieros de García-Ogara, Cristina Marsans
Sweden	Liv Forsell, Birgit Forsman, Christina Westerberg
Switzerland	Astrid Bek, Margrit Burki, Jacqueline Stucki
United States	Jane Bastachury Booth, Cindy Hill, Martha Wilkinson
Uruguay	Gladys C. De Bragard, Madelon Paez Vilaro, Rosina F. De Pons
Venezuela	Susana Ortega, Elizabeth Tovar, Doris Wright
West Germany	Marietta Gutermann, Marion Peterson, Katherina Trebitsch

== Results ==
Place	Country	Score	To par
1st place, gold medalist(s)	United States	145-153-149-151=598	+14
2nd place, silver medalist(s)	France	141-150-154-154=599	+15
3rd place, bronze medalist(s)	South Africa	154-152-150-150=606	+22
4	Canada	150-150-153-157=610	+26
5	Argentina	154-154-161-155=624	+40
6	(United Kingdom) Great Britain & Ireland	155-156-157-158=626	+42
7	Australia	151-162-156-160=629	+45
8	West Germany	155-161-153-161=630	+46
T9	Belgium	157-159-151-165=632	+48
T9	Italy	156-161-154-161=632	+48
T9	Sweden	154-163-157-158=632	+48
12	China	155-159-154-165=633	+49
13	Spain	160-161-152-161=634	+50
14	Netherlands	157-166-158-159=640	+56
15	Philippines	159-164-160-159=642	+58
16	New Zealand	160-162-164-167=653	+69
17	Brazil	162-167-165-169=663	+79
18	Japan	173-167-168-162=670	+86
T19	Uruguay	173-159-170-170=672	+88
T19	Switzerland	162-168-173-170=673	+88
21	Norway	169-164-167-176=676	+91
22	Venezuela	176-174-167-180=697	+112

== Individual leaders ==
There was no official recognition for the lowest individual scores.

Place	Player	Country	Score	To par
1	Sally Knight Little	South Africa	76-74-74-75=299	+7
2	Jane Bastachury Booth	United States	73-78-74-77=302	+10
2	Catherine Lacoste	France	74-74-76-78=302	+10
2	Marlene Stewart Streit	Canada	75-73-75-79=302	+10
T5	Claudine Cros Rubin	France	70-76-81-76=303	+11
T5	Martha Wilkinson	United States	79-75-75-74=303	+11
7	Brigitte Varangot	France	71-76-78-79=304	+12
T8	Cindy Hill	United States	72-78-77-78=305	+13
T8	Dinah Oxley	(United Kingdom) Great Britain & Ireland	76-77-75-77=305	+13
T8	Corinne Reybroeck	Belgium	75-77-73-80=305	+13
11	Liv Forsell	Sweden	76-79-75-77=307	+15
