= Brigitte Varangot =

French amateur golfer

Personal information
- Full name: Brigitte Varangot
- Nationality: France
- Born: 1 May 1940 Biarritz, France
- Died: 12 October 2007 (aged 67) Bayonne, France

Career
- Sport: Golf
- Status: Amateur

Brigitte Varangot (1 May 1940 – 12 October 2007) was a French amateur golfer.

== Early life ==
Varangot was born in Biarritz in the French Basque Country and was a self-taught golfer, who did not take many lessons and did not practice a lot. Lally Segard (also known as Vicomtesse de Saint Sauveur) (1921–2018) became her mentor. Varangot and Segard came to win several foursomes tournaments in the 1960s.

Varangot came to represent Golf de Saint Germain, situated 20 kilometers west of Paris, France.

Varangot, age 17, won the 1957 Girls Amateur Championship at North Berwick Golf Club, Scotland, the most prestigious youth golf tournament in Europe. She came close to defending her title, when she reached the final the following year.

Dominating junior golf in France, she won both the French Junior Championship and the French Junior Open Championship for the Trophée Esmond three years in a row 1959–1961.

== Amateur career ==
Varangot's greatest individual victories came at the British Ladies Amateur, one of the two most important amateur tournaments in the world. Despite fighting off an attack of tonsillitis, her first victory came in 1963 at Royal County Down Golf Club, Northern Ireland, coincidentally the same venue were her mentor and friend Lally Segard won the same championship in 1950. Two years later, she won again, this time at St Andrews, Scotland, beating home player Belle Robertson in the final. With Varangot's third victory in the championship at Walton Heath Golf Club in 1968, beating fellow country women Claudine Cros-Rubin on the 20th hole in the final, Varangot is the most recent women to win three times and one of seven players who have won the championship three times or more, since its began in 1893.

Varangot was part of the French team that won the first European Ladies' Team Championship at Cologne, Germany in 1959 and also the teams that won again in 1961 and 1969.

The inaugural world team championship of ladies' amateur golf, named the Espirito Santo Trophy, took place in October 1964 at Varangot's home club Golf de Saint Germain and was planned by Varangot's friend Lally Segard. Segard was also the non-playing captain of the French team, which consisted of Varangot, Catherine Lacoste and Claudine Cros. France won the team tournament by one stroke over the United States team. Varangot finished 7th in the individual competition.

Varangot represented France at the Espirito Santo Trophy on four other occasions and in three of them her team earned one silver medal and two bronze medals.

In 1964, Varangot played an 18-hole exhibition match against American professional Mickey Wright, at Estoril Golf Club, Portugal, for the televised series of golf matches Shell's Wonderful World of Golf, which included many of the greatest stars in professional golf, men and women.

Varangot had a short swing and she was usually playing with a fade. She had a great short game and was especially known for her pitching, chipping and bunker play. On the course, she was often seen with a cigarette in her mouth.

== Death and legacy ==
Varangot died at age 67, on 12 October 2007, in Bayonne, close to her birth place in the Nouvelle-Aquitaine region, in the south-west of France. In her honor, the French Girls Championship under-16 division is named the Trophée Brigitte Varangot.

== Amateur wins ==
- 1957 Girls Amateur Championship
- 1959 French Junior Championship, French International Lady Juniors Amateur Championship, French Ladies Close Championship
- 1960 French Junior Championship, Kayser Bondor Foursomes (with Lally Segard), French International Lady Juniors Amateur Championship
- 1961 French Junior Championship, French International Lady Juniors Amateur Championship, French Ladies Open Amateur Match-play Championship, French Ladies Close Championship
- 1962 French Ladies Open Amateur Match-play Championship, French Ladies Close Championship, Palm Beach Women's Championship (United States)
- 1963 Kayser Bondor Foursomes (with Isa Goldschmid), British Ladies Amateur, French Ladies Close Championship
- 1964 French Ladies Open Amateur Match-play Championship, French International Ladies Amateur Stroke-play Championship
- 1965 Casa Pupo Foursomes (with Marley Spearman), British Ladies Amateur, French Ladies Open Amateur Match-play Championship
- 1966 Avia Foursomes (with Lally Segard), French Ladies Open Amateur Match-play Championship, French Ladies Close Championship
- 1968 British Ladies Amateur
- 1970 Italian Open Amateur Championship, French Ladies Close Championship, French International Ladies Amateur Stroke-play Championship
- 1972 French International Ladies Amateur Stroke-play Championship
- 1973 Avia Foursomes (with Anne Marie Palli, tied with Mickey Walker and Linda Denison-Pender), French Ladies Open Amateur Match-play Championship

== Team appearances ==
Amateur

- Espirito Santo Trophy (representing France): 1964 (winners), 1966, 1968, 1970, 1972, 1974
- European Ladies' Team Championship (representing France): 1959 (winners), 1961 (winners), 1963, 1965, 1967, 1969 (winners), 1971, 1973
- Vagliano Trophy (representing Continent of Europe): 1959, 1961, 1963, 1965 (winners), 1969 (winners), 1971
