= 1966 Espirito Santo Trophy =

Tournament information
- Dates: 20–23 October
- Location: Mexico City, Mexico; 19.278°N 99.159°W
- Course: Mexico City Country Club
- Organized by: World Amateur Golf Council
- Format: 72 holes stroke play

Statistics
- Par: 72
- Length: 6,260 yards (5,720 m)
- Field: 19 teams 57 players

Champion
- United States; Barbara Fay White Boddie, Shelley Hamlin, Anne Quast Welts
- 580 (+4)
- Location in Mexico

The 1966 Espirito Santo Trophy took place 20–23 October at Mexico City Country Club in Mexico City, Mexico. It was the second women's golf World Amateur Team Championship for the Espirito Santo Trophy. The tournament was a 72-hole stroke play team event with 19 three-woman teams. The best two scores for each round counted towards the team total.

The United States won the Trophy, beating Canada by nine strokes. Canada took the silver medal while defending champions France, a further eight strokes behind, took the bronze.

== Teams ==
19 teams contested the event. Each team had three players.

Country	Players
Australia	Gail Corry, Marea Hickey Parsons, Dianna Thomas
Belgium	Arlette Engel-Jacquet, Corinne Reybroeck, Louise van den Berghe
Bermuda	Mrs M.J. Brewer, Mrs. Brock Park, Mrs. Graham Rosser
Brazil	Margot M. Brand, Gitta Grant, Irene Ribeiro
Canada	Gayle Hitchens Borthwick, Gail Harvey Moore, Marlene Stewart Streit
Chile	Raquel R.T. Edwards, Gabriela Gazitua, Violet J. de Vermehren
France	Claudine Cros, Catherine Lacoste, Brigitte Varangot
(United Kingdom) Great Britain & Ireland	Ita Burke, Ruth Porter, Belle Robertson
Italy	Isa Goldschmidt Bevione, Marina Ragher, Marion Tadini
Japan	Tamako Izutani, Takako Kiymoto, Seiko Sato
Mexico	Fela Chavez, Florencia Hernandez, Elena Larralde
Netherlands	A.E. Eschauzier, Annie van Lanschot, Anneke van Riemsdijk
New Zealand	Patricia Bull, Jane Little, Natalie White
South Africa	Judy Angel, Jill Kennedy, Jacqueline Mercer
Spain	Teresa Bagaria, Mercedes Etchart de Ártiach, Emma Villacieros de García-Ogara
Sweden	Liv Forsell, Birgit Forsman, Nina Rehnqvist
United States	Barbara Fay White Boddie, Shelley Hamlin, Anne Quast Welts
Venezuela	Mrs. Hope P. Nestares, Luisa M de Sabater, Margaret Murray-Wilson
West Germany	Monika Möller, Marion Petersen, Monica Steegmann

== Results ==
Place	Country	Score	To par
1st place, gold medalist(s)	United States	145-144-146-145=580	+4
2nd place, silver medalist(s)	Canada	150-148-145-146=589	+13
3rd place, bronze medalist(s)	France	147-150-150-150=597	+21
4	Belgium	150-151-158-152=611	+35
5	(United Kingdom) Great Britain & Ireland	155-155-149-153=612	+36
T6	Italy	146-158-153-156=613	+37
T6	Mexico	157-154-148-154=613	+37
T6	New Zealand	154-153-152-154=613	+37
T6	South Africa	152-150-152-159=613	+37
10	Sweden	154-155-149-159=617	+41
11	Australia	158-150-162-154=621	+45
12	Netherlands	159-150-162-154=625	+49
13	West Germany	159-157-159-156=631	+55
14	Spain	163-161-163-160=647	+71
15	Japan	165-156-168-159=648	+72
16	Brazil	167-164-160-168=659	+83
17	Venezuela	169-180-172-169=690	+114
18	Chile	177-174-182-170=703	+127
19	Bermuda	168-183-183-177=711	+135

== Individual leaders ==
There was no official recognition for the lowest individual scores.

Place	Player	Country	Score	To par
1	Marlene Stewart Streit	Canada	74-71-70-74=289	+1
2	Barbara Fay White Boddie	United States	74-71-74-73=292	+4
3	Catherine Lacoste	France	71-73-70-79=293	+5
T4	Liv Forsell	Sweden	76-73-70-79=298	+10
T4	Anne Quast Welts	United States	71-73-76-79=298	+10
6	Shelley Hamlin	United States	80-75-72-72=299	+11
7	Florencia Hernandez	Mexico	72-77-73-78=300	+12
8	Belle Robertson	(United Kingdom) Great Britain & Ireland	77-77-69-78=301	+13
9	Marina Ragher	Italy	74-78-74-76=302	+14
T10	Gail Harvey Moore	Canada	77-77-78-72=304	+16
T10	Corinne Reybroeck	Belgium	72-75-81-76=304	+16
