= French International Lady Juniors Amateur Championship =

Tournament information
- Location: Paris, France
- Established: 1927
- Course: Golf de Saint-Cloud
- Organised by: Fédération française de golf
- Format: Match play
- Month played: May

Current champion
- (Denmark) Benedicte Brent-Petersen

Location map
- Location in France Location in Europe

The French International Lady Juniors Amateur Championship (French: Internationaux de France Juniors Filles), known also as the Esmond Trophy since 1927, is an annual amateur golf tournament in France for women up to 21.

The match play tournament has been held annually at Golf de Saint-Cloud in Paris since 1927, and in its current form since 1959.

== Winners ==
Year	Champion	Score	Runner-up	Ref
Internationaux de France U21 – Trophée Esmond
2026	(Denmark) Benedicte Brent-Petersen	7&6	(Italy) Natalia Aparicio	
2025	(France) Alice Kong	5&4	(Italy) Guia Vittoria Acutis	
2024	(France) Lily Reitter	2 up	(France) Louise Uma Landgraf	
2023	(Sweden) Meja Örtengren	1 up	(Spain) Andrea Revuelta	
2022	(Denmark) Amalie Leth-Nissen	5&3	(Spain) Paula Martín Sampedro	
2021	(Italy) Francesca Fiorellini	1 up	(Sweden) Meja Örtengren	
2020	No tournament			
2019	(France) Lucie Malchirand	2&1	(France) Pauline Roussin-Bouchard	
2018	(Spain) Marta García Llorca	2&1	(Spain) Dimana Viudes Emilova	
2017	(Sweden) Amanda Linnér	6&5	(Sweden) Beatrice Wallin	
2016	(Belgium) Clarisse Louis	2&1	(Spain) Ana Peláez	
2015	(Spain) Nuria Iturrioz	4&2	(France) Agathe Laisné	
Internationaux de France Juniors Filles – Trophée Esmond
2014	(Italy) Virginia Elena Carta	2&1	(Spain) Celia Barquín Arozamena	
2013	(Germany) Laura Fünfstück	1up	(Spain) Natalia Escuriola	
2012	(France) Céline Boutier	1up	(England) Bronte Law	
2011	(Sweden) Madelene Sagström	5&4	(France) Manon Gidali	
2010	(Republic of Ireland) Leona Maguire	3&2	(Norway) Tonje Daffinrud	
2009	(Republic of Ireland) Leona Maguire	1up	(Czech Republic) Klára Spilková	
2008	(England) Rachel Jennings	2&1	(Spain) Ane Urchegui	
2007	(England) Florentyna Parker	6&5	(Spain) Marta Silva	
2006	(Spain) Carlota Ciganda	1up	(France) Caroline Afonso	
2005	(Spain) Beatriz Recari	3&2	(Sweden) Anna Nordqvist	
2004	(Spain) Elisa Serramia Neundorf	4&3	(Spain) Beatriz Recari	
2003	(Spain) María Hernández	2&1	(France) Sophie Giquel	
2002	(Sweden) Louise Stahle	7&5	(Italy) Margherita Rigon	
2001	(Spain) Emma Cabrera-Bello	5&4	(England) Sarah Heath	
2000	(France) Karine Icher	2&1	(Spain) Tania Elósegui	
1999	(Spain) Tania Elósegui			
1998	(France) Marine Monnet	3&2	(France) Karine Icher	
1997	(England) Rebecca Hudson	5&4	(France) Marine Monnet	
1996	(Spain) Maria-José Pons	2up	(England) Rebecca Hudson	
1995	(Sweden) Karolina Andersson	39th hole	(Sweden) Sara Eklund	
1994	(Spain) Maria-José Pons	8&6	(Spain) Itziar Elguezabal	
1993	(Sweden) Maria Hjorth	39th hole	(France) Stéphanie Dallongeville	
1992	(Spain) Estefania Knuth	8&6	(England) Caroline Hall	
1991	(France) Sandrine Mendiburu	4&3	(Spain) Laura Navarro	
1990	(Spain) Estefania Knuth	3up	(England) Helen Dobson	
1989	(France) Sandrine Mendiburu	7&6	(England) Lisa Walton	
1988	(England) Susan Shapcott	6&5	(Spain) Eva Vilagut	
1987	(Italy) Stefania Croce	7&6	(France) Sandrine Mendiburu	
1986	(Spain) Esther Tamarit	2&1	(Spain) Carmen Alonso	
1985	(England) Trish Johnson	1 up	(Italy) Elena Girardi	
1984	(France) Corinne Soulès	37th hole	(Spain) Xonia Wunsch	
1983	(Sweden) Eva Dahllöf	19th hole	(England) Claire Waite	
1982	(France) Corinne Soulès	2&1	(France) Valérie Pamard	
1981	(Belgium) Isabelle Declercq	5&4	(England) Lynda Moore	
1980	(Switzerland) Regine Lautens	2&1	(France) Corinne Soulès	
1979	(France) Carole Bromet	1 up	(Italy) Sabina Pischiutta	
1978	(France) Marie-Laure de Lorenzi	4&3	(Scotland) Dale Reid	
1977	(Sweden) Charlotte Montgomery	2&1	(France) Éliane Berthet	
1976	(France) Marie-Laure de Lorenzi	3&1	(France) Anne-Marie Palli	
1975	(Switzerland) Carole Charbonnier	3&2	(France) Carole Bromet	
1974	(Italy) Giovanna Foglia	1 up	G. Stevens	
1973	(Italy) Eva Ragher	1 up	(France) Anne-Marie Palli	
1972	(Belgium) Corinne Reybroeck	3&2	(France) Christine Collenot	
1971	(England) Mickey Walker	4&2	(Belgium) Corinne Reybroeck	
1970	(England) Kathryn Phillips	1 up	(England) Linda Denison-Pender	
1969	(England) Dinah Oxley	20th	(England) Kathryn Phillips	
1968	(France) Anita Newman	4&2	(Belgium) Corinne Reybroeck	
1967	(Sweden) Cecilia Perslow	2&1	(England) Shirley Ward	
1966	(France) Catherine Lacoste	7&5	(Sweden) Cecilia Perslow	
1965	(England) Pam Tredinnick	2&1	(Germany) Marion Petersen	
1964	(France) Catherine Lacoste	1 up	(England) Ann Irvin	
1963	(England) Ann Irvin	1 up	(France) Martine Gajan	
1962	(France) Martine Gajan	1 up	(France) Monique de Mouxy	
1961	(France) Brigitte Varangot	4&3	(England) Diane Robb	
1960	(France) Brigitte Varangot	5&4	(France) Monique Chauvot	
1959	(France) Brigitte Varangot	3&2	(England) Tessa Ross Steen	
