= Hovis International =

Tournament information
- Location: United Kingdom
- Established: 1964
- Format: Stroke play
- Final year: 1978

The Hovis International was a women's amateur 72-hole stroke-play event. It was held from 1964 to 1972. The event continued as the Newmark International. Some of the later events were open to professionals.

== Winners ==
Year	Winner	Score	Margin of victory	Runner(s)-up	Venue	Ref.
Newmark-Avia International
1978	(England) Vanessa Marvin	219	1 stroke	(England) Vivien Saunders	Camberley Heath	
Newmark International
1977	(England) Dinah Henson	215	9 strokes	(Wales) Vicki Rawlings	Woodhall Spa	
1976	(England) Jenny Lee-Smith	224	2 strokes	(England) Angela Bonallack (Spain) Ana Monfort de Albox	Woodhall Spa	
1975	(England) Dinah Henson (United States) Carol Semple (South Africa) Alison Sheard	301	Tied		Royal Liverpool	
1974	(England) Jill Thornhill	301	3 strokes	(England) Anne Stant	Walton Heath	
Newmark-Avia International
1973	(England) Carole Redford	293	3 strokes	(England) Mickey Walker	Royal Birkdale	
Hovis International
1972	(England) Mickey Walker	299	9 strokes	(England) Ann Irvin	Porters Park	
1971	(Scotland) Cathie Barclay	223	2 strokes	(England) Mickey Walker (England) Dinah Oxley	Croham Hurst	
1970	(England) Ann Irvin	289	5 strokes	(England) Angela Bonallack	Liphook	
1969	(France) Catherine Lacoste	287	15 strokes	(England) Dinah Oxley	Moor Park	
1968	(England) Ann Irvin	291	16 strokes	(England) Patricia Davie (England) Ann Rampton	Croham Hurst	
1967	(England) Mary Everard	302	7 strokes	(England) Vivien Saunders	Woolaton Park	
1966	(England) Ann Irvin (England) Ruth Porter	224	Tied		Littlestone	
1965	(England) Marley Spearman	304	6 strokes	(England) Ruth Porter	Walton Heath	
1964	(England) Margaret Nichol	314	1 stroke	(England) Ruth Porter	Walton Heath	
