= Catherine Lacoste =

French amateur golfer (born 1945)

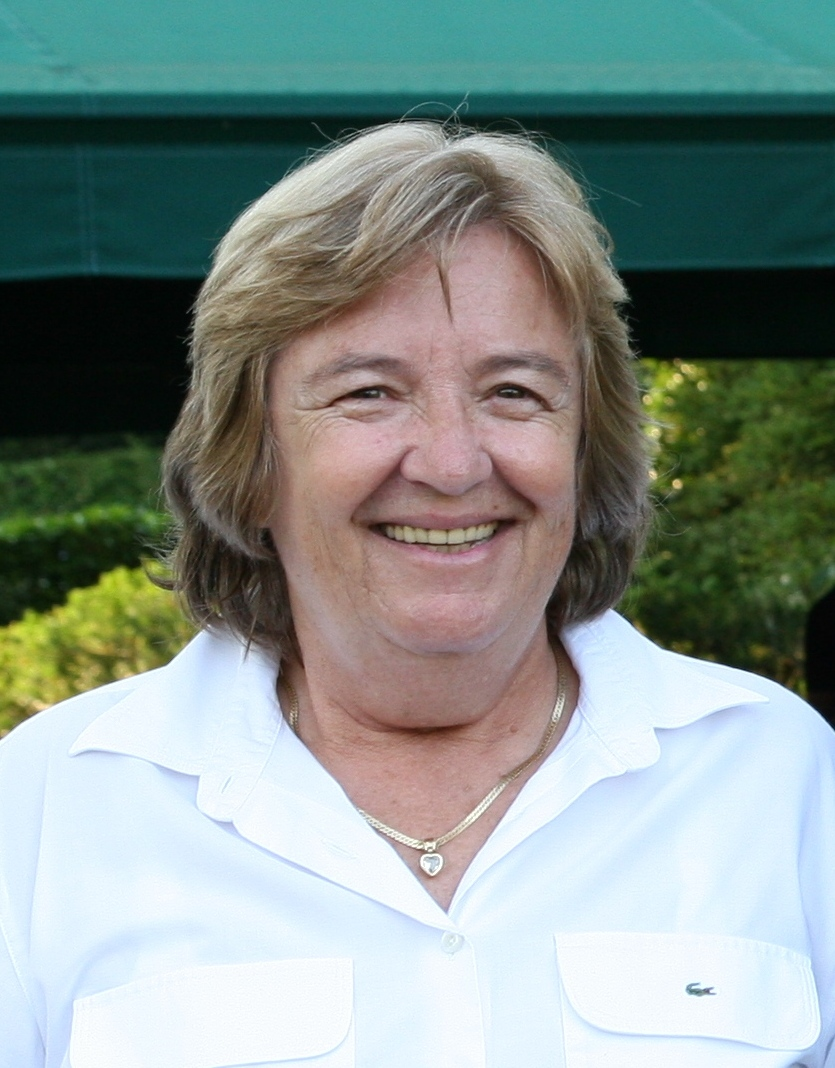

Personal information
- Full name: Catherine Lacoste
- Nickname: Crocodile Kid
- Nationality: France
- Born: 27 June 1945 (age 81) Paris, France
- Spouses: Jaime Prado y Colón de Carvajal (1970–c.1978); Angel Piñero (2000–2022)
- Children: 4

Career
- Sport: Golf
- Status: Amateur

Best results in LPGA major championships (wins: 1)
- U.S. Women's Open: Won: 1967

Catherine Lacoste (born 27 June 1945) is a French amateur golfer. She is the only player who has won the U.S. Women's Open as an amateur.

== Early life ==
In 1945, Lacoste was born in Paris, France. She was raised in the city. She grew up with her parents, René Lacoste and Simone de la Chaume, and three older brothers. Her father was, beside being a world class tennis player (having won seven Grand Slam singles titles), also a 6-handicap golfer. Her mother was a world class golfer, having won several major international amateur championships.

Young Lacoste practised many different sports: skiing, skating, swimming, horse riding, tennis and, from 8 years of age, golf. Her family spent many holidays in the coast resort area of Saint-Jean-de-Luz, in France close to the Spanish border, near the Golf de Chantaco. The club was founded by Lacoste's grandfather René Thion de la Chaume in 1928, as a celebration of the British Ladies Amateur triumph a year earlier by Lacoste's mother.

French golfer Jean Garaïalde and his father Raymond were her golf teachers when she learned the game at a young age. When she was 13 years old, Jean gave her a Golden Goose blade putter that she used through her entire career. Always hitting the long clubs with ease, favoring the 1-iron, she was soon dominating golf tournaments in the region around her club.

At 20 years of age, Lacoste left studies at Sorbonne University after two years, to concentrate on golf.

== Golf career ==
=== Early career ===
In 1964, at age 19, Lacoste was selected to the French three-women team for the first Espirito Santo Trophy, the inaugural world team championship of amateur golf, at Golf de Saint Germain, 20 kilometers west of Paris, France. The French team of Lacoste, Brigitte Varangot and Claudine Cros, under the captaincy of Lally de Saint Sauveur, won the championship and Lacoste finished tied first individually.

The year after, Lacoste was invited to the 1965 U.S. Women's Open at Atlantic City Country Club in New Jersey. She crossed the Atlantic by boat with her parents and finished 14th.

She was part of the Continent of Europe team at the 1965 Vagliano Trophy, winning for the first time over the Great Britain and Ireland team. Lacoste came to be part of the European team repeating that victory in 1967 and 1969, to take three trophies in a row.

At the 1966 Espirito Santo Trophy at Mexico City GC, Mexico, the French team finished bronze-medalists and Lacoste was third individually.

=== 1967 U.S. Open ===
Lacoste decided to skip the 1967 European Ladies' Team Championship to travel to the 1967 U.S. Women's Open, to be played June 29 to July 2 at the Cascades Course of The Homestead, in Hot Springs, Virginia. This time Lacoste traveled by air and alone. On Tuesday of the tournament week, Lacoste celebrated her 22nd birthday. Going into the last round, Lacoste held a 5-stroke lead. It stretched to seven strokes before she bogeyed five straight holes in bad weather on the back nine of the final round, but she secured the victory with a birdie on the par-4 17th hole by hitting a 2-wood over trees to cut the corner of a dogleg, which her competitors were not able to do, to finally win by two strokes. As an amateur, she received no prize money and the first prize of $5,000 was added to the second prize and shared by the tied runners-up Susie Maxwell and Beth Stone. Lacoste's victory came on the same day as her famous father's birthday.

Playing on this occasion – as an amateur – in just her third professional golf tournament, she was the first European and only the second non-U.S.-citizen to win an LPGA major after Fay Crocker of Uruguay (whose father was American), and she remained the only French woman to have done so until Patricia Meunier-Lebouc won the 2003 Kraft Nabisco Championship. Lacoste was the youngest woman ever and remains the only amateur ever to win the U.S. Women's Open. It was also the first win by an amateur on the LPGA Tour.

Trying to defend her U.S. Open title in 1968, she finished tied 13th and never again entered the U.S. Women's Open.

=== Dominating amateur tournaments in late 1960's ===
Lacoste won the 1968 Women's Western Amateur, one of the most prestigious amateur tournaments in the United States. At the 1968 Espirito Santo Trophy at Victoria Golf Club, Melbourne, Australia, Lacoste was again the individual winner and the French team bronze-medalists.

In 1969, Lacoste won the two most important amateur tournaments in the world, the U.S. Women's Amateur and the British Ladies Amateur, becoming the third woman in golfing history to achieve that feat in the same year. Only one other player has done that since. Lacoste and her mother are the only mother and daughter to have both won the British Ladies Amateur. This year Lacoste became the only women to have held the open amateur titles of United States, Great Britain, France and Spain at the same time. The same year, Lacoste made her first appearance at the European Ladies' Team Championship and led the French team to victory.

=== Early retirement from tournament golf ===
At the age of 25, having won several of the most prestigious tournaments in the world, Lacoste retired from tournament golf, except a few appearances in France and Spain, and never turned professional.

The following years, Lacoste continued to play for her country's team at the Espirito Santo Trophy, where she finished second individually in 1970 and in 1976, and the European Ladies' Team Championship, being part of the winning team again in 1975. After her competitive career, she served as a non-playing captain of the French women's senior amateur team.

Since around the age of 65, Lacoste does not play golf at all, due to injuries and surgeries in her knees and shoulders.

== Personal life ==
Lacoste is the daughter of French tennis player René Lacoste (1904–1996), winner of seven Grand Slam singles titles, and his wife Simone de la Chaume (1908–2001), in 1927, first French winner of the British Ladies Amateur. They married in 1930.

She has been a member of the board of Lacoste, the major fashion company, founded in 1933 by her father, who invented the crocodile trademark. The management of the company was transferred in 1963 from her father to her brother Bernard Lacoste (1931–2006). The family sold the company and the brand in November 2012 to Swiss family-held group Maus Frères.

The Chantaco Golf Club has always been managed by a member of the Lacoste family. In 1974, Lacoste succeeded her mother as president, with assistance of her brother François. In 2009, she was replaced by Camille Lacoste, the niece of her parents, until 2013, when Camille was replaced by Lacoste's daughter Veronique Smondack. Lacoste was awarded Honorary President of the club.

In 1970, Lacoste married Jaime Prado y Colón de Carvajal and the couple had four children. Her youngest daughter Veronique played collegiately at Wake Forest University, North Carolina, in 1998. Her second oldest daughter Caroline Devaux, also took up the game.

Until 1978, Lacoste competed under the name Catherine Lacoste de Prado. After divorcing from her first husband, she married Angel Piñero, a classical guitar player, in 2000. Besides living in Saint-Jean-de-Luz, the two of them have a home in Madrid, Spain.

== Amateur wins ==
- 1964 French International Lady Juniors Amateur Championship
- 1965 French International Ladies Amateur Stroke-play Championship
- 1966 Astor Prince's Trophy, French International Lady Juniors Amateur Championship, French International Ladies Amateur Stroke-play Championship
- 1967 Worplesdon Mixed Foursomes (with José Gancedo), French Open Amateur Match-play Championship, French International Ladies Amateur Stroke-play Championship
- 1968 Women's Western Amateur, French Ladies Close Amateur Championship
- 1969 British Ladies Amateur, U.S. Women's Amateur, French Open Amateur Match-play Championship, Hovis International, French Ladies Close Amateur Championship, Spanish International Ladies Amateur Championship
- 1970 French Open Amateur Match-play Championship
- 1972 French Open Amateur Match-play Championship, Spanish International Ladies Amateur Championship
- 1975 French International Ladies Amateur Stroke-play Championship
- 1976 Spanish International Ladies Amateur Championship
- 1984 French International Ladies Amateur Stroke-play Championship

== Professional wins (1) ==
=== LPGA Tour wins (1) ===
Legend
LPGA Tour major championships (1)
Other LPGA Tour (0)

No.	Date	Tournament	Winning score	Margin of victory	Runners-up
1	2 Jul 1967	U.S. Women's Open (as an amateur)	+10 (71-70-74-79=294)	2 strokes	(United States) Susie Maxwell (United States) Beth Stone

== Major championships ==
=== Wins (1) ===
Year	Championship	Winning score	Margin	Runners-up
1967	U.S. Women's Open (as an amateur)	+10 (71-70-74-79=294)	2 strokes	(United States) Susie Maxwell, (United States) Beth Stone

=== Results timeline ===
Tournament	1965	1966	1967	1968
U.S. Women's Open	T14		1 LA	T13

Note: Lacoste only played in the U.S. Women's Open.

Win
Did not play

LA = Low amateur
T = tied

== Team appearances ==
Amateur

- Espirito Santo Trophy (representing France): 1964 (winners, tied individual winner), 1966, 1968 (individual winner), 1970, 1974, 1976, 1978
- Vagliano Trophy (representing Continent of Europe): 1965 (winners), 1967 (winners), 1969 (winners), 1973
- European Ladies' Team Championship (representing France): 1969 (winners), 1975 (winners), 1979
