= Belle Robertson =

Scottish amateur golfer (born 1936)

Belle Robertson MBE
Personal information
- Full name: Isabella Robertson
- Nationality: Scotland
- Born: 11 April 1936 (age 90) Perth, Scotland

Career
- Sport: Golf
- Status: Amateur

Isabella Robertson (née McCorkindale) MBE (born 11 April 1936) is a Scottish golfer who won the British Ladies Amateur in 1981. Robertson represented Great Britain and Ireland in the Curtis Cup as a player on seven occasions and twice as non-playing captain. She was inducted into the Scottish Sports Hall of Fame in 2002.

== Career ==
In 1936, Robertson was born in Perth, Scotland. Robertson learned to play golf at Dunaverty Golf Club in Argyll, Scotland.

She won the British Ladies Amateur title in 1981 at Conwy Golf Club in Carnarvonshire, Wales. Previously she was runner-up three times: in 1959 at Royal Ascot Golf Club, in 1965 at St Andrews, and at Gullane Golf Club in 1970. She won the Scottish Women's Amateur Championship on seven occasions.

Robertson represented Great Britain and Ireland as a player on seven occasions in the Curtis Cup: in 1960, 1966, 1968, 1970, 1972, 1982, and 1986. She was a non-playing captain in 1974 and 1976. On her ninth appearance in the competition, in 1986, she experienced victory for the first time, beating the U.S. team 13–5 at the Prairie Dunes Country Club, Kansas.

== Awards and honors ==
- She has been appointed a Member of the Order of the British Empire for her services to golf.
- Robertson was voted "Women Golfer of the Year" three times.
- In 2002, Robertson was inducted into the Scottish Sports Hall of Fame.
- In 2015, she became one of the first female members of The Royal and Ancient Golf Club of St Andrews.
- In 2018, Robertson was inducted into Scottish Women in Sport Hall of Fame.
- She was voted "Scottish Sportswoman of the Year" four times over the course of her career.

== Amateur wins ==
- 1965 Scottish Women's Amateur Championship
- 1966 Scottish Women's Amateur Championship
- 1971 British Ladies Amateur Stroke Play Championship, Scottish Women's Amateur Championship
- 1972 British Ladies Amateur Stroke Play Championship, Scottish Women's Amateur Championship
- 1973 Helen Holm Scottish Women's Open Stroke Play Championship
- 1978 Helen Holm Scottish Women's Open Stroke Play Championship, Scottish Women's Amateur Championship
- 1980 Scottish Women's Amateur Championship
- 1981 British Ladies Amateur, New Zealand Ladies Amateur
- 1985 British Ladies Amateur Stroke Play Championship
- 1986 Helen Holm Scottish Women's Open Stroke Play Championship, Scottish Women's Amateur Championship

== Team appearances ==
Amateur

- Curtis Cup (representing Great Britain & Ireland): 1960, 1966, 1968, 1970, 1972, 1974 (non-playing captain), 1976 (non-playing captain), 1982, 1986 (winners)
- Vagliano Trophy (representing Great Britain & Ireland): 1959 (winners), 1963 (winners), 1967 (non-playing captain), 1969, 1971 (winners), 1981, 1985 (winners)
- Espirito Santo Trophy (representing Scotland): 1964
- European Ladies' Team Championship (representing Scotland): 1965, 1967, 1969, 1971, 1973, 1981, 1983, 1985
- Espirito Santo Trophy (representing Great Britain & Ireland): 1966, 1968, 1972, 1980, 1982
- Commonwealth Trophy (representing Great Britain): 1971 (winners)
