= Wales Golf =

Governing body of amateur golf in Wales

- Sport: Golf
- Founded: 1924
- Affiliation: The R&A; Ladies' Golf Union
- Headquarters: Catsash, Newport

Official website
- www.walesgolf.org
- (Wales)

Wales Golf is the national governing body of amateur golf in Wales. It is responsible for administration and enforcement of the handicapping and course rating systems for ladies and men in Wales. Wales Golf organise competitions, including the National Championships in Wales, and select and manage all Welsh amateur golf teams. It also makes, maintains and publishes any necessary rules and regulations.

Wales Golf is based at Catsash, Newport.
