= European Ladies' Team Championship =

Amateur golf championship

Tournament information
- Established: 1959
- Course: Various in Europe
- Organized by: European Golf Association
- Format: Team match play

Current champion
- Spain (2026)

The European Ladies' Team Championship is a European amateur team golf championship for women organised by the European Golf Association. The inaugural event was held in 1959.

It was played in odd-numbered years from 1959 to 2007 and has been played annually since 2008 (with the exception of 2012).

== Format ==
Currently, the championship is contested by up to 20 teams, each of 6 players.

The format consists of two rounds of strokeplay, out of which the five lowest scores from each team's six players will count each day. The total addition of the five lowest scores will constitute the team's score and determine the teams qualified for the last three rounds of matchplay. Only teams in contention for a medal will play a match format of two foursomes and five singles, while the other teams will play a one foursome and four singles match format.

== Results ==
Year	Venue	Location	Winner	Runner-up
2026	PGA National Slieve Russell	Ireland	Spain	France
2025	Golf de Chantilly	France	Spain	France
2024	Real Sociedad Hípica Española Club de Campo	Spain	Germany	France
2023	Tawast Golf & Country Club	Finland	Spain	England
2022	Conwy Golf Club	Wales	England	Italy
2021	Royal County Down GC	Northern Ireland	England	Sweden
2020	Upsala GC	Sweden	Sweden	Germany
2019	Is Molas Golf Club	Italy	Sweden	Spain
2018	GC Murhof	Austria	Sweden	France
2017	Montado Golf Resort	Portugal	England	Italy
2016	Oddur GC	Iceland	England	Spain
2015	Helsingør GC	Denmark	France	Switzerland
2014	Diners CUBO Golf Course, Ljubljana	Slovenia	France	Finland
2013	Fulford GC, Yorkshire	England	Spain	Austria
2011	GC Murhof	Austria	Sweden	Spain
2010	La Manga Club	Spain	Sweden	Spain
2009	Bled G&CC	Slovenia	Germany	England
2008	Stenungsund GC	Sweden	Sweden	Netherlands
2007	GC Castelconturbia	Italy	Spain	Sweden
2005	Karlstad GC	Sweden	Spain	England
2003	Frankfurter GC	Germany	Spain	Sweden
2001	Golf de Meis	Spain	Sweden	Spain
1999	Golf de Saint Germain	France	France	England
1997	Nordcenter G&CC	Finland	Sweden	Scotland
1995	Golf Club Milano	Italy	Spain	Scotland
1993	Royal the Hague G&CC	Netherlands	England	Spain
1991	Wentworth Club	England	England	Sweden
1989	Golf de Pals	Spain	France	England
1987	Turnberry	Scotland	Sweden	Wales
1985	Stavanger GC	Norway	England	Italy
1983	Royal Waterloo GC	Belgium	Ireland	England
1981	Troia Resort	Portugal	Sweden	France
1979	Hermitage GC	Ireland	Ireland	Germany
1977	Club de Golf Sotogrande	Spain	England	Spain
1975	Golf de Saint-Cloud	France	France	Spain
1973	Royal Golf Club de Belgique	Belgium	England	France
1971	Ganton GC	England	England	France
1969	Halmstad GC	Sweden	France	England
1967	Penina Golf & Resort	Portugal	England	France
1965	Royal The Hague G & CC	Netherlands	England	Scotland
1963	Rungsted GC	Denmark	Belgium	France
1961	Circolo Golf Villa D'Este	Italy	France	Italy
1959	Golf und Land Club Köln	Germany	France	Italy

== Winning nations' summary ==
Country	Winner	Runner-up
England	12	7
Sweden	10	4
France	8	9
Spain	8	8
Ireland	2	0
Germany	2	2
Belgium	1	0
Italy	0	5
Austria	0	1
Scotland	0	3
Finland	0	1
Netherlands	0	1
Switzerland	0	1
Wales	0	1
Total	43	43

== Winning teams ==
- 2026: Spain: Paula Balanzategui, Balma Dávalos, Cayetana Fernández, Paula Francisco, Paula Martín Sampedro, Andrea Revuelta
- 2025: Spain: Cayetana Fernández, Paula Francisco Llaño, Carolina López-Chacarra, Paula Martín Sampedro, Andrea Revuelta, Rocío Tejedo
- 2024: France: Charlotte Back, Helen Briem, Christin Eisenbeiss, Chiara Horder, Celina Sattelkau, Paula Schulz-Hanssen
- 2023: Spain: Carla Bernat, Cayetana Fernández, Lucia Lopez Ortega, Julia López Ramírez, Carolina López-Chacarra, Carla Tejedo Mulet
- 2022: England: Charlotte Heath, Amelia Williamson, Caley McGinty, Lottie Woad, Rosie Belsham
- 2021: England: Lianna Bailey, Rosie Belsham, Annabell Fuller, Charlotte Heath, Caley McGinty, Emily Toy
- 2020: Sweden: Linn Grant, Ingrid Lindblad, Maja Stark, Beatrice Wallin
- 2019: Sweden: Linn Grant, Frida Kinhult, Sara Kjellker, Ingrid Lindblad, Maja Stark, Beatrice Wallin
- 2018: Sweden: Linn Grant, Frida Kinhult, Sara Kjellker, Amanda Linnér, Maja Stark, Beatrice Wallin
- 2017: England: Lianna Bailey, Gemma Clews, India Clyburn, Alice Hewson, Sophie Lamb, Rochelle Morris
- 2016: England: Emma Allen, Alice Hewson, Bronte Law, Meghan MacLaren, Elisabeth Prior, Olivia Winning
- 2015: France: Shannon Aubert, Mathilda Cappeliez, Justine Dreher, Manon Gidali, Ines Lescudier, Marion Veysseyre
- 2014: France: Shannon Aubert, Alexandra Bonetti, Céline Boutier, Emma Broze, Anaelle Carnet, Justine Dreher
- 2013: Spain: Natalia Escuriola, Camilla Hedberg, Noemí Jiménez, Marta Sanz, Patricia Sanz, Luna Sobrón
- 2011: Sweden: Madelene Sagström, Daniela Holmqvist, Nathalie Månsson, Amanda Sträng, Josephine Janson, Johanna Tillström
- 2010: Sweden: Caroline Hedwall, Camilla Lennarth, Louise Larsson, Jacqueline Hedwall, Nathalie Månsson, Amanda Sträng
- 2009: Germany: Pia Halbig, Thea Hoffmeister, Lara Katzy, Staphanie Kirchmaier, Caroline Masson, Nicola Rössler
- 2008: Sweden: Anna Nordqvist, Caroline Hedwall, Jacqueline Hedwall, Caroline Westrup, Pernilla Lindberg, Camilla Lennarth
- 2007: Spain: Azahara Muñoz, Carlota Ciganda, Emma Cabrera-Bello, Araseli Felgueroso, Carmen Perez-Narbon, Belén Mozo
- 2005: Spain: Emma Cabrera-Bello, Tania Elósegui, María Hernández, Lucia Mar, Belén Mozo, Adriana Zwank
- 2003: Spain: Carmen Alonso, Nuria Clau, Tania Elósegui, María Hernández, Elisia Serramiá, Adriana Zwank
- 2001: Sweden: Kristina Engström, Anna Gertsson, Mikaela Parmlid, Nina Reis, Helena Svensson, Linda Wessberg
- 1999: France: Maitena Alsuguren, Stéphanie Arricau, Virginie Auffret, Karine Icher, Marine Monnet, Gwladys Nocera
- 1997: Sweden: Susanna Berglund, Susanne Gillemo, Marie Hedberg, Ulrica Jidflo, Jessica Lindbergh, Isabelle Rosberg
- 1995: Spain: Alejandra Armas, Sara Beautell, Izlar Elguezabal, Ana Larraneta, Maria José Pons, Ana Belen Sanchez
- 1993: England: Sarah Burnell, Nicola Buxton, Julie Hall, Joanne Morley, Kirsty Speak, Lisa Walton
- 1991: England: Nicola Buxton, Fiona Edmond, Linzi Fletcher, Caroline Hall, Julie Hall, Joanne Morley
- 1989: France: Delphine Bourson, Caroline Bourtayre, Sophie Louapre, Cécilia Mourgue d'Algue, Sandrine Mendiburu, Valérie Pamard
- 1987: Sweden: Helen Alfredsson, Margareta Bjurö, Eva Dahlöf, Sofia Grönberg, Helene Koch, Malin Landehag
- 1985: England: Linda Bayman, Trish Johnson, Susan Moorcraft, Carole Swallow, Jill Thornhill, Claire Waite
- 1983: Ireland: Claire Hourihane, Philomena Wickham, Mary McKenna, Eavan Higgins, Maureen Madill
- 1981: Sweden: Hillevi Hagström, Viveca Hoff, Gisela Linnér, Charlotte Montgomery, Pia Nilsson, Liv Wollin
- 1979: Ireland: Rona Hegarty, Mary Gorry, Susan Gorman, Maureen Madill, Mary McKenna, Claire Nesbitt
- 1977: England: Mary Everard, Julia Greenhalgh, Dinah Henson, Beverly Huke, Vanessa Marvin, Angela Uzielli
- 1975: France: Martine Cochet, Odile Garaialde, Martine Giraud, Catherine Lacoste de Prado, Anne Marie Palli, Marie-Christine Ubald-Bocquet
- 1973: England: Linda Denison-Pender, Mary Everard, Ann Irvin, Carol le Feuvre, Mickey Walker
- 1971: England: Sally Barber, Mary Everard, Julia Greenhalgh, Ann Irvin, Dinah Oxley, Mickey Walker
- 1969: France: Odile Garaialde, Catherine Lacoste, Martine Giraud, Florence du Pasquier Mourgue d'Algue, Brigitte Varangot
- 1967: England: Vivien Saunders, Ann Irvin, Mary Everard, Sarah German, Liz Chadwick
- 1965: England: Ann Irvin, Marley Spearman, Susan Armitage, Ruth Porter, Jill Thornhill
- 1963: Belgium: Juliette de Schutter, Josyane Leysen, J. Vivario, Arlette Engel-Jacquet, Louise Van den Berghe
- 1961: France: Claudine Cros, Martine Gajan, M Mahé, Lally Segard, Brigitte Varangot
- 1959: France: Claudine Cros, Odile Garaialde, Lally Segard, Martine Paul, Brigitte Varangot

== See also ==
- Espirito Santo Trophy – biennial world amateur team golf championship for women organized by the International Golf Federation.
- European Ladies Amateur Championship – individual golf championship organized by the European Golf Association.
- European Amateur Team Championship – amateur team golf championship for men organized by the European Golf Association.
