= Espirito Santo Trophy =

Biennial world amateur team golf championship

The Espirito Santo Trophy (World Women's Amateur Team Championships) is a biennial world amateur team golf championship for women organised by the International Golf Federation.

The inaugural event was held in 1964. It was instituted by the French Golf Federation in an agreement with the United States Golf Association. It was planned by Lally Segard, at the time known as Vicomtesse de Saint Sauveur, from France and Mrs. Henri Prunaret from America. Segard also asked her friends Ricardo and Silvia Espirito Santo, from Portugal, to donate a trophy for the event, which they did. They had originally bought the golden cup, which had belonged to Tsar Nicholas II of Russia, for an international Portuguese event that was not played anymore. The championship was held under the chairmanship of Segard at Golf de Saint Germain outside Paris, France. The week after, the World Amateur Golf Council agreed to manage and sponsor the tournament, beginning in 1966, to be played every second year, and Segard was appointed chairperson of the women's committee of the council. The Council changed its name to the International Golf Federation in 2003.

Later tournaments have featured teams from around 50 ccountries. From 2023, the field has been restricted to 36 teams, qualified through different criteria. It is a stroke play event, in which the best two individual scores in each team count towards the final score.

For the first three decades, the championship was dominated by the United States. Later results have reflected the increasing globalisation of women's golf, with six different winners in six events from 1996 to 2006, and several top two placings by teams from Asia. South Korea won four times from 1996 to 2016.

The equivalent "World Amateur Team Championship" for men is the Eisenhower Trophy.

== Results ==
Year	Venue	Location	Winners	Runners-up	Third place
2025	Tanah Merah Country Club	Tanah Merah, Singapore	United States; Catherine Park; Farah O'Keefe; Megha Ganne	South Korea; Park Seo-jin; Sung A-jin; Oh Soo-min; Spain; Carolina López-Chacarra; Andrea Revuelta; Paula Martín Sampedro	(No bronze awarded - duplicate silvers)
2023	Abu Dhabi Golf Club	Abu Dhabi, UAE	South Korea; Seo Kyo-rim; Lee Hyo-song; Kim Min-sol	Chinese Taipei; Hsin-Chun Liao; Ting-Hsuan Huang; Huai-Chien Hsu	Spain; Julia López; Cayetana Fernández; Carla Bernat
2022	Le Golf National and Golf de Saint-Nom-la-Brèteche	Versailles, France	Sweden; Ingrid Lindblad; Louise Rydqvist; Meja Örtengren	United States; Rachel Heck; Rachel Kuehn; Rose Zhang	Germany; Helen Briem; Alexandra Försterling; Celina Rosa Sattelkau; Japan; Saki Baba; Mizuki Hashimoto; Miku Ueta
2020	Tanah Merah Country Club; Sentosa Golf Club originally Hong Kong Golf Club	Singapore originally Hong Kong	Canceled due to COVID-19 pandemic		
2018	Carton House Golf Club; Montgomerie and O'Meara Courses	Dublin, Ireland	United States; Jennifer Kupcho; Kristen Gillman; Lilia Vu	Japan; Yuka Yasuda; Yuna Nishimura; Yuri Yoshida	South Korea; Ayean Cho; Kwon Seo-yun; Hong Yae-eun
2016	Mayakoba El Camaleón Golf Club; Iberostar Playa Paraiso Golf Club	Riviera Maya, Mexico	South Korea; Choi Hye-jin; Park Min-ji; Park Hyun-kyung	Switzerland; Kim Métraux; Morgane Métraux; Azelia Meichtry	Ireland; Leona Maguire; Olivia Mehaffey; Annabel Wilson
2014	Karuizawa 72 East Golf Club	Karuizawa, Japan	Australia; Minjee Lee; Su-Hyun Oh; Shelly Shin	Canada; Brooke Henderson; Brittany Marchand; Augusta James	Korea; Lee So-young; Choi Hye-jin; Park Gyeol
2012	Gloria Golf Club	Antalya, Turkey	South Korea; Kim Min-sun; Kim Hyo-joo; Baek Kyu-jung	Germany; Nina Holleder; Sophia Popov; Karolin Lampert	Finland; Sanna Nuutinen; Krista Bakker; Noora Tamminen; Australia; Minjee Lee; Whitney Hillier; Breanna Elliott
2010	Buenos Aires Golf Club; Olivos Golf Club	Buenos Aires, Argentina	South Korea; Han Jung-eun; Kim Ji-hee; Kim Hyun-soo	United States; Jessica Korda; Cydney Clanton; Danielle Kang	Sweden; Caroline Hedwall; Camilla Lennarth; Louise Larsson; France; Lucie Andre; Alexandra Bonetti; Manon Gidali
2008	The Grange Golf Club	Adelaide, Australia	Sweden; Caroline Hedwall; Pernilla Lindberg; Anna Nordqvist	Spain; Carlota Ciganda; Belen Mozo; Azahara Muñoz	United States; Amanda Blumenherst; Tiffany Joh; Alison Walshe
2006	De Zalze Golf Club; Stellenbosch Golf Club	Cape Town, South Africa	South Africa; Stacy Bregman; Kelli Shean; Ashleigh Simon	Sweden; Sofie Andersson; Anna Nordqvist; Caroline Westrup	Colombia; Carolina Llano; Mariajo Uribe; Eileen Vargas
2004	Rio Mar Country Club	Río Grande, Puerto Rico	Sweden; Sofie Andersson; Karin Sjödin; Louise Stahle	United States; Paula Creamer; Sarah Huarte; Jane Park; Canada; Lindsay Knowlton; Mary Ann Lapointe; Laura Matthews	(No bronze awarded - duplicate silvers)
2002	Saujana Golf and Country Club	Kuala Lumpur, Malaysia	Australia; Katherine Hull; Vicky Uwland; Lindsey Wright	Thailand; Titiya Plucksataporn; Aree Song Wongluekiet; Naree Song Wongluekiet	Spain; Nuria Clau; Tania Eloseguie; Marta Prieto
2000	Sporting Club Berlin	Bad Saarow, Germany	France; Maïtena Alsuguren; Karine Icher; Virginie Auffret	South Korea; Kim Joo-mi; Ahn Shi-hyun; Shin Hyun-joo	Great Britain & Ireland; Rebecca Hudson; Suzanne O'Brien; Alison Coffey
1998	Prince of Wales Country Club	Santiago, Chile	United States; Kellee Booth; Jenny Chuasiriporn; Brenda Corrie-Kuehn	Italy; Giulia Sergas; Federica Piovano; Sofia Sandolo; Germany; Marina Eberl; Miriam Nagl; Nicole Stillig	(No bronze awarded- duplicate silvers)
1996	Sta. Elena Golf Club	Manila, Philippines	South Korea; Han Hee-won; Kang Soo-yun; Kim Kyung-sook	Italy; Sofia Sandolo; Silvia Cavalleri; Giulia Sergas	United States; Kellee Booth; Brenda Corrie-Kuehn; Kelli Kuehne
1994	Le Golf National (Albatros course)	Versailles, France	United States; Sarah LeBrun Ingram; Carol Semple Thompson; Wendy Ward	South Korea; Mi-Hyun Kim; Kwon Oh-yeon; Pak Se-ri	Sweden; Sofie Eriksson; Maria Hjorth; Anna-Carin Jonasson
1992	Marine Drive Golf Club	Vancouver, British Columbia	Spain; Macarena Campomanes; Estefania Knuth; Laura Navarro	Great Britain & Ireland; Joanne Hockley; Joanne Morley; Catriona Matthew	New Zealand; Lisa Aldridge; Lynnette Brooky; Susan Farron
1990	Russley Golf Club	Christchurch, New Zealand	United States; Vicki Goetze; Pat Hurst; Karen Noble	New Zealand; Lisa Aldridge; Jan Higgins; Annette Stott	Great Britain & Ireland; Julie Hall; Claire Hourihane; Vicki Thomas
1988	Drottningholm Golf Club	Stockholm, Sweden	United States; Anne Sander; Pearl Sinn; Carol Thompson	Sweden; Helen Alfredsson; Helene Andersson; Eva Dahllöf	Great Britain & Ireland; Linda Bayman; Susan Shappcott; Julie Wade
1986	Lagunita Country Club	Caracas, Venezuela	Spain; Macarena Campomanes; Mary Carmen Navarro; Maria Orueta	France; Marie-Laure de Lorenzi; Cécilia Mourgue d'Algue; Valerie Pamard	United States; Kay Cockerill; Kathleen McCarthy; Leslie Shannon
1984	Royal Hong Kong Golf Club	Fanling, Hong Kong	United States; Heather Farr; Deb Richard; Jody Anschutz	France; Cécilia Mourgue d'Algue; Corine Soules; Valerie Pamard	Great Britain & Ireland; Penny Grice; Gillian Stewart; Claire Waite
1982	Geneva Golf Club	Geneva, Switzerland	United States; Kathy Baker; Amy Benz; Juli Inkster	New Zealand; Janice Arnold; Liz Douglas; Brenda Rhodes	Great Britain & Ireland; Jane Connachan; Belle Robertson; Gillian Stewart
1980	Pinehurst Resort (No. 2 Course)	Pinehurst, North Carolina	United States; Juli Inkster; Patti Rizzo; Carol Semple	Australia; Lindy Goggin; Edwina Kennedy; Jane Lock	France; Elaine Berthet; Marie-Laure de Lorenzi; Cécilia Mourgue d'Algue; Spain; Ana Monfort de Albox; Marta Figueras-Dotti; Carmen Maestre de Pellon
1978	Pacific Harbour Golf & Country Club	Suva, Viti Levu, Fiji	Australia; Lindy Goggin; Edwina Kennedy; Jane Lock	Canada; Marilyn Palmer; Cathy Sherk; Stacey West	France; Nathalie Jeanson; Marie-Laure de Lorenzi; Catherine Lacoste
1976	Vilamoura Golf Club	Portimão, Algarve, Portugal	United States; Donna Horton; Nancy Lopez; Debbie Massey	France; Catherine Lacoste; Anne Marie Palli; M. Christine Ubald-Bocquet	Brazil; Laura M. dos Santos; Maria Alice Gonzalez; Elisabeth Noronha
1974	Casa de Campo	La Romana, Dominican Republic	United States; Cindy Hill; Debbie Massey; Carol Semple	Great Britain & Ireland; Julia Greenhalgh; Mary McKenna; Tegwen Perkins; South Africa; Jenny Bruce; Lisle Nel; Alison Sheard	(No bronze awarded - duplicate silvers)
1972	The Hundu Country Club	Buenos Aires, Argentina	United States; Laura Baugh; Jane Bastanchury Booth; Mary Anne Budke	France; Anne Marie Palli; Claudine Cros Rubin; Brigitte Varangot	Sweden; Birgit Forssman; Christina Westerberg; Liv Wollin
1970	Club de Campo	Madrid, Spain	United States; Jane Bastanchury; Cindy Hill; Martha Wilkinson	France; Catherine Lacoste; Claudine Cros Rubin; Brigitte Varangot	South Africa; Judy Angel; Jeanette Joan Burd; Sally Little
1968	Victoria Golf Club	Cheltenham, Victoria, Australia	United States; Jane Bastanchury; Shelley Hamlin; Anne Quast	Australia; Elizabeth Blackmore; Marea Hickey; Dianna Thomas	France; Catherine Lacoste; Claudine Cros Rubin; Brigitte Varangot
1966	Mexico City Golf Club	Mexico City, Mexico	United States; Barbara White Boddie; Shelley Hamlin; Anne Quast	Canada; Gayle Hitchens; Gail Harvey Moore; Marlene Streit	France; Claudine Cros; Catherine Lacoste; Brigitte Varangot
1964	St. Germain Golf Club	Saint-Germain-en-Laye, France	France; Claudine Cros; Catherine Lacoste; Brigitte Varangot	United States; Barbara McIntire; Carol Sorenson; Barbara Fay White	England; Bridget Jackson; Ruth Porter; Marley Spearman

== Medal table by country ==
Rank	Nation	Gold	Silver	Bronze	Total
1	United States	15	4	3	22
2	South Korea	5	3	2	10
3	Sweden	3	2	3	8
4	Australia	3	2	1	6
5	France	2	5	5	12
6	Spain	2	2	3	7
7	South Africa	1	1	1	3
8	Canada	0	4	0	4
9	Great Britain	0	2	5	7
10	Germany	0	2	2	4
11	New Zealand	0	2	1	3
12	Italy	0	2	0	2
13	Japan	0	1	2	3
14	Chinese Taipei	0	1	0	1
14	Switzerland	0	1	0	1
14	Thailand	0	1	0	1
17	Brazil	0	0	1	1
17	Colombia	0	0	1	1
17	England	0	0	1	1
17	Finland	0	0	1	1
17	Ireland	0	0	1	1
Totals (21 entries)		31	35	33	99

The "Great Britain & Ireland" team represented the two separate independent countries of the United Kingdom and the Republic of Ireland from 1966 to 2004. This is the designation of the team which plays the United States in the Curtis Cup. From 2006, England, Scotland, Wales, and Ireland (a combined Republic of Ireland and Northern Ireland team) have competed as separate teams.

== Future sites ==
- 2027 Royal Golf Dar Es Salam, Morocco
