= Diane Bailey =

English amateur golfer

Personal information
- Full name: Diane Jane Bailey
- Nationality: England
- Born: 31 August 1943 (age 83) Wolverhampton, England

Career
- Sport: Golf
- Status: Amateur

Diane Jane Bailey MBE (née Robb, also Frearson, born 31 August 1943) was an English amateur golfer. She had considerable success as a junior winning the 1961 Girls Amateur Championship and the British girls stroke-play title in 1959 and 1961. She played in the 1962 Curtis Cup team before retiring from competitive golf. She made a return in the late 1960s and played in the 1972 Curtis Cup. Later she captained the team, in 1984, 1986 and 1988.

== Golf career ==
In 1957, at the age of 14, Bailey played for England in the annual England–Scotland girls match at North Berwick and reached the quarter-finals of the following Girls Amateur Championship before losing to Ruth Porter. In 1959 she won the British Girls' Stroke-play Championship at Whitecraigs, an under-21 event, by a stroke from Jean Letham.

Bailey had an exceptional season in 1961. In April she reached the final of the French junior championship losing to Brigitte Varangot, three years her senior, in the final. She reached the final of the Ladies' British Open Amateur Championship at Carnoustie, losing 7&6 to Marley Spearman. She had beaten Claudine Cros at the 19th hole in the semi-finals. In August she won the British Girls' Stroke-play Championship for a second time, at Helensburgh, by four strokes from Ann Irvin. Three weeks later she won the Girls Amateur Championship at Beaconsfield beating Jean Roberts 3&2 in the final. In addition she made her debut for Great Britain & Ireland in the Vagliano Trophy and for England in the Women's Home Internationals.

Bailey was selected for the 1962 Curtis Cup in Colorado. The British lost heavily winning just one of the nine 36-hole matches. Bailey was the only British player to win a match, beating Judy Bell 8&7 in the singles. In September 1962 she announced that she was retiring from international and tournament golf.

Bailey made a return to regional events in 1966. In 1968 she returned to national events and was selected for the Espirito Santo Trophy team in Australia. She had some success in 1971 and 1972, In 1971 she reached the final of the Wills Women's Match Play, losing to Dinah Oxley and, with Alan Smith, won the Worplesdon Mixed Foursomes. She also played in the Women's Home Internationals. In early 1972 she won the Avia Foursomes in partnership with Belle Robertson. In November 1971 she was selected for the 1972 Curtis Cup team. She played with Belle Robertson in the foursomes, winning one match and halving the other, but lost to Lancy Smith in her only singles match.

Bailey was the non-playing captain of the Curtis Cup team in 1984, 1986 and 1988, Great Britain & Ireland winning in 1986 and 1988. She was president of the Ladies Golf Union from 2015 to 2017.

== Personal life ==
Bailey was only daughter of William and Doris Robb of Wolverhampton. She married Alastair Frearson in January 1962 and in 1962 was known as Diane Robb Frearson, although later simply Diane Frearson. In 1975 she married John Bailey. She was appointed Member of the Order of the British Empire (MBE) in the 1988 New Year Honours for services to golf.

== Team appearances ==
- Curtis Cup (representing Great Britain & Ireland): 1962, 1972, 1984 (non-playing captain), 1986 (non-playing captain, winners), 1988 (non-playing captain, winners)
- Vagliano Trophy (representing Great Britain & Ireland): 1961 (winners)
- Espirito Santo Trophy (representing Great Britain & Ireland): 1968
- Women's Home Internationals (representing England): 1961, 1962, 1971 (winners)
- England–Scotland girls match (representing England): 1957 (winners), 1958 (winners), 1959 (winners), 1960 (tie), 1961 (winners)
