= Jean Donald =

Scottish golfer (1921–1984)

Personal information
- Full name: Jean Macalister Donald
- Nationality: Scotland
- Born: 2 May 1921 North Berwick, Scotland
- Died: 16 May 1984 (aged 63) Gullane, Scotland
- Spouse: John Kenneth Anderson (m. 1958)

Career
- Sport: Golf
- Turned professional: 1954

Jean Macalister Donald (married name Anderson; 2 May 1921 – 16 May 1984) was a Scottish golfer. She won the Scottish Women's Amateur Championship three times and played in the Curtis Cup in 1948, 1950 and 1952. She turned professional at the start of 1954 following a change in the rules regarding amateur status.

== Early life ==
Donald and her twin sister, Anne, were born in North Berwick on 2 May 1921, the daughter of Douglas Donald, a medical doctor. She joined North Berwick Ladies Club in 1936.

== Amateur career ==
Donald had some success before World War II. In 1938, she played in the England–Scotland girls match and then reached the semi-finals of the Girls Amateur Championship at Stoke Poges, losing to Sheila Stroyan. In 1939 she reached the final of the East of Scotland Championship, reached the last-8 of the Scottish Women's Amateur Championship, and, playing off a handicap of 5, won the Ladies' Open Highland tournament at Pitlochry.

Donald reached the semi-finals of the 1946 Women's Amateur Championship at Hunstanton, losing 3&2 to the eventual winner, Jean Hetherington. At the start of 1947 Donald won the East of Scotland title and then won the Scottish Women's Amateur Championship, beating Jean Kerr in the final. In early June, she played in the Women's Home Internationals for the first time, Scotland retaining the title they had held since 1939. The following week she again reached the semi-finals of the Women's Amateur Championship at Gullane, losing 7&5 to Babe Zaharias.

In late June she was part of the winning British team for the Vagliano Trophy in Paris and then won the French Ladies Open Championship the following week.

The early part of 1948 was dominated by the Curtis Cup at Royal Birkdale. Donald was selected for the team after a series of trials. The American side won the match comfortably, winning 6 matches to 2 with one match halved. Donald won both her foursomes and singles matches. Donald reached the final of the Women's Amateur Championship at Royal Lytham & St Annes, losing by 1 hole to Louise Suggs in the 36-hole final. Donald suffered a rare defeat to a British golfer when she lost at the last-32 stage of the Scottish Women's Amateur Championship, losing by 1 hole to Moira Paterson.

In 1949 Donald won the East of Scotland title for the third successive year and won the Scottish Women's Amateur Championship for the second time, beating Helen Holm 6&5 in the final. However, she lost in the first round of the Women's Amateur Championship to Clarrie Reddan at the 19th hole. Donald played in the 1950 Curtis Cup at the Country Club of Buffalo. The Americans won 7 matches to 1, with one match halved, Donald losing both her matches. The team later played a Canadian team, Donald winning both her matches in an 8–2 victory.

Playing with Tom Haliburton, Donald won the 1951 Sunningdale Foursomes. She reached the final of the East of Scotland Championship, losing 7&6 to Marjorie Peel, and lost in the semi-final of both the Women's Amateur Championship and the Scottish Women's Amateur Championship, losing 3&1 to Frances Stephens in the Women's Amateur, and at the 19th hole to Moira Paterson in the Scottish Championship, having been three up with four holes to play. In late 1951 Donald was part of a team of five women that toured South Africa, playing three unofficial test matches.

In 1952, Donald won the Scottish Women's Amateur Championship for the third time, beating Marjorie Peel 13&11 in the final at Gullane. She had already been selected for the Curtis Cup team at Muirfield. The British team took a 2–1 lead on the first day, Donald winning her foursomes match. The singles matches were tied 3–3, to give Britain their first Curtis Cup win. Playing in the first singles match, Donald lost by one hole to Dorothy Kirby. In the Women's Amateur Championship Donald lost in the second round, by one hole to Claire Doran, one of the American Curtis Cup team.

In 1953 Donald and Tom Haliburton won the Sunningdale Foursomes for the second time in three years. The following month she won the East of Scotland Championship for the fourth time, beating Helen Burton 7&6 in the 18-hole final. It was her 7th appearance in the final in 8 years. In May she reached final of the Scottish Women's Amateur Championship but lost 8&7 to Jessie Valentine in the 36-hole final. Donald lost to Marlene Stewart by one hole in the semi-final of the Women's Amateur Championship. Stewart was a member of the Canadian team that was playing in Europe in 1953. The following week Donald was part of the British team that won the Commonwealth tournament at Formby. The other teams were Canada, New Zealand and a British juniors team. The Canadians also played a match against Scotland, Donald winning both her matches. In July she also competed in the Sunday Graphic 72-hole stroke-play tournament at Sunningdale. She led after the opening two rounds and finished tied with Frances Stephens on 315. Stephens took the cup because of her better second-day score. In October she played for Britain against Belgium and France.

From 1947 to 1953 Donald played in every important team match for Britain and Scotland. She played in all seven Women's Home Internationals, being on the winning side four times. As well as playing in three Curtis Cup matches, she played in the Vagliano Trophy against France five times and against Belgium three times.

== Professional career ==
Donald turned professional at the start of 1954 following a change in the rules relating to amateur status. She was employed as an advisor by Dunlop which conflicted with the new rules. Turning professional severely limited her playing opportunities, since there were few events open to professional women. In 1954 she won the Spalding Women's Open Stroke Play tournament at Walton Heath. Playing with Peter Alliss, she won the Sunningdale Foursomes in 1958 and 1961. She won the Kayser Bondor Foursomes in 1959 and 1962. She was partnered by Jessie Valentine in 1959 and by Bridget Jackson in 1962. In 1955 she toured New Zealand and Australia.

== Personal life ==
Donald married John Kenneth Anderson in 1958. She died suddenly on 16 May 1984, aged 63.

== Team appearances ==
Amateur

- Curtis Cup (representing Great Britain & Ireland): 1948, 1950, 1952 (winners)
- Canada–Great Britain match (representing Great Britain & Ireland): 1950 (winners)
- Commonwealth tournament (representing Great Britain & Ireland): 1953 (winners)
- Vagliano Trophy (representing Great Britain & Ireland): 1947 (winners), 1948 (winners), 1949 (winners), 1951 (winners), 1953 (winners)
- Belgium–Great Britain match (representing Great Britain & Ireland): 1949 (winners), 1951 (winners), 1953 (winners)
- England–Scotland girls match (representing Scotland): 1938 (winners)
- Women's Home Internationals (representing Scotland): 1947 (winners), 1948, 1949, 1950 (winners), 1951 (winners), 1952 (winners), 1953
- Scotland–Canada match (representing Scotland): 1953 (winners)
