= Joan Lawrence (golfer) =

Scottish amateur golfer (1930–2020)

Personal information
- Full name: Joan Barrie Lawrence
- Nationality: Scotland
- Born: 1 April 1930 Cupar, Scotland
- Died: 26 March 2020 (aged 89) Dunfermline, Scotland

Career
- Sport: Golf
- Status: Amateur

Joan Barrie Lawrence, MBE (20 April 1930 – 26 March 2020) was a Scottish amateur golfer. She won the Scottish Women's Amateur Championship in 1962, 1963 and 1964 and was a member of the 1964 Curtis Cup team.

== Golf career ==
In 1949, the Girls Amateur Championship was played at Beaconsfield Golf Club, the first time it has been held since 1938. Lawrence played for Scotland in the England–Scotland girls match that preceded the championship and reached the semi-finals, losing to Arlette Jacquet, from Belgium.

Lawrence won the Scottish Women's Amateur Championship three years in a row from 1962 to 1964, beating Marjorie Draper, Belle Robertson and Ansley Reid. In 1965 she again reached the final but lost to Belle Robertson.

Lawrence played in the 1964 Curtis Cup match at Royal Porthcawl Golf Club. She was not selected for either of the foursomes session but played in both singles sessions, losing both matches. She also played for Britain in the Vagliano Trophy in 1963 and 1965. Lawrence played in the Women's Home Internationals each year from 1959 to 1970. She also played for Scotland in the 1964 Espirito Santo Trophy and in the European Ladies' Team Championship in 1965, 1967, 1969 and 1971.

Later Lawrence was an administrator and selector and was the Chairman of Selectors from 1986 to 1988. She was also Chairman of the Ladies' Golf Union from 1989 to 1990.

== Honours ==
Lawrence was appointed a Member of the Order of the British Empire (MBE) for services to Ladies' amateur golf in the 1999 Birthday Honours.

== Death ==
Lawrence died on 26 March 2020, aged 89.

== Team appearances ==
- Curtis Cup (representing Great Britain & Ireland): 1964
- Vagliano Trophy (representing Great Britain & Ireland): 1963 (winners), 1965
- Espirito Santo Trophy (representing Scotland): 1964
- European Ladies' Team Championship (representing Scotland): 1965, 1967, 1969, 1971
- Women's Home Internationals (representing Scotland): 1959, 1960, 1961 (winners), 1962 (winners), 1963, 1964, 1965, 1966, 1967 (joint winners), 1968, 1969 (winners), 1970
- England–Scotland girls match (representing Scotland): 1949
