= Sheila Vaughan =

English amateur golfer (1942–2022)

Personal information
- Full name: Sheila Mary Vaughan
- Nationality: England
- Born: 9 March 1942 Lancashire, England
- Died: 23 April 2022 (aged 80)

Career
- Sport: Golf
- Status: Amateur

Sheila Mary Vaughan (later Irving and Maher, 9 March 1942 – 23 April 2022) was an English amateur golfer. She had a successful junior career and won the Girls Amateur Championship in 1959. She had some success at the senior level in early 1960s, twice reaching the semi-finals of the English Women's Amateur Championship. She played in the Curtis Cup twice, in 1962 and 1964.

== Golf career ==
In 1955, Vaughan, aged 13, reached the semi-finals of the Girls Amateur Championship at Beaconsfield, losing to Alison Gardner. She reached the semi-finals again in 1957 at North Berwick, losing to Brigitte Varangot, and reached the quarter-finals in 1956 and 1958. In 1959 at Woolaton Park, she won the championship, beating Julia Greenhalgh in the final by one hole. She represented England in the annual England–Scotland girls match each year from 1956 to 1959.

In 1960 Vaughan made her debut for England in the Women's Home Internationals and for Great Britain & Ireland in the 1961 Vagliano Trophy. She reached the semi-finals of the English Women's Amateur Championship in 1962 and 1963, losing to Angela Bonallack both times, by the same score 2&1. Vaughan was selected for the 1962 Curtis Cup in Colorado. The British lost heavily winning just one of the nine 36-hole matches. Vaughan lost both her matches. In 1963, she played In the Commonwealth Trophy in Australia, which the British team won. During the trip she won the New Zealand Junior Ladies’ Stroke Play Championship. Vaughan was selected for the 1964 Curtis Cup at Royal Porthcawl, the first to have 18-hole matches. She was only chosen for the foursomes matches. playing with Ruth Porter. They won their match on the first day and halved on the final day. The contest was much closer that in 1962 with the teams level at the start of the final round of singles matches.

== Personal life ==
Vaughan married Dr. Anthony Irving in September 1964 and Joe Maher in March 1971. She was a radiographer by profession.

== Team appearances ==
- Curtis Cup (representing Great Britain & Ireland): 1962, 1964
- Vagliano Trophy (representing Great Britain & Ireland): 1961 (winners), 1965
- Commonwealth Trophy (representing Great Britain): 1963 (winners)
- Women's Home Internationals (representing England): 1960 (winners), 1961, 1962, 1963 (winners), 1964 (winners)
- England–Scotland girls match (representing England): 1956 (winners), 1957 (winners), 1958 (winners), 1959 (winners)
