= Molly Graham =

Scottish amateur golfer

Personal information
- Full name: Mary Allan Graham
- Nationality: Scotland
- Born: 9 February 1880 Liverpool, England
- Died: 13 July 1950 (aged 70) Conway, Wales

Career
- Sport: Golf
- Status: Amateur

Mary Allan Graham (9 February 1880 – 13 July 1950) was an amateur golfer. She won the Women's Amateur Championship at Aberdovey in 1901 and the Scottish Women's Amateur Championship in 1904. Born in England to Scottish parents, she represented Scotland in international competitions.

== Golf career ==
The 1901 Women's Amateur Championship was played at Aberdovey in Wales. Graham beat Rhona Adair, the defending champion, 3&2 in the final to win the championship. Adair had won the Irish Women's Amateur Close Championship two weeks previously. In her semi-final match against Sophie Stubbs, the referee had originally declared Stubbs the winner because of a mistake he had made in scoring the eighth hole. Graham appealed and then won the match at the 19th hole.

Graham played for Scotland in the Women's internationals at Deal in 1902. On the first day, England beat Ireland and Ireland beat Scotland. The following day England beat Scotland 8–0 with two matches halved. Graham halved both her matches, against Rhona Adair and Bertha Thompson.

The first Scottish Women's Amateur Championship was held in 1903. It was organised by the St Rule Club and played on the Old Course at St Andrews. Graham met Alexa Glover in the final. The match was level after 17 holes but Glover won the 18th to win the match.

In 1904, before the Women's Amateur Championship at Troon, a triangular series of internationals were arranged. England beat Scotland 5–4, Ireland beat England 6–3 and Scotland beat Ireland 7–2, one match being halved in each contest. The first two matches were played at Troon, the third at Prestwick. Graham lost to Elinor Nevile but beat Florence Walker-Leigh. In the championship, Graham reached the semi-finals, losing 4&2 to May Hezlet. The Scottish Women's Amateur Championship was held the following week at Prestwick, St Nicholas. On the final day, Graham won her semi-final and the final comfortably to win the title.

The first official Women's Home Internationals were played at Cromer in 1905. Scotland beat both England and Ireland to win the title. Wales did not complete. Graham beat Lottie Dod but lost to May Hezlet. The day before the Home Internationals an informal match was played between a team of American ladies and a team of British ladies. Graham played for the British team, winning her match against Mary Adams. The 1905 Scottish Women's Amateur Championship was the first one organised by the Scottish Ladies' Golfing Association and was held at North Berwick Golf Club. Graham reached final for the third year in a row, but lost at the 19th hole to Dorothy Campbell.

Graham again played in the Women's Home Internationals in 1906 at Burnham. Scotland retained the title by winning both their matches. Graham lost her two matches, to Elinor Nevile and Florence Hezlet.

== Personal life ==
Graham was born in February 1880 in Liverpool, the daughter of John and Mary Gilkison Graham. Her brothers John and Allan also became noted golfers. Graham died in Conway, Wales in July 1950, aged 70. She was unmarried.

== Team appearances ==
- Women's Home Internationals (representing Scotland): 1902, 1904, 1905 (winners), 1906 (winners)
