= Scottish Women's Amateur Championship =

Scottish Women’s Amateur Championship
Tournament information
- Location: Scotland
- Established: 1903
- Organised by: Scottish Golf
- Format: Match play

Current champion
- Susan Woodhouse

The Scottish Women’s Amateur Championship is the women's national amateur match play golf championship of Scotland. It was first played in 1903 and is currently organised by Scottish Golf.

The Scottish Women's Amateur Championship is contested through two phases. It begins with a 36 hole stroke play competition, with the leading competitors progressing to the knock-out match play competition.

== History ==
The first championship was held in 1903. It was organised by the St Rule Club and played on the Old Course at St Andrews. With 46 ladies entering, there were six rounds of match-play, held over four days from 16 to 19 June, the semi-finals and final being played on separate days. It was won by Alexa Glover who beat Molly Graham by one hole. In late 1903 it was decided to hold the 1904 championship at Prestwick, St Nicholas. It was held over three days in May with the semi-final and final played on the same day and was won by Molly Graham. Following the 1904 event, the Scottish Ladies' Golfing Association was formed to run the event. The 1905 was the first organised by the association and was held at North Berwick Golf Club in June. It was won by Dorothy Campbell who beat defending championship Graham in the final, at the 19th hole.

The championship was not held from 1915 to 1919 but resumed at Cruden Bay in 1920. Charlotte Watson beat Lena Scroggie 5&3 in the final. A Scottish Ladies Victory Tournament had been held in October 1919 on the Old Course at St Andrews. Ida Kyle won the event, beating Scroggie 3&2 in the final.

The championship was not held from 1940 to 1946. In 1951 the final was extended to 36 holes, the championship being won by Jessie Valentine who beat Moira Paterson in the final. The following year, Jean Donald beat Marjorie Peel in the final by a record score, 13&11.

The format was revised in 1971 at Royal Dornoch. A 36-hole qualifying stage was introduced with the leading 64 players playing in the match-play stage. The final was reduced to 18 holes. Belle Robertson led the qualifying by 7 strokes and she went on to win the title, beating Marjory Ferguson 3&2 in the final. In 1972 at Machrihanish, Robertson led the qualifying stage by 14 strokes and regained the title with a 5&3 win over Connie Lugton in the final. The format was revised in 1973 on the Old Course at St Andrews, with the number of qualifiers reduced to 32. A new trophy, the Clark Rosebowl was introduced for the next 32 qualifiers. Robertson did not defend her title and the championship was won by Janette Wright who beat Aileen Wilson by two holes in the final.

In 2015 the Scottish Ladies' Golfing Association merged with the Scottish Golf Union to form Scottish Golf, which now runs the championship. From 2019 the number of qualifiers was reduced to 16, the event being reduced to three days.

== Winners ==
Year	Winner	Score	Runner-up	Venue	Ref
2025	Susan Woodhouse	1 up	Freya Russell	Western Gailes	
2024	Lorna McClymont	5 & 3	Freya Russell	Nairn Dunbar	
2023	Carmen Griffiths	6 & 5	Rachael Livingstone	Ladybank	
2022	Cameron Neilson	19 holes	Lorna McClymont	Trump International	
2021	Chloe Goadby	4 & 3	Tara Mactaggart	Gullane	
2020	Not held				
2019	Kimberley Beveridge	1 up	Chloe Goadby	Kilmarnock (Barassie)	
2018	Gemma Batty	1 up	Gabrielle Macdonald	Elie	
2017	Connie Jaffrey	2 up	Clara Young	Royal Aberdeen	
2016	Ailsa Summers	2 & 1	Gabrielle Macdonald	West Kilbride	
2015	Clara Young	1 up	Rachel Walker	Monifieth	
2014	Gabrielle Macdonald	19 holes	Connie Jaffrey	Prestwick	
2013	Alyson McKechin	3 & 2	Clara Young	Longniddry	
2012	Laura Murray	2 up	Jane Turner	Tain	
2011	Louise Kenney	5 & 4	Eilidh Briggs	Machrihanish	
2010	Kelsey MacDonald	5 & 3	Louise Kenney	Craigielaw	
2009	Megan Briggs	4 & 3	Louise Kenney	Southerness	
2008	Michele Thomson	2 & 1	Jo Carthew	Moray	
2007	Jenna Wilson	2 & 1	Emily Ogilvy	Kilmarnock (Barassie)	
2006	Martine Pow	2 & 1	Anne Laing	Dunbar	
2005	Fiona Lockhart	3 & 2	Anne Laing	Cruden Bay	
2004	Anne Laing (3)	2 up	Clare Queen	Prestwick Golf Links	
2003	Anne Laing (2)	4 & 3	Claire Hargan	Old Course, St Andrews	
2002	Heather Stirling	3 & 1	Anne Laing	Stranraer	
2001	Linzi Morton	6 & 4	Lesley Mackay	Carnoustie	
2000	Lynn Kenny	1 up	Heather Stirling	Machrihanish	
1999	Jayne Smith	2 & 1	Anne Laing	Nairn Dunbar	
1998	Elaine Moffat	4 & 3	Caroline Agnew	North Berwick	
1997	Alison Rose	3 & 2	Hilary Monaghan	West Kilbride	
1996	Anne Laing	1 up	Alison Rose	Royal Dornoch	
1995	Hilary Monaghan	21 holes	Sharon McMaster	Portpatrick (Dunskey)	
1994	Catriona Matthew (3)	1 up	Valerie Melvin	Gullane	
1993	Catriona Lambert (2)	5 & 4	Mhairi McKay	Prestwick St Nicholas	
1992	Janice Moodie	2 & 1	Elaine Farquharson	Royal Aberdeen	
1991	Catriona Lambert	3 & 2	Fiona Anderson	Carnoustie	
1990	Elaine Farquharson	3 & 2	Shirley Huggan	Machrihanish	
1989	Shirley Huggan (2)	5 & 4	Lindsey Anderson	Moray	
1988	Shirley Lawson	3 & 1	Fiona Anderson	Southerness	
1987	Fiona Anderson	4 & 3	Christine Middleton	Nairn	
1986	Belle Robertson (7)	3 & 2	Lesley Hope	Old Course, St Andrews	
1985	Alison Gemmill (2)	2 & 1	Donna Thomson	Kilmarnock (Barassie)	
1984	Gillian Stewart (3)	3 & 2	Alison Gemmill	Royal Dornoch	
1983	Gillian Stewart (2)	3 & 1	Fiona Anderson	North Berwick	
1982	Jane Connachan	19 holes	Pamela Wright	Royal Troon	
1981	Alison Gemmill	2 & 1	Wilma Aitken	Stranraer	
1980	Belle Robertson (6)	1 up	Fiona Anderson	Carnoustie	
1979	Gillian Stewart	2 & 1	Lesley Hope	Gullane	
1978	Belle Robertson (5)	2 up	Joan Smith	Prestwick Golf Links	
1977	Connie Lugton	1 up	Muriel Thomson	Royal Dornoch	
1976	Sandra Needham	3 & 2	Ina Walker	Machrihanish	
1975	Lesley Hope	1 up	Joan Smith	Elie	
1974	Aileen Wilson	22 holes	Kathleen Lackie	Nairn	
1973	Janette Wright (4)	2 up	Aileen Wilson	Old Course, St Andrews	
1972	Belle Robertson (4)	5 & 3	Connie Lugton	Machrihanish	
1971	Belle Robertson (3)	3 & 2	Marjory Ferguson	Royal Dornoch	
1970	Annette Laing	1 up	Belle Robertson	Dunbar	
1969	Heather Anderson	5 & 4	Kathleen Lackie	West Kilbride	
1968	Joan Smith	10 & 9	Joan Rennie	Carnoustie	
1967	Joan Hastings	5 & 3	Annette Laing	North Berwick	
1966	Belle Robertson (2)	2 & 1	Marjory Fowler	Machrihanish	
1965	Belle Robertson	5 & 4	Joan Lawrence	Nairn	
1964	Joan Lawrence (3)	5 & 4	Ansley Reid	Gullane	
1963	Joan Lawrence (2)	2 & 1	Belle Robertson	Troon	
1962	Joan Lawrence	5 & 4	Marjorie Draper	Royal Dornoch	
1961	Janette Wright (3)	1 up	Ansley Lurie	Old Course, St Andrews	
1960	Janette Robertson (2)	2 & 1	Dorothea Sommerville	Turnberry	
1959	Janette Robertson	6 & 5	Belle McCorkindale	Nairn	
1958	Dorothea Sommerville	1 up	Janette Robertson	Elie	
1957	Marigold Speir	7 & 5	Helen Holm	Troon	
1956	Jessie Valentine (6)	8 & 7	Helen Holm	Royal Dornoch	
1955	Jessie Valentine (5)	7 & 6	Millicent Couper	North Berwick	
1954	Marjorie Peel	7 & 6	Jessie Valentine	Turnberry	
1953	Jessie Valentine (4)	8 & 7	Jean Donald	Carnoustie	
1952	Jean Donald (3)	13 & 11	Marjorie Peel	Gullane	
1951	Jessie Valentine (3)	3 & 2	Moira Paterson	Nairn	
1950	Helen Holm (5)	6 & 5	Charlotte Beddows	Old Course, St Andrews	
1949	Jean Donald (2)	6 & 5	Helen Holm	Troon	
1948	Helen Holm (4)	5 & 4	Vyvian Falconer	Gleneagles	
1947	Jean Donald	5 & 3	Jean Kerr	Elie	
1940–1946: Not played due to World War II
1939	Jessie Anderson (2)	19 holes	Catherine Park	Turnberry	
1938	Jessie Anderson	2 up	Helen Holm	Nairn	
1937	Helen Holm (3)	3 & 2	Elizabeth Bowhill	Gleneagles	
1936	Doris Park	19 holes	Clem Montgomery	Turnberry	
1935	Minnie Robertson-Durham	20 holes	Nan Baird	Lossiemouth	
1934	Nan Baird	1 up	Jessie Anderson	North Berwick	
1933	Millicent Couper	22 holes	Helen Holm	Turnberry	
1932	Helen Holm (2)	23 holes	Freda Coats	Cruden Bay	
1931	Jean McCulloch (3)	19 holes	Doris Park	Gullane	
1930	Helen Holm	1 up	Doris Park	Turnberry	
1929	Charlotte Watson (4)	3 & 1	Doris Park	Nairn	
1928	Jean McCulloch (2)	2 & 1	Peggie Ramsay	Old Course, St Andrews	
1927	Betty Inglis	1 up	Hilda Cameron	Machrihanish	
1926	Mary Wood	2 & 1	Mrs J Cochrane	Cruden Bay	
1925	Gertrude Percy	1 up	Elsie Grant Suttie	Gullane	
1924	Clem Montgomery	5 & 4	Hilda Cameron	Turnberry	
1923	May Nicolson	2 & 1	Charlotte Watson	Lossiemouth	
1922	Charlotte Watson (3)	2 & 1	Audrey Kyle	Old Course, St Andrews	
1921	Charlotte Watson (2)	1 up	Maude Martin	Machrihanish	
1920	Charlotte Watson	5 & 3	Lena Scroggie	Cruden Bay	
1915–1919: Not played due to World War I
1914	Eva Anderson	20 holes	Frances Teacher	Muirfield	
1913	Jean McCulloch	4 & 3	Ruth Mackintosh	Machrihanish	
1912	Dorothy Jenkins	4 & 2	Madge Neill-Fraser	Lossiemouth	
1911	Elsie Grant Suttie	1 up	Ida Kyle	Old Course, St Andrews	
1910	Elsie Kyle (2)	4 & 3	Alexa Glover	Nairn	
1909	Elsie Kyle	3 & 1	Dorothy Campbell	Machrihanish	
1908	Dorothy Campbell (3)	7 & 6	Miss M Cairns	Gullane	
1907	Frances Teacher	21 holes	Dorothy Campbell	Troon	
1906	Dorothy Campbell (2)	3 & 1	Alexa Glover	Cruden Bay	
1905	Dorothy Campbell	19 holes	Molly Graham	North Berwick	
1904	Molly Graham	6 & 5	Miss M Bishop	Prestwick, St Nicholas	
1903	Alexa Glover	1 up	Molly Graham	Old Course, St Andrews	
