= Alexa Glover =

Scottish amateur golfer

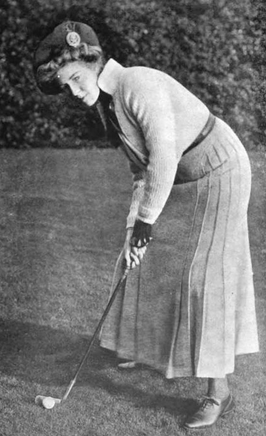
- Glover in 1907

Personal information
- Full name: Alexandra Malcolm Glover
- Nationality: Scotland
- Born: 8 November 1882 Edinburgh, Scotland
- Died: 12 December 1933 (aged 51) Edinburgh, Scotland

Career
- Sport: Golf
- Status: Amateur

Alexandra Malcolm Glover (8 November 1882 – 12 December 1933) was an amateur golfer. She won the inaugural Scottish Women's Amateur Championship, played on the Old Course at St Andrews in June 1903.

== Golf career ==
Glover played for Scotland in the Women's internationals at Deal in 1902. She was not in the team of six against Ireland but played the following day against England, when the teams were increased to ten. England beat Scotland 8–0 with two matches halved. Glover lost her match. In the Women's Amateur Championship that followed, Glover reached the fifth round, the quarter-finals, before losing 7&5 to the eventual winner, May Hezlet.

In May 1903, Glover travelled to Royal Portrush to play in the Women's Amateur Championship. In the second round she met May Hezlet, losing again, this time by 6&4. The first Scottish Women's Amateur Championship was held in June 1903. It was organised by the St Rule Club and played on the Old Course at St Andrews. Glover met Molly Graham in the final. The match was level after 17 holes but Glover won the 18th to win the match.

In 1904, before the Women's Amateur Championship at Troon, a triangular series of internationals were arranged. England beat Scotland 5–4, Ireland beat England 6–3 and Scotland beat Ireland 7–2, one match being halved in each contest. The first two matches were played at Troon, the third at Prestwick. Glover lost to Lottie Dod but beat Rhona Adair, the reigning women's champion. On the Monday before the championship a stroke-play event was generally organised. In difficult conditions Glover scored 81 to win the competition by 5 strokes. In the championship, Glover lost in the second round to Madge Maitland, also from the Elie and Earlsferry club, at the 19th hole. The Scottish Women's Amateur Championship was held the following week at Prestwick, St Nicholas. Glover lost in the quarter-finals.

The first official Women's Home Internationals were played at Cromer in 1905. Scotland beat both England and Ireland to win the title. Wales did not complete. Glover lost to Elinor Nevile but beat Florence Hezlet. The day before the Home Internationals an informal match was played between a team of American ladies and a team of British ladies. Glover played for the British team, winning her match against Frances Griscom. In the championship Glover reached the fourth round but lost to Maud Titterton at the 21st hole. The 1905 Scottish Women's Amateur Championship was the first one organised by the Scottish Ladies' Golfing Association and was held at North Berwick Golf Club. Glover won a stroke-play event played the day before the championship but lost in the first round to Grace Robertson.

Glover played in the Women's Home Internationals in 1906 at Burnham. Scotland retained the title by winning both their matches. Glover won her two matches, beating Evelyn Morant and Violet Tynte. She reached the last-16 in the Women's Amateur Championship, losing to Florence Hezlet. The following month she reached the final of the Scottish Women's Amateur Championship, losing to Dorothy Campbell

Glover also played in the Women's Home Internationals in 1908, 1909 and 1912. She reached the semi-finals of the 1908 Scottish Women's Amateur Championship, losing again to Dorothy Campbell, and reached the final again in 1910, losing to Elsie Kyle.

Glover continued to play until shortly before her death. She played in the Scottish Women's Amateur Championship in June 1933, losing in the first round to Jessie Anderson.

== Personal life ==
Glover was born in November 1882 in Edinburgh, the daughter of Thomas Craigie Glover, an engineer, and Ellen Denoon Gordon. Thomas Craigie Glover died in Edinburgh in July 1904. Glover died of pneumonia in Edinburgh in December 1933, aged 51. She was unmarried.

== Team appearances ==
- Women's Home Internationals (representing Scotland): 1902, 1904, 1905 (winners), 1906 (winners), 1908 (winners), 1909 (winners), 1912
