= Pam Davies =

English amateur golfer (1930–2020)

Personal information
- Full name: Pamela Elizabeth Davies
- Nationality: England
- Born: 12 April 1930 Coventry, England
- Died: 23 August 2020 (aged 90) England

Career
- Sport: Golf
- Status: Amateur

Pamela Elizabeth Davies (married name Large, 12 April 1930 – 23 August 2020) was an English amateur golfer. She won the Girls Amateur Championship in 1949 and the English Women's Amateur Championship in 1952.

== Golf career ==
In 1949, the Girls Amateur Championship was played at Beaconsfield Golf Club, the first time it has been held since 1938. Davies was a medical student at the time. She played for England in the England–Scotland girls match that preceded the championship and went on to win the event, beating Arlette Jacquet, from Belgium, by one hole in the final.

In 1950, Davies reached the final of the English Women's Amateur Championship at Sheringham in Norfolk, losing, 8 and 6, to Joan Gee in the 36-hole final. In 1952, she won the championship, at Westward Ho! in Devon, beating Jacqueline Gordon, 6 and 5, in the final.

In 1950, Davies represented England in an unofficial match against a team of visiting Australian women. The match finished level, with each team winning three matches. Davies lost her singles match. She played for England in the Women's Home Internationals in 1951 and 1952. Scotland beat England 9–0 in 1951 and 6–3 in 1952, with Ireland also beating England in 1952.

Later, Davies was involved in golf administration as an England ladies selector and as captain of the England team for the Women's Home Internationals.

== Team appearances ==
- England–Scotland girls match (representing England): 1949 (winners)
- Women's Home Internationals (representing England): 1951, 1952
