= Girls Amateur Championship =

Tournament information
- Location: United Kingdom
- Established: 1919
- Course: Various in United Kingdom
- Organized by: The R&A
- Format: Stroke play followed by match play

Current champion
- (France) Lily Reitter

The Girls Amateur Championship is a golf tournament held annually in the United Kingdom. Girls need to be under 18 on 1 January in the year of the championship.

Until World War II the championship was organised by a series of magazines and always held at Stoke Poges Golf Club near Slough. it was first held in 1919, although an event was planned in 1914 but was cancelled because of the start of World War I. After World War II it restarted in 1949 when the Ladies Golf Union took over the event. It is now run by The R&A, following the merger with the Ladies Golf Union in 2017.

== Format ==
Currently the championship involves two rounds of stroke-play after which the 64 lowest scores compete in six rounds of match-play. Ties for 64th place are decided by countback. All match-play rounds are over 18 holes, except the final which is played over 36 holes, with extra holes played, if necessary, to decide the winner. Girls need to be under 18 on 1 January in the year of the championship.

== History ==
The first attempt to run the event was in 1914, when The Gentlewoman magazine organised an event, for which Princess Mary, then 17, presented a trophy. The event was to have been played on 17 and 18 September at Stoke Poges Golf Club but was cancelled because of the start of World War I.

The 1919 event was organised by Mabel Stringer, the sports editor of The Gentlewoman. It was played on 17 and 18 September at Stoke Poges. 16 girls competed, having qualified through local events. Two rounds were played each day. The first winner of the Princess Mary trophy was Audrey Croft, from Ashford Manor, who beat Christina Clarke, from Reddish Vale, by 1 hole in the final. The two finalists in 1919 met again in 1920, Miss Clarke winning this time at the 21st hole. The first overseas winner was Simone de la Chaume from France, who beat Dorothy Pearson in 1924. The 1926 championship was won by another French girl, Diana Esmond, who beat Margaret Ramsden in the final. Ramsden had beaten Esmond's sister, Sybil in the semi-final. Diana Fishwick became the first two-time winner, winning in 1927 and 1928 while Pauline Doran won three times in a row, 1930, 1931 and 1932. Doran had beaten Dorrit Wilkins in the final in both 1930 and 1931 and beat Aline de Gunzbourg from France, in 1932.

1932 was the first year that The Bystander magazine organised the event. The Gentlewoman magazine had merged with Eve: The Lady's Pictorial, later to become Britannia and Eve, and the event had been known as the Eve's Girls Championship since 1927. Nancy Jupp became the youngest winner when she won the 1934 championship at the age of 13, beating Joan Montford, nearly five years older, in the final. There was a French winner again in 1937, Lally Vagliano beating the defending champion, Peggy Edwards, in the final. The 1939 championship was planned for September but was cancelled because of the start of World War II. The first England–Scotland girls match was held in 1935, on the Monday before the start of the championship. Scotland won by 5 matches to 2.

The event was not restarted after the war until the Ladies Golf Union took over the organisation of the event in 1949. Played at Beaconsfield Golf Club, the tournament was won by Pam Davies, a Coventry medical student, who beat Arlette Jacquet, from Belgium, by one hole. The first post-war overseas winner was Brigitte Varangot from France who won at North Berwick in 1957, beating the defending champion Ruth Porter in the final. Varangot reached the final the following year at Cotswold Hills but lost to Tessa Ross Steen in the final. It was not until 1969 that there was another overseas winner, Joyce de Witt Puyt, from the Netherlands, beating the Belgian Corinne Reybroeck in the final. Reybroeck had also been runner-up in 1968. Since 1969 the number of overseas winners has increased, outnumbering British winners, although two Scots, Jane Connachan and Mhairi McKay are the only girls since the war to win the championship twice. Stroke-play qualifying was introduced in 1986 with 16 players advancing to the match-play stage. The event is now run by The R&A, following the merger with the LGU in 2017. In 2022 the final was extended from 18 to 36 holes.

== Results ==
Year	Venue	Champion	Score	Runner-up
2025	Conwy	(France) Lily Reitter	4 & 2	(England) Charlotte Naughton
2024	Alwoodley	(Sweden) Havanna Torstensson	8 & 7	(Poland) Matylda Krawczyńska
2023	Ganton	(Germany) Helen Briem	12 & 10	(Spain) Martina Navarro Navarro
2022	Carnoustie	(England) Lottie Woad	7 & 6	(Spain) Cayetana Fernández García-Poggio
2021	Fulford	(Scotland) Hannah Darling	2 up	(Republic of Ireland) Beth Coulter
2020	Southport and Ainsdale	Cancelled		
2019	Panmure	(Slovenia) Pia Babnik	4 & 3	(Austria) Isabella Holpfer
2018	Ardglass	(Austria) Emma Spitz	2 & 1	(Austria) Isabella Holpfer
2017	Enville	(England) Lily May Humphreys	7 & 5	(Norway) Emilie Overas
2016	Royal St David's	(Italy) Emilie Alba Paltrinieri	4 & 3	(England) Isobel Wardle
2015	West Kilbride	(Norway) Sandra Nordaas	2 & 1	(Spain) Marta Perez Sanmartin
2014	Massereene	(Spain) Alejandra Pasarin	2 & 1	(Germany) Chiara Mertens
2013	Fairhaven	(China) Jing Yan	1 up	(Italy) Roberta Liti
2012	Tenby	(England) Georgia Hall	6 & 5	(Spain) Clara Baena
2011	Gullane No.1	(Belgium) Margaux Vanmol	1 up	(France) Céline Boutier
2010	Royal Belfast	(France) Alexandra Bonetti	7 & 6	(Italy) Laura Sedda
2009	West Lancashire	(France) Perrine Delacour	2 up	(England) Elizabeth Mallett
2008	Monifieth Links	(Belgium) Laura Gonzalez Escallon	2 & 1	(England) Kelly Tidy
2007	Southerndown	(England) Henrietta Brockway	4 & 3	(England) Kelly Tidy
2006	Portstewart	(Spain) Belén Mozo	3 & 1	(Scotland) Sally Watson
2005	West Hill	(Sweden) Anna Nordqvist	2 & 1	(Spain) Azahara Muñoz
2004	Lanark	(Spain) Azahara Muñoz	4 & 2	(France) Valentine Derrey
2003	Newport	(Norway) Marianne Skarpnord	2 & 1	(Spain) Beatriz Recari
2002	Sandiway	Abandoned because of rain		
2001	Brough	(Scotland) Clare Queen	1 up	(Spain) Carmen Alonso
2000	Blairgowrie	(Italy) Tullia Calzavara	1 up	(England) Rachel Bell
1999	High Post	(Norway) Suzann Pettersen	3 & 1	(Germany) Miriam Nagl
1998	Holyhead	(England) Maria Beautell	4 & 3	(Germany) Miriam Nagl
1997	West Kilbride	(France) Caroline Laurens	2 & 1	(Germany) Miriam Nagl
1996	Formby Ladies	(France) Marine Monnet	4 & 3	(France) Caroline Laurens
1995	Northop County Park	(France) Anne Thevenin-Lemoine	3 & 2	(Sweden) Jessica Krantz
1994	Gog Magog	(France) Amandine Vincent	1 up	(England) Rebecca Hudson
1993	Helensburgh	(Scotland) Mhairi McKay	4 & 3	(France) Amandine Vincent
1992	Northamptonshire	(Scotland) Mhairi McKay	2 & 1	(Spain) Sara Beautell
1991	Whitchurch (Cardiff)	(Sweden) Maria Hjorth	3 & 2	(Scotland) Janice Moodie
1990	Penrith	(Italy) Silvia Cavalleri	5 & 4	(Switzerland) Esther Valera
1989	Carlisle	(Scotland) Myra McKinlay	19 holes	(Sweden) Sofie Eriksson
1988	Pyle & Kenfig	(England) Alison MacDonald	3 & 2	(Sweden) Jessica Posener
1987	Barnham Broom	(England) Helen Dobson	19 holes	(Italy) Stefania Croce
1986	West Kilbride	(Italy) Stefania Croce	2 & 1	(England) Sarah Bennett
1985	Hesketh	(England) Susan Shapcott	3 & 1	(Scotland) Elaine Farquharson
1984	Llandudno (Maesdu)	(England) Carol Swallow	1 up	(Scotland) Elaine Farquharson
1983	Alwoodley	(Switzerland) Evelyn Orley	7 & 6	(England) Adele Walters
1982	Edzell	(England) Claire Waite	6 & 5	(Scotland) Mary Mackie
1981	Woodbridge	(Scotland) Jane Connachan	20 holes	(England) Penny Grice
1980	Wrexham	(Scotland) Jane Connachan	2 up	(Northern Ireland) Laura Bolton
1979	Edgbaston	(France) Sophie Lapaire	19 holes	(England) Pat Smillie
1978	Largs	(France) Marie-Laure de Lorenzi	2 & 1	(England) Debbie Glenn
1977	Formby Ladies	(Scotland) Wilma Aitken	2 & 1	(England) Sue Bamford
1976	Pyle & Kenfig	(Scotland) Gillian Stewart	5 & 4	(Wales) Susan Rowlands
1975	Henbury	(Scotland) Suzanne Cadden	4 & 3	(Wales) Lisa Isherwood
1974	Dunbar	(England) Ruth Barry	1 up	(Wales) Tegwen Perkins
1973	Northamptonshire County	(France) Anne Marie Palli	2 & 1	(France) Nathalie Jeanson
1972	Royal Norwich	(Scotland) Maureen Walker	2 & 1	(Scotland) Suzanne Cadden
1971	North Berwick	(Republic of Ireland) Josephine Mark	4 & 3	(Scotland) Maureen Walker
1970	North Wales	(Jersey) Carol Le Feuvre	2 & 1	(England) Mickey Walker
1969	Ilkley	(Netherlands) Joyce de Witt Puyt	2 & 1	(Belgium) Corinne Reybroeck
1968	Leven	(Northern Ireland) Carol Wallace	4 & 3	(Belgium) Corinne Reybroeck
1967	Liphook	(England) Penny Burrows	2 & 1	(England) Jill Hutton
1966	Troon Portland	(Scotland) Jill Hutton	20 holes	(England) Dinah Oxley
1965	Formby Ladies	(England) Anne Willard	3 & 2	(England) Shirley Ward
1964	Camberley Heath	(England) Pam Tredinnick	2 & 1	(Scotland) Kathleen Cumming
1963	Gullane	(England) Dinah Oxley	2 & 1	(England) Barbara Whitehead
1962	Alnmouth	(England) Susan McLaren-Smith	2 & 1	(Scotland) Aileen Murphy
1961	Beaconsfield	(England) Diane Robb	3 & 2	(England) Jean Roberts
1960	Kilmarnock (Barassie)	(England) Susan Clarke	2 & 1	(England) Ann Irvin
1959	Woolaton Park	(England) Sheila Vaughan	1 up	(England) Julia Greenhalgh
1958	Cotswold Hills	(England) Tessa Ross Steen	2 & 1	(France) Brigitte Varangot
1957	North Berwick	(France) Brigitte Varangot	3 & 2	(England) Ruth Porter
1956	Seaton Carew	(England) Ruth Porter	5 & 4	(England) Annette Nicholson
1955	Beaconsfield	(England) Angela Ward	5 & 4	(England) Alison Gardner
1954	West Kilbride	(England) Bridget Jackson	20 holes	(England) Dolores Winsor
1953	Woodhall Spa	(England) Susan Hill	3 & 2	(England) Angela Ward
1952	Stoke Poges	(England) Ann Phillips	7 & 6	(England) Suzanne Marbrook
1951	Gullane	(England) Jane Redgate	19 holes	(Scotland) Janette Robertson
1950	Formby	(Scotland) Janette Robertson	5 & 4	(England) Ann Phillips
1949	Beaconsfield	(England) Pam Davies	1 up	(Belgium) Arlette Jacquet
1939–1948: Not played
1938	Stoke Poges	(Scotland) Sheila Stroyan	4 & 3	(England) Joan Pemberton
1937	Stoke Poges	(France) Lally Vagliano	5 & 4	(England) Peggy Edwards
1936	Stoke Poges	(England) Peggy Edwards	3 & 2	(England) Jacqueline Gordon
1935	Stoke Poges	(England) Peggy Falkner	1 up	(England) Joan Pemberton
1934	Stoke Poges	(Scotland) Nancy Jupp	3 & 1	(Scotland) Joan Montford
1933	Stoke Poges	(Scotland) Jessie Anderson	5 & 3	(England) Enid Pears
1932	Stoke Poges	(England) Pauline Doran	19 holes	(France) Aline de Gunzbourg
1931	Stoke Poges	(England) Pauline Doran	2 & 1	(England) Dorrit Wilkins
1930	Stoke Poges	(England) Pauline Doran	19 holes	(England) Dorrit Wilkins
1929	Stoke Poges	(Scotland) Nan Baird	4 & 3	(England) Sylvia Bailey
1928	Stoke Poges	(England) Daina Fishwick	3 & 2	(England) Marion Jolly
1927	Stoke Poges	(England) Diana Fishwick	7 & 6	(England) Irene Taylor
1926	Stoke Poges	(France) Diana Esmond	6 & 5	(England) Margaret Ramsden
1925	Stoke Poges	(England) Enid Wilson	5 & 3	(England) Katharine Nicholls
1924	Stoke Poges	(France) Simone de la Chaume	4 & 2	(England) Dorothy Pearson
1923	Stoke Poges	(England) Mary Mackay	3 & 2	(England) Barbara Strohmenger
1922	Stoke Poges	(England) Muriel Wickenden	4 & 3	(England) Barbara Griffiths
1921	Stoke Poges	(England) Winifred Sarson	5 & 3	(England) Marjorie Parkinson
1920	Stoke Poges	(England) Christina Clarke	21 holes	(England) Audrey Croft
1919	Stoke Poges	(England) Audrey Croft	1 up	(England) Christina Clarke

== Future venues ==
- 2026 - Craigielaw Golf Club
- 2027 - Burnham & Berrow Golf Club
