= Liz Chadwick =

English amateur golfer

Personal information
- Full name: Elizabeth M. Chadwick
- Nationality: England
- Born: 4 April 1943 Inverness, Scotland
- Died: 6 December 2012 (aged 69) Cheshire, England

Career
- Sport: Golf
- Status: Amateur

Elizabeth M. Chadwick (later Pook, 4 April 1943 – 6 December 2012) was an English amateur golfer. She won the Ladies' British Open Amateur Championship in 1966 and 1967. She played in the Curtis Cup in 1966.

== Golf career ==
In 1961 Chadwick was selected for the England team in the England–Scotland girls match. England won by 9 matches to 3, although Chadwick lost both her matches.

In 1963 Chadwick reached the final of the English Women's Amateur Championship at Liphook, losing 7&6 to Angela Bonallack in the 36-hole final. Bonallack was 6 holes ahead after the morning round. Chadwick played for England in that years Women's Home Internationals.and for Great Britain & Ireland in the Vagliano Trophy match at Muirfield. However, she missed out on selection for the 1964 Curtis Cup team.

In 1966 Chadwick was runner-up in the Astor Prince's Trophy, behind Catherine Lacoste. She was not in the original Curtis Cup team for the 1966 match in Hot Springs, Virginia, being selected as first reserve, but was added to the team when Julia Greenhalgh later withdrew with an injured hand. Later in 1966 she won the Ladies' British Open Amateur Championship at Ganton, beating Vivien Saunders 3&2 in the 18-hole final. She had beaten Catherine Lacoste at the 20th hole in the morning semi-final, Lacoste having led the stroke-play qualifying. Chadwick retained the title the following year, 1967, at Royal St David's, beating Mary Everard in the final. She was two holes up with three to play before Everard won the next two holes with 3s. However Everard made a bogey at the final hole and Chadwick's par 3 was sufficient for a narrow victory. Earlier in 1967 Chadwick, playing with Catherine Lacoste, was a runner-up in the Avia Foursomes. Chadwick played a number of international matches in 1967, playing for Great Britain in the Commonwealth Trophy in Canada, for Great Britain & Ireland in the Vagliano Trophy and for England in the European Ladies' Team Championship in Portugal and the Women's Home Internationals.

Chadwick retired from top-level golf in early 1968, missing out on selection for that years Curtis Cup team.

== Personal life ==
Chadwick was born in Inverness in 1943. In 1969, she married Tony Pook and had a son and a daughter. In 1986, she was paralysed from the waist down following an operation for a slipped disc. She died in December 2012 at her home in Cheshire.

== Team appearances ==
- Curtis Cup (representing Great Britain & Ireland): 1966
- Vagliano Trophy (representing Great Britain & Ireland): 1963 (winners), 1967
- Commonwealth Trophy (representing Great Britain): 1967 (winners)
- European Ladies' Team Championship (representing England): 1967 (winners)
- Women's Home Internationals (representing England): 1963 (winners), 1965 (winners), 1966 (winners), 1967 (joint winners)
- England–Scotland girls match (representing England): 1961 (winners)
