= Lally Segard =

French amateur golfer (1921–2018)

Personal information
- Full name: Dorothée Sonia Segard
- Nickname: Lally
- Nationality: France
- Born: 4 April 1921 Paris, France
- Died: 3 March 2018 (aged 96) Paris, France
- Spouses: Vicomte Jacques Henri Edmund Eduard de Rafélis de Saint-Sauveur (1939–1969); Patrick Segard (1970–1979)
- Children: 2

Career
- Sport: Golf
- Status: Amateur

Dorothée Sonia "Lally" Segard (née Vagliano) (4 April 1921 – 3 March 2018), also known as Vicomtesse de Saint Sauveur, was a French amateur golfer.

== Early life ==
In 1921, Segard was born in Paris, France. She is the oldest of three siblings of a Greek (born in Marseilles, France) father, André Marino Vagliano (1896–1971) and an American mother, Barbara Frances Gallatin Allen (1897–1951), married 1920 in New York. Her brother Alexander (1927–2003) emigrated to the United States in 1940 and later reached a position as executive vice president at JP Morgan & Co.

Her father won the French Open Amateur Championship in 1925 and the French Close Amateur in 1930 and 1931. He was also captain of the French National team and on the board of the French Golf Federation where he became the initiator of the PGA of France. In 1959, he donated the trophy for the biennial match, named the Vagliano Trophy, between female amateur teams; Great Britain and Ireland playing against the Continent of Europe.

Segard's mother was also an elite golfer and become captain of the France National Ladies team.

Segard played both tennis and golf and was inspired by her fifteen months younger sister Sonia to develop her golf. The two sisters learned golf at Compiègne, 80 kilometers north of Paris, before being members at Golf de Chantilly and Golf de Morfontaine, both also situated north of Paris. At Morfontaine, Segard came to brake the ladies' course record, with a score of 73, when she was 16 years old. In 1935, the two sisters, 13 and 14 years of age, competed abroad for the first time, when they took part in the British Girls Amateur Championship at Stoke Poges, Buckinghamshire, England.

== Amateur career ==
In May 1937, Segard was, for the first time, part of the French team, with her mother as the team captain, competing against Great Britain and Ireland in the, at the time annual, match, that many years later came to bear her family's name, the Vagliano Trophy. She came to represent France ten times and the Continent of Europe three times, since the format of the event was changed, in the match.

In September 1937, she was back in England and won the British Girls Amateur Championship, defeating the two years older title holder Peggy Edwards, by 5 and 4 in the 18 hole final.

In 1939, she won her first French Ladies' Close Championship title, succeeding Simone Lacoste, wife of tennis great René Lacoste, at Segard's home course Morfontaine. Despite not competing in 1945, due to World War II, she was winner of the championship eight times and was runner-up as late as 1967, 46 years old, losing in the final on the second extra hole.

Segard won many important amateur titles, including the British Ladies Amateur in 1950, beating Jessie Valentine by 3 and 2 in the final at Royal County Down, Newcastle, Northern Ireland. She won the French Ladies' Open Amateur Championship four times and also won the open amateur championships of Spain, Italy, Switzerland, Benelux and Luxembourg.

She represented France four times at the European Ladies' Team Championship and was on the winning team at the first two times the championship was played, 1959 and 1961.

Along with Mrs. Henri Prunaret from United States, Segard initiated and planned the first women's world amateur team championship, the Espirito Santo Trophy, held in 1964 at Golf de Saint Germain, outside Paris, France. She asked her friends Ricardo and Silvia Espirito Santo, who were Portuguese bankers, to donate a trophy for the event, which they did. She was the French non-playing captain in these championships from 1964 until 1972. The French team of Claudine Cros, Catherine Lacoste and Brigitte Varangot won the inaugural championship in 1964 under the captaincy of Segard.

From 1964 Segard was president of the Ladies section of the World Amateur Golf Council, later known as the International Golf Federation, retiring in 1994, when hosting of the Espirito Santo Trophy tournament came back to France after 30 years and was played at Le Golf National, south of Paris.

She also served the French Golf Federation as Vice-President for many years.

== Personal life ==
She married Vicomte Jacques Henri Edmund Eduard de Rafélis de Saint-Sauveur (1912-2002) on 22 December 1939 and was known under the name of Vicomtesse de Saint-Sauveur during her competitive career. They divorced in 1969. They had two children, a daughter, Evelyne, born 1940, and a boy, Alain, born in 1942. Both of her children pre-deceased her, but she had several grandchildren.

In October 1970, she married her second husband, Patrick Segard, who died in 1979, aged 52.

Segard died at age 96 on 3 March 2018, in Paris, and her funeral ceremony was held on 13 March in the American Cathedral of Paris at Avenue Georges V.

== Awards and honors ==
- At the 30-year anniversary of the 1964 Espirito Santo Trophy, an engraved commemorative silver heart jewel, signed by 19 of the all-time greatest French female golfers, including Catherine Lacoste, Brigitte Varangot, Anne-Marie Palli and Patricia Meunier-Lebouc, was offered to Segard.
- In February 2015, Segard became one of seven women, invited as the first female honorary members of The Royal and Ancient Golf Club of St Andrews. The other six women were HRH The Princess Royal, Dame Laura Davies, Renee Powell, Belle Robertson, Louise Suggs and Annika Sörenstam. They joined the existing 15 male honorary members, whom included President George H. W. Bush, Peter Thomson CBE, Jack Nicklaus, Arnold Palmer and Gary Player.
- She was also an Honorary Member of her original home club Morfontaine, of Golf de Saint-Cloud and of Golf de Chantilly.
- She was an Honorary Member of the European Golf Association.
- She was Honorary President of The European Association of Golf Historians & Collectors, EAGHC.
- She received national recognition in France, awarded Officer of France's National Order of Merit and Commander of the Order of Sporting Merit.
- The French Senior Ladies' Championship is named the Lally Segard Trophy.

== Amateur wins ==
- 1937 Girls Amateur Championship
- 1939 French Ladies Close Amateur Championship
- 1943 French Ladies Close Amateur Championship
- 1944 French Ladies Close Amateur Championship
- 1946 French Ladies Close Amateur Championship
- 1949 French Ladies Close Amateur Championship, Swiss Ladies Open Amateur Championship, Luxembourg Ladies Open Amateur Championship, Italian Ladies Open Amateur Championship
- 1950 British Ladies Amateur, French Ladies Open Amateur Championship, French Ladies Close Amateur Championship
- 1951 Spanish International Ladies Amateur Championship, French Ladies Open Amateur Championship, French Ladies Close Amateur Championship, Italian Ladies Open Amateur Championship
- 1952 French Ladies Open Amateur Championship
- 1953 Benelux Ladies Open Amateur Championship
- 1954 French Ladies Close Amateur Championship, Benelux Ladies Open Amateur Championship
- 1955 Swiss Ladies Open Amateur Championship, Benelux Ladies Open Amateur Championship
- 1960 Kayser Bondor Foursomes (with Brigitte Varangot)
- 1962 Worplesdon Mixed Foursomes (with David Frame)
- 1965 Swiss Ladies Open Amateur Championship
- 1966 Avia Foursomes (with Brigitte Varangot)

== Team appearances ==
Amateur

- European Ladies' Team Championship (representing France): 1959 (winners, playing captain), 1961 (winners, playing captain), 1963 (playing captain), 1965 (playing captain), 1967 (non-playing captain), 1969 (winners, non-playing captain), 1971 (non-playing captain)
- Vagliano Trophy (representing France): 1937, 1938, 1939, 1947, 1948, 1949, 1951, 1953, 1955, 1957
- Vagliano Trophy (representing the Continent of Europe): 1959 (playing captain), 1961 (playing captain), 1963, 1965 (non-playing captain), 1967 (winners, non-playing captain), 1969 (winners, non-playing captain)
- Espirito Santo Trophy (representing France): 1964 (winners, non-playing captain), 1966 (non-playing captain), 1968 (non-playing captain), 1970 (non-playing captain), 1972 (non-playing captain)
