= Dinah Henson =

English amateur golfer (1948–2020)

Personal information
- Full name: Dinah Lillianne Henson
- Nationality: England
- Born: 17 October 1948 England
- Died: 30 April 2020 (aged 71) England

Career
- Sport: Golf
- Status: Amateur

Dinah Lillianne Henson (née Oxley, 17 October 1948 – 30 April 2020) was an English amateur golfer. She won the Ladies' British Open Amateur Championship in 1970. She played in the Curtis Cup four times, in 1968, 1970, 1972 and 1976.

== Golf career ==
Aged 14, Henson won the Girls Amateur Championship in 1963, beating Barbara Whitehead, 2 and 1, in the final. The following year she made her debut for England in the annual England–Scotland girls match, and in 1965 she won the English girls title. In 1966, she was the losing finalist in both the English championship and the Girls Amateur Championship, losing narrowly to Barbara Whitehead and Jill Hutton.

In 1967, Henson made her debut in senior events, playing for Great Britain in the Commonwealth Trophy in Canada, for Great Britain & Ireland in the Vagliano Trophy and for England in the Women's Home Internationals. In 1968, she made her debut in the Curtis Cup. She played regularly in international matches until competing in the Curtis Cup match in mid-1972. She was part of the team of three for the 1970 Espirito Santo Trophy, where they finished sixth. Henson was the leading Great Britain & Ireland scorer on each of the four rounds.

Henson also had success individually. In 1968, she reached the final of the English Women's Amateur Championship, losing to Sally Barber in the final. However, she met Barber again in the final in both 1970 and 1971, winning both times. In 1968, playing with Joan Dudok van Heel, she won the Worplesdon Mixed Foursomes. In 1969, she won the French International Lady Juniors Amateur Championship, an under-21 event. She was runner-up in the Hovis International in 1969, 15 strokes behind Catherine Lacoste, and was also a joint runner-up in the event in 1971. Also in 1969, she was a semi-finalist in the Ladies' British Open Amateur Championship, losing to Ann Irvin at the 19th hole. The following year, she won the event, beating Belle Robertson by one hole in the final. She had led the stroke-play qualifying. Henson won the Wills Women's Match Play three years in succession, 1969, 1970 and 1971. In 1969, she was runner-up in the inaugural Ladies' British Open Amateur Stroke Play Championship, although she was nine strokes behind the winner, Ann Irvin.

Henson was married soon after competing in the 1972 Curtis Cup and dropped out of international competition, returning in 1974. She competed in the 1974 Colgate European Open and was the leading amateur, 16 strokes behind the winner, Judy Rankin. She was a joint winner of the Newmark International in 1975, and won the event by nine strokes in 1977. Playing with Jeremy Caplan, she won the Worplesdon Mixed Foursomes for the second time in 1977. Henson made her fourth appearance in the Curtis Cup in 1976 and played for England in the Home Internationals for the final time in 1978.

== Personal life ==
Born Dinah Oxley, she married James Henson in 1972. She died in 2020 aged 71.

== Team appearances ==
- Curtis Cup (representing Great Britain & Ireland): 1968, 1970, 1972, 1976
- Vagliano Trophy (representing Great Britain & Ireland): 1967, 1969, 1971 (winners)
- Commonwealth Trophy (representing Great Britain): 1967 (winners), 1971 (winners)
- Espirito Santo Trophy (representing Great Britain & Ireland): 1970
- European Ladies' Team Championship (representing England): 1971 (winners), 1977 (winners)
- Women's Home Internationals (representing England): 1967 (joint winners), 1968 (winners), 1969, 1970 (winners), 1975 (winners), 1976 (winners), 1977 (winners), 1978 (winners)
- England–Scotland girls match (representing England): 1964 (winners), 1965 (tie), 1966
