= 1964 Curtis Cup =

Golf competition in Porthcawl, Wales

Coordinates: 51.492°N 3.726°W

13th Curtis Cup Match
- Dates: 11–12 September 1964
- Venue: Royal Porthcawl Golf Club
- Location: Porthcawl, Wales
- Captains: Elsie Corlett (British Isles); Helen Hawes (USA)
(United Kingdom) (Republic of Ireland)	7 1/2	10 1/2	(United States)
- United States wins the Curtis Cup

The 13th Curtis Cup Match was played on 11 and 12 September 1964 at Royal Porthcawl Golf Club in Porthcawl, Wales. The United States won by 10 1/2 matches to 7 1/2, to retain the Curtis Cup. This was the first Curtis Cup with two sets of matches, increasing the number of points available from 9 to 18.

The teams were level after the first day. The British Isles won two of the three foursomes matches but the United States won three of the six singles with another match halved. The teams were still level after the second day foursomes but the United States won four of the six singles with another halved, to win by three points.

== Format ==
The contest was a two-day competition, with three foursomes and six singles matches on each day, a total of 18 points.

Each of the 18 matches was worth one point in the larger team competition. If a match was all square after the 18th hole extra holes were not played. Rather, each side earned 1/2 a point toward their team total. The team that accumulated at least 9 1/2 points won the competition. In the event of a tie, the current holder retained the Cup.

== Teams ==
& British Isles
Name	Notes
(England) Elsie Corlett	non-playing captain
(England) Susan Armitage
(England) Angela Bonallack	played in 1956, 1958, 1960 and 1962
(England) Julia Greenhalgh
(England) Bridget Jackson	played in 1958
(Scotland) Joan Lawrence
(England) Ruth Porter	played in 1960 and 1962
(England) Marley Spearman	played in 1960 and 1962
(England) Sheila Vaughan	played in 1962

United States
Name	Notes
Helen Hawes	non-playing captain
Peggy Conley
JoAnne Gunderson	played in 1958, 1960 and 1962
Barbara McIntire	played in 1958, 1960 and 1962
Phyllis Preuss	played in 1962
Nancy Roth
Carol Sorenson
Barbara Fay White

== Friday's matches ==
=== Morning foursomes ===
&	Results
Spearman/Bonallack	(United Kingdom) (Republic of Ireland) 2 & 1	McIntire/Preuss
Jackson/Armitage	(United States) 8 & 6	Sorenson/White
Vaughan/Porter	(United Kingdom) (Republic of Ireland) 3 & 2	Gunderson/Roth
2	Session	1
2	Overall	1

=== Afternoon singles ===
&	Results
Marley Spearman	halved	Barbara McIntire
Angela Bonallack	(United States) 6 & 5	JoAnne Gunderson
Joan Lawrence	(United States) 1 up	Peggy Conley
Julia Greenhalgh	(United States) 3 & 2	Barbara Fay White
Bridget Jackson	(United Kingdom) (Republic of Ireland) 4 & 3	Carol Sorenson
Ruth Porter	(United Kingdom) (Republic of Ireland) 1 up	Nancy Roth
2 1/2	Session	3 1/2
4 1/2	Overall	4 1/2

== Saturday's matches ==
=== Morning foursomes ===
&	Results
Spearman/Bonallack	(United Kingdom) (Republic of Ireland) 6 & 5	McIntire/Preuss
Armitage/Jackson	(United States) 2 up	Gunderson/Roth
Porter/Vaughan	halved	Sorenson/White
1 1/2	Session	1 1/2
6	Overall	6

=== Afternoon singles ===
&	Results
Marley Spearman	halved	JoAnne Gunderson
Joan Lawrence	(United States) 4 & 2	Barbara McIntire
Julia Greenhalgh	(United Kingdom) (Republic of Ireland) 5 & 3	Phyllis Preuss
Bridget Jackson	(United States) 1 up	Peggy Conley
Angela Bonallack	(United States) 3 & 2	Barbara Fay White
Ruth Porter	(United States) 3 & 2	Carol Sorenson
1 1/2	Session	4 1/2
7 1/2	Overall	10 1/2
