= Marilyn Palmer O'Connor =

Canadian amateur golfer

Marilyn Palmer O'Connor (born December 17, 1946) is a Canadian amateur golfer. She won the Canadian Women's Amateur in 1986. She has been inducted into the Canadian Golf Hall of Fame, Alberta Sports Hall of Fame, and the Golf Hall of Fame of BC.

== Early life ==
Palmer was born on December 17, 1946, in Vancouver, British Columbia, Canada. Her father Rod Palmer, who was a professional golfer at the Kamloops Golf and Country Club, taught her how to golf from a young age. While her father was working at the club, she trained with the men and boys. During her early teen years, she won the Vernon ladies' low net title, Kamloops Sweepstakes, and B.C. Women's Closs golf tournament. Within her first year out of the junior ranks, Palmer won the Canadian Women's Close golf championship in 1966. While attending Kamloops High School, she also figure skated and won the Okanagan senior pairs title.

== Amateur career ==
While attending the University of British Columbia to become a primary school teacher, Palmer continued to golf and won the 1969 B.C. championship. From there, she competed and won the International 4-Ball Championship, New Zealand Foursome Championship, Pacific Northwest Ladies Golf Championship, and the 1973 Australia Invitational Team Champion as a member of Team Canada. Although she considered playing professionally with on the LPGA Tour, she chose to remain a school teacher and an amateur.

Palmer played on the Canadian team for the Espirito Santo Trophy (World Amateur Team Championship) six times: 1968, 1972, 1974, 1976, 1978, 1986. She finished tied for 10th place individually in 1968 and the team took the silver medal in 1978.

After Palmer married Don O'Connor in 1978, she moved to Alberta and continued golfing in Calgary. While living in Alberta, she won the Alberta Ladies Championship six times; in 1983, 1985, 1989, 1990, and 2001, and was runner-up in 1997, 1999, and 2000. She won the Canadian Women's Amateur in 1986. From the 1990s onward, she was an active member at Country Hills Golf Course in Calgary.

=== Legacy ===
She has been inducted into the Canadian Golf Hall of Fame, Alberta Sports Hall of Fame, and the Golf Hall of Fame of BC.

== Team appearances ==
Amateur Espirito Santo Trophy (representing Canada): 1968, 1972, 1974, 1976, 1978, 1986
