= 1967 European Ladies' Team Championship =

Golf competition

Tournament information
- Dates: 4–9 July 1967
- Location: Portimão, Algarve, Portugal; 37.161°N 8.581°W
- Course: Penina Golf and Resort
- Organized by: European Golf Association
- Format: 36 holes stroke play round-robin system match play

Statistics
- Par: 75
- Field: 12 teams circa 60 players

Champion
- England; Vivien Saunders, Ann Irvin, Mary Everard, Sarah German, Liz Chadwick
- Qualification round: 463 (+13); Flight A matches: 6 points

Location map
- Location in Europe Location in Portugal

The 1967 European Ladies' Team Championship took place 4–9 July at Penina Golf and Resort in Portimão, Algarve, Portugal. It was the fifth women's golf amateur European Ladies' Team Championship.

== Venue ==
The championship course, designed by Sir Henry Cotton and situated on the south coast of Portugal, 180 kilometres south of the capital of the country, Lisbon, was set up with par 75.

It was warm and sunny during the tournament.

== Format ==
All participating teams played two qualification rounds of stroke play, counting the three best scores out of up to four players for each team. The four best teams formed flight A. The next four teams formed flight B and the last four teams formed flight C.

The winner in each flight was determined by a round-robin system. All teams in the flight met each other and the team with most points for team matches in flight A won the tournament, using the scale, win=2 points, halved=1 point, lose=0 points. In each match between two nation teams, two foursome games and four single games were played.

== Teams ==
A record number of twelve nation teams contested the event. Ireland, a combined team from Northern Ireland and the Republic of Ireland, took part for the first time. Each team consisted of a minimum of four players.

Players in the leading teams

Country	Players
Belgium	Corinne Reybroeck, Louise Van den Berghe, Josyane Leysen, Juliette de Schutter
England	Liz Chadwick, Ann Irvin, Mary Everard, Sarah German, Vivien Saunders
France	Martine Cochet, Odile Garaialde Semelaigne, C. Labesse, Florence du Pasquier Mourgue d'Algue, Lally de Saint-Sauveur, Brigitte Varangot
Ireland	Jean Beckett, Elaine Bradshaw, Gwen Brandom, Ita Butler, Pat O'Sullivan
Italy	B. M. Crotzi, F. Bastianello, Isa Goldschmidt Bevione, Bianca Martini, Marina Ragher, Marion Tadini
Scotland	Marjory Fowler, Annette Laing, Joan Lawrence, Joan Rennie, Belle Robertson
Spain	Mercedes Etchart de Ártiach, E. Johan, Emma Villacieros de García-Ogara, T. E. Perpina, A. P. Alonso
Sweden	Liv Forsell, Birgit Forsman, Louise Johansson Wingård, Britt Mattsson, Cécilia Perslow, Nina Rehnqvist
Wales	Ann Hughes Johnson, Jill Morris Edwards, Christine Phipps, Pat Roberts
West Germany	Barbara Böhm, Carola Murek, Marion Petersen, Barbara Zintl

Other participating teams

Country
Netherlands
Portugal

== Winners ==
Defending champions team England won the championship, earning 6 points in flight A.

Individual winner in the opening 36-hole stroke play qualifying competition was Odile Garaialde Semelaigne, France, with a score of 1-under-par 149.

== Results ==
Qualification round

Team standings

Place	Country	Score	To par
1	France	228-230=458	+8
2	England	233-230=463	+13
3	Italy	240-234=474	+24
4	Sweden	238-237=475	+25
5	Scotland	248-232=480	+30
6	Belgium	250-240=490	+40
7	Ireland	245-248=493	+43
8	Spain	251-245=496	+46
9	Wales	246-253=499	+49
10	West Germany	256-253=509	+59
11	Netherlands	258-255=513	+64
12	Portugal	260-263=523	+74

Individual leaders

Place	Player	Country	Score	To par
1	Odile Garaialde Semelaigne	France	76-73=149	−1
T2	Brigitte Varangot	France	75-77=152	+2
T2	Liz Chadwick	England	79-73=152	+2
T2	Maria Ragher	Italy	79-73=152	+2
5	Ann Irvin	England	77-76=153	+3

Note: There was no official recognition for the lowest individual score.

Flight A

Team matches

2	England	Italy	0
5.5		0.5	

2	France	Sweden	0
5.5		0.5	

2	England	Sweden	0
4		2	

1	France	Italy	1
3		3	

2	England	France	0
3		3	

2	Italy	Sweden	0
3.5		2.5	

Team standings

Country	Place	W	T	L	Game points	Points
England	1	2	1	0	12.5–5.5	5
France	2	1	2	0	11.5–6.5	4
Italy	3	1	1	1	7–11	3
Sweden	4	0	0	3	5–13	0

Final standings

Place	Country
1st place, gold medalist(s)	England
2nd place, silver medalist(s)	France
3rd place, bronze medalist(s)	Italy
4	Sweden
5	Scotland
6	Spain
7	Ireland
8	Belgium
9	West Germany
10	Netherlands
11	Wales
12	Portugal

== See also ==
- Espirito Santo Trophy – biennial world amateur team golf championship for women organized by the International Golf Federation.
- European Amateur Team Championship – European amateur team golf championship for men organised by the European Golf Association.
