= Wills Women's Match Play =

Tournament information
- Location: England
- Established: 1967
- Format: Match play
- Final year: 1974

The Wills Women's Match Play was a women's amateur match-play event. It was held from 1967 to 1974. Finals were over 36 holes except for 1974, which was played over 18 holes, with the semi-finals played in the morning. The event was sponsored by W.D. & H.O. Wills.

== Winners ==
Year	Winner	Score	Runner-up	Venue	Ref
Wills Women's International Match Play
1974	(England) Jenny Lee Smith	3 & 1	(England) Elizabeth Head	Wentworth	
1973	(Wales) Tegwen Perkins	4 & 3	(England) Prue Riddiford	Wentworth	
1972	(Netherlands) Annie Mackeson-Sandbach	3 & 2	(England) Ann Rampton	Camberley Heath	
1971	(England) Dinah Oxley	5 & 4	(England) Diane Frearson	Worplesdon	
1970	(England) Dinah Oxley	11 & 10	(England) Ann Rampton	Wentworth	
Wills Women's National Match Play
1969	(England) Dinah Oxley	11 & 10	(England) Barbara Dixon	Camberley Heath	
1968	(New Zealand) Heather Booth	4 & 3	(England) Angela Uzielli	Kingswood	
1967	(England) Sarah German	38 holes	(Scotland) Margaret Myles	Langley Park	
