= Mary Everard =

English amateur golfer (1942–2022)

Personal information
- Full name: Dorothy Mary Everard
- Nationality: England
- Born: 8 October 1942 Sheffield, England
- Died: 28 May 2022 (aged 79) Sheffield, England

Career
- Sport: Golf
- Status: Amateur

Dorothy Mary Everard (also Laupheimer, 8 October 1942 – 28 May 2022) was an English amateur golfer. She was runner-up in the 1967 Ladies' British Open Amateur Championship. She won the Ladies' British Open Amateur Stroke Play Championship in 1970, was twice runner-up, and was runner-up in the 1977 Women's British Open. She won the English Women's Amateur Championship in 1972 and was twice a runner-up in the event. She played in the Curtis Cup four times, in 1970, 1972, 1974 and 1978.

== Golf career ==
At the start of May 1964, Everard was a surprise winner of Yorkshire women's championship. At the end of the month, she reached the final of the English Women's Amateur Championship at Royal Lytham, losing to Marley Spearman. Spearman was 6 up after 16 holes of the 36-hole final. Everard then won four holes in a row to reduce the deficit to two, but Spearman pulled ahead again and won 6 and 5. Everard was selected for the England team for the Women's Home Internationals in June.

In early 1967, Everard won the Yorkshire championship for the second time. In June, she was runner-up in the Ladies' British Open Amateur Championship. at Royal St David's, losing to Liz Chadwick in the final. She was two holes down with three to play before winning the next two holes with 3s. However, she made a bogey at the final hole and Chadwick's par 3 was sufficient for a narrow victory. The following month, she won the Hovis International at Woolaton Park, finishing seven strokes ahead of the runner-up, Vivien Saunders. Also in 1967, she made her debut for Great Britain & Ireland in the Vagliano Trophy and she played for England in the European Ladies' Team Championship in Portugal and the Women's Home Internationals. Everard missed out on selection for the 1968 Curtis Cup match but in October played for the Great Britain & Ireland team of three in the Espirito Santo Trophy in Australia.

From 1969 to 1974, she was a regular player in international matches for Great Britain & Ireland and for England. She played less top-level golf in 1975 and 1976 but played again in 1977 and 1978. She played in four Curtis Cup matches, three times in America, and four Vagliano Trophy matches. As well as her Espirito Santo Trophy appearance in Australia in 1968, she also played in Argentina in 1972 and Fiji in 1978. She played in the winning 1971 Commonwealth Trophy team in New Zealand. In early 1973, she was part of an English team that toured East Africa while in October 1973 she played for Great Britain & Ireland in the Women's International Series in Australia.

In 1970, she won the Ladies' British Open Amateur Stroke Play Championship at Royal Birkdale, two strokes ahead of Frances Smith. She was runner-up in the event in 1971 and 1973 behind Belle Robertson and Anne Stant. From 1976, the event was opened up to professionals and became the Women's British Open. In 1977, she was runner-up to Vivien Saunders, losing on "countback". They had tied on 306 but Saunders had the better final round, 76 to Everard's 79. Saunders, a professional, took the first prize of £210. Having been runner-up in the English Women's Amateur Championship in 1964, she won the event in 1972, beating Angela Bonallack, 2 and 1, in the final, and was runner-up for a second time in 1977, losing to Vanessa Marvin. In 1973 she was runner-up to Belle Robertson in the inaugural Helen Holm Scottish Women's Open Championship. Playing with Vivien Saunders, she won the 1978 Avia Foursomes. She had been runner-up in the event in 1970 and 1972, partnered by Sally Barber. Playing with John Putt, she won the Sunningdale Foursomes in 1973, beating Carl Mason and Howard Clark 6&5 in the final.

Everard's four Curtis Cup appearances were during a period when the United States dominated the event, winning 13 matches in a row from 1960 to 1984. In the four matches she played in the United States won 11 1/2–6 1/2 (1970), 10–8 (1972), 13–5 (1974) and 12–6 (1978). In 1970 Everard won two or her three matches and halved the other. She beat Nancy Hager in her only singles match. In 1972, she lost three of her four matches but beat Barbara McIntire in the final round of singles matches. In 1974, she again lost three of her four matches, winning one of her foursomes matches. In 1978, she won both her matches on the first day, including a singles win against Noreen Uihlein, and halved her match with Uihlein on the final day, after losing in the foursomes. In the four contests, she won six matches, lost seven and halved two.

== Personal life ==
Everard married John D. Laupheimer in 1979. Laupheimer was a director of the United States Golf Association and later became the commissioner of the LPGA. They were later divorced and Everard returned to England. Everard died in Sheffield on 28 May 2022.

== Team appearances ==
- Curtis Cup (representing Great Britain & Ireland): 1970, 1972, 1974, 1978
- Vagliano Trophy (representing Great Britain & Ireland): 1967, 1969, 1971 (winners), 1973 (winners)
- Espirito Santo Trophy (representing Great Britain & Ireland): 1968, 1972, 1978
- Commonwealth Trophy (representing Great Britain): 1971 (winners)
- Women's International Series (representing Great Britain and Ireland): 1973
- European Ladies' Team Championship (representing England): 1967 (winners), 1971 (winners), 1973 (winners), 1977 (winners)
- Women's Home Internationals (representing England): 1964 (winners), 1967 (joint winners), 1969, 1970 (winners), 1972 (winners), 1973 (winners), 1977 (winners), 1978 (winners)
