= Vivien Saunders =

English golfer (born 1946)

Vivien Saunders OBE
Personal information
- Full name: Vivien Inez Saunders
- Nationality: England
- Born: 24 November 1946 (age 79) Sutton, Surrey, England

Career
- Sport: Golf
- Turned professional: 1969
- Former tour: LPGA Tour

Vivien Inez Saunders, OBE (born 24 November 1946) is a retired English professional golfer, known after winning the Women's British Open in 1977. She had a successful amateur career, appearing in the 1968 Curtis Cup. She has published a number of golf books and instructional videos.

== Early years ==
Saunders was born in Sutton, Surrey on 24 November 1946 and educated at Nonsuch County High School, Cheam, Surrey.

== Golf career ==
Saunders was runner-up to Liz Chadwick in the 1966 British Ladies Amateur Golf Championship, losing 3 & 2 in the final.

Saunders turned professional in early 1969 and became the first European to qualify for the LPGA Tour later in 1969.

== Other achievements ==
She was editor of Lady Golfer for several years, also the founder of the Women's Professional Golf Association and the European Women's Tour. She was made honorary life member of PGA and Women's European Tour but had to resign from both to regain amateur status and play. Previously on Executive Committee of PGA, Chairman Women's PGA. She was a council member of National Coaching Foundation from 1993 to 1997. She has twice won the British Sports Coach of the Year Award.

In 1986, she bought Abbotsley Golf Club, near St Neots, Cambridgeshire. She is the chairman of the Association of Golf Course Owners.

Saunders was appointed Officer of the Order of the British Empire (OBE) for services to women's golf in the 1998 New Year Honours.

In the 2015 general election, she ran against Prime Minister David Cameron in Witney for the Reduce VAT in Sport party, which she also led. She finished ninth of 12 candidates, with 56 votes (0.1%).

== Legal issues ==
Saunders was convicted of assault after an incident where she pushed a neighbor with her car. She was also convicted of assaulting a second neighbour by spraying his face with a substance in a bottle. The second neighbour later committed suicide, the coroner finding that it is "probable that his worries over the forthcoming court case [with Saunders] contributed more than minimally to his actions". The case, a dispute over water rights with tennants on her property, resulted in a judgment where Saunders lost on all counts and was strongly criticised for aggressive and misleading behaviour, including making false claims to the court."

== Amateur wins ==
- 1967 Avia Foursomes (with Bridget Jackson)

== Professional wins ==
- 1977 Women's British Open
- 1978 Avia Foursomes (with Mary Everard)
- 1980 British Car Auctions Tournament (tied with Bridget Cooper)
- Keighley Trophy
- four tournaments in Australia

== Team appearances ==
Amateur

- Curtis Cup (representing Great Britain & Ireland): 1968
- European Ladies' Team Championship (representing England): 1967 (winners)
- Commonwealth Trophy (representing Great Britain): 1967 (winners)
- Vagliano Trophy (representing Great Britain & Ireland): 1967
