= Marjorie Peel =

Scottish amateur golfer

Personal information
- Full name: Marjorie Lilian Peel
- Nationality: Scotland
- Born: 18 June 1905 Edinburgh, Scotland
- Died: 1987 (aged 82) England

Career
- Sport: Golf
- Status: Amateur

Marjorie Lilian Peel (née Thomas, later Draper, 18 June 1905 – 1987) was a Scottish amateur golfer. She won the Scottish Women's Amateur Championship in 1954 and was a member of the 1954 Curtis Cup team.

== Golf career ==
Peel first reached the final of the Scottish Women's Amateur Championship at Gullane in 1952. She lost, 13 and 11, to Jean Donald, the biggest margin the history of the event. Later in 1952, in partnership with George Mackie, she won the Worplesdon Mixed Foursomes, the pair having been runners-up the previous year. In 1954 she again reached the final of the Scottish Amateur, beating Jessie Valentine, 7 and 6, in the final at Turnberry. In 1962 she reached the final for the third time, losing 5&4 to Joan Lawrence at Royal Dornoch.

In June 1954, soon after her win in the Scottish Amateur, Peel was selected for the 1954 Curtis Cup team at Merion Golf Club in September. The Americans won by 6 matches to 3. Peel lost her foursomes match and was not selected for singles. The team had earlier beaten a Canadian team, Peel winning both of her matches. In 1955 she played in the Vagliano Trophy match against France and in a match against Belgium the following day, both matches being played at Gullane. Peel played for Scotland in the Women's Home Internationals 14 times between 1929 and 1962.

== Personal life ==
Peel was born in Edinburgh, Scotland on 18 June 1905, the daughter of Lionel George Thomas. In 1931 she married Roland Tennyson Peel, who worked at the India Office. Roland Peel was killed in a plane crash in 1945, returning from the UN San Francisco Conference. She remarried in 1961 to Charles Draper.

== Team appearances ==
- Curtis Cup (representing Great Britain & Ireland): 1954
- Canada–Great Britain match (representing Great Britain & Ireland): 1954 (winners)
- Vagliano Trophy (representing Great Britain & Ireland): 1955 (winners)
- Belgium–Great Britain match (representing Great Britain & Ireland): 1955 (winners)
- Women's Home Internationals (representing Scotland): 1929, 1934, 1938 (winners), 1949, 1950 (winners), 1951 (winners), 1952 (winners), 1953, 1954, 1955 (winners), 1956 (winners), 1957 (winners), 1958, 1962 (winners)
