= Helen Holm =

Scottish amateur golfer (1907–1971)

Helen Warren Holm

Personal information
- Full name: Helen Warren Gray Holm
- Nationality: Scotland
- Born: 14 March 1907 Partick, Scotland
- Died: 14 December 1971 (aged 64) Ayr, Scotland
- Spouse: Andrew Holm
- Children: one son

Career
- Sport: Golf
- Status: Amateur

Helen Warren Holm (née Gray) (14 March 1907 – 14 December 1971) was a Scottish amateur golfer. She was Scottish champion five times and she won the British Ladies Amateur twice. The Helen Holm Trophy is named in her memory.

== Life ==
Holm was born in Partick which is part of Glasgow. Her mother was Violet Irene Emma Warren and her father Thomas was a Professor of Chemistry at the Technical College. Violet and Thomas had two daughters.

She won her first golf championship at the age of 21 when she won the 1928 Lanarkshire Open Golf championship. It was the only one she won as Helen Gray as the following year, 1929, she was married and used the name Helen Holm. She won the Scottish Ladies' Amateur Championship in 1930.

In 1934 she won the British Ladies Amateur at the Royal Porthcawl Golf Club and in 1938 she won it again at the Burnham & Berrow Golf Club. She was chosen for the biennial women's golf match between Britain and Ireland versus the USA known as the Curtis Cup in 1936 and 1938. The 1936 match was played at Gleneagles Hotel (King's Course) in Auchterarder, Perthshire, Scotland and the 1938 match was played at the Essex County Club in Manchester-by-the-Sea, Massachusetts. After the war, she played on the 1948 team, and was chosen again in 1950 but refused the honour as she did not want to be parted from her son.

Holm went on to win the Scottish Ladies' Amateur Championship four more times.

In 1951 she became the captain of the British team and contested matches against Belgium and France and she played in Scottish home internationals in 1955 and 1957.

Holm died in 1971 in a nursing home in Ayr.

== Private life ==
She married a farmer named Andrew Holm in 1928.

== Legacy ==
The Helen Holm Trophy was named in her honour in 1973 and is now known as the "Helen Holm Scottish Women's Open Amateur Stroke Play Golf Championship" and it is always contested at Royal Troon. The first winner was Belle Robertson.
