= 1968 Espirito Santo Trophy =

Tournament information
- Dates: 2–5 October
- Location: Cheltenham, Victoria, Australia; 37.967°S 145.068°E
- Course: Victoria Golf Club
- Organized by: World Amateur Golf Council
- Format: 72 holes stroke play

Statistics
- Par: 73
- Length: 6,040 yards (5,520 m)
- Field: 17 teams 51 players

Champion
- United States; Jane Bastanchury, Shelley Hamlin, Anne Quast Welts
- 616 (+32)
- Location in Australia Location in Victoria Location in greater Melbourne

The 1968 Espirito Santo Trophy took place 2–5 October at Victoria Golf Club in Cheltenham, south of central Melbourne, Victoria, Australia. It was the third women's golf World Amateur Team Championship for the Espirito Santo Trophy. The tournament was a 72-hole stroke play team event with 17 three-woman teams. The best two scores for each round counted towards the team total.

The United States won the Trophy, beating the host nation Australia by five strokes. Australia took the silver medal while France, one stroke further behind, took the bronze, just as they did in the last championship two years earlier.

== Teams ==
17 teams contested the event. Each team had three players.

Country	Players
Argentina	Maria Julia Caserta de Aftalion, Carmen Baca Castex de Conen, Marta Saenz Vallente
Australia	Liz Cavill Blackmore, Marea Hickey Parsons, Dianna Thomas
Belgium	Francoise Berard, Corinne Reybroeck, Louise van den Berghe
Bermuda	Mrs. A.W. Card, Mrs E. Graham Gibbons, Mrs. Eric N. Parker
Canada	Gayle Hitchens Borthwick, Gail Harvey Moore, Marylin Palmer
China	Eva Chang, Yu Hwa Pan, Ming Yeh Wu
France	Claudine Cros Rubin, Catherine Lacoste, Brigitte Varangot
(United Kingdom) Great Britain & Ireland	Mary Everard, Diane Frearson, Belle Robertson
Italy	Isa Goldschmidt Bevione, Marina Ragher, Marion Tadini
Japan	Haruko Ifuku, Fasako Masui, Masako Satomi
Mexico	Fela Chavez, Florencia Hernandez, Elena Larralde
Netherlands	Alice Janmaat, Priscilla Sauter, Joyce de Witt Puyt
New Zealand	Glennis Taylor, Natalie White, Jean Whitehead
Philippines	Mercedes Feliclano, Nora Mateo, Vicky Pertierra
South Africa	Jeanette Burd, Rita Easton, Felicity Wassenaar
Sweden	Liv Forsell, Louise Johansson, Nina Rehnqvist
United States	Jane Bastachury, Shelley Hamlin, Anne Quast Welts

== Results ==
Place	Country	Score	To par
1st place, gold medalist(s)	United States	156-156-151-153=616	+32
2nd place, silver medalist(s)	Australia	158-152-153-158=621	+37
3rd place, bronze medalist(s)	France	156-152-156-158=622	+38
4	Sweden	161-162-156-159=638	+54
5	Canada	158-164-159-162=643	+59
6	(United Kingdom) Great Britain & Ireland	163-158-161-167=649	+65
7	Argentina	168-161-163-159=651	+67
8	New Zealand	165-167-157-164=653	+69
9	Philippines	168-160-165-161=654	+70
10	Italy	161-164-161-169=655	+71
11	South Africa	168-162-161-168=659	+75
12	Belgium	167-163-162-169=661	+77
13	Netherlands	172-162-164-167=665	+81
14	Japan	169-163-167-167=666	+82
15	Mexico	168-171-170-161=670	+86
16	China	165-166-170-170=671	+87
17	Bermuda	198-194-189-194=773	+189

== Individual leaders ==
There was no official recognition for the lowest individual scores.

Place	Player	Country	Score	To par
1	Catherine Lacoste	France	75-81-75-76=307	+23
2	Marea Hickey Parsons	Australia	81-75-75-77=308	+24
3	Shelley Hamlin	United States	82-76-76-75=309	+25
4	Jane Bastachury	United States	78-80-76-78=312	+28
5	Anne Quast Welts	United States	78-80-75-80=313	+29
6	Liv Forsell	Sweden	82-77-78-77=314	+30
7	Claudine Cros Rubin	France	81-75-81-82=319	+35
T8	Elisabeth Blackmore	Australia	79-80-80-81=320	+36
T8	Dianna Thomas	Australia	79-77-78-86=320	+36
T10	Marylin Palmer	Canada	78-81-81-81=321	+37
T10	Corinne Reybroeck	Belgium	81-78-78-84=321	+37
T10	Belle Robertson	(United Kingdom) Great Britain & Ireland	86-75-77-83=321	+37
