= The New Golf Club =

Golf club in Fife, Scotland

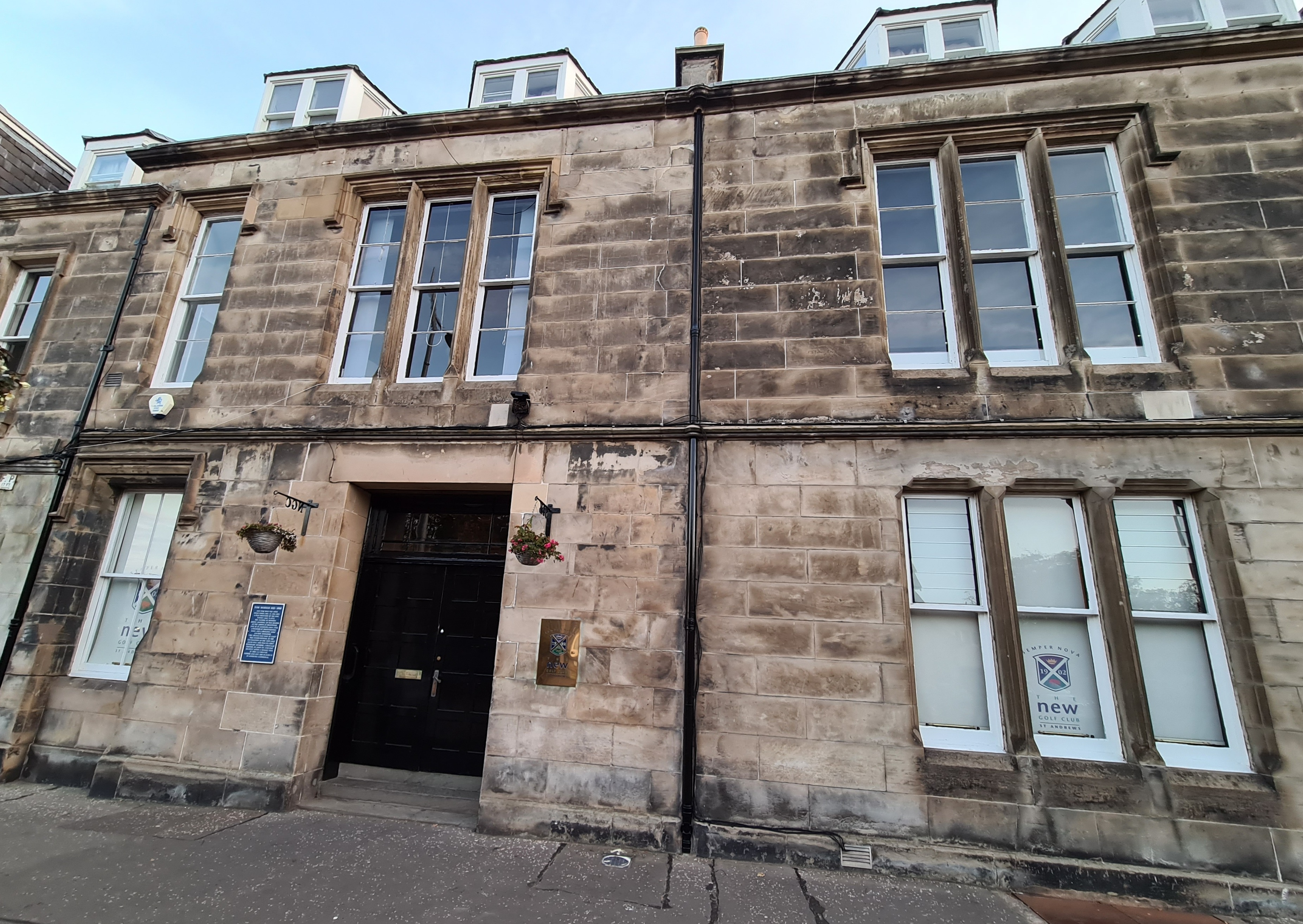
- The clubhouse, 3-5 Gibson Place, St Andrews

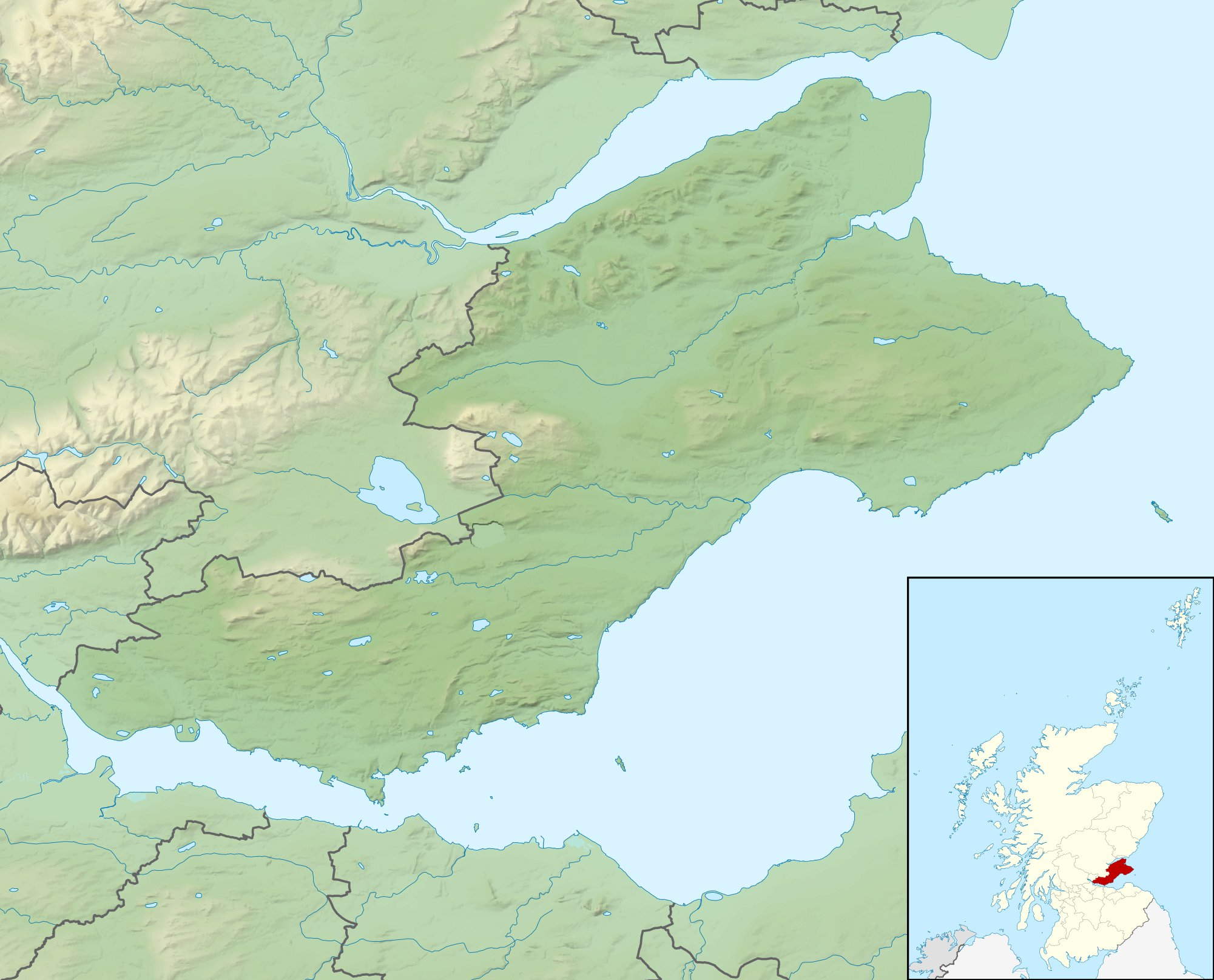
- Location within Fife
- Formation: 1902
- Headquarters: 3-5 Gibson Place, St Andrews, Scotland
- Coordinates: 56.34273°N 2.80552°W
- Members: 2,200 (2019)
- Club Secretary & General Manager: Steve Alcock
- Revenue: £416,001 (2020)
- Expenses: £359,291 (2020)
- Website: newgolfclubstandrews.co.uk

Listed Building – Category C(S)
- Official name: 1-10 Gibson Place
- Designated: 8 June 1978; 48 years ago
- Reference no.: LB40809

The New Golf Club is an exclusive golf club in St Andrews, Fife, Scotland. It is one of the three senior men's clubs in St Andrews, along with the Royal and Ancient Golf Club of St Andrews and the St Andrews Golf Club. The club was founded in 1902. The club does not own a golf course of its own, and consequently members play on the seven public links courses at the St Andrews Links including the Old Course.

== History ==
In 1821 the Cheape family had bought the St Andrews Links including the Old Course. In 1892 the St Andrews Town Council proposed that they and the Royal and Ancient Golf Club share ownership with a condition was that the course remain open to the public. However, The royal and Ancient Golf Club negotiated a price with Cheape, and in 1893, they purchased it. The Town Council were not happy with the purchase and pursued a new law in Parliament, which became the St Andrews Links Act 1894, in order to obtain the links for the people of the town.

The same men, who fought for the new law were the same men who founded The New Golf Club. During this time, the people of the town had no clubhouse, even though there were at least nine golf clubs in St Andrews. Eight local businessmen established the club in 1902, with Old Tom Morris being a supporter, having visited the club regularly. It was in the New Golf clubhouse that he had the accident which would lead to his eventual death.

== Membership ==
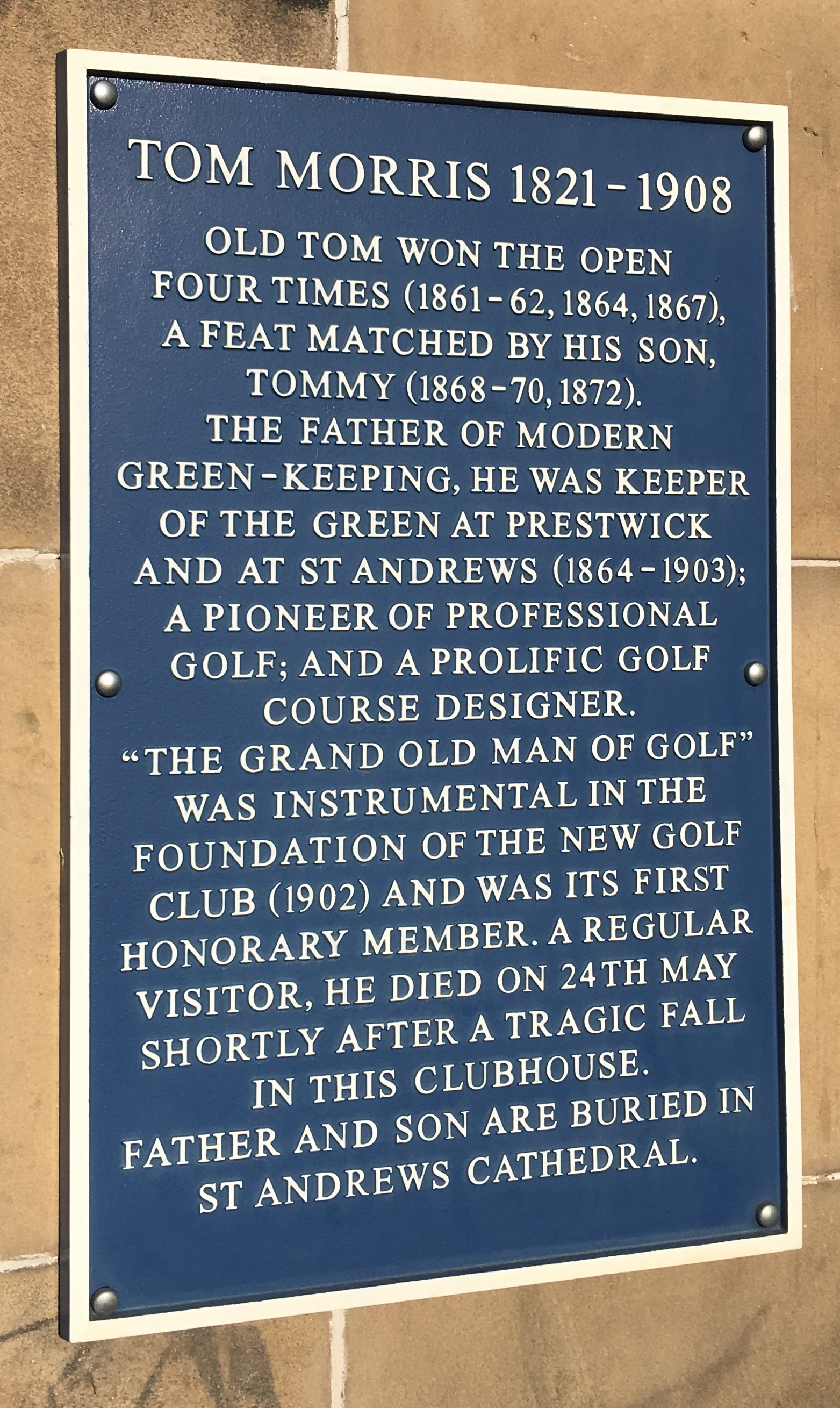
Blue plaque on The New Golf Clubhouse for Old Tom Morris

The New Golf Club does not own a golf course of its own, and as a consequence members also need to pay a subscription fee to the St Andrews Links Trust to play on the seven public links courses (the Old, Balgove, Castle, Eden, Jubilee, New, and Strathtyrum golf courses). Members of The New Golf Club can also apply for membership of the St Andrews Thistle Golf Club, along with members of The Royal and Ancient Golf Club of St Andrews and St Andrews Golf Club. In 2019 the total membership of the club was 2,200, this included 1,850 ordinary voting members. The maximum numbers of ordinary voting members is 2,000.

=== The New Golf Club tartan ===
The St Andrews New Golf Club tartan was produced for the centenary (1902–2002) of the New Club at St Andrews and is restricted to Members of the club. It comes in purple, earth and green.

=== Honorary membership ===
The New Golf Club has only ever had five honorary members in over a century, and never more than one at any one time:

- Old Tom Morris (16 June 1821 – 24 May 1908) He won 4 Open Championships. Hon. Member; 1902 – 1908.
- Sandy Herd (24 April 1868 – 18 February 1944) He won one major golf championship, the 1902 Open Championship. Hon. Member; 1938 – 1944.
- Bobby Jones (17 March 1902 – 18 December 1971) He won the Grand Slam of all four major golf tournaments; the 1930 Open Championship, the 1930 Amateur Championship, the 1930 U.S. Open, and the 1930 U.S. Amateur . Hon. Member; 1958 – 1971.
- Arnold Palmer (10 September 1929 – 25 September 2016) He won 7 major golf championships, including 2 Open Championships. Hon. Member; 1973 - 2016.
- Tom Watson (born 4 September 1949) He has won 8 major golf championships, including 5 Open Championships. Hon. Member; 2018 - date.
