= Moira Milton =

Scottish golfer

Personal information
- Full name: Moira Christine Paterson Milton
- Nationality: Scotland
- Born: 18 December 1923 Castle Douglas, Scotland
- Died: 24 January 2012 (aged 88) Wells, England

Career
- Sport: Golf
- Status: Amateur

Moira Christine Milton (née Paterson) (18 December 1923 – 24 January 2012) was a Scottish amateur golfer. She won the British Ladies Amateur in 1952, and was a member of the winning Great Britain and Ireland 1952 Curtis Cup team.

== Early life ==
Paterson was born in Castle Douglas, in Dumfries and Galloway; she was raised in Lenzie.

== Golf career ==
Paterson was a gym teacher at Kirkintilloch when she finished as runner-up in the French Women's Open Amateur Championship in 1949, and in the Scottish Women's Amateur Championship in 1951.

She toured South Africa with a group of British women golfers in 1951. Paterson won the British Ladies Amateur in 1952, and was a member of the victorious Great Britain and Ireland Curtis Cup team later in the same year. She became an honorary member of Gullane Golf Club in 1952.

She won three county women's golf championships: Dunbartonshire in 1949, East of Scotland in 1960, and Midlothian in 1962.

== Personal life ==
In 1953, Paterson married cricketer John C. Milton. She died at a nursing home in Wells in 2012, aged 88 years.
