= Panmure Golf Club =

Golf club in Angus, Scotland

Coordinates: 56.476°N 2.748°W

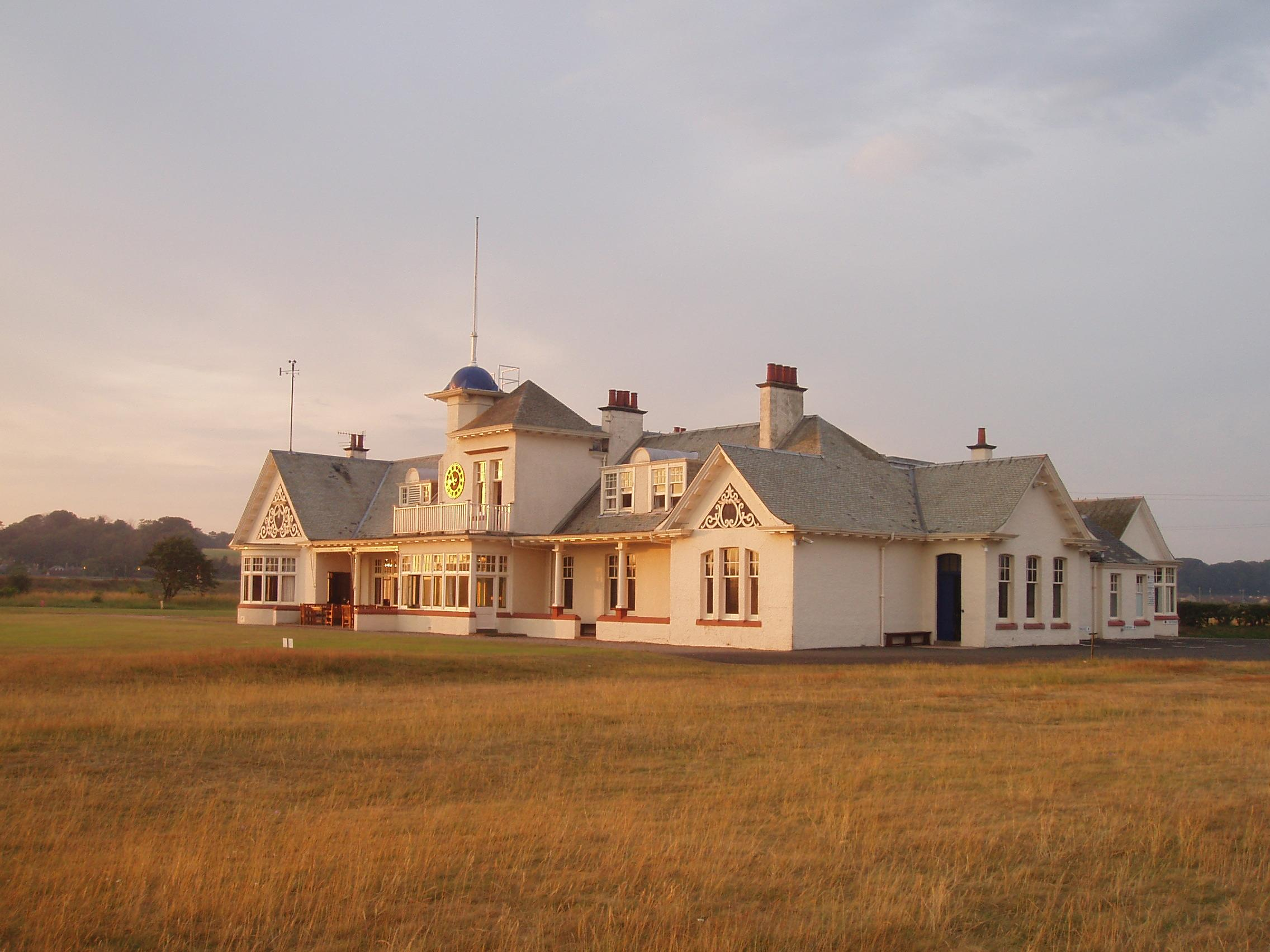
Panmure Clubhouse

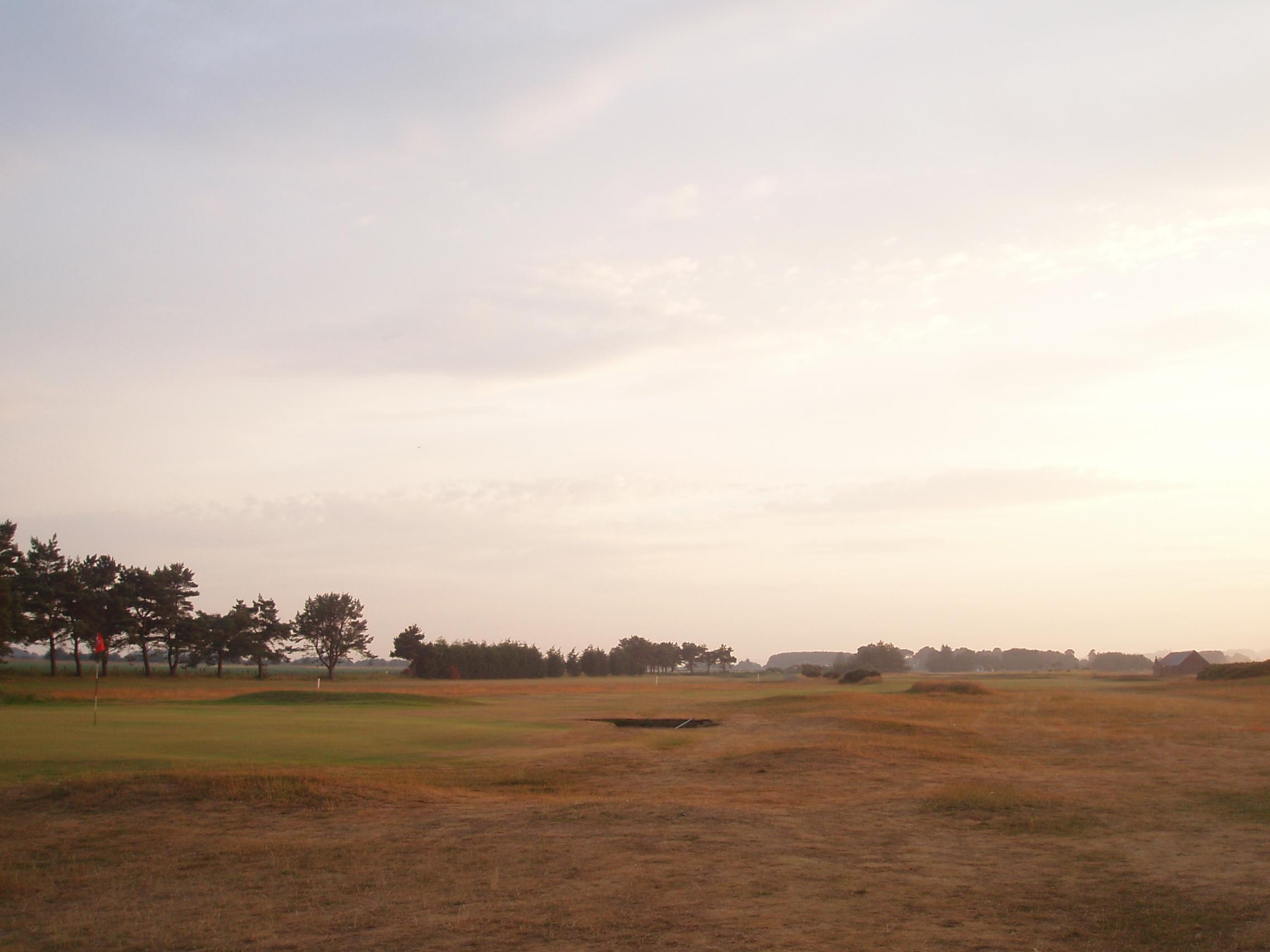
Panmure 18th hole

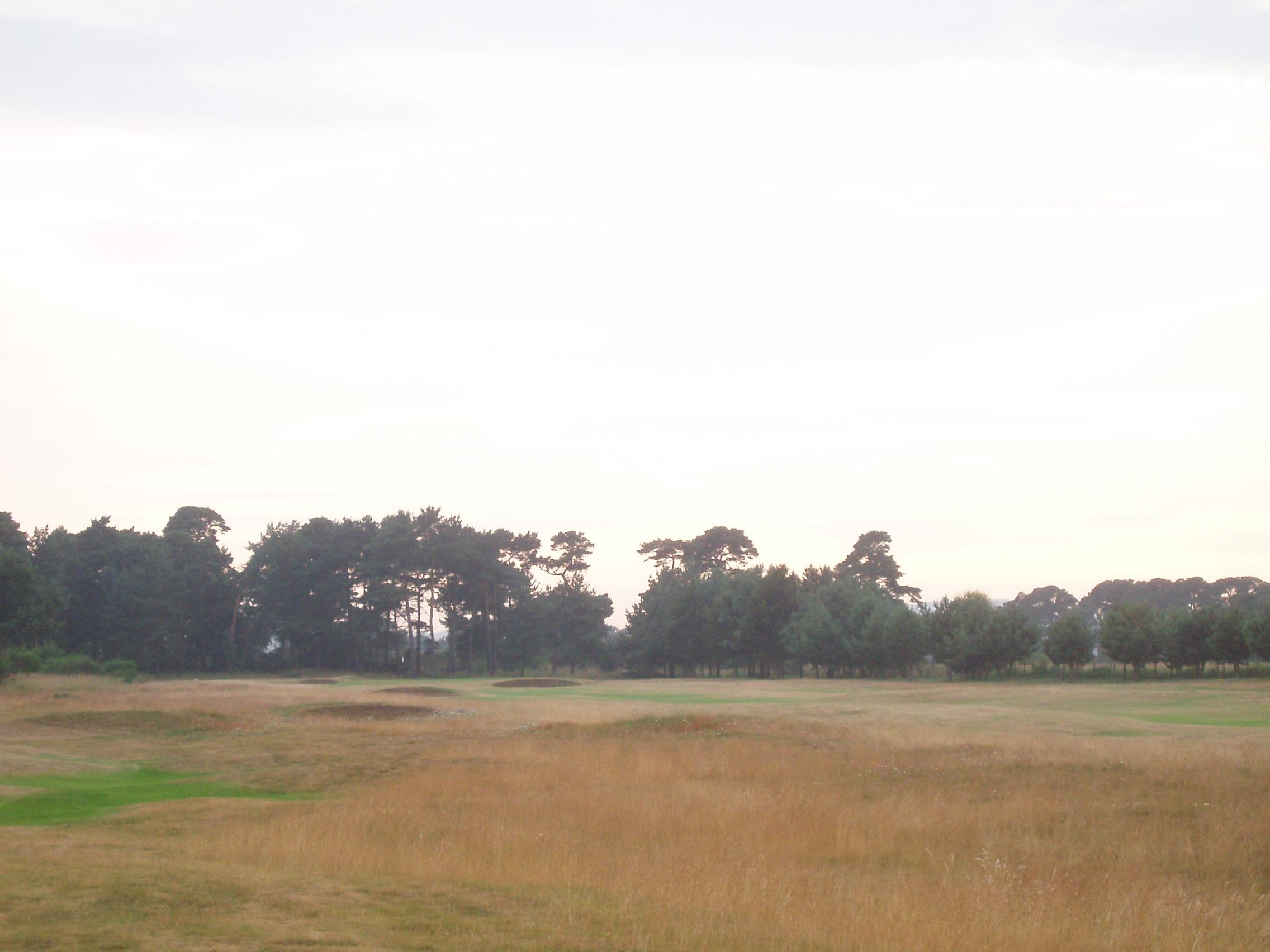
Panmure 3rd hole

Panmure Golf Club is a golf club close to the village of Barry, Angus, Scotland. It is one of the clubs that originally helped purchase the Amateur Championship trophy, and is one of the oldest golf clubs in the world, dating back to 1845. It is a private club that plays over the Barry Links, and is sometimes referred to as Barry or Panmure Barry. Due to its location next to Carnoustie it is often overlooked by visitors, and with the number of members limited to 500 it is one of the most underplayed courses in Scotland.

== The course ==
Although Panmure is a links course, it has some unusual features. The course is a mile or more from the sea, and many holes have trees which rarely come into play but create an unusual backdrop to the rolling links holes. The first and last three holes are flat, but the middle twelve holes are classic links holes. This is because the clubhouse had to be built near to a railway station, and the first and last three holes were needed to get to the land where the course was originally going to be built. It is also not a very long course at 6511 yards from the championship tees. It served as the final qualifying course for the 1999 Open Championship at Carnoustie due to the well known barry rough that flanks every fairway, making accuracy from the tee essential.

== Ben Hogan ==
Panmure is famous for being the place where Ben Hogan practiced away from the attention of the media, prior to his only Open Championship appearance at Carnoustie in 1953. On the sixth hole, he suggested that a bunker at the front right of the green would improve the hole, and one was subsequently created, known to this day as hogan's bunker. Hogan spent much of his time hitting shots to the 17th green.

== Clubhouse ==
Panmure's clubhouse is modeled spiritually on the Royal Calcutta Golf Club.

Panmure was again a final qualifying course for the 2007 Open Championship at Carnoustie, and despite being the shortest course by far, it had the highest winning score of all three qualifiers having a 36 hole score of -5, as opposed to around -9 or -10 at the other 2 courses.
