= The St Rule Club =

Sports organization

- Logo of The St Rule Club

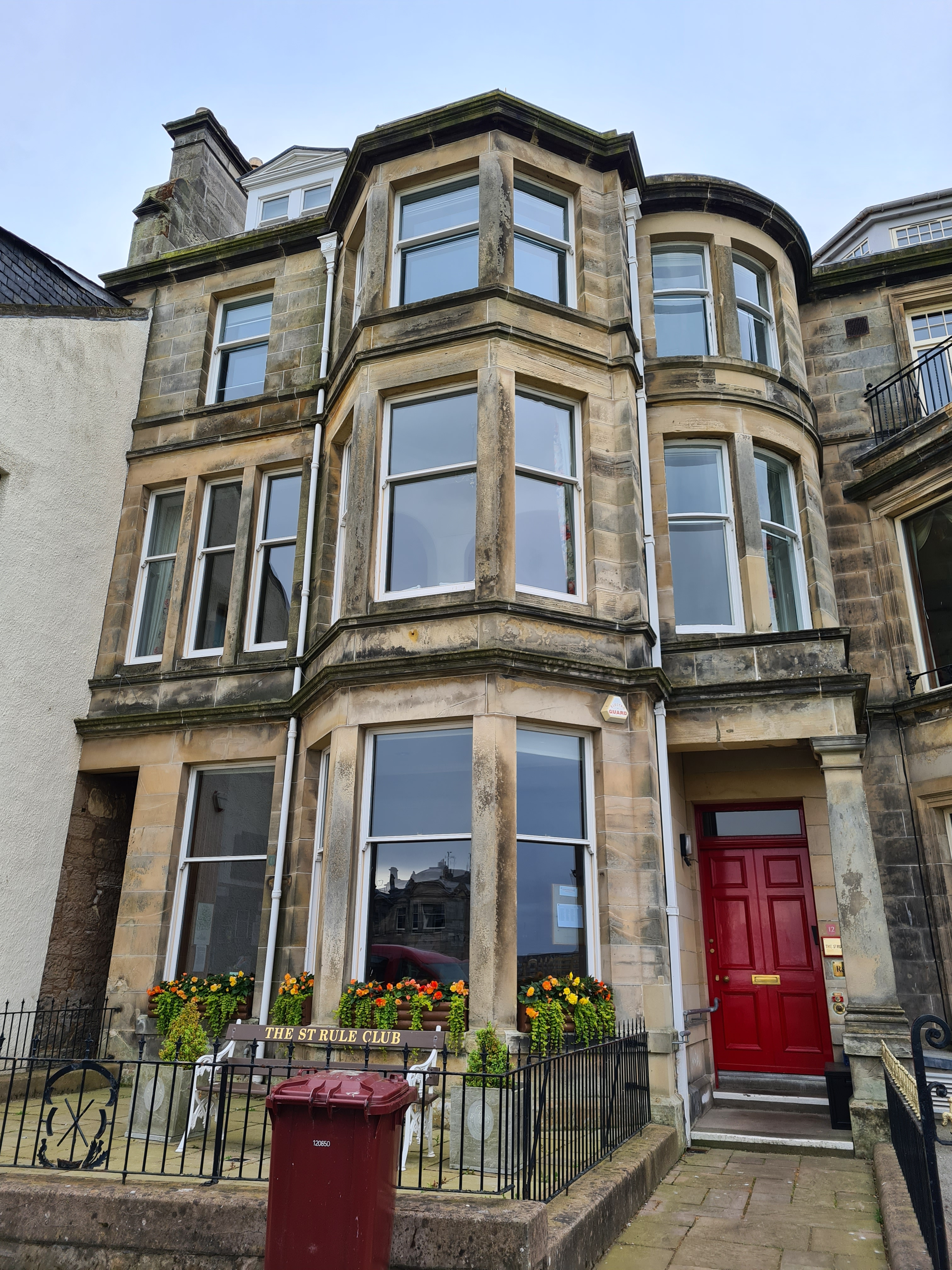
- Clubhouse of The St Rule Club, which overlooks the 18th green on the Old Course.

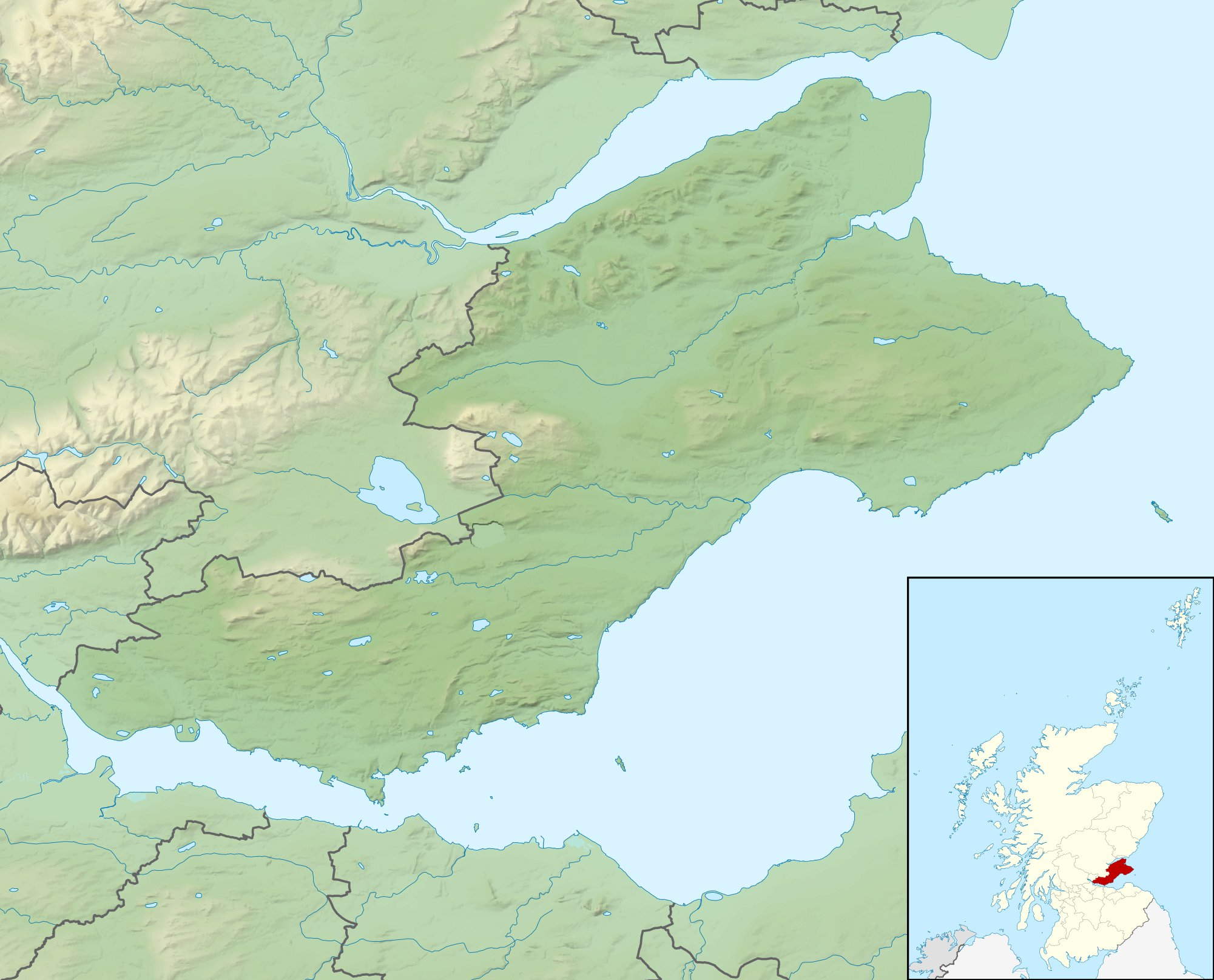
- Location within Fife
- Formation: 1898
- Headquarters: 12 The Links
- Location: St Andrews, Scotland
- Coordinates: 56.34276°N 2.80328°W
- Members: 186 (1896)
- Website: thestruleclub.co.uk

Listed Building – Category C(S)
- Official name: 12 The Links, St Rule Club with Boundary Wall and Railings
- Designated: 23 June 1999; 27 years ago
- Reference no.: LB46274

The St Rule Club is a woman's golf and social club based in St Andrews, Scotland, and was established at the end of 1896, although it was not until 1898 when the golf section was established.

It has a variety of activities for its members, which includes a golf section, a book club and it is open to members and their guests for morning coffee, lunch and afternoon tea.

The club does not own its own golf course, instead, members have playing privileges on the seven public golf courses owned by the St Andrews Links Trust, which includes the Old Course. The St Rule Trophy, forms part of the Scottish Women's Order of Merit ladies amateur competition. and is used as a qualifier for other trophies including the Curtis Cup.

== History ==
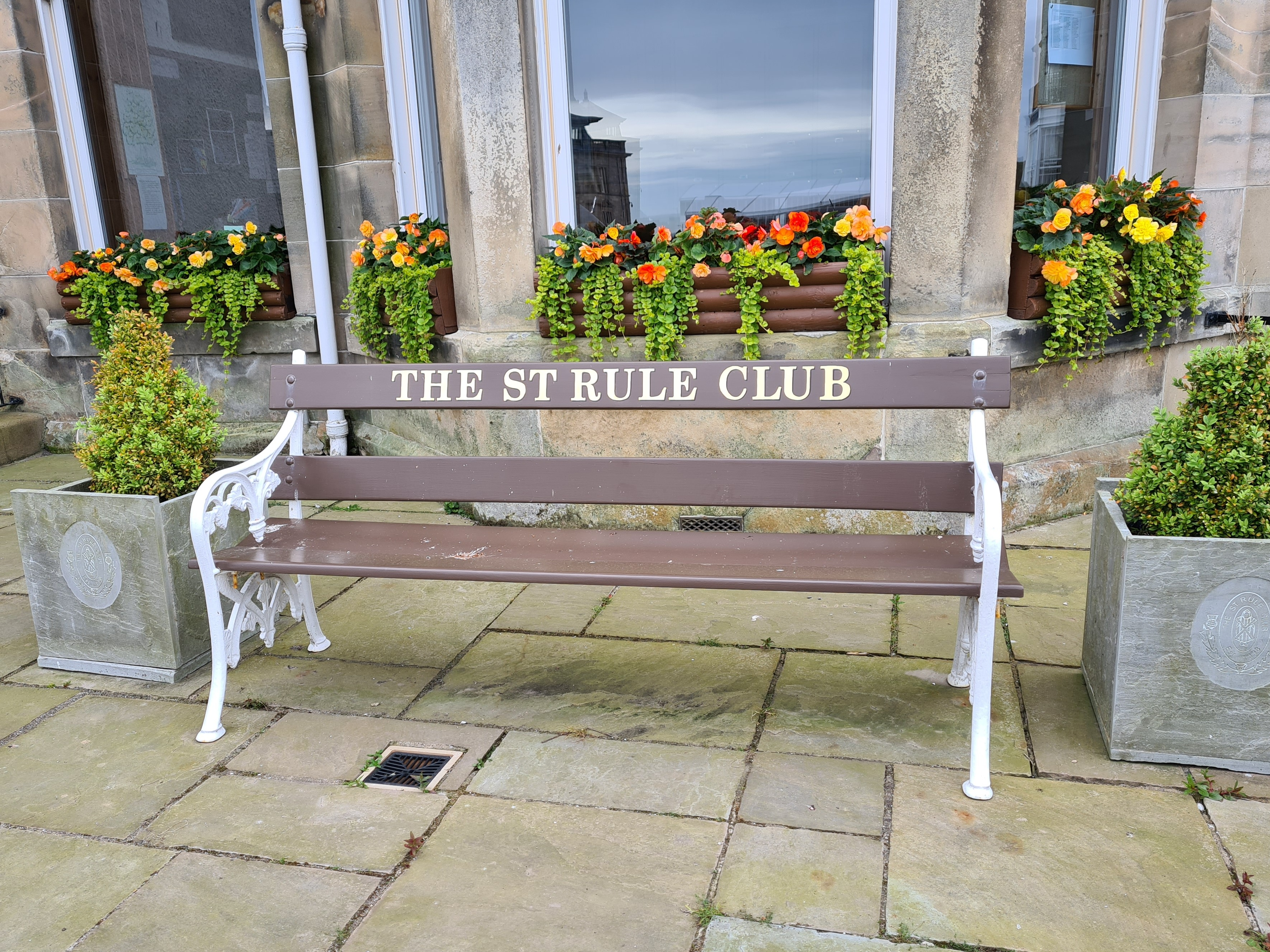
The St Rule Club chair in the front of the clubhouse

The club was established at the end of 1896. and it temporarily leased 4 Gibson Place for its clubhouse in 1897. The move to the upper floor of their current premises at 12 The Links in 1898, which also coincided with establishing a golf section within the club. The ground floor was also later leased to the club after 1906. The club bought the entire building at 12 The Links in 1923 for £3,000. The St Rule Club merged with the St Rule Golf Club in 1952. In 1999 the clubhouse became a Category C listed building.

== Golf ==
The St Rule Club does not own its own golf course, so like The Royal and Ancient Golf Club, St Andrews Golf Club, The New Golf Club, and the St Regulus Ladies Golf Club, members have playing privileges on all of the seven public golf courses on the St Andrews Links, including the Old Course. The St Rule Trophy which is played on the New Course and the Old Course was first played in 1984. It is now organised by the St Andrews Links Trust, which forms part of the Scottish Women's Order of Merit ladies amateur competition, and is used as a qualifier for other trophies including the Curtis Cup. The annual St Andrews Ladies Jubilee Open is organised jointly by the St Regulus Ladies Golf Club and The St Rule Club and is played over the Jubilee course at St Andrews Links.

== Name of club ==
The club is named after Saint Rule, also known as Saint Regulus. Legend has it that he was warned in a dream by an angel to take part of the relics of St Andrew to an unknown place in the north-west. The angel told him to stop in a place in Fife, where he built the St Rule's Church that housed the saint's relics, and which later became St Andrews.
