= Girls Home Internationals =

Amateur team golf competition

Tournament information
- Established: 1969
- Course: Downfield Golf Club (2019)
- Format: Team match play
- Month played: August

Current champion
- England

The Girls Home Internationals was an amateur team golf championship for girls between the four Home Nations. Ireland was represented by the whole island of Ireland.The event was organised by The R&A. The inaugural event was held in 1969 and the venue cycled between the four nations. The winning team received the Stroyan Cup. Originally it was played immediately before, and at the same venue, as the Girls Amateur Championship. However it was later held as a separate event. In 2021 the match was replaced by a combined Girls and Boys Home Internationals.

A match between Scotland and England girls had been played since 1935 while Ireland and Wales had also played earlier matches.

== Format ==
In its final format, the championship was played over three days with the four teams competing against each other in individual matches. A match consists of three foursomes and six singles each over 18 holes. The scores were calculated by team results with each team scoring one point for a team win and half a point for a halved match. Ties were resolved by the number of individual matches won. Each team had 7 players, although up to 2015 there were teams of 8.

== History ==
From 1969 to 1975 the event was played on the Monday and Tuesday before the Girls Amateur Championship, with matches consisting of 7 singles matches over 18 holes. Two matches were played on the Monday and one on the Tuesday. From 1976 to 1978 it was held on the previous Thursday and Friday before returning to Monday and Tuesday in 1979. In 1990 the event was expanded to three days matches consisting of three foursomes and six singles.

== Results ==
Year	Venue	Location	Winner	Score	Ref.
2020	Royal St David's	Wales	Cancelled		
2019	Downfield	Scotland	England	2½ points	
2018	Ballybunion	Ireland	England	2½ points	
2017	Little Aston	England	England	3 points	
2016	Conwy	Wales	Ireland	2½ points	
2015	Lanark	Scotland	England	3 points	
2014	Donabate	Ireland	England	3 points	
2013	St Annes Old Links	England	England	2 points	
2012	Radyr	Wales	England	2½ points	
2011	Gullane No.2	Scotland	England	2½ points	
2010	Bangor	Ireland	England	3 points	
2009	Fairhaven	England	England	3 points	
2008	Panmure	Scotland	England	3 points	
2007	Southerndown	Wales	Scotland	3 points	
2006	Portstewart	Ireland	Scotland	3 points	
2005	Worplesdon	England	England	2 points	
2004	Strathaven	Scotland	England	2 points	
2003	Pyle & Kenfig	Wales	England	3 points	
2002	Hermitage	Ireland	England	3 points	
2001	Brough	England	England	3 points	
2000	Downfield	Scotland	England	3 points	
1999	High Post	England	Wales	3 points	
1998	Mullingar	Ireland	Scotland	2 points	
1997	Forfar	Scotland	England	3 points	
1996	Formby Ladies	England	England	3 points	
1995	Northop Country Park	Wales	England	3 points	
1994	Gog Magog	England	Scotland	2½ points	
1993	Helensburgh	Scotland	Scotland	3 points	
1992	Moseley	England	Scotland	3 points	
1991	Whitchurch	Wales	England	2½ points	
1990	Penrith	England	England	3 points	
1989	Carlisle	England	England	3 points	
1988	Pyle & Kenfig	Wales	England	2½ points	
1987	Barnham Broom	England	England	3 points	
1986	West Kilbride	Scotland	England	3 points	
1985	Hesketh	England	England	3 points	
1984	Llandudno (Maesdu)	Wales	Scotland	3 points	
1983	Alwoodley	England	England	3 points	
1982	Edzell	Scotland	England	3 points	
1981	Woodbridge	England	England	3 points	
1980	Wrexham	Wales	England	2½ points	
1979	Edgbaston	England	England	2½ points	
1978	Largs	Scotland	England	3 points	
1977	Formby	England	England	2½ points	
1976	Pyle & Kenfig	Wales	Scotland	3 points	
1975	Henbury	England	England	2½ points	
1974	Dunbar	Scotland	England	3 points	
1973	Northamptonshire County	England	Scotland	3 points	
1972	Royal Norwich	England	Scotland	3 points	
1971	North Berwick	Scotland	England	3 points	
1970	North Wales	Wales	England	3 points	
1969	Ilkley	England	England	3 points	

== Earlier England–Scotland matches ==
Before the Girls Home Internationals was founded, an annual match had been played between England and Scotland since 1935. It was played immediately before the Girls Amateur Championship at the same venue.

The first match was held on Monday 2 September 1935 at Stoke Poges, before the Girls Amateur Championship. There were 7 singles matches, with Scotland winning 5 and England 2. Extra holes were played to ensure a result. Scotland won all four matches that were played before World War II. The match restarted in 1949 and was won first the first time by England. There were just 5 singles matches in 1949 and 1950 but the number returned to 7 from 1951. Foursomes matches were introduced in 1954, the match consisting of three foursomes and six singles. Only five singles matches were played in 1955 with seven played in 1959. In 1960 the match was extended to four foursomes and eight singles and resulted in a 6–6 tie. Extra holes were dropped from 1964. In 1965 the format returned to the earlier three foursomes and six singles, and resulted in a 4½–4½ tie. In 1966, at Troon Portland, Scotland won for the first time since 1938. In 1968 at Leven, the final match played before the start of the Home Internationals, resulted in the third tie in the match, 4½–4½.

Year	Venue	Location	Winner	Score	Ref.
1968	Leven	Scotland	Tie	4½–4½	
1967	Liphook	England	England	7–2	
1966	Troon Portland	Scotland	Scotland	5½–3½	
1965	Formby Ladies	England	Tie	4½–4½	
1964	Camberley Heath	England	England	9½–2½	
1963	Gullane No. 2	Scotland	England	9–3	
1962	Alnmouth	England	England	9–3	
1961	Beaconsfield	England	England	9–3	
1960	Kilmarnock (Barassie)	Scotland	Tie	6–6	
1959	Woolaton Park	England	England	7–3	
1958	Cotswold Hills	England	England	7–2	
1957	North Berwick	Scotland	England	8–1	
1956	Seaton Carew	England	England	9–0	
1955	Beaconsfield	England	England	7–1	
1954	West Kilbride	Scotland	England	8–1	
1953	Woodhall Spa	England	England	4–3	
1952	Stoke Poges	England	England	4–3	
1951	Gullane	Scotland	England	6–1	
1950	Formby	England	England	3–2	
1949	Beaconsfield	England	England	4–1	
1939–1948: No tournaments
1938	Stoke Poges	England	Scotland	4–3	
1937	Stoke Poges	England	Scotland	6–1	
1936	Stoke Poges	England	Scotland	4–3	
1935	Stoke Poges	England	Scotland	5–2	

== Earlier Ireland–Wales matches ==
Ireland and Wales played their first girls international at Llandudno in August 1965, Wales winning 5–4. A second match was played on the Valley course at Royal Portrush in 1966, Ireland winning. In 1967 and 1968 the match was played on the same day as the England–Scotland match. Ireland won 7–2 in 1967 and 6½–2½ in 1968. The teams competed for the Swansea Spoon, later presented to the runners-up in the Home Internationals.
