= Beaconsfield Golf Club =

Golf club in Buckinghamshire, England

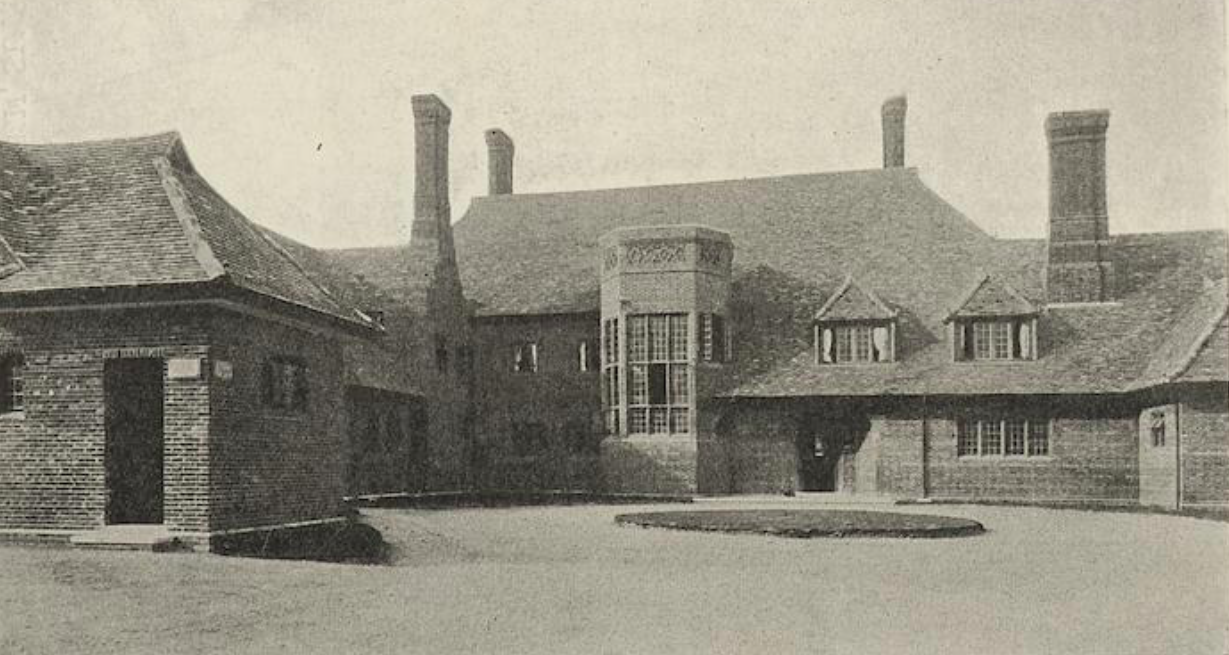
- Golf Club House at Beaconsfield, 1914

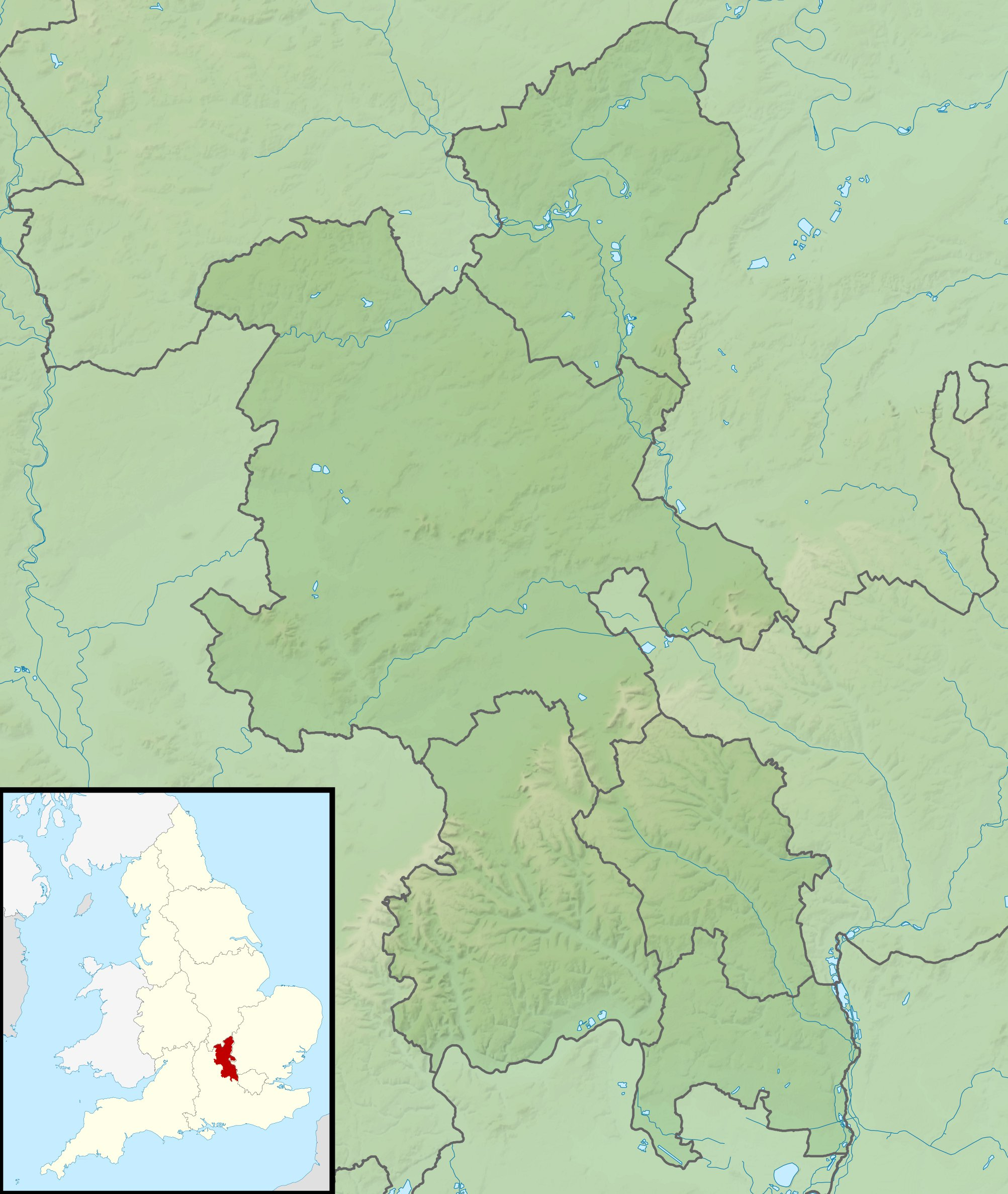
- Location within Buckinghamshire
- 51.61021°N 0.61783°W

Club information
- Location: Seer Green, Buckinghamshire, England
- Established: 1902
- Tota holes: 18
- Website: www.beaconsfieldgolfclub.co.uk

Beaconsfield Golf Club is a golf club, located in Seer Green, Buckinghamshire, England. It is located about 1 mile east of Beaconsfield. The club was established in 1902; in 1914, the club moved to a new course which was designed by Harry Colt.
