= North Berwick Golf Club =

Golf club in Scotland

The North Berwick Golf Club (NBGC) is a golf club located at North Berwick, East Lothian, founded in 1832. It is the 13th oldest golf club in the world and only St Andrews hosts a club which has played continuously over the same course for longer. Although the NBGC was the first club in the world to allow female members, full membership rights were only granted to ladies in 2005. The club is based at the North Berwick West Links golf course.

The West Links Course at North Berwick is a true links course located on the edge of the Firth of Forth. It is a championship course that has hosted many events over the years, including Final Qualifying for The Open Championship and the men's and women's Amateur Championships. Golf has been played over the historic West Links course since the 17th century. The 15th hole on the West Links, known as Redan, has been replicated at many courses around the world, with architects Charles B. Macdonald and Seth Raynor being most associated with the design.

== Course Layout ==
Hole	Name	Yards	Par	Hole	Name	Yards	Par
1	Point Garry (Out)	342	4	10	Eastward Ho!	172	3
2	Sea	433	4	11	Bos'ns Locker	549	5
3	Trap	459	4	12	Bass	402	4
4	Carlekemp	177	3	13	Pit	400	4
5	Bunkershill	372	4	14	Perfection	375	4
6	Quarry	161	3	15	Redan	189	3
7	Eil Burn	366	4	16	Gate	378	4
8	Linkshouse	509	5	17	Point Garry (In)	426	4
9	Mizzentop	522	5	18	Home	277	4
Out		3,341	36	In		3,168	35
Source:				Total		6,509	71
