= Elizabeth Price (golfer) =

English amateur golfer (1923–2008)

Personal information
- Nationality: England
- Born: 17 January 1923
- Died: 23 May 2008 (aged 85)

Career
- Sport: Golf
- Status: Amateur

Elizabeth Price (later Price-Fisher, 17 January 1923 – 23 May 2008) was an English amateur golfer. She won the Ladies' British Open Amateur Championship in 1959 and twice a losing finalist. She was three times runner-up in the English Women's Amateur Championship and won the Spalding Women's Open Stroke Play twice. She played in six successive Curtis Cup matches from 1950 to 1960.

== Golf career ==
As a 15-year-old, Price played in the 1938 Girls Amateur Championship at Stoke Poges, winning her opening match before losing in the second round. In 1947 she reached the final of the first post-war English Women's Amateur Championship, at Ganton, losing to Mollie Wallis in the 36-hole final. The match was level after the morning round. Price was 3 up after 23 holes before Wallis recovered to level the match after 27 holes and then pulled ahead to win 3 and 1. In 1948 she made her debut for En9gland in the Women's Home Internationals at Royal Lytham. England won the title thanks to a narrow 5–4 win over Scotland on the opening day, Price winning her match against Charlotte Beddows at the 20th hole. Later in 1948 she reached the quarter-finals of the English championship at Hayling before losing to Gillian Rudgard.

Price reached the semi-finals of the 1950 Ladies' British Open Amateur Championship, losing 5&3 to Jessie Valentine, a performance which saw her selected for the Curtis Cup team at the Country Club of Buffalo in September. She represented England in a match against a team of visiting Australian women, winning her singles match. In the 1950 Curtis Cup, the Americans won 7 matches to 1, with one match halved, Price won her foursomes match on the opening day, playing with Frances Stephens, but lost in the singles on the final day. The team later played a Canadian team, Price winning both her matches in an 8–2 victory.

Price was selected for the 1952 Curtis Cup team at Muirfield. The British team took a 2–1 lead on the first day, Price winning her foursomes match, playing with Jean Donald. The singles match were tied 3–3, to give Britain their first Curtis Cup win. Playing in the final singles match, Price beat Grace DeMoss 3&2 to win the cup. She was voted the 1952 golfer of the year by the Association of Golf Writers. Price reached the quarter-finals of the 1953 Ladies' British Open Amateur Championship, losing to the eventual winner, Marlene Stewart. She was part of the British team that won the Commonwealth tournament at Formby in early July. The other teams were Canada, New Zealand and a British juniors team. In October she made her debut for Great Britain & Ireland in the matches against Belgium and France.

In 1954 Price reached the final of both the Ladies' British Open Amateur Championship at Ganton and the English Women's Amateur Championship at Woodhall Spa, losing both times to Frances Stephens. At Ganton, Stephens won 4&3 but the match at Woodhall Spa went to extra holes, Stephens winning with a birdie at the 37th hole. In June, Price was selected for the 1954 Curtis Cup team at Merion Golf Club in September. The Americans won by 6 matches to 3, Price losing both her matches. The team had earlier won a match against a Canadian team, Price winning her singles match but losing in the foursomes. Price won the 1955 Spalding Women's Open Stroke Play at Walton Heath, 23 strokes ahead of the runner-up, Gabrielle Keiller. Later in the year she reached the final of the English Women's Amateur Championship at Moortown, but lost for the second successive year to Frances Smith.

At the end of March 1956, Price was selected for the Curtis Cup at Prince's in June. Britain won the match 5–4, their second win in the event. Price won her foursomes match, playing with Frances Smith, and beat Jane Nelson 7&6 in the singles. Late in the year she was runner-up in the Spalding Women's Open Stroke Play at Moor Park, three strokes behind Marley Spearman. In 1957 she reached the semi-finals of the Ladies' British Open Amateur Championship at Gleneagles before losing 3&1 to Jessie Valentine. She reached the final of the German open championship, losing to Lieselotte Strenger at the 39th hole.

Playing with Marley Spearman, Price was a joint-winner of the 1958 Kayser Bondor Foursomes. She reached the final of the Ladies' British Open Amateur Championship at Hunstanton, losing again to Jessie Valentine, by one hole. It was her fifth defeat in the final of a major championship, having losing twice in the British championship and three times in the English championship. In May she was one of the first four players selected for the 1958 Curtis Cup team. The match in August was tied, with Britain retaining the cup as the previous holders. Price won her foursomes match, playing with Angela Bonallack, but lost her singles match to Anne Quast.

If 1959 Price won the Ladies' British Open Amateur Championship at The Berkshire, beating Belle McCorkindale in the final. Price was two down with two to play but won both holes and then took the title at the first extra hole. The previous day Price had won her quarter-final match at the 20th hole and only beat Philomena Garvey at the 18th hole in the semi-finals. In October she won the Spalding Women's Open Stroke Play at Worthing, a stroke ahead of Bridget Jackson. Earlier in the year she had played for Great Britain in the first edition of the Commonwealth Trophy at St Andrews.

Price make her final Curtis Cup appearance in 1960 at Lindrick. The United States regained the cup with Price winning her foursomes match, playing again with Angela Bonallack, and halved her match in the singles against Barbara McIntire. In six Curtis Cup contests, she won seven matches, lost four and halved one, winning five of her six foursomes matches. In 1961 Price won the Alberta amateur title.

== Personal life ==
She married Terence Fisher, a Canadian, in February 1962. She was the women's golf correspondent of The Daily Telegraph from 1974 to 1986. She died in May 2008

== Team appearances ==
- Curtis Cup (representing Great Britain & Ireland): 1950, 1952 (winners), 1954, 1956 (winners), 1958 (tied), 1960
- Canada–Great Britain match (representing Great Britain & Ireland): 1950 (winners), 1954 (winners)
- Commonwealth tournament (representing Great Britain & Ireland): 1953 (winners)
- Vagliano Trophy (representing Great Britain & Ireland): 1953 (winners), 1955 (winners), 1957 (winners), 1959 (winners)
- Belgium–Great Britain match (representing Great Britain & Ireland): 1953 (winners), 1955 (winners), 1957 (winners)
- Commonwealth Trophy (representing Great Britain): 1959 (winners)
- Women's Home Internationals (representing England): 1948 (winners), 1951, 1952, 1953 (winners), 1954 (winners), 1955, 1956, 1957, 1958 (winners), 1959 (winners), 1960 (winners)
