= Bridget Jackson =

English amateur golfer (born 1936)

Personal information
- Full name: Barbara Amy Bridget Jackson
- Nationality: England
- Born: 10 July 1936 (age 90) Birmingham, England

Career
- Sport: Golf
- Status: Amateur

Barbara Amy Bridget Jackson MBE (born 10 July 1936) is an English amateur golfer. She won the 1954 Girls Amateur Championship, the 1956 English Women's Amateur Championship and the 1967 Canadian Women's Amateur. She played in three Curtis Cup matches, 1958, 1964 and 1968.

== Golf career ==
Jackson represented England in the 1954 England–Scotland girls match at West Kilbride and then won the subsequent Girls Amateur Championship, beating Dolores Winsor at the 20th hole of the final. Jackson had holed a 4-yard putt at the 18th hole to take the match to extra holes.

In 1955, Jackson made her debut in the Women's Home Internationals at Royal Portrush, and the following week reached the semi-finals of the Ladies' British Open Amateur Championship, losing 3&2 to Jessie Valentine. Jackson was selected as part of a British women's team that toured Australia and New Zealand in the second half of 1955. Because many of the senior players were unavailable, the team turned into a team of five juniors, aged between 18 and 21. The tour was such a success that the team was awarded the Association of Golf Writers trophy, the first time a team had won the award. Jackson was not included in the 1956 Curtis Cup team, which was announced at the end of March, being selected as first reserve. In August she won the German open championship, beating Jacqueline Gordon 8&7 in the final. The following month she won the English Women's Amateur Championship at Hunstanton, beating Ruth Ferguson 2&1 in the final. In October 1957 she make her debut for a British team, playing against Belgium and then, a few days later, against France in the Vagliano Trophy.

In 1958, Jackson was not in the original team of seven selected for the Curtis Cup at Brae Burn Country Club, being first reserve. However, Philomena Garvey withdrew in protest against the Union Jack, the national flag of the United Kingdom, being the sole emblem on the team team blazers, and Jackson gained a place. 1958 Curtis Cup was tied, with Britain retaining the cup as the previous holders. Jackson lost both her matches. Later in 1958 she reached the final of the English Women's Amateur Championship at Formby, losing 3&2 to Angela Bonallack. In 1959, she played for Great Britain in the first edition of the Commonwealth Trophy at St Andrews. Later in the year she was runner-up in the Spalding Women's Open Stroke Play at Worthing, a stroke behind of Elizabeth Price, having led for much of the event.

Jackson was not chosen for the 1960 Curtis Cup team, which was announced in early April, being selected as first reserve as she had been in 1956 and 1958. Later in 1960, with Michael Burgess, she won the Worplesdon Mixed Foursomes beating Veronica and John Beharrell in the final. In early 1962, with Jean Anderson, she won the Kayser Bondor Foursomes. In 1963 she won the Astor Prince's Trophy by three strokes from Angela Bonallack.

In 1964, Jackson reached the semi-finals of the English Women's Amateur Championship at Royal Lytham, losing by one hole to Mary Everard. She was selected for Curtis Cup team at Royal Porthcawl, the first to have two sets of 18-hole matches. She played with Susan Armitage in both sets of the foursomes matches, losing both matches. In the singles she beat Carol Sorenson but lost to Peggy Conley. The contest was much closer than that in 1962 with the teams level at the start of the final round of singles matches. Two weeks later Jackson reached the final of the Ladies' British Open Amateur Championship at Prince's, losing to Carol Sorenson at the 37th hole. Jackson had missed a 5-foot putt at the previous hole that would have won the match. She played for England in the 1964 Espirito Santo Trophy, when the four home nations competed separately.

In 1965, she again reached the semi-finals of the English Women's Amateur Championship, played at Whittington Barracks, losing 2&1 to Gillian Cheetham. Later in the year she was runner-up in the Astor Prince's Trophy, 8 strokes behind Marley Spearman. Playing with Vivien Saunders, Jackson won the 1967 Avia Foursomes, She reached the semi-finals of the English championship at Alwoodley, but lost at that stage for the third time in four years, this time to Margaret Pickard. Later in 1967 she played for Great Britain in the Commonwealth Trophy in Canada and made her final appearance for Great Britain & Ireland in the Vagliano Trophy. The team stayed in Canada after the Commonwealth Trophy to compete in the Canadian Women's Amateur, which Jackson won, beating Marilyn Palmer in the final at the 37th hole.

Jackson made her final appearance in the Curtis Cup in 1968 at Royal County Down. She was not selected for either of the foursomes sessions. In the singles she halved her match against Peggy Conley and lost to Phyllis Preuss. The team led after the first day but the United States had the better of the second day and won by three points. In three Curtis Cup contests, she won one match, lost six and halved one.

In 1987, Jackson was runner-up in the Ladies' Senior British Open Amateur Championship at Copt Heath, four strokes behind Odile Semelaigne.

Jackson was also a golf administrator. She was chair of the English Ladies Golf Association in 1971 and President from 1993 to 1995. She was President of the Ladies Golf Union from 1998 to 2001 and became an Honorary Vice-President in 2003. She was the captain and also the selector of a number of British and English teams.

== Personal life ==
In the 2003 Birthday Honours she was named a Member of the Order of the British Empire for "services to ladies' golf". In 2017 she became an Honorary Member of the Royal and Ancient Golf Club of St Andrews.

== Team appearances ==
- Curtis Cup (representing Great Britain & Ireland): 1958 (tied), 1964, 1968
- Vagliano Trophy (representing Great Britain & Ireland): 1957 (winners), 1959 (winners), 1963 (winners), 1965, 1967
- Belgium–Great Britain match (representing Great Britain & Ireland): 1957 (winners)
- Commonwealth Trophy (representing Great Britain): 1959 (winners), 1967 (winners)
- Espirito Santo Trophy (representing England): 1964
- Women's Home Internationals (representing England): 1955, 1956, 1957, 1958 (winners), 1959 (winners), 1963 (winners), 1964 (winners), 1965 (winners), 1966 (winners)
- England–Scotland girls match (representing England): 1954 (winners)
