= Janette Wright =

Scottish amateur golfer (born 1935)

Personal information
- Full name: Janette Sneddon Wright
- Nationality: Scotland
- Born: 7 January 1935 (age 91) Glasgow, Scotland

Career
- Sport: Golf
- Status: Amateur

Janette Sneddon Wright (née Robertson, born 7 January 1935) is a Scottish amateur golfer. She won the Scottish Women's Amateur Championship in 1959, 1960, 1961 and 1973. She was in four Curtis Cup teams, in 1954, 1956, 1958 and 1960.

== Golf career ==
Wright won the Girls Amateur Championship in 1950 beating Ann Phillips 5&4 in the final. She was a finalist again in 1951, losing to Jane Redgate at the 19th hole. She played in the England–Scotland girls match each year from 1950 to 1953. In 1952 she made her senior debut in the Women's Home Internationals. She won her three matches with Scotland retaining the title. Wright was part of the British juniors team that played in the Commonwealth tournament at Formby in early July 1953. The other teams were Britain, Canada and New Zealand.

Wright was one of the last two women selected for the 1954 Curtis Cup team at Merion Golf Club. The Americans won by 6 matches to 3. Wright lost her foursomes match but beat Joyce Ziske in the singles. The team had earlier won a match against a Canadian team, Wright halving her singles match and winning in the foursomes. Wright was selected as part of a British women's team that toured Australia and New Zealand in the second half of 1955. Because many of the senior players were unavailable, the team turned into a team of five juniors, aged between 18 and 21. The tour was such a success that the team was awarded the Association of Golf Writers trophy, the first time a team had won the award. Earlier in 1955 she reached the semi-finals of the British Ladies Amateur, losing narrowly to Barbara Romack. At the end of March 1956, Wright was again selected for the Curtis Cup team. Britain won the match 5–4, their second win in the event, although Wright lost both her foursomes and singles matches.

Playing with Angela Bonallack, Wright was a joint-winner of the 1958 Kayser Bondor Foursomes. She also reached the final of the Scottish Women's Amateur Championship for the first time, losing by one hole to Dorothea Sommerville in the 36-hole final. In May she was one of the first four players selected for the 1958 Curtis Cup team. The match in August was tied, with Britain retaining the cup as the previous holders. Wright won both her matches. In 1959 she won the Scottish Women's Amateur Championship for the first time, beating Belle McCorkindale 6&5 in the final. Playing with future husband Innes Wright, they won the Worplesdon Mixed Foursomes in October 1959.

Wright was selected for the 1960 Curtis Cup team, her final appearance in the contest. The United States regained the cup with Wright losing both her matches, although she took Anne Quast to the 36th hole in the singles. Wright retained the Scottish Women's Amateur Championship later in 1960, beating Dorothea Sommerville in the final. In early 1961, playing with Jessie Valentine, she won the Kayser Bondor Foursomes by four strokes. She also won the Scottish Women's Amateur Championship for the third successive year, on the Old Course at St Andrews. In 1970 she reached the semi-finals of the British Ladies Amateur for the second time, losing to Dinah Oxley. In 1973 she won the Scottish Amateur for the fourth time, again on the Old Course. That win saw her return to the Scottish team in the 1973 European Ladies' Team Championship and in the Women's Home Internationals, for the final time.

== Personal life ==
In 1960 she married Innes Wright, a Scottish amateur golf international. They had a daughter Pamela, who is a professional golfer.

Innes Wright became a professional in early 1963 when in his late-20s. In his first important professional event, the 1963 News of the World Matchplay at Turnberry, he reached the semi-finals before losing to fellow-Scot John MacDonald. The previous day he had beaten Tony Grubb in the morning and then Brian Huggett in the afternoon, a match that went to nine extra holes. He later became the professional at Aboyne Golf Club.

== Team appearances ==
- Curtis Cup (representing Great Britain & Ireland): 1954, 1956 (winners), 1958 (tied), 1960
- Vagliano Trophy (representing Great Britain & Ireland): 1957 (winners), 1959 (winners), 1961 (winners), 1963 (winners)
- Commonwealth Trophy (representing Great Britain): 1959 (winners)
- Commonwealth tournament (representing British juniors): 1953
- European Ladies' Team Championship (representing Scotland): 1965, 1973
- Women's Home Internationals (representing Scotland): 1952 (winners), 1953, 1954, 1955 (winners), 1956 (winners), 1957 (winners), 1958, 1959, 1960, 1961 (winners), 1963, 1965, 1966, 1967 (joint winners), 1973
- England–Scotland girls match (representing Scotland): 1950, 1951, 1952, 1953
