= Angela Bonallack =

English amateur golfer (1937–2022)

Personal information
- Full name: Angela Ward, Lady Bonallack
- Nationality: England
- Born: 7 April 1937 Birchington-on-Sea, Kent, England
- Died: 1 July 2022 (aged 85)
- Spouse: Michael Bonallack

Career
- Sport: Golf
- Status: Amateur

Angela, Lady Bonallack (née Ward; 7 April 1937 – 1 July 2022) was an English amateur golfer. She was twice a finalist in the Ladies' British Open Amateur Championship and won the English Women's Amateur Championship in 1958 and 1963. She played in six successive Curtis Cup matches from 1956 to 1966. She was married to Michael Bonallack.

== Early life ==
In 1937, Bonallack was born in Birchington-on-Sea, England, the daughter of Harry and Audrey Ward. Harry was a property developer and was later the Mayor of Margate.

In 1953, at the age of 16, Bonallack played for England in the England–Scotland girls match at Woodhall Spa. That year, she also reached the final of the Girls Amateur Championship, losing 3&2 to Susan Hill.

In 1955, she played in a number of European events, winning the German and Swedish championship and losing to Jeanne Bisgood in the final of the Norwegian championship. On her return she won the Girls Amateur Championship at Beaconsfield, beating Alison Gardner 5 & 4 in the final.

== Golf career ==
After a series of trials Bonallack was selected to play in the 1956 Curtis Cup match at her home club, Prince's. She wasn't selected for the foursomes matches on the opening day but won her singles match on the final day, beating Mary Ann Downey. Her win was one of four singles wins that gave Great Britain & Ireland a narrow victory. The following week she reached the final of French championship, losing narrowly to Wiffi Smith. She reached the semi-finals of Ladies' British Open Amateur Championship, losing to Mary Patton Janssen. In August 1956, she won the inaugural Scandinavian championship in Denmark. In 1957 she won the Portuguese championship.

Bonallack reached the semi-final of the Ladies' British Open Amateur Championship for a second time in 1958, losing to Jessie Valentine. Later she twice reached the final of the event, losing narrowly to Marley Spearman in 1962 and then to Carol Semple in 1974. She reached the final of the English Women's Amateur Championship four times in six years from 1958 to 1963. She won twice, beating Bridget Jackson in the final in 1958 and Liz Chadwick in 1963. She lost in the 1960 final to Margaret Nichol and to Jean Roberts in 1962. She reached the final again in 1974, losing to Mary Everard. Bonallack had considerable success in the Astor Prince's Trophy, an early 72-hole stroke play event played at Prince's in the 1960s. She won the event in 1962 and 1968 and was runner-up four times. She was runner-up behind Ann Irvin in the 1970 Hovis International at Liphook and was a runner-up in the 1976 Newmark International at Woodhall Spa, behind Jenny Lee-Smith.

Playing with Janette Robertson, Bonallack was a joint winner of the inaugural Kayser Bondor Foursomes in 1958. She was runner-up in the event in 1960, playing with Elizabeth Price. She was runner-up in the 1966 Avia Foursomes, playing with her sister Shirley Ward, an event she later won in 1976 playing with her sister-in-law Sally Barber. Playing with her husband Michael Bonallack she won the 1958 Worplesdon Mixed Foursomes.

Bonallack played in six successive Curtis Cup matches from 1956 to 1966. After winning in 1956 the Great Britain and Ireland team tied the 1958 match in America, retaining the cup. Bonallack won her foursomes match, playing with Elizabeth Price, and halved her match in the singles against Barbara McIntire. The United States regained the cup in 1960 with Bonallack winning her foursomes match, playing again with Elizabeth Price, but losing in the singles. The British lost heavily in the 1962 match in Colorado, winning just one of the nine 36-hole matches. Bonallack lost both her matches. The 1964 Curtis Cup at Royal Porthcawl was the first to have 18-hole matches. She played with Marley Spearman in both sets of the foursomes matches, winning both times. However she lost both her singles matches. The contest was much closer than that in 1962 with the teams level at the start of the final round of singles matches. Her final Curtis Cup appearance was in 1966 in Hot Springs, Virginia. She lost her first three matches but beat Jean Ashley in the final round of singles matches. In the six contests, she won six matches, lost eight and halved one.

In 2015, Bonallack became the first woman to take part in a match as a member of The Royal and Ancient Golf Club of St Andrews; specifically, she was the first woman to play in the club's annual match against the Links Trust.

== Personal life and death ==
In February 1958, Bonallack married Michael Bonallack, also a leading amateur golfer. They had four children born between 1959 and 1967. Michael Bonallack was knighted in the 1998 Birthday Honours and she became Lady Bonallack.

Angela Bonallack died on 1 July 2022, at the age of 85.

== Team appearances ==
- Curtis Cup (representing Great Britain & Ireland): 1956 (winners), 1958 (tied), 1960, 1962, 1964, 1966
- Vagliano Trophy (representing Great Britain & Ireland): 1957 (winners), 1959 (winners), 1961 (winners), 1963 (winners)
- Women's Home Internationals (representing England): 1956, 1957, 1958 (winners), 1959 (winners), 1961, 1962, 1963 (winners), 1964 (winners), 1966 (winners), 1972 (winners)
- England–Scotland girls match (representing England): 1953 (winners), 1954 (winners), 1955 (winners)
