= 1958 Curtis Cup =

Golf competition in Newton, Massachusetts

Coordinates: 42.337°N 71.234°W

10th Curtis Cup Match
- Dates: August 8–9, 1958
- Venue: Brae Burn Country Club
- Location: Newton, Massachusetts
- Organized by: USGA and The R&A
- Captains: Virginia Dennehy (USA); Daisy Ferguson (British Isles)
(United States)	4 1/2	4 1/2	(United Kingdom) (Republic of Ireland)
- British Isles retains the Curtis Cup

The 10th Curtis Cup Match was played on August 8 and 9, 1958 at Brae Burn Country Club in Newton, Massachusetts. The Americans were the "slight favourites" though the British team arrived optimistic. They were the defending champions and possessed an experienced squad against the American team, made up primarily by college students and recent grads. The British indeed opened the tournament well, winning two of the three opening foursome matches. During the final singles matches, however, a heatwave encompassing Boston region had effects on the British team; there seemed "little hope for success" after the morning round. However, a rally led by Angela Bonallack and Frances Smith reversed fortunes and British team managed to tie, thereby retaining the cup as defending champions. Smith, a grieving widow with a newborn child, returned to England a "heroine" by virtue of earning the winning point.

== Format ==
The contest was played over two days, with three foursomes on the first day and six singles matches on the second day, a total of 9 points. Matches were over 36 holes.

Each of the 9 matches was worth one point in the larger team competition. If a match was all square after the 36th hole extra holes were not played. Rather, each side earned 1/2 a point toward their team total. The team that accumulated at least 5 points won the competition. In the case of a tie, the team that won the previous tournament retained the cup, in this case the British and Irish team.

== Teams ==
United States
Name	Notes
Virginia Dennehy	non-playing captain
Meriam Bailey
JoAnne Gunderson
Ann Casey Johnstone
Barbara McIntire
Anne Richardson
Polly Riley	played in 1948, 1950, 1952, 1954 and 1956
Barbara Romack	played in 1954 and 1956
Anne Quast

Meriam Bailey and Anne Richardson did not play in any matches.

& British Isles
Name	Notes
(Northern Ireland) Daisy Ferguson	playing captain
(England) Angela Bonallack	played in 1956
(England) Bridget Jackson
(England) Elizabeth Price	played in 1950, 1952, 1954 and 1956
(Scotland) Janette Robertson	played in 1954 and 1956
(England) Frances Smith	played in 1950, 1952, 1954 and 1956
(Scotland) Dorothea Sommerville
(Scotland) Jessie Valentine	played in 1936, 1938, 1950, 1952, 1954 and 1956

Dorothea Sommerville did not play in any matches.

== Tournament summary ==
In January, the Ladies' Golf Union international asked 11 British and Irish women if they were available to be selected for the upcoming Curtis Cup team. Ten of the 11 that they asked affirmed they were interested; only one golfer, Jeanne Bisgood, declined the opportunity. Pat Ward-Thomas, writing for The Guardian, noted that Angela Bonallack and Janette Robertson "would seem to be certain choices." However, he was suspicious about selecting Philomena Garvey for the team. He noted that she had a poor Curtis Cup record and that she "rarely has shown the resolution and character expected of a player of her class." He also suggested that the committee should pick Frances Smith as well as Elizabeth Price as they were indispensable for the British and Irish team when they won the 1956 Curtis Cup. In May, the Ladies' Golf Union announced their first four selections. Bonallack and Robertson were indeed selected. Price was also one of the first four picks. Garvey was among the first four selected too. Smith, however, was not immediately chosen. Smith herself was not expecting to be selected for the team. She was tending a newborn child, had not played much competitive golf recently, and was grieving the loss of her husband, a pilot killed in a plane crash months earlier. In June, however, it was announced that Smith was among the final three selections along with Jessie Valentine and Dorothea Sommerville. Bridget Jackson was declared a reserve. Days after the final picks, however, Philomena Garvey announced her resignation. She was distraught that only the flag of the United Kingdom, the Union Jack, would be sewn onto their jackets. The flag of her country, The Republic of Ireland, would not be visible. The Irish Ladies Golf Union supported her decision. Englishwoman Bridget Jackson, the reserve, replaced her.

In July, the Americans selected their team. Curtis Cup veterans Polly Riley, from Texas, and Californian Barbara Romack, were among the top picks. However, most of the selections skewed young. 19-year-old JoAnne Gunderson, a sophomore at Arizona State University, was the youngest player ever to participate for the team. In addition, Anne Quast, also playing in her first Curtis Cup, was just a junior at Stanford University. Barbara McIntire, a 23-year-old Floridian, was another rookie member. 37-year-old Ann Casey Johnstone was the only middle-aged novice on the team.

The tournament was held at Brae Burn Country Club in Newton, Massachusetts, a suburb of Boston, in early August. On the first day of the month, the British team arrived in Boston. They were intending to win the tournament for the first time in the United States. The Associated Press noted that "this could be the year" for the British. Five of their seven players played on the 1956 winning team; the United States only had two players from the previous squad. In addition, this was the first time the British and Irish team traveled by plane shortening the transatlantic voyage by a week and providing more time for practice. However, the Americans were considered "slight favourites" to win the tournament. The Americans were considered, in general, the stronger team. In addition, they "had the advantage of playing in their home country." Lastly, the temperatures in the Boston area were hotter than they were for a typical summer and the British team was unaccustomed to such intense conditions. Early in the practice week, it was noted by an American journalist that "the British squad... had been visibility affected by a blistering sun in temperatures which have into the 90s." Meanwhile, the American team, many from warm weather states, were acclimated to such conditions.

The first round was played in the foursomes, or "alternate play," format. The "oppressive, humid conditions" persisted. The "top match" fared English golfers Angela Bonallack and Elizabeth Price against Americans Barbara Romack and Polly Riley. It was a "seesaw struggle" where neither pair was able to break away. The British took a 2 up lead after the opening nine and maintained it after 18 holes. On the 4th hole of the afternoon round, however, Bonallack "fainted" and needed the assistance of a doctor. She was able to recover but this "jolted" the British pair; and they lost three consecutive holes to lose the lead. Around the turn, however, the British won a number of holes and it was all square entering the 15th. There the big "break-through" occurred. Riley hit an "over-bold chip shot" and the American pair recorded a bogey while the British made a routine par to take the lead for good. In the second match British pair Janette Robertson and Frances Smith took a 5 up lead after the morning round. They "never looked in danger of defeat" against JoAnne Gunderson and Anne Quast, ultimately winning 3 & 2. The final match presented Americans Barbara McIntire and Ann Casey Johnstone against Jessie Valentine and Bridget Jackson. The Americans opened with a "comedy of errors" on the first hole with a number of terrible shots; they ultimately recorded a "X," forfeiting the hole. But for the remainder of the match the "consistent" Americans absolutely dominated. At the turn of the morning round, they had taken the lead. In the middle of the match they began exhibiting play, in the words of The Daily Telegraph, that was "distinctly inhuman." McIntire and Johnstone ultimately recorded eight birdies to win 6 & 5. This was the Americans' lone point; they were behind 2–1 after the first round. The final day's singles matches were announced later in the evening. Frances Smith would be facing Polly Riley in the final match. The Daily Telegraph's Enid Wilson surmised, "Perhaps the match between Mrs. Smith and Miss Riley will be the deciding factor, as it was two years ago."

During the singles matches, the British and Irish team secured the cup, "the chief heroine" being Englishwoman Frances Smith. However, it looked like a "black day" for their team at the onset. According to The Daily Telegraph the "heat and high humidity of the previous day" seemed to have residual effects. The British team's play "was distinctly scrappy over the first nine holes." At lunch, after the first 18 holes, the Americans led in four of the six matches and were tied in another. Scotswoman Janette Robertson was the only Briton to lead. There seemed "little hope for success." After lunch, however, the British team played better. Star player Angela Bonallack was 4 down with only eight holes remaining but rallied, winning the four holes on the back nine to halve her match with Barbara McIntire. Jessie Valentine "lagged" behind most of the day behind JoAnne Gunderson but, like Bonallack, rallied to tie her on the back nine. However, she lost the final two holes to lose 2 up. Robertson, the only British leader at the halfway point, "finished strongly" to defeat Ann Casey Johnstone 3 & 2. However, Elizabeth Price and Bridget Jackson were unable to overcome significant halfway deficits and both ultimately lost on the 34th hole. The tournament came down to the final match, between Polly Riley and Frances Smith, as it had at the 1956 Curtis Cup. Like her compatriots, Smith struggled in the morning; however, she managed to tie by lunch and ultimately led 1 up going into the final hole. On the 36th hole, Smith "drove straight down the fairway" and made the green in regulation. Riley played the hole poorly and had yet to reach the green in three shots. Riley "made a wonderful bid on a chip of at least 40 feet" for par but just missed. Smith finished with a routine par to defeat her 2 up. With her win, the teams tied 4 1/2 to 4 1/2. In an event of a tie, the most recent champion retained the cup; in this case, it was the British, and Smith's win proved decisive.

The British team's victory was referred to as a "historic performance" by The Observer. It was the first time the British and Irish Curtis Cup team had secured the cup while playing in the United States. In fact, it was the "first British team, Walker, Ryder or Curtis Cup to come away from the United States undefeated." Pat Ward-Thomas of The Guardian singled out Smith for her extraordinary play. He wrote "in all the long story of international contests there has never been a greater competitor, man or woman," given her nearly undefeated record. It was also deemed "a story-book finish" as Smith was the sentimental favorite after the recent death of her husband. Smith returned home a "heroine." The Liverpool Daily Post greeted her at the airport. Her image and a story about her were featured on the front page of the newspaper. Smith's immediate plans were to tend to her daughter and then prepare for the English Women's Amateur Championship, held later in the summer.

== Friday's foursomes matches ==
&	Results
Bonallack/Price	(United Kingdom) (Republic of Ireland) 2 & 1	Romack/Riley
Robertson/Smith	(United Kingdom) (Republic of Ireland) 3 & 2	Gunderson/Quast
Jackson/Valentine	(United States) 6 & 5	McIntyre/Johnstone
2	Session	1
2	Overall	1

18-hole scores: Bonallack/Price 2 up, Robertson/Smith 5 up, McIntyre/Johnstone 5 up

== Saturday's singles matches ==
&	Results
Jessie Valentine	(United States) 2 up	JoAnne Gunderson
Angela Bonallack	halved	Barbara McIntire
Elizabeth Price	(United States) 4 & 2	Anne Quast
Janette Robertson	(United Kingdom) (Republic of Ireland) 3 & 2	Ann Casey Johnstone
Bridget Jackson	(United States) 4 & 2	Barbara Romack
Frances Smith	(United Kingdom) (Republic of Ireland) 2 up	Polly Riley
2 1/2	Session	3 1/2
4 1/2	Overall	4 1/2

18-hole scores: Gunderson 2 up, McIntire 1 up, Quast 3 up, Robertson 5 up, Romack 2 up, Smith/Riley all square
