= Barbara Romack =

American golfer

Personal information
- Full name: Barbara Gaile Romack
- Nationality: United States
- Born: November 16, 1932 Sacramento, California, U.S.
- Died: October 15, 2016 (aged 83) The Villages, Florida, U.S.
- Height: 5 ft 4 in (1.63 m)

Career
- Sport: Golf
- Turned professional: 1958
- Former tour: LPGA Tour (1958–1977)
- Professional wins: 2

Number of wins by tour
- LPGA Tour: 1
- Other: 1

Best results in LPGA major championships
- Western Open: 2nd: 1960
- Titleholders C'ship: 3rd: 1962
- Women's PGA C'ship: T6: 1961
- U.S. Women's Open: T7: 1961

Barbara Gaile Romack (November 16, 1932 – October 15, 2016) was an American professional golfer.

== Early life and amateur career ==
In 1932, Romack was born in Sacramento, California.

In 1952, Romack won the North and South Women's Amateur at Pinehurst, the 1953 Canadian Women's Amateur, and then, in 1954, she defeated Mickey Wright in the finals to win the U.S. Women's Amateur. Her playing brought an invitation to the White House and President Dwight Eisenhower became a great friend.

In 1955, Romack finished second to Jessie Valentine in the British Ladies Amateur played at the Royal Portrush Golf Club in Northern Ireland. Her golfing performances earned her the cover of Sports Illustrated on April 16, 1956.

Romack was the runner-up to Anne Quast in the 1958 U.S. Women's Amateur. She was also a member of the U.S. Curtis Cup team in 1954, 1956, and 1958.

== Professional career ==
In 1958, Romack joined the LPGA Tour. Her only official tour win was the 1963 Rock City Ladies Open.

She won on the senior tour and remained involved with the game of golf throughout her life. She worked for the USGA as a volunteer. At one time she served as vice-president of the LPGA.

== Personal life ==
In May 1957, she married Edward Wayne "Bud" Porter, an associate golf professional at course in her native Sacramento, California.

On February 21, 1968, Romack was on a Delta Air Lines flight when it was hijacked by Lawrence Rhodes. After three hours, Romack and the rest of the passengers were released.

In 2016, Romack died, aged 83.

== Amateur wins ==
- 1952 North and South Women's Amateur, California State Women's Amateur
- 1953 Canadian Women's Amateur
- 1954 U.S. Women's Amateur, California State Women's Amateur
- 1956 California State Women's Amateur
- 1958 California State Women's Amateur
- South Atlantic Amateur (three times)

== Professional wins ==
=== LPGA Tour wins (1) ===
No.	Date	Tournament	Winning score	Margin of victory	Runner-up
1	Jun 9, 1963	Rock City Ladies Open	−1 (72-71-69=212)	Playoff	(United States) Shirley Englehorn

LPGA Tour playoff record (1–0)

No.	Year	Tournament	Opponent	Result
1	1963	Rock City Ladies Open	(United States) Shirley Englehorn	Won with par on third extra hole

=== Other wins ===
- 1960 Leesburg Pro-Am

== Team appearances ==
Amateur

- Curtis Cup (representing the United States): 1954 (winners), 1956, 1958 (tie)
