= Vagliano Trophy =

Women's amateur golf tournament

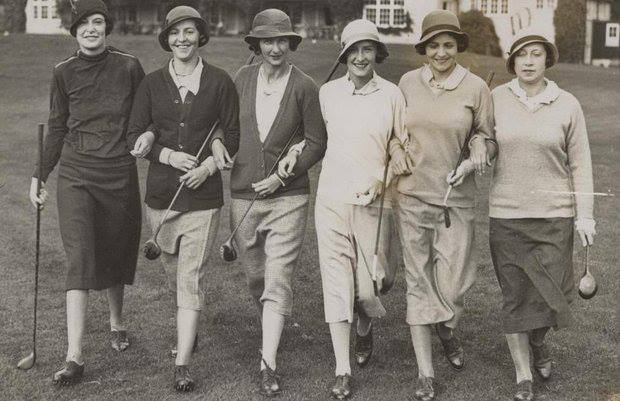
Vagliano Trophy 1931, French team

The Vagliano Trophy is a biennial women's amateur golf tournament. It is co-organised by The R&A and the European Golf Association and is contested by teams representing "Great Britain and Ireland" and the "Continent of Europe". It is played in odd-numbered years; the Curtis Cup being played in even-numbered years.

The event started in 1931 as a match between Great Britain and France. It was played annually from 1931 to 1939 and from 1947 to 1949, before becoming a biennial event from 1949 to 1957. Britain won 15 of the 16 matches with the 1934 match being tied. From 1949 to 1957 Great Britain had also played a biennial match against Belgium. In 1959 the two matches were replaced by one with Britain playing a team representing the Continent of Europe, the Vagliano Trophy being used for the new event.

The trophy was given by André Vagliano, a French golfer and official in the French Golf Federation and also father of Lally Segard, who played in this match on 13 occasions. The Ladies Golf Union initially declined to accept the trophy but changed their mind in late 1932, accepting the Curtis Cup at the same time.

== Format ==
The competition involves various match play matches between players selected from the two teams of 8, either singles and foursomes. The winner of each match scores a point for their team, with half a point each for any match that is tied after 18 holes. If the entire match is tied, the previously winning team retains the Trophy.

A foursomes match is a competition between two teams of two golfers. The golfers on the same team take alternate shots throughout the match, with the same ball. Each hole is won by the team that completes the hole in the fewest shots. A fourball match is a competition between two teams of two golfers. All four golfers play their own ball throughout the round. Each hole is won by the team whose individual golfer had the lowest score. A singles match is a standard match play competition between two golfers.

The contest is played over two days, with four foursomes and eight singles matches on each day, a total of 24 points. Before 1975 there were five foursomes and ten singles matches each day. In 1959 and 1961 there were five 36-hole foursomes on the first day and ten 36-hole singles on the second. All matches after 1961 have been over 18 holes.

== Results ==
Since the Continent of Europe replaced France in 1959.

Year	Venue	Winning team	Score		Losing team	Ref
2025	Koninklijke Haagsche Golf & Country Club (Wassenaar, Netherlands)	(United Kingdom) Great Britain & (Republic of Ireland) Ireland	12½	11½	Continent of Europe	
2023	Royal Dornoch Golf Club (Dornoch, Scotland)	Continent of Europe	13½	10½	(United Kingdom) Great Britain & (Republic of Ireland) Ireland	
2019	Royal St George's Golf Club (Sandwich, England)	Continent of Europe	14½	9½	(United Kingdom) Great Britain & (Republic of Ireland) Ireland	
2017	Circolo Golf Bogogno (Bogogno, Italy)	Continent of Europe	15	9	(United Kingdom) Great Britain & (Republic of Ireland) Ireland	
2015	Malone Golf Club (Dunmurry, Northern Ireland)	Continent of Europe	12½	11½	(United Kingdom) Great Britain & (Republic of Ireland) Ireland	
2013	Golf de Chantilly (Chantilly, Oise, France)	Continent of Europe	16½	7½	(United Kingdom) Great Britain & (Republic of Ireland) Ireland	
2011	Royal Porthcawl Golf Club (Porthcawl, Wales)	Continent of Europe	15½	8½	(United Kingdom) Great Britain & (Republic of Ireland) Ireland	
2009	Hamburger Golf Club (Hamburg, Germany)	Continent of Europe	13	11	(United Kingdom) Great Britain & (Republic of Ireland) Ireland	
2007	Fairmont St Andrews (St Andrews, Scotland)	Continent of Europe	15	9	(United Kingdom) Great Britain & (Republic of Ireland) Ireland	
2005	Golf de Chantilly (Chantilly, Oise, France)	(United Kingdom) Great Britain & (Republic of Ireland) Ireland	13	11	Continent of Europe	
2003	County Louth Golf Club (Baltray, Ireland)	(United Kingdom) Great Britain & (Republic of Ireland) Ireland	12½	11½	Continent of Europe	
2001	Circolo Golf Venezia (Venice Lido, Venice, Italy)	Continent of Europe	13	11	(United Kingdom) Great Britain & (Republic of Ireland) Ireland	
1999	North Berwick Golf Club (North Berwick, Scotland)	Continent of Europe	13	11	(United Kingdom) Great Britain & (Republic of Ireland) Ireland	
1997	Halmstad GK (Halmstad, Sweden)	Continent of Europe	14	10	(United Kingdom) Great Britain & (Republic of Ireland) Ireland	
1995	Ganton Golf Club (Ganton, Yorkshire, England)	Continent of Europe	14	10	(United Kingdom) Great Britain & (Republic of Ireland) Ireland	
1993	Golf de Morfontaine (Morfontaine, France)	(United Kingdom) Great Britain & (Republic of Ireland) Ireland	13½	10½	Continent of Europe	
1991	Nairn Golf Club (Nairn, Scotland)	(United Kingdom) Great Britain & (Republic of Ireland) Ireland	13½	10½	Continent of Europe	
1989	Circolo Golf Venezia (Venice Lido, Venice, Italy)	(United Kingdom) Great Britain & (Republic of Ireland) Ireland	14½	9½	Continent of Europe	
1987	Berkshire Golf Club (Ascot, Berkshire, England)	(United Kingdom) Great Britain & (Republic of Ireland) Ireland	15	9	Continent of Europe	
1985	Hamburger Golf Club (Hamburg, Germany)	(United Kingdom) Great Britain & (Republic of Ireland) Ireland	14	10	Continent of Europe	
1983	Woodhall Spa Golf Club (Woodhall Spa, England)	(United Kingdom) Great Britain & (Republic of Ireland) Ireland	14	10	Continent of Europe	
1981	Real Club de la Puerta de Hierro (Madrid, Spain)	Continent of Europe	14	10	(United Kingdom) Great Britain & (Republic of Ireland) Ireland	
1979	Royal Porthcawl Golf Club (Porthcawl, Wales)	(United Kingdom) Great Britain & (Republic of Ireland) Ireland	12	12	Continent of Europe	
1977	Ljunghusen Golf Club (Ljunghusen, Sweden)	(United Kingdom) Great Britain & (Republic of Ireland) Ireland	15½	8½	Continent of Europe	
1975	Muirfield (Gullane, Scotland)	(United Kingdom) Great Britain & (Republic of Ireland) Ireland	13½	10½	Continent of Europe	
1973	Eindhovensche Golf (Valkenswaard, Netherlands)	(United Kingdom) Great Britain & (Republic of Ireland) Ireland	20	10	Continent of Europe	
1971	Worplesdon Golf Club (Brookwood, Surrey, England)	(United Kingdom) Great Britain & (Republic of Ireland) Ireland	17½	12½	Continent of Europe	
1969	Golf de Chantilly (Chantilly, Oise, France)	Continent of Europe	16	14	(United Kingdom) Great Britain & (Republic of Ireland) Ireland	
1967	Royal Lytham & St Annes Golf Club (Lytham St Annes, England)	Continent of Europe	15½	14½	(United Kingdom) Great Britain & (Republic of Ireland) Ireland	
1965	GLC Köln (Bergisch Gladbach, Germany)	Continent of Europe	17	13	(United Kingdom) Great Britain & (Republic of Ireland) Ireland	
1963	Muirfield (Gullane, Scotland)	(United Kingdom) Great Britain & (Republic of Ireland) Ireland	20	10	Continent of Europe	
1961	Circolo Golf Villa D'Este (Montorfano, Como, Italy)	(United Kingdom) Great Britain & (Republic of Ireland) Ireland	8	7	Continent of Europe	
1959	Wentworth Golf Club (Wentworth, Surrey, England)	(United Kingdom) Great Britain & (Republic of Ireland) Ireland	12	3	Continent of Europe	

Of the 31 contests from 1959 to 2019, Great Britain and Ireland have won 15, the Continent of Europe have won 15 matches with 1 match tied (1979).

The results of matches against France between 1931 and 1957 are given below. Matches consisted of three foursomes matches and six singles matches, played on a single day.

Year	Venue	Winning team	Score		Losing team	Ref
1957	Golf de Morfontaine (Morfontaine, France)	(United Kingdom) Great Britain & (Republic of Ireland) Ireland	5½	3½	France	
1955	Gullane Golf Club (Gullane, Scotland)	(United Kingdom) Great Britain & (Republic of Ireland) Ireland	7	2	France	
1953	Golf de Chantilly (Chantilly, Oise, France)	(United Kingdom) Great Britain & (Republic of Ireland) Ireland	5½	3½	France	
1951	St George's Hill Golf Club (Weybridge, England)	(United Kingdom) Great Britain & (Republic of Ireland) Ireland	8	1	France	
1949	Golf de Morfontaine (Morfontaine, France)	(United Kingdom) Great Britain & (Republic of Ireland) Ireland	8½	½	France	
1948	Royal Mid-Surrey Golf Club (Richmond, London, England)	(United Kingdom) Great Britain & (Republic of Ireland) Ireland	6½	2½	France	
1947	Golf de Saint-Cloud (Saint-Cloud, France)	(United Kingdom) Great Britain & (Republic of Ireland) Ireland	6½	2½	France	
1939	Bramshot Golf Club (Farnborough, Hampshire, England)	(United Kingdom) Great Britain & (Republic of Ireland) Ireland	6½	2½	France	
1938	Golf de Morfontaine (Morfontaine, France)	(United Kingdom) Great Britain & (Republic of Ireland) Ireland	7	2	France	
1937	West Sussex Golf Club (Pulborough, England)	(United Kingdom) Great Britain & (Republic of Ireland) Ireland	6½	2½	France	
1936	Golf de Saint-Cloud (Saint-Cloud, France)	(United Kingdom) Great Britain & (Republic of Ireland) Ireland	6	3	France	
1935	Worplesdon Golf Club (Brookwood, Surrey, England)	(United Kingdom) Great Britain & (Republic of Ireland) Ireland	5	4	France	
1934	Golf de Chantilly (Chantilly, Oise, France)	(United Kingdom) Great Britain & (Republic of Ireland) Ireland	4½	4½	France	
1933	St George's Hill Golf Club (Weybridge, England)	(United Kingdom) Great Britain & (Republic of Ireland) Ireland	7	2	France	
1932	Golf de Saint-Germain (Saint-Germain-en-Laye, France)	(United Kingdom) Great Britain & (Republic of Ireland) Ireland	7	2	France	
1931	Oxhey Golf Club (Watford, England)	(United Kingdom) Great Britain & (Republic of Ireland) Ireland	8½	½	France	

Britain won 15 of the 16 matches with the 1934 match being tied.

=== Great Britain & Ireland v Belgium ===
From 1949 to 1957 Great Britain & Ireland also played a match against Belgium. The match was played just before or just after the match against France, Great Britain & Ireland using the same squad for both matches, Great Britain & Ireland won all five matches by large margins. In 1950 Margaret Wallace-Williamson presented a trophy for the event.

Year	Venue	Winning team	Score		Losing team	Ref
1957	Royal Zoute Golf Club (Knokke-Heist, Belgium)	(United Kingdom) Great Britain & (Republic of Ireland) Ireland	8	1	Belgium	
1955	Gullane Golf Club (Gullane, Scotland)	(United Kingdom) Great Britain & (Republic of Ireland) Ireland	7½	1½	Belgium	
1953	Royal Antwerp Golf Club (Kapellen, Belgium)	(United Kingdom) Great Britain & (Republic of Ireland) Ireland	9	0	Belgium	
1951	Wentworth Golf Club (Virginia Water, England)	(United Kingdom) Great Britain & (Republic of Ireland) Ireland	8	1	Belgium	
1949	Waterloo Golf Club (Lasne, Belgium)	(United Kingdom) Great Britain & (Republic of Ireland) Ireland	8	1	Belgium	

== Future sites ==
- 2023 - Royal Dornoch

== Teams ==
=== Great Britain & Ireland ===
- 1931 Elsie Corlett, Diana Fishwick, Marjorie Ross Garon, Molly Gourlay, Jean McCulloch, Wanda Morgan, Charlotte Watson, Joyce Wethered
- 1932 Diana Fishwick, Marjorie Ross Garon, Molly Gourlay, Clem Montgomery, Wanda Morgan, Doris Park, Eithne Pentony, Charlotte Watson
- 1933 Diana Fishwick, Kathleen Garnham, Molly Gourlay, Helen Holm, Clem Montgomery, Wanda Morgan, Doris Park, Diana Plumpton
- 1934 Pam Barton, Millicent Couper, Diana Fishwick, Helen Holm, Mary Jestyn Jeffreys, Wanda Morgan, Dorothy Pearson, Phyllis Wade
- 1935 Jessie Anderson, Nan Baird, Mervyn Barton, Helen Holm, Wanda Morgan, Phyllis Wade, Pat Walker
- 1936 Jessie Anderson, Pam Barton, Elsie Corlett, Kathleen Garnham, Marjorie Ross Garon, Helen Holm, Bridget Newell, Phyllis Wade
- 1937 Pam Barton, Elsie Corlett, Kathleen Garnham, Marjorie Ross Garon, Helen Holm, Clem Montgomery, Bridget Newell, Phyllis Wade
- 1938 Jessie Anderson, Pam Barton, Elsie Corlett, Molly Gourlay, Helen Holm, Doris Park, Pat Walker
- 1939 Jessie Anderson, Pam Barton, Elsie Corlett, Molly Gourlay, Edith Rhodes, Pat Walker, Joy Winn, Phyllis Wylie
- 1947 Katharine Cairns, Jean Donald, Jacqueline Gordon, Helen Holm, Maureen Ruttle, Frances Stephens, Jessie Valentine, Phyllis Wylie
- 1948 Zara Bolton, Jean Donald, Jacqueline Gordon, Maureen Garrett, Helen Holm, Moira Paterson, Frances Stephens, Mollie Wallis
- 1949 Jeanne Bisgood, Jean Donald, Vyvian Falconer, Philomena Garvey, Helen Holm, Moira Paterson, Frances Stephens, Jessie Valentine
- 1951 Jeanne Bisgood, Katharine Cairns, Jean Donald, Philomena Garvey, Joan Gee, Moira Paterson, Jessie Valentine
- 1953 Katharine Cairns, Jean Donald, Dorothy Forster, Philomena Garvey, Jane Machin, Elizabeth Price, Frances Stephens
- 1955 Philomena Garvey, Ann Howard, Marjorie Peel, Elizabeth Price, Betty Singleton, Frances Smith, Jane Sugden, Jessie Valentine
- 1957 Philomena Garvey, Ann Howard, Bridget Jackson, Elizabeth Price, Janette Robertson, Marigold Speir, Angela Ward
- 1959: Angela Bonallack, Philomena Garvey, Bridget Jackson, Belle McCorkindale, Margaret Nichol, Ruth Porter, Elizabeth Price, Janette Robertson, Tessa Ross Steen, Frances Smith, Marley Spearman, Anne Whittaker
- 1961: Angela Bonallack, Sally Bonallack, Julia Greenhalgh, Joan Hastings, Ann Irvin, Ainslie Lurie, Margaret Nichol, Ruth Porter, Diane Robb, Marley Spearman, Sheila Vaughan, Janette Wright
- 1963: Susan Armitage, Sally Barber, Angela Bonallack, Liz Chadwick, Philomena Garvey, Ann Irvin, Bridget Jackson, Joan Lawrence, Jean Roberts, Belle Robertson, Dorothea Sommerville, Janette Wright
- 1965: Susan Armitage, Ita Burke, Gillian Cheetham, Marjory Fowler, Julia Greenhalgh, Ann Irvin, Bridget Jackson, Joan Lawrence, Ruth Porter, Marley Spearman, Jill Thornhill, Sheila Vaughan
- 1967: Gwen Brandom, Liz Chadwick, Mary Everard, Sarah German, Ann Irvin, Bridget Jackson, Annette Laing, Dinah Oxley, Margaret Pickard, Vivien Saunders, Joan Rennie, Pam Tredinnick
- 1969: Heather Anderson, Sally Barber, Elaine Bradshaw, Barbara Dixon, Mary Everard, Ann Irvin, Mary McKenna, Dinah Oxley, Kathryn Phillips, Belle Robertson, Margaret Wenyon
- 1971: Elaine Bradshaw, Audrey Briggs, Linda Denison-Pender, Mary Everard, Beverly Huke, Ann Irvin, Mary McKenna, Dinah Oxley, Kathryn Phillips, Belle Robertson, Michelle Walker
- 1973: Audrey Briggs, Linda Denison-Pender, Mary Everard, Carol Le Feuvre, Ann Irvin, Mary McKenna, Maisey Mooney, Sandra Needham, Tegwen Perkins, Carole Redford, Thomasina Walker
- 1975: Suzanne Cadden, Julia Greenhalgh, Beverly Huke, Ann Irvin, Mary McKenna, Sandra Needham, Tegwen Perkins, Anne Stant, Maureen Walker
- 1977: Mary Gorry, Julia Greenhalgh, Vanessa Marvin, Mary McKenna, Catherine Panton, Tegwen Perkins, Joan Smith, Muriel Thomson, Angela Uzielli
- 1979: Sandra Cohen, Sue Hedges, Mary McKenna, Maureen Madill, Janet Melville, Claire Nesbitt, Tegwen Perkins, Vicki Rawlings, Gillian Stewart
- 1981: Wilma Aitken, Jane Connachan, Claire Hourihane, Mary McKenna, Maureen Madill, Mandy Rawlings, Belle Robertson, Gillian Stewart, Pamela Wright
- 1983: Wilma Aitken, Jane Connachan, Kitrina Douglas, Claire Hourihane, Beverley New, Gillian Stewart, Vicki Thomas, Jill Thornhill, Claire Waite
- 1985: Linda Bayman, Lillian Behan, Maureen Garner, Claire Hourihane, Trish Johnson, Mary McKenna, Belle Robertson, Vicki Thomas, Jill Thornhill
- 1987: Fiona Anderson, Linda Bayman, Janet Collingham, Karen Davies, Claire Hourihane, Mary McKenna, Susan Shapcott, Vicki Thomas, Jill Thornhill
- 1989: Helen Dobson, Lora Fairclough, Elaine Farquharson, Julie Hall, Claire Hourihane, Shirley Huggan, Kathryn Imrie, Catriona Lambert, Vicki Thomas
- 1991: Nicola Buxton, Fiona Edmond, Elaine Farquharson, Caroline Hall, Julie Hall, Claire Hourihane, Catriona Lambert, Joanne Morley, Vicki Thomas
- 1993: Nicola Buxton, Julie Hall, Joanne Hockley, Catriona Lambert, Mhairi McKay, Janice Moodie, Joanne Morley, Kirsty Speak, Lisa Walton
- 1995: Emma Duggleby, Julie Hall, Hazel Kavenagh, Sandy Lambert, Mhairi McKay, Janice Moodie, Eileen Rose Power, Alison Rose, Lisa Walton
- 1997: Rebecca Hudson, Mhairi McKay, Janice Moodie, Becky Morgan, Eileen Rose Power, Elaine Ratcliffe, Alison Rose, Kim Rostron, Karen Stupples
- 1999: Kim Andrew, Fiona Brown, Alison Coffey, Anne Laing, Laura Moffat, Hilary Monaghan, Becky Morgan, Lesley Nicholson, Suzanne O'Brien
- 2001: Kim Andrew, Becky Brewerton, Fiona Brown, Alison Coffey, Emma Duggleby, Kirsty Fisher, Rebecca Hudson, Fame More, Kerry Smith
- 2003: Becky Brewerton, Emma Duggleby, Lynn Kenny, Anne Laing, Vikki Laing, Tricia Mangan, Danielle Masters, Fame More, Clare Queen
- 2005: Claire Coughlan, Martina Gillen, Felicity Johnson, Anne Laing, Heather MacRae, Tricia Mangan, Clare Queen, Kerry Smith, Sophie Walker
- 2007: Rachel Bell, Liz Bennett, Krystle Caithness, Tara Delaney, Naomi Edwards, Sahra Hassan, Breanne Loucks, Melissa Reid, Kerry Smith
- 2009: Jodi Ewart, Rachel Jennings, Leona Maguire, Lisa Maguire, Danielle McVeigh, Pamela Pretswell, Rhian Wyn Thomas, Kylie Walker, Sally Watson
- 2011: Amy Boulden, Holly Clyburn, Louise Kenney, Kelsey Macdonald, Danielle McVeigh, Leona Maguire, Stephanie Meadow, Pamela Pretswell, Kelly Tidy
- 2013: Amy Boulden, Gabrielle Cowley, Hayley Davis, Georgia Hall, Becky Harries, Bronte Law, Stephanie Meadow, Alexandra Peters, Amber Ratcliffe
- 2015: Gemma Clews, Hayley Davis, Alice Hewson, Bronte Law, Meghan Maclaren, Leona Maguire, Olivia Mehaffey, Charlotte Thomas, Chloe Williams
- 2017: Gemma Clews, India Clyburn, Maria Dunne, Alice Hewson, Sophie Lamb, Leona Maguire, Olivia Mehaffey, Annabel Wilson
- 2019: Annabell Fuller, Alice Hewson, Lily May Humphreys, Hazel MacGarvie, Julie McCarthy, Shannon McWilliam, Emily Toy, Isobel Wardle
- 2023: Rosie Belsham, Beth Coulter, Hannah Darling, Aine Donegan, Charlotte Heath, Lorna McClymont, Caley McGinty, Lottie Woad
- 2025: Beth Coulter, Hannah Darling, Aine Donegan, Sophia Fullbrook, Isla McDonald-O'Brien, Nellie Ong, Patience Rhodes, Lottie Woad

=== Continent of Europe ===
- 1959: Arlette Engel-Jacquet, Annelies Eschauzier, Isa Goldschmid, Marietta Gütermann, Monika Möller, Martine Paul, Janine Prion, Lally Segard, Odile Semelaigne, Anne van Riemsdijk, Brigitte Varangot, Andrée Villers
- 1961: Vanda Rosa Bohus de Világos, Claudine Cros, Mercedes Etchart de Artiach, Arlette Engel-Jacquet, Martine Gajan, Isa Goldschmid, M Mahé, Lally Segard, Louise van der Berghe, Anne van Riemsdijk, Brigitte Varangot
- 1963: Claudine Cros, Arlette Engel-Jacquet, Annelies Eschauzier, Liv Forsell, Isa Goldschmid, Marietta Gütermann, Monika Möller, Lally Segard, Monica Steegmann, Louise van der Berghe, Brigitte Varangot
- 1965: Claudine Cros, Liv Forsell, Odile Garaialde, Isa Goldschmid, Marietta Gütermann, Catherine Lacoste, Monika Möller, Marion Petersen, Annie van Lanschot, Anne van Riemsdijk, Brigitte Varangot
- 1967: Martine Cochet, Liv Forsell, Odile Garaialde, Isa Goldschmid, Alice Janmaat, Catherine Lacoste, Florence Mourgue d'Algue, Marion Petersen, Marina Ragher, Corinne Reybroeck, Lally Segard
- 1969: Joyce de Witt Puyt, Liv Forsell, Odile Garaialde, Martine Giraud, Isa Goldschmid, Alice Janmaat, Catherine Lacoste, Marion Petersen, Marina Ragher, Corinne Reybroeck, Brigitte Varangot
- 1971: Joyce de Witt Puyt, Liv Forsell, Odile Garaialde, Emma García-Ogara, Isa Goldschmid, Alice Janmaat, Annie Mackeson-Sandbach, Christina Nordström, Marion Petersen, Corinne Reybroeck, Brigitte Varangot
- 1973: Federica Dassù, Odile Garaialde, Martine Giraud, Isa Goldschmid, Marietta Gütermann, Joyce Heyster, Alice Janmaat, Catherine Lacoste, Anne Marie Palli, Anne Robert, Anna Skanse
- 1975: Cristina Marsans, Barbara Böhm, Carole Charbonnier, Marie-Christine de Werra, Martine Giraud, Anne Marie Palli, Marina Ragher, Corinne Reybroeck, Liv Wollin
- 1977: Barbara Böhm, Marie-Christine de Werra, Hillewi Hagström, Nathalie Jeanson, Anne Marie Palli, Barbara Rindi, Anna Skanse, Pia Tolomei, Liv Wollin
- 1979: Elaine Berthet, Barbara Böhm, Marie-Laure de Lorenzi, Marta Figueras-Dotti, Hillewi Hagström, Alice Janmaat, Cécilia Mourgue d'Algue, Marina Ragher, Marion Tannhäuser
- 1981: Cristina Marsans, Elaine Berthet, Marina Buscaini, Federica Dassù, Marta Figueras-Dotti, Elena Larrazábal Corominas, Carmen Maestre de Pellon, Cécilia Mourgue d'Algue, Liv Wollin
- 1983: Elaine Berthet, Marina Buscaini, Hillewi Hagström, Viveka Hoff, Martina Koch, Regine Lautens, Liselotte Neumann, Astrid Peter, Macarena Tey
- 1985: Emanuela Braito, Marie-Laure de Lorenzi-Taya, E Girardi, Martina Koch, Regine Lautens, Cécilia Mourgue d'Algue, Maria Orueta, Anna Oxenstierna, Aline Van der Haegen
- 1987: Helene Andersson, Caroline Bourtayre, Stefania Croce, Sofia Grönberg, Regine Lautens, Sophie Louapre, Mari Carmen Navarro, Sonia Wunsch, Aline Van der Haegen
- 1989: Lourdes Barbeito, Delphine Bourson, Caroline Bourtayre, Isabella Calogero, Macarena Campomanes, Silvia Cavalleri, Annika Östberg, Caterina Quintarelli, Aline Van der Haegen
- 1991: Maria Bertilsköld, Delphine Bourson, Silvia Cavalleri, Tina Fischer, Åsa Gottmo, Mette Hageman, Valérie Michaud, Laura Navarro, Caterina Quintarelli
- 1993: Delphine Bourson, Silvia Cavalleri, Stéphanie Dallongeville, Maria Hjorth, Anna-Carin Jonasson, Estefania Knuth, Laura Navarro, Maria José Pons, Vibeke Stensrud,
- 1995: Sara Beautell, Silvia Cavalleri, Sofie Eriksson, Maria Hjorth, Kristel Mourgue d'Algue, Maria José Pons, Ana Sánchez, Vibeke Stensrud, Amandine Vincent
- 1997: Maïtena Alsuguren, Silvia Cavalleri, Marie Hedberg, Karine Icher, Ulrica Jidflo, Jessica Lindbergh, Marta Prieto, Ana Sánchez, Giulia Sergas
- 1999: Stéphanie Arricau, Martina Eberl, Tania Elósegui, Karine Icher, Marine Monnet, Miriam Nagl, Federica Piovano, Nicole Stillig, Marieke Zelsmann
- 2001: Martina Eberl, Tania Elósegui, Kristina Engström, Anna Gertsson, Claire Grignolo, Gwladys Nocera, Federica Piovano, Marta Prieto, Denise Simon
- 2003: Minea Blomqvist, Emma Cabrera-Bello, Tania Elósegui, Sophie Giquel, Bettina Hauert, Fanny Schaeffer, Dewi Claire Schreefel, Elisa Serramia, Lisa Holm Sørensen
- 2005: Emma Cabrera-Bello, Anne-Lise Caudal, María Hernández, Sheila Lee, Pernilla Lindberg, Belén Mozo, Katharina Schallenberg, Alexandra Vilatte, Adriana Zwanck
- 2007: Denise Becker, Emma Cabrera-Bello, Carlota Ciganda, Valentine Derrey, Sandra Gal, Pernilla Lindberg, Belén Mozo, Anna Nordqvist, Caroline Westrup
- 2009: Lucie André, Rosanna Crépiat, Laura Gonzalez Escallon, Pia Halbig, Caroline Hedwall, Caroline Masson, Marieke Nivard, Marion Ricordeau, Adriana Zwanck
- 2011: Alexandra Bonetti, Céline Boutier, Manon Gidali, Camilla Hedberg, Lara Katzy, Therese Koelbaek, Sophia Popov, Madelene Sagström, Marta Silva
- 2013: Céline Boutier, Nicole Broch Larsen, Natalia Escuriola, Quirine Eijkenboom, Noemí Jiménez Martín, Camilla Hedberg, Karolin Lampert, Emily Kristine Pedersen, Sophia Popov
- 2015: Céline Boutier, Olivia Cowan, Justine Dreher, Nuria Iturrioz, Noemí Jiménez Martín, Madelene Sagström, Luna Sobrón, Linnea Ström, Albane Valenzuela
- 2017: Virginia Elena Carta, Matilda Castren, Julia Engström, Morgane Métraux, Linnea Ström, Puk Lyng Thomsen, Albane Valenzuela, Dewi Weber
- 2019: Caterina Don, Linn Grant, Leonie Harm, Frida Kinhult, Alessia Nobilio, Pauline Roussin-Bouchard, Emma Spitz, Albane Valenzuela
- 2023: Helen Briem, Savannah De Bock, Chiara Horder, Cayetana Fernández, Ingrid Lindblad, Julia López, Meja Örtengren, Rocío Tejedo
- 2025: Sara Brentcheneff, Emma Bunch, Chiara Horder, Valentine Delon, Cayetana Fernández, Carolina López-Chacarra, Marie Eline Madsen, Paula Martín, Camille Min-Gaultier

== See also ==
- Junior Vagliano Trophy
