= Spalding Women's Open Stroke Play =

Stroke play golf tournament

Tournament information
- Location: England
- Established: 1954
- Format: Stroke play
- Final year: 1959

Final champion
- (England) Elizabeth Price

The Spalding Women's Open Stroke Play was a national women's 72-hole stroke play golf tournament played in England from 1954 to 1959. It was sometimes referred to as the unofficial stroke play championship. The 1954 event was won by Jean Donald, who had recently become a professional. The event was preceded by the Women's National Tournament which was held from 1945 to 1951 and again in 1953.

== Winners ==
| Year | Winner | Score | Margin of victory | Runner(s)-up | Venue | Ref. |
Daily Sketch Women's National Tournament
| 1945 | (England) Jeanne Bisgood | 75 | 3 strokes | (England) Gabrielle Style (England) Mervyn Sutherland Pilch | Royal Mid-Surrey | |
Daily Graphic Women's National Tournament
| 1946 | (England) Frances Stephens | 80 | 2 strokes | (England) Gabrielle Style | Royal Mid-Surrey | |
| 1947 | (England) Frances Stephens | 148 | 1 stroke | (England) Maureen Ruttle | Sudbury | |
| 1948 | (England) Frances Stephens | 147 | 6 strokes | (England) Gabrielle Style | Royal Mid-Surrey | |
| 1949 | (England) Frances Stephens | 154 | Playoff | (England) Diana Critchley | Wentworth | |
| 1950 | (England) Frances Stephens | 152 | 1 stroke | (England) Jeanne Bisgood | Wentworth | |
| 1951 | (England) Jeanne Bisgood | 149 | 3 strokes | (Scotland) Jean Donald (England) Ann Phillips | Wentworth | |
| 1952 | Not held | | | | | |
Sunday Graphic Women's National Tournament
| 1953 | (England) Frances Stephens | 315 | Countback | (Scotland) Jean Donald | Sunningdale | |
Spalding Women's Open Stroke Play
| 1954 | (Scotland) Jean Donald | 313 | 4 strokes | (England) Gabrielle Keiller | Walton Heath | |
| 1955 | (England) Elizabeth Price | 295 | 23 strokes | (England) Gabrielle Keiller | Walton Heath | |
| 1956 | (England) Marley Spearman | 308 | 3 strokes | (England) Elizabeth Price | Moor Park | |
| 1957 | (Scotland) Jessie Valentine | 291 | 2 strokes | (England) Marley Spearman | Moor Park | |
| 1958 | (England) Frances Smith | 301 | 6 strokes | (England) Marley Spearman | The Berkshire | |
| 1959 | (England) Elizabeth Price | 297 | 1 stroke | (England) Bridget Jackson | Worthing | |
