= Worplesdon Mixed Foursomes =

Mixed foursomes golf tournament

Tournament information
- Location: Brookwood, Surrey, England
- Established: 1921
- Course(s): Worplesdon Golf Club
- Format: Mixed foursomes match play
- Month played: October

The Worplesdon Open Scratch Mixed Foursomes is an open mixed foursomes golf tournament contested annually at the Worplesdon Golf Club in Surrey since 1921. From its inception until the 1960s the event attracted many of the leading amateur golfers. The event was open to professionals and attracted some British women golfers who had lost their amateur status by taking up paid positions with golf equipment makers.

Joyce Wethered, a member at Worplesdon, won the event eight times with seven different partners. She also lost two finals, in 1921 when partnered by her brother Roger and in 1948 when partnered by her husband John Heathcoat-Amory.

The event is still played. It currently consists of a 36-hole stableford stage on a Saturday, after which the leading four pairs play semi-finals and a final on the following day.

== Winners ==
The first final in 1921 was played over 18 holes but from 1922 to 1948 it was played over 36 holes, before reverting to 18 holes from 1949.

This list is incomplete

Year	Winners	Margin of victory	Runners-up	Ref
1921	(England) Eleanor Helme & (Scotland) Tony Torrance	3 & 2	(England) Joyce Wethered & (England) Roger Wethered	
1922	(England) Joyce Wethered & (England) Roger Wethered	2 & 1	(Scotland) Jessie Patey & (England) Noel Layton	
1923	(England) Joyce Wethered & (England) Cyril Tolley	6 & 5	(England) Muriel Macbeth & (England) Bernard Darwin	
1924	(England) Dorothy Fowler & (England) Noel Layton	8 & 7	(England) Joy Winn & F. Mead	
1925	(England) Cecil Leitch & Edward Esmond	2 & 1	(Scotland) Joan Gow & George Hannay	
1926	(France) Simone de la Chaume & (England) Roger Wethered	2 up	(England) Molly Gourlay & (Northern Ireland) Charles Hezlet	
1927	(England) Joyce Wethered & (England) Cyril Tolley	3 & 2	(France) Simone de la Chaume & (England) Roger Wethered	
1928	(England) Joyce Wethered & (England) John Morrison	1 up	(England) Nancye Gold & (England) Noel Layton	
1929	(England) Molly Gourlay & (Northern Ireland) Charles Hezlet	39 holes	(England) Joy Winn & Victor Longstaffe	
1930	(England) Molly Gourlay & (Northern Ireland) Charles Hezlet	5 & 4	(France) Diana Esmond & (England) Roger Wethered	
1931	(England) Joyce Wethered & (England) Michael Scott	4 & 3	(Scotland) Doris Park & (Scotland) Stuart Forsyth	
1932	(England) Joyce Wethered & (England) Raymond Oppenheimer	8 & 7	Audrey Regnart & J. R. Johnston	
1933	(England) Joyce Wethered & (England) Bernard Darwin	8 & 7	(England) Marjorie Ross Garon & (Scotland) Andrew McNair	
1934	(England) Molly Gourlay & (Scotland) Tony Torrance	6 & 5	(England) Kathleen Garnham & (England) Noel Layton	
1935	(England) Gwen Cradock-Hartopp & (England) John Cradock-Hartopp	2 & 1	(England) Jean Hamilton & (Scotland) Stuart Forsyth	
1936	(England) Joyce Wethered & (England) Thomas Coke	3 & 2	(England) Dorrit Wilkins & C. J. Anderson	
1937	(England) Molly Heppel & (England) Leonard Crawley	5 & 4	(England) Kathleen Garnham & (England) Guy Thompson	
1938	(England) Marjorie Ross Garon & (England) Eustace Storey	6 & 5	(England) Wanda Morgan & Kenneth Morrice	
1939–1945 Suspended during World War II
1946	(England) Jacqueline Gordon & (Wales) Tony Duncan	4 & 3	(England) Joan Pemberton & (England) Henry Longhurst	
1947	(England) Jacqueline Gordon & (Wales) Tony Duncan	8 & 7	(Republic of Ireland) Dorothy Beck & (England) John Beck	
1948	(England) Wanda Morgan & (England) Eustace Storey	5 & 4	(England) Joyce Heathcoat-Amory & (England) John Heathcoat-Amory	
1949	(England) Frances Stephens & (England) Leonard Crawley	4 & 3	(England) Diana Critchley & (England) Cyril Tolley	
1950	(England) Frances Stephens & (England) Leonard Crawley	6 & 5	(England) Elizabeth Johnston & (England) Peter Macdonald	
1951	(Scotland) Cathie Barclay & (England) George Evans	2 up	(Scotland) Marjorie Peel & (Scotland) George Mackie	
1952	(Scotland) Marjorie Peel & (Scotland) George Mackie	3 & 2	(England) Frances Stephens & (England) Tony Slark	
1953	(England) Jacqueline Gordon & (Wales) Graham Knipe	1 up	(England) Marley Spearman & (Wales) John Atkins	
1954	(England) Frances Stephens & (England) Tony Slark	2 up	(England) Jean McIntyre & (England) Philip Scrutton	
1955	(Republic of Ireland) Philomena Garvey & (England) Philip Scrutton	2 & 1	(England) Audrey van Oss & (Wales) George Duncan	
1956	(Czechoslovakia) Luisa Abrahams & (United States) William Henderson	3 & 1	(France) Odile Semelaigne & (England) Gerald Micklem	
1957	(Scotland) Betty Singleton & (Scotland) Dickson Smith	5 & 4	(England) Jacqueline Gordon & (United States) Harold Ridgley	
1958	(England) Angela Bonallack & (England) Michael Bonallack	4 & 3	(Scotland) Betty Singleton & (Scotland) Dickson Smith	
1959	(Scotland) Janette Robertson & (Scotland) Innes Wright	4 & 3	(Italy) Isa Goldschmid & (Wales) J. Tudor Davies	
1960	(England) Bridget Jackson & (England) Michael Burgess	2 & 1	(England) Veronica Beharrell & (England) John Beharrell	
1961	(England) Frances Smith & (England) Bruce Critchley	3 & 2	(England) Jill Woodside & John Thornhill	
1962	(France) Vicomtesse de St Sauveur & (England) David Frame	5 & 3	(Scotland) Wylda Clark & (England) Keith Warren	
1963	(Scotland) Jessie Valentine & John Behrend	4 & 3	(Italy) Isa Goldschmid & (England) Michael Burgess	
1964	(Scotland) Jessie Valentine & John Behrend	3 & 2	(England) Marley Spearman & (England) Alan Thirlwell	
1965	(Scotland) Jessie Valentine & John Behrend	1 up	(Scotland) Jean Anderson & (England) Clive Clark	
1966	(Scotland) Cathie Barclay & (England) David Miller	19 holes	(England) Elizabeth Mountain & (England) Peter Benka	
1967	(France) Catherine Lacoste & (Spain) José Gancedo	1 up	(Scotland) Cathie Barclay & (England) David Miller	
1968	(England) Dinah Oxley & (Netherlands) Joan Dudok van Heel	2 & 1	(Scotland) Jessie Valentine & Richard Brown	
1969	(England) Ruth Ferguson & (Scotland) Alistair Wilson	4 & 3	(England) Pam Tredinnick & (England) Bruce Critchley	
1970	Susan Roberts & (England) Reg Glading	2 & 1	Mary Roberts & George Cole	
1971	(England) Diane Frearson & Alan Smith	3 & 2	(Netherlands) Joyce de Witt Puyt & Jeremy Ward	
