= Pam Benka =

English amateur golfer

Personal information
- Full name: Pamela Mary Benka
- Nationality: England
- Born: 17 June 1946 (age 80) Worthing, Sussex, England

Career
- Sport: Golf
- Status: Amateur

Pamela Mary Benka (née Tredinnick; born 17 June 1946) is a former English amateur golfer. She won the 1964 Girls Amateur Championship and the 1967 Astor Prince's Trophy. She reached the semi-finals of the Ladies' British Open Amateur Championship in 1965. She played in the Curtis Cup in 1966 and 1968 and was the non-playing captain in 2002.

== Golf career ==
In August 1964, Benka reached the final of the inaugural English girls championship at Wollaton Park, losing 2 and 1 to Shirley Ward. Two weeks later, she won the Girls Amateur Championship at Camberley Heath, having beaten Ward at the 19th hole in the semi-finals and Kathleen Cumming 2 and 1 in the final. In April 1965, she won the French junior championship. In October, she reached the semi-finals of the Ladies' British Open Amateur Championship, losing to Brigitte Varangot, a match delayed a day by rain. In 1967, she won the 72-hole Astor Prince's Trophy by three strokes from Angela Bonallack, while in 1968, playing with Isa Goldschmid, she was runner-up in the Avia Foursomes. In 1969, she and Bruce Critchley reached the final of the Worplesdon Mixed Foursomes and in 1970 she won the Portuguese championship.

Benka was selected for the 1966 Curtis Cup team in Hot Springs, Virginia. She narrowly lost her foursomes match on the first day, playing with Liz Chadwick and halving her singles match against Nancy Syms in the final round of singles matches. Benka made her second appearance in the Curtis Cup at Royal County Down in 1968. She was only selected for the foursomes, losing both matches. The team led after the first day but the United States had the better of the second day and won by 3 points. Benka played in the 1967 Vagliano Trophy match at Royal Lytham, match that the Continent of Europe won by a single point.

Benka was the non-playing captain in the 2002 Curtis Cup match.

== Personal life ==
She was born in Worthing on 17 June 1946, the daughter of John Tredinnick and Mary née Lake. Mary was a golfer and had reached the semi-finals of the 1933 English Women's Amateur Championship at Royal North Devon. John's brother Steve Tredinnick played for England in the Men's Home Internationals. She married Peter Benka (1946–2007) in 1971. Peter Benka had played in the 1969 Walker Cup.

== Team appearances ==
- Curtis Cup (representing Great Britain & Ireland): 1966, 1968, 2002 (non-playing captain)
- Vagliano Trophy (representing Great Britain & Ireland): 1967
- Women's Home Internationals (representing England): 1967 (joint winners)
- England–Scotland girls match (representing England): 1963 (winners), 1964 (winners)
