= Astor Prince's Trophy =

Tournament information
- Location: Sandwich, Kent, England
- Established: 1961
- Course: Prince's Golf Club
- Format: Stroke play
- Final year: 1969

Final champion
- (Belgium) Corinne Reybroeck

The Astor Prince's Trophy was a women's 72-hole stroke play amateur golf tournament played at Prince's Golf Club in Sandwich, Kent from 1961 to 1969.

The event was dropped after 1969 because of a busy schedule. The Ladies' British Open Amateur Stroke Play Championship was established in 1969 and both events were played that year.

== Winners ==
Year	Winner	Score	Margin of victory	Runner-up	Ref.
1961	(England) Ruth Porter	295	7 strokes	(England) Angela Bonallack	
1962	(England) Angela Bonallack	301	12 strokes	(England) Ann Irvin	
1963	(England) Bridget Jackson	307	3 strokes	(England) Angela Bonallack	
1964	(England) Marley Spearman	284	1 stroke	(England) Angela Bonallack	
1965	(England) Marley Spearman	300	8 strokes	(England) Bridget Jackson	
1966	(France) Catherine Lacoste	292	6 strokes	(England) Liz Chadwick	
1967	(England) Pam Tredinnick	312	3 strokes	(England) Angela Bonallack	
1968	(England) Angela Bonallack	314	10 strokes	(Belgium) Corinne Reybroeck	
1969	(Belgium) Corinne Reybroeck	318	8 strokes	(Scotland) Jessie Valentine	

The event was revived in 1971 as a one-day 27-hole event, with Jennifer Smith winning. In 1972 Sally Barber and Angela Bonallack were joint winners. The event was then discontinued.
