= 2002 Curtis Cup =

Golf competition in Pittsburgh, Pennsylvania

Coordinates: 40.523°N 79.878°W

32nd Curtis Cup Match
- Dates: August 3–4, 2002
- Venue: Fox Chapel Golf Club
- Location: Pittsburgh, Pennsylvania
- Captains: Mary Budke (USA); Pam Benka (GB&I)
(United States)	11	7	(United Kingdom) (Republic of Ireland)
- United States wins the Curtis Cup

The 32nd Curtis Cup Match was played on August 3 and 4, 2002 at Fox Chapel Golf Club near Pittsburgh, Pennsylvania. The United States won 11 to 7. Carol Semple Thompson made her 12th and final appearance, having first played in 1974.

== Format ==
The contest was a two-day competition, with three foursomes and six singles matches on each day, a total of 18 points.

Each of the 18 matches was worth one point in the larger team competition. If a match was all square after the 18th hole extra holes were not played. Rather, each side earned 1/2 a point toward their team total. The team that accumulated at least 9 1/2 points won the competition. In the event of a tie, the current holder retained the Cup.

== Teams ==
Eight players for the USA and Great Britain & Ireland participated in the event plus one non-playing captain for each team.

Team USA
Name	Age	Notes
Mary Budke	48	non-playing captain
Emily Bastel	21
Meredith Duncan	22
Mollie Fankhauser	21
Leigh Anne Hardin	20
Angela Jerman	21
Laura Myerscough	22
Courtney Swaim	22
Carol Semple Thompson	53	played 11 times from 1974 to 2000

& Great Britain & Ireland
Name	Age	Notes
(England) Pam Benka	56	non-playing captain
(Northern Ireland) Alison Coffey	29
(England) Emma Duggleby	31	played in 2000
(England) Rebecca Hudson	23	played in 1998 and 2000
(Wales) Sarah Jones	19
(Scotland) Vikki Laing	21
(England) Fame More	21
(England) Kerry Smith	30
(Scotland) Heather Stirling	25

== Saturday's matches ==
=== Morning foursomes ===
&	Results
Hudson/Duggleby	(United States) 4 & 3	Duncan/Jerman
Stirling/Laing	(United States) 1 up	Fankhauser/Thompson
Smith/Coffey	(United States) 3 & 2	Swaim/Myerscough
0	Session	3
0	Overall	3

=== Afternoon singles ===
&	Results
Rebecca Hudson	(United Kingdom) (Republic of Ireland) 2 up	Emily Bastel
Emma Duggleby	(United States) 2 & 1	Leigh Anne Hardin
Fame More	(United States) 5 & 4	Meredith Duncan
Sarah Jones	(United States) 6 & 5	Angela Jerman
Heather Stirling	(United States) 4 & 2	Courtney Swaim
Vikki Laing	(United Kingdom) (Republic of Ireland) 1 up	Mollie Fankhauser
2	Session	4
2	Overall	7

== Sunday's matches ==
=== Morning foursomes ===
&	Results
Stirling/Laing	(United Kingdom) (Republic of Ireland) 3 & 1	Hardin/Bastel
Hudson/Smith	(United States) 4 & 2	Myerscough/Swaim
Duggleby/Coffey	(United Kingdom) (Republic of Ireland) 4 & 2	Duncan/Jerman
2	Session	1
4	Overall	8

=== Afternoon singles ===
&	Results
Rebecca Hudson	(United Kingdom) (Republic of Ireland) 3 & 1	Mollie Fankhauser
Vikki Laing	(United States) 1 up	Carol Semple Thompson
Emma Duggleby	(United Kingdom) (Republic of Ireland) 4 & 3	Leigh Anne Hardin
Heather Stirling	(United States) 2 up	Laura Myerscough
Alison Coffey	(United States) 3 & 1	Meredith Duncan
Sarah Jones	(United Kingdom) (Republic of Ireland) 5 & 3	Courtney Swaim
3	Session	3
7	Overall	11
