= 1956 Curtis Cup =

Golf competition in Sandwich, Kent, England

Coordinates: 51.296°N 1.370°E

9th Curtis Cup Match
- Dates: 8–9 June 1956
- Venue: Prince's Golf Club
- Location: Sandwich, Kent, England
- Captains: Zara Bolton (British Isles); Edith Flippin (USA)
(United Kingdom) (Republic of Ireland)	5	4	(United States)
- British Isles wins the Curtis Cup

The 9th Curtis Cup Match was played on 8 and 9 June 1956 at Prince's Golf Club in Sandwich, Kent, England. The British Isles won by 5 matches to 4, to win the Curtis Cup for the second time.

The United States won two of the three foursomes matches but the British Isles won four of the six singles to win by five matches to four.

== Format ==
The contest was played over two days, with three foursomes on the first day and six singles matches on the second day, a total of 9 points. Matches were over 36 holes.

Each of the 9 matches was worth one point in the larger team competition. If a match was all square after the 18th hole extra holes were not played. Rather, each side earned 1/2 a point toward their team total. The team that accumulated at least 5 points won the competition.

== Teams ==
& British Isles
Name	Notes
(England) Zara Bolton	non-playing captain
(England) Veronica Anstey
(Republic of Ireland) Philomena Garvey	played in 1948, 1950, 1952 and 1954
(England) Ann Howard
(England) Elizabeth Price	played in 1950, 1952 and 1954
(Scotland) Janette Robertson	played in 1954
(England) Frances Smith	played in 1950, 1952 and 1954
(Scotland) Jessie Valentine	played in 1936, 1938, 1950, 1952 and 1954
(England) Angela Ward

Howard did not play in any matches

United States
Name	Notes
Edith Flippin	non-playing captain
Carolyn Cudone
Mary Ann Downey
Patricia Lesser	played in 1954
Jane Nelson
Polly Riley	played in 1948, 1950, 1952 and 1954
Barbara Romack	played in 1954
Wiffi Smith

== Friday's foursomes matches ==
&	Results
Valentine/Garvey	(United States) 2 & 1	Lesser/Smith
Smith/Price	(United Kingdom) (Republic of Ireland) 5 & 3	Riley/Romack
Robertson/Anstey	(United States) 6 & 4	Downey/Cudone
1	Session	2
1	Overall	2

18-hole scores: Valentine/Garvey & Lesser/Smith all square, Smith/Price 2 up, Robertson/Anstey 2 up

== Saturday's singles matches ==
&	Results
Jessie Valentine	(United Kingdom) (Republic of Ireland) 6 & 4	Patricia Lesser
Philomena Garvey	(United States) 9 & 8	Wiffi Smith
Frances Smith	(United Kingdom) (Republic of Ireland) 1 up	Polly Riley
Janette Robertson	(United States) 6 & 4	Barbara Romack
Angela Ward	(United Kingdom) (Republic of Ireland) 4 & 3	Mary Ann Downey
Elizabeth Price	(United Kingdom) (Republic of Ireland) 7 & 6	Jane Nelson
4	Session	2
5	Overall	4

18-hole scores: Lesser 2 up, W. Smith 2 up, F. Smith/Riley all square, Romack 2 up, Ward 5 up, Price 9 up
