= Rock City Ladies Open =

Golf tournament formerly on the LPGA Tour

The Rock City Ladies Open was a golf tournament on the LPGA Tour, played only in 1963. It was played at the Valleybrook Golf & Country Club in Chattanooga, Tennessee. Barbara Romack won the event in a playoff over Shirley Englehorn.
