= Barbara McIntire =

American amateur golfer (1935–2025)

Personal information
- Full name: Barbara McIntire
- Nationality: United States
- Born: January 12, 1935 Toledo, Ohio, U.S.
- Died: May 6, 2025 (aged 90) Southern Pines, North Carolina, U.S.

Career
- Sport: Golf
- Status: Amateur

Barbara Joy McIntire (January 12, 1935 – May 6, 2025) was an American amateur golfer.

== Early life ==
McIntire was born in Toledo, Ohio on January 12, 1935. Her family moved to Florida shortly thereafter.

In Florida, she began playing golf as a young girl and at age 15 made a splash at the 1950 U.S. Women's Amateur by eliminating six-time Champion Glenna Collett Vare in the opening round. She finished runner-up at the 1951 and 1952 U.S. Girls' Junior.

== Golf career ==
In 1956, as a student at Rollins College in Winter Park, Florida, McIntire came close to becoming the first amateur to win the U.S. Women's Open. She was tied with professional Kathy Cornelius at the end of regulation play but lost in the ensuing playoff.

In the late 1950s, McIntire was one of the best female golfers in the world. In 1957, she won the North and South Women's Amateur for the first time. The following year, in 1958, she won the Women's Western Amateur for the first time too. In 1959 at the U.S. Women's Amateur she defeated the reigning champion Anne Quast in the quarter-finals and went on to win the tournament. The following year, she won the 1960 British Ladies Amateur becoming one of eight women to simultaneously hold the American and British titles and earning her the cover of Sports Illustrated magazine.

Through the 1960s, McIntire continued with success. She was a regular member of the U.S. Curtis Cup during the decade. In 1964, she also won her second U.S. Women's Amateur. She also won the North and South Women's Amateur regularly through the 1960s.

She went on to dedicate herself to the game of golf, serving on the United States Golf Association's Women's Committee from 1985 to 1996 and its chairperson in 1995 and 1996.

== Personal life ==
McIntire died May 6, 2025, at the age of 90.

== Awards and honors ==
- In 1964, McIntire was inducted into the Colorado Golf Hall of Fame.
- In 1995, McIntire was also inducted into the Ohio Golf Hall of Fame.
- In 1998, McIntire was inducted into the Colorado Sports Hall of Fame.
- In 2000, she was voted the Bob Jones Award, the highest honor given by the United States Golf Association in recognition of distinguished sportsmanship in golf.

== Amateur wins ==
- 1957 North and South Women's Amateur
- 1958 Women's Western Amateur
- 1959 U.S. Women's Amateur
- 1960 British Ladies Amateur, North and South Women's Amateur
- 1961 North and South Women's Amateur
- 1963 Women's Western Amateur
- 1964 U.S. Women's Amateur
- 1965 North and South Women's Amateur
- 1969 North and South Women's Amateur
- 1971 North and South Women's Amateur

== U. S. national Team appearances ==
Amateur

- Curtis Cup: 1958 (tie), 1960 (winners), 1962 (winners), 1964 (winners), 1966 (winners), 1972 (winners), 1976 (non-playing captain, winners), 1998 (non-playing captain, winners)
- Espirito Santo Trophy: 1964
