= 1960 Curtis Cup =

Golf competition in Worksop, Nottinghamshire, England

Coordinates: 53.336°N 1.173°W

11th Curtis Cup Match
- Dates: 20–21 May 1960
- Venue: Lindrick Golf Club
- Location: Worksop, Nottinghamshire, England
- Captains: Maureen Garrett (British Isles); Mildred Prunaret (USA)
(United Kingdom) (Republic of Ireland)	2 1/2	6 1/2	(United States)
- United States wins the Curtis Cup

The 11th Curtis Cup Match was played on 20 and 21 May 1960 at Lindrick Golf Club in Worksop, Nottinghamshire, England. The United States won by 6 1/2 matches to 2 1/2, to regain the Curtis Cup.

The United States won two of the three foursomes matches and then won four of the six singles with another match halved.

== Format ==
The contest was played over two days, with three foursomes on the first day and six singles matches on the second day, a total of 9 points. Matches were over 36 holes.

Each of the 9 matches was worth one point in the larger team competition. If a match was all square after the 18th hole extra holes were not played. Rather, each side earned 1/2 a point toward their team total. The team that accumulated at least 5 points won the competition.

== Teams ==
& British Isles
Name	Notes
(England) Maureen Garrett	non-playing captain
(England) Angela Bonallack	played in 1956 and 1958
(Republic of Ireland) Philomena Garvey	played in 1948, 1950, 1952, 1954 and 1956
(Scotland) Belle McCorkindale
(England) Ruth Porter
(England) Elizabeth Price	played in 1950, 1952, 1954, 1956 and 1958
(Scotland) Janette Robertson	played in 1954, 1956 and 1958
(England) Frances Smith	played in 1950, 1952, 1954, 1956 and 1958
(England) Marley Spearman

Marley Spearman did not play in any matches

United States
Name	Notes
Mildred Prunaret	non-playing captain
Judy Bell
Judy Eller
Joanne Goodwin
JoAnne Gunderson	played in 1958
Ann Casey Johnstone	played in 1958
Barbara McIntire	played in 1958
Anne Quast	played in 1958

== Friday's foursomes matches ==
&	Results
Bonallack/Price	(United Kingdom) (Republic of Ireland) 1 up	Gunderson/McIntire
McCorkindale/Robertson	(United States) 4 & 2	Eller/Quast
Porter/Smith	(United States) 3 & 2	Goodwin/Johnstone
1	Session	2
1	Overall	2

18-hole scores: Gunderson/McIntire 4 up, Eller/Quast 3 up, Goodwin/Johnstone 6 up

== Saturday's singles matches ==
Ruth Porter was a late replacement for Frances Smith who was due to play in the final singles match.

&	Results
Elizabeth Price	halved	Barbara McIntire
Angela Bonallack	(United States) 2 & 1	JoAnne Gunderson
Janette Robertson	(United States) 2 up	Anne Quast
Philomena Garvey	(United States) 4 & 3	Judy Eller
Belle McCorkindale	(United States) 8 & 7	Judy Bell
Ruth Porter	(United Kingdom) (Republic of Ireland) 1 up	Joanne Goodwin
1 1/2	Session	4 1/2
2 1/2	Overall	6 1/2

18-hole scores: Price 3 up, Gunderson 3 up, Quast 1 up, Eller 3 up, Bell 7 up, Porter 1 up
