= Morfontaine =

- Commune
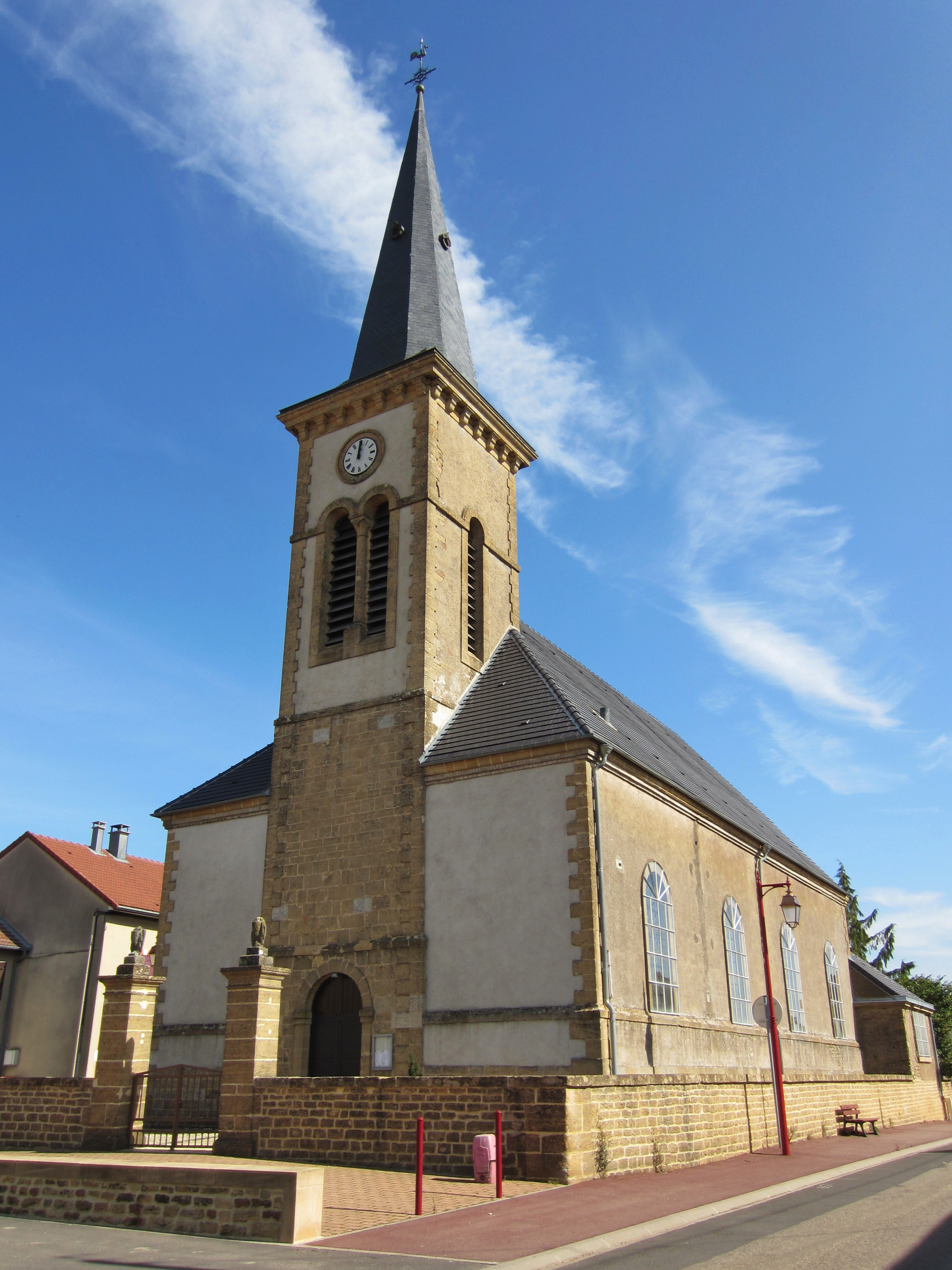
- The church in Morfontaine

- Coat of arms
- Location of Morfontaine
- Location within France Location within Grand Est
- Coordinates: 49°26′43″N 5°48′33″E
- Country: France
- Region: Grand Est
- Department: Meurthe-et-Moselle
- Arrondissement: Val-de-Briey
- Canton: Villerupt
- Intercommunality: Grand Longwy Agglomération

Government
  - Mayor (2020–2026): José Pluvinet
- Area^{1}: 11.42 km^{2} (4.41 sq mi)
- Elevation: 374 m (1,227 ft)
- Highest elevation: 404 m (1,325 ft)
- Lowest elevation: 275 m (902 ft)
- Population (2023): 1,073
  - Density: 93.96/km^{2} (243.4/sq mi)
- Time zone: UTC+01:00 (CET)
  - Summer (DST): UTC+02:00 (CEST)
- INSEE/Postal code: 54385 /54920
- ^{1} French Land Register data, which excludes lakes, ponds, glaciers > 1 km^{2} (0.386 sq mi or 247 acres) and river estuaries.

Morfontaine (French pronunciation: [mɔʁfɔ̃tɛn]) is a commune in the Meurthe-et-Moselle department in north-eastern France.

== See also ==
- Communes of the Meurthe-et-Moselle department
