= Philomena Garvey =

Irish golfer

Philomena Garvey (26 April 1926 – 5 May 2009) was an Irish amateur golfer, the daughter of James and Kathleen Garvey (née Owens). She was born in the village of Baltray, which is on the north shore of the Boyne estuary approximately four miles from the town of Drogheda.

== Career ==
In 1946, at age 20, Garvey won the first of fifteen Irish Women's Amateur Close Championships. She won again in 1947 and 1948 and was not beaten until the second round in 1949. She won again in 1950 and 1951 and was beaten for the second time, again the second round, in 1952. From 1953 to 1963 she was unbeaten in the event, winning it 9 further times, missing the event in 1956, when it clashed with Curtis Cup practice and in 1961, when she sustained an ankle injury during the Women's Amateur Championship. She represented Ireland at the Women's Home Internationals, eighteen times, every year from 1947 until 1969, except 1955 when she withdrew through injury and from 1964 to 1967 when as a professional she was ineligible to play. In 1964 she became Ireland's first female professional golfer but eventually had her amateur status re-instated in 1968.

On 27 June 1957, she won the British Ladies Amateur at Gleneagles and was finalist on four other occasions; 1946 (Hunstanton),1953 (Royal Portcawl), 1960 (Harlech) and 1963 (Royal County Down). She won the Worplesdon Mixed Foursomes in 1955, partnered with Philip Scrutton.

Garvey was selected seven times for Great Britain and Ireland to compete for the biennial Curtis Cup team event between 1948 and 1960 during which she was on the winning side on two occasions, in 1952 and 1956. In 1958 she withdrew from the event in protest against the Union Jack, the national flag of the United Kingdom, being the sole emblem on the team sweaters. The emblem was thereafter changed for the 1960 event. In 1951, Garvey was selected as part of a six-person European team to compete for the Weathervane international trophy against a U.S. professional side at Sunningdale during which Babe Zaharias narrowly defeated her.

Garvey's final victory in her national championship came at Royal Portrush in 1970, after which she announced her retirement from international golf. She lived and worked in Dublin for most of her life. She died on 5 May 2009 due to old age.

== Team appearances ==
Amateur

- Curtis Cup (representing Great Britain & Ireland): 1948, 1950, 1952 (winners), 1954, 1956 (winners), 1960
- Vagliano Trophy (representing Great Britain & Ireland): 1949 (winners), 1951 (winners), 1953 (winners), 1955 (winners), 1957 (winners), 1959 (winners), 1963 (winners)
- Women's Home Internationals (representing Ireland): 1947, 1948, 1949, 1950, 1951, 1952, 1953, 1954, 1956, 1957, 1958, 1959, 1960, 1961, 1962, 1963, 1968, 1969
