= Anne Quast =

American amateur golfer

Personal information
- Nationality: United States
- Born: August 31, 1937 (age 89) Everett, Washington, U.S.

Career
- Sport: Golf
- College: Stanford University
- Status: Amateur

Best results in LPGA major championships
- Titleholders C'ship: 2nd: 1957
- Chevron Championship: DNP
- Women's PGA C'ship: DNP
- U.S. Women's Open: 4th: 1973
- du Maurier Classic: DNP
- Women's British Open: DNP

Anne Quast (born August 31, 1937) is an American amateur golfer. She won the U.S. Women's Amateur three times (1958, 1961, 1963) and was runner-up three times (1965, 1968, 1973). She was married several times and also played as Anne Decker, Anne Welts, and Anne Sander.

== Early life ==
In 1937, Quast was born in Everett, Washington. Her parents owned the Cedarcrest Golf Course in Marysville, Washington and by age 12 she had played in her first tournament.

She won the Washington State Junior Girls Championship in 1952, 1954 and 1955.

== College career ==
In 1955, Quast entered Stanford University. That year she won her state's Women's championship. She repeated as the Washington State Women's champion the following year. In 1957, Quast played the Titleholders Championship, an LPGA event. As an amateur, she finished runner-up to professional star Patty Berg.

Always composed under pressure, Quast's strong short game got her to the U.S. Women's Amateur quarter-finals in 1955, and to the semi-finals in 1956. While a student at Stanford University in 1958, she won the first of her three U.S. Women's Amateur. In 1959, Quast graduated from Stanford.

== Career ==
In 1961, she was living in Seattle where she taught school. Now married, Anne Quast-Decker won the U.S. Women's Amateur again, setting a tournament record for her margin of victory, by 14 and 13; this record still stands. In 1963, after marrying for the second time, Anne Quast-Welts defeated Peggy Conley to win her third U.S. championship. She also made it to the finals in 1965, 1968, and 1973.

In the 1970s, she primarily lived in Britain. In 1980, she was back home in the U.S., but returned to England to compete again in the British Ladies Amateur, which she won. At Pinehurst in North Carolina she won the 1982 and 1983 North and South Women's Amateur. In her first year of eligibility at age fifty, Quast won the 1987 U.S. Senior Women's Amateur then again in 1989, 1990 and 1993.

Quast was a member of the U.S. Curtis Cup team in 1958, 1960, 1962, 1966, 1968, 1974, 1984, and 1990; across five decades. Her eight appearances ranks her second all-time to Carol Semple. She was also a member of the Espirito Santo Trophy team in 1966, 1968 and 1988; the U.S. team captured the trophy on all three occasions.

== Personal life ==
In the early 1960s, Quast married Dr. Jay D. Decker. The marriage only last a few years. In 1963, she married Mr. Welts. By the 1970s, however, they were divorced.

In the 1970s, Quast married Steve Sander. The couple lived in the United Kingdom from 1974 to 1979.

== Awards and honors ==
- Quast is a member of the Stanford University Athletic Hall of Fame.
- In 1997, Quast was inducted into the State of Washington Sports Hall of Fame.
- In 1999, she was inducted into the Pacific Northwest Golf Association Hall of Fame.
- In his 2001 book, The Golf 100: Ranking the Greatest Golfers of All Time, the author Robert McCord ranked Quast the 37th best golfer of all time.

== Amateur wins ==
this list is probably incomplete

- 1952 Washington State Junior Girls'
- 1954 Washington State Junior Girls', Women's Western Junior Girls'
- 1955 Washington State Junior Girls', Washington State Women's Amateur
- 1956 Washington State Women's Amateur, Hollywood Women's Invitational Four-Ball Champion (with Ruth Jessen), Women's South Atlantic Amateur, Women's Western Amateur
- 1957 Helen Lee Doherty Invitational
- 1958 U.S. Women's Amateur
- 1961 U.S. Women's Amateur, Women's Western Amateur
- 1963 U.S. Women's Amateur
- 1980 British Ladies Amateur
- 1982 North and South Women's Amateur
- 1983 North and South Women's Amateur
- 1985 California Women's Amateur Championship
- 1987 U.S. Senior Women's Amateur
- 1988 Women's Western Amateur
- 1989 U.S. Senior Women's Amateur
- 1990 U.S. Senior Women's Amateur
- 1993 U.S. Senior Women's Amateur

== U.S. national team appearances ==
Amateur

- Curtis Cup: 1958 (tie), 1960 (winners), 1962 (winners), 1966 (winners), 1968 (winners), 1974 (winners), 1984 (winners), 1990 (winners)
- Espirito Santo Trophy: 1966 (winners), 1968 (winners), 1988 (winners)
