= Frances Stephens (golfer) =

English golfer

Frances "Bunty" Stephens (married name Frances Stephens Smith or Frances Smith Stephens; 26 July 1924 – 23 July 1978) was an English amateur golfer.

== Early life ==
In 1924, Stephens was born in Lancashire. Her father Fred was club professional at Bootie Golf Club. She faced discrimination from golf administrators because of his working class occupation.

== Golf career ==
During the 1940s and 1950s, she was, according to The Bolton News, "Britain's No. 1 woman golfer." In 1948, she won the English Women's Amateur Championship. She was also victorious in 1954 and 1955. In 1959, she finished runner-up. She also won the British Ladies Amateur in 1949 and 1954 and earned runner-up honors in 1951 and 1952. Her home club was Royal Birkdale.

She played in all six Curtis Cups from 1950 to 1960, and was non-playing captain of the Great Britain and Ireland team in 1962 and 1972. Her final-hole victories over Polly Riley in the 1956 and 1958 tournaments secured a win and a draw, respectively, for the British and Irish team, the first time it retained the cup. According to Sports Illustrated, in the United States she was "hardly known." She did manage to tie for 6th place at the 1949 U.S. Women's Open though. She was also a non-playing captain of the British team in the Vagliano Trophy.

Legendary golf writer Herbert Warren Wind referred to her a "slight, quiet, entirely undramatic girl" and an outstanding clutch player. English golfer Enid Wilson wrote she had "a very frail physique but ... the temperament of a tigress." Her swing had a pronounced hiatus at the top, which Wind called "most unimpressive," although Henry Cotton said she had "one of the prettiest swings in the game."

In the 1960s, Stephens curtailed her playing career to raise her daughter but subsequently was active in golf administration and developing junior golf.

== Personal life ==
In 1955, she married Roy Smith, a Scottish Airlines pilot. In 1957, he died in a plane crash in Libya. They had one daughter.

In 1978, she died from cancer.

== Amateur wins ==
- 1948 English Women's Amateur Championship
- 1949 British Ladies Amateur
- 1954 British Ladies Amateur, English Women's Amateur Championship
- 1955 English Women's Amateur Championship

== Awards and honours ==
She was made OBE for "services to Ladies Golf" at the 1977 New Year Honours.

== Team appearances ==
- Curtis Cup (representing Great Britain & Ireland): 1950, 1952 (winners), 1954, 1956 (winners), 1958 (tied), 1960, 1962 (non-playing captain), 1972 (non-playing captain)
- Vagliano Trophy (representing Great Britain & Ireland): 1947 (winners), 1948 (winners), 1949 (winners), 1953 (winners), 1955 (winners), 1959 (winners), 1971 (non-playing captain, winners)
- Commonwealth Trophy (representing Great Britain): 1959 (winners), 1963 (winners)
