= Jessie Valentine =

Scottish amateur golfer (1915–2006)

Jessie Valentine MBE
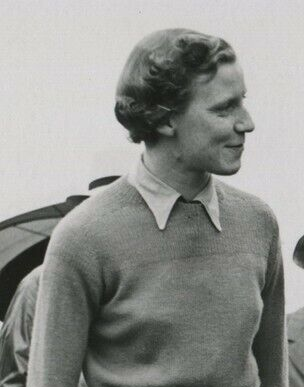
- Valentine in 1938

Personal information
- Full name: Jessie Anderson Valentine
- Nationality: Scotland
- Born: 18 March 1915 Perth, Scotland
- Died: 6 April 2006 (aged 91)

Career
- Sport: Golf
- Status: Amateur

Jessie Valentine (née Anderson) MBE (18 March 1915 – 6 April 2006) was a Scottish amateur golfer who won the British Ladies Amateur in 1937, 1955 and 1958. In 1937, after winning the British Ladies title at Turnberry she was the world number one ranking ladies golfer. Valentine was one of the dominant figures in women's golf for a period which spanned two decades from the mid-1930s to the mid-1950s. In 1959, she was the first woman golfer to be appointed as an MBE for services to golf and she was inducted into the Scottish Sports Hall of Fame in 2003. She was considered one of Perthshire's greatest sporting personalities of all time and was known locally as "Wee Jessie" and the "Queen of Golf".

== Early life ==
Valentine was born Jessie Anderson in Perth, Scotland on 18 March 1915. Her father, Joe Anderson, was for some time the professional at Craigie Hill Golf Club in Perth. She started playing golf aged five and was trained by her father, who entered her in the British Girls Championships at Stoke Poges in 1932. She went on to win the Girls Amateur Championship in 1933.

== Amateur career ==
In the 1930s, women had little chance of playing outside the amateur system, as there were no professional tournaments and jobs as club professionals were extremely rare. In 1935, Valentine (as Miss Anderson) became the New Zealand Ladies Champion, and the following year the French Ladies Champion. She was a member of the Great Britain and Ireland Curtis Cup team in 1936, famously holing a 60-foot putt on the 18th hole at Gleneagles to secure a win and help the team tie with the United States. She represented Great Britain and Ireland in the Curtis Cup seven times between 1936 and 1958.

Valentine won her first British Ladies title at Turnberry in 1937, beating Doris Park (daughter of the famous Willie Park, Jnr from Musselburgh, Scotland) 6&4 in the final. In 1938 she won the first of her six victories in the Scottish Ladies' Amateur Championship and retained the title in 1939. She did not compete between 1939 and 1945 due to the Second World War. During the war, she drove a truck for the Auxiliary Territorial Service (ATS).

Valentine won the Scottish Ladies' Amateur Championship in 1951, 1953, 1955 and 1956. In 1955, she won her second British Amateur title at Royal Portrush having been runner up in 1950. She became the first holder of both the British and Scottish women's championships in the same year. In 1957 she won the Spalding Women's Open Stroke Play at Moor Park. Valentine won the British Amateur title for the third and final time at Hunstanton Golf Club, Norfolk in 1958, her third final in four years. She went into the tournament with a remarkable record and was rated as one of the favorites. In contrast to her two previous successes the 1958 win was a much tighter affair, with Valentine overcoming Elizabeth Park by a single hole in a closely contested match.

== Professional career ==
In 1960, at the age of 45, Valentine turned professional.

Partnered with John Behrend, Valentine won the Worplesdon Mixed Foursomes three years in succession from 1963 to 1965. She reached the final again in 1968, playing with Richard Brown. In 1969, she was runner-up in the Astor Prince's Trophy.

After her retirement, Valentine wrote a book Better Golf - Definitely in 1967. She was invited to 'hansel' the new golf course at Gleneagles with golf legend Jack Nicklaus and partnered tennis player Virginia Wade at the age of 78. In 1999, she donated mementos of her career to Perth and Kinross Council's archives.

== Personal life ==
Valentine was married for 51 years to George Valentine, a Perth and Kinross councillor, who ran the company Valentine's Motors. They had one son, Iain, born in 1948.

== Death and legacy ==
Valentine died at Moncreiffe Nursing Home, Bridge of Earn, on 6 April 2006, aged 91 years. Her death was announced by Peter Alliss during live coverage of The Masters on the BBC. Flags flew at half mast at Craigie Hill and Blairgowrie Golf Clubs, where she held honorary membership.

Valentine's career was the subject of a retrospective exhibition at Perth Museum and Art Gallery in 2019. She was also the subject of a biographical book, Wee Jessie: Jessie Valentine: Whose Golf Swing Lasted a Lifetime, written by Dr Eve Souslby and launched at the exhibition in 2019.

== Awards and honors ==
- Valentine was appointed a Member of The Order of the British Empire (MBE) in the 1959 New Year Honours for services to women's golf.
- In 1967, she was awarded the Frank Moran Trophy for the "Scot who has done most for the game of golf."
- In 1992, Valentine received the DK Thomson Award, awarded annually to residents of Perth and Kinross for outstanding achievement.
- In 2003, she was inducted into the Scottish Sports Hall of Fame.
- In 2020, Valentine was inducted into Scottish Women in Sport Hall of Fame.

== Amateur wins ==
- 1933 Girls Amateur Championship
- 1935 New Zealand Ladies Amateur Championship
- 1936 French Ladies Amateur Championship
- 1937 British Ladies Amateur
- 1938 Scottish Ladies' Amateur Championship
- 1939 Scottish Ladies' Amateur Championship
- 1951 Scottish Ladies' Amateur Championship
- 1953 Scottish Ladies' Amateur Championship
- 1955 British Ladies Amateur, Scottish Ladies' Amateur Championship
- 1956 Scottish Ladies' Amateur Championship
- 1958 British Ladies Amateur

== Team appearances ==
Amateur

- Curtis Cup (representing Great Britain & Ireland): 1936 (tie), 1938, 1950, 1952 (winners), 1954, 1956 (winners), 1958 (tied)
- Vagliano Trophy (representing Great Britain & Ireland): 1947 (winners), 1949 (winners), 1951 (winners), 1955 (winners)
