= Prince's Golf Club =

Links golf course in Sandwich in Kent in South East England

Coordinates: 51.2911°N 1.3729°E

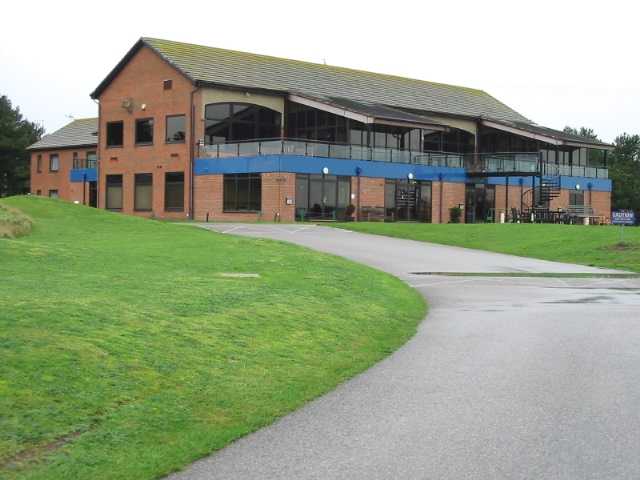
- The clubhouse
- Interactive map of Prince's Golf Club

Club information
- Location: Sandwich, Kent, England
- Established: 1906
- Type: private
- Tota holes: 27 three loops of nine holes (“Shore”, “Dunes” and “Himalayas”)
- Tournaments: The Open Championship
- Website: princesgolfclub.co.uk
- Designed by: Charles Hutchings; Guy Campbell and John Morrison
- Par: 107 (36 (Shore) 36 (Dunes) 36 (Himalayas))

Prince's Golf Club is a links golf course located in Sandwich in Kent in southeast England. Prince's is immediately adjacent to the more famous Royal St George's golf club, and both clubs lie on the same stretch of coastline as nearby Royal Cinque Ports Golf Club. Prince's hosted the 1932 Open Championship.

== History ==
Prince's was financed by Sir Harry Mallaby-Deeley, built and designed by Charles Hutchings, the 1902 Amateur Champion on land donated by the Earl of Guilford. It was completed late in 1906 as an 18-hole course, and was the first course designed to counter the significantly longer Haskell ball. Club captain A.J. Balfour, a former British Prime Minister, drove the first ball in the Founder's Vase in June 1907.

The present-day 27-hole layout is the result of a 1950 re-design following war-time damage to the original course. World War II was very hard on Prince's, but Australian entrepreneur Sir Aynsley Bridgland intervened, engaging Sir Guy Campbell and John Morrison to re-design and restore the course. The new layout incorporated 14 of the original greens (but with most played from different directions to the original course), and eliminated any blind tee or approach shots. The re-design always envisaged a centrally located clubhouse, and this was finally opened in 1985 by Peter Alliss, allowing the 27 holes to be played in three loops of nine holes, known as “Shore”, “Dunes” and “Himalayas”, each starting and finishing beside the new clubhouse.

The Lodge (previously the clubhouse)

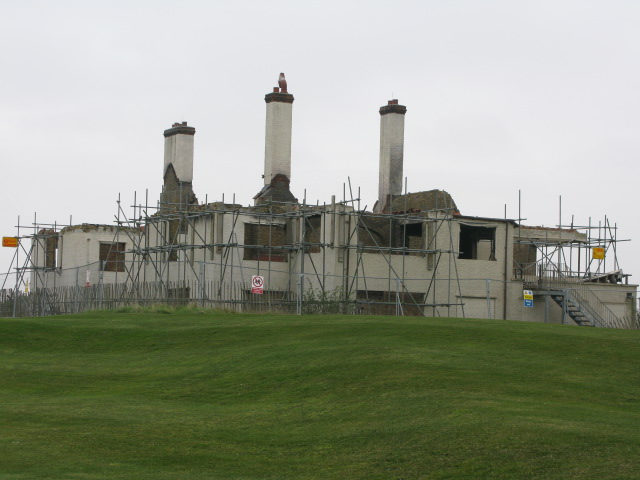
The fire damaged remains of the clubhouse in 2009

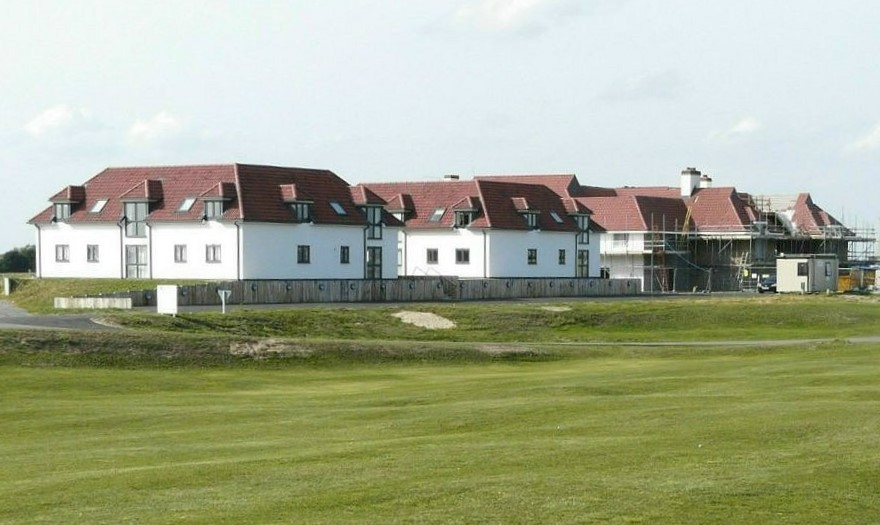
The Lodge, opened in 2012

The original clubhouse still stands at the entrance to the course and adjacent to the 14th tee of Royal St. George's. It no longer serves as the clubhouse but instead has been completely renovated, called the Lodge, it opened in May 2012, with two adjoining buildings, which house 38 bedrooms and a brasserie.

Prince's hosted the 1932 Open Championship, which was won by the American Gene Sarazen. Sarazen debuted his newly invented sand iron at the Championship, and his original club was on display at Prince's for many years, until insurance costs became prohibitively expensive. The greenside bunker beside the 9th green on the Himalayas course, a bunker he played from on his way to victory, was unveiled as the Sarazen Bunker in his honour by Pádraig Harrington in June 2011.

Prince's is the only club to host The Open just once. The club remains an Open Championship Local Final Qualifying course, and hosted qualifying in 2011 when The Open returned to Royal St. George's. Prince's professional golfer Francis McGuirk finished tied second to claim one of the three available spaces.

Prince's has also hosted other senior and minor professional tournaments, and a number of tournaments for amateurs, including the 1956 Curtis Cup, the 2006 Amateur Championship (co-hosted with Royal St George's), the 2006 Ladies' British Open Amateur Stroke Play Championship, the 2008 Senior Open Amateur Championship (co-hosted with Royal Cinque Ports Golf Club) and the 2013 Amateur Championship (co-hosted with Royal Cinque Ports Golf Club). The club is scheduled to host the 2030 Walker Cup.

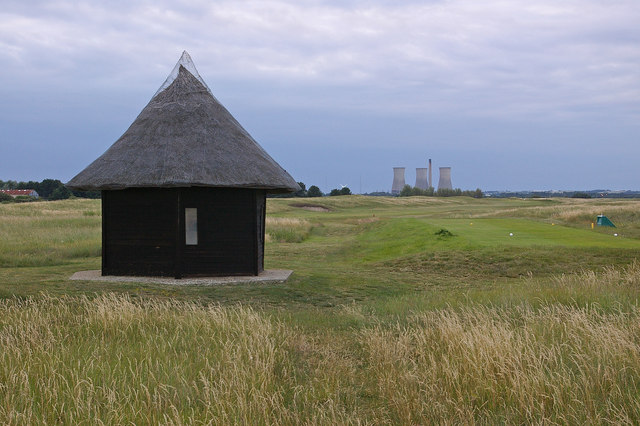
Shelter on the course

The WWII ace, Member of Parliament and 1949 Walker Cup captain Laddie Lucas was born in the old clubhouse at Prince's, his father being the first club secretary. During WWII, Lucas used his knowledge of the course to make an emergency landing after his Spitfire was crippled over northern France. Today, a commemorative plaque by the 4th tee on the Himalayas course marks the spot where he landed. In memory of Lucas, Prince's hosts an annual golf tournament, the Laddie Lucas Spoon, for boys and girls aged 8–13 years.

Phil Mickelson and Gary Player are both honorary life members of Prince's Golf Club. Ladies European Tour player Helen Wadsworth is a former member and played at Prince's as a junior.

In August 2009 Troon Golf announced an agreement to take over course management at Prince's and the club has undertaken a number of renovations to the course.

== Scorecards ==
Princes Golf Club Scorecards

Prince's Shore & Dunes
| Tee | Rating/Slope | 1 | 2 | 3 | 4 | 5 | 6 | 7 | 8 | 9 | Out | 10 | 11 | 12 | 13 | 14 | 15 | 16 | 17 | 18 | In | Total |
| Par | Men's | 4 | 5 | 3 | 4 | 3 | 4 | 4 | 5 | 4 | 36 | 4 | 3 | 5 | 4 | 4 | 5 | 4 | 3 | 4 | 36 | 72 |
| SI | Men's | 6 | 12 | 16 | 4 | 18 | 14 | 2 | 8 | 10 | | 3 | 15 | 11 | 1 | 5 | 9 | 17 | 13 | 7 |
| Blue | 74.8 / 128 | 452 | 562 | 189 | 415 | 158 | 423 | 434 | 568 | 442 | 3643 | 458 | 170 | 569 | 438 | 416 | 506 | 371 | 220 | 486 | 3634 | 7277 |
| White | 72.6 / 122 | 426 | 530 | 173 | 410 | 137 | 383 | 405 | 542 | 413 | 3419 | 440 | 155 | 527 | 408 | 394 | 495 | 357 | 198 | 462 | 3436 | 6855 |
| Yellow | 70.2 / 116 | 417 | 468 | 137 | 387 | 110 | 336 | 378 | 522 | 385 | 3140 | 420 | 150 | 484 | 375 | 365 | 460 | 325 | 186 | 424 | 3189 | 6329 |
| Par | Women's | 4 | 5 | 3 | 4 | 3 | 4 | 4 | 5 | 4 | 36 | 5 | 3 | 5 | 4 | 4 | 5 | 4 | 3 | 5 | 38 | 74 |
| SI | Women's | 9 | 7 | 17 | 3 | 15 | 13 | 11 | 1 | 5 | | 4 | 18 | 6 | 12 | 10 | 2 | 14 | 16 | 8 |
| Red | 71.5 / 124 | 325 | 431 | 124 | 339 | 103 | 282 | 303 | 512 | 340 | 2759 | 400 | 140 | 397 | 315 | 324 | 415 | 286 | 151 | 364 | 2792 | 5551 |

Prince's Dunes & Himalayas
| Tee | Rating/Slope | 1 | 2 | 3 | 4 | 5 | 6 | 7 | 8 | 9 | Out | 10 | 11 | 12 | 13 | 14 | 15 | 16 | 17 | 18 | In | Total |
| Par | Men's | 4 | 3 | 5 | 4 | 4 | 5 | 4 | 3 | 4 | 36 | 4 | 5 | 4 | 4 | 3 | 5 | 3 | 4 | 4 | 36 | 72 |
| SI | Men's | 4 | 16 | 14 | 2 | 6 | 10 | 18 | 12 | 8 | | 13 | 5 | 11 | 3 | 17 | 1 | 7 | 15 | 9 |
| Blue | 75.2 / 136 | 458 | 170 | 569 | 438 | 416 | 506 | 371 | 220 | 486 | 3634 | 381 | 620 | 408 | 458 | 143 | 609 | 197 | 347 | 448 | 3611 | 7245 |
| White | 72.8 / 130 | 440 | 155 | 527 | 408 | 394 | 495 | 357 | 198 | 462 | 3436 | 377 | 575 | 372 | 433 | 135 | 556 | 190 | 312 | 426 | 3376 | 6812 |
| Yellow | 70.3 / 123 | 420 | 150 | 484 | 375 | 365 | 460 | 325 | 186 | 424 | 3189 | 363 | 540 | 312 | 391 | 116 | 524 | 170 | 289 | 378 | 3083 | 6272 |
| Par | Women's | 5 | 3 | 5 | 4 | 4 | 5 | 4 | 3 | 5 | 38 | 4 | 5 | 4 | 4 | 3 | 5 | 3 | 4 | 4 | 36 | 74 |
| SI | Women's | 5 | 17 | 3 | 7 | 9 | 1 | 13 | 15 | 1 | | 14 | 6 | 12 | 4 | 18 | 2 | 8 | 16 | 10 |
| Red | 72.6 / 129 | 400 | 140 | 397 | 315 | 324 | 415 | 286 | 151 | 364 | 2792 | 348 | 500 | 294 | 335 | 103 | 470 | 141 | 278 | 349 | 2818 | 5610 |

Prince's Himalayas & Shore
| Tee | Rating/Slope | 1 | 2 | 3 | 4 | 5 | 6 | 7 | 8 | 9 | Out | 10 | 11 | 12 | 13 | 14 | 15 | 16 | 17 | 18 | In | Total |
| Par | Men's | 4 | 5 | 4 | 4 | 3 | 5 | 3 | 4 | 4 | 36 | 4 | 5 | 3 | 4 | 3 | 4 | 4 | 5 | 4 | 36 | 72 |
| SI | Men's | 14 | 6 | 12 | 4 | 18 | 2 | 8 | 16 | 10 | | 5 | 11 | 15 | 3 | 17 | 13 | 1 | 7 | 9 |
| Blue | 75.2 / 133 | 381 | 620 | 408 | 458 | 143 | 609 | 197 | 347 | 448 | 3611 | 452 | 562 | 189 | 415 | 158 | 423 | 434 | 568 | 442 | 3643 | 7254 |
| White | 72.8 / 125 | 377 | 575 | 372 | 433 | 135 | 556 | 190 | 312 | 426 | 3376 | 426 | 530 | 173 | 410 | 137 | 383 | 405 | 542 | 413 | 3419 | 6795 |
| Yellow | 70.1 / 120 | 363 | 540 | 312 | 391 | 116 | 524 | 170 | 289 | 378 | 3083 | 417 | 468 | 137 | 387 | 110 | 336 | 378 | 522 | 385 | 3140 | 6223 |
| Par | Women's | 4 | 5 | 4 | 4 | 3 | 5 | 3 | 4 | 4 | 36 | 4 | 5 | 3 | 4 | 3 | 4 | 4 | 5 | 4 | 36 | 72 |
| SI | Women's | 13 | 5 | 11 | 3 | 17 | 1 | 7 | 15 | 9 | | 10 | 8 | 18 | 4 | 16 | 14 | 12 | 2 | 6 |
| Red | 72.3 / 126 | 348 | 500 | 294 | 335 | 103 | 470 | 141 | 278 | 349 | 2818 | 325 | 431 | 124 | 339 | 103 | 282 | 303 | 512 | 340 | 2759 | 5577 |

== The Open Championship ==
Prince's Golf Club hosted The Open Championship in 1932.

| Year | Winner | Score | | | | |
| Year | Winner | R1 | R2 | R3 | R4 | Total |
|---|---|---|---|---|---|---|
| 1932 | (United States) Gene Sarazen ^{1st} | 70 | 69 | 70 | 74 | 283 |

- Note: Superscript number besides the player's name is the number of the Open Championship in their respective careers.
