= Curtis Cup =

Biennial team competition for women amateur golfers

Tournament information
- Location: 2026: Los Angeles, California
- Established: 1932
- Course: 2026: Bel-Air Country Club
- Format: Match play

Current champion
- United States

Current tournament
- 2026 Curtis Cup

The Curtis Cup is the best known team trophy for women amateur golfers, awarded in the biennial Curtis Cup Match. It is co-organised by the United States Golf Association and The R&A and is contested by teams representing the United States and "Great Britain and Ireland". The same two teams originally contested the Ryder Cup, but unlike that competition, the Curtis Cup has not widened the Great Britain and Ireland team to include all Europeans (nor has the analogous event for amateur men, the Walker Cup). Many women who have gone on to become stars of women's professional golf have played in the Curtis Cup.

== History ==
In 1905 an informal match had been played at Royal Cromer Golf Club between teams of American and British golfers, before the British Ladies Amateur Championship. The Amateur Championship started on Tuesday 30 May and it was originally planned to play the match on Monday 29 May, with a triangular competition between England, Scotland and Ireland being held from 25 to 27 May. Eventually the Britain/America match was played on 25 May with the triangular matches played on 26 and 27 May. The Britain/America match followed the same format as the triangular matches and involved seven 18-hole singles matches with extra holes played if necessary. The match resulted in a 6–1 win for the British team. Georgianna Bishop was the only American winner, beating Lottie Dod in the first match at the 20th hole. Margaret Curtis lost to May Hezlet while Harriot Curtis lost to Elinor Nevile.

Harriot and Margaret Curtis later donated a trophy for a regular series of matches between teams from America and Britain, wanting to promote the international friendships in the world of women's golf. The cup was inscribed, "To stimulate friendly rivalry among the women golfers of many lands." Discussions between various golf associations had been underway since 1924—the Curtis sisters had originally donated the trophy in 1927 to help these discussions along—but it was not until 1931 that the USGA and LGU agreed to co-sponsor the event. It was hoped that the French Golf Union would participate, but that never happened, the French and British teams playing each other in a separate match, first played in 1931.

An unofficial match between America and Britain was played at Sunningdale Golf Club on 1 May 1930 but was not organised by the USGA and LGU. There were five foursomes matches followed by ten singles matches in the afternoon. The match was level after the foursomes, with each team winning two matches and one match halved. Britain won six of the ten singles matches to win the contest.

The first match organised by the USGA and LGU was played in May 1932 at the Wentworth Club in England, and was won by the American team. This first match was not actually played for the Curtis Cup, since the LGU initially declined to accept the cup for the contest. André Vagliano, a French golfer and official, had offered the LGU a trophy for the match between France and Britain. The LGU had declined that offer and thus felt unable to accept the offer of the Curtis Cup. It was not until November 1932 that the LGU changed their minds and accepted both trophies. Even though the Curtis Cup was not actually played for in 1932, this match is accepted as the first match in the series.

In 2004, then fourteen-year-old Michelle Wie played for the U.S. becoming the youngest player in Curtis Cup history. She won both of her singles matches. In 2010 Leona Maguire became the youngest player to represent Great Britain & Ireland when she played at the age of 15. In 2008 Stacy Lewis won all her five matches, a feat equalled by Bronte Law in 2016, Kristen Gillman in 2018, and Farah O'Keefe in 2026. The scheduled 2020 event was postponed to 2021 due to the COVID-19 pandemic.

== Format ==
The competition involves various match play matches between players selected from the two teams of 8, either singles, foursomes, or (starting in 2008) fourball. The winner of each match scores a point for their team, with 1/2 a point each for any match that is tied after 18 holes. If the entire Match is tied, the previously current holder retains the Cup.

A foursomes match is a competition between two teams of two golfers. The golfers on the same team take alternate shots throughout the match, with the same ball. Each hole is won by the team that completes the hole in the fewest shots. A fourball match is a competition between two teams of two golfers. All four golfers play with their own ball throughout the round. Each hole is won by the team whose individual golfer had the lowest score. A singles match is a standard match play competition between two golfers.

The original format was to have three foursomes matches and six singles matches for a total of nine points. In 1932 and 1936 these were played in a single day but generally they were played over two days. The early matches were played over 18 holes but from 1950 matches were over 36 holes. In 1964, the format was changed, with three foursomes and six singles matches each day, a total of 18 points. In 2008, the format changed to a three-day competition, with three foursomes and three fourball matches on each of the first two days, and eight singles matches on the final day, a total of 20 points. All matches since 1964 have been over 18 holes.

== Results ==
Year	Winning team	Score		Losing team	Captains	Venue
2026	United States	13	7	(United Kingdom) Great Britain & (Republic of Ireland) Ireland	(United States) Meghan Stasi (Scotland) Catriona Matthew	Bel-Air Country Club (Los Angeles, California)
2024	(United Kingdom) Great Britain & (Republic of Ireland) Ireland	10 1/2	9 1/2	United States	(United States) Meghan Stasi (Scotland) Catriona Matthew	Sunningdale Golf Club (Sunningdale, Berkshire, England)
2022	United States	15 1/2	4 1/2	(United Kingdom) Great Britain & (Republic of Ireland) Ireland	(United States) Sarah LeBrun Ingram (England) Elaine Ratcliffe	Merion Golf Club (Ardmore, Pennsylvania)
2021	United States	12 1/2	7 1/2	(United Kingdom) Great Britain & (Republic of Ireland) Ireland	(United States) Sarah LeBrun Ingram (England) Elaine Ratcliffe	Conwy Golf Club (Conwy, Wales)
2018	United States	17	3	(United Kingdom) Great Britain & (Republic of Ireland) Ireland	(United States) Virginia Derby Grimes (Scotland) Elaine Farquharson-Black	Quaker Ridge Golf Club (Scarsdale, New York)
2016	(United Kingdom) Great Britain & (Republic of Ireland) Ireland	11 1/2	8 1/2	United States	(United States) Robin Burke (Scotland) Elaine Farquharson-Black	Dun Laoghaire Golf Club (Enniskerry, Ireland)
2014	United States	13	7	(United Kingdom) Great Britain & (Republic of Ireland) Ireland	(United States) Ellen Port (Wales) Tegwen Matthews	St. Louis Country Club (Ladue, Missouri)
2012	(United Kingdom) Great Britain & (Republic of Ireland) Ireland	10 1/2	9 1/2	United States	(United States) Pat Cornett (Wales) Tegwen Matthews	Nairn Golf Club (Nairn, Scotland)
2010	United States	12 1/2	7 1/2	(United Kingdom) Great Britain & (Republic of Ireland) Ireland	(United States) Noreen Mohler (Republic of Ireland) Mary McKenna	Essex County Club (Manchester, Massachusetts)
2008	United States	13	7	(United Kingdom) Great Britain & (Republic of Ireland) Ireland	(United States) Carol Semple Thompson (Republic of Ireland) Mary McKenna	St Andrews Links (St Andrews, Fife, Scotland)
2006	United States	11 1/2	6 1/2	(United Kingdom) Great Britain & (Republic of Ireland) Ireland	(United States) Carol Semple Thompson (Republic of Ireland) Ada O'Sullivan	Bandon Dunes Golf Resort (Bandon, Oregon)
2004	United States	10	8	(United Kingdom) Great Britain & (Republic of Ireland) Ireland	(United States) Martha Kirouac (Republic of Ireland) Ada O'Sullivan	Formby Golf Club (Merseyside, England)
2002	United States	11	7	(United Kingdom) Great Britain & (Republic of Ireland) Ireland	(United States) Mary Budke (England) Pam Benka	Fox Chapel Golf Club (Pittsburgh, Pennsylvania)
2000	United States	10	8	(United Kingdom) Great Britain & (Republic of Ireland) Ireland	(United States) Jane Bastanchury Booth (Republic of Ireland) Claire Dowling	Ganton Golf Club (Ganton, England)
1998	United States	10	8	(United Kingdom) Great Britain & (Republic of Ireland) Ireland	(United States) Barbara McIntire (Republic of Ireland) Ita Butler	The Minikahda Club (Minneapolis, Minnesota)
1996	(United Kingdom) Great Britain & (Republic of Ireland) Ireland	11 1/2	6 1/2	United States	(United States) Martha Lang (Republic of Ireland) Ita Butler	Killarney Golf & Fishing Club (Killarney, Ireland)
1994	(United Kingdom) Great Britain & (Republic of Ireland) Ireland	9	9	United States	(United States) Lancy Smith (England) Elizabeth Boatman	Honors Course (Chattanooga, Tennessee)
1992	(United Kingdom) Great Britain & (Republic of Ireland) Ireland	10	8	United States	(United States) Judy Oliver (England) Elizabeth Boatman	Royal Liverpool Golf Club (Hoylake, England)
1990	United States	14	4	(United Kingdom) Great Britain & (Republic of Ireland) Ireland	(United States) Leslie Shannon (England) Jill Thornhill	Somerset Hills Country Club (Bernardsville, New Jersey)
1988	(United Kingdom) Great Britain & (Republic of Ireland) Ireland	11	7	United States	(United States) Judy Bell (England) Diane Bailey	Royal St George's Golf Club (Sandwich, Kent, England)
1986	(United Kingdom) Great Britain & (Republic of Ireland) Ireland	13	5	United States	(United States) Judy Bell (England) Diane Bailey	Prairie Dunes Country Club (Hutchinson, Kansas)
1984	United States	9 1/2	8 1/2	(United Kingdom) Great Britain & (Republic of Ireland) Ireland	(United States) Phyllis Preuss (England) Diane Bailey	Muirfield (Scotland)
1982	United States	14 1/2	3 1/2	(United Kingdom) Great Britain & (Republic of Ireland) Ireland	(United States) Betty Probasco (Republic of Ireland) Maire O'Donnell	Denver Country Club (Denver, Colorado)
1980	United States	13	5	(United Kingdom) Great Britain & (Republic of Ireland) Ireland	(United States) Nancy Roth Syms (England) Carol Comboy	St Pierre Golf & Country Club (Chepstow, Wales)
1978	United States	12	6	(United Kingdom) Great Britain & (Republic of Ireland) Ireland	(United States) Helen Sigel Wilson (England) Carol Comboy	Apawamis Club (Rye, New York)
1976	United States	11 1/2	6 1/2	(United Kingdom) Great Britain & (Republic of Ireland) Ireland	(United States) Barbara McIntire (Scotland) Belle Robertson	Royal Lytham & St Annes Golf Club (Lytham St Annes, Lancashire, England)
1974	United States	13	5	(United Kingdom) Great Britain & (Republic of Ireland) Ireland	(United States) Sis Choate (Scotland) Belle Robertson	San Francisco Golf Club (San Francisco, California)
1972	United States	10	8	(United Kingdom) Great Britain & (Republic of Ireland) Ireland	(United States) Jean Ashley Crawford (England) Frances Smith	Western Gailes Golf Club (Ayrshire, Scotland)
1970	United States	11 1/2	6 1/2	(United Kingdom) Great Britain & (Republic of Ireland) Ireland	(United States) Carolyn Cudone (England) Jeanne Bisgood	Brae Burn Country Club (Newton, Massachusetts)
1968	United States	10 1/2	7 1/2	(United Kingdom) Great Britain & (Republic of Ireland) Ireland	(United States) Evelynn Monsted (Northern Ireland) Zara Bolton	Royal County Down Golf Club (Newcastle, Northern Ireland)
1966	United States	13	5	(United Kingdom) Great Britain & (Republic of Ireland) Ireland	(United States) Dorothy Germain Porter (Northern Ireland) Zara Bolton	The Homestead (Hot Springs, Virginia)
1964	United States	10 1/2	7 1/2	(United Kingdom) Great Britain & (Republic of Ireland) Ireland	(United States) Helen Hawes (England) Elsie Corlett	Royal Porthcawl Golf Club (Porthcawl, South Wales)
1962	United States	8	1	(United Kingdom) Great Britain & (Republic of Ireland) Ireland	(United States) Polly Riley (England) Frances Smith	Broadmoor Golf Club (Colorado Springs, Colorado)
1960	United States	6 1/2	2 1/2	(United Kingdom) Great Britain & (Republic of Ireland) Ireland	(United States) Mildred Prunaret (England) Maureen Garrett	Lindrick Golf Club (Worksop, Nottinghamshire, England)
1958	(United Kingdom) Great Britain & (Republic of Ireland) Ireland	4 1/2	4 1/2	United States	(United States) Virginia Dennehy (Northern Ireland) Daisy Ferguson	Brae Burn Country Club (Newton, Massachusetts)
1956	(United Kingdom) Great Britain & (Republic of Ireland) Ireland	5	4	United States	(United States) Edith Flippin (Northern Ireland) Zara Bolton	Prince's Golf Club (Sandwich, Kent, England)
1954	United States	6	3	(United Kingdom) Great Britain & (Republic of Ireland) Ireland	(United States) Edith Flippin (Republic of Ireland) Dorothy Beck	Merion Golf Club (Ardmore, Pennsylvania)
1952	(United Kingdom) Great Britain & (Republic of Ireland) Ireland	5	4	United States	(United States) Aniela Goldthwaite (England) Katharine Cairns	Muirfield (Scotland)
1950	United States	7 1/2	1 1/2	(United Kingdom) Great Britain & (Republic of Ireland) Ireland	(United States) Glenna Collett Vare (England) Diana Critchley	Country Club of Buffalo (Williamsville, New York)
1948	United States	6 1/2	2 1/2	(United Kingdom) Great Britain & (Republic of Ireland) Ireland	(United States) Glenna Collett Vare (England) Doris Chambers	Royal Birkdale Golf Club (Southport, England)
1940–1946: Not played due to World War II						
1938	United States	5 1/2	3 1/2	(United Kingdom) Great Britain & (Republic of Ireland) Ireland	(United States) Frances Stebbins (Scotland) Margaret Wallace-Williamson	Essex County Club (Manchester, Massachusetts)
1936	United States	4 1/2	4 1/2	(United Kingdom) Great Britain & (Republic of Ireland) Ireland	(United States) Glenna Collett Vare (England) Doris Chambers	King's Course (Gleneagles, Scotland)
1934	United States	6 1/2	2 1/2	(United Kingdom) Great Britain & (Republic of Ireland) Ireland	(United States) Glenna Collett Vare (England) Doris Chambers	Chevy Chase Club (Chevy Chase, Maryland)
1932	United States	5 1/2	3 1/2	(United Kingdom) Great Britain & (Republic of Ireland) Ireland	(United States) Marion Hollins (England) Joyce Wethered	Wentworth Club (Wentworth, England)

Of the 43 contests through 2024, USA have won 31 matches, Great Britain and Ireland have won 9 with 3 matches tied (1936, 1958 and 1994).

== Future sites ==
- 2028 – Royal Dornoch Golf Club, Dornoch, Sutherland, Scotland
- 2030 – National Golf Links of America, Southampton, New York
- 2034 – Pine Valley Golf Club, Pine Valley, New Jersey
- 2038 – Bandon Dunes Golf Resort, Bandon, Oregon
- 2042 – Cypress Point Club (Pebble Beach, California)
- 2046 – Seminole Golf Club (Juno Beach, Florida)

== See also ==
- List of American Curtis Cup golfers
- List of Great Britain and Ireland Curtis Cup golfers
