= Fiona Brown (golfer) =

English amateur golfer (born 1974)

Personal information
- Full name: Fiona Mary Haddon Brown
- Nationality: England
- Born: 13 February 1974 (age 52) Cheshire, England

Career
- Sport: Golf
- Status: Amateur

Fiona Mary Haddon Brown (later Champness; born 13 February 1974) is an English amateur golfer. She won the 1994 English Women's Open Amateur Stroke Play Championship and the 1999 English Women's Amateur Championship. She played in the Curtis Cup in 1998 and 2000.

== Golf career ==
Born 13 February 1974, Brown won the English girls championship at Coventry in 1992, beating Lorna Nicholson 2&1 in the final. She played for England in the Girls Home Internationals in 1991 and 1992.

In 1994, Brown, aged 20, won the English Women's Open Amateur Stroke Play Championship at Ferndown, four strokes ahead of Kate Egford and Simone Morgan. In 1995, she won the Welsh Women's Open Stroke Play Championship at Newport, beating Alison Rose in a playoff. She was a runner-up in the event the following year, 1996, a stroke behind Emma Duggleby. In 1997, she was runner-up in the Helen Holm Scottish Women's Open Championship, losing in a playoff to Kim Rostron.

Playing with Elaine Ratcliffe, Brown won the 1998 Women's International Four Ball at the Orangebrook Golf and Country Club in Florida. She also won the 1998 Spanish Amateur Championship, beating Martina Eber in the final. She reached the semi-finals of the Ladies' British Open Amateur Championship, losing to Kim Rostron. Brown was selected for the Curtis Cup match in Minneapolis in August. The Americans regained the cup by 10 matches to 8. Brown lost her match in the opening day foursomes and was not selected for the singles. She won both her matches on the final day, winning her foursomes match, where she played with Rebecca Hudson, and beating JoJo Robertson in the singles.

Brown won the English Women's Amateur Championship at Ganton in May 1999, beating Kerry Smith 2&1 in the final. The following month she again reached the semi-finals of the Ladies' British Open Amateur Championship, losing this time to Rebecca Hudson. Later in the year she played for Great Britain & Ireland in the Vagliano Trophy, and for Great Britain in the Commonwealth Trophy in Canada.

Brown make her second Curtis Cup appearance in 2000 at Ganton. The Americans won the cup by the same score as in 1998, 10 matches to 8. Brown was only selected for one session, the first day singles which she lost narrowly to Robin Weiss. In 2001 Brown won the Helen Holm Scottish Women's Open Championship by two strokes from Rebecca Hudson. She also played for Great Britain & Ireland in the Vagliano Trophy match in Italy.

== Team appearances ==
- Curtis Cup (representing Great Britain & Ireland): 1998, 2000
- Vagliano Trophy (representing Great Britain & Ireland): 1999, 2001
- Commonwealth Trophy (representing Great Britain): 1999
- European Ladies' Team Championship (representing England): 1997, 1999
- Women's Home Internationals (representing England): 1994 (winners), 1996 (winners), 1997 (winners), 1998 (winners), 1999, 2000 (winners), 2001 (winners)
- Girls Home Internationals (representing England): 1991 (winners), 1992
