= Welsh Women's Open Stroke Play Championship =

Tournament information
- Location: Wales
- Established: 1976
- Organised by: Wales Golf
- Format: Stroke play

Current champion
- Nellie Ong

The Welsh Women's Open Stroke Play Championship is the women's national amateur stroke play golf championship of Wales. It was first played in 1976 and is currently organised by Wales Golf.

== Winners ==
Year	Winner	Score	Margin of victory	Runner(s)-up	Venue(s)	Ref.
2024	(England) Nellie Ong	211	4 strokes	(Northern Ireland) Jessica Ross	Pyle & Kenfig	
2023	(Scotland) Lorna McClymont	208	2 strokes	(Scotland) Jennifer Saxton	Prestatyn	
2022	(England) Alice Barlow	217	4 strokes	(Scotland) Chloe Goadby (Australia) Abbie Teasdale	Southerndown	
2021	(England) Lottie Woad	213	3 strokes	(England) Billie-Jo Smith	Newport	
2020	Cancelled due to the COVID-19 pandemic in Wales				Royal Porthcawl	
2019	(England) Lily May Humphreys	209	4 strokes	(England) Isobel Wardle	Royal St David's	
2018	(Scotland) Hannah McCook	212	Playoff (Note: McCook won at the first hole of a sudden-death playoff.)	(England) Sophie Lamb	Aberdovey	
2017	(England) Gemma Clews	219	5 strokes	(England) Lianna Bailey	Kirby Muxloe	
2016	(Northern Ireland) Olivia Mehaffey	220	5 strokes	(Northern Ireland) Jessica Ross	Conwy	
2015	(Northern Ireland) Olivia Mehaffey	221	1 stroke	(England) Olivia Winning	Southerndown	
2014	(Scotland) Eilidh Briggs	216	1 stroke	(England) Annabel Dimmock	Prestatyn	
2013	(Wales) Amy Boulden	224	4 strokes	(England) Alexandra Peters	The Vale Resort	
2012	(Wales) Becky Harries	220	2 strokes	(Wales) Chole Williams	Ashburnham	
2011	(England) Charley Hull	225	1 stroke	(Wales) Lucy Gould	Tenby	
2010	(South Korea) Julie Yang	216	Playoff (Note: Yang won with a par at the first hole of a sudden-death playoff.)	(England) Nikki Foster	Southerndown	
2009	(Northern Ireland) Danielle McVeigh	223	1 stroke	(England) Rachel Jennings	Royal Porthcawl	
2008	(Wales) Rhian Wyn Thomas	228	4 strokes	(England) Hannah Barwood (Republic of Ireland) Niamh Kitching	Pyle & Kenfig	
2007	(Scotland) Heather MacRae	219	3 strokes	(Australia) Bronwyn Mullins-Lane	Newport	
2006	(England) Naomi Edwards	221	1 stroke	(England) Felicity Johnson	Whitchurch (Cardiff)	
2005	(England) Henrietta Brockway	218	Playoff (Note: Brockway won at the third hole of a sudden-death playoff.)	(England) Kiran Matharu	Pyle & Kenfig	
2004	(England) Danielle Masters	216	2 strokes	(Wales) Anna Highgate	Ashburnham	
2003	(Scotland) Vikki Laing	213	2 strokes	(Wales) Becky Brewerton	Southerndown	
2002	(Scotland) Vikki Laing	218	1 stroke	(Scotland) Heather Stirling	Northop Country Park	
2001	(Scotland) Vikki Laing	229	3 strokes	(England) Stephanie Coverley (Wales) Anna Highgate (England) Fame More (England) Alison Waller	Royal Porthcawl	
2000	(England) Rebecca Prout	228	2 strokes	(Australia) Melanie Holmes-Smith	Ashburnham	
1999	(Scotland) Anne Walker	230	2 strokes	(Wales) Eleanor Pilgrim	Celtic Manor	
1998	(England) Georgina Simpson	150 (Note: Event reduced to 36 holes because of rain.)	2 strokes	(England) Chloe Court	Rolls of Monmouth	
1997	(England) Kelly Edwards	216	5 strokes	(Netherlands) Marieke Zelsmann	Whitchurch (Cardiff)	
1996	(England) Emma Duggleby	223	1 stroke	(England) Fiona Brown (Wales) Becky Morgan	Whitchurch (Cardiff)	
1995	(England) Fiona Brown	221	Playoff (Note: Brown won at the first hole of a sudden-death playoff.)	(Scotland) Alison Rose	Newport	
1994	(Scotland) Alison Rose	217	1 stroke	(England) Emma Fields	Newport	
1993	(England) Julie Hall	221	Playoff (Note: Hall won at the third hole of a sudden-death playoff.)	(England) Nicola Buxton	Newport	
1992	(Scotland) Catriona Lambert	218	5 strokes	(England) Caroline Hall (England) Joanne Morley	Royal Porthcawl	
1991	(England) Mandy Sutton	224	4 strokes	(England) Joanne Morley	Royal Porthcawl	
1990	(England) Lisa Hackney	218	5 strokes	(England) Helen Dobson	Newport	
1989	(Wales) Vicki Thomas	220	8 strokes	(England) Sarah Bennett (England) Katie Tebbet	Newport	
1988	(England) Susan Shapcott	218	1 stroke	(England) Katie Tebbet	Newport	
1987	(England) Susan Shapcott	225	Playoff (Note: Shapcott won at the second hole of a sudden-death playoff.)	(England) Sara Robinson (Wales) Vicki Thomas	Newport	
1986	(Wales) Helen Wadsworth	223	2 strokes	(England) Katherine Harridge (England) Sue Moorcroft	Aberdovey	
1985	(England) Carol Swallow	219	5 strokes	(Wales) Mandy Rawlings	Aberdovey	
1984	(England) Laura Davies	230	2 strokes	(Wales) Vicki Thomas	Aberdovey	
1983	(England) Jill Thornhill	239	1 stroke	(Wales) Vicki Thomas	Aberdovey	
1982	(Wales) Vicki Thomas	224	5 strokes	(England) Claire Waite	Aberdovey	
1981	(Wales) Vicki Thomas	224	6 strokes	(Wales) Tegwen Thomas	Aberdovey	
1980	(Wales) Tegwen Thomas	233	1 stroke	(Wales) Vicki Thomas	Aberdovey	
1979	(England) Sue Crowcroft	228	3 strokes	(England) Beverley New	Aberdovey	
1978	(England) Sue Hedges	208 (Note: Event reduced to 49 holes because of fog.)	1 stroke	(England) Sue Westall	Aberdovey	
1977	(England) Julia Greenhalgh	239	3 strokes	(Wales) Tegwen Perkins	Aberdovey	
1976	(Wales) Pamela Light	227	5 strokes	(Wales) Tegwen Perkins	Aberdovey	
