= Elaine Ratcliffe =

English amateur golfer

Personal information
- Nationality: England
- Born: November 1972 (age 53–54) Crewe, England

Career
- Sport: Golf
- Status: Amateur

Elaine Ratcliffe (born November 1972) is an English amateur golfer. She won the 1998 English Women's Amateur Championship. She played in the Curtis Cup in 1996 and 1998 and was the non-playing captain in 2021 and 2022.

== Golf career ==
In 1990 Ratcliffe represented England in the Girls Home Internationals at Penrith. The following year she had two rounds of 72 in the Ladies' British Open Amateur Stroke Play Championship at Long Ashton, to lead after 36 holes, but fell away badly on the final day. From 1991 to 1995 she attended the University of Stirling, having obtained a golf scholarship there. In 1995, having obtained her degree, she won the English Ladies' Golf Association's Silver Tee award for successfully combining golf with education.

Ratcliffe first came to prominence in 1995. She won the Cheshire championship and then reached the final of the English Women's Amateur Championship at Ipswich, losing 2&1 to Julie Hall. She was runner-up to Maria José Pons in the Ladies' British Open Amateur Stroke Play Championship at Prince's and was joint third in the European Ladies Amateur Championship in Berlin, five strokes behind Maria Hjorth despite an opening round of 78 which left her nine strokes off the lead. She also made her senior debut for England in the European Ladies' Team Championship in Milan and in the Women's Home Internationals in Wrexham where she won all her five matches.

In April 1996 Ratcliffe was selected for the Curtis Cup match, played in June in Killarney. She was not selected for either foursomes session but she halved her singles match against Marla Jemsek on the opening day and beat Sarah LeBrun Ingram on the final day. In July she reached the semi-finals of the Ladies' British Open Amateur Championship, losing to Becky Morgan. She continued to have good results in stroke-play events, finishing a joint runner-up behind Sarah Gallagher in the English Women's Open Amateur Stroke Play Championship and runner-up to Christina Kuld in the Ladies' British Open Amateur Stroke Play Championship. She also represented Great Britain & Ireland in the Espirito Santo Trophy in the Philippines.

In 1997 Ratcliffe was runner-up in the Ladies' British Open Amateur Stroke Play Championship for the third successive year, behind Karen Margrethe Juul. She represented England in the European Ladies' Team Championship in Finland and won the Finnish title. She also represented Great Britain & Ireland in the Vagliano Trophy match in Sweden.

Playing with Fiona Brown, Ratcliffe won the 1998 Women's International Four Ball at the Orangebrook Golf and Country Club in Florida. In May she won the English Women's Amateur Championship at Walton Heath beating Liza Walters at the 19th hole in the final. Walters was two holes ahead with three to play but Ratcliffe won the 16th and 18th and then the first extra hole with a par 3. Two weeks later she was selected for the Curtis Cup match in Minneapolis in August. The Americans regained the cup by 10 matches to 8. Ratcliffe was selected for all four sessions, playing with Kim Rostron in the foursomes. She won both her matches on the opening day, beating Carol Semple Thompson in the singles. On the final day she lost in the foursomes and halved her singles match against Virginia Grimes, to remain unbeaten in her four Curtis Cup singles matches.

Ratcliffe turned professional after the 1998 Curtis Cup. She played on the Ladies European Tour in 1999 and was the Rookie of the Year, finishing 66th on the money list with £12,145. Her best finish was in the Ladies Hannover Expo 2000 Open where she finished fifth, winning £4,240. Ratcliffe later had back problems and 1999 was to be her best season. She left the tour after the 2002 season. She was reinstated as an amateur in 2008.

She was the non-playing captain of the Curtis Cup team in 2021 and 2022.

== Team appearances ==
- Curtis Cup (representing Great Britain & Ireland): 1996 (winners), 1998, 2021 (non-playing captain), 2022 (non-playing captain)
- Vagliano Trophy (representing Great Britain & Ireland): 1997
- Espirito Santo Trophy (representing Great Britain & Ireland): 1996
- European Ladies' Team Championship (representing England): 1995, 1997
- Women's Home Internationals (representing England): 1995 (winners), 1996 (winners), 1997 (winners)
- Girls Home Internationals (representing England): 1990 (winners)
