= Kim Andrew (golfer) =

English amateur golfer

Personal information
- Nationality: England
- Born: 12 February 1974 (age 52) Lancashire, England

Career
- Sport: Golf
- Status: Amateur

Kim Andrew (née Rostron; born 12 February 1974) is an English amateur golfer. She won the 1997 English Women's Amateur Championship and the 1998 Ladies' British Open Amateur Championship. She played in the Curtis Cup in 1998 and 2000.

== Golf career ==
Andrew played for England in the Girls Home Internationals in 1991 and 1992. However she failed to make an impact in important national events until 1997, although she made her debut for England in the Women's Home Internationals in 1996.

In April 1997 she won the Helen Holm Scottish Women's Open Championship beating Fiona Brown after a sudden-death playoff. The following month she won the English Women's Amateur Championship at Saunton, beating Kate Burton 4&2 in the final, and the following week won the St Rule Trophy by a stroke from Janice Moodie. In July she made her debut for Great Britain & Ireland in the Vagliano Trophy match in Sweden.

In 1998 Andrew won the Ladies' British Open Amateur Championship at Little Aston, beating Gwladys Nocera 3&2 in the final. She was selected for the Curtis Cup match in Minneapolis in August. The Americans regained the cup by 10 matches to 8. Andrew played with Elaine Ratcliffe in the foursomes, winning on the first day but losing on the final day. She played Kellee Booth in both sets of singles matches, losing both times. She was chosen as the 1998 Daily Telegraph woman golf of the year.

In May 1999, Andrew reached the semi-finals of the English Women's Amateur Championship at Ganton, and she was also a runner-up in the St Rule Trophy. The following month she again reached the semi-finals of the Ladies' British Open Amateur Championship, losing by one hole to Marine Monnet. Later in the year she played for Great Britain & Ireland in the Vagliano Trophy, and for Great Britain in the Commonwealth Trophy in Canada.

Andrew make her second Curtis Cup appearance in 2000 at Ganton. The Americans won the cup by the same score as in 1998, 10 matches to 8. She played with Becky Morgan in both foursomes sessions but lost both times. In the singles she lost to Beth Bauer but beat Virginia Derby Grimes on the final day. In 2001 Andrew played for Great Britain & Ireland .in the Vagliano Trophy match in Italy, and also made her final appearances for England in the European Ladies' Team Championship and the Women's Home Internationals.

== Personal life ==
She married Robert Andrew in late 1998.

== Team appearances ==
- Curtis Cup (representing Great Britain & Ireland): 1998, 2000
- Vagliano Trophy (representing Great Britain & Ireland): 1997, 1999, 2001
- Commonwealth Trophy (representing Great Britain): 1999
- European Ladies' Team Championship (representing England): 1997, 1999, 2001
- Women's Home Internationals (representing England): 1996 (winners), 1997 (winners), 1998 (winners), 1999, 2001 (winners)
- Girls Home Internationals (representing England): 1991 (winners), 1992
