= Fiona Brown =

Fiona Brown may refer to:

- Fiona Brown (bridge) (born 1985), Bridge player
- Fiona Brown (footballer) (born 1995), Scottish footballer
- Fiona Brown (golfer) (born 1974), English amateur golfer
- Fiona MacDonald, née Brown (born 1974), Scottish curler
- Fiz Brown, a fictional character in the television soap opera Coronation Street
