= Sophie Walker (golfer) =

English professional golfer (born 1984)

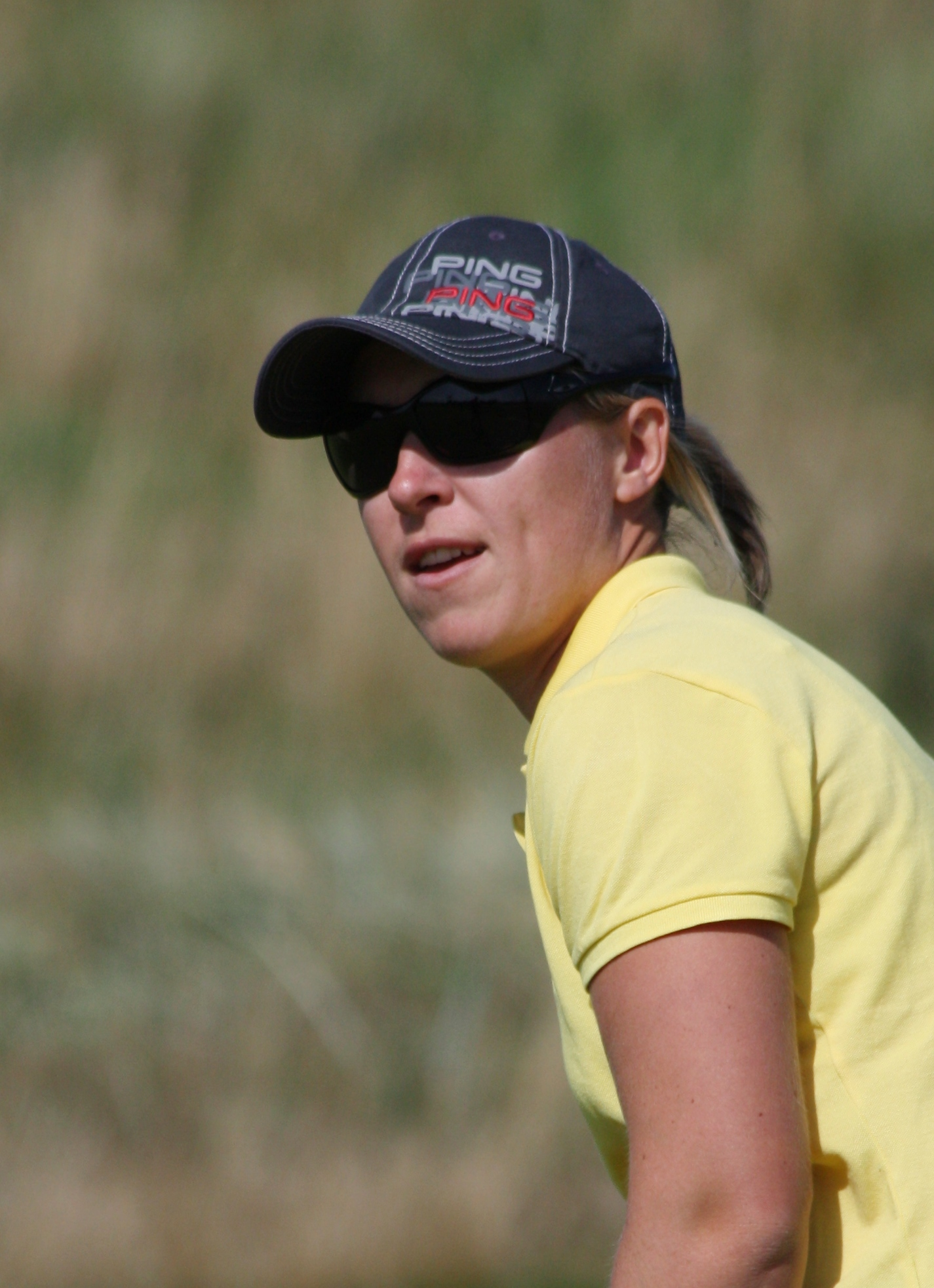
- Walker in 2009

Personal information
- Nationality: England
- Born: 9 August 1984 (age 42) Grimsby, Lincolnshire, England
- Height: 5 ft 4 in (163 cm)

Career
- Sport: Golf
- College: Loughborough University
- Turned professional: 2006
- Former tour: Ladies European Tour (2007–2018)

Best results in LPGA major championships
- Chevron Championship: DNP
- Women's PGA C'ship: DNP
- U.S. Women's Open: CUT: 2018
- Women's British Open: CUT: 2007, 2009, 2014
- Evian Championship: DNP

Sophie Walker (born 9 August 1984) is an English professional golfer and broadcaster. She played on the Ladies European Tour 2007–2018 and was runner-up at the 2010 Women's Scottish Open.

== Amateur career ==
Walker started playing golf at the age of 10 and represented England from 2000 to 2006, and Great Britain & Ireland from 2004 to 2006.

She reached the semi-finals of the British Ladies Amateur in 2004. She won the 2003 English Women's Open Amateur Stroke Play Championship and lost the final of the 2005 English Women's Amateur Championship to Felicity Johnson.

Walker graduated from Loughborough University with a degree in Sports Science and Business Management. and was joint leader with Becky Brewerton at the 2006 Wales Ladies Championship of Europe after a first round of 65, a seven under par.

== Professional career ==
Walker finished 6th at LET Q-School to join the Ladies European Tour in 2007. In her rookie season, she recorded several top-10 finishes including at the Women's Scottish Open. In 2010 she was runner-up at the same event, one stroke behind Virginie Lagoutte-Clement. Other highlights included a tie for 3rd at the 2016 Andalucia Costa Del Sol Open De España.

After retiring from tour in 2018, she started a career in broadcasting, serving as a golf analyst for Sky Sports, BBC and other outlets.

== Amateur wins ==
- 2000 Daily Telegraph Junior Golf Championship
- 2001 Daily Telegraph Junior Golf Championship
- 2003 English Women's Open Amateur Stroke Play Championship

== Results in LPGA majors ==
Tournament	2007	2008	2009	2010	2011	2012	2013	2014	2015	2016	2017	2018
U.S. Women's Open												CUT
Women's British Open	CUT		CUT					CUT				

Did not play

CUT = missed the half-way cut

== Team appearances ==
Amateur

- Women's Home Internationals (representing England): 2003, 2004, 2005 (winners), 2006 (winners)
- European Lady Junior's Team Championship (representing England): 2004
- Vagliano Trophy (representing Great Britain & Ireland): 2005
- Spirit International (representing England): 2005 (winners)
- European Ladies' Team Championship (representing England): 2005
- Espirito Santo Trophy (representing England): 2006
