= Alison Rose (golfer) =

Scottish amateur golfer

Personal information
- Full name: Alison Jane Rose
- Nationality: Scotland
- Born: 18 June 1968 (age 58) Scotland

Career
- Sport: Golf
- Status: Amateur

Alison Jane Rose (later Davidson, born 18 June 1968) is a Scottish amateur golfer. She won the 1997 Ladies' British Open Amateur Championship and played in the Curtis Cup in 1996 and 1998.

== Golf career ==
Rose represented Scotland in the 1988 European Lady Junior's Team Championship in Belgium, an under-21 event, where the team were runners-up, losing 6 matches to 1 in the final against to England. Rose won the only Scottish point in the final. She first played for Scotland in the Women's Home Internationals in 1990 and in the European Ladies' Team Championship in 1991. She had some successes in the early 1990s, winning the St Rule Trophy at St Andrews in 1991 and leading the stroke-play qualifying at the 1992 Ladies' British Open Amateur Championship at Saunton.

In 1994 she won the Welsh Women's Open Stroke Play Championship, a stroke ahead of Emma Fields, and was a runner-up in the St Rule Trophy. The following year she was runner-up in the same two events. She lost to Fiona Brown in a playoff for the Welsh championship and was again a runner-up in the St Rule Trophy. 1995 also saw her selected for British teams for the first time, playing for Great Britain & Ireland in the Vagliano Trophy at Ganton in July and for Great Britain in the Commonwealth Trophy in Australia in September.

In April 1996 Rose was selected for the Curtis Cup match, played in June in Killarney. Great Britain & Ireland won the match by five points to retain the trophy. Rose was the most successful player, winning all her four matches. She played with Lisa Dermott in both foursomes sessions. In the singles, she beat Ellen Port 6 and 5 on the opening day and Brenda Corrie-Kuehn 5 and 4 on the final day. In May she had lost narrowly to Anne Laing in the final of the Scottish Women's Amateur Championship at Royal Dornoch.

In May 1997, Rose beat Hilary Monaghan 3 and 2 in the final of the Scottish Women's Amateur Championship at West Kilbride. The following month she won the Ladies' British Open Amateur Championship at Cruden Bay, beating Mhairi McKay 4 and 3 in the final.

In June 1998 Rose was selected for the Curtis Cup match in Minneapolis in August. The Americans regained the cup by 10 matches to 8. Rose played with Becky Morgan in the foursomes, losing both matches. She played in the singles on the opening day, losing 3 and 2 to Brenda Corrie-Kuehn and was not selected for the final day's singles.

She made her final appearances for Scotland in the 1999 European Ladies' Team Championship in France, where the team finished a disappointing 13th, and in the Women's Home Internationals in 2000.

== Personal life ==
She married Martin Davidson in 1999.

== Team appearances ==
- Curtis Cup (representing Great Britain & Ireland): 1996 (winners), 1998
- Vagliano Trophy (representing Great Britain & Ireland): 1995, 1997
- Commonwealth Trophy (representing Great Britain): 1995
- European Ladies' Team Championship (representing Scotland): 1991, 1993, 1995, 1997, 1999
- Women's Home Internationals (representing Scotland): 1990 (winners), 1991 (winners), 1992, 1993, 1994, 1995, 1996, 1997, 1998, 2000
- European Lady Junior's Team Championship (representing Scotland): 1988
