= Helen Holm Scottish Women's Open Championship =

Scottish Women's Open Amateur Stroke Play Championship
Tournament information
- Location: Scotland
- Established: 1973
- Courses: Royal Troon (Portland and Old courses)
- Par: 75
- Organised by: Scottish Golf
- Format: Stroke play
- Month played: April

Current champion
- (England) Grace Bowen

The Helen Holm Scottish Women's Open Amateur Stroke Play Championship is the national women's amateur stroke play golf championship in Scotland (although entry is open to overseas golfers). It has been played annually at Royal Troon since 1973 and is organised by the Scottish Golf.

The format is 54-hole stroke play contested over three days. It is played at Royal Troon with the first two rounds played on the Portland course and the final round on the Old course. Originally it was played over two days, with 36 holes on the first day.

The tournament is named after Helen Holm, a Scottish amateur golfer who was Scottish champion five times.

== Winners ==
Year	Winner	Score	Margin of victory	Runner(s)-up	Ref.
2026	(England) Grace Bowen	211	2 strokes	(Ireland) Jessica Ross	
2025	(Ireland) Roisin Scanlon	212	5 strokes	(England) Jessica Hall	
2024	(England) Ellie Monk	218	2 strokes	(Republic of Ireland) Kate Lanigan (England) Nellie Ong	
2023	(Scotland) Jasmine Mackintosh	218	Playoff	(Scotland) Lorna McClymont	
2022	(Scotland) Grace Crawford	212	4 strokes	(England) Thalia Kirby	
2021	(Australia) Kirsten Rudgeley	204	1 stroke	(Scotland) Hannah Darling (England) Emily Toy	
2020	Cancelled due to COVID-19 pandemic in Scotland				
2019	(Slovenia) Pia Babnik	201	1 stroke	(France) Charlotte Bunel	
2018	(England) Lily May Humphreys	207	1 stroke	(Scotland) Chloe Goadby	
2017	(Sweden) Linn Grant	209	5 strokes	(Scotland) Shannon McWilliam	
2016	(England) Olivia Winning	217	1 stroke	(Northern Ireland) Olivia Mehaffey	
2015	(Northern Ireland) Olivia Mehaffey	220	1 stroke	(France) Anais Meyssonnier	
2014	(England) Annabel Dimmock	214	3 strokes	(Scotland) Connie Jaffrey	
2013	(England) Olivia Winning	220	2 strokes	(England) Poppy Finlay (Scotland) Alyson McKechin	
2012	(Wales) Amy Boulden	215	1 stroke	(France) Perrine Delacour	
2011	(England) Charlotte Ellis	213	1 stroke	(Republic of Ireland) Leona Maguire	
2010	(Republic of Ireland) Danielle McVeigh	215	2 strokes	(England) Nikki Foster	
2009	(Republic of Ireland) Leona Maguire	219	2 strokes	(Scotland) Kelsey MacDonald	
2008	(France) Barbara Genuini	214	2 strokes	(Sweden) Jacqueline Hedwall	
2007	(England) Melissa Reid	211	3 strokes	(England) Rachel Bell	
2006	(England) Melissa Reid	212	1 stroke	(England) Emma Duggleby	
2005	(Republic of Ireland) Martina Gillen	215	Playoff	(Scotland) Clare Queen	
2004	(England) Emma Duggleby	211	5 strokes	(Republic of Ireland) Claire Coughlan	
2003	(France) Nathalie David	227	2 strokes	(Wales) Becky Brewerton (England) Rachel Lomas (Scotland) Clare Queen	
2002	(Scotland) Heather Stirling	215	4 strokes	(Wales) Becky Brewerton	
2001	(England) Fiona Brown	215	2 strokes	(England) Rebecca Hudson	
2000	(England) Rebecca Hudson	213	Playoff	(England) Emma Duggleby	
1999	(Scotland) Lesley Nicholson	222	1 stroke	(Northern Ireland) Alison Coffey	
1998	(Denmark) Karen Margrethe Juul	225	2 strokes	(Northern Ireland) Alison Coffey	
1997	(England) Kim Rostron	219	Playoff	(England) Fiona Brown	
1996	(England) Joanne Hockley	219	8 strokes	(Scotland) Valerie Melvin	
1995	(Sweden) Maria Hjorth	219	1 stroke	(Sweden) Sara Eklund (England) Julie Hall	
1994	(England) Katie Tebbet	223	3 strokes	(Scotland) Myra McKinlay	
1993	(England) Julie Hall	224	2 strokes	(Scotland) Janice Moodie	
1992	(Scotland) Mhairi McKay	227	2 strokes	(England) Julie Hall	
1991	(England) Julie Hall	224	5 strokes	(England) Linzi Fletcher	
1990	(Scotland) Catriona Lambert	225	2 strokes	(England) Linzi Fletcher	
1989	(England) Sara Robinson	225	5 strokes	(England) Linzi Fletcher	
1988	(Scotland) Alison Gemmill	233	2 strokes	(Scotland) Donna Jackson (England) Katie Tebbet	
1987	(Scotland) Elaine Farquharson	227	1 stroke	(Sweden) Malin Landehag	
1986	(Scotland) Belle Robertson	227	3 strokes	(Scotland) Shirley Lawson	
1985	(Scotland) Pamela Wright	244	2 strokes	(Scotland) Belle Robertson	
1984	(Scotland) Gillian Stewart	217	9 strokes	(Wales) Vicki Thomas	
1983	(Scotland) Jane Connachan	228	1 stroke	(Scotland) Wilma Aitken	
1982	(Scotland) Wilma Aitken	231			
1981	(Scotland) Gillian Stewart	231	5 strokes	(Scotland) Vicki McAlister	
1980	(Scotland) Wilma Aitken	225	4 strokes	(Scotland) Gillian Stewart	
1979	(Scotland) Belle Robertson	234	6 strokes	(Scotland) Vicki McAlister (Scotland) Gillian Stewart	
1978	(Scotland) Wilma Aitken	230	6 strokes	(Sweden) Kärstin Ehrnlund	
1977	(England) Beverly Huke	239	3 strokes	(Scotland) Vicki McAlister (Scotland) Muriel Thomson	
1976	(Scotland) Muriel Thomson	233	4 strokes	(Republic of Ireland) Mary McKenna (Scotland) Sandra Needham	
1975	(Scotland) Muriel Thomson	235	1 stroke	(Scotland) Maureen Walker	
1974	(Scotland) Sandra Needham	236	7 strokes	(Scotland) Lorna Bennett	
1973	(Scotland) Belle Robertson	238	3 strokes	(England) Mary Everard	

== See also ==
- Scottish Amateur Stroke Play Championship – the equivalent championship for men
