= 2005 European Ladies' Team Championship =

Golf competition

Tournament information
- Dates: 5–9 July 2005
- Location: Karlstad, Sweden; 59°25′57″N 13°31′03″E
- Course: Karlstad Golf Club
- Organized by: European Golf Association
- Format: 36 holes stroke play Knock-out match-play

Statistics
- Par: 72
- Field: 15 teams 90 players

Champion
- Spain; Emma Cabrera-Bello, Tania Elósegui, María Hernández, Lucia Mar, Belén Mozo, Adriana Zwank
- Qualification round: 728 (+8); Final match 5–2

Location map
- Location in Europe Location in Sweden Location in Värmland County

The 2005 European Ladies' Team Championship took place 5–9 July at Karlstad Golf Club in Karlstad, Sweden. It was the 24th women's golf amateur European Ladies' Team Championship.

== Venue ==
The hosting Karlstad Golf Club was founded in 1957. The first nine holes of the course, situated 8 kilometres north of the city center of Karlstad, the largest city in the province Värmland in Sweden, was designed by Nils Skiöld and opened in 1959. The second nine holes opened in 1968. Another nine holes, designed by Sune Linde, was completed in 1989 and made it possible to combine two of the three different nine hole courses for an 18 hole round, with par 72 on all available combinations.

The club had previously hosted the individual European Amateur Championship for men in 1996 and the Swedish PGA Championship, for men as well as for women, in 1998.

== Format ==
All participating teams played two qualification rounds of stroke-play with six players, counted the five best scores for each team.

The eight best teams formed flight A, in knock-out match-play over the next three days. The teams were seeded based on their positions after the stroke-play. The first placed team was drawn to play the quarter-final against the eight placed team, the second against the seventh, the third against the sixth and the fourth against the fifth. In each match between two nation teams, two 18-hole foursome games and five 18-hole single games were played. Teams were allowed to switch players during the team matches, selecting other players in to the afternoon single games after the morning foursome games. Teams knocked out after the quarter-finals played one foursome game and four single games in each of their remaining matches. Games all square after 18 holes were declared halved, if the team match was already decided.

The seven teams placed 9–15 in the qualification stroke-play formed flight B, to play similar knock-out match-play, with one foursome game and four single games to decide their final positions.

== Teams ==
15 nation teams contested the event. Each team consisted of six players.

Players in the participating teams

Country	Players
Czech Republic	Silvie Dittertova, Petra Kvidova, Zuzana Mašínová, Edita Nechanicka, Katerina Ruzickova, Stanislava Samkova
Denmark	Line Cordes, Malene Jörgensen, Cathrine Orloff Madsen, Lisbeth Meincke, Karina Rosenmeier, Victoria Stefansen
England	Emma Duggleby, Felicity Johnson, Sian Reddick, Faye Sanderson, Kerry Smith, Sophie Walker
Finland	Satu Harju, Sohvi Härkönen, Kaisa Ruuttila, Anna-Karin Salmén, Hanna-Leena Salonen, Stenna Westerlund
France	Mélodie Bourdy, Anne Lise Caudal, Elena Giraud, Cassandra Kirkland, Jade Schaeffer, Alexandra Vilatte
Germany	Stephanie Döring, Sandra Gal, Thea Hoffmeister, Stephanie Kirchmayr, Carolin Loehr, Katharina Schallenberg
Iceland	Helena Arnadottir, Nina Björk Geirsdottir, Thordis Geirsdottir, Anna Lisa Johannsdottir, Tinna Johannsdottir, Elisabeth Olddsdottir
Ireland	Claire Coughlan, Tara Delaney, Martina Gillen, Tricia Mangan, Heather Nolan, Deirdre Smith
Italy	Federica Angioletti, Giulia Garbaccio, Giusy Paolillo, Anna Roscio, Anna Rossi, Vittoria Valvassori
Netherlands	Myrte Eikenaar, Christel Boeljon, Marjet van der Graaf, Joan van der Kraats, Dewi Claire Schreefel, Marie Louise Weeda
Scotland	Pamela Feggans, Anne Laing, Fiona Lockhart, Heather MacRae, Claire Queen, Jenna Wilson
Spain	Emma Cabrera-Bello, Tania Elósegui, María Hernández, Lucia Mar, Belén Mozo, Adriana Zwank
Sweden	Sofie Andersson, Pernilla Lindberg, Therese Nilsson, Maria Ohlsson, Karin Sjödin, Louise Stahle
Switzerland	Niloufar Aazam, Fabienne In-Albon, Sheila Lee, Caroline Rominger, Frédérique Seeholzer, Natalia Tanno
Wales	Natalee Evans, Stephanie Evans, Lydia Hall, Sarah Jones, Breanne Loucks, Jo Nicolson

== Winners ==
Team England lead the opening 36-hole qualifying competition, with a score of 7 over par 727, one stroke ahead of defending champions Spain on second place.

Individual leader in the 36-hole stroke-play competition was Sophie Walker, England, with a score of 8 under par 136, one stroke ahead of her English teammate Felicity Johnson.

Team Spain won the championship, beating England 5–2 in the final and earned their third title. The win came to be the second of three in a row for Spain. Team France earned third place, beating host nation Sweden 4–3 in the bronze match.

== Results ==
Qualification round

Team standings

Place	Country	Score	To par
1	England	361-366=727	+7
2	Spain	358-370=728	+8
3	Germany	373-370=743	+23
4	Sweden	377-368=745	+25
5	Ireland	381-370=751	+31
6	France	372-380=752	+32
7	Switzerland	370-383=753	+33
8	Finland	380-377=757	+37
9	Scotland	381-379=760	+40
10	Netherlands	384-379=763	+43
11	Italy	386-386=772	+52
12	Wales	386-391=777	+53
13	Denmark	394-395=789	+69
14	Czech Republic	395-398=793	+73
15	Iceland	424-397=821	+101

Individual leaders

Place	Player	Country	Score	To par
1	Sophie Walker	England	70-70=140	−4
2	Felicity Johnson	England	72-69=142	−3
T3	Emma Cabrera Bello	Spain	72-71=143	−1
T3	Pernilla Lindberg	Sweden	74-69=143	−1
5	Anne-Lise Caudal	France	71-73=144	E
T6	Sandra Gal	Germany	72-73=145	+1
T6	Fabienne In-Albon	Switzerland	69-76=145	+1
T6	Belén Mozo	Spain	72-73=145	+1
T9	Stephanie Kirchmayer	Germany	73-73=146	+2
T9	Katharina Schallenberg	Germany	71-75=146	+2
T9	Louise Stahle	Sweden	71-75=146	+2
T9	Adriana Zwank	Spain	75-71=146	+2

Note: There was no official award for the lowest individual score.

Flight A

Bracket

Quarter finals
Spain	5
Switzerland	2
France	4
Germany	3
Sweden	5
Ireland	2
England	6
Finland	1

Semi finals
Spain	4
France	3
England	5
Sweden	2

Final
Spain	5
England	2
Bronze match
France	4
Sweden	3

Elimination matches
Germany	3
Switzerland	2
Ireland	4.5
Finland	0.5

Match for 5th place
Germany	3
Ireland	2
Match for 7th place
Finland	4
Switzerland	1

Final games

Spain	England
5	2
B. Mozo / A. Zwank 19th hole	E. Duggleby / F. Johnson
T. Elósegui / M. Hernandez	S. Walker / K. Smith 5 & 4
Adriana Zwanck 5 & 4	Felicity Johnson
Belén Mozo 19th hole	Sophie Walker
Maria Hernandez 19th hole	Emma Duggleby
Emma Cabrera Bello	Faye Sanderson 3 & 2
Tania Elósegui 2 & 1	Kerry Smith

Flight B

Bracket

Round 1
Netherlands	5
Iceland	0
Italy	3.5
Czech Republic	1.5
Denmark	3
Wales	2

Round 2
Netherlands	3.5
Italy	1.5
Scotland	4.5
Denmark	0.5

Match for 9th place
Scotland	4
Netherlands	1
Match for 11th place
Italy	4
Denmark	3

Elimination match
Czech Republic	4
Iceland	1

Match for 13th place
Czech Republic	3.5
Wales	1.5

Final standings

Place	Country
1st place, gold medalist(s)	Spain
2nd place, silver medalist(s)	England
3rd place, bronze medalist(s)	France
4	Sweden
5	Germany
6	Ireland
7	Finland
8	Switzerland
9	Scotland
10	Netherlands
11	Italy
12	Denmark
13	Czech Republic
14	Wales
15	Iceland

== See also ==
- Espirito Santo Trophy – biennial world amateur team golf championship for women organized by the International Golf Federation.
- European Amateur Team Championship – European amateur team golf championship for men organised by the European Golf Association.
