= Abu Dhabi Junior Golf Championship =

International youth golf tournament

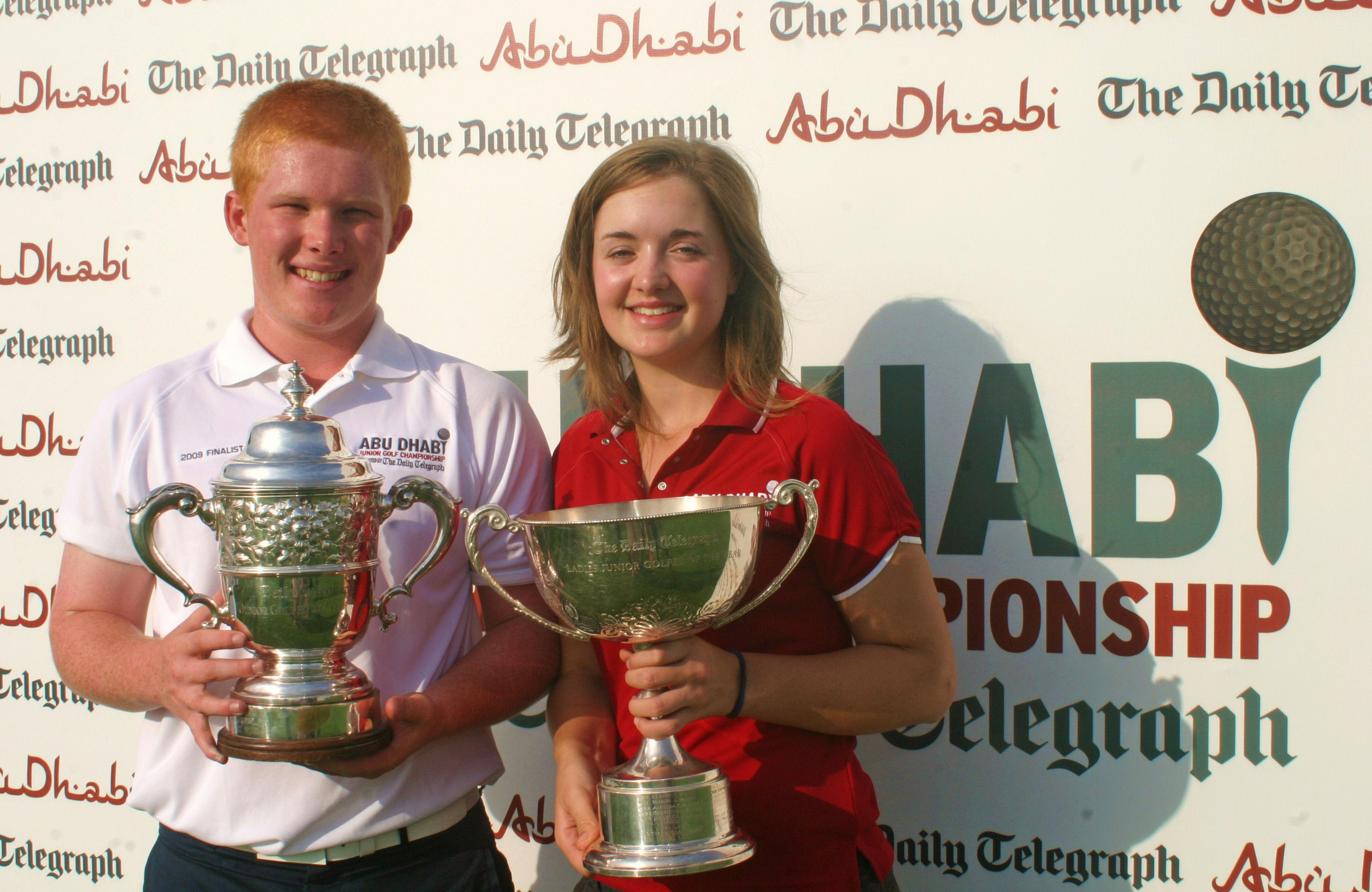
Chris Lloyd and Alexandra Peters display their trophies after winning the 2009 boys and girls titles

The Abu Dhabi Junior Golf Championship (ADJGC), in association with The Telegraph, is an international golf tournament for players under the age of 18 years.

== Background ==
The tournament has its origins in the 1960s, when it was organised by The Daily Telegraph. In the early days it was an informally organised competition that took place during the school holidays. Today it attracts a considerable field of junior golfers from Great Britain and Ireland and offers boys and girls the opportunity to experience a major tournament and ultimately bid to become the Junior Golf Champion. In recent years around 40,000 juniors have taken part in the qualifying round.

It is open to all permanent British and Irish residents under the age of 18 at the start of the year. A handicap of 28 and below for boys and 36 and below for girls is required.

== Format ==
The finals of the Abu Dhabi Junior Golf Championship, in association with The Telegraph, will feature 10 boys who qualify via the leaderboard, one boy who will receive a sponsor’s invite, the girls' defending champion Hayley Davis, seven girls who qualify via the leaderboard and one girl who will receive a sponsor’s invite . The winner of the Abu Dhabi Golf Club Junior Open, which took place the month before, will also complete the 21-strong field.

Before the finals begin, a challenge match will take place, in which 21 of the UAE and Middle East’s best young players will compete with the visitors.

== History ==
Success in the tournament has acted as a springboard for some of the young golfers, with past winners including Justin Rose and Andrew Coltart, who have gone on to play at the highest level. Current boys and girls champions Stiggy Hodgson and Carly Booth have both represented Great Britain and Ireland in amateur tournaments.

Other past champions of note include Mhairi McKay, Rebecca Hudson, and Oliver Fisher.

== Winners ==
Boys

- 1985 Terry Berry
- 1986 Andrew Coltart
- 1987 Michael Watson
- 1988 Michael Welch
- 1989 Nick Ludwell
- 1990 Duncan Smith
- 1991 Graham Davidson
- 1992 Allan MacDonald
- 1993 Denny Lucas
- 1994 Denny Lucas
- 1995 David Wixon
- 1996 Graham Gordon
- 1997 Justin Rose
- 1998 David Griffiths
- 1999 David Skinns
- 2000 David Mallett
- 2001 Michael Nester
- 2002 Michael Skelton
- 2003 James Ruth
- 2004 Jordan Findlay
- 2005 Oliver Fisher
- 2006 Dale Whitnell
- 2007 Stiggy Hodgson
- 2008 Stiggy Hodgson
- 2009 Chris Lloyd
- 2010 Ben Taylor

Girls

- 1990 Elaine Wilson
- 1991 Mhairi McKay
- 1992 Andrea Murray
- 1993 Georgina Simpson
- 1994 Rebecca Hudson
- 1995 Rebecca Hudson
- 1996 Vicki Laing
- 1997 Rebecca Hudson
- 1998 Louise Kenney
- 1999 Rachel Adby
- 2000 Sophie Walker
- 2001 Sophie Walker
- 2002 Steph Evans
- 2003 Natalie Haywood
- 2004 Melissa Reid
- 2005 Jodi Ewart
- 2006 Sally Watson
- 2007 Carly Booth
- 2008 Carly Booth
- 2009 Alexandra Peters
- 2010 Hayley Davis

== Abu Dhabi's sponsorship ==
Abu Dhabi Tourism Authority have Title Sponsored the event since 2009 Abu Dhabi Tourism Authority (ADTA).

The involvement of ADTA, which manages and develops the emirate’s tourism industry, is part of its strategy to market Abu Dhabi as a premier golfing destination.

Abu Dhabi is home to the annual Abu Dhabi Golf Championship, a European Tour event that, along with the Qatar Masters and the Dubai Desert Classic, forms part of the early-season Gulf Swing of January and February each year.

Like the ADJGC, the Abu Dhabi Golf Championship is held at the Abu Dhabi Golf Club.

== 2009 championship ==
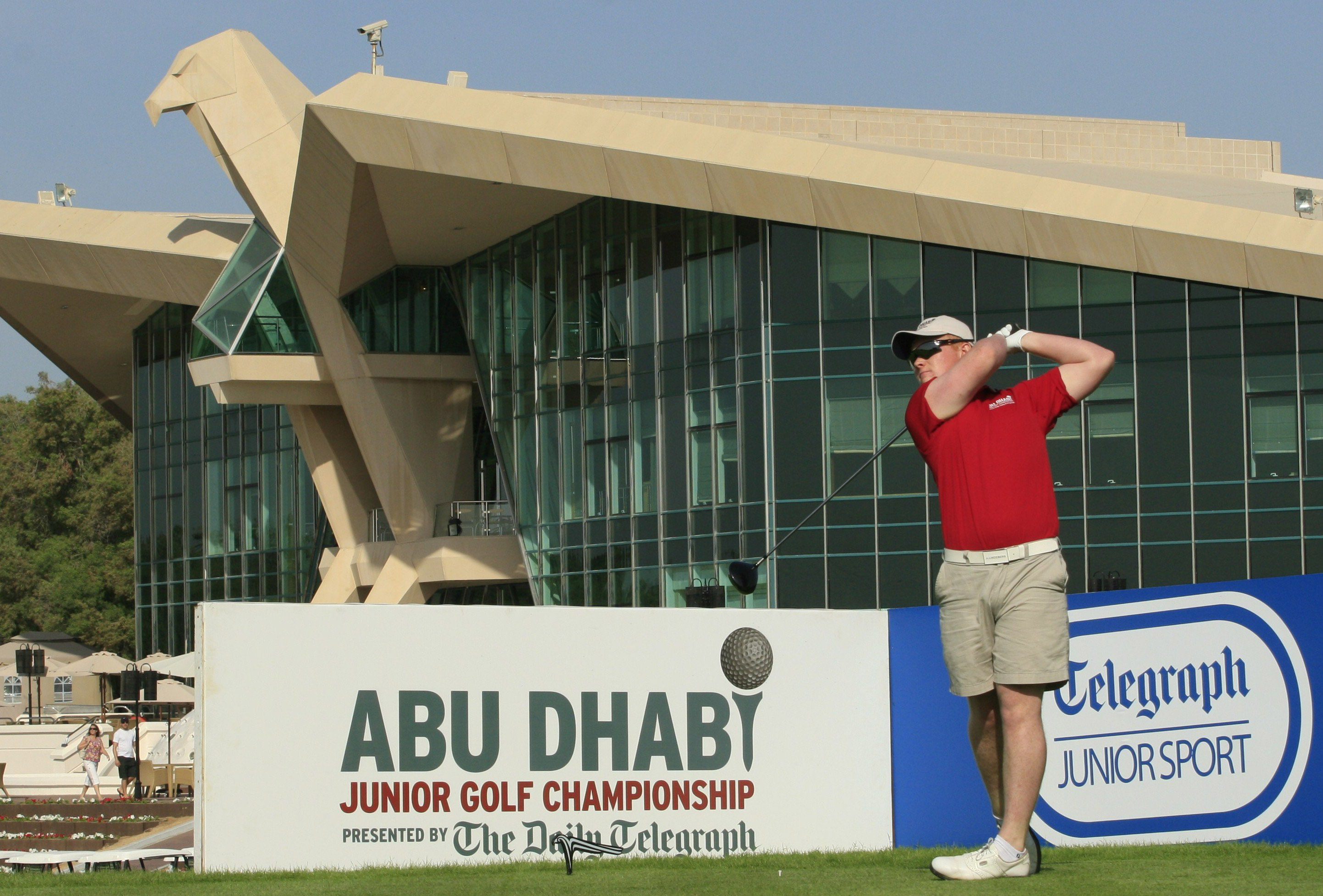
Chris Lloyd drives off in front of the Abu Dhabi Golf Club clubhouse

Chris Lloyd completed a thrilling finish to the tournament by overhauling long-time leader Tom Lewis to take the boys title. In the girls match, Alexandra Peters held on to her overnight lead on the final day to take the trophy.

Lloyd played a winning final round of 73 to beat Lewis, who had led by eight shots at the end of the first round and four shots going into the final day's play. Lloyd, 17, from Bristol, bore down on Lewis and took the lead on the 12th hole. With a one shot lead going into the final hole he held his nerve to win with a final score of 11 under. Tomasz Anderson took third place with a score of four over.

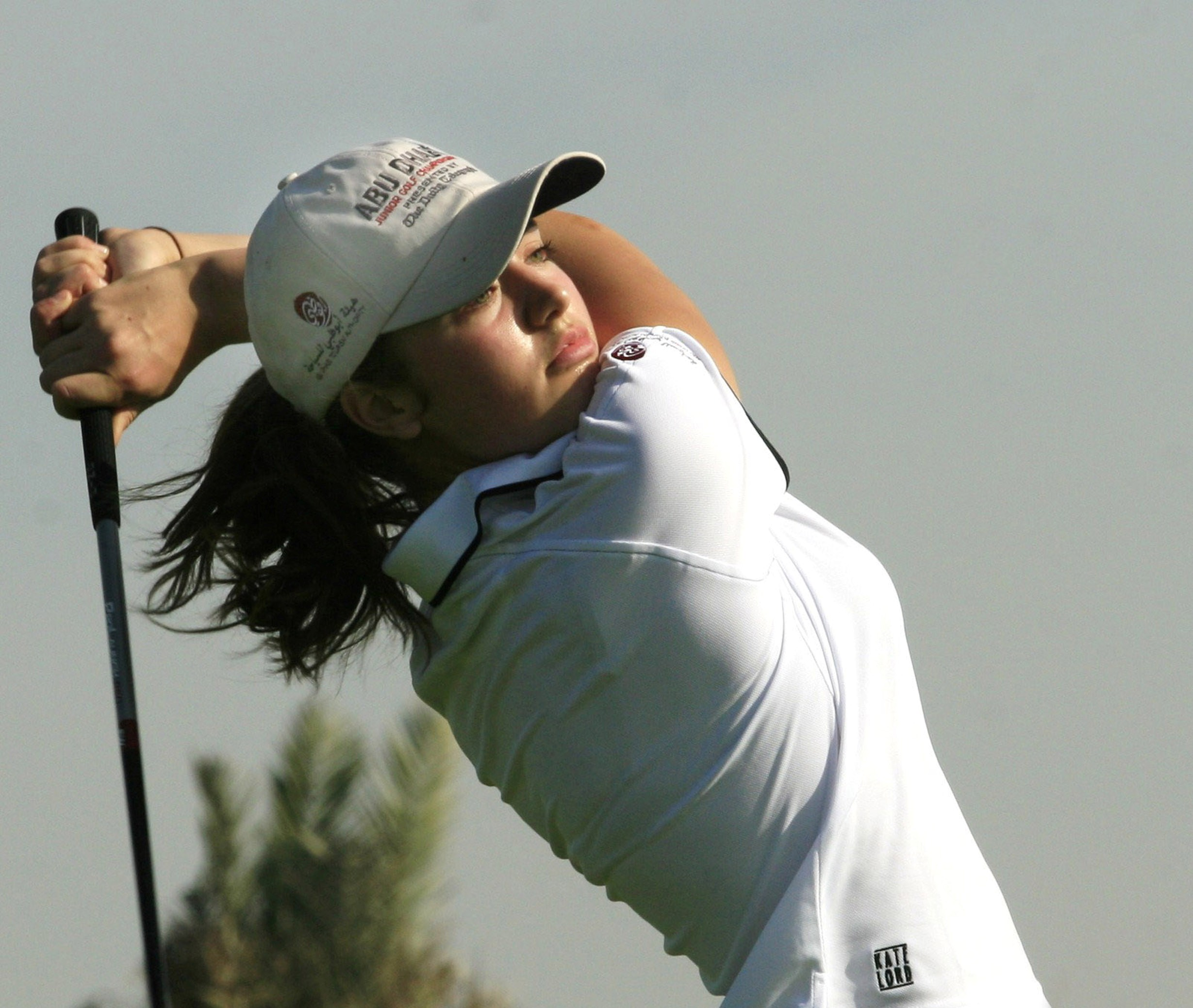
Alexandra Peters on the way to winning the 2009 girls title

Peters clinched the girls’ championship with a final score of five under, leaving her well ahead of nearest rival Jessica Wilcox who ended the tournament on level par. The 16-year-old, from Shifnal, Nottinghamshire, had gone into the final day with a four-shot lead and never looked in danger of losing it.

Finishing strongly, Wilcox jumped into second place helped by a run of three birdies on the front nine, ahead of Holly Clyburn and Heidi Baek who both recorded scores of three over.

== 2008 championship ==
Stiggy Hodgson holed a 15-ft birdie putt on the second playoff hole to beat Tommy Fleetwood and win the 2008 Abu Dhabi Junior Golf Championship boys title. The two leaders finished 12 shots ahead of the field by finishing 12 under par over the three rounds.

Hodgson, who plays with an unorthodox swing with its exaggerated head turn, did not drop a shot until the last hole, a poor bunker recovery and three-putt against Fleetwood's seventh birdie, cancelling out a seemingly decisive two-stroke lead to take the final into sudden death.

Carly Booth, meanwhile, was untroubled by any of the competing girls as she decisively took the title. Her win by six shots at four under illustrated her mastery of the Abu Dhabi Golf Club’s National course.
