= 1997 European Ladies' Team Championship =

Golf competition

Tournament information
- Dates: 9–13 July 1997
- Location: Åminnefors, Finland; 60°05′25″N 23°34′25″E
- Course: Nordcenter Golf & Country Club
- Organized by: European Golf Association
- Format: 36 holes stroke play Knock-out match-play

Statistics
- Par: 72
- Field: 16 teams 96 players

Champion
- Sweden; Susanna Berglund, Susanne Gillemo, Marie Hedberg, Ulrica Jidflo, Jessica Lindbergh, Isabelle Rosberg
- Qualification round: 737 (+17); Final match 4–3

Location map
- Location in Europe Location in Finland

The 1997 European Ladies' Team Championship took place 9–13 July at Nordcenter Golf & Country Club in Åminnefors, Finland. It was the 20th women's golf amateur European Ladies' Team Championship.

== Venue ==
The hosting club was founded in 1988. Its first course, the Fream course, situated in Åminnefors, close to Pohja in the province of Southern Finland and part of the Uusimaa region, 70 kilometres west of Helsinki, Finland, was designed by architect Ronald Fream. The course meanders across a varied landscape from a lush seashore towards a forest plateau full of steep elevation changes and the old park area of a manor house.

A second 18-hole-course, the Benz course, located on a forest plateau, was designed by Bradford Benz and inaugurated in 1993.

The championship course was set up with par 72.

== Format ==
All participating teams played two qualification rounds of stroke-play with six players, counted the five best scores for each team.

The eight best teams formed flight A, in knock-out match-play over the next three days. The teams were seeded based on their positions after the stroke-play. The first placed team was drawn to play the quarter-final against the eight placed team, the second against the seventh, the third against the sixth and the fourth against the fifth. In each match between two nation teams, two 18-hole foursome games and five 18-hole single games were played. Teams were allowed to switch players during the team matches, selecting other players in to the afternoon single games after the morning foursome games. Games all square after 18 holes were declared halved, if the team match was already decided.

The eight teams placed 9–16 in the qualification stroke-play formed flight B, to play similar knock-out match-play, with one foursome game and four single games, to decide their final positions.

== Teams ==
16 nation teams contested the event. Each team consisted of six players.

Players in the leading teams

Country	Players
Denmark	Camilla Faaborg-Andersen, Karen Margrethe Juul, Christina Kuld, Amanda Mooltke-Leth, Rikke Rasmussen, Carina Vagner
England	Fiona Brown, Kate Burton, Rebecca Hudson, Elaine Ratcliffe, Kim Rostron, Karen Stupples
Ireland	Alison Coffey, Suzanne Fanagan, Hazel Kavanagh, Michelle McGreevy, Eileen Rose McDaid Power, Ada O'Sullivan
France	Stéphanie Arricau, Jeanne-Marie Busuttil, Karine Icher, Ludvine Kreutz, Gwladys Nocera, Amadine Vincent
Germany	Britta Echterling, Elisabeth Esterl, Heidi Klump, Anika Heuser, Esther Poburski, Nicole Stillig
Italy	Isabelle Calogero, Maria Paola Casati, Silvia Cavalleri, Anna Nistri, Giulia Sergas
Scotland	Anne Laing, Sharon McMaster, Hilary Monoghan, Janice Moodie, Lesley Nicholson, Alison Rose
Spain	Sara Beautell, Itziar Elguezabal, Ana Larraneta, Maria José Pons, Marta Prieto, Ana Belen Sanchez
Sweden	Susanna Berglund, Susanne Gillemo, Marie Hedberg, Ulrica Jidflo, Jessica Lindbergh, Isabelle Rosberg
Wales	Louise Davis, Natalie Evans, Helen Lawson, Becky Morgan, Elenor Pilgrim, Vicki Thomas

Other participating teams

Country
Austria
Belgium
Czech Republic
Finland
Netherlands
Switzerland

== Winners ==
Team Italy and team France tied the lead in the opening 36-hole qualifying competition, each with a score of 7 over par 727, three strokes ahead of team England. Italy earned first place on the tie breaking better total non-counting scores.

Individual leader in the 36-hole stroke-play competition was Karine Icher, France, with a score of 7 under par 137, two strokes ahead of Janice Moodie, Scotland.

Team Sweden won the championship, beating Scotland 4–3 in the final and earned their third title. Team France earned third place, beating Wales 5–2 in the bronze match.

== Results ==
Qualification round

Team standings

Place	Country	Score	To par
T1	Italy *	363-364=727	+7
T1	France	362-365=727	+7
3	England	363-367=730	+10
4	Denmark	363-369=732	+12
T5	Wales *	364-371=735	+15
T5	Scotland *	368-367=735	+15
T5	Spain	362-373=735	+15
8	Sweden	368-369=737	+17
9	Switzerland	374-367=741	+21
10	Ireland	374-368=742	+22
11	Austria	376-370=746	+26
12	Belgium	382-378=760	+40
13	Germany	377-384=761	+41
14	Finland	385-378=763	+43
15	Czech Republic	386-383=769	+49
16	Netherlands	385-386=771	+51

* Note: In the event of a tie the order was determined by the better total non-counting scores.

Individual leaders

Place	Player	Country	Score	To par
1	Karine Icher	France	70-67=137	−7
2	Janice Moodie	Scotland	69-70=139	−5
T3	Itziar Elguezabal	Spain	69-71=140	−4
T3	Elaine Ratcliffe	England	69-71=140	−4
5	Annabelle Haxhe	Belgium	69-72=141	−3
T6	Barbara Albisetti	Switzerland	72-70=142	−2
T6	Silvia Cavalleri	Italy	72-70=142	−2
T6	Lilian Mensi-Klarbach	Austria	72-70=142	−2
T6	Eleanor Pilgrim	Wales	70-72=142	−2
T6	Rikke Rasmussen	Denmark	71-71=142	−2

Note: There was no official award for the lowest individual score.

Flight A

Bracket

Quarter finals
France	4
Spain	3
Scotland	5
England	2
Wales	4
Denmark	3
Sweden	4
Italy	3

Semi finals
Scotland	5.5
France	1.5
Sweden	5
Wales	2

Final
Sweden	4
Scotland	3
Bronze match
France	5
Wales	2

Elimination matches
Italy	6
Denmark	1
Spain	4
England	3

Match for 5th place
Spain	5
Italy	2
Match for 7th place
England	6
Denmark	1

Final games

Sweden	Scotland
4	3
S. Berglund / I. Rosberg	H. Monaghan / A. Rose 2 & 1
M. Hedberg / U. Jidflo	J. Moody / L. Nicholson 1 hole
Isabelle Rosberg 2 holes	Alison Rose
Susanne Gillemo 1 hole	Hilary Monoghan
Ulrica Jidflo	Janice Moodie 6 & 4
Jessica Lindberg 2 & 1	Anne Laing
Marie Hedberg 2 & 1	Lesley Nicholson

Flight B

Bracket

Round 1
Ireland	5
Czech Republic	0
Austria	3.5
Finland	1.5
Germany	4
Belgium	1
Switzerland	3.5
Netherlands	1.5

Round 2
Ireland	3
Austria	2
Germany	4
Switzerland	1

Match for 9th place
Germany	3
Ireland	2
Match for 11th place
Austria	3
Switzerland	2

Elimination matches
Netherlands	3
Belgium	2
Czech Republic	3
Finland	2

Match for 13th place
Netherlands	3.5
Czech Republic	1.5
Match for 15th place
Belgium	3.5
Finland	1.5

Final standings

Place	Country
1st place, gold medalist(s)	Sweden
2nd place, silver medalist(s)	Scotland
3rd place, bronze medalist(s)	France
4	Wales
5	Spain
6	Italy
7	England
8	Denmark
9	Germany
10	Ireland
11	Austria
12	Switzerland
13	Netherlands
14	Czech Republic
15	Belgium
16	Finland

== See also ==
- Espirito Santo Trophy – biennial world amateur team golf championship for women organized by the International Golf Federation.
- European Amateur Team Championship – European amateur team golf championship for men organised by the European Golf Association.
