= 2000 Curtis Cup =

Golf competition in Ganton, New Yorkshire, England

Coordinates: 54.190°N 0.495°W

31st Curtis Cup Match
- Dates: 24–25 June 2000
- Venue: Ganton Golf Club
- Location: Ganton, North Yorkshire, England
- Captains: Claire Dowling (GB&I); Jane Bastanchury Booth (USA)
(United Kingdom) (Republic of Ireland)	8	10	(United States)
- United States wins the Curtis Cup

The 31st Curtis Cup Match was played on 24 and 25 June 2000 at Ganton Golf Club in Ganton, North Yorkshire, England. The United States won 10 to 8.

== Format ==
The contest was a two-day competition, with three foursomes and six singles matches on each day, a total of 18 points.

Each of the 18 matches was worth one point in the larger team competition. If a match was all square after the 18th hole extra holes were not played. Rather, each side earned 1/2 a point toward their team total. The team that accumulated at least 9 1/2 points won the competition. In the event of a tie, the current holder retained the Cup.

== Teams ==
Eight players for Great Britain & Ireland and USA participated in the event plus one non-playing captain for each team.

& Great Britain & Ireland
Name	Age	Notes
(Republic of Ireland) Claire Dowling	42	non-playing captain
(England) Kim Andrew	26	played in 1998
(Wales) Becky Brewerton	17
(England) Fiona Brown	26	played in 1998
(England) Emma Duggleby	28
(England) Rebecca Hudson	21	played in 1998
(Wales) Becky Morgan	25	played in 1998
(Scotland) Lesley Nicholson	24
(Republic of Ireland) Suzanne O'Brien	33

Team USA
Name	Age	Notes
Jane Bastanchury Booth	52	non-playing captain
Elizabeth Bauer	19	played in 1998
Leland Beckel	33
Virginia Grimes	36	played in 1998
Hilary Homeyer	21
Stephanie Keever	21
Angela Stanford	21
Carol Semple Thompson	51	played 10 times from 1974 to 1998
Robin Weiss	45	played in 1990 and 1992

== Saturday's matches ==
=== Morning foursomes ===
&	Results
Andrew/Morgan	(United States) 1 up	Bauer/Thompson
Brewerton/Hudson	(United States) 1 up	Keever/Stanford
Duggleby/O'Brien	halved	Homeyer/Grimes
1/2	Session	2 1/2
1/2	Overall	2 1/2

=== Afternoon singles ===
&	Results
Kim Andrew	(United States) 3 & 2	Beth Bauer
Rebecca Hudson	(United States) 4 & 2	Stephanie Keever
Fiona Brown	(United States) 1 up	Robin Weiss
Lesley Nicholson	halved	Angela Stanford
Suzanne O'Brien	(United Kingdom) (Republic of Ireland) 3 & 1	Leland Beckel
Emma Dubbleby	(United States) 1 up	Hilary Homeyer
1 1/2	Session	4 1/2
2	Overall	7

== Sunday's matches ==
=== Morning foursomes ===
&	Results
Brewerton/Hudson	(United Kingdom) (Republic of Ireland) 2 & 1	Bauer/Thompson
Duggleby/O'Brien	(United Kingdom) (Republic of Ireland) 7 & 6	Keever/Stanford
Andrew/Morgan	(United States) 3 & 1	Homeyer/Grimes
2	Session	1
4	Overall	8

=== Afternoon singles ===
&	Results
Rebecca Hudson	(United States) 1 up	Beth Bauer
Suzanne O'Brien	(United Kingdom) (Republic of Ireland) 3 & 2	Robin Weiss
Emma Duggleby	(United Kingdom) (Republic of Ireland) 4 & 2	Stephanie Keever
Rebecca Brewerton	(United States) 3 & 2	Hilary Homeyer
Rebecca Morgan	(United Kingdom) (Republic of Ireland) 5 & 4	Angela Stanford
Kim Andrew	(United Kingdom) (Republic of Ireland) 6 & 5	Virginia Derby Grimes
4	Session	2
8	Overall	10
