= English Women's Open Amateur Stroke Play Championship =

Tournament information
- Location: England
- Established: 1984
- Organised by: England Golf
- Format: Stroke play

The English Women's Open Amateur Stroke Play Championship is the national women's amateur stroke play golf championship in England. Entry is open to all amateur golfers. It has been played annually at since 1984 and is organised by the England Golf. Originally it was a close event, restricted to English golfers, becoming open in 2009.

== Winners ==
Year	Winner	Score	Margin of victory	Runner(s)-up	Venue	Ref.
2026	(Australia) Jazy Roberts		7 strokes	(Switzerland) Carlotta Locatelli	Ganton	
2025	(England) Sadie Adams		1 stroke	Davina Xanh	Alwoodley	
2024	(England) Lily Hirst	290	4 strokes	(Wales) Darcey Harry	Stoneham	
2023	(Australia) Abbie Teasdale	288	Playoff	(England) Nellie Ong	Manchester	
2022	(Italy) Alessia Nobilio	287	Playoff	(Denmark) Christina Thouber	Beau Desert	
2021	(England) Isobel Wardle	280	9 strokes	(England) Ellie Gower	Wallasey	
2020	(England) Annabell Fuller	282	3 strokes	(England) Emma Allen	Burnham & Berrow	
2019	(England) Rebecca Earl	286	1 stroke	(England) Rosie Belsham (England) Sharna Dutrieux (England) Lily May Humphreys (Scotland) Shannon McWilliam	Ipswich	
2018	(Austria) Isabella Holpfer	279	11 strokes	(Netherlands) Pasqualle Coffa	Coventry	
2017	(England) Isobel Wardle	289	1 stroke	(England) Dulcie Sverdloff	Woodhall Spa	
2016	(England) Emily Price	285	2 strokes	(England) Georgia Price	Bristol & Clifton	
2015	(England) Samantha Giles	289	1 stroke	(England) Rochelle Morris	St Annes Old Links	
2014	(England) Hayley Davis	280	6 strokes	(Wales) Becky Harries	Tandridge	
2013	(Wales) Amy Boulden	285	Playoff	(England) Charlotte Thomas	Mannings Heath	
2012	(England) Alexandra Peters	289	6 strokes	(England) Charlotte Thompson	Little Aston	
2011	(England) Charley Hull	279	4 strokes	(England) Charlotte Wild	Alwoodley	
2010	(South Korea) Julie Yang	284	2 strokes	(England) Charlotte Ellis	Whittington Heath	
2009	(England) Charlotte Wild	291	1 stroke	(England) Hannah Burke (England) Charlotte Ellis	Enmore Park	
2008	(England) Jodi Ewart	285	Playoff	(England) Liz Bennett	The Berkshire	
2007	(England) Jodi Ewart	304	2 strokes	(England) Danielle Montgomery	Silloth-on-Solway	
2006	(England) Liz Bennett	290	2 strokes	(England) Sophie Walker	Little Aston	
2005	(England) Laura Eastwood	287	5 strokes	(England) Kiran Matharu	St Annes Old Links	
2004	(England) Sian Reddick	285	5 strokes	(England) Fame More (England) Kerry Smith	Woodhall Spa	
2003	(England) Sophie Walker	303	Playoff	(England) Lisa Ball	Saunton	
2002	(England) Sara Garbutt	294	2 strokes	(England) Danielle Masters	Whittington Heath	
2001	(England) Caroline Marron	291	Playoff	(England) Clare Lipscombe (England) Christine Quinn (England) Emma Weeks	Stoneham	
2000	(England) Rebecca Hudson	290	6 strokes	(England) Alison Waller	Silloth-on-Solway	
1999	(England) Clare Lipscombe	300	2 strokes	(England) Emma Duggleby (England) Kirsty Fisher	Gog Magog	
1998	(England) Emma Duggleby	306	1 stroke	(England) Lisa Meredith	Broadstone	
1997	(England) Lynn Tupholme	293	7 strokes	(England) Emma Duggleby	Hankley Common	
1996	(England) Sarah Gallagher	290	7 strokes	(England) Joanne Hockley (England) Elaine Ratcliffe	Little Aston	
1995	(England) Lisa Walton	289	8 strokes	(England) Emma Fields	Hallamshire	
1994	(England) Fiona Brown	289	4 strokes	(England) Kate Egford (England) Simone Morgan	Ferndown	
1993	(England) Julie Hall	298	Playoff	(England) Kate Egford	Kings Norton	
1992	(England) Joanne Morley	289	3 strokes	(England) Nicola Buxton	Littlestone	
1991	(England) Joanne Morley	301	2 strokes	(England) Joanne Hockley	Ganton	
1990	(England) Katie Tebbet	299	5 strokes	(England) Joanne Morley	Saunton	
1989	(England) Sara Robinson	302	Playoff	(England) Allison Shapcott	Notts Ladies'	
1988	(England) Sally Prosser	297	2 strokes	(England) Julie Wade	Wentworth	
1987	(England) Julie Wade	296	7 strokes	(England) Alison Johns	Northumberland	
1986	(England) Susan Shapcott	301	3 strokes	(England) Lisa Hackney	Broadstone	
1985	(England) Trish Johnson	301	2 strokes	(England) Caroline Pierce	Northamptonshire County	
1984	(England) Penny Grice	300	Playoff	(England) Trish Johnson	Moor Park	
