= Belén Mozo =

Spanish golfer

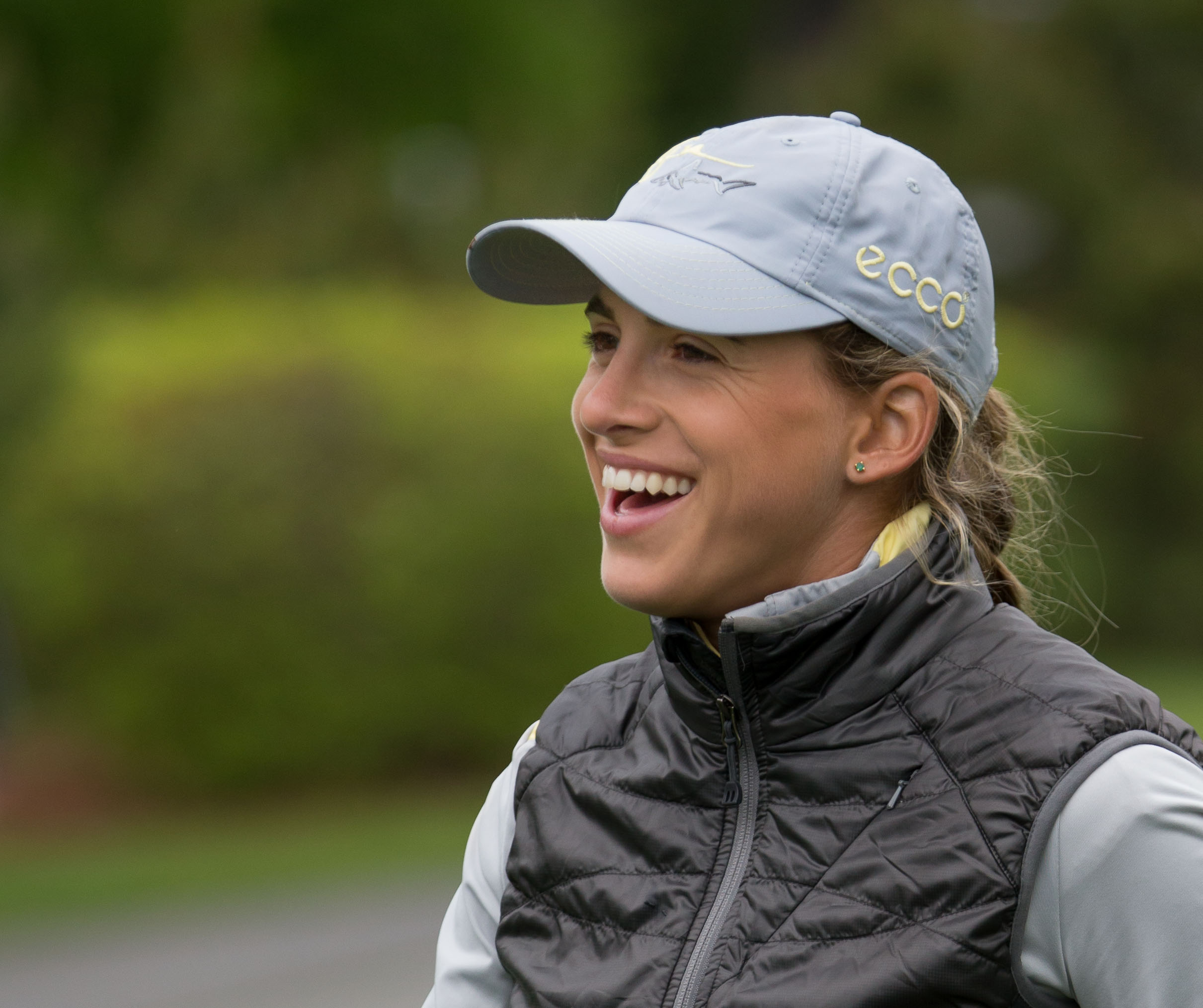
- Mozo at the 2013 Kingsmill Championship

Personal information
- Nationality: Spain
- Born: 25 September 1988 (age 38) Cádiz, Spain
- Height: 5 ft 7 in (1.70 m)

Career
- Sport: Golf
- College: U. of Southern California
- Turned professional: 2010
- Current tours: LPGA Tour (joined 2011); Ladies European Tour

Best results in LPGA major championships
- Chevron Championship: T41: 2013
- Women's PGA C'ship: T58: 2013
- U.S. Women's Open: T55: 2014
- Women's British Open: T29: 2014
- Evian Championship: T37: 2013

Belén Mozo (born 25 September 1988) is a Spanish professional golfer who plays on the LPGA Tour and the Ladies European Tour.

As an amateur, Mozo won the British Ladies Amateur Golf Championship in 2006. Later that year she joined the USC Trojans golf team. After four years of collegiate golf, she turned professional, qualifying to join the LPGA Tour as a rookie in the 2011 season.

== Amateur wins ==
- 2004 AJGA Thunderbird Invitational, Doral-Publix Junior Classic
- 2006 International European Ladies Amateur Championship, British Ladies Amateur Golf Championship, Girls Amateur Championship

== Results in LPGA majors ==
Results not in chronological order before 2015.

Tournament	2006	2007	2008	2009	2010	2011	2012	2013	2014	2015	2016	2017
ANA Inspiration							CUT	T41		CUT		
Women's PGA Championship						CUT	T59	T58	WD	CUT	CUT	T59
U.S. Women's Open						CUT	CUT	CUT	T55	CUT		CUT
Women's British Open	70	T55				CUT	CUT	CUT	T29			
The Evian Championship ^								T37	CUT	CUT		

^ The Evian Championship was added as a major in 2013

Did not play

CUT = missed the half-way cut
WD = withdrew
"T" = tied

=== Summary ===
Tournament	Wins	2nd	3rd	Top-5	Top-10	Top-25	Events	Cuts made
ANA Inspiration	0	0	0	0	0	0	3	1
Women's PGA Championship	0	0	0	0	0	0	7	3
U.S. Women's Open	0	0	0	0	0	0	6	1
Women's British Open	0	0	0	0	0	0	6	3
The Evian Championship	0	0	0	0	0	0	3	1
Totals	0	0	0	0	0	0	25	9

- Most consecutive cuts made – 3 (2013 Evian – 2014 British)
- Longest streak of top-10s – 0

== Team appearances ==
Amateur

- Junior Ryder Cup (representing Europe): 2004 (winners)
- Junior Solheim Cup (representing Europe): 2003 (winners), 2005
- European Ladies' Team Championship (representing Spain): 2005 (winners), 2007 (winners), 2008
- Espirito Santo Trophy (representing Spain): 2006, 2008

Professional

- International Crown (representing Spain): 2014 (winners)
