= Samantha Giles (golfer) =

Englisg professional golfer (born 1994)

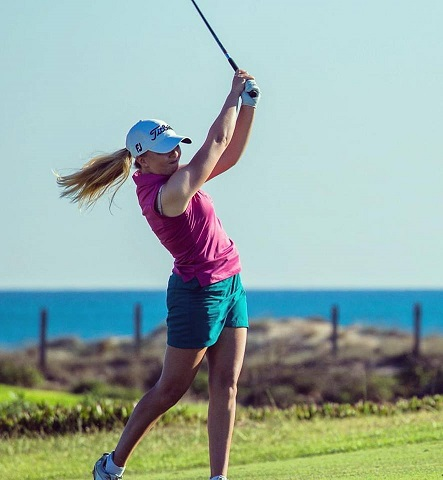
- Giles at Saler, Spain, LET Access/Santander Tour event, October 2017

Personal information
- Full name: Samantha Jo Giles
- Nickname: Sammie
- Nationality: England
- Born: 28 October 1994 (age 32) Plymouth, England
- Height: 5 ft 2 in (1.57 m)

Career
- Sport: Golf
- Turned professional: 2017
- Current tour: LET Access Series

Samantha Jo Giles (born 28 October 1994) is a Cornish professional golfer who currently plays on the Ladies European Tour, LET Access Series and Rose Ladies Series professional tours and has represented England at the highest amateur level. Giles is the first female amateur golfer to hold all three major English women's amateur titles, English Women's Mid-Amateur, English Women's Open Amateur Stroke Play Championship and the English Women's Amateur Championship. She has also been Cornwall's women's county champion (2015).

== Early career ==
Giles was born in Plymouth to parents Paul and Carol, both of whom had represented England at table tennis, Carol at the Commonwealth Games and Paul as national champion. She had an early interest in swimming, dancing and golf. From the age of 11, Giles concentrated on golf and competed in regional, national and European events. Since the age of 16 Giles has trained full-time with the objective of turning professional, which she achieved in 2017.

As an amateur her most important successes were joining the England Golf Women's team, winning the 2014 English women's mid-amateur championship, 2015 Cornish Women's Championship, 2015 English Women's Open Amateur Stroke Play Championship, the Royal Birkdale Golf Club Ladies Scratch Trophy, the 2016 English Women's Amateur Championship and the 2015 and 2016 Women's Home Internationals with England.

In January 2017, Giles was named as the Plymouth Herald Amateur Sports Personality of the Year for 2016.

== Professional career ==
Giles turned professional in April 2017 and played her first tournament as a professional at the Azores Ladies Open on the LET Access Series. She made the cut and finished joint 11th. Giles joined the newly formed Banco Santander Tour for her second professional event, the Banco Santander Open in Zaragoza, Spain. She managed her first top-10 finish as a professional.

In June, Giles achieved her first top-5 as a professional in her fourth event as a professional. This was followed by another top-15 finish on the LET Access Tour with a tied 13th-place finish in the Belfius Ladies Open at Rinkven Golf Club in Belgium in July. She closed out her first season as a professional golfer with a tied 13th finish at the joint Banco Santander and LET Access Series Tour event hosted at the El Saler golf club.

Giles began her second season as a professional with a top-5 finish at the Roehampton Club in April 2018. This was followed a few weeks later on the LET Access Series at the VP Bank Ladies Open in Gams, Switzerland. After successfully making the cut, she ended with a top-40 finish.

Despite suffering a knee injury whilst surfing in March 2019, Giles made a strong return to her third season as a professional by making the cut and recording a top 45 finish at the Montauban Open in June. The following week at the Belfius Open in Cleydael, Giles recorded her best ever performance as a professional with a top 5 finish having led the field over the first two days.

At her first attempt at the Ladies European Tour qualifying school in January 2020, Giles successfully made it through to the final qualifying round.

As of 2021, Giles has played in the first two seasons of the Rose Ladies Series with her best result a tied for 4th-place finish at Bearwood Lakes in September 2021. In December 2021, Giles competed in the Ladies European Tour qualifying school final round, having successfully passed the preliminarily round, and placed 59th.

== Notes ==
Giles plays out of the St. Mellion International Resort in Cornwall.

== Amateur wins ==
- 2010 The Daily Express Andalucia Junior Girls European Open
- 2011 The Daily Express Andalucia Junior Girls European Open
- 2012 The Daily Express Andalucia Junior Girls European Open
- 2014 English Women's Mid-Amateur & The Liphook Scratch Trophy
- 2015 Cornish Women's County Championship, English Women's Open Amateur Stroke Play Championship, Royal Birkdale Ladies Scratch,
- 2016 English Women's Amateur Championship,

== Team appearances ==
Amateur

- Women's Home Internationals (representing England): 2015 (winners), 2016 (winners)
