= 1995 European Ladies' Team Championship =

Golf competition

Tournament information
- Dates: 12–16 July 1995
- Location: Monza, Italy; 45.602°N 9.284°E
- Course: Golf Club Milano
- Organized by: European Golf Association
- Format: 36 holes stroke play Knock-out match-play

Statistics
- Par: 72
- Field: 19 teams 114 players

Champion
- Spain; Alejandra Armas, Sara Beautell, Itziar Elguezabal, Ana Larraneta, Maria José Pons, Ana Belen Sanchez
- Qualification round: 735 (+15); Final match 5–2

Location map
- Location in Europe Location in Italy Location in Lombardy region

The 1995 European Ladies' Team Championship took place 12–16 July at Golf Club Milano in Monza, Italy. It was the 19th women's golf amateur European Ladies' Team Championship.

== Venue ==
The hosting club was founded in 1928. The course, situated in Monza Park, the largest walled park in Europe, 20 kilometres north of the city center of Milan, Lombardy region in northern Italy, was designed by architect James Peter Gannon.

The championship course was set up with par 72.

== Format ==
All participating teams played two qualification rounds of stroke-play with six players, counted the five best scores for each team.

The eight best teams formed flight A, in knock-out match-play over the next three days. The teams were seeded based on their positions after the stroke-play. The first placed team was drawn to play the quarter-final against the eight placed team, the second against the seventh, the third against the sixth and the fourth against the fifth. In each match between two nation teams, two 18-hole foursome games and five 18-hole single games were played. Teams were allowed to switch players during the team matches, selecting other players in to the afternoon single games after the morning foursome games. Games all square after 18 holes were declared halved, if the team match was already decided.

The seven teams placed 9–15 in the qualification stroke-play formed flight B and the four teams placed 16–19 formed flight C, to play similar knock-out match-play, with one foursome game and four single games, to decide their final positions.

== Teams ==
A record number of 19 nation teams contested the event. Each team consisted of six players.

Players in the leading teams

Country	Players
Belgium	Isabelle Declerque, Annabelle Haxhe, Sophie Leten, Catherine Pons, Sophie Tornel, Valérie Van Ryckeghem
Denmark	Camilla Faaborg-Andersen, Lotte Greve, Karen Margrethe Juul, Christina Kuld, Caroline Rasmussen, Iben Tinning
England	Emma Duggleby, Sandy Lambert, Elaine Ratcliffe, Karen Stupples, Julie Hall, Lisa Walton
France	Maitena Alsuguren, Jeanne-Marie Busuttil, Ludivine Kreutz, Kristel Mourge d'Algue, Virgine Requier, Amadine Vincent
Germany	Diane Blam, Elisabeth Esterl, Luise Gehlen, Anika Heuser, Esther Poburski, Nicole Stillig
Ireland	Yvonne Cassidy, Eavan Higgins, Hazel Kavanagh, Eileen Rose McDaid Power, Mary McKenna, Ada O'Sullivan
Italy	Maria Paola Casati, Silvia Cavalleri, Antonella Manuli, Anna Nistri, Caterina Quintarelli, Alessandra Salvi
Netherlands	Nan Croockewit, Catryn Geleynse, Sandra Hoer, Marcella Neggers, Laura Thijssen, Marike Zelsman
Norway	Line Berg, Tine Faanes, Cecilie Lundgreen, Hanne Nyquist, Christine Norwang, Vibeke Stensrud
Scotland	Sharon McMaster, Mhairi McKay, Hilary Monoghan, Janice Moodie, Lesley Nicholson, Alison Rose
Spain	Alejandra Armas, Sara Beautell, Itziar Elguezabal, Ana Larraneta, Maria José Pons, Ana Belen Sanchez
Sweden	Anna Berg, Sara Eklund, Sofie Eriksson, Maria Hjorth, Mia Löjdahl, Helena Ohlsson
Wales	Lisa Dermott, Bethan Jones, Becky Morgan, Kate Stark, Julie Thomas, Vicki Thomas

Other participating teams

Country
Austria
Czech Republic
Finland
Iceland
Portugal
Switzerland

== Winners ==
Team Spain won the opening 36-hole qualifying competition, with a score of 15 over par 735, one stroke ahead of team Sweden.

Individual leader in the 36-hole stroke-play competition was Vibeke Stensrud, Norway, with a score of 4 under par 140, two strokes ahead of nearest competitors.

Team Spain won the championship, beating Scotland 5–2 in the final and earned their first title. Team England earned third place, beating Denmark 4–3 in the bronze match.

== Results ==
Qualification round

Team standings

Place	Country	Score	To par
1	Spain	366-369=735	+15
2	Sweden	369-367=736	+16
3	Italy	370-369=739	+19
4	England	380-366=746	+26
5	France	367-380=747	+27
6	Denmark	372-382=754	+34
7	Scotland	386-369=755	+35
8	Wales	387-375=762	+42
9	Norway	389-379=768	+48
10	Ireland	386-385=771	+51
11	Switzerland	390-382=772	+52
12	Germany	381-392=773	+53
13	Austria	399-377=776	+56
14	Netherlands	394-389=783	+63
15	Belgium	399-389=788	+68
16	Finland	401-408=809	+89
17	Iceland	411-412=823	+103
18	Portugal	426-398=824	+104
19	Czech Republic	410-418=828	+108

Individual leaders

Place	Player	Country	Score	To par
1	Vibeke Stensrud	Norway	71-69=140	−4
T2	Sofie Eriksson	Sweden	73-69=142	−2
T2	Janice Moodie	Scotland	75-67=142	−2
T2	Amadine Vincent	France	68-74=142	−2
5	Silvia Cavalleri	Italy	70-73=143	−1
T6	Sara Beautell	Spain	71-74=145	+1
T6	Becky Morgan	Wales	74-71=145	+1
T6	María José Pons	Spain	72-73=145	+1
T9	Julie Hall	England	72-74=146	+2
T9	Mia Löjdahl	Sweden	71-75=146	+2
T9	Catarina Quantarelli	Italy	74-72=146	+2
T9	Karen Stupples	England	75-71=146	+2
T9	Iben Tinning	Denmark	73-73=146	+2

Note: There was no official award for the lowest individual score.

Flight A

Bracket

Quarter finals
Scotland	5
Sweden	2
Denmark	5.5
Italy	1.5
England	4.5
France	2.5
Spain	4
Wales	3

Semi finals
Scotland	4.5
Denmark	2.5
Spain	5.5
England	1.5

Final
Spain	5
Scotland	2
Bronze match
England	4.5
Denmark	2.5

Elimination matches
Italy	5
Sweden	2
France	6
Wales	1

Match for 5th place
France	4
Italy	3
Match for 7th place
Sweden	5.5
Wales	1.5

Final games

Spain	Scotland
5	2
A. Larzaneta / M.J. Pons 3 & 1	M. McKay / J. Moodie
S. Beautell / A.B. Sanchez 25th hole	L. Nicholson / A. Rose
Izlar Elguezabal 19th hole	Janice Moodie
Ana Belen Sanchez	Alison Rose 2 & 1
Maria José Pons 5 & 3	Sharon McMaster
Sara Beautell 1 hole	Lesley Nichlson
Ana Lazraneta	Mhari McKay 2 & 1

Flight B

Bracket

Round 1
Germany	3
Austria	2
Ireland	3
Belgium	2
Netherlands	3
Switzerland	2

Round 2
Norway	3
Germany	2
Ireland	5
Netherlands	0

Match for 9th place
Norway	3.5
Ireland	1.5
Match for 11th place
Germany	3.5
Netherlands	1.5

Elimination match
Switzerland	4
Belgium	1

Match for 13th place
Austria	3.5
Switzerland	1.5

Flight C

Bracket

Elimination matches
Portugal	3
Iceland	2
Finland	4
Czech Republic	1

Match for 16th place
Finland	4
Portugal	1
Match for 18th place
Iceland	3
Czech Republic	2

Final standings

Place	Country
1st place, gold medalist(s)	Spain
2nd place, silver medalist(s)	Scotland
3rd place, bronze medalist(s)	England
4	Denmark
5	France
6	Italy
7	Sweden
8	Wales
9	Norway
10	Ireland
11	Germany
12	Netherlands
13	Austria
14	Switzerland
15	Belgium
16	Finland
17	Portugal
18	Iceland
19	Czech Republic

== See also ==
- Espirito Santo Trophy – biennial world amateur team golf championship for women organized by the International Golf Federation.
- European Amateur Team Championship – European amateur team golf championship for men organised by the European Golf Association.
