= Astrid Vayson de Pradenne =

French professional golfer

Personal information
- Nationality: France
- Born: 25 October 1985 (age 41) Avignon, France
- Height: 6 ft 0 in (1.83 m)

Career
- Sport: Golf
- College: University of Avignon; University of Plymouth
- Turned professional: 2013
- Former tours: Ladies European Tour (2018–2021); LET Access Series (2013–2018)
- Professional wins: 3

Number of wins by tour
- Ladies European Tour: 1
- Other: 2

Best results in LPGA major championships
- Chevron Championship: DNP
- Women's PGA C'ship: DNP
- U.S. Women's Open: DNP
- Women's British Open: CUT: 2018
- Evian Championship: CUT: 2018

Astrid Vayson de Pradenne (born 25 October 1985) is a French professional golfer who played on the Ladies European Tour from 2018 to 2021. She joined the LET after winning the dual-ranked Jabra Ladies Open on the LET Access Series.

== Career ==
Vayson de Pradenne started to play golf at the age of 15 and within two years had reached a scratch handicap. She turned professional 2011 and joined the LET Access Series in 2013. She was runner-up at the 2016 Azores Ladies Open behind Jenny Haglund, and in 2017 she lost a playoff to Luna Sobron at the Castellum Ladies Open in Sweden.

Her breakthrough came in 2018 when she, as a member of the LET Access Series, won the Jabra Ladies Open at Evian Resort Golf Club, a dual-ranking event with the LET. She therefore earned a winner's exemption and played in the remainder of the 2018 Ladies European Tour tournaments, including the 2018 Evian Championship at the same course and the 2018 Women's British Open. She finished 31st on the LET Order of Merit.

In 2019, Vayson de Pradenne played in 18 LET tournaments and made 10 cuts. She recorded three top-20 finishes and under pressure managed to retain her tour card by finishing fifth in the season-ending Magical Kenya Ladies Open, to finish 61st on the Order of Merit.

In 2020, she played two tournaments on the Sunshine Ladies Tour, and finished fourth at the Cape Town Ladies Open. She finished tied sixth in the Lacoste Ladies Open de France, five strokes behind winner Julia Engström.

Vayson de Pradenne made 10 cuts in 18 appearances on the LET in 2021, and decided at the end of the season to leave the tour and focus on her physiotherapy career.

== Personal life ==
De Pradenne graduated from the University of Avignon with an LLM in European Law in 2007, and with a BSc in Physiotherapy from the University of Plymouth (UK) in 2011.

== Professional wins (1) ==
=== Ladies European Tour wins (1) ===
| No. | Date | Tournament | Winning score | To par | Margin of victory | Runner-up |
|---|---|---|---|---|---|---|
| 1 | 3 Jun 2018 | Jabra Ladies Open^ | 70-69-67=206 | −10 | Playoff | (Germany) Karolin Lampert |

^Co-sanctioned with the LET Access Series

adies European Tour playoff record (1–0)

| No. | Year | Tournament | Opponent | Result |
|---|---|---|---|---|
| 1 | 2018 | Jabra Ladies Open | (Germany) Karolin Lampert | Won with birdie on first extra hole |

=== LET Access Series wins (1) ===
| No. | Date | Tournament | Winning score | To par | Margin of victory | Runner-up |
|---|---|---|---|---|---|---|
| 1 | 3 Jun 2018 | Jabra Ladies Open^ | 70-69-67=206 | −10 | Playoff | (Germany) Karolin Lampert |

^Co-sanctioned with the Ladies European Tour

LET Access Series playoff record (1–1)

| No. | Year | Tournament | Opponent | Result |
|---|---|---|---|---|
| 1 | 2017 | Castellum Ladies Open | (Spain) Luna Sobron | Lost to birdie on first extra hole |
| 2 | 2018 | Jabra Ladies Open | (Germany) Karolin Lampert | Won with birdie on first extra hole |

=== Other wins (2) ===
- 2016 Open d'Arcachon
- 2019 Verbier Cup (Swiss Pro Series)

== Results in LPGA majors ==
| Tournament | 2018 |
|---|---|
| ANA Inspiration | |
| U.S. Women's Open | |
| Women's PGA Championship | |
| The Evian Championship | CUT |
| Women's British Open | CUT |

Did not play

CUT = missed the half-way cut
"T" = tied
