= Emma Cabrera-Bello =

Spanish professional golfer (born 1985)

Emma Cabrera Bello
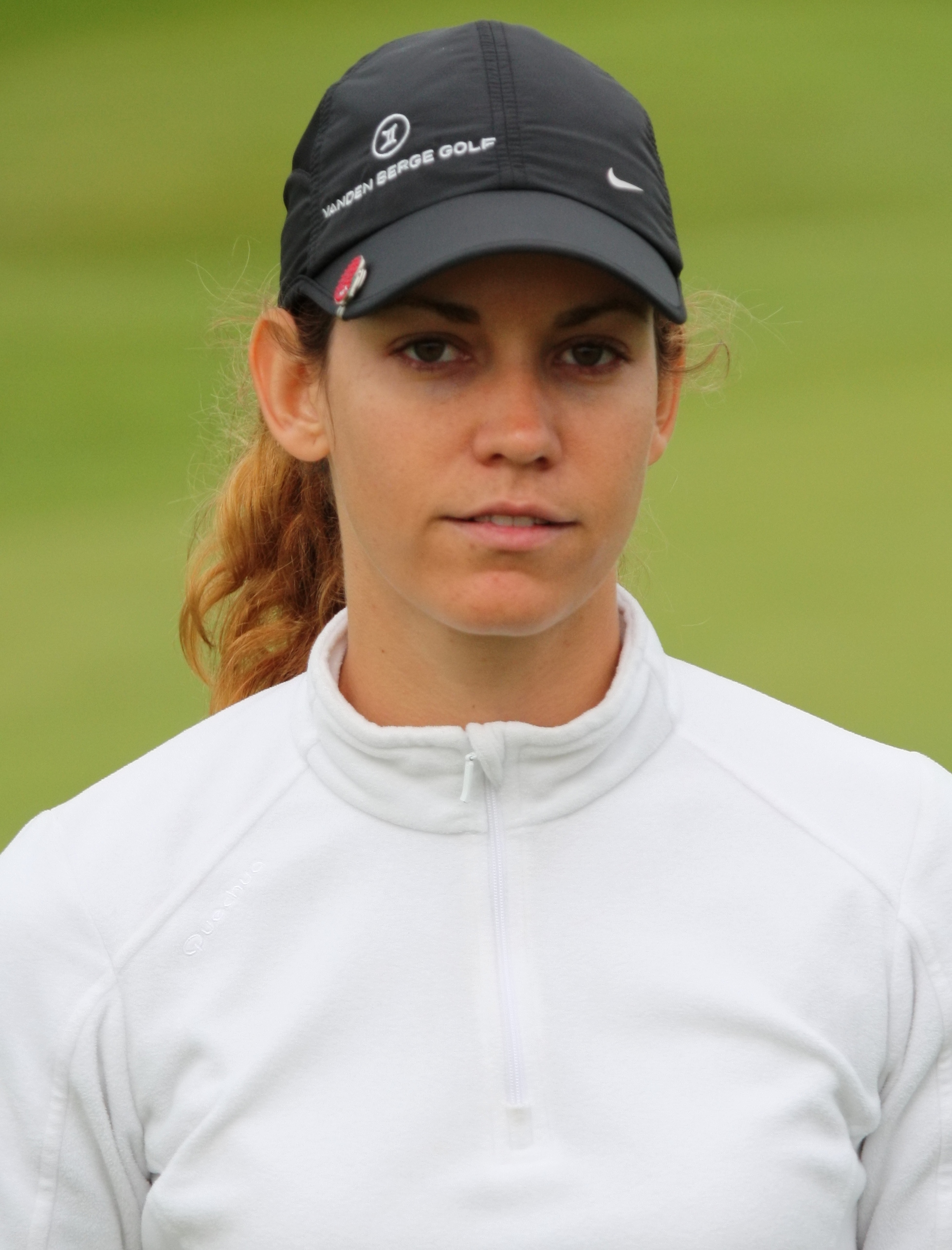
- Emma Cabrera Bello at 2009 Women's British Open

Personal information
- Full name: Emma Cabrera Bello
- Nationality: Spain
- Born: 22 November 1985 (age 40) Las Palmas, Gran Canaria, Spain
- Height: 172 cm (5 ft 8 in)

Career
- Sport: Golf
- College: University of Las Palmas de Gran Canaria
- Turned professional: 2008
- Former tour: Ladies European Tour (joined 2008)

Best results in LPGA major championships
- Chevron Championship: DNP
- Women's PGA C'ship: DNP
- U.S. Women's Open: DNP
- Women's British Open: CUT: 2009
- Evian Championship: DNP

Emma Cabrera Bello (born 22 November 1985) is a Spanish professional golfer. She played on the Ladies European Tour and was runner-up at the Open de España Femenino.

== Early life and family ==
Cabrera Bello was born in Las Palmas, Gran Canaria. She was first introduced to golf by her uncle at age five and went on to enjoy a successful amateur career, winning the Spanish National Championship at every age group level from under-16 through under-21.

Her brother Rafa Cabrera-Bello is also a professional golfer, playing on the PGA Tour and European Tour. Her younger brother Miguel has occasionally caddied for her.

== Amateur career ==
Cabrera Bello was a member of the Junior Ryder Cup team in 2002, a member of the Junior Solheim Cup team in 2002 and 2003, and also competed in the Vagliano Trophy in 2003, 2005 and 2007. The many titles that she won during a glittering amateur career include the 2001 French International Junior Championship, the 2001 European Young Masters, the 2005 Finnish Masters and the 2007 Biarritz Cup. She also won the U-16, U-18 and U-21 Spanish National Championship, the European Lady Junior's Team Championship in 2002, the European Girls' Team Championship in 2003 and the European Ladies' Team Championship in 2005 and 2007.

Cabrera Bello was an American Junior Golf Association All-American in 2003 and 2004. Between 2002 and 2007 she played in ten LET events while still an amateur, the 2002 Compaq Open in Sweden, four times in the Open de España Femenino (2002 she was best amateur and finished tied 11th), and five times in the Tenerife Ladies Open (2004 she finished joint 16th).

She finished 7th at Final Qualifying School for the 2008 season, qualifying for her full LET card at the first attempt.

== Professional career ==
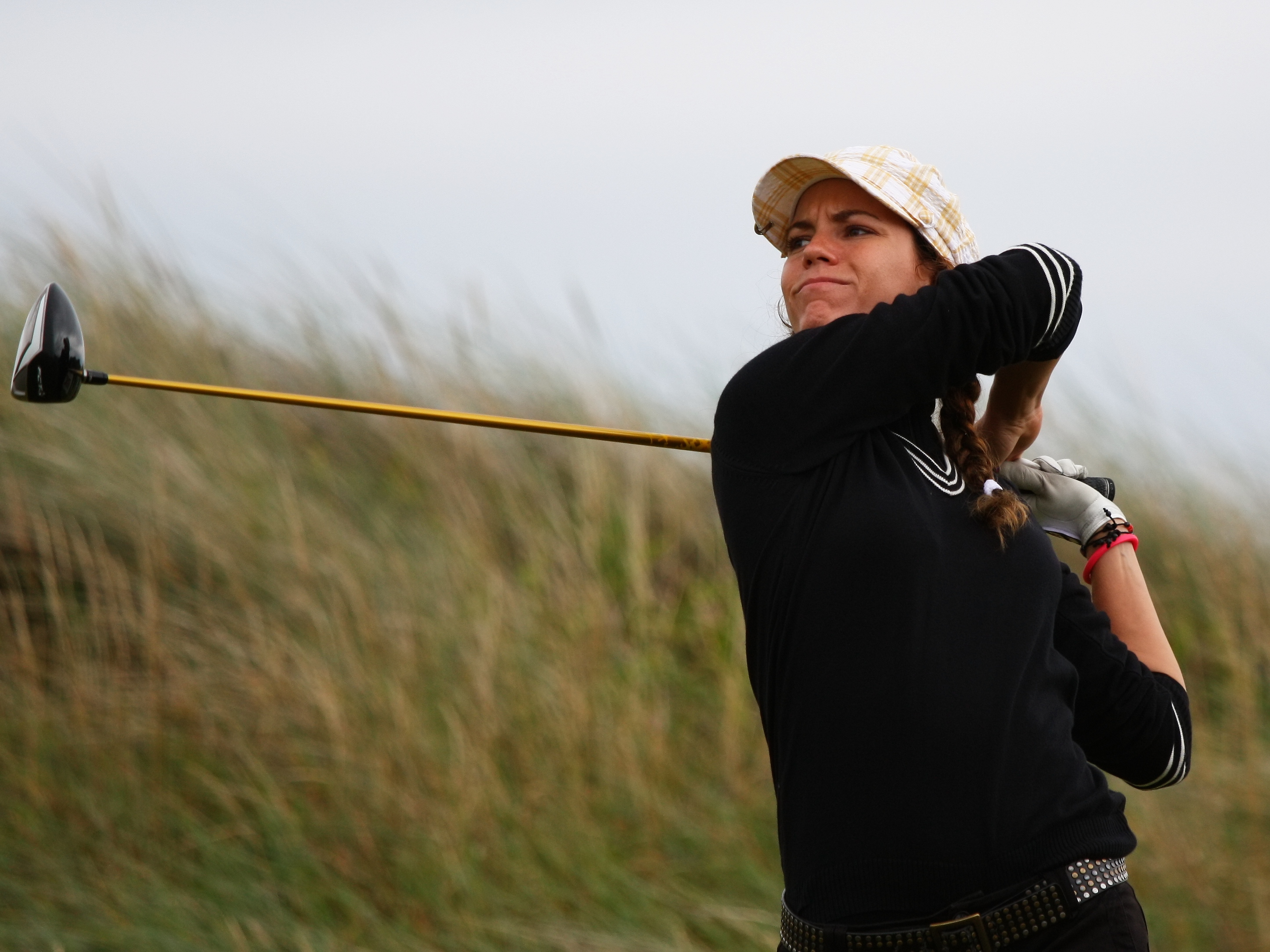
Cabrera-Bello hits her tee shot on the 18th hole during final qualifying round before 2010 Ricoh Women's British Open

A runner-up for the 2008 Rookie of the Year title, Cabrera Bello had her most successful season on the LET in 2009. Playing her best golf in Spain, she posted four top-10 finishes including a career best runner-up at the Open de España Femenino behind Becky Brewerton, and a tie for third at the Madrid Ladies Masters behind Azahara Muñoz and Anna Nordqvist. She was 9th at the Tenerife Ladies Open, and also 6th at the Ladies German Open. In 2010, her third season on the LET, she posted a season-best tie for 9th at the Ladies German Open and finished 76th on the Order of Merit. She also represented Spain at the European Nations Cup with Tania Elósegui and tied for 8th. Finishing 101st on the 2011 Order of Merit, she gave up playing on the LET full time after four seasons.

Cabrera Bello served on the LET Board of Directors 2015–2016.

== Amateur wins ==
- 2001 European Young Masters, French International Lady Juniors Amateur Championship
- 2003 Junior PGA Championship
- 2005 Finnish Masters
- 2007 Biarritz Cup

== Team appearances ==
Amateur

- European Young Masters (representing Spain): 2001
- Junior Ryder Cup (representing Europe): 2002
- Junior Solheim Cup (representing Europe): 2002, 2003
- European Lady Junior's Team Championship (representing Spain): 2002 (winners)
- Vagliano Trophy (representing the Continent of Europe): 2003, 2005, 2007 (winners)
- European Girls' Team Championship (representing Spain): 2003 (winners)
- European Ladies' Team Championship (representing Spain): 2001, 2003 (winners) 2005 (winners), 2007 (winners)

Professional

- European Nations Cup (representing Spain): 2010
