= 2007 European Ladies' Team Championship =

Golf competition

Tournament information
- Dates: 10–14 July 2007
- Location: Agrate Conturbia, Italy; 45°39′00″N 8°34′20″E
- Course: Golf Club Castelconturbia
- Organized by: European Golf Association
- Format: 36 holes stroke play Knock-out match-play

Statistics
- Par: 72
- Field: 16 teams 96 players

Champion
- Spain; Azahara Muñoz, Carlota Ciganda, Emma Cabrera-Bello, Araseli Felgueroso, Carmen Perez-Narbon, Belén Mozo
- Qualification round: 706 (−14); Final match 5–2

Location map
- Location in Europe Location in Italy Location in Piedmont

The 2007 European Ladies' Team Championship took place 10–14 July at Golf Club Castelconturbia in Agrate Conturbia, Italy. It was the 25th women's golf amateur European Ladies' Team Championship.

== Venue ==
The hosting Golf Club Castelconturbia was refounded in 1984. The three nine-hole courses, situated in Agrate Conturbia, in the Italian region of Piedmont, 60 kilometres north-west of Milan, on land were golf was played 90 years earlier, was designed by Robert Trent Jones Sr. and opened in 1987.

The club had previously twice hosted the Italian Open on the European Tour, 1991 and 1998.

== Format ==
All participating teams played two qualification rounds of stroke-play with six players, counted the five best scores for each team.

The eight best teams formed flight A, in knock-out match-play over the next three days. The teams were seeded based on their positions after the stroke-play. The first placed team was drawn to play the quarter-final against the eight placed team, the second against the seventh, the third against the sixth and the fourth against the fifth. In each match between two nation teams, two 18-hole foursome games and five 18-hole single games were played. Teams were allowed to switch players during the team matches, selecting other players in to the afternoon single games after the morning foursome games. Teams knocked out after the quarter-finals played one foursome game and four single games in each of their remaining matches. Games all square after 18 holes were declared halved, if the team match was already decided.

The eight teams placed 9–16 in the qualification stroke-play formed flight B, to play similar knock-out match-play, with one foursome game and four single games to decide their final positions.

== Teams ==
16 nation teams contested the event. Each team consisted of six players.

Players in teams

Country	Players
Austria	Stefanie Endstrasser, Cristina Gugler, Martina Hochwimmer, Nina Mühl, Sabina Pölderl, Christine Wolf
Belgium	Valentine Gevers, Emilie Geury, Laura Gonzalez Escallon, Laurence Herman, Tamara Luccioli, Bénédicte Thoumpsin
England	Rachel Bell, Naomi Edwards, Jodi Ewart, Florentyna Parker, Mel Reid, Kerry Smith
Finland	Satu Harju, Kaisa Korhonen, Suvi Mantyniemi, Elina Nummenpää, Rosa Svahn
France	Caroline Afonso, Audrey De Charne, Valentine Derrey, Elena Giraud, Morgane Bazin de Jessey, Alexandra Vilatte
Germany	Denise Becker, Stephanie Döring, Sandra Gal, Thea Hoffmeister, Stephanie Kirchmayr
Ireland	Karen Delaney, Tara Delaney, Danielle McVeigh, Maura Morrin, Marian Riordan, Deirde Smith
Italy	Alessandra Averna, Maranna Causin, Alessandra de Poli de Luigi, Camilla Patussi, Anna Roscio, Vittoria Valvassori
Netherlands	Christel Boeljon, Mariet van der Graaf, Kyra van Leeuwen, Joan van de Kraats, Dewi Claire Schreefel, Chrisje de Vries
Norway	Tonje Daffinrud, Marita Engzelius, Lene Krog, Caroline Martens, Lene H. Mørch, Amalie Valle
Scotland	Rachel Livingstone, Heather McRae, Emily Ogilvy, Roseanne Niven, Michele Thomson, Jenna Wilson
Slovenia	Pia-Zala Jenko, Teja Kikelj, Anja Kirn, Ursa Orehek, Tjasa Prelog, Tajda Sarkanj
Spain	Azahara Muñoz, Carlota Ciganda, Emma Cabrera-Bello, Araseli Felgueroso, Carmen Perez-Narbon, Belén Mozo
Sweden	Karin Kinnerud, Anna Nordqvist, Caroline Westrup, Pernilla Lindberg, Camilla Lennarth, Sara Wikström
Switzerland	Serafina Gutierrez, Melanie Mätzler, Stephanie Noser, Caroline Rominger, Natalia Tanno, Nina von Siebenthal
Wales	Tara Davies, Jo Nicholson, Lydia Hall, Becky Harris, Sahra Hassan, Breanne Loucks

== Winners ==
Defending champions Spain lead the opening 36-hole qualifying competition, with a score of 14 under par 706, 16 strokes ahead of team Sweden on second place.

Tied individual leaders in the 36-hole stroke-play competition was Emma Cabrera-Bello, Spain, and Anna Nordqvist, Sweden, each with a score of 8 under par 136

Team Spain won the championship, beating Sweden 5–2 in the final and earned their fourth title and third in a row. Team England earned third place, beating Germany 4–3 in the bronze match.

== Results ==
Qualification round

Team standings

Place	Country	Score	To par
1	Spain	349-358=706	−14
2	Sweden	357-365=722	+2
3	England	363-370=733	+13
4	Germany	359-375=734	+14
5	Italy	372-370=742	+22
6	Belgium	372-372=744	+24
7	Finland	379-372=751	+31
T8	Wales *	372-380=752	+32
T8	Scotland	371-381=752	+32
10	France	371-382=753	+33
11	Switzerland	378-377=755	+35
T12	Ireland *	369-390=759	+39
T12	Norway	385-374=759	+39
T14	Austria *	378-382=760	+40
T14	Netherlands	382-378=760	+40
16	Slovenia	403-391=794	+74

* Note: In the event of a tie the order was determined by the better total non-counting scores.

Individual leaders

Place	Player	Country	Score	To par
T1	Emma Cabrera-Bello	Spain	67-69=136	−8
T1	Anna Nordqvist	Sweden	64-72=136	−8
3	Carlota Ciganda	Spain	66-72=138	−6
T4	Elena Giraud	France	69-71=140	−4
T4	Azahara Muñoz	Spain	71-69=140	−4
T6	Rachel Bell	England	71-71=142	−2
T6	Sandra Gal	Germany	70-72=142	−2
T6	Jenna Wilson	Scotland	69-73=142	−2
T9	Laura Gonzalez Escallon	Belgium	72-72=144	E
T9	Sahra Hassan	Wales	70-74=144	E
T9	Mel Reid	England	71-73=144	E
T9	Benedicte Thompsin	Belgium	70-74=144	E

Note: There was no official award for the lowest individual score.

Flight A

Bracket

Quarter finals
Sweden	6
Finland	1
England	6.5
Belgium	1.5
Germany	5
Italy	2
Spain	5
Wales	2

Semi finals
Sweden	4
England	3
Spain	5
Germany	2

Final
Spain	5.5
Sweden	1.5
Bronze match
England	4
Germany	3

Elimination matches
Finland	3
Belgium	2
Italy	4.5
Wales	0.5

Match for 5th place
Italy	3.5
Finland	1.5
Match for 7th place
Wales	5
Belgium	0

Final games

Spain	Sweden
5.5	1.5
C. Ciganda / A. Munoz 6 & 5	K. Kinnerud / P. Lindberg
E. Cabrera / B. Mozo	A. Nordqvist / C. Westrup 3 & 1
Azahara Munoz 1 hole	Anna Nordqvist
Belén Mozo 3 & 2	Camilla Lennarth
Araceli Felgueroso 5 & 4	Pernilla Lindberg
Emma Cabrera Bello AS *	Karin Kinnerud AS *
Carlota Ciganda 4 & 3	Caroline Westrup

* Note: Game all square after 18 holes declared halved, since team match already decided.

Flight B

Bracket

Round 1
France	3
Netherlands	2
Austria	4
Switzerland	1
Ireland	3
Norway	2
Scotland	3.5
Slovenia	1.5

Round 2
France	3
Austria	2
Ireland	4
Scotland	1

Match for 9th place
France	3
Ireland	2
Match for 11th place
Scotland	3.5
Austria	1.5

Elimination matches
Netherlands	3
Switzerland	2
Slovenia	3.5
Norway	1.5

Match for 13th place
Netherlands	5
Slovenia	0
Match for 15th place
Switzerland	3
Norway	2

Final standings

Place	Country
1st place, gold medalist(s)	Spain
2nd place, silver medalist(s)	Sweden
3rd place, bronze medalist(s)	England
4	Germany
5	Italy
6	Finland
7	Wales
8	Belgium
9	France
10	Ireland
11	Scotland
12	Austria
13	Netherlands
14	Slovenia
15	Switzerland
16	Norway

== See also ==
- Espirito Santo Trophy – biennial world amateur team golf championship for women organized by the International Golf Federation.
- European Amateur Team Championship – European amateur team golf championship for men organised by the European Golf Association.
