= Annabel Dimmock =

English professional golfer (born 1996)

Personal information
- Nationality: England
- Born: 5 October 1996 (age 30) London, England
- Height: 5 ft 6 in (1.68 m)

Career
- Sport: Golf
- Turned professional: 2015
- Current tour: Ladies European Tour (joined 2016)
- Former tour: LET Access Series (joined 2015)
- Professional wins: 2

Number of wins by tour
- Ladies European Tour: 2

Best results in LPGA major championships
- Chevron Championship: DNP
- Women's PGA C'ship: DNP
- U.S. Women's Open: DNP
- Women's British Open: 69th: 2019
- Evian Championship: CUT: 2019

Annabel Dimmock (born 5 October 1996) is an English professional golfer and Ladies European Tour player. She won the 2019 Jabra Ladies Open and the Ladies Irish Open in 2024.

== Amateur career ==
Dimmock had a successful amateur career. In 2014, she won the Helen Holm Scottish Women's Open Championship, and the Sunningdale Foursomes with Steven Brown. She finished runner-up at the Welsh Women's Open Stroke Play Championship and the Spanish International Ladies Amateur Championship.

Dimmock was a member of the England Golf National Girl's squad and represented Europe in the 2014 Junior Ryder Cup, Great Britain and Ireland in the 2014 Curtis Cup, and Great Britain at the 2014 Summer Youth Olympics.

Dimmock left school at 16 and played amateur golf full-time for year while weighing up her options.

== Professional career ==
Dimmock turned professional in 2015 at age 18, and joined the LET Access Series. In 2016, she joined the Ladies European Tour where the best finish in her rookie season was a fifth in the Qatar Ladies Open, after heading into the final day two strokes off the lead.

Dimmock finished third at the 2017 Lalla Meryem Cup, before holding off French amateur Pauline Roussin-Bouchard to win her first Ladies European Tour title by one shot at the 2019 Jabra Ladies Open at Evian Resort Golf Club. With the win, she qualified for her first major, the 2019 Evian Championship. The week after she competed in the 2019 Women's British Open, where she made the cut.

In 2020, Dimmock finished third in the LET total driving distance ranking, and in 2021 she lost in a playoff to 17-year-old Pia Babnik at the Jabra Ladies Open.

Dimmock was in contention at the 2022 KPMG Women's Irish Open and finished in a tie for 4th, a stroke behind joining the playoff won by Klára Spilková.

== Personal life ==
Dimmock was formerly in a highly publicized relationship with English television personality Chris Hughes.

== Amateur wins ==
- 2014 Helen Holm Scottish Women's Open Championship, Sunningdale Foursomes (with Steven Brown)

== Professional wins (2) ==
=== Ladies European Tour (2) ===
No.	Date	Tournament	Winning score	To par	Margin of victory	Runner-up
1	25 May 2019	Jabra Ladies Open^	69-69-68=206	−7	1 stroke	(France) Pauline Roussin-Bouchard (a)
2	1 Sep 2024	KPMG Women's Irish Open	72-66-65-70=273	−19	Playoff	(France) Pauline Roussin-Bouchard

^Dual-ranking event with the LET Access Series

Ladies European Tour playoff record (1–1)

No.	Year	Tournament	Opponent	Result
1	2021	Jabra Ladies Open	(Slovenia) Pia Babnik	Lost to birdie on first extra hole
2	2024	KPMG Women's Irish Open	(France) Pauline Roussin-Bouchard	Won with par on second extra hole

== Results in LPGA majors ==
! Tournament	2019	2020	2021
Chevron Championship			
Women's PGA Championship			
U.S. Women's Open			
The Evian Championship	CUT	NT	
Women's British Open	T69		CUT

Did not play

CUT = missed the half-way cut
NT = no tournament
T = tied

== Team appearances ==
Amateur

- Women's Home Internationals (representing England): 2013
- Junior Ryder Cup (representing Europe): 2014
- Curtis Cup (representing Great Britain and Ireland): 2014

Professional

- The Queens (representing Europe): 2017
