= Emma Duggleby =

English golfer

Personal information
- Full name: Emma Victoria (Duggleby) Brown
- Nationality: England
- Born: 5 October 1971 (age 55)

Career
- Sport: Golf
- Status: Amateur

Emma Victoria (Duggleby) Brown (born 5 October 1971) is an English amateur golfer. She was born Emma Duggleby, her married name is Brown. She won the British Ladies Amateur Golf Championship in 1994 and played in three Curtis Cup matches, in 2000, 2002 and 2004.

== Early life and career ==
Emma was born to golfing parents. She began playing golf at the age of 12 and at 17 she had a handicap of 2 and soon reached scratch.

She had made little impact nationally when she was a surprise winner of her first important title, the 1994 British Ladies Amateur Golf Championship at Newport, Wales, where she defeated Cécilia Mourgue d'Algue 3 and 1 in the final. She reached the finals again in 2000 and 2001, losing to Rebecca Hudson (5 and 4) in 2000 and Marta Prieto (4 and 3) in 2001.

She won the International European Ladies Amateur Championship in 2000 and played in the Curtis Cup the same year, but suffered a wrist injury in 2001 and was unable to defend her European Amateur title.

She returned to golf in 2004 and won the Scottish Ladies Open Amateur Stroke Play Golf Championship at the Royal Troon Golf Club. In May 2005, she participated at both the English Amateur at Burnham & Berrow Golf Club and the Yorkshire Championship at Wakefield. In 2008, she won The Astor Salver, a 36-hole women's open tournament, which she had previously won in 2006. In 2015, she paired up with Carol Simpson to win the Aldwark Trophy. She has won the York Union Ladies title seven times (1996, 1997, 2007, 2008, 2013, 2014, 2015).

== Personal life ==
Besides golf, she also works at the Ganton Golf Club where she is assistant secretary. Married to Richard Brown and has a son, Jack

== Amateur wins ==
- 1994 British Ladies Amateur Golf Championship
- 1998 English Women's Strokeplay
- 2000 European Ladies Amateur Championship
- 2004 Scottish Women's Open Stroke Play Championship
- 2006 The Astor Salver
- 2008 The Astor Salver
- 2015 Aldwark Trophy (with Carol Simpson)
- 2022 Yorkshire Ladies County Championship

== Team appearances ==
- European Ladies' Team Championship (representing England): 1995, 1999, 2001, 2003, 2005, 2009
- Vagliano Trophy (representing Great Britain & Ireland): 1995, 2001, 2003 (winners)
- Curtis Cup (representing Great Britain & Ireland): 2000, 2002, 2004
- Espirito Santo Trophy (representing Great Britain & Ireland): 2002, 2004
