= Karen Margrethe Juul =

Danish golfer

Personal information
- Full name: Karen Margrethe Juul Hansen
- Nickname: KM
- Nationality: Denmark
- Born: 23 December 1975 (age 50) Esbjerg, Denmark

Career
- Sport: Golf
- Turned professional: 2001
- Former tour: Ladies European Tour (2002–2010)
- Professional wins: 2

Number of wins by tour
- Ladies European Tour: 1
- Other: 1

Best results in LPGA major championships
- Chevron Championship: DNP
- Women's PGA C'ship: DNP
- U.S. Women's Open: CUT: 2007
- du Maurier Classic: DNP
- Women's British Open: CUT: 2003, 2005, 2006, 2010

Achievements and awards
- Edith Cummings Munson Golf Award: 1997

Karen Margrethe Juul (born 23 December 1975) is a Danish professional golfer.

== Amateur career ==
Juul was born in Esbjerg, Denmark. She practically grew up on the golf course, her mother a national team player, and started training golf at 9 years old. Aged 14, she made her debut at the club's division team, and by 18 years old she participated in her first women's European Championship. The following year she won her first Danish championship in stroke play and two years after that, in 1997, won the Danish championships both in stroke and match play.

She won the 1997 Ladies' British Open Amateur Stroke Play Championship and finished seventh at the 1997 European Ladies Amateur Championship.

Juul was a member of the Danish National Team 8 years from 1994 to 2001.

== Professional career ==
In 2001, Juul finished second in the 2001 Q-School to qualify for the Ladies European Tour and turned professional. She went on to record nine top-10 finishes including top-5 finishes at the 2005 Wales Ladies Championship of Europe, 2006 Deutsche Bank Ladies Swiss Open and 2007 Ladies Scottish Open. In 2006, she held off a final-day challenge from Laura Davies and Trish Johnson to seal victory in the Nykredit Masters by four strokes, clinching her first Ladies European Tour title, after a closing 68 gave a 15-under-par total of 273. This was the culmination of her career and she finished tenth on the 2006 Order of Merit rankings.

In 2007 she represented Denmark at the Women's World Cup of Golf with Iben Tinning.

Juul retired from professional golf in December 2010.

== Amateur wins ==
- 1997 Ladies' British Open Amateur Stroke Play Championship
- 1998 Helen Holm Scottish Women's Open Championship

== Professional wins ==
=== Ladies European Tour wins (1) ===
- 2006 Nykredit Masters

=== Other wins (1) ===
- 2008 Ladies Mauritius Open

== Team appearances ==
Amateur

- European Girls' Team Championship (representing Denmark): 1993
- Espirito Santo Trophy (representing Denmark): 1996, 1998
- European Ladies' Team Championship (representing Denmark): 1995, 1997, 1999, 2001, 2003

Professional

- World Cup (representing Denmark): 2007
