= Fiona Brown (bridge) =

English bridge player

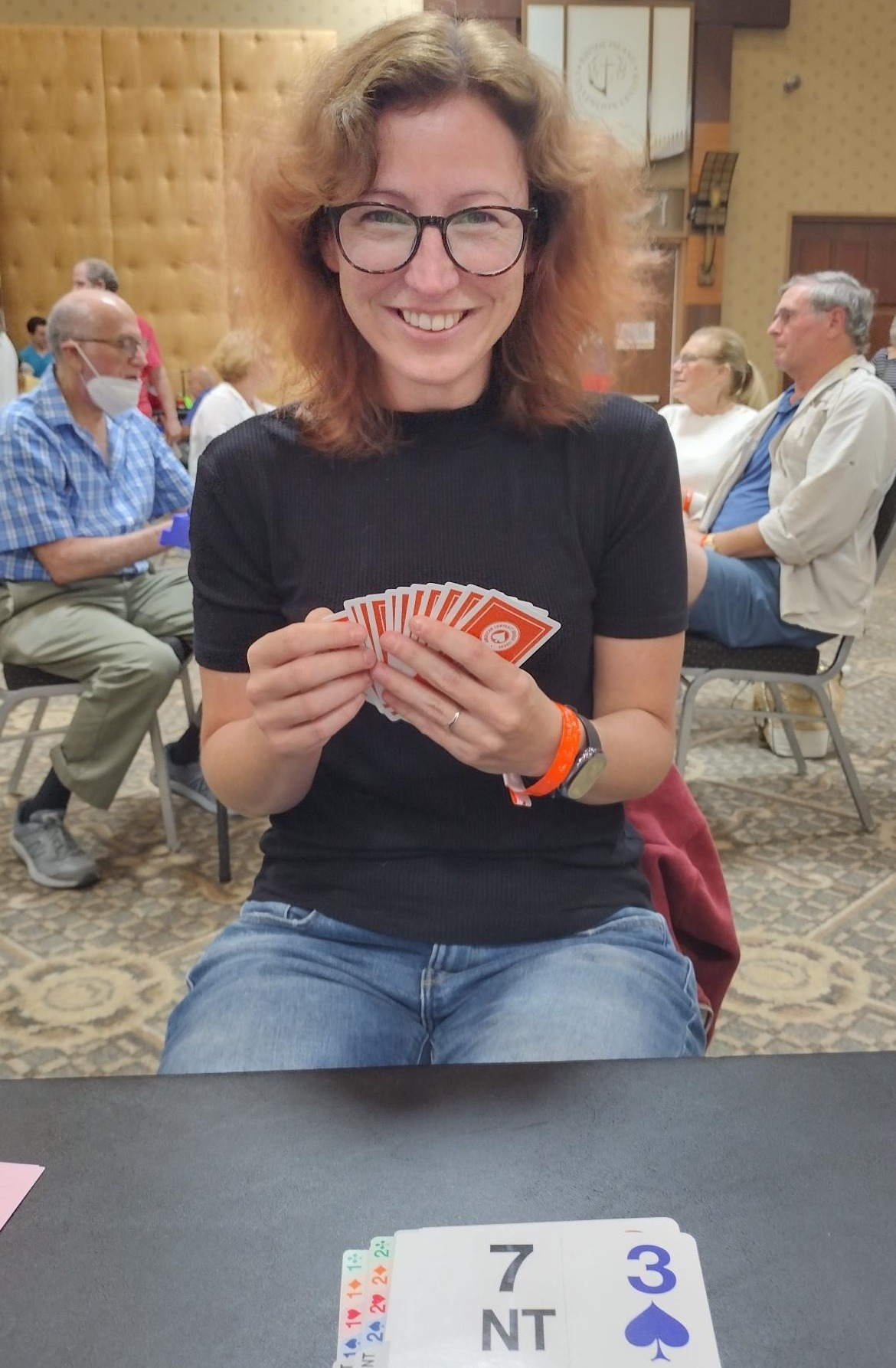
- Born: Fiona Brown; 1985 (age 39–40); Australia

Fiona Brown (born 1985) is a World and European champion bridge player.

== Bridge accomplishments ==
=== Wins ===
- European Women Teams Championship (2), 2012, 2016
- World Bridge Games (2), 2012, 2018

=== Runners-up ===
- Venice Cup (2), 2013, 2017
- European Women Teams Championship (1), 2014
