= Ganton Golf Club =

Golf course in North Yorkshire, England

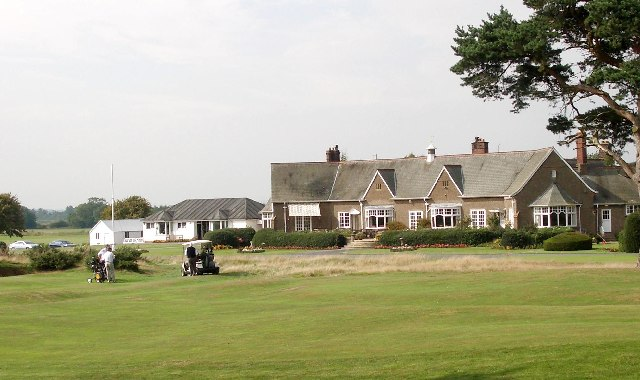
- The clubhouse and 18th green at Ganton

- Location in England Location in North Yorkshire
- 54.1882°N 0.4962°W

Club information
- Location: Ganton, North Yorkshire, England
- Established: 1891
- Type: Private
- Tota holes: 18
- Tournaments: Ryder Cup (1949); Curtis Cup (2000); Walker Cup (2003); News of the World Match Play; British PGA Championship; Amateur Championship (3); English Amateur (6); Brabazon Trophy (5)
- Website: gantongolfclub.com
- Designed by: Tom Chisholm
- Par: 71
- Length: 7,055 yards (6,451 m)
- Course rating: 74.7
- Slope rating: 138

Ganton Golf Club is a golf club in Ganton, North Yorkshire, England. It has an 18-hole golf course that has hosted many major tournaments, including the 1949 Ryder Cup.

Ganton has been widely rated as one of the best golf courses in England and one of the very best in Yorkshire. It has also been rated in the top-100 courses in the world by Golf Digest.

== History ==
Founded in 1891 as Scarborough Golf Club, the club's name was changed to Ganton Golf Club in 1907. The course at Ganton was originally designed by Tom Chisholm, assisted by Robert Bird, who became the club's first professional. Since then, modifications to the course have been made by a number of people, including James Braid, J. H. Taylor and Harry Vardon, Harry Colt, Alister MacKenzie, and Tom Simpson.

Vardon was the club's professional between 1896 and 1903; he was succeeded by Ted Ray, who remained at the club until 1912. Percy Adams, who, like Vardon and Ray, was also from Jersey, was the club's professional for a short time, before Arthur Day was appointed in 1913; he remained in post until his death in 1944. His successor was Jock Ballantine, who was appointed in early 1946. In 1950, Bill Branch succeeded Ballantine; he resigned in 1959.

== Competitions at Ganton ==
The course has been the venue for a number of notable amateur and professional competitions including the 1949 Ryder Cup, the News of the World Match Play (1953), the Sun Alliance PGA Championship (1981), the 2000 Curtis Cup, the 2003 Walker Cup and The Amateur Championship (1964, 1977, 1991), the English Amateur (1933, 1947, 1955, 1968, 1976, 2016 (Note: Ganton held the 2016 English Amateur in conjunction with South Cliff Golf Club, Scarborough.)) and the Brabazon Trophy (1952, 1960, 1987, 2006, 2021).

In 2017 it hosted the 128th Varsity Match between Oxford and Cambridge universities.
