= Rebecca Hudson =

English professional golfer (born 1979)

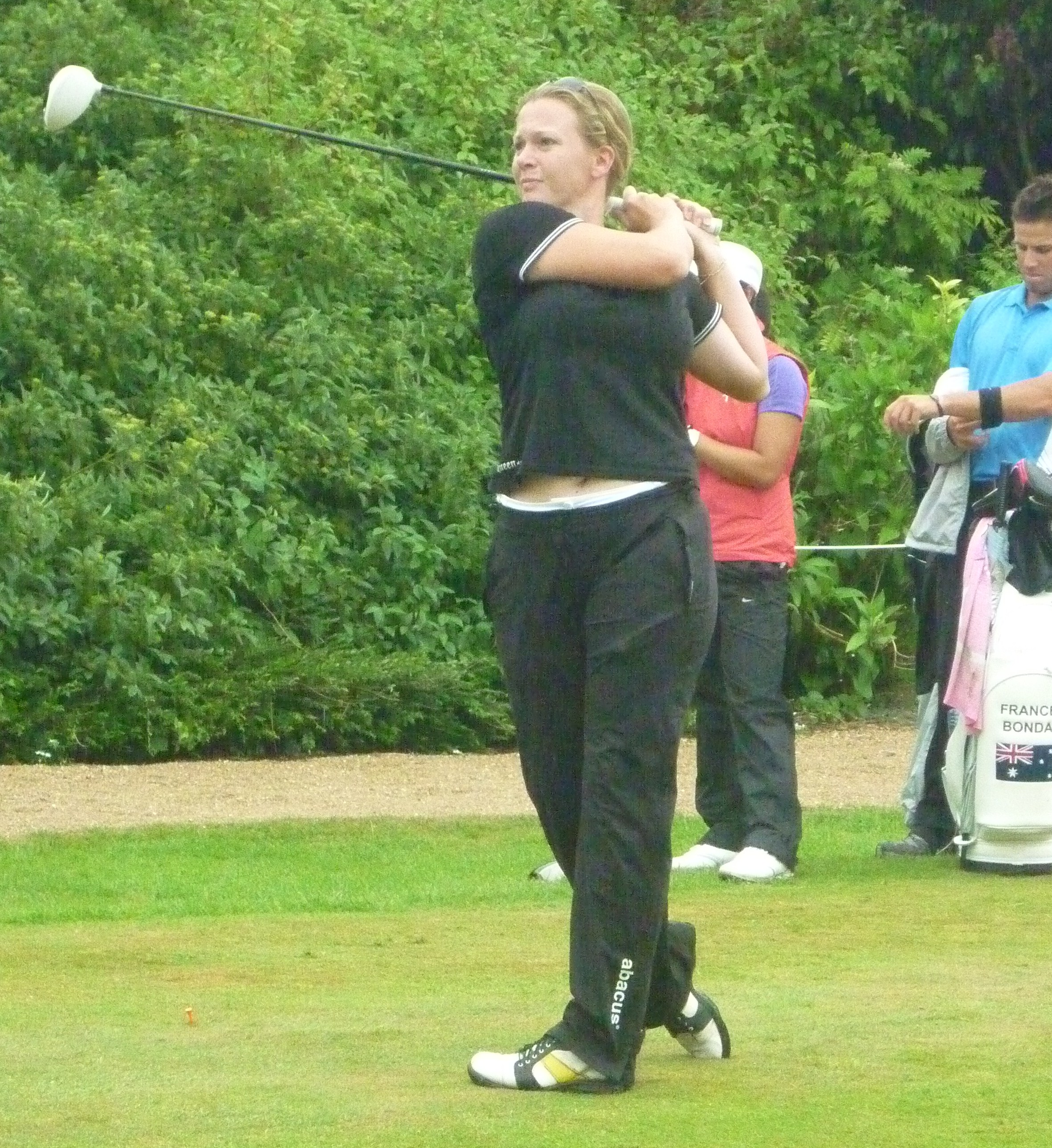

Personal information
- Full name: Rebecca Emma Gisela Hudson
- Nationality: England
- Born: 13 June 1979 (age 47) Doncaster, England
- Height: 1.70 m (5 ft 7 in)

Career
- Sport: Golf
- College: Doncaster College
- Turned professional: 2002
- Former tour: Ladies European Tour
- Professional wins: 7

Number of wins by tour
- Ladies European Tour: 4
- Other: 3

Best results in LPGA major championships
- Chevron Championship: DNP
- Women's PGA C'ship: DNP
- U.S. Women's Open: CUT: 2014
- Women's British Open: T32: 2001
- Evian Championship: DNP

Rebecca Emma Gisela Hudson (born 13 June 1979) is an English professional golfer who played on the Ladies European Tour.

== Amateur career ==
Hudson was born in Doncaster, England. She had a successful junior and amateur career. She was Yorkshire Girls Champion in 1994, Yorkshire Champion 1995, 1997 and 1998, English Girls Champion in 1995 and 1996 and won the Daily Telegraph Junior Golfer of the Year Award in 1994, 1995 and 1997. She also won the Joyce Wethered Award for the young player making the best effort at combining top level golf with education.

She was 1997 French under-21 champion, 2000 Spanish Ladies Amateur champion, 2000 Scottish strokeplay champion, 2000 English Women's Strokeplay champion, 2000 and 2002 British Ladies Amateur champion, 2000 British Amateur strokeplay champion and 2000 English strokeplay champion. In 2001, she won the English Women's Amateur Championship, was British Amateur strokeplay champion and winner of Smyth Salver for leading amateur at the Weetabix Women's British Open.

She won the 2000 Daily Telegraph Women's Golfer of the Year award, was a member of the Great Britain & Ireland Curtis Cup team in 1998, 2000 and 2002, and was a member of the Great Britain & Ireland 2000 Espirito Santo Trophy World Amateur Team Championship team.

== Professional career ==
Hudson turned professional in September 2002 and joined the Ladies European Tour with conditional status in 2003. She gained her first professional win at the 2006 Acer Women's SA Open on the Ladies African Tour, and won the 2006 Ladies African Tour Order of Merit. She won her first Ladies European Tour title at the Ladies Central European Open in 2006.

Hudson gained her second Ladies European Tour victory at the Euro 300,000 Tenerife Ladies Open 19–22 June 2008 and then her third at English Open at the Oxfordshire Golf Club the week after. She ended the season 10th on the New Star Money list, (the LET's official order of merit).

Also in 2008 she won the European Team Championship for England partnered with Trish Johnson.

== Professional wins (7) ==
=== Ladies European Tour wins (4) ===
- 2006 OTP Bank Ladies Central European Open
- 2008 Tenerife Ladies Open, Oxfordshire Ladies English Open, VCI European Ladies Golf Cup (with Trish Johnson)

=== Other wins (3) ===
- 2006 Acer SA Women's Open
- 2008 South African Masters
- 2018 Chase to Investec Cup

== Team appearances ==
Amateur

- European Ladies' Team Championship (representing England): 1997, 1999, 2001
- Vagliano Trophy (representing Great Britain & Ireland): 1997, 2001
- Curtis Cup (representing Great Britain & Ireland): 1998, 2000, 2002
- Espirito Santo Trophy (representing Great Britain & Ireland): 2000
- Commonwealth Trophy (representing Great Britain): 1999
