= Becky Morgan =

Welsh professional golfer

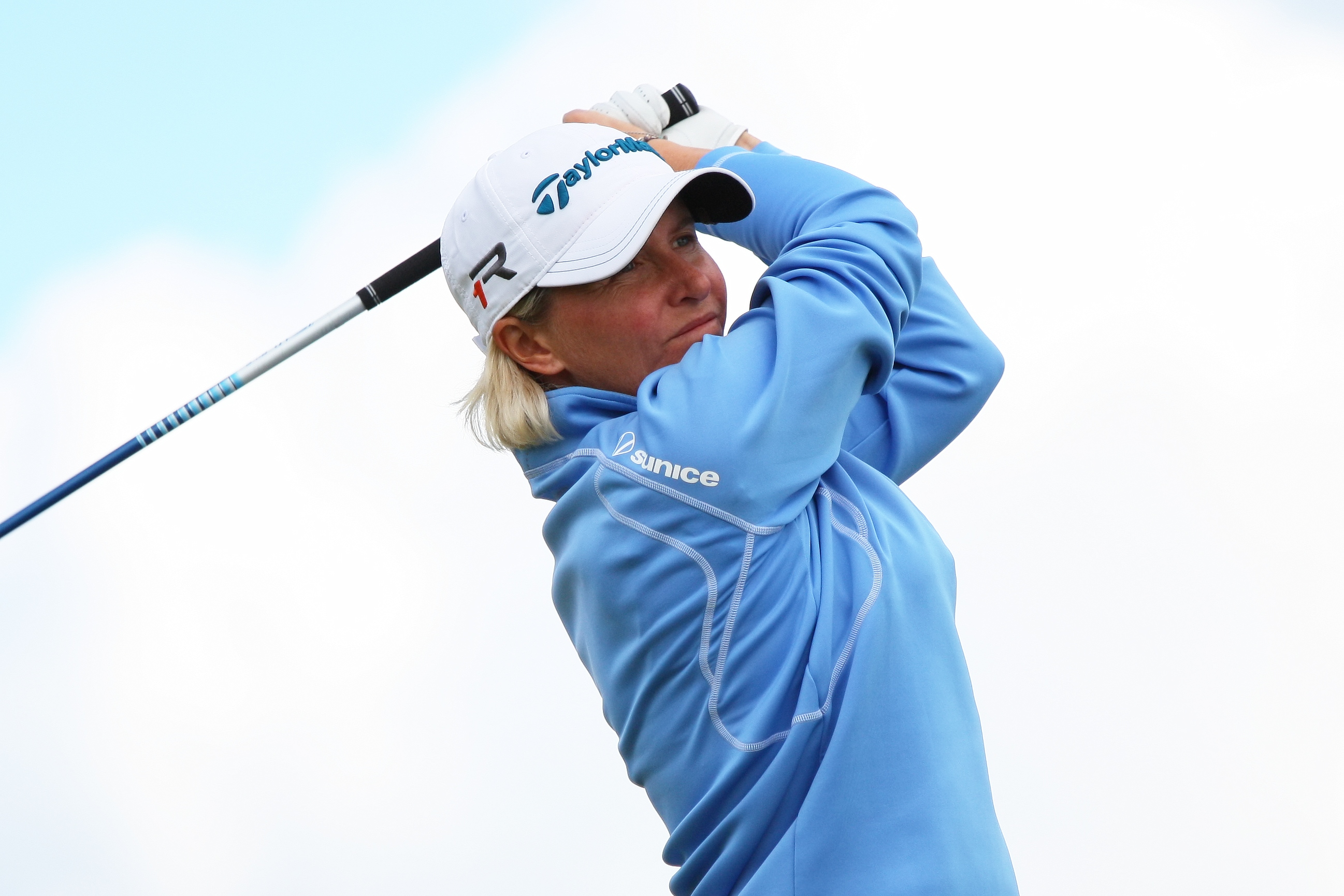
- Morgan at the 2013 Women's British Open

Personal information
- Nationality: Wales
- Born: 5 September 1974 (age 52) Abergavenny, Wales
- Height: 5 ft 2 in (1.57 m)
- Spouse: Emma Dodds (m. 2023)

Career
- Sport: Golf
- College: University of North Carolina at Greensboro
- Turned professional: 2000
- Current tours: LPGA Tour (joined 2001); Ladies European Tour (joined 2001)
- Professional wins: 1

Number of wins by tour
- Ladies European Tour: 1

Best results in LPGA major championships
- Chevron Championship: T29: 2006
- Women's PGA C'ship: T6: 2003
- U.S. Women's Open: T28: 2006
- Women's British Open: T15: 2005
- Evian Championship: CUT: 2013, 2019

Becky Morgan (born 5 September 1974) is a Welsh professional golfer who plays mainly on the U.S.-based LPGA Tour but is also a member of the Ladies European Tour.

== Amateur career ==
Morgan was born in Abergavenny. She was introduced to the game of golf by her grandfather when she was 12 and had a successful amateur career. She was a member of the Welsh Junior and Under-21 teams and also won the 1991 and 1992 Welsh School Championship titles. She was a member of the Great Britain and Ireland Curtis Cup team in 1998 and 2000 and a member of the Vagliano Trophy team in 1997 and 1999. Morgan was the runner-up in 1996 and a semifinalist in 1997 at the British Amateur Championship. She was runner-up in the 1998 Ladies' British Open Amateur Stroke Play Championship.

Morgan was assisted by College Prospects of America to win a golf scholarship at the University of North Carolina at Greensboro in 1994, and during the next four years won 10 NCAA Division I medalist titles, including three Big South Conference Championships from 1995 to 1997 resulting in her being named Big South All-American for those three years. She finished 10th in the NCAA Championship in 1997, the year she graduated with a major in Geography.

Morgan returned to Wales and continued her amateur career finishing runner-up at the Welsh Ladies' Amateur Championship in 1998 and 1999 and second at the South Atlantic Amateur Championship in 2000.

== Professional career ==
Morgan turned professional in August 2000. She qualified for the Ladies European Tour by finishing tied for sixth at the LET Qualifying School and earned non-exempt status on the LPGA Tour by finishing T14th at the LPGA Final Qualifying Tournament and thus had rookie seasons on both sides of the Atlantic in 2001.

Morgan played in eight events on LET in 2001 without missing a cut, posting four top-10s including narrowly losing the French Open to Norway's Suzann Pettersen at the third playoff hole. She also played 16 events on the LPGA earning her first LPGA top-10 finish with a tie for 7th at the Longs Drugs Challenge. She finished second to Hee-Won Han for Louise Suggs Rolex Rookie of the Year honours.

In 2002, Morgan competed in four events on the Evian Ladies European Tour, where she posted two top-10 finishes. She also played 18 events on the LPGA with a T7 at the ShopRite LPGA Classic being her only top-10 finish. In 2003, she finished second at the ShopRite LPGA Classic, the best LPGA finish of her career and in 23 starts had seven top-10s. She played in six events on the LET with her best finish being a tie for fourth at the HP Open. She narrowly missed out on a captain's pick for the 2003 Solheim Cup.

In 2004, Morgan played most of the year on the LPGA. In 24 starts, she amassed three top-10s. She also played in four events on the LET with her best finish being 3rd at the HP Open in Sweden. She also concentrated on the LPGA for 2005 and recorded one top-10 out of 23 events played. Her best performance on the LET was a tie for sixth on home soil at the Wales Ladies Championship.

Morgan teamed up with Becky Brewerton to finish 6th in the inaugural Women's World Cup of Golf in 2005. They teamed up again in 2006 when they finished third and 2007 when they finished eighth.

Morgan won her first professional tournament at the 2018 Hero Women's Indian Open on the Ladies European Tour.

== Personal life ==
Morgan is a lesbian. She announced her engagement to Scottish sports presenter Emma Dodds in September 2020 and they were married in a humanist ceremony in Loch Lomond in August 2023.

== Ladies European Tour wins ==
- 2018 Hero Women's Indian Open

== LPGA Tour career summary ==
Year	Wins	Earnings ($)	Money list rank	Average
2001	0	101,955	83	72.07
2002	0	102,290	80	72.70
2003	0	481,344	23	71.31
2004	0	422,696	29	71.33
2005	0	129,681	70	73.33
2006	0	177,591	67	73.01
2007	0	235,653	55	73.08
2008	0	205,838	65	72.70
2009	0	158,113	65	72.84
2010	0	76,007	83	73.44
2011	0	98,485	69	73.57
2012	0	111,725	74	73.27
2013	0	64,593	96	72.96
2014	0	68,760	102	72.48
2015	0	38,997	120	72.54
2016	0	82,459	102	72.02
2017	0	62,753	124	73.00
2018	0	11,786	157	72.84
2019	0	0	–	74.20
2020	0	11,635	148	74.50
2021	0	6,584	174	72.50
2022	0	10,201	182	72.33

- As of the 2022 season

== Team appearances ==
Amateur

- European Ladies' Team Championship (representing Wales): 1995, 1997, 1999
- Vagliano Trophy (representing Great Britain & Ireland): 1997, 1999
- Curtis Cup (representing Great Britain & Ireland): 1998, 2000
- Commonwealth Trophy (representing Great Britain): 1999

Professional

- World Cup (representing Wales): 2005, 2006, 2007, 2008
- The Queens (representing Europe): 2016
