= List of Solheim Cup records =

The Solheim Cup is a biennial women's golf competition between teams from Europe and the United States. The first Solheim Cup took place in 1990.

For details of individual players' complete Solheim Cup records see: List of European Solheim Cup golfers and List of American Solheim Cup golfers.

== Summary ==
There have been a total of 528 individual matches played in the 20 Solheim Cups.

Team	Overall	Singles	Foursomes	Fourballs
United States won	234	106	63	60
Europe won	218	81	69	61
Halved	76	33	17	26
United States points	272	127.5	71.5	73
Europe points	256	104.5	77.5	74
Total	528	232	149	147

== Holes-in-one ==
=== Europe ===
Hole	Player	Match	Type	Year
17th at Colorado Golf Club	Anna Nordqvist	Anna Nordqvist & Caroline Hedwall won 2 & 1 v Morgan Pressel & Jessica Korda	Foursomes	2013
12th at Finca Cortesín	Emily Kristine Pedersen	Emily Kristine Pedersen & Maja Stark halved v Jennifer Kupcho & Allisen Corpuz	Fourball	2023

=== United States ===
None

== Largest margins of victory in a match ==
All victories by 5 or more holes are listed.

=== Europe ===
Margin	Winner	Loser	Type	Year
6 & 5	Laura Davies & Trish Johnson	Kelly Robbins & Pat Bradley	Fourball	1996
6 & 5	Laura Davies & Lisa Hackney	Beth Daniel & Val Skinner	Fourball	1996
6 & 5	Lisa Hackney	Betsy King	Singles	1998
6 & 5	Caroline Hedwall & Sophie Gustafson	Angela Stanford & Stacy Lewis	Foursomes	2011
6 & 5	Catriona Matthew	Paula Creamer	Singles	2011
6 & 5	Anna Nordqvist & Madelene Sagström	Alison Lee & Lexi Thompson	Fourball	2024

In 2011 Cristie Kerr conceded her match against Karen Stupples at the start, because of injury, resulting in a 10 & 8 defeat.

=== United States ===
Margin	Winner	Loser	Type	Year
8 & 7	Pat Bradley	Trish Johnson	Singles	1990
7 & 6	Beth Daniel	Liselotte Neumann	Singles	1990
7 & 6	Deb Richard	Kitrina Douglas	Singles	1992
7 & 5	Pat Hurst & Rosie Jones	Lisa Hackney & Sophie Gustafson	Fourball	1998
7 & 5	Paula Creamer	Laura Davies	Singles	2005
7 & 5	Ally McDonald & Angel Yin	Anna Nordqvist & Caroline Hedwall	Fourball	2019
6 & 5	Cathy Gerring & Dottie Mochrie	Pam Wright & Liselotte Neumann	Foursomes	1990
6 & 5	Patty Sheehan & Rosie Jones	Dale Reid & Helen Alfredsson	Foursomes	1990
6 & 5	Beth Daniel & Meg Mallon	Annika Sörenstam & Catrin Nilsmark	Fourball	1994
6 & 5	Dottie Mochrie	Catrin Nilsmark	Singles	1994
6 & 5	Rosie Jones & Becky Iverson	Laura Davies & Alison Nicholas	Foursomes	2000
6 & 5	Laura Diaz	Iben Tinning	Singles	2005
6 & 5	Brittany Lang	Sandra Gal	Singles	2011
6 & 5	Angel Yin & Lizette Salas	Carlota Ciganda & Emily Kristine Pedersen	Fourball	2017
6 & 5	Jessica Korda & Nelly Korda	Carlota Ciganda & Bronte Law	Foursomes	2019
6 & 5	Megan Khang	Emily Kristine Pedersen	Singles	2024
6 & 5	Alison Lee & Lauren Coughlin	Charley Hull & Lottie Woad	Foursomes	2026

== Point streaks ==
=== Winning streaks ===
Players who won 5 or more consecutive matches.

==== Europe ====
Player	Matches won	First year	Last year	Foursomes record W–L–H	Fourball record W–L–H	Singles record W–L–H
Carin Koch	7	2000	2002	3–0–0	3–0–0	1–0–0
Caroline Hedwall	6	2013	2015	2–0–0	3–0–0	1–0–0
Charley Hull	6	2013	2015	2–0–0	3–0–0	1–0–0
Laura Davies	5	1990	1994	2–0–0	1–0–0	2–0–0
Annika Sörenstam	5	2003	2005	2–0–0	2–0–0	1–0–0

==== United States ====
Player	Matches won	First year	Last year	Foursomes record W–L–H	Fourball record W–L–H	Singles record W–L–H
Morgan Pressel	7	2009	2013	3–0–0	2–0–0	2–0–0
Megan Khang	6	2023	2026	1–0–0	3–0–0	2–0–0
Dottie Pepper	5	1994	1996	2–0–0	2–0–0	1–0–0
Dottie Pepper	5	1996	1998	2–0–0	1–0–0	2–0–0

=== Unbeaten streaks ===
Players who went 7 or more consecutive matches unbeaten.

==== Europe ====
Player	Matches unbeaten	Points	First year	Last year	Foursomes record W–L–H	Fourball record W–L–H	Singles record W–L–H
Carin Koch	9	8	2000	2003	3–0–1	3–0–0	1–0–1
Caroline Hedwall	7	6.5	2011	2015	2–0–0	3–0–0	1–0–1
Suzann Pettersen	7	5	2005	2007	1–0–2	2–0–1	0–0–1

==== United States ====
Player	Matches unbeaten	Points	First year	Last year	Foursomes record W–L–H	Fourball record W–L–H	Singles record W–L–H
Paula Creamer	10	8.5	2005	2009	3–0–1	2–0–2	2–0–0
Morgan Pressel	9	8.5	2007	2013	3–0–0	2–0–1	3–0–0
Megan Khang	9	8.5	2021	2026	2–0–0	3–0–1	3–0–0
Cristie Kerr	9	7.5	2013	2017	2–0–1	2–0–1	2–0–1
Lexi Thompson	9	7	2013	2017	2–0–1	2–0–1	1–0–2
Lauren Coughlin	7	6	2024	2026	4–0–0	1–0–1	0–0–1
Meg Mallon	7	5.5	1994	1998	1–0–1	1–0–2	2–0–0
Juli Inkster	7	5.5	2005	2007	2–0–1	0–0–2	2–0–0

== Pairings ==
=== Most frequent pairings ===
Pairings used 6 or more times are listed.

==== Europe ====
Pairing	Number	Points	First year	Last year	Overall record W–L–H	Foursomes record W–L–H	Fourball record W–L–H
Laura Davies & Alison Nicholas	9	5	1990	2000	5–4–0	4–2–0	1–2–0
Sophie Gustafson & Suzann Pettersen	7	3.5	2003	2011	2–2–3	2–1–2	0–1–1
Helen Alfredsson & Liselotte Neumann	6	2.5	1992	2000	2–3–1	1–3–0	1–0–1
Catrin Nilsmark & Annika Sörenstam	6	3.5	1994	1998	3–2–1	2–0–1	1–2–0
Catriona Matthew & Annika Sörenstam	6	3	1998	2007	3–3–0	2–3–0	1–0–0
Caroline Hedwall & Anna Nordqvist	6	3	2013	2023	3–3–0	2–1–0	1–2–0
Céline Boutier & Georgia Hall	6	3.5	2019	2023	3–2–1	2–2–1	1–0–0

==== United States ====
Pairing	Number	Points	First year	Last year	Overall record W–L–H	Foursomes record W–L–H	Fourball record W–L–H
Brandie Burton & Dottie Pepper	6	4.5	1994	2000	4–1–1	2–1–0	2–0–1
Beth Daniel & Meg Mallon	6	2	1994	2000	1–3–2	0–3–0	1–0–2
Pat Hurst & Kelly Robbins	6	4	1998	2002	4–2–0	3–2–0	1–0–0
Paula Creamer & Juli Inkster	6	3.5	2005	2009	3–2–1	3–1–1	0–1–0
Cristie Kerr & Lexi Thompson	6	5	2015	2017	4–0–2	2–0–1	2–0–1
Nelly Korda & Allisen Corpuz	6	5	2023	2026	5–1–0	5–1–0	0–0–0

== Age-related records ==
The ages given are on the first day of the Solheim Cup. Generally the leading 5 in each category are given.

=== Youngest players ===
==== Europe ====
Age	Player	Year	Date of birth	Date of play
17 years, 149 days	Charley Hull	2013	20 March 1996	16 August 2013
19 years, 182 days	Charley Hull	2015	20 March 1996	18 September 2015
21 years, 128 days	Georgia Hall	2017	12 April 1996	18 August 2017
21 years, 151 days	Charley Hull	2017	20 March 1996	18 August 2017
21 years, 164 days	Emily Kristine Pedersen	2017	7 March 1996	18 August 2017

==== United States ====
Age	Player	Year	Date of birth	Date of play
18 years, 187 days	Lexi Thompson	2013	10 February 1995	16 August 2013
18 years, 319 days	Angel Yin	2017	3 October 1998	18 August 2017
19 years, 35 days	Paula Creamer	2005	5 August 1986	9 September 2005
19 years, 114 days	Morgan Pressel	2007	23 May 1988	14 September 2007
19 years, 314 days	Michelle Wie	2009	11 October 1989	21 August 2009

=== Oldest players ===
==== Europe ====
Age	Player	Year	Date of birth	Date of play
47 years, 358 days	Catriona Matthew	2017	25 August 1969	18 August 2017
47 years, 353 days	Laura Davies	2011	5 October 1963	23 September 2011
46 years, 24 days	Catriona Matthew	2015	25 August 1969	18 September 2015
45 years, 320 days	Laura Davies	2009	5 October 1963	21 August 2009
44 years, 134 days	Helen Alfredsson	2009	9 April 1965	21 August 2009

The oldest rookie was Giulia Sergas in 2013 who was 33 years, 233 days.

==== United States ====
Age	Player	Year	Date of birth	Date of play
51 years, 91 days	Juli Inkster	2011	24 June 1960	23 September 2011
49 years, 58 days	Juli Inkster	2009	24 June 1960	21 August 2009
48 years, 330 days	Beth Daniel	2005	14 October 1956	9 September 2005
47 years, 82 days	Juli Inkster	2007	24 June 1960	14 September 2007
46 years, 333 days	Beth Daniel	2003	14 October 1956	12 September 2003

The oldest rookie was Christa Johnson in 1998 who was 40 years, 146 days.

=== Captains ===
- Youngest Solheim Cup captain: Catrin Nilsmark – 36 years, 13 days in 2003
- Youngest United States captain: Stacy Lewis – 38 years, 218 days in 2023
- Oldest Solheim Cup captain: Juli Inkster – 59 years, 81 days in 2019
- Oldest European captain: Catriona Matthew – 52 years, 10 days in 2021
