= List of European Solheim Cup golfers =

This is a list of all the golfers who represented Europe in the Solheim Cup from the first staging in 1990 through to 2026.

== Players ==
Player	Editions
(Sweden) Helen Alfredsson	1990, 1992, 1994, 1996, 1998, 2000, 2002, 2009
(Netherlands) Christel Boeljon	2011
(France) Céline Boutier	2019, 2021, 2023, 2024, 2026
(Wales) Becky Brewerton	2007, 2009
(Spain) Raquel Carriedo	2000, 2002
(Finland) Matilda Castren	2021
(Spain) Carlota Ciganda	2013, 2015, 2017, 2019, 2021, 2023, 2024, 2026
(England) Laura Davies	1990, 1992, 1994, 1996, 1998, 2000, 2002, 2003, 2005, 2007, 2009, 2011
(France) Marie-Laure de Lorenzi	1990, 1996, 1998
(Belgium) Florence Descampe	1992
(England) Kitrina Douglas	1992
(Scotland) Gemma Dryburgh	2023
(Spain) Tania Elósegui	2009
(Germany) Elisabeth Esterl	2003
(England) Jodi Ewart Shadoff	2013, 2017, 2019
(England) Lora Fairclough	1994
(Germany) Sandra Gal	2011, 2015
(Sweden) Linn Grant	2023, 2024, 2026
(Sweden) Sophie Gustafson	1998, 2000, 2002, 2003, 2005, 2007, 2009, 2011
(England) Lisa Hackney*	1996, 1998
(England) Georgia Hall	2017, 2019, 2021, 2023, 2024
(Germany) Bettina Hauert	2007
(Sweden) Caroline Hedwall	2011, 2013, 2015, 2019, 2023
(Germany) Esther Henseleit	2024, 2026
(Sweden) Maria Hjorth	2002, 2005, 2007, 2009, 2011
(England) Charley Hull	2013, 2015, 2017, 2019, 2021, 2023, 2024, 2026
(France) Karine Icher	2002, 2013, 2015, 2017
(England) Trish Johnson	1990, 1992, 1994, 1996, 1998, 2000, 2005, 2007
(Sweden) Carin Koch	2000, 2002, 2003, 2005
(France) Ludivine Kreutz	2005
(England) Bronte Law	2019
(Spain) Julia López Ramírez	2026
(Italy) Diana Luna	2009
(Denmark) Nanna Koerstz Madsen	2021, 2026
(Republic of Ireland) Leona Maguire	2021, 2023, 2024, 2026
(Scotland) Kathryn Marshall*	1996
(Spain) Paula Martí	2002
(Germany) Caroline Masson	2013, 2015, 2017, 2019
(Scotland) Catriona Matthew	1998, 2003, 2005, 2007, 2009, 2011, 2013, 2015, 2017
(Scotland) Mhairi McKay	2002, 2003
(France) Patricia Meunier-Lebouc	2000, 2003
(Scotland) Janice Moodie	2000, 2003, 2009
(England) Joanne Morley	1996
(Spain) Azahara Muñoz	2011, 2013, 2015, 2019
(France) Nastasia Nadaud	2026
(Sweden) Liselotte Neumann	1990, 1992, 1994, 1996, 1998, 2000
(England) Alison Nicholas	1990, 1992, 1994, 1996, 1998, 2000
(Sweden) Catrin Nilsmark	1992, 1994, 1996, 1998, 2000
(France) Gwladys Nocera	2005, 2007, 2009, 2015
(Sweden) Anna Nordqvist	2009, 2011, 2013, 2015, 2017, 2019, 2021, 2023, 2024
(England) Florentyna Parker	2017
(Denmark) Emily Kristine Pedersen	2017, 2021, 2023, 2024
(Norway) Suzann Pettersen	2002, 2003, 2005, 2007, 2009, 2011, 2013, 2015, 2017+, 2019
(Germany) Sophia Popov	2021
(Spain) Beatriz Recari	2013
(Scotland) Dale Reid	1990, 1992, 1994, 1996
(England) Melissa Reid	2011, 2015, 2017, 2021
(England) Mimi Rhodes	2026
(Sweden) Madelene Sagström	2017, 2021, 2023, 2024
(Spain) Ana Belén Sánchez	2003
(Italy) Giulia Sergas	2013
(Sweden) Annika Sörenstam	1994, 1996, 1998, 2000, 2002, 2003, 2005, 2007
(Sweden) Charlotta Sörenstam	1998
(Sweden) Maja Stark	2023, 2024, 2026
(England) Karen Stupples	2005, 2011
(Denmark) Iben Tinning	2002, 2003, 2005, 2007
(Netherlands) Anne van Dam	2019
(Switzerland) Albane Valenzuela	2024
(Sweden) Linda Wessberg	2007
(England) Lottie Woad	2026
(Scotland) Pam Wright	1990, 1992, 1994

+ Selected or qualified for the team but withdrew and was replaced.
* Lisa Hackney later became Lisa Hall. Kathryn Marshall later became Kathryn Imrie.

== Playing record ==
O = Overall, S = Singles matches, Fs = Foursome matches, Fb = Fourball matches
W = Matches won, L = Matches lost, H = Matches halved

Cty	Player	First year	Last year	Solheim Cups	Matches	Points	Winning percentage	O W	O L	O H	S W	S L	S H	Fs W	Fs L	Fs H	Fb W	Fb L	Fb H
(Sweden)	Helen Alfredsson	1990	2009	8	28	12	42.86%	11	15	2	4	4	0	3	8	0	4	3	2
(Netherlands)	Christel Boeljon	2011	2011	1	3	1	33.33%	1	2	0	1	0	0	0	1	0	0	1	0
(France)	Céline Boutier	2019	2026	5	18	7.5	41.67%	7	10	1	3	2	0	3	4	1	1	4	0
(Wales)	Becky Brewerton	2007	2009	2	7	3.5	50.00%	3	3	1	0	1	1	2	1	0	1	1	0
(Spain)	Raquel Carriedo	2000	2002	2	5	1.5	30.00%	1	3	1	0	2	0	0	1	0	1	0	1
(Finland)	Matilda Castren	2021	2021	1	4	3	75.00%	3	1	0	1	0	0	1	1	0	1	0	0
(Spain)	Carlota Ciganda	2013	2026	8	30	15.5	51.67%	13	12	5	5	2	1	2	4	1	6	6	3
(England)	Laura Davies	1990	2011	12	46	25	54.35%	22	18	6	5	5	2	8	6	1	9	7	3
(France)	Marie-Laure de Lorenzi	1990	1998	3	11	3	27.27%	3	8	0	1	2	0	1	3	0	1	3	0
(Belgium)	Florence Descampe	1992	1992	1	3	0.5	16.67%	0	2	1	0	1	0	0	1	0	0	0	1
(England)	Kitrina Douglas	1992	1992	1	1	0	0.00%	0	1	0	0	1	0	0	0	0	0	0	0
(Scotland)	Gemma Dryburgh	2023	2023	1	2	1	50.00%	0	0	2	0	0	1	0	0	0	0	0	1
(Spain)	Tania Elósegui	2009	2009	1	3	1	33.33%	1	2	0	0	1	0	0	0	0	1	1	0
(Germany)	Elisabeth Esterl	2003	2003	1	3	1.5	50.00%	1	1	1	0	1	0	1	0	1	0	0	0
(England)	Jodi Ewart Shadoff	2013	2019	3	10	3.5	35.00%	3	6	1	1	2	0	0	3	0	2	1	1
(England)	Lora Fairclough	1994	1994	1	3	2	66.67%	2	1	0	0	1	0	1	0	0	1	0	0
(Germany)	Sandra Gal	2011	2015	2	7	3	42.86%	2	3	2	0	2	0	2	0	0	0	1	2
(Sweden)	Linn Grant	2023	2026	3	13	7	53.85%	7	6	0	1	2	0	3	2	0	3	2	0
(Sweden)	Sophie Gustafson	1998	2011	8	31	16	51.61%	13	12	6	3	4	1	7	1	4	3	7	1
(England)	Lisa Hackney	1996	1998	2	6	3	50.00%	3	3	0	1	1	0	0	1	0	2	1	0
(England)	Georgia Hall	2017	2024	5	21	11	52.38%	10	9	2	2	2	1	4	4	1	4	3	0
(Germany)	Bettina Hauert	2007	2007	1	2	0	0.00%	0	2	0	0	1	0	0	1	0	0	0	0
(Sweden)	Caroline Hedwall	2011	2023	5	17	9.5	55.88%	9	7	1	2	2	1	3	1	0	4	4	0
(Germany)	Esther Henseleit	2024	2026	2	6	3.5	58.33%	3	2	1	0	1	1	3	1	0	0	0	0
(Sweden)	Maria Hjorth	2002	2011	5	21	8.5	40.48%	6	10	5	0	4	1	4	3	1	2	3	3
(England)	Charley Hull	2013	2026	8	32	18	56.25%	16	12	4	4	3	1	6	5	1	6	4	2
(France)	Karine Icher	2002	2017	4	14	8	57.14%	7	5	2	1	1	2	3	2	0	3	2	0
(England)	Trish Johnson	1990	2007	8	25	8.5	34.00%	5	13	7	1	7	0	2	4	2	2	2	5
(Sweden)	Carin Koch	2000	2005	4	16	11.5	71.88%	10	3	3	2	1	1	5	0	2	3	2	0
(France)	Ludivine Kreutz	2005	2005	1	2	0	0.00%	0	2	0	0	1	0	0	1	0	0	0	0
(England)	Bronte Law	2019	2019	1	4	2	50.00%	1	1	2	1	0	0	0	1	1	0	0	1
(Spain)	Julia López Ramírez	2026	2026	1	2	1.5	75.00%	1	0	1	1	0	0	0	0	0	0	0	1
(Italy)	Diana Luna	2009	2009	1	2	1.5	75.00%	1	0	1	1	0	0	0	0	0	0	0	1
(Denmark)	Nanna Koerstz Madsen	2021	2026	2	6	2.5	41.67%	2	3	1	1	0	1	0	1	0	1	2	0
(Republic of Ireland)	Leona Maguire	2021	2026	4	16	10.5	65.63%	10	5	1	3	1	0	4	2	0	3	2	1
(Scotland)	Kathryn Marshall	1996	1996	1	3	1.5	50.00%	1	1	1	0	1	0	0	0	1	1	0	0
(Spain)	Paula Martí	2002	2002	1	4	1	25.00%	1	3	0	0	1	0	1	1	0	0	1	0
(Germany)	Caroline Masson	2013	2019	4	14	4.5	32.14%	3	8	3	1	3	0	0	3	1	2	2	2
(Scotland)	Catriona Matthew	1998	2017	9	37	22	59.46%	18	11	8	6	2	1	8	5	4	4	4	3
(Scotland)	Mhairi McKay	2002	2003	2	5	2	40.00%	2	3	0	1	1	0	0	1	0	1	1	0
(France)	Patricia Meunier-Lebouc	2000	2003	2	4	2.5	62.50%	2	1	1	1	1	0	0	0	0	1	0	1
(Scotland)	Janice Moodie	2000	2009	3	11	8	72.73%	7	2	2	2	0	1	4	1	1	1	1	0
(England)	Joanne Morley	1996	1996	1	2	0	0.00%	0	2	0	0	1	0	0	0	0	0	1	0
(Spain)	Azahara Muñoz	2011	2019	4	16	7	43.75%	6	8	2	1	3	0	4	2	1	1	3	1
(France)	Nastasia Nadaud	2026	2026	1	4	3	75.00%	3	1	0	1	0	0	1	0	0	1	1	0
(Sweden)	Liselotte Neumann	1990	2000	6	21	8.5	40.48%	6	10	5	2	2	2	1	6	1	3	2	2
(England)	Alison Nicholas	1990	2000	6	18	8.5	47.22%	7	8	3	1	3	2	4	3	0	2	2	1
(Sweden)	Catrin Nilsmark	1992	2000	5	16	8.5	53.13%	8	7	1	2	3	0	3	1	1	3	3	0
(France)	Gwladys Nocera	2005	2015	4	12	7	58.33%	6	4	2	1	2	1	3	1	1	2	1	0
(Sweden)	Anna Nordqvist	2009	2024	9	35	18.5	52.86%	17	15	3	3	3	3	8	8	0	6	4	0
(England)	Florentyna Parker	2017	2017	1	2	0	0.00%	0	2	0	0	1	0	0	0	0	0	1	0
(Denmark)	Emily Kristine Pedersen	2017	2024	4	17	7.5	44.12%	7	9	1	1	3	0	3	4	0	3	2	1
(Norway)	Suzann Pettersen	2002	2019	9	36	21	58.33%	18	12	6	2	4	3	7	5	2	9	3	1
(Germany)	Sophia Popov	2021	2021	1	3	0	0.00%	0	3	0	0	1	0	0	0	0	0	2	0
(Spain)	Beatriz Recari	2013	2013	1	4	3	75.00%	3	1	0	1	0	0	1	1	0	1	0	0
(Scotland)	Dale Reid	1990	1996	4	11	4.5	40.91%	4	6	1	2	2	0	1	2	1	1	2	0
(England)	Melissa Reid	2011	2021	4	16	7.5	46.88%	6	7	3	1	3	0	4	2	1	1	2	2
(England)	Mimi Rhodes	2026	2026	1	3	2	66.67%	2	1	0	0	1	0	1	0	0	1	0	0
(Sweden)	Madelene Sagström	2017	2024	4	12	5.5	45.83%	5	6	1	3	1	0	0	1	0	2	4	1
(Spain)	Ana Belén Sánchez	2003	2003	1	2	0	0.00%	0	2	0	0	1	0	0	0	0	0	1	0
(Italy)	Giulia Sergas	2013	2013	1	2	0.5	25.00%	0	1	1	0	0	1	0	0	0	0	1	0
(Sweden)	Annika Sörenstam	1994	2007	8	37	24	64.86%	22	11	4	4	3	1	11	3	1	7	5	2
(Sweden)	Charlotta Sörenstam	1998	1998	1	4	1.5	37.50%	1	2	1	0	1	0	1	0	0	0	1	1
(Sweden)	Maja Stark	2023	2026	3	12	7	58.33%	6	4	2	1	1	1	4	2	0	1	1	1
(England)	Karen Stupples	2005	2011	2	5	1	20.00%	1	4	0	1	1	0	0	2	0	0	1	0
(Denmark)	Iben Tinning	2002	2007	4	14	5.5	39.29%	4	7	3	2	2	0	0	3	1	2	2	2
(Switzerland)	Albane Valenzuela	2024	2024	1	2	0.5	25.00%	0	1	1	0	0	1	0	1	0	0	0	0
(Netherlands)	Anne van Dam	2019	2019	1	4	1	25.00%	1	3	0	0	1	0	0	1	0	1	1	0
(Sweden)	Linda Wessberg	2007	2007	1	2	1.5	75.00%	1	0	1	1	0	0	0	0	0	0	0	1
(England)	Lottie Woad	2026	2026	1	5	1.5	30.00%	1	3	1	1	0	0	0	2	0	0	1	1
(Scotland)	Pam Wright	1990	1994	3	9	3	33.33%	2	5	2	1	1	1	0	2	1	1	2	0

== Record European point winners ==
Up to and including the 2026 Solheim Cup.

Rank	Name	Record (W–L–H)	Points	Winning percentage
1	(England) Laura Davies	22–18–6	25	54.35%
2	(Sweden) Annika Sörenstam	22–11–4	24	64.86%
3	(Scotland) Catriona Matthew	18–11–8	22	59.46%
4	(Norway) Suzann Pettersen	18–12–6	21	58.33%
5	(Sweden) Anna Nordqvist	17–15–3	18.5	52.86%
6	(England) Charley Hull	16–12–4	18	56.25%
7	(Sweden) Sophie Gustafson	13–12–6	16	51.61%
8	(Spain) Carlota Ciganda	13–12–5	15.5	51.67%
9	(Sweden) Helen Alfredsson	11–15–2	12	42.86%
10	(Sweden) Carin Koch	10–3–3	11.5	71.88%

Laura Davies holds the record for most points won in the Solheim Cup by either a European or an American.

== European country records ==
Up to and including the 2026 Solheim Cup.

Country	Appearances	Events	Players	Most capped player(#)
Sweden	70	20	14	Anna Nordqvist (9)
England	57	20	16	Laura Davies (12)
Scotland	23	16	7	Catriona Matthew (9)
France	20	17	7	Céline Boutier (5)
Spain	19	13	8	Carlota Ciganda (8)
Germany	11	10	6	Caroline Masson (4)
Denmark	10	9	3	Emily Kristine Pedersen (4); Iben Tinning (4)
Norway	9	9	1	Suzann Pettersen (9)
Ireland	4	4	1	Leona Maguire (4)
Italy	2	2	2	Diana Luna (1); Giulia Sergas (1)
Netherlands	2	2	2	Christel Boeljon (1); Anne van Dam (1)
Wales	2	2	1	Becky Brewerton (2)
Belgium	1	1	1	Florence Descampe (1)
Finland	1	1	1	Matilda Castren (1)
Switzerland	1	1	1	Albane Valenzuela (1)

There were eight players in 1990, 10 in 1992 and 1994 and 12 in the contests since then, giving a total of 232 total appearances.

== Family relationships ==
Annika Sörenstam and Charlotta Sörenstam are sisters. They played together in the 1998 Solheim Cup.

== See also ==
- List of American Solheim Cup golfers
- Lists of golfers
