= List of American Solheim Cup golfers =

This is a list of all the golfers who represented the United States in the Solheim Cup from the first staging in 1990 through to 2026.

== Players ==
Player	Editions
Marina Alex	2019
Brittany Altomare	2019, 2021
Danielle Ammaccapane	1992
Donna Andrews	1994, 1998
Heather Bowie*	2003
Pat Bradley	1990, 1992, 1996
Brandie Burton	1992, 1994, 1996, 1998, 2000
Nicole Castrale	2007, 2009
Allisen Corpuz	2023, 2024, 2026
Lauren Coughlin	2024, 2026
Paula Creamer	2005, 2007, 2009, 2011, 2013, 2015, 2017
Beth Daniel	1990, 1992, 1994, 1996, 2000, 2002, 2003, 2005
Laura Diaz	2002, 2003, 2005, 2007
Lindy Duncan	2026
Austin Ernst	2017, 2021
Ally Ewing*	2019, 2021, 2023, 2024
Jane Geddes	1996
Cathy Gerring	1990
Tammie Green	1994, 1998
Natalie Gulbis	2005, 2007, 2009
Mina Harigae	2021
Pat Hurst	1998, 2000, 2002, 2005, 2007
Vicky Hurst	2011
Juli Inkster	1992, 1998, 2000, 2002, 2003, 2005, 2007, 2009, 2011
Becky Iverson	2000
Christa Johnson	1998
Rosie Jones	1990, 1996, 1998, 2000, 2002, 2003, 2005
Danielle Kang	2017, 2019, 2021, 2023
Cristie Kerr	2002, 2003, 2005, 2007, 2009, 2011, 2013, 2015, 2017
Megan Khang	2019, 2021, 2023, 2024, 2026
Auston Kim	2026
Christina Kim	2005, 2009, 2011
Betsy King	1990, 1992, 1994, 1996, 1998
Emilee Klein	2002
Jessica Korda	2013, 2017+, 2019, 2021
Nelly Korda	2019, 2021, 2023, 2024, 2026
Cheyenne Knight	2023
Kelli Kuehne	2002, 2003
Jennifer Kupcho	2021, 2023, 2024, 2026
Brittany Lang	2009, 2011, 2013, 2015, 2017
Alison Lee	2015, 2024, 2026
Andrea Lee	2023, 2024, 2026
Stacy Lewis	2011, 2013, 2015, 2017, 2019+
Brittany Lincicome	2007, 2009, 2011, 2013, 2015, 2017
Nancy Lopez	1990
Meg Mallon	1992, 1994, 1996, 1998, 2000, 2002, 2003, 2005
Michelle McGann	1996
Kristy McPherson	2009
Yealimi Noh	2021, 2026
Ryann O'Toole	2011
Annie Park	2019
Dottie Pepper*	1990, 1992, 1994, 1996, 1998, 2000
Gerina Piller	2013, 2015, 2017
Stacy Prammanasudh	2007
Morgan Pressel	2007, 2009, 2011, 2013, 2015, 2019
Michele Redman	2000, 2002, 2003, 2005
Deb Richard	1992
Kelly Robbins	1994, 1996, 1998, 2000, 2002, 2003
Lizette Salas	2013, 2015, 2017, 2019, 2021
Sarah Schmelzel	2024
Nancy Scranton	2000
Patty Sheehan	1990, 1992, 1994, 1996
Val Skinner	1996
Angela Stanford	2003, 2007, 2009, 2011, 2013, 2015
Sherri Steinhauer	1994, 1998, 2000, 2007
Lexi Thompson	2013, 2015, 2017, 2019, 2021, 2023, 2024
Lilia Vu	2023, 2024
Wendy Ward	2002, 2003, 2005
Michelle Wie	2009, 2011, 2013, 2015, 2017
Angel Yin	2017, 2019, 2023, 2026
Rose Zhang	2023, 2024, 2026

+ Selected or qualified for the team but withdrew and was replaced.
* Heather Bowie later became Heather Bowie Young. Dottie Pepper was called Dottie Mochrie from 1990 to 1994. Ally Ewing played as Ally McDonald in 2019.

== Playing record ==
O = Overall, S = Singles matches, Fs = Foursome matches, Fb = Fourball matches
W = Matches won, L = Matches lost, H = Matches halved

Player	First year	Last year	Solheim Cups	Matches	Points	Winning percentage	O W	O L	O H	S W	S L	S H	Fs W	Fs L	Fs H	Fb W	Fb L	Fb H
Marina Alex	2019	2019	1	4	2	50.00%	1	1	2	0	1	0	1	0	1	0	0	1
Brittany Altomare	2019	2021	2	8	4.5	56.25%	4	3	1	2	0	0	1	2	0	1	1	1
Danielle Ammaccapane	1992	1992	1	2	1	50.00%	1	1	0	0	1	0	1	0	0	0	0	0
Donna Andrews	1994	1998	2	7	4	57.14%	4	3	0	1	1	0	1	2	0	2	0	0
Heather Bowie	2003	2003	1	3	0	0.00%	0	3	0	0	1	0	0	2	0	0	0	0
Pat Bradley	1990	1996	3	8	2.5	31.25%	2	5	1	1	2	0	0	2	0	1	1	1
Brandie Burton	1992	2000	5	15	9	60.00%	8	5	2	3	2	0	3	3	0	2	0	2
Nicole Castrale	2007	2009	2	7	2	28.57%	2	5	0	1	1	0	0	2	0	1	2	0
Allisen Corpuz	2023	2026	3	12	6.5	54.17%	6	5	1	1	2	0	5	1	0	0	2	1
Lauren Coughlin	2024	2026	2	9	7	77.78%	6	1	2	1	0	1	4	0	0	1	1	1
Paula Creamer	2005	2017	7	31	19.5	62.90%	17	9	5	5	2	0	7	4	3	5	3	2
Beth Daniel	1990	2005	8	26	13.5	51.92%	10	9	7	3	3	2	3	4	2	4	2	3
Laura Diaz	2002	2007	4	13	6.5	50.00%	6	6	1	3	1	0	2	4	1	1	1	0
Lindy Duncan	2026	2026	1	3	2	66.67%	2	1	0	1	0	0	0	1	0	1	0	0
Austin Ernst	2017	2021	2	8	3.5	43.75%	3	4	1	0	1	1	2	2	0	1	1	0
Ally Ewing	2019	2024	4	16	3.5	21.88%	3	12	1	0	4	0	1	4	1	2	4	0
Jane Geddes	1996	1996	1	4	1.5	37.50%	1	2	1	1	0	0	0	0	1	0	2	0
Cathy Gerring	1990	1990	1	3	2	66.67%	2	1	0	1	0	0	1	0	0	0	1	0
Tammie Green	1994	1998	2	6	2	33.33%	2	4	0	2	0	0	0	2	0	0	2	0
Natalie Gulbis	2005	2009	3	10	5.5	55.00%	5	4	1	2	0	1	2	3	0	1	1	0
Mina Harigae	2021	2021	1	3	1	33.33%	1	2	0	0	1	0	0	0	0	1	1	0
Pat Hurst	1998	2007	5	20	11.5	57.50%	10	7	3	3	1	1	5	2	2	2	4	0
Vicky Hurst	2011	2011	1	2	1	50.00%	1	1	0	1	0	0	0	0	0	0	1	0
Juli Inkster	1992	2011	9	34	18.5	54.41%	15	12	7	6	1	2	6	6	3	3	5	2
Becky Iverson	2000	2000	1	4	2	50.00%	2	2	0	1	0	0	1	1	0	0	1	0
Christa Johnson	1998	1998	1	3	0.5	16.67%	0	2	1	0	1	0	0	0	0	0	1	1
Rosie Jones	1990	2005	7	22	12	54.55%	11	9	2	3	3	1	3	2	0	5	4	1
Danielle Kang	2017	2023	4	16	7	43.75%	7	9	0	2	2	0	3	4	0	2	3	0
Cristie Kerr	2002	2017	9	38	21	55.26%	18	14	6	3	4	2	4	5	3	11	5	1
Megan Khang	2019	2026	5	16	9.5	59.38%	8	5	3	3	1	1	2	2	1	3	2	1
Auston Kim	2026	2026	1	4	1	25.00%	1	3	0	0	1	0	0	1	0	1	1	0
Christina Kim	2005	2011	3	10	7	70.00%	6	2	2	3	0	0	2	1	1	1	1	1
Betsy King	1990	1998	5	15	8	53.33%	7	6	2	1	3	1	1	2	0	5	1	1
Emilee Klein	2002	2002	1	4	3	75.00%	3	1	0	1	0	0	1	0	0	1	1	0
Cheyenne Knight	2023	2023	1	3	2.5	83.33%	2	0	1	0	0	1	1	0	0	1	0	0
Jessica Korda	2013	2021	3	11	6	54.55%	5	4	2	2	0	1	3	2	0	0	2	1
Nelly Korda	2019	2026	5	20	13	65.00%	12	6	2	3	2	0	7	3	0	2	1	2
Kelli Kuehne	2002	2003	2	8	2	25.00%	2	6	0	0	2	0	0	2	0	2	2	0
Jennifer Kupcho	2021	2026	4	14	5	35.71%	4	8	2	1	3	0	1	5	0	2	0	2
Brittany Lang	2009	2017	5	17	8.5	50.00%	7	7	3	2	2	1	1	3	0	4	2	2
Alison Lee	2015	2026	3	11	6	54.55%	6	5	0	2	1	0	2	1	0	2	3	0
Andrea Lee	2023	2026	3	11	5	45.45%	4	5	2	0	1	2	1	3	0	3	1	0
Stacy Lewis	2011	2017	4	16	5.5	34.38%	5	10	1	0	3	1	2	6	0	3	1	0
Brittany Lincicome	2007	2017	6	21	8	38.10%	7	12	2	1	5	0	1	3	1	5	4	1
Nancy Lopez	1990	1990	1	3	2	66.67%	2	1	0	1	0	0	0	1	0	1	0	0
Meg Mallon	1992	2005	8	29	16.5	56.90%	13	9	7	5	2	1	3	6	2	5	1	4
Michelle McGann	1996	1996	1	4	2	50.00%	1	1	2	1	0	0	0	1	1	0	0	1
Kristy McPherson	2009	2009	1	4	1	25.00%	1	3	0	0	1	0	1	1	0	0	1	0
Yealimi Noh	2021	2026	2	6	3.5	58.33%	3	2	1	1	1	0	0	0	0	2	1	1
Ryann O'Toole	2011	2011	1	4	3	75.00%	2	0	2	0	0	1	1	0	0	1	0	1
Annie Park	2019	2019	1	3	1	33.33%	1	2	0	0	1	0	0	1	0	1	0	0
Dottie Pepper	1990	2000	6	20	14	70.00%	13	5	2	5	1	0	5	3	0	3	1	2
Gerina Piller	2013	2017	3	11	6	54.55%	5	4	2	2	0	1	1	2	0	2	2	1
Stacy Prammanasudh	2007	2007	1	3	2	66.67%	1	0	2	1	0	0	0	0	0	0	0	2
Morgan Pressel	2007	2019	6	22	12.5	56.82%	11	8	3	4	2	0	5	3	1	2	3	2
Michele Redman	2000	2005	4	11	5	45.45%	4	5	2	1	2	1	1	2	1	2	1	0
Deb Richard	1992	1992	1	2	1.5	75.00%	1	0	1	1	0	0	0	0	0	0	0	1
Kelly Robbins	1994	2003	6	24	12	50.00%	10	10	4	4	1	1	4	4	3	2	5	0
Lizette Salas	2013	2021	5	18	9.5	52.78%	8	7	3	3	1	1	2	3	1	3	3	1
Sarah Schmelzel	2024	2024	1	4	2	50.00%	2	2	0	0	1	0	1	1	0	1	0	0
Nancy Scranton	2000	2000	1	2	0	0.00%	0	2	0	0	1	0	0	0	0	0	1	0
Patty Sheehan	1990	1996	4	13	5.5	42.31%	5	7	1	1	3	0	3	1	1	1	3	0
Val Skinner	1996	1996	1	4	2	50.00%	2	2	0	1	0	0	1	0	0	0	2	0
Angela Stanford	2003	2015	6	20	5.5	27.50%	4	13	3	3	3	0	1	5	1	0	5	2
Sherri Steinhauer	1994	2007	4	13	8	61.54%	6	3	4	2	0	2	3	0	2	1	3	0
Lexi Thompson	2013	2024	7	27	13.5	50.00%	10	10	7	2	2	3	6	2	1	2	6	3
Lilia Vu	2023	2024	2	8	2.5	31.25%	2	5	1	1	0	1	1	2	0	0	3	0
Wendy Ward	2002	2005	3	11	2.5	22.73%	2	8	1	0	2	1	2	3	0	0	3	0
Michelle Wie	2009	2017	5	18	8.5	47.22%	8	9	1	2	3	0	3	3	0	3	3	1
Angel Yin	2017	2026	4	11	6	54.55%	5	4	2	2	1	1	0	0	0	3	3	1
Rose Zhang	2023	2026	3	11	6.5	59.09%	6	4	1	2	1	0	1	2	0	3	1	1

== Record American point winners ==
Up to and including the 2026 Solheim Cup.

Rank	Name	Record (W–L–H)	Points	Winning percentage
1	Cristie Kerr	18–14–6	21	55.26%
2	Paula Creamer	17–9–5	19.5	62.90%
3	Juli Inkster	15–12–7	18.5	54.41%
4	Meg Mallon	13–9–7	16.5	56.90%
5	Dottie Pepper	13–5–2	14	70.00%
6	Beth Daniel	10–9–7	13.5	51.92%
6	Lexi Thompson	10–10–7	13.5	50.00%
8	Nelly Korda	12–6–2	13	65.00%
9	Morgan Pressel	11–8–3	12.5	56.82%
10	Rosie Jones	11–9–2	12	54.55%
10	Kelly Robbins	10–10–4	12	50.00%

== Family relationships ==
Jessica Korda and Nelly Korda are sisters. They played together in the 2019 and 2021 Solheim Cups.

== See also ==
- Golf in the United States
- List of European Solheim Cup golfers
- Lists of golfers
