= Linda Bayman =

English professional golfer

Personal information
- Full name: Linda Louise Denison-Pender Bayman
- Nationality: England
- Born: 10 June 1948 (age 78)

Career
- Sport: Golf
- Status: Amateur

Achievements and awards
- Avia Watches Golfer of the Year Award: 1987

Linda Louise Denison-Pender Bayman (born 10 June 1948) is an English golfer.

== Personal life ==
Bayman was born Linda Louise Denison-Pender to Louise (née Riviere) and Richard Ernest Denison-Pender in 1948. She married John Edward Bayman in 1973 and thereafter competed under her married name, Bayman. Following her marriage she played relatively little top-level golf until 1982.

== Career ==
Bayman played for the National Team and won the European Ladies' Team Championship in 1973 with Mickey Walker and in 1985 with Trish Johnson.

She won the Vagliano Trophy in 1971, 1973, 1985 and 1987. She played in the 1988 Curtis Cup and won the bronze at the 1988 Espirito Santo Trophy at Royal Drottningholm Golf Club in Sweden together with Susan Shapcott and Julie Wade.

Bayman won the Avia Foursomes with Corinne Reybroeck in 1969 and 1971, and with Mickey Walker in 1973. Later she won it with Anne Sander in 1979 and with Maureen Garner in 1980 and 1985.

Bayman also excelled individually. She was a semi-finalist in the British Ladies Amateur 1971 and 1984. She won the English Women's Amateur Championship in 1983 and was a finalist in 1984 and 1985, and a semi-finalist in 1971, 1972, 1988 and 1989. She won a French Ladies Amateur Championship in 1974, and was Ladies' British Open Amateur Stroke Play champion in 1987. She was the leading qualifier in the British Ladies Amateur 1987, 1988 and 1989. She was a non-playing captain of the England Home Internationals team in 1995, 1996 and 1997.

== Amateur wins ==
- 1969 Avia Foursomes (with Corinne Reybroeck)
- 1971 Avia Foursomes (with Corinne Reybroeck)
- 1973 Avia Foursomes (with Mickey Walker) (tied)
- 1979 Avia Foursomes (with Anne Sander)
- 1980 Avia Foursomes (with Maureen Madill)
- 1983 English Women's Amateur Championship
- 1985 Avia Foursomes (with Maureen Garner)
- 1987 Ladies' British Open Amateur Stroke Play Championship

== Team appearances ==
- Curtis Cup (representing Great Britain & Ireland): 1988
- Vagliano Trophy (representing Great Britain & Ireland): 1971 (winners), 1973 (winners), 1985 (winners), 1987 (winners)
- Women's International Series (representing Great Britain and Ireland): 1973
- Espirito Santo Trophy (representing Great Britain & Ireland): 1988
- European Ladies' Team Championship (representing England): 1973 (winners), 1983, 1985 (winners), 1987, 1989
- Women's Home Internationals (representing England): 1971 (winners), 1972 (winners), 1973 (winners), 1983, 1984 (winners), 1985 (winners), 1987 (winners), 1988
