= Julie Hall (golfer) =

English amateur golfer

Personal information
- Full name: Julie Pauline Hall
- Nationality: England
- Born: 10 March 1967 (age 59) Suffolk, England

Career
- Sport: Golf
- Turned professional: 2011

Julie Pauline Hall (née Wade, later Otto, born 10 March 1967) is an English golfer. She won the Ladies' British Open Amateur Championship twice, in 1990 and 1995, and the English Women's Amateur Championship three times. She played in five Curtis Cup matches from 1988 to 1996. She turned professional in 2011 to follow a career in golf tuition.

== Golf career ==
Hall first came to prominence at the age of 20, when she won the 1987 English Women's Open Amateur Stroke Play Championship at Northumberland golf club, winning by 7 strokes from Alison Johns. The following week she won the English Intermediate Championship at Sheringham, a match-play event for women aged between 18 and 23, beating Sara Robinson 2&1 in the final. Earlier in the year she had made her senior debut for England in the European Ladies' Team Championship at Turnberry. In 1987 she also made her first appearance in the Women's Home Internationals, played that year at Ashburnham. England won the event, with Hall unbeaten in her six matches.

In March 1988 Hall was selected for the Curtis Cup match, to be played in June at Royal St George's. In April she won the English Women's Amateur Championship at Little Aston, beating Susan Shapcott in the final at the 19th hole. In June Great Britain and Ireland retainied the Curtis Cup, winning by 11 matches to 7. Hall played with Linda Bayman in both foursomes sessions, winning one match and losing the other. In the singles she beat Cindy Scholefield but lost to Tracy Kerdyk. The following week Hall reached the final of the Ladies' British Open Amateur Championship at Royal Cinque Ports, losing 4&3 to Joanne Furby. In August she was runner-up in the English Women's Open Amateur Stroke Play Championship at Wentworth, behind Sally Prosser, and was then a runner-up to Karen Mitchell in the Ladies' British Open Amateur Stroke Play Championship at Royal Porthcawl, two weeks later. In September she played in the 1988 Espirito Santo Trophy at Royal Drottningholm in Sweden, where the team took the bronze medal.

In early 1989, playing with Linda Bayman, they were runners-up in the Avia Foursomes behind Lora Fairclough and Joanne Morley. Hall also reached the final of the English Intermediate Championship, losing to Lora Fairclough, and made her debut in the Vagliano Trophy match in Italy. In 1990 Hall won the Ladies' British Open Amateur Championship at Dunbar, beating Helen Wadsworth 3&2 in the final. She was included in the Curtis Cup team for Bernardsville, New Jersey, which was selected immediately afterwards. The American won by 14 points to 4. Hall's results showed a similar pattern to 1988, with two wins on the first day followed by two defeats on the final day. She played with Kathryn Imrie in both foursomes sessions. In the singles she beat Vicki Goetze but lost to Karen Noble. She was again included in the Espirito Santo Trophy team for the event which was held in New Zealand in October. The team repeated their 1988 performance, again taking the bronze medal.

In 1991 she won the Helen Holm Scottish Women's Open Championship by 5 strokes from Linzi Fletcher. She also played that year in the Vagliano Trophy and Commonwealth Trophy. In early 1992 she won the Spanish Amateur Championship and was runner-up in the Helen Holm Championship behind Mhairi McKay. She played in the 1992 Curtis Cup match at Royal Liverpool, Great Britain & Ireland winning by 10 points to 8. She played with Caroline Hall in the foursomes matches, halving both matches. She lost to Vicki Goetze in the opening day singles and was not selected for the final day singles.

Hall had an exceptional season in 1993, winning four important open stroke-play championships, the Helen Holm Scottish Women's Open Championship, the Welsh Women's Open Stroke Play Championship, the English Women's Open Amateur Stroke Play Championship and the Ladies' British Open Amateur Stroke Play Championship. She also reached the semi-finals of the Ladies' British Open Amateur Championship at Royal Lytham, losing to Kirsty Speak. Despite her achievements she was only a joint winner of the 1993 Daily Telegraph woman golfer of the year award with Catriona Lambert, who won the British, Scottish and Spanish championships and also the St Rule Trophy.

In 1994 Hall won the English Women's Amateur Championship at The Berkshire, beating Suzanne Sharpe by one hole in the final. She led the qualifying in the Ladies' British Open Amateur Championship.at Newport after rounds of 70 and 72, to be the top seed. However she lost to Catriona Matthew in the quarter-finals. She was again selected for the Curtis Cup team, which was announced after the British championship. The match in Chattanooga was tied, which meant that Great Britain & Ireland retained the cup. Hall played with Lisa Walton in both foursomes sessions, winning both matches. She played against Jill McGill in both singles sessions, halving on the first day but losing on the final day. Later in the year she played in the Espirito Santo Trophy in France. The team had a poor start and were lying 25th after the opening day. However they recovered to finish in a tie for 8th place.

Hall had more success in 1995. She was a runner-up behind Maria Hjorth in the Helen Holm Scottish Women's Open Championship. She retained her English Women's Amateur Championship title at Ipswich, her third win in the event, beating Elaine Ratcliffe in the final. As in 1994 she led the qualifying in the Ladies' British Open Amateur Championship, with rounds of 74 and 70 at Royal Portrush. She went on to win the title beating Kristel Mourgue d'Algue 3&2 in the final. Her semi-final match against Janice Moodie had gone to 21 holes before she was successful. In September she was part of the Great Britain team for the Commonwealth Trophy in Australia where the team finished second. The following week she won the Australian Women's Amateur beating Helen Beatty in the final. For winning the English, British and Australian titles she was chosen as the 1995 Daily Telegraph woman golfer of the year.

In early 1996 Hall won the Spanish Amateur Championship for the second time, beating Maria Hjorth in the final. In April Hall was selected for the Curtis Cup match, played in June in Killarney. she had announced that she would be retiring from competitive golf after the event. Great Britain & Ireland won the match but Hall lost all four of her matches, two foursomes played with Lisa Educate and two singles matches. Free made a brief return to competitive golf in 1997, winning the Sunningdale Foursomes with Helen Wadsworth.

From 1996 to 2000 Hall was tournament secretary and then secretary of the Ladies Golf Union at St Andrews. She then became Assistant Director of Rules at the R&A until 2007. She turned professional in 2011 to follow a career in golf tuition.

== Personal life ==
She married Michael Hall in April 1989 and Steve Otto in 2003.

== Team appearances ==
- European Lady Junior's Team Championship (representing England): 1986 (winners)
- Curtis Cup (representing Great Britain & Ireland): 1988 (winners), 1990, 1992 (winners), 1994 (tied), 1996 (winners)
- Espirito Santo Trophy (representing Great Britain & Ireland): 1988, 1990, 1994
- Vagliano Trophy (representing Great Britain & Ireland): 1989 (winners), 1991 (winners), 1993 (winners), 1995
- Commonwealth Trophy (representing Great Britain): 1991 (winners), 1995
- European Ladies' Team Championship (representing England): 1987, 1989, 1991 (winners), 1993 (winners), 1995
- Women's Home Internationals (representing England): 1987 (winners), 1988, 1989 (winners), 1990, 1991, 1992 (winners), 1993 (winners), 1994 (winners), 1995 (winners)
- European Lady Junior's Team Championship (representing England): 1986 (winners)
