= 1985 European Ladies' Team Championship =

Golf competition

Tournament information
- Dates: 3–7 July 1985
- Location: Hafrsfjord, Stavanger, Norway; 58.9580°N 5.6525°E
- Course: Stavanger Golf Club
- Organized by: European Golf Association
- Format: 36 holes stroke play Knock-out match-play

Statistics
- Par: 71
- Field: 15 teams 90 players

Champion
- England; Linda Bayman, Trish Johnson, Susan Moorcraft, Carole Swallow, Jill Thornhill, Claire Waite
- Qualification round: 742 (+32); Final match 4–3

Location map
- Location in Europe Location in Norway Location in Rogaland county

The 1985 European Ladies' Team Championship took place 3–7 July at Stavanger Golf Club in Hafrsfjord, Norway. It was the 14th women's golf amateur European Ladies' Team Championship.

== Venue ==
The hosting club was founded in 1956. The course, constructed by English course architect Fred Smith and situated in Hafrsfjord, 5 kilometres from the city center of Stavanger in Rogaland county, Norway, was completed with 18 holes in 1963, making it the second oldest 18-hole-course in Norway.

The championship course was set up with par 71.

== Format ==
All participating teams played two qualification rounds of stroke-play with six players, counted the five best scores for each team.

The eight best teams formed flight A, in knock-out match-play over the next three days. The teams were seeded based on their positions after the stroke-play. The first placed team was drawn to play the quarter-final against the eight placed team, the second against the seventh, the third against the sixth and the fourth against the fifth. In each match between two nation teams, two 18-hole foursome games and five 18-hole single games were played. Teams were allowed to switch players during the team matches, selecting other players in to the afternoon single games after the morning foursome games. Games all square after 18 holes were declared halved, if the team match was already decided.

The seven teams placed 9–15 in the qualification stroke-play formed Flight B, to play similar knock-out play to decide their final positions.

== Teams ==
15 nation teams contested the event. Each team consisted of six players.

Players in the leading teams

Country	Players
England	Linda Bayman, Trish Johnson, Susan Moorcraft, Carole Swallow, Jill Thornhill, Claire Waite
Ireland	Claire Dowling Hourihane, Maureen Madill Garner, Mary McKenna, Yvonne McQullan, Sheena O'Brian Keeney
Italy	Binaghi, Emanuelo Braito-Binetti, Stefania Croce, Elena Girardi, Stefania Scarpa, Soldi
Scotland	Alison Gemmill, Lesley Hope, Shirley Lawson, Donna Thomson, Belle Robertson, Pam Wright
Switzerland	Regine Lautens, Evelyn Orley, Jackie Orley, Priscilla Staible, Pia Ullman
Sweden	Helen Alfredsson, Eva Dahllöf, Sofia Grönberg, Camilla Karlsson, Anna Oxenstierna, Jessica Posener
Wales	Karen Davies, Sue Jump, Mandy Rawlings, Sue Thomas, Vicki Thomas, Helen Wadsworth
West Germany	Martina Koch. Patricia Peter, Ursula Beer, S. Haubensak, Martina Kötter, Stephanie Lampert

Other participating teams

Country
Belgium
Denmark
Finland
France
Netherlands
Norway
Spain

== Winners ==
Team England lead the opening 36-hole qualifying competition, with a score of 32 over par 742, ten strokes ahead of team France.

Tied individual leaders in the 36-hole stroke-play competition was Helen Alfredsson, Sweden, and Stefania Croce, Italy, each with a score of 2-over-par 144, two strokes ahead of four players at tied third.

England won the gold, earning their sixth title, beating team Italy in the final 4–3. Team Switzerland, for the first time on the podium, earned third place, beating Sweden 5 1/2–1 1/2 in the bronze match.

== Results ==
Qualification round

Team standings

Place	Country	Score	To par
1	England	372-370=742	+32
2	France	383-369 =752	+42
3	Italy	383-378 =761	+51
4	Ireland	390-374=764	+54
5	Sweden	391-377=768	+58
6	Wales	389-385=774	+64
7	Switzerland	386-391=777	+67
8	Spain	389-389=778	+68
9	Scotland	390-389=779	+69
10	West Germany	783	+73
11	Denmark	789	+79
12	Norway	808	+98
13	Netherlands	812	+102
14	Belgium	816	+106
15	Finland	832	+122

Individual leaders

Place	Player	Country	Score	To par
T1	Helen Alfredsson	Sweden	73-71=144	+2
T1	Stefania Croce	Italy	72-72=144	+2
T3	Trish Johnson	England	73-73=146	+4
T3	Martina Koch	West Germany	73-73=146	+4
T3	Vicki Thomas	Wales	75-71=146	+4
T3	Jill Thornhill	England	75-71=146	+4
7	Marie-Laure de Lorenzi	France	73-74=147	+5
T8	Susan Moorcraft	England	75-73=148	+6
T8	Cécilia Mourgue d'Algue	France	78-70=148	+6
T10	Linda Denison Pender Bayman	England	72-77=149	+7
T10	Helen Wadsworth	Wales	76-73=149	+7

Note: There was no official award for the lowest individual score.

Flight A

Bracket

Quarter finals
Italy	4.5
Wales	2.5
Switzerland	4.5
France	2.5
Sweden	6
Ireland	1
England	4.5
Spain	2.5

Semi finals
Italy	4.5
Switzerland	2.5
England	4
Sweden	3

Final
England	4
Italy	3
Bronze match
Switzerland	5.5
Sweden	1.5

Elimination matches
Wales	4
France	3
Spain	5
Ireland	2

Match for 5th place
Wales	4
Spain	3
Match for 7th place
France	4
Ireland	3

Final games

England	Italy
4	3
T. Johnson / L. Denison Pender Bayman	E. Braito-Binetti / E. Girardi 5 & 4
J. Thornhill / C. Waite 4 & 3	S. Croce / Soldi
Trish Johnson 5 & 3	Elena Girardi
Jill Thornhill 4 & 3	Stefania Croce
Linda Denison Pender Bayman	Emanuelo Braito-Binetti 2 holes
Susan Moorcraft	Stefania Scarpa 2 & 1
Claire Waite 3 & 2	Binaghi

Flight B

Bracket

Round 1
West Germany	7
Finland	0
Denmark	7
Belgium	0
Norway	4
Netherlands	3

Round 2
West Germany	5.5
Denmark	1.5
Scotland	4
Norway	3

Match for 9th place
Scotland	4.5
West Germany	2.5
Match for 11th place
Denmark	6
Norway	1

Elimination match
Belgium	6.5
Finland	0.5

Match for 13th place
Belgium	4
Netherlands	3

Final standings

Place	Country
1st place, gold medalist(s)	England
2nd place, silver medalist(s)	Italy
3rd place, bronze medalist(s)	Switzerland
4	Sweden
5	Wales
6	Spain
7	France
8	Ireland
9	Scotland
10	West Germany
11	Denmark
12	Norway
13	Belgium
14	Netherlands
15	Finland

== See also ==
- Espirito Santo Trophy – biennial world amateur team golf championship for women organized by the International Golf Federation.
- European Amateur Team Championship – European amateur team golf championship for men organised by the European Golf Association.
