= 1987 European Ladies' Team Championship =

Golf competition

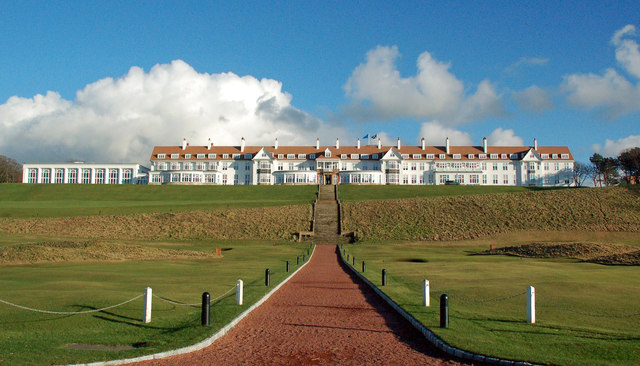
- Turnberry Golf Resort

Tournament information
- Dates: 8–12 July 1987
- Location: South Ayrshire, Scotland; 55.316°N 4.833°W
- Course: Turnberry Golf Resort (Ailsa Course)
- Organized by: European Golf Association
- Format: 36 holes stroke play Knock-out match-play

Statistics
- Par: 73
- Field: 13 teams 78 players

Champion
- Sweden; Helen Alfredsson, Margareta Bjurö, Eva Dahllöf, Sofia Grönberg, Helene Koch, Malin Landehag
- Qualification round: 776 (+46); Final match 6–1

Location map
- Location in Europe Location in the British Isles Location in Scotland

The 1987 European Ladies' Team Championship took place 8–12 July at Turnberry Golf Resort in South Ayrshire, Scotland, United Kingdom. It was the 15th women's golf amateur European Ladies' Team Championship.

== Venue ==
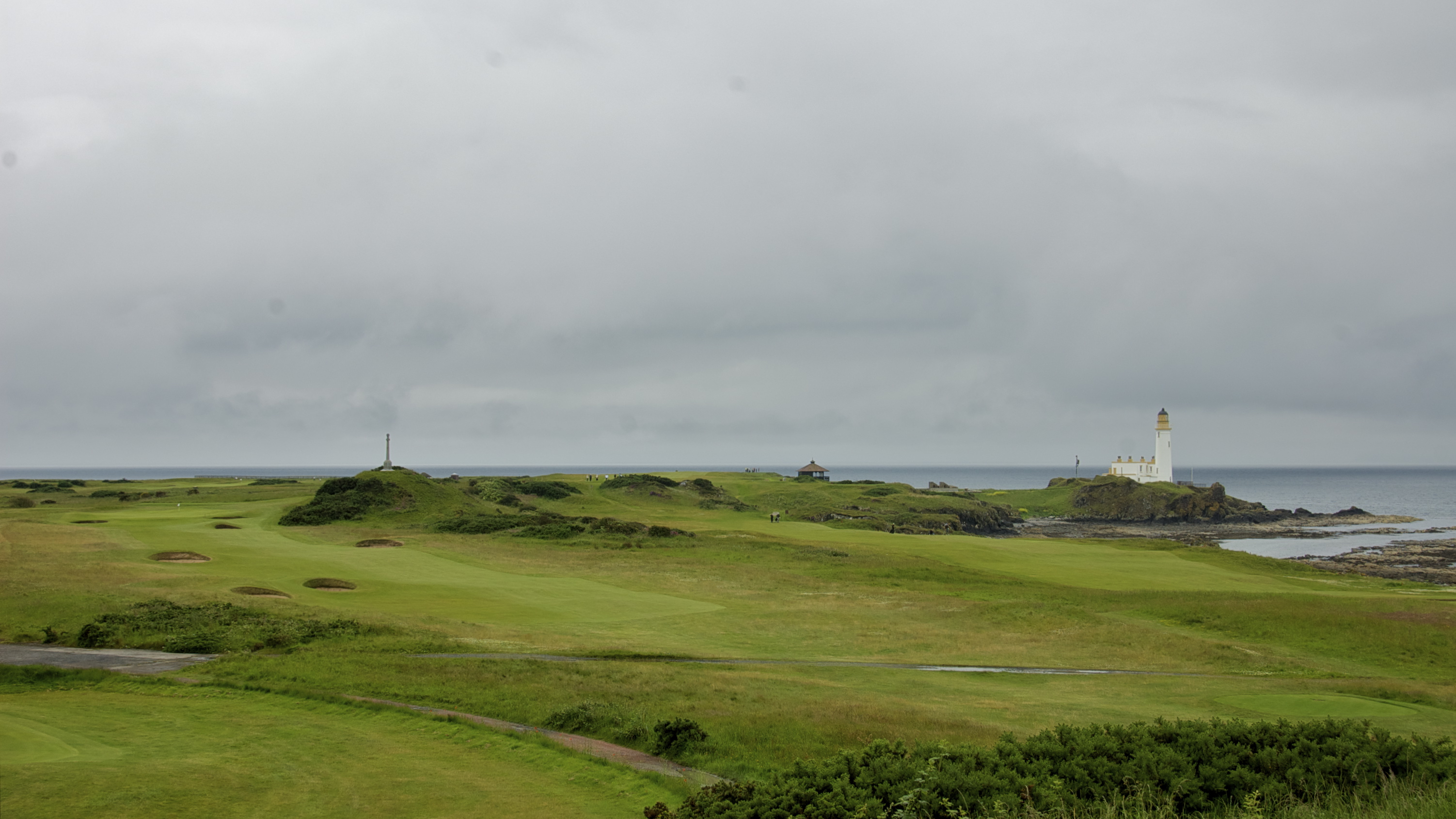
The 10th and 12th holes on the Ailsa course

The Ailsa Course, situated 80 kilometres south of Glasgow, Scotland, on headland along the Firth of Clyde, overlooking the Isle of Arran and Ailsa Craig, was initially opened with 13 holes in 1901, designed by Willie Fernie, and later completed to 18 holes. It was redesigned by Mackenzie Ross between 1949 and 1951.

The course had previously hosted The Open Championship twice; 1977 and 1986.

The championship course was set up with par 73.

On the first day of competition, it was blowing strong winds on the course. The second day it was warm and windless. The third day, when the quarterfinals was intended to take place, heavy rain caused play to be postponed to the day after.

== Format ==
All participating teams played two qualification rounds of stroke-play with six players, counted the five best scores for each team.

The eight best teams formed flight A, in knock-out match-play over the next three days. The teams were seeded based on their positions after the stroke-play. The first placed team was drawn to play the quarter-final against the eight placed team, the second against the seventh, the third against the sixth and the fourth against the fifth.

In each match between two nation teams, two 18-hole foursome games and five 18-hole single games were to be played. Because of delay of play, due to bad weather, quarter finals and semi finals were played on the same day, without foursome games and only with five single games.

Teams were allowed to switch players during the team matches, selecting other players in to the afternoon single games after the morning foursome games. If a game was all square after 18 holes, it was declared halved, if the team match was already decided.

The five teams placed 9–13 in the qualification stroke-play formed Flight B, to meet each other over three rounds to decide their final positions.

== Teams ==
13 nation teams contested the event. Each team consisted of six players.

Players in the leading teams

Country	Players
England	Linda Bayman, Joanne Furby, Susan Moorcraft, Susan Shapcott, Jill Thornhill, Julie Wade
Ireland	Eavan Higgins, Claire Hourihane, Eileen Rose McDaid, Mary McKenna, Therese Moran O'Reilly, Philomena Wickham
France	Caroline Bourtayre, Valérie Golléty-Pamard, Cécilia Mourgue d'Algue, Véronique Palli
Scotland	Fiona Anderson, Lindsey Anderson, Julie Forbes, Kathryn Imrie, Shirley Lawson Huggan, Pam Wright
Spain	Tania Abitbol, Lourdes Barbieto, Maria Orueta, Esther Tamarit, Sonia Wunsch
Sweden	Helen Alfredsson, Margareta Bjurö, Eva Dahllöf, Sofia Grönberg, Helene Koch, Malin Landehag
Wales	Pam Light Chugg, Karen Davies, Julie Foster, Sharon Roberts, Vicki Thomas, Helen Wadsworth
West Germany	Ursula Beer, Martina Fischer, Martina Koch. Stephanie Lampert, Vanessa Motte, Rita Ruland

Other participating teams

Country
Belgium
Denmark
Italy
Netherlands
Switzerland

== Winners ==
Host nation Scotland and team France tied the lead at the opening 36-hole qualifying competition, each with a score of 26 over par 756, with Scotland winning by the tie-breaking better total non-counting scores.

Individual leader in the 36-hole stroke-play competition was Sofia Grönberg, Sweden, with a score of 1-under-par 145, one stroke ahead of Shirley Lawson, Scotland and Vicki Thomas, Wales. This was the fourth time in a row, and fifth time in the last seven championships, a Swedish player had won or tied the win in the individual competition, achieved by five different players.

Team Sweden won the gold, earning their second title, beating team Wales in the final 6–1. Team Spain earned third place, beating Scotland 5–2 in the bronze match.

== Results ==
Qualification round

Team standings

Place	Country	Score	To par
T1	Scotland *	377-379=756	+26
T1	France	385-371=756	+26
3	England	381-384=765	+35
4	Wales	392-376=768	+38
5	Ireland	390-379=769	+39
6	Sweden	384-392=776	+46
T7	Spain *	392-385=777	+47
T7	West Germany	777	+47
9	Italy	788	+58
10	Belgium	792	+62
11	Switzerland	803	+73
12	Netherlands	806	+76
13	Denmark	813	+83

* Note: In the event of a tie the order was determined by the better non-counting score.

Individual leaders

Place	Player	Country	Score	To par
1	Sofia Grönberg	Sweden	75-70=145	−1
T2	Shirley Lawson	Scotland	71-75=146	E
T2	Vicki Thomas	Wales	74-72=146	E
T4	Caroline Bourtayre	France	72-75=147	+1
T4	Mette Hageman	Netherlands	75-72=147	+1
6	Martina Koch	West Germany	78-70=148	+2
7	Pamela Wright	Scotland	73-76=149	+3
T8	Linda Bayman	England	77-73=150	+4
T8	Julia Forbes	Scotland	74-76=150	+4
T8	Regine Lautens	Switzerland	75-77=152	+4
T8	Eileen Rose McDaid	Ireland	79-71=150	+4
T8	Cécilia Mourgue d'Algue	France	78-72=150	+4
T8	Evelyn Orley	Switzerland	73-77=150	+4
T8	Valérie Golléty-Pamard	France	79-71=150	+4
T8	Julie Wade	England	77-73=150	+4

Note: There was no official award for the lowest individual score.

Flight A

Bracket

Quarter finals *
Scotland	3
West Germany	2
Wales	4
Ireland	1
Sweden	3
England	2
Spain	4.5
France	0.5

Semi finals *
Wales	4
Scotland	1
Sweden	4.5
Spain	0.5

Final
Sweden	6
Wales	1
Bronze match
Spain	5
Scotland	2

* Note: The quarter finals were delayed due to bad weather and played on the same day as the semi-finals, why five single games and no foursome games were played in the matches on that day.

Final games

Sweden	Wales
6	1
H. Alfredsson / E. Dahllöf 20th hole	V. Thomas / S. Roberts
H. Andersson / S. Grönberg 3 & 2	K. Davies / H. Wadsworth
Malin Landehag	Vicki Thomas 2 & 1
Helene Andersson 3 & 2	Karen Davies
Sofia Grönberg 1 hole	Helen Wadsworth
Helen Alfredsson 6 & 5	Pam Chugg
Eva Dahllöf 4 & 3	Sharon Roberts

Match for 5th place

England	West Germany
4	3

Match for 7th place

France	Ireland
6	1

Flight B

First round *

Denmark	Netherlands
4	1

Belgium	Switzerland
3	2

* Note: The first round was delayed due to bad weather and played on the same day as the second round, why five single games and no foursome games were played in the matches on that day.

Second round *

Italy	Denmark
3.5	1.5

Switzerland	Netherlands
3	2

Third round

Italy	Belgium
4	3

Switzerland	Denmark
5	2

Final standings

Place	Country
1st place, gold medalist(s)	Sweden
2nd place, silver medalist(s)	Wales
3rd place, bronze medalist(s)	Spain
4	Scotland
5	England
6	West Germany
7	France
8	Ireland
9	Italy
10	Belgium
11	Switzerland
12	Denmark
13	Netherlands

== See also ==
- Espirito Santo Trophy – biennial world amateur team golf championship for women organized by the International Golf Federation.
- European Amateur Team Championship – European amateur team golf championship for men organised by the European Golf Association.
