= Jill Thornhill =

English amateur golfer (born 1942)

Personal information
- Full name: Jill Thornhill
- Nationality: England
- Born: 18 August 1942 (age 84)

Career
- Sport: Golf
- Status: Amateur

Jill Thornhill (née Woodside, born 18 August 1942) is an English amateur golfer. Her biggest successes came after reaching 40. She won the 1983 British Ladies Amateur, the 1986 English Women's Amateur Championship and the 1993 Women's Senior Amateur. She played in the Curtis Cup in 1984, 1986 and 1988.

== Golf career ==
In 1960 Thornhill was not selected for the England team for the England–Scotland girls match, but went on to reach the semi-finals of the Girls Amateur Championship, losing to Ann Irvin. In 1961, playing with future husband John Thornhill, they reached the final of the Worplesdon Mixed Foursomes, losing to Frances Smith and Bruce Critchley. In 1962 Thornhill was a runner-up, with Ann Irvin, in the Kayser Bondor Foursomes. She reached the final of the 1964 French amateur match-play championship, losing to Brigitte Varangot. In 1965 she gained international honours, playing for winning England teams in the Women's Home Internationals and the European Ladies' Team Championship and for Great Britain and Ireland in the Vagliano Trophy, the Continent of Europe winning for the first time.

In 1970 Thornhill won the Avia Foursomes with Gillian Cheetham. In 1974 Thornhill lost to Ann Irvin in the final of the English Women's Amateur Championship. The following week she won the Newmark International at Walton Heath, threes strokes ahead of Anne Stant. At the end of 1974 she and her husband reached the final of the Worplesdon Mixed Foursomes. They did even better the following year, winning the event for the first time.

Thornhill won the 1983 Avia Foursomes with Jill Nicolson. Later in 1983 she won the British Ladies Amateur beating Regine Lautens, 4 and 2, in the final at Silloth on Solway. She had narrowly beaten Marie-Laure de Taya by one hole in the semi-finals, with an eagle-birdie finish. Thornhill made her Curtis Cup debut at Muirfield in 1984, the Americans winning by a single point. In 1985, again with Nicolson, they were runner-ups in the Avia Foursomes. She was leading amateur at the 1985 Women's British Open. In 1986 she won the English Women's Amateur Championship beating Susan Shapcott in the final. She also played in the Curtis Cup again, Great Britain and Ireland winning by 13 points to 5. In 1987 she was a runner-up in the Ladies' British Open Amateur Stroke Play Championship, two strokes behind Linda Bayman. Thornhill made her final appearance in the Curtis Cup in 1988, Great Britain and Ireland retaining the cup at Royal St George's.

In 1993 Thornhill won the Women's Senior Amateur. She was runner-up the following year.

== Team appearances ==
- Curtis Cup (representing Great Britain & Ireland): 1984, 1986 (winners), 1988 (winners)
- Vagliano Trophy (representing Great Britain & Ireland): 1965, 1983 (winners), 1985 (winners), 1987 (winners)
- Espirito Santo Trophy: (representing Great Britain & Ireland): 1986
- Commonwealth Trophy (representing Great Britain): 1983, 1987
- European Ladies' Team Championship (representing England): 1965 (winners), 1983, 1985 (winners), 1987
- Women's Home Internationals (representing England): 1965 (winners), 1974, 1982 (winners), 1983, 1984 (winners), 1985 (winners), 1986, 1987 (winners), 1988
