= Avia Foursomes =

Women's foursomes golf tournament

Tournament information
- Location: Ascot, Berkshire, England
- Established: 1958
- Course: The Berkshire Golf Club
- Format: Foursomes stroke play
- Month played: March
- Final year: 1989

The Avia Foursomes was a women's foursomes golf tournament contested annually from 1958 to 1989. It was held at Sunningdale Golf Club in its first year but was then played at the Berkshire Golf Club near Ascot, Berkshire. The event consisted of 72 holes of stroke play. From 1958 to 1964 it was called the Kayser Bondor Foursomes and in 1965 Casa Pupo Foursomes before being sponsored by Avia watches from 1966. Avia withdrew their sponsorship after the 1989 event.

In 1978 the event was opened up to professionals, although they had to play with an amateur.

The 1958 event resulted in a tie, with two pairs equal on 317. An event was planned for 1964 but was abandoned because of snow. The 1971 event was reduced to 36 holes after rain caused the final day to be lost. Early morning fog on the final day reduced the 1974 event to 63 holes, with only 9 holes played in the third round. The 1975 event was abandoned due to snow. The first round had not been completed when it as decided to cancel the event. The 1980 event was reduced to 63 holes after snow and rain reduced play on the opening day to 9 holes. The 1985 event was reduced to 36 holes after snow meant that no play was possible on the final day. The 1989 event was reduced to 54 holes by rain.

== Winners ==
Year	Winners	Score	Margin of victory	Runners-up	Ref
Kayser Bondor Foursomes
1958	(England) Angela Bonallack & (Scotland) Janette Robertson (England) Elizabeth Price & (England) Marley Spearman	317	Tie		
1959	(Scotland) Jean Anderson & (Scotland) Jessie Valentine	314	6 strokes	(France) Vicomtesse de St Sauveur & (France) Brigitte Varangot	
1960	(France) Vicomtesse de St Sauveur & (France) Brigitte Varangot	302	10 strokes	(England) Angela Bonallack & (England) Elizabeth Price	
1961	(Scotland) Jessie Valentine & (Scotland) Janette Wright	304	4 strokes	(Italy) Isa Goldschmid & (Scotland) Belle Robertson	
1962	(Scotland) Jean Anderson & (England) Bridget Jackson	308	4 strokes	(England) Ann Irvin & (England) Jill Thornhill	
1963	(Italy) Isa Goldschmid & (France) Brigitte Varangot	307	8 strokes	(England) Marley Spearman & (France) Vicomtesse de St Sauveur	
1964	Abandoned due to snow				
Casa Pupo Foursomes
1965	(England) Marley Spearman & (France) Brigitte Varangot	290	21 strokes	(France) Claudine Cros & (England) Ann Irvin	
Avia Foursomes
1966	(France) Vicomtesse de St Sauveur & (France) Brigitte Varangot	307	12 strokes	(England) Angela Bonallack & (England) Shirley Ward	
1967	(England) Bridget Jackson & (England) Vivien Saunders	314	6 strokes	(England) Liz Chadwick & (France) Catherine Lacoste	
1968	(England) Ann Irvin & (England) Ruth Porter	317	4 strokes	(Italy) Isa Goldschmid & (England) Pam Tredinnick	
1969	(England) Linda Denison-Pender & (Belgium) Corinne Reybroeck	319	1 stroke	(England) Beverly Huke & (France) Catherine Lacoste	
1970	(England) Gillian Cheetham & (England) Jill Thornhill	305	5 strokes	(England) Sally Barber & (England) Mary Everard	
1971	(England) Linda Denison-Pender & (Belgium) Corinne Reybroeck	150	2 strokes	(Scotland) Belle Robertson & (England) Frances Smith	
1972	(England) Diane Frearson & (Scotland) Belle Robertson	303	1 stroke	(England) Sally Barber & (England) Mary Everard	
1973	(England) Linda Denison-Pender & (England) Mickey Walker (France) Anne-Marie Palli & (France) Brigitte Varangot	307	Tie		
1974	(England) Carol Le Feuvre & (England) Carole Redford	268	2 strokes	(England) Linda Bayman & (Republic of Ireland) Maisie Mooney	
1975	Abandoned due to snow				
1976	(England) Sally Barber & (England) Angela Bonallack	307	1 stroke	(Wales) Audrey Briggs & (England) Patricia Harvie	
1977	(Republic of Ireland) Mary McKenna & (Wales) Tegwen Perkins	312	1 stroke	(Scotland) Sandra Needham & (England) Angela Uzielli	
1978	(England) Mary Everard & (England) Vivien Saunders	310	5 strokes	(Republic of Ireland) Mary McKenna & (Wales) Tegwen Perkins	
1979	(England) Linda Bayman & (United States) Anne Sander	302	6 strokes	(England) Sally Barber & (England) Angela Uzielli	
1980	(England) Linda Bayman & (Northern Ireland) Maureen Madill	266	2 strokes	(Republic of Ireland) Mary McKenna & (Wales) Tegwen Thomas	
1981	(Scotland) Belle Robertson & (Scotland) Winnie Wooldridge	309	1 stroke	(England) Jane Chapman & (England) Christine McIntosh	
1982	(Scotland) Wilma Aitken & (England) Angela Uzielli	298	4 strokes	(England) Linda Bayman & (Northern Ireland) Maureen Madill	
1983	(Scotland) Jill Nicolson & (England) Jill Thornhill	305	2 strokes	(England) Linda Bayman & (Northern Ireland) Maureen Madill	
1984	(Republic of Ireland) Mary McKenna & (Scotland) Belle Robertson	298	1 stroke	(England) Laura Davies & (England) Sarah Duhig	
1985	(England) Linda Bayman & (Northern Ireland) Maureen Garner	149	2 strokes	(Scotland) Jill Nicolson & (England) Jill Thornhill	
1986	(Republic of Ireland) Mary McKenna & (Scotland) Belle Robertson	298	2 strokes	(England) Linda Bayman & (Northern Ireland) Maureen Garner	
1987	(England) Tracy Hammond & (England) Susan Moorcraft	301	1 stroke	(England) Janet Collingham & (England) Pat Smillie	
1988	(England) Karen Mitchell & (England) Nicola Way	305	1 stroke	(England) Elizabeth Boatman & (England) Angela Uzielli	
1989	(England) Lora Fairclough & (England) Joanne Morley	224	3 strokes	(England) Linda Bayman & (England) Julie Wade	
