= 1983 European Ladies' Team Championship =

Golf competition

Tournament information
- Dates: 22–26 June 1983
- Location: Lasne, Walloon Brabant, Belgium; 50°41′20″N 04°27′00″E
- Course: Royal Waterloo Golf Club
- Organized by: European Golf Association
- Format: 36 holes stroke play Knock-out match-play

Statistics
- Par: 73
- Length: 6,296 yards (5,757 m)
- Field: 16 teams 96 players

Champion
- Ireland; Claire Hourihane, Eavan Higgins, Mary McKenna, Maureen Madill, Carol Wickham, Philomena Wickham
- Qualification round: 770 (+40); Final match 5 1/2–1 1/2

Location map
- Location in Europe Location in Belgium

The 1983 European Ladies' Team Championship took place 22–26 June at the Royal Waterloo Golf Club in Lasne, Belgium. It was the 13th women's golf amateur European Ladies' Team Championship.

== Venue ==
The hosting club was founded in 1923 by Rodolphe Seeldrayers. The course was designed by architect Frederick William Hawtree and established in 1961 in Ohain, Lasne, in the region of Wallon Brabant, close to the historic Waterloo battlefield, 20 kilometres south-east of the city center of Brussels, Belgium.

The championship course was set up with par 73.

== Format ==
All participating teams played two qualification rounds of stroke-play with six players, counted the five best scores for each team.

The eight best teams formed flight A, in knock-out match-play over the next three days. The teams were seeded based on their positions after the stroke-play. The first placed team was drawn to play the quarter-final against the eight placed team, the second against the seventh, the third against the sixth and the fourth against the fifth. In each match between two nation teams, two 18-hole foursome games and five 18-hole single games were played. Teams were allowed to switch players during the team matches, selecting other players in to the afternoon single games after the morning foursome games. Games all square after 18 holes were declared halved, if the team match was already decided.

The four teams placed 9–12 in the qualification stroke-play formed Flight B and the four teams placed 13–16 formed flight C, to play similar knock-out play to decide their final positions.

== Teams ==
A record number of 16 nation teams contested the event. Finland and Iceland took part for the first time. Each team consisted of six players.

Players in the leading teams

Country	Players
England	Kitrina Douglas, Linda Bayman, Beverley New, Penny Grice, Jill Thornhill, Claire Waite
France	Eliane Berthét, Karine Espinasse, Marie-Laure de Lorenzi, Cécilia Mourgue d'Algue, Corine Soules, M. L. Zivy
Ireland	Claire Dowling Hourihane, Eavan Higgins, Maureen Madill, Mary McKenna, Carol Wickham, Philomena Wickham
Scotland	Wilma Aitken, Fiona Anderson, Jane Connachan, Belle Robertson, Gillian Stewart, Pam Wright
Spain	Carmen Maestre, Maria Orueta, Macarena Tey, Maria Castilla, Vicky Pertierra
Sweden	Helen Alfredsson, Eva Dahlöf, Hillevi Hagström, Viveca Hoff, Liselotte Neumann, Anna Oxenstierna
Wales	Audrey Briggs, M. Rawlings, Vicki Thomas, J. Richards, Sharon Roberts, Tegwen Thomas
West Germany	Imma Bockelmann, Susanne Knödler, Martina Koch. Astrid Peter, Elizabeth Peter, Ines Umsen

Other participating teams

Country
Belgium
Denmark
Finland
Iceland
Italy
Netherlands
Norway
Switzerland

== Winners ==
West Germany and Spain tied the lead at the opening 36-hole qualifying competition, with a score of 34 over par 764, with West Germany winning by the tie-breaking better total non-counting scores.

Tied individual leaders in the 36-hole stroke-play competition was Claire Hourihane, Ireland, and 17-year-old Liselotte Neumann, Sweden, each with a score of 1-over-par 147, one stroke ahead of Gillian Stewart, Scotland. Hourihane scored a new course record of 4 under par 69 in the first round.

Ireland, a combined team from the Republic of Ireland and Northern Ireland, won the gold, earning their second title in the last three championships, beating team England in the final 5 1/2–1 1/2. Defending champions Sweden earned third place, beating West Germany 5–2 in the bronze match.

== Results ==
Qualification round

Team standings

Place	Country	Score	To par
T1	West Germany *	382-382=764	+34
T1	Spain	380-384=764	+34
3	Scotland	386-381=767	+37
T4	England *	381-389=770	+40
T4	France *	391-379=770	+40
T4	Ireland	384-386=770	+40
7	Sweden	387-389=776	+46
8	Wales	394-387=781	+51
9	Italy	392-396=788	+58
10	Denmark	789	+59
11	Switzerland	793	+63
12	Netherlands	797	+67
13	Belgium	812	+82
14	Finland	857	+127
15	Norway	865	+135
16	Iceland	908	+178

* Note: In the event of a tie the order was determined by the better total non-counting scores.

Individual leaders

Place	Player	Country	Score	To par
T1	Claire Hourihane	Ireland	69-78=147	+1
T1	Liselotte Neumann	Sweden	73-74=147	+1
2	Gillian Stewart	Scotland	72-76=148	+2
4	Marie-Laure de Lorenzi	France	74-75=149	+3
5	Eliane Berthét	France	71-79=150	+5
5	Jane Connachan	Scotland	74-77=151	+5
5	Susanne Knödler	West Germany	75-76=151	+5
5	Martina Koch	West Germany	74-77=151	+5
5	Mary McKenna	Ireland	74-77=151	+5
5	Vicky Pertierra	Spain	75-76=151	+5
5	Astrid Peter	West Germany	77-74=151	+5
5	Macarena Tey	Spain	76-75=151	+5

Note: There was no official award for the lowest individual score.

Flight A

Bracket

Quarter finals
Sweden	5
Spain	2
Ireland	4
Scotland	3
England	4
France	3
West Germany	5
Wales	2

Semi finals
Ireland	5
Sweden	2
England	5
West Germany	2

Final
Ireland	5.5
England	1.5
Bronze match
Sweden	5
West Germany	2

Elimination matches
France	4
Wales	3
Scotland	5
Spain	2

Match for 5th place
Scotland	4.5
France	2.5
Match for 7th place
Spain	4
Wales	3

Final games

Ireland	England
5.5	1.5
C. Hourihane / P. Wickham 4 & 2	J. Thornhill / L. Denison Bender Bayman
M. McKenna / E. Higgins 19th hole	B. New / C. Waite
Claire Hourihane 2 & 1	Jill Thornhill
Mary McKenna 2 & 1	Linda Denison Bender Bayman
Maureen Madill 1 hole	Penny Grice
Carol Wickham	Beverly New 5 & 4
Eavan Higgins AS *	Kitrina Douglas AS *

* Note: Game declared halved, since team match already decided.

Flight B

Elimination matches
Switzerland	4
Denmark	3
Italy	6
Netherlands	1

Match for 9th place
Switzerland	4
Italy	3
Match for 11th place
Denmark	4
Netherlands	3

Flight C

Elimination matches
Norway	4
Finland	3
Belgium	7
Iceland	0

Match for 13th place
Belgium	7
Norway	0
Match for 15th place
Finland	4.5
Iceland	2.5

Final standings

Place	Country
1st place, gold medalist(s)	Ireland
2nd place, silver medalist(s)	England
3rd place, bronze medalist(s)	Sweden
4	West Germany
5	Scotland
6	France
7	Spain
8	Wales
9	Switzerland
10	Italy
11	Denmark
12	Netherlands
13	Belgium
14	Norway
15	Finland
16	Iceland

== See also ==
- Espirito Santo Trophy – biennial world amateur team golf championship for women organized by the International Golf Federation.
- European Amateur Team Championship – European amateur team golf championship for men organised by the European Golf Association.
