= Eva Dahllöf =

Swedish professional golfer (born 1965)

Personal information
- Full name: Eva Ingeborg Dahllöf
- Nationality: Sweden
- Born: 4 July 1965 (age 61) Örnsköldsvik, Sweden
- Height: 5 ft 5 in (1.65 m)

Career
- Sport: Golf
- College: Oklahoma State University
- Turned professional: 1990
- Former tours: LPGA Tour (joined 1993); Ladies European Tour (joined 1991)

Best results in LPGA major championships
- Chevron Championship: T57: 2000
- Women's PGA C'ship: T33: 2002
- U.S. Women's Open: T52: 2005
- du Maurier Classic: T67: 2000

Eva Ingeborg Dahllöf (born 4 July 1965) is a Swedish professional golfer who played 17 seasons on the LPGA Tour.

== Early life and amateur career ==
Dahllöf started playing golf at the age of 9 with her father Kjell and mother Gun at Örnsköldsvik Golf Club in the province of Ångermanland in Sweden.

At age 12, she won the 1977 Norrland Ladies' Championship (the championship representing the geographical northern half of Sweden) over 72 holes at her home course.

In April 1983, Dahlöf won the French Junior Open Match-play Championship for the Esmond Trophy at Golf de Saint-Cloud outside Paris, beating Claire Waite, England, on the first extra hole of the final match. Later in 1983, not yet 18 years old, Dahlöf won over future professional major winners Liselotte Neuman and Helen Alfredsson in an important junior tournament in Sweden, JC Open at Varberg Golf Club. She bet Alfredsson in a play-off with Neuman finishing one stroke behind in the 54-hole tournament.

Sister of elite ice hockey player Håkan Dahlöf, she played ice hockey for MoDo Hockey before moving to Stockholm in late 1983 to focus on golf.

1985-1989, she played collegiate golf at Oklahoma State University, Stillwater, Oklahoma, capturing six individual titles and was awarded All-America honors on three occasions, graduated with a Bachelor of Science focused in Health & Wellness.

She represented Sweden five times in a row at the European Lady Junior's Team Championship, first time only 16 years old, being part of the winning team twice, 1982 and 1984. She also played for Sweden in the European Ladies' Team Championship three times in a row, the last time, in 1987 at Turnberry, Scotland, her team won the championship.

She competed in the 1986 and 1988 amateur team worlds Esporito Santo Trophy for Sweden, where her team in 1988 finished runner-up, one stroke behind United States, and Dahlöf herself finished 4th individually.

== Professional career ==
Dahllöf turned professional 1990 and competed for two years on the Ladies European Tour prior to joining the 1993 LPGA Tour on her fourth LPGA qualification attempt, finishing the 1992 LPGA Final Qualifying Tournament tied for 29th. She returned to the LPGA Final Qualifying Tournament to earn non-exempt status in 1996 (tied for 33rd) and exempt status in 1993 (tied for 20th), 1995 (tied for 14th), 1997 (tied for eighth), 2000 (won a six-way playoff for the final exempt spot) and 2004 (tied for seventh).

Her LPGA career-best was a tie for fifth at the 2008 MasterCard Classic in Morelia, Mexico, three strokes behind winner Louise Friberg, followed by four ties for sixth, in 1998 at the Mercury Titleholders Championship and in 1999 at the Australian Ladies Masters, Standard Register PING and State Farm Rail Classic. She carded eight rounds of 66, at the first round of the 1998 Mercury Titleholders Championship, at the second round of the 1999 Philips Invitational, the first round of the 2001 Subaru Memorial of Naples, the second round of the 2001 Kathy Ireland Championship, the first and final rounds of the 2004 Welch's/Fry's Championship, the third round of the 2007 Navistar LPGA Classic, and in the first round of the 2008 Jamie Farr Owens Corning Classic.

Dahllöf recorded a hole-in-one during the third round of the 1998 Star Bank LPGA Classic and another during the second round of the 2009 CN Canadian Women's Open.

== Amateur wins ==
- 1977 Norrland Championship
- 1982 MoDo Open (Örnsködsvik GC)
- 1983 French Open Junior Match-play Championship, The Golf Match (Ljunghusen GC), JC Open Junior (Varberg GC)

== LPGA Tour career summary ==
| Year | Tournaments played | Money list rank | Earnings ($) | Scoring average | Scoring rank | Top 10s | Best finish |
|---|---|---|---|---|---|---|---|
| 1993 | 16 | 140 | 10,370 | 74.28 | 131 | – | T30 |
| 1994 | 23 | 133 | 16,403 | 73.90 | 113 | – | T26 |
| 1995 | 21 | 121 | 26,939 | 74.24 | 127 | – | T11 |
| 1996 | 22 | 136 | 18,829 | 74.53 | 138 | – | T35 |
| 1997 | 21 | 126 | 35,738 | 73.13 | 95 | – | T15 |
| 1998 | 24 | 79 | 85,225 | 72.71 | 81 | 1 | T6 |
| 1999 | 28 | 52 | 169,052 | 72.01 | 49 | 4 | T6×3 |
| 2000 | 26 | 108 | 69,046 | 73.48 | 112 | 1 | T10 |
| 2001 | 15 | 119 | 42,567 | 72.79 | 85 | – | T17 |
| 2002 | 20 | 108 | 52,704 | 73.68 | 111 | – | T21 |
| 2003 | 19 | 96 | 65,590 | 73.22 | 100 | – | T14 |
| 2004 | 21 | 116 | 49,253 | 73.07 | 95 | – | T12 |
| 2005 | 19 | 118 | 40,667 | 74.45 | 125 | – | T23 |
| 2006 | 15 | 103 | 67,642 | 72.58 | 65 | – | T19 |
| 2007 | 17 | 94 | 80,918 | 73.27 | 75 | – | T11 |
| 2008 | 21 | 99 | 103,260 | 73.30 | 104 | 1 | T5 |
| 2009 | 17 | 112 | 53,551 | 73.22 | 104 | – | T14 |
| Total | 345 | | 987,754 | | | 7 | T5 |

== Team appearances ==
Amateur

- European Lady Junior's Team Championship (representing Sweden): 1981, 1982 (winners), 1983, 1984 (winners), 1986
- European Ladies' Team Championship (representing Sweden): 1983, 1985, 1987 (winners)
- Espirito Santo Trophy (representing Sweden): 1986, 1988
