= Ladies' British Open Amateur Stroke Play Championship =

Tournament information
- Location: United Kingdom
- Established: 1969
- Organised by: The R&A
- Format: Stroke play
- Month played: September
- Final year: 2017

Final champion
- (Sweden) Linn Grant

Ladies' British Open Amateur Stroke Play Championship was founded in 1969 by the Ladies' Golf Union (now merged into The R&A) of Great Britain.

A stroke play tournament over 72 holes, it was discontinued by the R&A after the 2017 tournament won by Linn Grant in favour of a new Girls U16 Amateur Championship.

Notably, in 2000 Rebecca Hudson won the Ladies' British Open Amateur Championship match play title as well as the Ladies' British Open Amateur Stroke Play Championship. Leona Maguire, at age 16, was the youngest player to win the event.

== Winners ==
Year	Winner	Score	Margin of victory	Runner(s)-up	Venue	Ref.
2017	(Sweden) Linn Grant	288	3 strokes	(England) Hannah Screen (Northern Ireland) Annabel Wilson	North Berwick Golf Club	
2016	(England) Sophie Lamb	291	2 strokes	(Wales) Chloe Williams	Knock Golf Club	
2015	(India) Aditi Ashok	285	5 strokes	(Republic of Ireland) Olivia Mehaffey	Moortown Golf Club	
2014	(England) Meghan MacLaren	292	1 stroke	(England) Sarah-Jane Boyd	Ashburnham Golf Club	
2013	(China) Jing Yan	282	2 strokes	(Scotland) Gemma Dryburgh	Prestwick Golf Club	
2012	(England) Sarah-Jane Boyd	294	2 strokes	(Wales) Amy Boulden	Shandon Park Golf Club	
2011	(Republic of Ireland) Leona Maguire	288	6 strokes	(Belgium) Laurence Herman	Royal Ashdown Forest Golf Club	
2010	(Scotland) Pamela Pretswell	218	3 strokes	(Wales) Amy Boulden	Tenby Golf Club	
2009	(Republic of Ireland) Danielle McVeigh	304	1 stroke	(England) Hannah Turland	Royal Aberdeen Golf Club	
2008	(Scotland) Roseanne Niven	288	Playoff	(Scotland) Kylie Walker	Malone Golf Club	
2007	(England) Melissa Reid	290	1 stroke	(England) Florentyna Parker	Conwy Golf Club	
2006	(Italy) Anna Rossi	290	1 stroke	(England) Rachel Bell	Prince's Golf Club	
2005	(Scotland) Heather MacRae	288	Playoff	(Austria) Nicole Gergely	Nairn Golf Club	
2004	(Scotland) Clare Queen	294	Playoff	(Wales) Stephanie Evans (England) Shelley McKevit	Alwoodley Golf Club	
2003	(England) Shelley McKevitt	306	1 stroke	(Scotland) Lynn Kenny	Royal Portrush Golf Club	
2002	(Wales) Becky Brewerton	291	3 strokes	(Scotland) Clare Queen	Hunstanton Golf Club	
2001	(England) Rebecca Hudson	300	2 strokes	(Northern Ireland) Alison Coffey	Kilmarnock (Barassie) Golf Club	
2000	(England) Rebecca Hudson	294	5 strokes	(Scotland) Heather Stirling	Royal County Down Golf Club	
1999	(Wales) Becky Brewerton	294	Playoff	(Switzerland) Niloufar Azam	Huddersfield Golf Club	
1998	(Netherlands) Nienke Nijenhuis	297	1 stroke	(Wales) Becky Morgan	Stirling Golf Club	
1997	(Denmark) Karen Margrethe Juul	293	3 strokes	(England) Elaine Ratcliffe	Silloth on Solway Golf Club	
1996	(Denmark) Christina Kuld	289	4 strokes	(England) Elaine Ratcliffe	Conwy Golf Club	
1995	(Spain) Maria José Pons	289	3 strokes	(England) Elaine Ratcliffe	Prince's Golf Club	
1994	(England) Kirsty Speak	297	2 strokes	(Republic of Ireland) Eileen Rose Power	Woodhall Spa Golf Club	
1993	(England) Julie Hall	290	6 strokes	(New Zealand) Lynnette Brooky	Gullane Golf Club	
1992	(England) Joanne Hockley	287	3 strokes	(England) Rachel Bolas	Frilford Heath Golf Club	
1991	(England) Joanne Morley	297	2 strokes	(Scotland) Janice Moodie	Long Ashton Golf Club	
1990	(Wales) Vicki Thomas	287	1 stroke	(Republic of Ireland) Claire Hourihane	Strathaven Golf Club	
1989	(England) Helen Dobson	298	2 strokes	(Australia) Nadene Hall	Southerness Golf Club	
1988	(England) Karen Mitchell	317	2 strokes	(Republic of Ireland) Mary McKenna (England) Julie Wade	Royal Porthcawl Golf Club	
1987	(England) Linda Bayman	297	2 strokes	(England) Jill Thornhill (England) Nicola Way	Ipswich Golf Club	
1986	(Republic of Ireland) Claire Hourihane	298	Playoff	(England) Trish Johnson	Blairgowrie Golf Club	
1985	(Scotland) Belle Robertson	305	4 strokes	(United States) Cindy Scholefield	Formby Golf Club	
1984	(England) Claire Waite	285	2 strokes	(Republic of Ireland) Mary McKenna	Conwy Golf Club	
1983	(England) Alison Nicholas	292	2 strokes	(Scotland) Jane Connachan	Moortown Golf Club	
1982	(Scotland) Jane Connachan	294	5 strokes	(Canada) Barbara Bunkowsky (England) Claire Waite	Downfield Golf Club	
1981	(England) Janet Soulsby	300	2 strokes	(Scotland) Jane Connachan	Royal Norwich Golf Club	
1980	(Northern Ireland) Maureen Madill	304	Playoff	(Scotland) Pamela Wright	Brancepeth Castle Golf Club	
1979	(Republic of Ireland) Mary McKenna	305	2 strokes	(Wales) Vicki Rawlings	Moseley Golf Club	
1976–1978: Contested as Women's British Open
1975	(England) Julia Greenhalgh	298	3 strokes	(Scotland) Suzanne Cadden	Northumberland Golf Club	
1974	(England) Julia Greenhalgh	302	3 strokes	(Wales) Tegwen Perkins	Seaton Carew Golf Club	
1973	(England) Anne Stant	298	3 strokes	(England) Mary Everard	Ipswich Golf Club	
1972	(Scotland) Belle Robertson	296	1 stroke	(England) Michelle Walker	Silloth on Solway Golf Club	
1971	(Scotland) Belle Robertson	302	3 strokes	(England) Mary Everard	Ayr Belleisle Golf Club	
1970	(England) Mary Everard	313	2 strokes	(England) Frances Smith	Royal Birkdale Golf Club	
1969	(England) Ann Irvin	295	9 strokes	(England) Dinah Oxley	Northumberland Golf Club	

== See also ==
- Ladies' British Open Amateur Championship
