= Joanne Furby =

English professional golfer

Personal information
- Full name: Joanne Catherine Furby
- Nationality: England
- Born: 16 March 1969 (age 57) England

Career
- Sport: Golf
- Turned professional: 1989
- Former tour: Women Professional Golfers' European Tour

Joanne Catherine Furby (born 16 March 1969) is an English professional golfer. She won the 1987 English Women's Amateur Championship and the Ladies' British Open Amateur Championship in 1988. She turned professional in early 1989.

== Golf career ==
Furby won the 1987 English Women's Amateur Championship at Alwoodley Golf Club, beating Maria King 4&3 in the final. She had finished second in the stroke-play qualification stage. Later in 1987 she won the Smyth Salver as the leading amateur in the Women's British Open, nine strokes behind winner Alison Nicholas. In 1988 she won the Ladies' British Open Amateur Championship at Royal Cinque Ports, beating Julie Wade 4&3 in the final.

Furby played for England in the 1987 European Ladies' Team Championship and in the Women's Home Internationals in 1987 and 1988.

Furby turned professional at the start of 1989, to play on the Women Professional Golfers' European Tour. She was later the professional at Blackwell Grange Golf Club in Darlington.

== Team appearances ==
- European Ladies' Team Championship (representing England): 1987
- Women's Home Internationals (representing England): 1987 (winners), 1988
- Girls Home Internationals (representing England): 1986 (winners)
