= Volvo Open =

Golf tournament in Sweden

Tournament information
- Location: Sweden
- Established: 1970
- Format: Stroke play
- Final year: 1971

Final champion
- (Australia) Kel Nagle

The Volvo Open was an invitational golf tournament played in Sweden in 1970 and 1971. It was the first major international golf tournament played in Sweden.

The 1970 event was played on two courses; the first 36 holes at the par 71 course at Delsjö Golf Club near Gothenburg on Wednesday and Thursday and the final 36 holes at the par 72 course at Drottningholm Golf Club near Stockholm on Saturday and Sunday. The participation of Jack Nicklaus, visiting Sweden for the second year in a row after an exhibition there in 1969, were the big attraction and he finished second, one stroke behind winner Jean Garaïalde. Other world well-known players taking part were Peter Thomson and Lanny Wadkins.

The 1971 event was also played on two courses, the first 36 holes at the par 71 links course at Falsterbo Golf Club in the very south of Sweden and the final 36 holes at the par 72 course at Lysegården Golf Club, north of Gothenburg. The tournament took place at the same time as the Dunlop Masters which meant that only a few of the leading British golfers took part. The tournament was won by 50-year-old Kel Nagle. Other well-known participants were Doug Sanders and Hubert Green.

Two years later, in 1973, the first European Tour tournament in Sweden, the Scandinavian Enterprise Open took place for the first time.

== Winners ==
Year	Winner	Score	To par	Margin of victory	Runner-up	Winner's share (SEK)	Venue(s)	Ref
1970	(France) Jean Garaïalde	67-69-71-70=277	−5	1 stroke	(United States) Jack Nicklaus	40,000	Delsjö GK and Drottningholms GK	
1971	(Australia) Kel Nagle	72-71-75-68=286	E	1 stroke	(Republic of Ireland) Christy O'Connor Snr	40,000	Falsterbo GK and Lysegårdens GK	
