= Astor Trophy =

Tournament information
- Established: 1959
- Format: Team match play

Current champion
- New Zealand

The Astor Trophy is a women's team golf tournament between teams of amateurs golfers from Great Britain and Ireland, Australia, Canada, New Zealand and South Africa. It has been played every four years since 1959. From its foundation until 2007 it was called the Commonwealth Trophy. South Africa did not compete from 1963 to 1991. While it was called the Commonwealth Trophy, Irish golfers were not eligible. The trophy was presented by Nancy Astor, Viscountess Astor.

== Format ==
Each team plays the other four teams. Two matches are played each day, the tournament lasting five days. Each match is contested over one day with foursomes in the morning and singles in the afternoon.

In 2019 there were four players in each team. Each match consisted of two foursomes and four singles. Previously there were five players in each team and each match consisted of two foursomes and five singles. The winner of the match receives 1 point while in a tied match each side receives ½ point. The cup is decided by the number of team matches won. In the event of a tie the order is decided by the number of individual matches won, including a half point for each halved match. If the team are still tied then the cup is tied.

== Results ==
Year	Dates	Venue	Winners	Ref
2019	28 Aug –1 Sep	Royal Colwood Golf Club, Canada	New Zealand	
2015	12–16 Jan	The Grange Golf Club, Australia	Australia	
2011	15–19 Jun	Fairhaven Golf Club, England	Great Britain & Ireland	
2007	7–11 May	Royal Johannesburg Golf Club, South Africa	Great Britain	
2003	4–8 Nov	Remuera Golf Club, New Zealand	Australia	
1999	30 Aug – 3 Sep	Marine Drive Golf Club, Canada	Australia	
1995	4–8 Sep	Royal Sydney Golf Club, Australia	Australia	
1991	6–8 Jun	Northumberland Golf Club, England	Great Britain	
1987	22–24 Oct	Christchurch Golf Club, New Zealand	Canada	
1983	11–13 Aug	Glendale Golf and Country Club, Canada	Australia	
1979	27–29 Sep	Lake Karrinyup Golf Club, Australia	Canada	
1975	26–28 Jun	Ganton Golf Club, England	Great Britain	
1971	23–25 Sep	St Andrews of Hamilton, New Zealand	Great Britain	
1967	3–5 Aug	Hamilton Golf and Country Club, Canada	Great Britain	
1963	8–10 Aug	Royal Melbourne Golf Club, Australia	Great Britain	
1959	2–6 Jun	Old Course at St Andrews, Scotland	Great Britain	

South Africa did not compete from 1963 to 1991.

== Teams ==
=== Australia ===
- 1959 Pat Borthwick, Burtta Cheney, Joan Fletcher, Mardi Mair, Margaret Masters
- 1963 Pat Borthwick, Diana Cross, Joan Fletcher, Margaret Masters, Judith Percy
- 1967 Carole Blair, Barbara Coulson, Betty Dalgleish, Marea Hickey, Dianna Thomas
- 1971 Lindy Goggin, June Howe, Dianna Thomas, Sandra Williams, Rhys Wright
- 1975 Anne Alletson, Vicki Jellis, Jane Lock, Sandra McCaw, Marea Parsons
- 1979 Jane Crafter, Edwina Kennedy, Jane Lock, Sandra McCaw, Karen Permezel
- 1983 Louise Briers, Corinne Dibnah, Lindy Goggin, Edwina Kennedy, Diane Pavich
- 1987 Louise Briers, Lindy Goggin, Edwina Kennedy, Ericka Maxwell, Alison Munt
- 1991 Louise Briers, Wendy Doolan, Sarah Gautrey, Edwina Kennedy, Jane Shearwood
- 1995 Tanya Holl, Anne-Marie Knight, Kate MacIntosh, Allison Wheelhouse, Simone Williams
- 1999 Helen Beatty, Tamie Durdin, Sandy Grimshaw, Rebecca Stevenson, Lindsey Wright
- 2003 Misun Cho, Sarah Kemp, Sarah-Jane Kenyon, Rochelle Miles, Anna Parsons
- 2007 Emma Bennett, Frances Bondad, Stephanie Na, Helen Oh, Sunny Park
- 2011 Breanna Elliott, Emma de Groot, Minjee Lee, Ashley Ona, Cathleen Santoso
- 2015 Gennai Goodwin, Hannah Green, Becky Kay, Jenny Lee, Shelly Shin
- 2019 Amelia Grohn, Kirsty Hodgkins, Emily Mahar, Stacey White

=== Canada ===
- 1959 Judy Darling, Mary Gay, Rae Milligan, Roma Neundorf, Marlene Streit
- 1963 Betty Cole, Judy Darling, Gayle Hitchens, Rae Milligan, Marlene Streit
- 1967 Helene Gagnon, Gail Hitchens, Gail Harvey Moore, Marilyn Palmer, Marlene Streit
- 1971 Gayle Borthwick, Jocelyne Bourassa, Betty Cole, Gail Moore, Marilyn Palmer
- 1975 Susie Conklin, Sue Higgs, Liz Hoffman, Debbie Savoy, Dale Shaw
- 1979 Michele Guilbault, Gail Moore, Marilyn O'Connor, Marlene Streit, Stacey West
- 1983 Dawn Coe, Patty Grant, Cheryll Gibb, Mary Ann Hayward, Marlene Streit
- 1987 Gail Anderson, Audrey Bendick, Cathy Burton, Judy Medlicott, Jennifer Wyatt
- 1991 Evelyn Biron, Marie-Josee Desbiens, Lorie Kane, Mary Ann Lapointe, Terrill Samuel
- 1995 Kelly Doohan, Anna-Jane Eathorne, Tracey Lipp, Kareen Qually, Aileen Robertson
- 1999 Isabelle Blais, Laura Henderson, Mary Ann Lapointe, Jessica Luciuk, Kareen Qually
- 2003 Veronique Drouin, Mary Ann Lapointe, Laura Matthews, Eom-ji Park, Terrill Samuel
- 2007 Isabelle Blais, Laura Henderson, Jessica Luciuk, Laura Matthews, Kareen Qually
- 2011 Rebecca Lee-Bentham, Anne-Catherine Tanguay, Nicole Vandermade, Jessica Wallace, Christine Wong
- 2015 Michelle Kim, Naomi Ko, Alisha Lau, Jaclyn Lee, Grace St-Germain
- 2019 Noémie Paré, Mary Parsons, Brooke Rivers, Emily Zhu

=== Great Britain (and Ireland) ===
- 1959 Bridget Jackson, Elizabeth Price, Janette Robertson, Frances Smith, Marley Spearman
- 1963 Julia Greenhalgh, Ruth Porter, Frances Smith, Marley Spearman, Sheila Vaughan
- 1967 Liz Chadwick, Ann Irvin, Bridget Jackson, Dinah Oxley, Vivien Saunders
- 1971 Mary Everard, Jill Hutton, Dinah Oxley, Belle Robertson, Michelle Walker
- 1975 Julia Greenhalgh, Ann Irvin, Jenny Lee-Smith, Tegwen Perkins, Anne Stant
- 1979 Sue Hedges, Maureen Madill, Tegwen Perkins, Vicki Rawlings, Gillian Stewart
- 1983 Jane Connachan, Gillian Stewart, Vicki Thomas, Jill Thornhill, Claire Waite
- 1987 Janet Collingham, Karen Davies, Susan Shapcott, Vicki Thomas, Jill Thornhill
- 1991 Elaine Farquharson, Linzi Fletcher, Julie Hall, Catriona Lambert, Vicki Thomas
- 1995 Julie Hall, Mhairi McKay, Janice Moodie, Alison Rose, Lisa Walton
- 1999 Kim Andrew, Fiona Brown, Rebecca Hudson, Anne Laing, Becky Morgan
- 2003 Anna Highgate, Lynn Kenny, Anne Laing, Shelley McKevitt, Kate Phillips
- 2007 Krystle Caithness, Naomi Edwards, Breanne Loucks, Melissa Reid, Kerry Smith
- 2011 Amy Boulden, Holly Clyburn, Kelsey MacDonald, Pamela Pretswell, Kelly Tidy
- 2015 Hayley Davis, Connie Jaffrey, Bronte Law, Charlotte Thomas, Chloe Williams
- 2019 Alice Hewson, Lily May Humphreys, Olivia Mehaffey, Emily Toy

=== New Zealand ===
- 1959 Nicki Campbell, Susan Grigg, VS Land, Jean Mangan, Aileen Nash
- 1963 Susan Grigg, Pat Harrison, Jean Mangan, Natalie White, Una Wickham
- 1967 Heather Booth, Wendy Bryant, Jane Little, Glennis Taylor, Natalie White
- 1971 Dawn Blake, Heather Booth, Marilyn Smith, Glennis Taylor, Jean Whitehead
- 1975 Gillian Bannan, Sue Bishop, Sue Boag, Liz Douglas, Frances Pere
- 1979 Janice Arnold, Liz Douglas, Cherry Kingham, Brenda Rhodes, Heather Ryan
- 1983 Janice Arnold, Liz Douglas, Debbie Randell, Brenda Rhodes, Jan Scandrett
- 1987 Jan Cooke, Liz Douglas, Tracey Hanson, Brenda Ormsby, Debbie Smith
- 1991 Lisa Aldridge, Jan Higgins, Marnie McGuire, Kerryn Starr, Annette Stott
- 1995 Shelley Duncan, Catherine Knight, Gina Scott, Pam Sowden, Kerryn Starr
- 1999 Lisa Aldridge, Wendy Hawkes, Tina Howard, Catherine Knight, Pam Sowden
- 2003 Enu Chung, Penny Newbrook, Sarah Nicholson, Jenny Park, Stacey Tate
- 2007 Tammy Clelland, Larissa Eruera, Yeon Song Kim, Dasom Lee, Penny Smith
- 2011 Julianne Alvarez, Chantelle Cassidy, Cecilia Cho, Lydia Ko, Emily Perry
- 2015 Julianne Alvarez, Alanna Campbell, Chantelle Cassidy, Munchin Keh, Wenyung Keh
- 2019 Julianne Alvarez, Amelia Garvey, Wenyung Keh, Carmen Lim

=== South Africa ===
- 1959 Jeanette Burd, Mary Clemence, Rita Easton, Jackie Mercer, Jean Tindall
- 1995 Claudette Beukes, Lara Lipworth, Sanet Marais, Barbara Plant, Wendy Warrington
- 1999 not known
- 2003 Esme Behrens, Lee-Anne Pace, Ashleigh Simon, Tanica van As, Sandra Winter
- 2007 Kelli Shean, Ashleigh Simon, Bertine Strauss, Gina Switala, Iliska Verwey
- 2011 Tiffany Avern-Taplin, Henriëtte Frylinch, Bertine Strauss, Iliska Verwey, Kim Williams
- 2015 Lora Assad, Michaela Fletcher, Eleonora Galletti, Ivanna Samu, Bertine Strauss
- 2019 Kiera Floyd, Caitlyn Tate Macnab, Kaleigh Telfer, Kaylah Williams

== Similar events ==
In 1973, Australia hosted a similar tournament, the Women's International Series, at Royal Sydney, played from 27 to 31 October. Five teams competed, Australia, Canada, Great Britain and Ireland, Japan and New Zealand. Australia won the event with 3 wins ahead of New Zealand.

- Australia: Gayle Flynn, Lindy Goggin, Vicki Jellis, Jane Lock
- Canada: Liz Hoffman, Marilyn Palmer, Dale Shaw, Barbara Turnbull
- Great Britain and Ireland: Linda Denison-Pender, Mary Everard, Ann Irvin, Carol Le Feuvre, Maisey Mooney
- Japan Takako Kiyomoto, Michiko Tachibana, Machiko Yamada, Shinako Yoshimochi
- New Zealand: Gillian Bannon, Sue Boag, Sue Hamilton, Frances Pere, Sue Ritchie
