= Women's Senior Amateur =

The Women's Senior Amateur
Tournament information
- Location: United Kingdom
- Established: 1981
- Organised by: The R&A (Previously the Ladies Golf Union)
- Format: 72-hole stroke play
- Month played: September

Current champion
- (United States) Lara Tennant

The Women's Senior Amateur, also known as the Ladies' Senior British Open Amateur Championship, is a golf tournament organised annually by The R&A. The championship is open to players aged 50 years and over, and was first played in 1981. In 2022 the event was played over 72 holes, having previously been over 54 holes, although it was played over 36 holes up to 1995.

In the past 25 years, both Angela Uzielli (1998 and 1999) and Eva Ansgarius (2004 and 2005) have managed to successfully defend their titles. Uzielli won the championship a record six times in the 1990s.

The winner is awarded the Clark Trophy, which was presented to the Ladies Golf Union by Linda Clark.

== Winners ==
Year	Venue	Winner	Score	Runner(s)-up	Ref.
2026	Frilford Heath	(United States) Lara Tennant	298	(England) Emma Brown	
2025	Walton Heath	(United States) Kathy Hartwiger	297	(Republic of Ireland) Tracy Eakin	
2024	Saunton	(Australia) Nadene Gole	311^{PO}	(England) Jackie Foster	
2023	Woodhall Spa	(England) Jackie Foster	297	(England) Emma Brown (Australia) Nadene Gole	
2022	Royal Dornoch	(Canada) Terrill Samuel	309	(United States) Lara Tennant	
2021	Ashridge	(England) Aileen Greenfield	229^{PO}	(England) Catherine Rawthore	
2020	No tournament due to the COVID-19 pandemic				
2019	Royal St David's	(United States) Lara Tennant	222	(Belgium) Sylvie Van Molle	
2018	Crail	(Republic of Ireland) Laura Webb	140 (Note: Tournament reduced to 36 holes due to adverse weather conditions.)	(England) Catherine Rawthore	
2017	Royal Belfast	(Spain) Macarena Campomanes	218	(Australia) Sue Wooster	
2016	Caldy	(Republic of Ireland) Laura Webb	219	(England) Julie Brown	
2015	Prestatyn	(England) Julie Brown	225	(Republic of Ireland) Gertie McMullen	
2014	Royal Dornoch	(England) Catherine Rawthore	227	(Scotland) Mary Smith	
2013	Royal Portrush	(Wales) Ann Lewis	160	(Finland) Minna Kaarnalahti (Republic of Ireland) Sheena McElroy	
2012	Hunstanton	(England) Katherine Russell	234^{PO}	(Republic of Ireland) Pat Doran	
2011	Belvoir Park	(England) Felicity Christine	230	(Republic of Ireland) Pat Doran	
2010	West Kilbride	(England) Beverley New	235	(Republic of Ireland) Pat Doran	
2009	Pyle & Kenfig	(Wales) Vicki Thomas	232	(England) Rozalyn Adams	
2008	Hilton Templepatrick	(Germany) Chris Utermarck	231^{PO}	(England) Susan Dye	
2007	Copt Heath	(Canada) Alison Murdoch	229	(England) Rozalyn Adams (England) Christine Quinn	
2006	Dumfries & County	(England) Christine Quinn	224	(Sweden) Viveca Hoff	
2005	Newport	(Sweden) Eva Ansgarius	226	(Sweden) Viveca Hoff	
2004	Portstewart	(Sweden) Eva Ansgarius	246	(England) Ruth Lindley	
2003	South Staffs	(Sweden) Christina Birke	226	(England) Sue Pidgeon	
2002	Longniddry	(England) Ros Page	229	(Sweden) Christina Birke	
2001	Aberdovey	(Republic of Ireland) Mary McKenna	230	(England) Ros Page	
2000	West Kilbride	(Denmark) Birthe Mogensen	242	(Canada) Diane Williams	
1999	Malone	(England) Angela Uzielli	229	(Republic of Ireland) Valerie Hassett	
1998	Powfoot	(England) Angela Uzielli	227	(Republic of Ireland) Valerie Hassett	
1997	Frilford Heath	(United States) Toni Wiesner	231	(Republic of Ireland) Valerie Hassett	
1996	Pyle & Kenfig	(Republic of Ireland) Valerie Hassett	236	(England) Angela Uzielli	
1995	Blairgowrie	(England) Angela Uzielli	152	(Canada) Diane Williams	
1994	Notts Ladies	(Canada) Diane Williams	154	(England) Jill Thornhill	
1993	Ashburnham	(England) Jill Thornhill	155	(England) Hilary Kaye (England) Angela Uzielli	
1992	Stratford-upon-Avon	(England) Angela Uzielli	148	(England) Catherine Bailey	
1991	Ladybank	(England) Angela Uzielli	154	(England) Catherine Bailey	
1990	Harrogate	(England) Angela Uzielli	153	(England) Anne Thompson	
1989	Wrexham	(England) Catherine Bailey	149	(England) Ann Howard (England) Juliet Morgan	
1988	Littlestone	(England) Catherine Bailey	156	(England) Prue Riddiford	
1987	Copt Heath	(France) Odile Semelaigne	152	(England) Bridget Jackson	
1986	Longniddry	(England) Prue Riddiford	154	(England) Catherine Bailey	
1985	Prestatyn	(Republic of Ireland) Gerry Costello	158	(England) Anne Biggs (England) Prue Riddiford	
1984	Woodbridge	(France) Odile Semelaigne	152	(England) Prue Riddiford	
1983	Troon Portland	(England) Margaret Birtwistle	167	(England) Prue Riddiford	
1982	Ilkley	(England) Prue Riddiford	161	(England) Brenda King	
1981	Formby Ladies'	(England) Brenda King	159	(England) Peggy Carrick (England) Jean McIntyre	

== Future venues ==
- 2025 – Walton Heath Golf Club
- 2027 - Blairgowrie Golf Club

== See also ==
- U.S. Senior Women's Amateur
- European Senior Ladies' Championship
