= 1988 Espirito Santo Trophy =

Tournament information
- Dates: 8–11 September
- Location: Stockholm, Sweden; 59°19′18″N 017°53′10″E
- Course: Drottningholm Golf Club
- Organized by: World Amateur Golf Council
- Format: 72 holes stroke play

Statistics
- Par: 73
- Length: 6,014 yards (5,499 m)
- Field: 27 teams 81 players

Champion
- United States; Anne Quast Sander, Pearl Sinn, Carol Semple Thompson
- 587 (+3)
- Location in Sweden Location in Stockholm

The 1988 Espirito Santo Trophy took place 8–11 September at Drottningholm Golf Club in Stockholm, Sweden. The club was later renamed the Royal Drottningholm Golf Club, named from the palace close to the course, the Drottningholm Palace, home of the Swedish king and queen. The course, laid out on crown property, opened in 1959 in a park and woodland area about 15 kilometres (9 miles) from midtown Stockholm. For this championship, the course was set up as the women's championship course with par 73.

It was the 13th women's golf World Amateur Team Championship for the Espirito Santo Trophy. The tournament was a 72-hole stroke play team event with 27 team entries, each with three players. The best two scores for each round counted towards the team total.

The United States team won the Trophy, earning the title for the tenth time, beating the hosting country team Sweden by one stroke. Sweden earned the silver medal while the combined team of Great Britain & Ireland took the bronze on third place another twelve strokes back.

Anne Quast Sander, playing in the United States team, was a member of the winning team for a tied record third time, in 1988 at 51 years of age and 24 years after her first win in 1966 (at the time known as Anne Quast Welts). Her second win came in 1968. The only other women to have won the Espirito Santo Trophy three times is Jane Bastanchury Booth, who was a member of the winning U.S. team in 1968, 1970 and 1972.

== Teams ==
27 teams entered the event and completed the competition. Each team had three players.

Country	Players
Argentina	Dolores Nava, Maria Eugenia Noguerol, Nora Ventureira
Australia	Louise Briers, Elizabeth Cavill, Nicole Lowien
Belgium	Isabelle De Clercq, Sylvie Clausset, Aline Van Der Haegen
Bermuda	Judithanne Astwood-Outerbridge, Madeline Joell, Sherley Wildi
Brazil	Luciana Benvenuti, Elisabeth Nickhorn, Cristina Schmitt
Canada	Audrey Bendick, Joyce McAvoy, Terill Samuel
Chile	Ana Maria Cambiaso, Isabel Santa Maria, Beatriz Steeger
China	Tseng Hsiu-Feng, Liao Yueh-Hsiu, Tai Yu-Chuan
Colombia	Rocio Fonseca, Adriana Gomez, Sibile Suarez
Denmark	Maren Binau, Mette Brandt-Andersen, Pernille Carlson
Finland	Outi Eriksson, Sanna Kahiluoto, Marika Soravuo
France	Delphine Bourson, Caroline Bourtayre, Valérie Golléty-Pamard
(United Kingdom) Great Britain & Ireland	Linda Bayman, Susan Shapcott, Julie Wade
Iceland	Karen Saervarsdotir, Steinum Saemundsdotir, Asgerdur Sverrisdotir
Italy	Marina Buscaini, Isabella Calogero, Stefania Croce
Japan	Michiko Hattori, Chie Kihara, Asoko Kita
Mexico	Adriana Garcia, Ana Luisa Hernandez, Florencia Rols
Netherlands	Mette Hageman, Barbara Van Strien, Dagmar De Vries
New Zealand	Jan Cooke Higgins, Liz Douglas, Ingrid Van Steenbergen
Norway	Anette Bech, Vibeke Stensrud, Elizabeth Vinter
Portugal	Teresa Abecassis, Graca Medina, Patricia Roquette
Spain	Macarena Campomanes, Mari Carmen Navarro, Maria Orueta
Sweden	Helen Alfredsson, Helene Andersson, Eva Dahllöf
Switzerland	Irene Dubs, Evelyn Orley, Marie Christine De Werra
United States	Anne Quast Sander, Pearl Sinn, Carol Semple Thompson
Venezuela	Maria Eugenia Larrazabal, Angeles De Perez, Graciela De Plaza
West Germany	Ursula Beer, Tina Fischer, Martina Koch

== Results ==
Place	Country	Score	To par
1st place, gold medalist(s)	United States	147-144-148-148=587	+3
2nd place, silver medalist(s)	Sweden	146-146-153-143=588	+4
3rd place, bronze medalist(s)	(United Kingdom) Great Britain & Ireland	149-155-148-148=600	+16
T4	Italy	147-153-146-157=603	+19
T4	Japan	157-152-151-143=603	+19
T4	Switzerland	153-151-154-143=603	+19
7	West Germany	150-154-160-142=606	+22
8	Netherlands	157-148-157-149=611	+27
T9	New Zealand	154-155-150-154=613	+29
T9	France	156-150-156-151=613	+29
11	Australia	152-155-156-151=614	+30
T12	Canada	152-151-160-152=620	+36
T12	Denmark	156-153-160-152=620	+36
T12	Spain	152-154-153-161=620	+36
T15	Brazil	154-154-157-156=621	+37
T15	China	162-154-156-149=621	+37
17	Belgium	159-152-163-152=626	+42
18	Mexico	161-153-159-157=630	+46
19	Argentina	158-160-158-155=631	+47
20	Colombia	156-165-163-157=641	+57
21	Norway	166-165-161-159=651	+67
22	Finland	173-159-165-157=654	+70
23	Chile	166-165-163-166=660	+76
24	Venezuela	162-172-167-164=665	+81
25	Iceland	163-166-166-172=667	+83
26	Bermuda	173-174-163-167=677	+93
27	Portugal	170-169-174-168=681	+97

== Individual leaders ==
There was no official recognition for the lowest individual scores.

Place	Player	Country	Score	To par
T1	Stefania Croce	Italy	71-73-71-78=293	+1
T1	Carol Semple Thompson	United States	71-75-75-72=293	+1
T3	Eva Dahllöf	Sweden	71-74-82-68=295	+3
T3	Michiko Hattori	Japan	76-78-74-67=295	+3
T3	Martina Koch	West Germany	72-78-76-69=295	+3
T3	Marie Christine De Werra	Switzerland	85-79-78-75=295	+3
7	Pearl Sinn	United States	76-71-73-76=296	+4
8	Helene Andersson	Sweden	75-73-76-75=299	+7
T9	Helen Alfredsson	Sweden	75-73-77-75=300	+8
T9	Aline Van Der Haegen	Belgium	77-71-80-72=300	+8
