= Vicki Thomas =

Welsh amateur golfer

Personal information
- Nationality: Wales
- Born: 27 October 1954 (age 72) Northampton, England

Career
- Sport: Golf
- Status: Amateur

Vicki Thomas (née Rawlings, born 27 October 1954) is a Welsh amateur golfer. She played in six successive Curtis Cup matches from 1982 to 1992. She won the Welsh Ladies' Amateur Championship eight times and the Welsh Women's Open Stroke Play Championship five times.

== Golf career ==
Thomas won the Welsh Girls' Championship in 1973, beating Tegwen Perkins at the 19th hole. She competed for Wales in the Girls Home Internationals from the inaugural event in 1969, when she was 14, to 1973. She made her debut for Wales in the Women's Home Internationals in 1971 and the European Ladies' Team Championship from 1973. However she made little impact outside Wales until 1979, although she was runner-up in 1977 Newmark International at Woodhall Spa, nine strokes behind the winner, Dinah Henson.

In 1979 Thomas won the Welsh Ladies' Amateur Championship and was runner-up in the Ladies' British Open Amateur Stroke Play Championship, two strokes behind Mary McKenna. She also played in the Vagliano Trophy and then in the Commonwealth Trophy in Australia. Despite her good performance in 1979 she was not selected for the 1980 Curtis Cup team, being second reserve.

Competing as Vicki Thomas, she was runner-up in the 1980 Welsh Women's Open Stroke Play Championship, a stroke behind Tegwen Thomas. The following year, 1981, she won the event, six strokes ahead of Tegwen Thomas. In 1982 Thomas retained the Welsh stroke play title, won the Welsh Ladies' Amateur Championship for the second time and was runner-up in the Spanish International Ladies Amateur Championship. She also made her first appearance in the Curtis Cup.

Thomas was runner-up in the 1984 Helen Holm Scottish Women's Open Championship, seven strokes behind Gillian Stewart, and in 1985 she reached the semi-finals of the British Ladies Amateur. In 1986 she reached the semi-finals of the Australian Women's Amateur, while in 1987 she won the Mellsop Cup, the New Zealand amateur stroke-play championship. In 1990 she won the Ladies' British Open Amateur Stroke Play Championship, a stroke ahead of Claire Hourihane. and she was a runner-up in the 1993 Irish Women's Amateur Open Championship. She won the Welsh Ladies' Amateur Championship eight times between 1979 and 1994, reaching her 11th final in 1996. She also won the Welsh Women's Open Stroke Play Championship for a third time in 1989. In 2009 she won the Women's Senior Amateur.

Thomas played in six successive Curtis Cup matches and also played in the Vagliano Trophy six times, the Commonwealth Trophy four times and the Espirito Santo Trophy in 1990. She represented Wales in the Women's Home Internationals for 28 consecutive years from 1971 to 1998 and also represented Wales regularly in the European Ladies' Team Championship.

== Personal life ==
Thomas has two younger sisters, Kerri (born 1957) and Mandy (born 1964) who were also Welsh international golfers. She was inducted into the Welsh Sports Hall of Fame in 1998.

== Team appearances ==
- Curtis Cup (representing Great Britain & Ireland): 1982, 1984, 1986 (winners), 1988 (winners), 1990, 1992 (winners)
- Vagliano Trophy (representing Great Britain & Ireland): 1979 (tied), 1983 (winners), 1985 (winners), 1987 (winners), 1989 (winners), 1991 (winners)
- Commonwealth Trophy (representing Great Britain): 1979, 1983, 1987, 1991 (winners)
- Espirito Santo Trophy (representing Great Britain & Ireland): 1990
- European Ladies' Team Championship (representing Wales): 1973, 1975, 1977, 1979, 1981, 1983, 1985, 1987, 1989, 1991, 1993, 1995, 1997, 1999
- Women's Home Internationals (representing Wales): 1971, 1972, 1973, 1974, 1975, 1976, 1977, 1978, 1979, 1980, 1981, 1982, 1983, 1984, 1985, 1986, 1987, 1988, 1989, 1990, 1991, 1992, 1993, 1994, 1995, 1996, 1997, 1998
- Girls Home Internationals (representing Wales): 1969, 1970, 1971, 1972, 1973
