= Angela Uzielli =

English amateur golfer

Personal information
- Full name: Angela Mary Uzielli
- Nationality: England
- Born: 1 February 1940 Swanton Morley, Norfolk, England
- Died: 4 November 1999 (aged 59)

Career
- Sport: Golf
- Status: Amateur

Angela Mary Uzielli (née Carrick; 1 February 1940 – 4 November 1999) was an English amateur golfer. She won the 1977 British Ladies Amateur, the 1990 English Women's Amateur Championship and won the Women's Senior Amateur six times in the 1990s. She played in the 1978 Curtis Cup.

== Golf career ==
In 1968, Uzielli reached the final of the Wills Women's National Match Play, losing to New Zealander Heather Booth in the final. Uzielli won the 1977 British Ladies Amateur at Hillside Golf Club, beating Vanessa Marvin 6&5 in the final. She won the English Women's Amateur Championship in 1990 at the age of 50, beating Linzi Fletcher in the final. She had been a runner-up in 1976, losing to Lynne Harrold. Playing with Wilma Aitken she won the Avia Foursomes in 1982. She was also three times a runner-up in the event, in 1977, 1979 and 1988. Uzielli won the Women's Senior Amateur six times in the 1990s, in 1990, 1991, 1992, 1995, 1998 and 1999.

In 1977 she was in the English team that won the European Ladies' Team Championship in Spain. Later in the year she played for Great Britain & Ireland in the Vagliano Trophy in Sweden. In 1978 she played in the Curtis Cup match at The Apawamis Club in the United States.

== Personal life ==
Born Angela Carrick she married John Uzielli. Her mother, Peggy Carrick, was also an amateur golfer. Uzielli died of a heart attack in 1999.

== Team appearances ==
- Curtis Cup (representing Great Britain & Ireland): 1978
- Vagliano Trophy (representing Great Britain & Ireland): 1977 (winners)
- European Ladies' Team Championship (representing England): 1977 (winners)
- Women's Home Internationals (representing England): 1976 (winners), 1977 (winners), 1978 (winners), 1990
