= Pamela Wright =

Scottish golfer (born 1964)

Personal information
- Nationality: Scotland
- Born: 26 June 1964 (age 62) Scotland
- Height: 5 ft 5 in (1.65 m)

Career
- Sport: Golf
- College: Arizona State University
- Turned professional: 1988
- Former tours: Ladies European Tour; LPGA Tour (1989–2004)

Best results in LPGA major championships
- Chevron Championship: T8: 1992
- Women's PGA C'ship: T14: 1989
- U.S. Women's Open: T9: 1992
- du Maurier Classic: T3: 1991
- Women's British Open: CUT: 2001

Achievements and awards
- LPGA Rookie of the Year: 1989

Pamela Wright (born 26 June 1964) is a Scottish professional golfer. She played on the Ladies European Tour and LPGA Tour. Wright played on the European Solheim Cup team in 1990, 1992 and 1994.

== Golf career ==
Wright lost to Maureen Madill in a playoff for the 1980 Ladies' British Open Amateur Stroke Play Championship, after taking a bogey 5 at the first extra hole. She played for the Great Britain & Ireland team in the 1981 Vagliano Trophy. In 1982 she met Jane Connachan in the final of the Scottish Women's Amateur Championship, losing at the 19th hole. In 1985 she won the Helen Holm Scottish Women's Open Championship by two strokes from Belle Robertson. Wright played collegiate golf at Arizona State University and was All-American Second team in 1987 and All-American and All-Conference First team in 1988.

She was a member of the European Solheim Cup team in 1990, 1992 and 1994.

== Personal life ==
Wright is the daughter of Innes, who was a golf professional in Aboyne, Scotland and Janette, a leading Scottish amateur golfer.

== Team appearances ==
Amateur

- Vagliano Trophy (representing Great Britain & Ireland): 1981
- European Ladies' Team Championship (representing Scotland) 1981, 1983, 1985, 1987
- Women's Home Internationals (representing Scotland): 1981, 1982, 1983, 1984
- Girls Home Internationals (representing Scotland): 1979, 1980

Professional

- Solheim Cup (representing Europe): 1990, 1992 (winners), 1994
