= Martina Koch (golfer) =

German professional golfer

Personal information
- Nationality: Germany
- Born: 28 August 1965 (age 61) Graz, Austria
- Life partner: Erik Schumacher

Career
- Sport: Golf
- College: University of Arizona
- Turned professional: 1994
- Former tour: Ladies European Tour
- Professional wins: 1

Number of wins by tour
- Ladies European Tour: 1

Martina Koch (born 28 August 1965 in Graz) is a German professional golfer. She won the European Ladies Amateur Championship twice and the Austrian Ladies Open on the Ladies European Tour.

== Career ==
Koch's father was a golf coach and started teaching her at age 7. In 1981 she finished 4th at the German Amateur Championship and in 1982 she was German Junior Champion.

Koch represented her National Team in the Espirito Santo Trophy five times between 1984 and 1994. She arrived at the University of Arizona as the reigning European women's amateur champion, having won the inaugural title in 1986 and again in 1990. As a freshman she was ranked in the top five nationally and was named All-Pac-10 and All-American. She went on to become an All-American selection four years running, the first four time All-American in University of Arizona women's golf history. At the Pac-10 championships she finished 13th in 1988, third in 1989 and runner-up in 1990. She received the 1990 Pac-10 medal as University of Arizona's outstanding female student athlete. She later received a master's degree in golf course architecture from Kansas State University.

In 1996, Koch won her maiden title on the Ladies European Tour, the Austrian Ladies Open, by two strokes over New Zealander Lynnette Brooky. She was only the second German winner on the LET, after Barbara Helbig in 1983. Koch finished 1996 in 25th place on the Order of Merit.

== Amateur wins ==
- 1986 European Ladies Amateur Championship
- 1990 European Ladies Amateur Championship

== Professional wins ==
=== Ladies European Tour wins (1) ===
No.	Date	Tournament	Winning score	Margin of victory	Runners-up
1	30 Jun 1996	Glashütte Ladies' Austrian Open	213 (−6)	2 strokes	(New Zealand) Lynnette Brooky

=== Other wins ===
- 1984 German National Open Championship
- 1986 German National Open Championship
- 1994 German National Open Championship
- 1997 German National Open Championship

== Team appearances ==
Amateur

- Vagliano Trophy: (representing the Continent of Europe): 1983, 1985
- Espirito Santo Trophy (representing West Germany): 1984, 1986, 1988
- European Ladies' Team Championship (representing West Germany): 1983, 1985, 1989
- Espirito Santo Trophy (representing Germany): 1990, 1994
