= Royal Drottningholm Golf Club =

Golf club in Drottningholm, Sweden

- Location in Sweden
- 59°19′19.3″N 17°51′33.1″E

Club information
- Location: Ekerö Municipality, Stockholm County, Sweden
- Established: Royal charter 1959 by Gustaf VI Adolf
- Type: Private
- Tota holes: 18
- Tournaments: HP Open · Volvo Open · Scandinavian Enterprise Open
- Website: kdrgk.se

Tournament Course
- Designed by: Rafael Sundblom; Nils Sköld; Johan Benestam (2012)
- Par: 72

Royal Drottningholm Golf Club is a golf club located in Drottningholm, Stockholm County in Sweden. It has hosted tournaments both on the European Tour and the Ladies European Tour.

== History ==
The club was established in 1959 and received a royal charter from king Gustaf VI Adolf the same year. It is situated on the island Lovön in lake Mälaren in the outskirts of Stockholm adjacent to Drottningholm Palace, the residence of the Swedish royal family.

The course was designed by Rafael Sundblom and his associate Nils Sköld, and the king himself inaugurated the course 26 September 1959. The course was renovated 2010–2012 by Johan Benestam and the remodeled course was inaugurated by Prince Daniel, Duke of Västergötland in June 2012.

The club has hosted the Scandinavian Enterprise Open and Scandinavian Masters on the European Tour and as well as the HP Open on the Ladies European Tour. Prior to the establishment of the European Tour it hosted the Volvo Open in 1970, where Jean Garaïalde beat runner-up Jack Nicklaus by one stroke.

At the first edition of the Scandinavian Masters in 1991, Fred Couples scored a European Tour record 12 birdies in his second 18-hole round, shouting 61.

It has also hosted many amateur tournaments such as the 1988 Espirito Santo Trophy and the 2018 Annika Invitational Europe.

== Tournaments hosted ==
=== Pre-European Tour ===
- Volvo Open – 1970

=== European Tour ===
- Scandinavian Enterprise Open – 1973 · 1976 · 1977 · 1988 · 1989 · 1990
- Scandinavian Masters – 1991 · 1994

=== Ladies European Tour ===
- HP Open – 2003

=== Amateur ===
- Espirito Santo Trophy – 1988
- European Lady Junior's Team Championship – 1982
- European Senior Ladies' Team Championship – 2007
- Annika Invitational Europe – 2018

== See also ==
- List of golf clubs granted Royal status
- List of golf courses in Sweden
