= 1994 Solheim Cup =

Women's team golf competition

- Dates: October 21–23, 1994
- Venue: The Greenbrier
- Location: White Sulphur Springs, West Virginia
- Captains: JoAnne Carner (USA); Mickey Walker (Europe)
(United States)	13	7	(Europe)
- United States wins the Solheim Cup

Location map
- Location within the United States Location within West Virginia

The third Solheim Cup match took place from October 21 to October 23, 1994, at The Greenbrier in White Sulphur Springs, West Virginia, United States. The United States team regained the cup from the European team winning by 13 points to 7.

== Teams ==
Europe

- Mickey Walker (Captain) – England
- Helen Alfredsson – Gothenburg, Sweden
- Laura Davies – Coventry, England
- Lora Fairclough – Chorley, England
- Trish Johnson – Bristol, England
- Liselotte Neumann – Finspang, Sweden
- (England) Alison Nicholas – Gibraltar
- Catrin Nilsmark – Gothenburg, Sweden
- Dale Reid – Ladybank, Scotland
- Annika Sörenstam – Stockholm, Sweden
- Pam Wright – Torphins, Scotland

United States

- JoAnne Carner (Captain) – Kirkland, Washington
- Donna Andrews – Lynchburg, Virginia
- Brandie Burton – San Bernardino, California
- Beth Daniel – Charleston, South Carolina
- Tammie Green – Somerset, Ohio
- Betsy King – Reading, Pennsylvania
- Meg Mallon – Natick, Massachusetts
- Dottie Mochrie – Saratoga Springs, New York
- Kelly Robbins – Mt. Pleasant, Michigan
- Patty Sheehan – Middlebury, Vermont
- Sherri Steinhauer – Madison, Wisconsin

== Format ==
A total of 20 points were available. Day 1 was five rounds of foursomes. Day 2 was five rounds of fourballs. The final 10 points were decided in a round of singles matchplay. All ten golfers from each team played on each day.

== Day one foursomes ==
Friday, October 21, 1994

	Results
Alfredsson/Neumann	(United States) 3 & 2	Mochrie/Burton
Sörenstam/Nilsmark	(Europe) 1 up	Daniel/Mallon
Reid/Fairclough	(Europe) 2 & 1	Green/Robbins
Davies/Nicholas	(Europe) 2 up	Andrews/King
Johnson/Wright	(United States) 2 up	Sheehan/Steinhauer
3	Session	2
3	Overall	2

== Day two fourball ==
Saturday, October 22, 1994

	Results
Davies/Nicholas	(United States) 2 & 1	Mochrie/Burton
Sörenstam/Nilsmark	(United States) 6 & 5	Daniel/Mallon
Reid/Fairclough	(Europe) 4 & 3	Green/Robbins
Johnson/Wright	(United States) 3 & 2	Andrews/King
Alfredsson/Neumann	(Europe) 1 up	Sheehan/Steinhauer
2	Session	3
5	Overall	5

== Day three singles ==
Sunday, October 23, 1994

	Results
Helen Alfredsson	(Europe) 2 & 1	Betsy King
Catrin Nilsmark	(United States) 6 & 5	Dottie Mochrie
Trish Johnson	(United States) 1 up	Beth Daniel
Lora Fairclough	(United States) 4 & 2	Kelly Robbins
Pam Wright	(United States) 1 up	Meg Mallon
Alison Nicholas	(Europe) 3 & 2	Patty Sheehan
Laura Davies	(United States) 1 up	Brandie Burton
Annika Sörenstam	(United States) 3 & 2	Tammie Green
Dale Reid	(United States) 2 up	Sherri Steinhauer
Liselotte Neumann	(United States) 3 & 2	Donna Andrews
2	Session	8
7	Overall	13
