= 1992 Solheim Cup =

Women's team golf competition

- Dates: 2–4 October 1992
- Venue: Dalmahoy Country Club
- Location: Edinburgh, Scotland
- Captains: Mickey Walker (Europe); Kathy Whitworth / Alice Miller (USA)
(Europe)	11 1/2	6 1/2	(United States)
- Europe wins the Solheim Cup

Location map
- Location within Europe Location within Scotland

The second Solheim Cup golf match took place from 2 to 4 October 1992 at Dalmahoy Country Club, Edinburgh, Scotland. The European team beat the United States team 11 1/2 points to 6 1/2, to win the trophy for the first time.

== Teams ==
The US team captain, Kathy Whitworth had to return to the US before the start of the competition following the death of her mother the day the team arrived. LPGA President Alice Miller took over as captain.

Europe

- Mickey Walker (Captain) – England
- Helen Alfredsson – Gothenburg, Sweden
- Laura Davies – Coventry, England
- Florence Descampe – Brussels, Belgium
- Kitrina Douglas – England
- Trish Johnson – Bristol, England
- Liselotte Neumann – Finspang, Sweden
- (England) Alison Nicholas – Gibraltar
- Catrin Nilsmark – Gothenburg, Sweden
- Dale Reid – Ladybank, Scotland
- Pam Wright – Torphins, Scotland

United States

- Kathy Whitworth (Captain) – Monahans, Texas
- Danielle Ammaccapane – Babylon, New York
- Pat Bradley – Westford, Massachusetts
- Brandie Burton – San Bernardino, California
- Beth Daniel – Charleston, South Carolina
- Juli Inkster – Santa Cruz, California
- Betsy King – Reading, Pennsylvania
- Meg Mallon – Natick, Massachusetts
- Dottie Mochrie – Saratoga Springs, New York
- Deb Richard – Abbeville, Louisiana
- Patty Sheehan – Middlebury, Vermont

== Format ==
A total of 18 points were available. Day 1 was four rounds of foursomes. Day 2 was four rounds of fourballs. The final 10 points were decided in a round of singles matchplay, all ten golfers from each team playing on the final day.

== Day one foursomes ==
Friday, 2 October 1992

	Results
Davies/Nicholas	(Europe) 1 up	King/Daniel
Alfredsson/Neumann	(Europe) 2 & 1	Bradley/Mochrie
Descampe/Johnson	(United States) 1 up	Ammaccapane/Mallon
Reid/Wright	halved	Sheehan/Inkster
2 1/2	Session	1 1/2
2 1/2	Overall	1 1/2

== Day two fourball ==
Saturday, 3 October 1992

	Results
Davies/Nicholas	(Europe) 1 up	Sheehan/Inkster
Descampe/Johnson	halved	Burton/Richard
Reid/Wright	(United States) 1 up	King/Mallon
Alfredsson/Neumann	halved	Bradley/Mochrie
2	Session	2
4 1/2	Overall	3 1/2

== Day three singles ==
Sunday, 4 October 1992

	Results
Laura Davies	(Europe) 4 & 2	Brandie Burton
Helen Alfredsson	(Europe) 4 & 3	Danielle Ammaccapane
Trish Johnson	(Europe) 2 & 1	Patty Sheehan
Alison Nicholas	(United States) 3 & 2	Juli Inkster
Florence Descampe	(United States) 2 & 1	Beth Daniel
Pam Wright	(Europe) 4 & 3	Pat Bradley
Catrin Nilsmark	(Europe) 3 & 2	Meg Mallon
Kitrina Douglas	(United States) 7 & 6	Deb Richard
Liselotte Neumann	(Europe) 2 & 1	Betsy King
Dale Reid	(Europe) 3 & 2	Dottie Mochrie
7	Session	3
11 1/2	Overall	6 1/2
