= Maureen Madill =

Personal information
- Full name: Maureen Elizabeth Jane Madill
- Nationality: Northern Ireland
- Born: 1 February 1958 (age 68) Coleraine, Northern Ireland

Career
- Sport: Golf
- Turned professional: 1986
- Former tour: Ladies European Tour

Maureen Elizabeth Jane Madill (born 1 February 1958) is a professional golfer, coach and broadcaster. Her married name is Garner.

Madill was born in Coleraine, Northern Ireland.

== Golf career ==
Madill won the British Ladies Amateur Golf Championship in 1979 and the British Ladies Amateur Stroke Play Championship in 1980. She represented Great Britain and Ireland in the Curtis Cup in 1980, and later coached the team between 1998 and 2004.

Madill turned professional in 1986 and played on the Ladies European Tour until 1996 where she had limited success, recording two runner-up finishes – the 1989 British Women's Matchplay and the 1990 Haninge Open.

== Media work ==
Madill has also worked for BBC Sport as a commentator, covering several events including the Scottish Open, the PGA Championship, and The Open. Madill has also worked as a commentator with Sky Sports Golf.

== Team appearances ==
=== Amateur ===
- European Ladies' Team Championship (representing Ireland): 1979 (winners), 1983 (winners)
- Vagliano Trophy (representing Great Britain & Ireland): 1979 (tie, retained trophy), 1981, 1985 (winners)
- Curtis Cup (representing Great Britain & Ireland): 1980
- Espirito Santo Trophy (representing Great Britain & Ireland): 1980
- Commonwealth Trophy (representing Great Britain): 1979
