= Gaëtan Mourgue d'Algue =

French golfer (1939–2026)

Gaëtan Mourgue d'Algue (1 June 1939 – 28 September 2026) was a French golfer. He was a resident of Saint-Nom-la-Bretèche, west of Paris, France, who helped popularize the then little played sport of golf in the country during the early 1960s.

== Early years ==
His father Pierre, a scratch player, had him hitting his first shots at the age of 8, and at 15 he was playing for his country and became one of the finest French players of his generation. He was a member of Golf de Saint-Nom-la-Bretèche, since the foundation of the club and opening of its two 18-hole courses in 1959.

== Amateur career ==
Mourgue d'Algue reached the final of the French Open Amateur Championship four times in five years 1962–1966 and won the title three times, two of them at Chantilly, north of Paris. Following that, he won the French Amateur Native Championship two years in a row, 1967–1968, the last time at his home course at Saint-Nom-la-Bretèche. He also won the Biarritz Cup twice, in 1957 and in 1961.

He played four times with the Continent of Europe team for the St Andrews Trophy and represented France three times at the World Men's Amateur Team Championships, the Eisenhower Trophy.

== Personal life and death ==
In 1967, he married Cécilia Perslow, who was the Swedish golf champion two years earlier. She later came to represent France in the European Ladies' Team Championship and the Espirito Santo Trophy and in later life won the individual European Senior Ladies' Championship six times. Their daughter, Kristel Mourgue d'Algue, represented France three times at the Espirito Santo Trophy. After winning the individual NCAA Division I Women's Golf Championships in America, she turned professional and played on the Ladies European Tour.

His relative Jacques Mourgue d'Algue in 1966 married Florence du Pasquier, an elite golfer who was a member of the winning French team at the 1969 European Ladies' Team Championship.

At the professional level, Gaëtan Mourgue d'Algue moved into the publication business, creating the magazine Golf Européen. He also published the original Peugeot Guide to Europe's top 1000 courses and subsequently went on with Rolex to do the same with the World's top 1000.

By convincing Pierre Menet, the chairman of the Lancôme Company, to establish the Trophée Lancôme, he enticed some of the world's best players to come to Saint-Nom-la-Bretèche and compete. In partnership with Mark McCormack at IMG, he established the Tour de las Américas in 1979.

Mourgue d'Algue was also the instigator of several golf courses: Joyenval, near Paris, France, Limère in the Loire Valley, France, Arcangues in southwest France and Abidjan on the Ivory Coast.

He was a member of The Royal and Ancient Golf Club of St Andrews, Scotland, Golf de Saint-Nom-la-Bretèche, France and honorary member of the Golf de Chantilly and Joyenval, France. In the 1980s, he was a member of the AMIIC (World Association for Real Estate Investment and Construction) Club, in Geneva, alongside prominent figures such as Pierre Salinger, François Spoerry, Paul-Loup Sulitzer and Jean-Pierre Thiollet.

Mourgue d'Algue died on 28 September 2026, at the age of 87.

== Amateur wins ==
- 1962 French Amateur Open Championship
- 1965 French Amateur Open Championship
- 1966 French Amateur Open Championship
- 1967 French Amateur Native Championship
- 1968 French Amateur Native Championship

== Team appearances ==
Amateur

- European Amateur Team Championship (representing France): 1959, 1961, 1963, 1965
- St Andrews Trophy (representing the Continent of Europe): 1962, 1964, 1966, 1968
- Eisenhower Trophy (representing France): 1964, 1966, 1968
