= Macarena Campomanes =

Spanish amateur golfer

Personal information
- Full name: Macarena Campomanes Eguiguren
- Nationality: Spain
- Born: 1964 (age 61–62) Madrid, Spain
- Children: 3

Career
- Sport: Golf
- Status: Amateur
Medal record
Mediterranean Games
Bronze medal – third place	1991 Athens	Women's team

Macarena Campomanes (born c. 1964) is a Spanish amateur golfer. She won the Espirito Santo Trophy in 1986 and 1992, and won the European Senior Ladies' Championship in 2016, 2018 and 2019.

== Career ==
Campomanes was born in Madrid and grew up on a golf course owned by her father. She had a successful amateur career and won the 1984 Portuguese Ladies Amateur and the 1993 French Ladies Amateur, but never had any plans of turning pro, instead she got married and wanted to raise her three children. Her daughter Macarena Basagoiti is also a golfer and attended Erskine College in South Carolina, where she played on the golf team.

Campomanes won the Espirito Santo Trophy twice, first 1986 in Caracas, Venezuela with Mary Carmen Navarro and Maria Orueta, and again in 1992 in Vancouver, Canada together with Estefania Knuth and Laura Navarro. She won bronze at the 1991 Mediterranean Games in Athens, Greece in the team event together with Amaya Arruti and Esther Valera.

Upon coming of eligible age in 2015, Campomanes started competing in senior women's amateur events, and placed in the top three at the European Senior Ladies' Championship for five straight years 2015–2019, winning the event three times. In 2017, she won The R&A's Ladies' Senior British Open Amateur Championship at Royal Belfast Golf Club, finishing on a five-over-par 218, five shots ahead of Sue Wooster of Australia and with the defending champion Laura Webb in third place. The win qualified her for the 2018 U.S. Senior Women's Open at Chicago Golf Club, won by Laura Davies.

In 2019, she won four titles, which helped her rise to No. 1 in the World Senior Women's Golf Ranking, where she stayed for over 65 weeks.

Campomanes co-captained the winning European teams at the Junior Ryder Cup in 1999 and 2002, and captained the Continent of Europe in the Vagliano Trophy on three occasions.

== Amateur wins ==
- 1984 (1) Portuguese Ladies Amateur
- 1993 (1) French Ladies Amateur
- 2016 (1) European Senior Ladies' Championship
- 2017 (1) Ladies' Senior British Open Amateur Championship
- 2018 (1) European Senior Ladies' Championship
- 2019 (4) European Senior Ladies' Championship, Spanish International Senior Ladies' Championship, Campeonato de España Senior, Czech International Senior Amateur Championship
- 2021 (1) Spanish International Senior Ladies' Championship

== Team appearances ==
Amateur

- European Lady Junior's Team Championship (representing Spain): 1982, 1983
- European Ladies' Team Championship (representing Spain): 1989, 1993, 1999
- Vagliano Trophy (representing the Continent of Europe): 1989
- Espirito Santo Trophy: (representing Spain): 1986 (winners), 1988, 1992 (winners)
- European Senior Ladies' Team Championship: (representing Spain): 2018, 2019, 2021
