= European Senior Men's Championship =

European amateur golf championship

The European Senior Men's Championship is a European amateur golf championship for men over 50 (previously 55) organized by the European Golf Association.

The inaugural event was held in 1996, with 25 editions have been contested so far. It is now played annually in conjunction with the European Senior Ladies' Championship.

== Format ==
The championship is open to players aged above 50 years old.

The format of this competition consists of three rounds of stroke play, with a cut after the second round out of which the lowest 54 men's scores can qualify for the final round.

== Past results ==
Year	Venue, Location	Winner	Runner(s)-up	Third place	Ref
2024	Kikuoka Country Club, Luxembourg	(France) Rodrigo Lacerda Soares, 213	(Ireland) Joseph Lyons, 213	(Ireland) Declan O'Neill, 213	
2023	Douglas Golf Club, Ireland	(Ireland) Edward McCormack, 207	(Ireland) Alan Condren, 209 (Ireland) Jody Fanagen, 209	—N/a	
2022	Pärnu Bay Golf Links, Estonia	(England) James Crampton, 215	(Sweden) Mattias Pernheden, 218	(England) Edward Richardson, 219	
2021	Golf de Morfontaine, France	(Germany) Martin Birkholz, 210	(Republic of Ireland) Karl Bornemann, 211	(Sweden) Tord Nilsson, 211	
2020	Golf Club d'Hossegor, France	(Spain) Jacobo Cestino, 216	(France) Pierre Carpentier, 217	(Germany) Rainer Gödeke, 218	
2019	Golf Patriziale Ascona, Switzerland	(Sweden) Mattias Pernheden, 203	(England) Edward Richardson, 205	(Sweden) Thomas Nilsson, 207	
2018	Royal Bled GC, Slovenia	(Germany) Martin Birkholz, 222	(Sweden) Mattias Pernheden, 223	(Denmark) Tony Jensen, 225	
2017	GC Schloss Schönborn, Austria	(Switzerland) Markus Frank, 218	(Germany) Martin Birkholz, 220	(Sweden) Thomas Nilsson, 220	
2016	Pula Golf, Spain	(Republic of Ireland) Adrian Morrow, 217	(England) Clive Jones, 218	(Republic of Ireland) Karl Bornemann, 219	
2015	Pannonia G&CC, Hungary	(England) Clive Jones, 217	(Norway) Tore Sviland, 223	(England) Stephen East, 223	
2014	R.C.G. Puerta de Hierro, Spain	(England) Clive Jones, 221	(Germany) Christian Domin, 222	(Germany) Ulrich Schulte, 222	
2013	Estonian G&CC, Estonia	(Italy) Lorenzo Sartori, 217	(Switzerland) Markus Frank, 219	(Sweden) Hans Bäckkström, 220	
2012	Golf & Landclub Achensee, Austria	(Republic of Ireland) Adrian Morrow, 212	(Sweden) Tomas Persson, 213	(Netherlands) Bart Nolte, 217	
2011	Golf & Landclub Achensee, Austria	(Sweden) Tomas Persson, 212	(Germany) Hans-Günter Reiter, 212	(Norway) Knut Skabo, 219	
2010	Golf & Landclub Achensee, Austria	(Sweden) Mats Andersson, 218	(Sweden) Per Hildebrand, 218	(Sweden) Ernie Ahsberg, 219	
2009	Porto Carras, Greece	(Italy) Frederico Lang, 216	(Republic of Ireland) Maurice Kelly, 217	(Greece) Georgios Vafeiadis, 218	
2008	Oceanico (Pinhal), Portugal	(Republic of Ireland) Adrian Morrow, 211	(Republic of Ireland) Arthur Pierse, 214	(Republic of Ireland) Maurice Kelly, 219	
2007	Vilamoura (Old Course), Portugal	(United States) Norman Swenson, 216	(Republic of Ireland) Maurice Kelly, 219	(Spain) Miguel Preysler De La Riva, 221	
2006	Ribagolfe, Portugal	(Spain) Miguel Preysler De La Riva, 145	(Italy) Francesco Ghirardi, 148	(Republic of Ireland) Hugh Smyth, 150	
2005	Golf de Chantilly, France	(England) Roy Smethurst, 218	(Germany) Hans-Günter Reiter, 219	(France) Alexis Godillot, 222	
2004	La Baule, France	(Scotland) David J. Smith, 213	(England) Roy Smethurst, 213	(Sweden) Per Hildebrand, 218	
2003	Chantaco, France	(Scotland) David J. Smith, 216	(Spain) Luis Javier Trenor, 216	(England) Douglas Arnold, 216	
2002	La Manga Club, Spain	(England) Andrew Morrison, 212	(Scotland) David J. Smith, 221	(Germany) Veit Pagel, 223	
2001	Torremirona GC, Spain	(England) Graham Steel, 216	(Spain) Luis Javier Trenor, 219	(Republic of Ireland) Peter Cowley, 224	
2000	La Manga, Spain	(Germany) Hans-Hubert Giesen, 217	(France) Alexis Godillot, 219	(Germany) Klaus-Rudiger Bez, 222	
1999	Ascona Golf Club, Switzerland	(Germany) Hans-Jürgen Ecklebe, 216	(France) Alexis Godillot, 217	(Italy) Ernesto Brognieri, 221	
1998	Ascona Golf Club, Switzerland	(England) David G. Lane, 213	(Spain) Juan Sanchez, 218	(Germany) Hans Jürgen Ecklebe, 221	
1997	Ascona Golf Club, Switzerland	(Italy) Carlo Tadini, 147	(Germany) Klaus Boose, 149	(England) David G. Lane, 149	
1996	Royal Hague Golf Club, Netherlands	(England) D. Frame, 228	(Italy) Franco Gigliarelli, 228	(England) Gordon Edwards, 228	

== Nations Cup ==
From 2000 to 2006, a Nations Cup was contested. This was discontinued when a separate European Senior Men's Team Championship was introduced.

Year	Winner	Runner(s)-up	Third place
2005	England (298); G. Broster; H. Moxon; R. Smethurst	Ireland (304); M. F. Morris; M. Kelly; H. Mackeown; Italy (304); F. Lang; G. Vigna Suria; P Vigliani	(No third place awarded - duplicate runners-up)
2004	Scotland (290); H. Brown; D.J. Smith; B. Grieve	England (291); D. Arnold; D. Lane; R. Smethurst	Ireland (296); M.F. Morris; J. Murphy; I. Stewart
2003	Scotland (293); A.D. Ferguson; D.J. Smith; G. Steel	Germany (294); H-J. Ecklebe; H-H. Giesen; V. Pagel	Italy (296); A. Croze; V. Mandelli; L. Vigliani
2002	England (285); A. Morrison; R. Smethurst; R. Turner	Germany (292); H-H. Giesen, V. Pagel; U. Printzen	Scotland (302); A.D. Ferguson, B.R.N. Grieve; D.J. Smith
2001	Ireland (298); P. Cowley; D. Jackson; H. McKinney	Spain (299); L. Mora Argemi; J. Sanchez Herrero; L.J. Trenor	England (302); B.N. Dick; D. Lane; R. Smethurst
2000	Germany (293); H-J. Ecklebe; H-H. Giesen; J. Harder	France (299); R. Fontagnères; A. Godillot; G. Roumeas	England (3039; G. Clay; D. Lane; A. Waterson

== See also ==
- European Senior Ladies' Championship – corresponding EGA event for women
- U.S. Senior Amateur – corresponding USGA event
