= Royal Bled Golf Club =

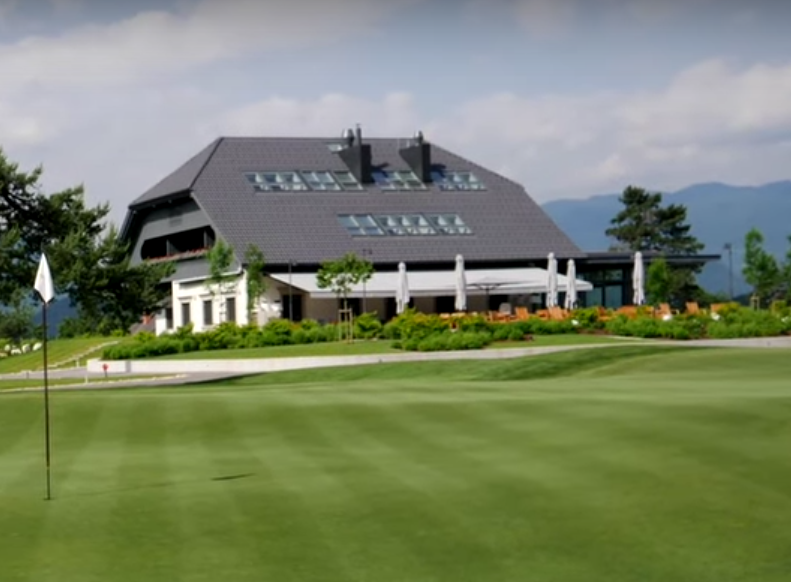

- Location in Slovenia
- 46.3720°N 14.1358°E

Club information
- Location: Bled, Slovenia
- Established: 1937, 89 years ago
- Type: Public
- Tota holes: 27
- Tournaments: Slovenian Open
- Website: royalbled.com/en/golf

King's Course
- Designed by: Rudolf von Gelmini (1936); Donald Harradine (1972); Howard Swan (2017)
- Par: 72
- Length: 7,275 yards (6,652 m)

Lake Course
- Designed by: Donald Harradine; Gerold Hauser (1995); Gunther Hauser (1995)
- Par: 36
- Length: 3,332 yards (3,047 m)

Royal Bled Golf Club (Slovene: Kraljevski Bled Golf Klub) is a 27-hole golf facility in the Municipality of Radovljica in the Upper Carniola region of Slovenia.

== History ==
The club is located in Bled, a small town surrounded by the dramatic mountains of the Julian Alps near the border with Austria, about 50 km (31 mi) northwest of the Slovenian capital of Ljubljana.

In the second half of the 19th century the historical town of Bled, famous for glacial Lake Bled and the iconic Bled Castle perched on a rock overlooking the lake, developed into a health resort, attracting nobility and wealthy guests from all across Europe. King Alexander I of Yugoslavia chose Bled as his summer residence in 1922, due to its mild climate.

Austrian Rudolf von Gelmini designed the original layout and in 1937 the first nine holes of the course was completed, marking the birth of golf in the region. In 1938 it became the only 18-hole course in Yugoslavia prior to the Second World War. After the outbreak of the WWII, the course was largely abandoned until its resurrection by Donald Harradine in 1972.

In 2014, Howard Swan was commissioned by new owners to bring the course up to modern standards while respecting the original heritage. In 2017, the King's course reopened after a 2-year renovation that saw considerable updates made to the original layout. At a combined 80th anniversary and re-opening ceremony, Princess Elizabeth of Yugoslavia hit the first ceremonial shot and bestowed Royal status upon the club.

The facility comprises the 7,275 yard 18-hole Championship King's Course, and the 3,332 yard 9-hole Lake Course.

In 2020, Golf Digest ranked the course the best in Slovenia.

== Notable tournaments hosted ==
The club has hosted both amateur and professional international championships, including the Slovenian Open.

=== Professional ===
Year	Tour	Tournament	Winner	Ref
1997	CHA	BTC Slovenian Open	(Sweden) Kalle Brink	
1998	CHA	BTC Slovenian Open	(England) Warren Bennett	
1999	CHA	BTC Slovenian Open	(Australia) Grant Dodd	

=== Amateur ===
- European Boys' Team Championship – 1997 · 2008
- European Mid-Amateur Men's Championship – 2005
- European Senior Men's Team Championship – 2007
- European Ladies' Team Championship – 2009
- European Senior Ladies' Team Championship – 2013
- European Senior Ladies' Championship – 2018
