= Cécilia Mourgue d'Algue =

French-Swedish amateur golfer (born 1946)

Personal information
- Full name: Ingeborg Cécilia Perslow Mourgue d'Algue
- Nationality: Sweden; France
- Born: 4 August 1946 (age 80) Sweden
- Spouse: Gaëtan Mourgue d'Algue
- Children: 2

Career
- Sport: Golf
- Status: Amateur

Ingeborg Cécilia Mourgue d'Algue (née Perslow) (born 4 August 1946, in Sweden) is a French-Swedish amateur golfer.

== Early life ==
Mourgue d'Algue, at the time named Cécilia Perslow, grew up playing golf with her parents Martin and Ingeborg at Örebro Golf Club, the 18-hole course situated outside Örebro in the province of Närke in the middle of Sweden. Her mother Ingeborg became the ladies' golf champion of both the club and the province.

In her teenage years, Perslow traveled between amateur tournaments in Sweden, often in a small car together with friend Liv Wollin, at the time the dominant female golfer in Sweden. Wollin and Perslow in 1966 came to meet in the final of the Swedish Match-play Championship when Perslow was the defending champion. Wollin won the match, despite it was played at Perslow's home course.

== Amateur career ==
Representing Sweden, at 18 years of age, she was the youngest competitor at the inaugural world amateur team championship, the 1964 Espirito Santo Trophy at Golf de Saint Germain, outside Paris in her future home country of France, of which she did not know at the time.

After winning the 1965 Swedish Amateur Match-play Championship, she also represented Sweden twice at the European Ladies' Team Championship, 1965 and 1967.

In April 1967, still a Swedish citizen only, she won the French International Lady Juniors Amateur Championship, in the semi-final beating Vivien Sounders, England, 4 and 2, who ten years later came to win the Women's British Open, and in the final beating Shirley Ward 2 and 1. The year before Perslow lost in the final against future major winner Catherine Lacoste,

After moving to France and becoming a French citizen, Mourgue d'Algue represented France at international amateur tournaments. She was a member and playing captain of the winning French team, with Delphine Bourson, Caroline Bourtayre, Sophie Louapre, Sandrine Mendiburu and Valérie Pamard, at the 1989 European Ladies' Team Championship in Pals, Spain, playing in the championship for the ninth time. The victory was decided when Mourgue d'Algue beat Helen Dobson, England, on the 19th hole.

In 1981, 15 years after they met in the final of the Swedish Championship, Morgue d'Algue and Wollin played on the winning side and together in the foursome matches for the Continent of Europe against Great Britain and Ireland at the Vagliano Trophy.

She represented France four times at the Espirito Santo Trophy. In 1986, 22 years after she represented Sweden in the same tournament, as well as in 1984, she served as a playing captain and led the French team to silver medals. In 1984, she also finished second in the individual tournament.

In 1994, at 48 years of age, Mourgue d'Algue finished runner-up at the Women's Amateur Championship, at the time named the British Ladies Amateur, at Newport Golf Club, England, losing in the final against Emma Duggleby, England 3 and 1. The year after, her 20 years old daughter Kristel achieved the same feat, losing in the final at Royal Portrush Golf Club, Northern Ireland.

After turning 50, Mourgue d'Algue was still competitive in regular amateur tournaments and won the 1996 French Amateur Championship, 31 years after her victory in the Swedish Championship. Before she finally won that late career victory, she had been runner-up at the French Amateur Championship four times, 1977, 1980, 1982 and 1985. In later life, Mourgue d'Algue won the individual European Senior Ladies' Championship, for ladies over 50 years of age, six times, the last time at the age of 65 in 2011.

== Personal life ==
In late 1966, she came to France, to play golf at Golf de Saint-Nom-la-Bretèche, west of Paris, for eight months. She practiced under instructing professional Henri Mourguillat, who also trained French stars of the time Gaëtan Mourgue d'Algue and Catherine Lacoste.

In September 1967, she married Gaëtan Mourgue d'Algue, one of the best French golf players of his generation, who won the French Amateur Native Championship twice and the French Amateur Open Championship three times and also was a person with great influence on the development of the sport of golf in France. He came to create the magazine Golf Européen and help to establish the Trophée Lancôme professional tournament.

Their daughter, Kristel Mourgue d'Algue, born 1973, represented France three times at the Espirito Santo Trophy and, like her mother, the Continent of Europe at the Vagliano Trophy. After winning the 1995 individual NCAA Division I Women's Golf Championships in United States, Kristel turned professional and played on the Ladies European Tour.

== Amateur wins ==
- 1965 Swedish Amateur Match-play Championship, Swedish International Stroke-play Championship
- 1967 French International Lady Juniors Amateur Championship
- 1977 Italian Amateur Open Championship
- 1978 French Amateur Open Match-play Championship
- 1981 French Amateur Open Match-play Championship
- 1982 French International Ladies Amateur Stroke-play Championship, Spanish International Ladies Amateur Championship
- 1984 Moroccan Amateur Open Championship
- 1986 French International Ladies Amateur Stroke-play Championship
- 1988 French International Ladies Amateur Stroke-play Championship
- 1991 French International Ladies Amateur Stroke-play Championship
- 1996 French Amateur Close Championship
- 1997 European Senior Ladies' Championship
- 2000 European Senior Ladies' Championship
- 2001 European Senior Ladies' Championship
- 2002 European Senior Ladies' Championship
- 2005 European Senior Ladies' Championship
- 2011 European Senior Ladies' Championship

== Team appearances ==
Amateur

- European Ladies' Team Championship (representing Sweden): 1965, 1967
- European Ladies' Team Championship (representing France): 1977, 1979, 1981, 1983, 1985, 1987, 1989 (winners), 1991
- Espirito Santo Trophy (representing Sweden): 1964
- Espirito Santo Trophy (representing France): 1980, 1982, 1984 (playing captain), 1986 (playing captain), 1988 (non-playing captain), 1990 (non-playing captain), 1992 (non-playing captain)
- Vagliano Trophy (representing the Continent of Europe): 1979 (tied), 1981 (winners),1985
- Nations Cup at the European Senior Ladies' Championship (representing France): 2001 (winners), 2002 (winners), 2005 (winners)
- European Senior Ladies' Team Championship (representing France): 2006 (winners), 2007 (winners), 2008, 2009, 2010, 2011 (winners)
