= 1961 European Amateur Team Championship =

Golf competition

Tournament information
- Dates: 20–25 July 1961
- Location: Brussels, Belgium; 50°49′N 4°29′E
- Course: Royal Golf Club de Belgique
- Organized by: European Golf Association
- Format: 36 holes stroke play round-robin system match play

Statistics
- Par: 73
- Length: 6,627 yards (6,060 m)
- Field: 10 teams circa 70 players

Champion
- Sweden; Johny Anderson, Gustaf Adolf Bielke, Ola Bergqvist, Gunnar Carlander, Lennart Leinborn, Magnus Lindberg, Bengt Möller
- Qualification round: 591 (+7) (2nd place); Flight A matches: 5 points
- Location in Europe Location in Belgium Location in Brussels

The 1961 European Amateur Team Championship took place 20 – 25 July on the Royal Golf Club de Belgique in Brussels, Belgium. It was the second men's golf European Amateur Team Championship.

== Venue ==
The championship took place at the Royal Golf Club de Belgique, the Royal Golf Club of Belgium, established in 1906 and situated in Tervuren on the Ravenstein Manor farm, 10 kilometers west of Brussels city center. The club hosted the professional tournament Belgian Open 13 times between 1910 and 1978.

=== Course layout ===
Hole	Meters	Par	Hole	Meters	Par
1	446	5	10	320	4
2	386	4	11	364	4
3	142	3	12	167	3
4	381	4	13	480	5
5	470	5	14	300	4
6	177	3	15	465	5
7	345	4	16	303	4
8	330	4	17	400	4
9	308	4	18	276	4
Out	2,985	36	In	3,075	37
Source:		Total		6,060	73

== Format ==
All participating teams played two qualification rounds of stroke-play, counting the four best scores out of six players for each team. The four best teams formed flight A. The next three teams formed flight B and the next three teams formed flight C.

The standings in each flight was determined by a round-robin system. All teams in the flight met each other and the team with most points for team matches in flight A won the tournament, using the scale, win=2 points, halved=1 point, lose=0 points. In each match between two nation teams, three foursome games and six single games were played.

== Teams ==
Ten nation teams contested the event. Each team consisted of a minimum of six players. England took part for the first time.

Players in the teams

Country	Players
Austria	Hugo Hild, Fritz Jonak, H. Harrer, P. Kyrle, Alexander Maculan, Klaus Nielich, W. Pollak, D. Usner
England	Gordon Clark, George Evans, Peter Green, David Moffat, David Neech, Dixon Rawlinson, Keith Warren
Belgium	Eddy Carbonelle, G. Leysen, Jacky Moerman, Freddy Rodesch, L. Velge, Philippe Washer, R. van Wyk
France	Guy d'Arcangues, Marius Bardana, Yves Caillol, Jean Pierre Cros, Patrick Cros, J.L. Dupont, Jean-Pierre Hirigoyen, Henri de Lamaze, Gaëtan Mourgue D'Algue
Italy	Eduardo Bergamo, Nadi Berruti, Franco Bevione, G. Cavalcani, Angelo Croce, E. Remigi, Alberto Schiaffino
Netherlands	John F. Dudok van Heel, Robbie E. van Erven-Darens, Ajef F. Knappert, K. Knappert, Jani A.R. Roland Holst, W.F. Smit, O. van Zinnieq-Bergmann
Spain	Juan Antonio Andreu, Duke of Fernan-Nunez, Iván Maura, S.A.R. Don Ataulfo de Orléans, L. Rezola, Eduardo de la Riva
Sweden	Johny Anderson, Gustaf Adolf Bielke, Ola Bergqvist, Gunnar Carlander, Lennart Leinborn, Magnus Lindberg, Bengt Möller
Switzerland	Olivier Barras, G.Jaques-Dalcroze, Pierre Ducrey, M. Hodler, Philippe Huguenin, R. Moos, Ruedi Müller
West Germany	Walter Brühne, Hans Lampert, G. Möller, Jean Philipps, Helge Rademacher, Erik Sellschopp, Henning Sostmann

== Winners ==
Defending champion team Sweden won the gold medal, earning 5 points in flight A. Team England, on their first appearance in the championship, took the silver medal on 4 points and France earned, just as in the inaugural edition two years before, the bronze on third place.

On the last day of the tournament, Sweden and England met in the deciding match, where a tie was enough to give Sweden the championship. In the game between Bengt Möller, Sweden, and Keith Warren, England, Möller made a 14-meter putt on the 18th green, to tie the hole, win his game by one hole and secure a tie of the team match and the championship for Sweden, despite another two ongoing games.

Individual winner in the opening 36-hole stroke-play qualifying competition was Gaëtan Mourgue D'Algue, France, with a score of 3-under-par 143. Gustaf Adolf Bielke, Sweden, shot a new amateur course record in the second round, with a score of 5-under-par 68 over 18 holes at the Belgique course.

Team Sweden

== Results ==
Qualification rounds

Team standings

Place	Country	Score	To par
1	England	292-298=590	+6
2	Sweden	299-292=591	+7
3	France	301-297=598	+14
4	Italy	303-297=600	+16
5	West Germany	306-299=605	+21
6	Belgium	307-306=613	+29
7	Spain	311-307=618	+34
8	Netherlands	318-313=631	+47
9	Switzerland	323-313=636	+52
10	Austria	324-323=647	+63

Individual leaders

Place	Player	Country	Score	To par
1	Gaëtan Mourgue D'Algue	France	72-71=143	−3
T2	Franco Bevione	Italy	75-70=145	−1
T2	Gustav Adolf Bielke	Sweden	77-68=145	−1
T2	Gunnar Carlander	Sweden	71-74=145	−1
5	David Moffat	England	70-76=146	E

Note: There was no official recognition for the lowest individual score.

Flight A

Team matches

2	Sweden	France	0
5		4	

2	England	Italy	0
6.5		2.5	

2	Sweden	Italy	0
7		2	

1	England	France	1
4.5		4.5	

1	Sweden	England	1
4.5		4.5	

2	France	Italy	0
5		4	

Team standings

Country	Place	W	T	L	Game points	Points
Sweden	1	2	1	0	16.5–10.5	5
England	2	1	2	0	15.5–11.5	4
France	3	1	1	1	13.5–13.5	3
Italy	4	0	0	3	8.5–18.5	0

Flight B

Team matches

2	West Germany	Spain	0
4.5		4.5	

2	Belgium	Spain	0
5		4	

1	West Germany	Belgium	1
5.5		3.5	

Team standings

Country	Place	W	T	L	Game points	Points
West Germany	5	1	1	0	10–8	3
Belgium	6	1	0	1	8.5–9.5	2
Spain	7	0	1	1	8.5–9.5	1

Flight C

Team matches

2	Netherlands	Austria	0
6		3	

2	Switzerland	Austria	0
6		3	

1	Netherlands	Switzerland	1
6		3	

Team standings

Country	Place
Netherlands	8
Switzerland	9
Austria	10

Final standings

Place	Country
1st place, gold medalist(s)	Sweden
2nd place, silver medalist(s)	England
3rd place, bronze medalist(s)	France
4	Italy
5	West Germany
6	Belgium
7	Spain
8	Netherlands
9	Switzerland
10	Austria

== See also ==
- Eisenhower Trophy – biennial world amateur team golf championship for men organized by the International Golf Federation.
- European Ladies' Team Championship – European amateur team golf championship for women organised by the European Golf Association.
