= Alexandra Vilatte =

French golfer (born 1983)

Personal information
- Full name: Alexandra Vilatte Farret
- Nationality: France
- Born: 13 September 1983 (age 43) Paris, France
- Height: 168 cm (5 ft 6 in)

Career
- Sport: Golf
- Turned professional: 2012; Reinstated amateur c. 2022
- Former tour: Ladies European Tour (2012–2016)

Achievements and awards
- European Amateur Golfer of the Year: 2005
Medal record
Mediterranean Games
Silver medal – second place	2001 Tunis	Women's team

Alexandra Vilatte Farret (born 18 January 1983) is a French golfer who played on the Ladies European Tour 2012–2016 and was runner-up at the 2013 Honma Pilsen Golf Masters. She was the 2005 European Amateur Golfer of the Year and won the 2024 European Mid-Amateur Ladies' Championship.

== Amateur career ==
Vilatte was born in Paris. She is attached to RCF La Boulie and started playing golf aged 7. She was runner-up in the 2005 French International Ladies Amateur Championship, behind compatriot Anne-Lise Caudal.

Vilatte played at the 2002 Espirito Santo Trophy in Kuala Lumpur alongside Mahault Passerat de Silans and Gwladys Nocera. She appeared four times for France in the European Ladies' Team Championship alongside contemporaries such as Sophie Giquel, Anne-Lise Caudal, Cassandra Kirkland, Jade Schaeffer, Caroline Afonso and Valentine Derrey, earning a bronze medal in 2003 after beating Wales 4 1/2–2 1/2.

Vilatte made the cut in the Open de France Dames several times as an amateur, and finished tied 5th at the 2003 Biarritz Ladies Classic.

== Professional career ==
Vilatte turned professional in January 2012, after having finished training as a pharmacist. She joined the Ladies European Tour, where she played for five seasons until 2016. She was runner-up at the 2013 Honma Pilsen Golf Masters in the Czech Republic, where she finished a stroke behind winner Ann-Kathrin Lindner after scoring a final round 63.

In 2014, she finished 3rd at the Xiamen International Ladies Open in China. In 2016, her final season, she finished 38th in the season rankings.

== Reinstated amateur ==
Vilatte started competing as an amateur again in 2022, after being reinstated. She enjoyed success winning several tournaments in France and the 2023 edition of The Farrell in Connecticut, and won the 2024 European Mid-Amateur Ladies' Championship held in Latvia, a tournament where she finished 3rd in 2025.

In 2026, she made it to the round of 32 in the U.S. Women's Mid-Amateur at Montclair Golf Club.

== Amateur wins ==
- 2022 Championnat de Ligue, Grand Prix de Saint Germain
- 2023 The Farrell
- 2024 Championnat de Ligue, European Mid-Amateur Ladies' Championship

== Team appearances ==
Amateur

- European Girls' Team Championship (representing France): 1999, 2000
- Espirito Santo Trophy (representing France): 2002
- European Ladies' Team Championship (representing France): 2003, 2005, 2007, 2011
- Vagliano Trophy (representing the Continent of Europe): 2005
