= Golf de Chantilly =

Golf course in France

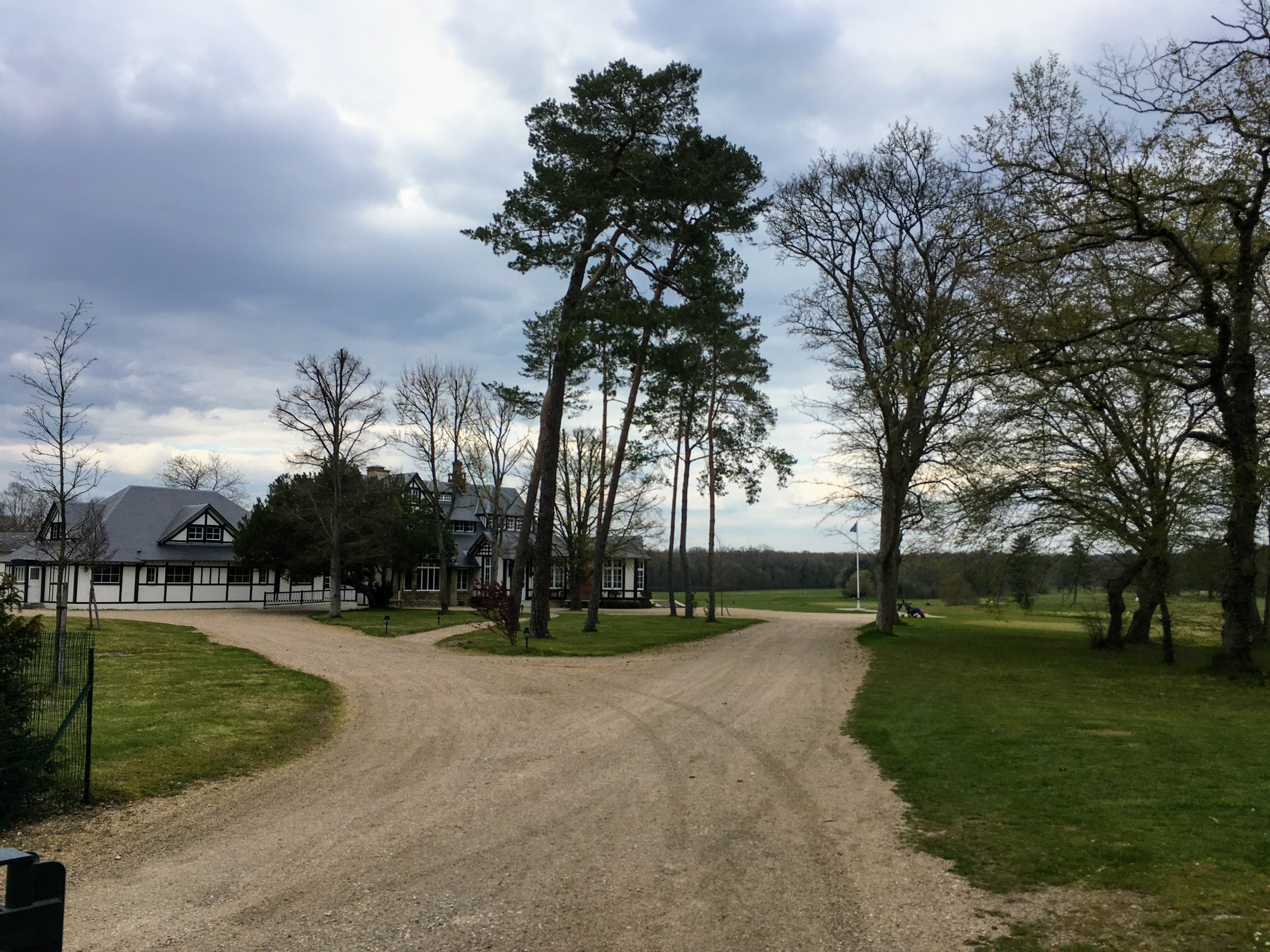

- Location in France
- 49.2061°N 2.4794°E

Club information
- Location: Vineuil-Saint-Firmin, Oise, France
- Established: 1909, 117 years ago
- Type: Private
- Tota holes: 36
- Tournaments: Open de France
- Website: golfdechantilly.com

Vineuil
- Designed by: Tom Simpson (1920)
- Par: 71
- Length: 6,399 metres (6,998 yd)

Longères
- Designed by: Donald Steel (1980s)
- Par: 73
- Length: 6,391 metres (6,989 yd)

Golf de Chantilly is a 36-hole golf complex situated 45 km north of Paris in the town of Vineuil-Saint-Firmin, department of Oise, France.

== History ==
The club, opened in 1909, sits just over a kilometer from the Château de Chantilly in the middle of a green forest, Forêt De Chantilly. It features two 18-hole courses, the Vineuil course and the Longères course. Tom Simpson extended the original 9-hole Vineuil course to 18 in 1920 when he also built a second course, the Longères. It suffered badly in WWII and was abandoned after the war, until Donald Steel used 5 of the old holes combined with 13 new ones he designed to re-open it in the 1980s.

== Tournaments ==
Chantilly has hosted a wide array of national and international championships since it opened in 1909.

It has hosted the Open de France, the oldest national open in continental Europe, eleven times between 1913 and 1990.

=== Professional ===
Year	Tour	Tournament	Winner
1913		8th Open de France	(Scotland) George Duncan
1925		15th Open de France	(France) Arnaud Massy
1933		23rd Open de France	(England) Bert Gadd
1937		27th Open de France	(France) Marcel Dallemagne
1947		31st Open de France	(England) Henry Cotton
1950		34th Open de France	(Argentina) Roberto De Vicenzo
1964		48th Open de France	(Argentina) Roberto De Vicenzo
1974	EUR	58th Open de France	(England) Peter Oosterhuis
1986	LET	Hennessy Cognac Ladies Cup	(United States) Kelly Leadbetter
1988	EUR	72nd Open de France	(England) Nick Faldo
1989	EUR	73rd Open de France	(England) Nick Faldo
1990	EUR	74th Open de France	(Republic of Ireland) Philip Walton

=== Amateur ===
- Vagliano Trophy – 1934 · 1953 · 1969 · 2005 · 2013
- French International Ladies Amateur Championship – 1963
- EGA Trophy – 1976
- European Amateur Team Championship – 1983 · 2016
- European Boys' Team Championship – 1987 · 2019
- St Andrews Trophy – 1994
- European Mid-Amateur Men's Championship – 1996
- Jacques Léglise Trophy – 2001
- European Senior Ladies' Championship – 2005
- European Senior Men's Championship – 2005
- European Young Masters – 2008
- European Amateur – 2009
- Junior Vagliano Trophy – 2013
