= European Mid-Amateur Men's Championship =

The European Mid-Amateur Men's Championship is a European amateur golf championship opened to men aged 25 or plus years old, organized by the European Golf Association.

The championship was introduced in 1991, with over 30 editions contested so far. The event is played annually in conjunction with the European Mid-Amateur Ladies' Championship. The age limit lowered from 30 to 25 years old in 2021.

== Format ==
The top 90 amateur players, aged from 25 years old, compete in a format consisting of three rounds of stroke play, with a cut after the second round out of which the lowest 54 men's scores can qualify for the final round.

== Past results ==
Year	Venue, Location	Winner	Runner-up	Third place
2024	Jurmala Golf Club & Hotel, Latvia	(Austria) Markus Habeler, 208	(Austria) Christopher Dlaska, 216	(Finland) Jussi Sahravuo, 217 (Switzerland) Dario Gabriel, 217
2023	Bogogno Golf Resort, Italy	(Germany) Michael Thannhaeuser, 208	(England) Ben Welch, 210	(Switzerland) Steven Rojas, 211 (Germany) Marian Luwig, 211
2022	Golf du Médoc Resort, France	(France) Joe Armstrong, 206	(Germany) Miko Apfel, 210	(Sweden) Jonas Wallmo, 210
2021	Pula Golf Resort, Spain	(Switzerland) Steven Rojas, 218	(Finland) Joonas Hinkkanen, 219	(Germany) Stefan Wiedergrün, 219
2020	Golf du Domaine Impérial, Switzerland	(Switzerland) Rodrigo Lacerda Soares, 207	(Germany) Stephan Gross, 211	(Australia) Richard Heath, 212
2019	St Laurence Golf, Finland	(Australia) Richard Heath, 203	(Germany) Nicolas Schmieding, 211	(France) Christophe de Grancey, 211
2018	Blacksearama Golf Resort, Bulgaria	(Spain) Carlos de Corral, 211	(Germany) Michael Thannhäuser, 211	(Denmark) Steffen Alvang, 212
2017	Real Club de la Puerta de Hierro, Spain	(Spain) Carlos de Corral, 219	(Sweden) Erik Persson, 222	(Australia) Richard Heath, 222
2016	Golf Resort Karlovy Vary, Czech Republic	(Germany) Marc Mazur, 141	(Germany) Claudio Consul, 142	(Sweden) Henrik Henningsson, 143
2015	GC Hubbelrath, Germany	(Australia) Richard Heath, 215	(France) Nicolas Singer, 217	(Spain) Eduardo Corsini, 218
2014	Pravets GC, Bulgaria	(Germany) Alexander Koller, 210	(Germany) Felix Banzhaf, 210	(Australia) Richard Heath, 210
2013	Penati Golf Resort, Slovakia	(France) Bertrand Noël, 220	(Australia) Richard Heath, 220	(Germany) Albert Türklitz, 220
2012	Estonian G&CC, Estonia	(Denmark) Morten Findsen Schou, 221	(Germany) Alexander Koller, 222	(Finland) Timo Tuunanen, 222
2011	Sola GC, Norway	(Finland) Marco Willberg, 221	(Spain) Jacobo Cestino, 222	(Sweden) Niklas Rosenkvist, 223 (Denmark) Morten Findsen Schou, 223 (Finland) Jani Michelsson, 223
2010	Morfontaine, France	(France) François Illouz, 210	(Spain) Jacobo Cestino, 210	(England) Mark Wharton, 210
2009	Rio Real (Marbella), Spain	(England) Stephen East, 217	(England) Nigel Sweet, 218	(Brazil) Rodrigo Lacerda Soares, 219
2008	Postołowo GC, Poland	(Denmark) Michael Flindt, 218	(Sweden) Niklas Rosenkvsit, 221	(England) Roger Roper, 224
2007	Golf Club Domaine Impérial, Switzerland	(England) Gary Wolstenholme, 213	(Finland) Mika Wikström, 222	(Germany) Ulrich Schulte, 222
2006	Golf Club Grand Ducal, Luxembourg	(England) Gary Wolstenholme, 210	(Denmark) Jakob Thomsen, 210	(England) Roger Roper, 213
2005	Royal Bled Golf Club, Slovenia	(Spain) José María Zamora, 216	(England) Graham Ruth, 220	(France) François Illouz, 220
2004	Varese Golf Club, Italy	(Italy) Filippo Clerici, 210	(Italy) Rodolfo Pesati, 213	(France) François Illouz, 215
2003	Mosjö Golf Club, Sweden	(Germany) Hans-Günter Reiter, 216	(England) Roger Roper, 218	(France) François Illouz, 219
2002	Kärtner Golf Club Dellach, Austria	(Germany) Hans-Günter Reiter, 210	(Republic of Ireland) Karl Bornemann, 215	(Germany) Christian Sommer, 215
2001	Gloria Golf Club, Turkey	(England) Barry Downing, 216	(France) François Illouz, 217	(Sweden) Thomas Nilsson, 218
2000	Notts Golf Club, England	(France) François Illouz, 221	(England) Robert Sallis, 222	(England) Gary Wolstenholme, 222
1999	Golf Club Grand-Ducal, Luxembourg	(Germany) Hans-Günter Reiter, 215	(Sweden) John Lindberg, 216	(England) Martin Galway, 220
1998	Roma Golf Club, Italy	(Spain) Víctor Fernández, 215	(Spain) Miguel Preysler, 218	(Sweden) Per Anders Winge, 218
1997	Karlovy Vary Golf Club, Czech Republic	(Switzerland) Markus Frank, 211	(England) Charles Banks, 217	(Italy) Marcello Grabau, 223
1996	Golf de Chantilly, France	(Switzerland) Markus Frank, 214	(France) François Illouz, 215	(England) John Paramor, 217
1995	Estoril Golf Club, Portugal	(England) John Marks, 219	(England) Ian Glantz, 219	(England) Barry Downing, 220
1994	El Saler Golf Club, Spain	(England) Lane McKenzie, 221	(Germany) Veit Pagel, 222	(Spain) Luis Gabarda, 222
1993	Royal Waterloo Golf Club, Belgium	(Sweden) Hans Ivarsson, 220	(France) François Natali, 221	(Germany) Veit Pagel, 221
1992	Venice Golf Club, Italy	(Spain) Luis Gabarda, 216	(Switzerland) Carlos Rampone, 217	(Germany) Veit Pagel, 220
1991	Ascona Golf Club, Switzerland	(France) Alexis Godillot, 216	(Switzerland) Pierre-Alain Rey, 217	(Spain) Luis Javier Trenor, 218

== Multiple winners ==
- 3 wins: Hans-Günter Reiter
- 2 wins: Carlos de Corral, Markus Frank, Richard Heath, François Illouz, Gary Wolstenholme

== See also ==
- European Mid-Amateur Ladies' Championship – corresponding EGA event for women
- U.S. Mid-Amateur Golf Championship – corresponding USGA event
