= French International Ladies Amateur Championship =

Tournament information
- Location: France
- Organised by: Fédération française de golf
- Format: 54-hole stroke play
- Month played: October

Current champion
- (Hong Kong) Sabrina Wong (2026)

The French International Ladies Amateur Championship, known since 1998 also as the Cécile de Rothschild Trophy, is an annual amateur golf tournament in France for women.

This stroke play championship, contested over 54 holes, was first held in 1962, making it the oldest such international ladies amateur championship in Europe. The British equivalent, the British Ladies Amateur Stroke Play Championship, was created several years later.

Initially it attracted little international interest and the title was contested mainly between French players. Brigitte Varangot, Catherine Lacoste and Odile Garaïalde dominated the event in the early years. By the 1990s the championship was attracting an international field and in 1992 the Spaniard Estefania Knuth won the title, followed in second place by her compatriot Laura Navarro.

Between 1994 and 2002 the tournament was contested every other year, alternating with the International de France Match Play, which was discontinued in 2001. Since 1998, due to a donation from Nathaniel de Rothschild, the winner is presented with the Cécile de Rothschild Trophy in her memory. The trophy is always kept at Morfontaine Golf Club.

== Winners ==
Year	Venue	Champion	Score	Runner(s)-up	Ref
Trophée Cécile de Rothschild
2026	Morfontaine	(Hong Kong) Sabrina Wong	206	(Spain) Icíar Rodríguez	
2025	Lyon	(Germany) Lily Reitter	208	(France) Pauline Stein	
2024	Morfontaine	(France) Mila Tamisier	207	(France) Sophie Renner (Germany) Giselle Zhao	
2023	Chiberta	(France) Carlotta Locatelli	199	(France) Sara Brentcheneff	
2022	Roissy	(Italy) Paris Appendino	209	(Denmark) Cecilie Finne-Ipsen	
2021	Chiberta	(Switzerland) Elena Moosmann	201	(France) Maylis Lamoure	
2020	Omaha Beach	(France) Charlotte Liautier	212^{PO}	(France) Ariane Klotz	
2019	Bondues	(Italy) Virginia Elena Carta	209	(Russia) Nataliya Guseva	
2018	Granville	(Belgium) Clarisse Louis	286	(England) Mimi Rhodes (Netherlands) Anouk Sohier	
2017	Morfontaine	(Denmark) Puk Lyng Thomsen	274	(Italy) Alessia Nobilio	
2016	Belle Dune	(Italy) Alessia Nobilio	283^{PO}	(Sweden) Beatrice Wallin	
2015	Morfontaine	(Finland) Anna Backman	281^{PO}	(France) Inès Lescudier	
2014	Saint-Germain	(France) Anyssia Herbaut	280	(Switzerland) Gioia Carpinelli	
2013	Morfontaine	(France) Mathilda Cappeliez	281^{PO}	(Denmark) Nanna Koerstz Madsen	
2012	Saint-Germain	(Germany) Franziska Friedrich	213	(England) Alexandra Peters	
2011	Morfontaine	(France) Perrine Delacour	212	(France) Fiona Puyo	
2010	Palmola	(Spain) Noemí Jiménez	273	(France) Béatrice Soubiron	
2009	Fontainebleau	(France) Justine Dreher	289	(Germany) Ann-Kathrin Lindner	
2008	Morfontaine	(Spain) Carlota Ciganda	285	(France) Barbara Genuini (France) Lucie André	
2007	Ésery	(France) Morgane Bazin de Jessey	294	(France) Emilie Alonso (Switzerland) Caroline Rominger	
2006	Morfontaine	(France) Isabelle Boineau	285^{PO}	(France) Anne-Lise Caudal	
2005	Pau	(France) Anne-Lise Caudal	282	(France) Alexandra Vilatte	
2004	Morfontaine	(Germany) Pia Odefey		(Netherlands) Dewi Claire Schreefel	
2003	Le Lys	(France) Anne-Sophie Le Nalio	272	(France) Fanny Schaeffer	
2002	Morfontaine	(France) Gwladys Nocera	284	(France) Elena Giraud	
2001	No tournament				
2000	Morfontaine	(Spain) Carmen Alonso	288	(Spain) Tania Elósegui	
1999	No tournament				
1998	Morfontaine	(France) Stéphanie Arricau	286	(Netherlands) Marieke Zelsmann	
International de France Medal Play
1997	No tournament				
1996	Médoc	(Sweden) Anna Berg	277	(Netherlands) Marcella Neggers	
1995	No tournament				
1994	Le Golf National	(France) Amandine Vincent	284	(Italy) Alessandra Salvi	
1993	Apremont	(Spain) Macarena Campomanes	294	(Spain) Sara Beautell	
1992	Paris International	(Spain) Estefania Knuth	279	(Spain) Laura Navarro	
1991	Saint-Nom	(France) Cécilia Mourgue d'Algue	290	(France) Valérie Michaud	
1990	Morfontaine	(France) Kristel Mourgue d'Algue	288	(France) Carole Marty	
1989	Saint-Cloud	(Canada) Deborah Lee Eldridge	293	(Belgium) Aline Van der Haegen	
1988	Saint-Nom	(France) Cécilia Mourgue d'Algue	297	(France) Caroline Bourtayre	
1987	Le Lys	(France) Sophie Louapre	292	(France) Carole Marty	
1986	Saint-Germain	(France) Cécilia Mourgue d'Algue	300	(France) Corinne Soulès	
1985	La Boulie	(France) Karine Espinasse	289	(France) Sophie Louapre	
1984	Fontainebleau	(France) Catherine Lacoste	302	(France) Virginie Labesse Burrus	
1983	Le Lys	(France) Corinne Soulès	288	(France) Éliane Berthet	
1982	Saint-Cloud	(France) Cécilia Mourgue d'Algue	294	(France) Marie-Laure de Lorenzi	
1981	Saint-Nom	(France) Éliane Berthet		(France) Sophie Lapaire	
1980	Morfontaine	(France) Marie-Laure de Lorenzi	295	(France) Cécilia Mourgue d'Algue	
1979	La Boulie	(France) Marie-Christine Ubald-Bocquet	301	(France) Cécilia Mourgue d'Algue	
1978	Morfontaine	(France) Nathalie Jeanson	283	(France) Catherine Lacoste	
1977	No tournament				
1976		(France) Marie-Christine Ubald-Bocquet	296	(Switzerland) Carole Charbonnier	
1975	Saint Germain	(France) Catherine Lacoste	293	(France) Anne Marie Palli	
1974	Saint Cloud	(France) Martine Giraud	289	(France) Odile Garaïalde	
1973	Morfontaine	(France) Odile Garaïalde	305	(France) Brigitte Varangot (France) Anne Marie Palli	
1972	Saint Nom	(France) Brigitte Varangot	311	(France) Odile Garaïalde	
1971	No tournament				
1970	Saint Cloud	(France) Brigitte Varangot	299	(France) Martine Giraud	
1969	Saint Cloud	(France) Odile Garaïalde	302	(France) Martine Giraud	
1968	Saint Germain	(France) Odile Garaïalde	293	(France) Catherine Lacoste	
1967	Saint Cloud	(France) Catherine Lacoste	300	(France) Brigitte Varangot	
Trophée Carven
1966	Saint Cloud	(France) Catherine Lacoste	293	(France) Claudine Cros	
1965	Saint Cloud	(France) Catherine Lacoste	291	(France) Claudine Cros	
1964	Saint Cloud	(France) Brigitte Varangot	304	(France) Catherine Lacoste	
1963	Chantilly	(France) Brigitte Varangot	315	(France) Claudine Cros	
1962	Morfontaine	(France) Claudine Cros	298	(France) Brigitte Varangot	
