= Pierre Menet =

Pierre Menet is French businessman and chairman emeritus of the French Lancôme Company.

He is credited, along with Gaëtan Mourgue D'Algue and Dominque Motte, with bringing the Canada Cup golf tournament to Saint-Nom-la-Bretèche in 1963, helping popularize the then little known sport of golf in France. The tournament was renamed in 1970 "Trophée Lancôme", in honor of Menet's company, and brought even more prominence to the Golf de Saint Nom by attracting players such as Arnold Palmer, Gary Player and Seve Ballesteros to compete in the event.
