= Jean-Claude Richard =

French painter

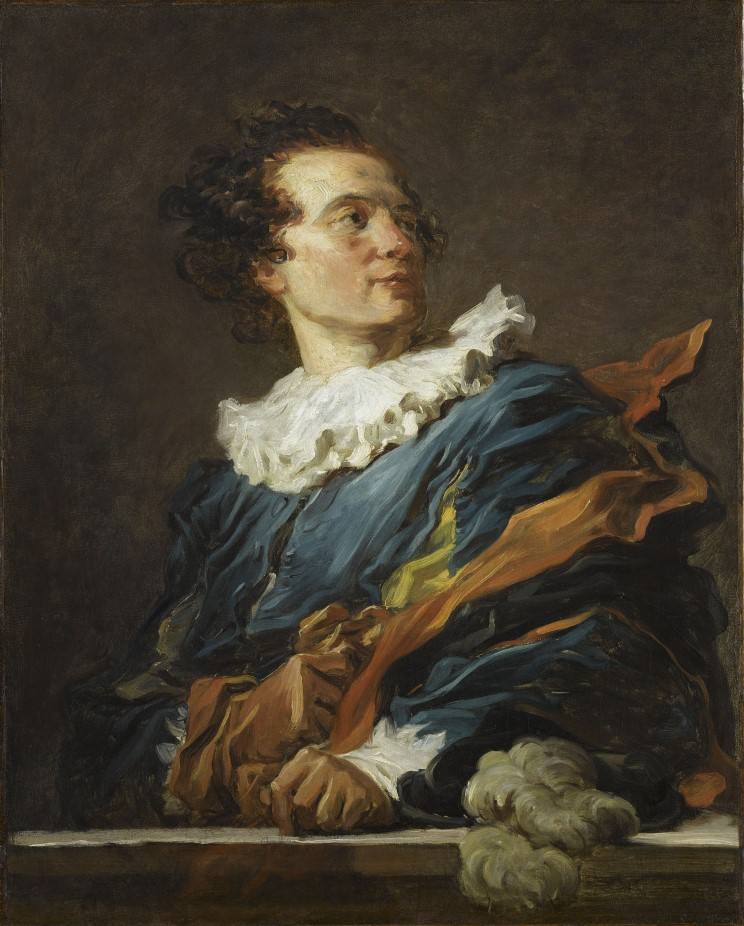
Jean-Claude Richard – The Abbé de Saint Non at the Louvre (artist: Jean-Honoré Fragonard ).

Jean-Claude Richard de Saint-Non (1727 – 25 November 1791) was a French painter and printmaker. He was born, and also died, in Paris. He is often rather misleadingly known as the "Abbé de Saint-Non"; although intended for the church by his family, he never took more than minor orders. He was a pioneer of the aquatint technique in printmaking.

== Family background and history ==
View of the gardens of the Villa Mattei, print by Jean-Claude Richard from a painting by Hubert Robert, 1761

His family estate, from which he derives his full title, is the Château de Saint-Nom. It is located in the village of Saint-Nom-la-Bretèche in Yvelines, France. The land was purchased by his father, Jean-Pierre Richard (died 1747), a wealthy French lord.

== Relationships with contemporary artists ==
Richard, who had an interest in printmaking, travelled to Rome in 1759, where he met and befriended French artists Jean-Honoré Fragonard and Hubert Robert, both of whom were studying at the French Academy in Rome. In 1760 he took a trip with Herbert Robert to see the tourist attractions of Naples, Herculaneum, Paestum, Pozzuoli and environs. He paid expenses in exchange for Robert's original drawings.

Richard made numerous prints of both Fragonard's and Robert's work, including Robert's Vue prise dans les jardins de Villa Mattei aux environs de Rome (View of the Gardens at the Villa Mattei) in 1761.

Fragonard later painted a portrait of Richard (see picture above), which is in the Louvre.

== See also ==
- French art
