= 1986 Espirito Santo Trophy =

Tournament information
- Dates: 14–17 October
- Location: Caracas, Venezuela; 10.423°N 66.810°W
- Course: Lagunita Country Club
- Organized by: World Amateur Golf Council
- Format: 72 holes stroke play

Statistics
- Par: 72
- Length: 6,007 yards (5,493 m)
- Field: 27 teams 81 players

Champion
- Spain; Macarena Campomanes, Mari Carmen Navarro, Maria Orueta
- 580 (+4)
- Location in Venezuela

The 1986 Espirito Santo Trophy took place 14–17 October at Lagunita Country Club in Caracas, Venezuela. It was the 12th women's golf World Amateur Team Championship for the Espirito Santo Trophy. The tournament was a 72-hole stroke play team event with 27 team entries, each with three players. The best two scores for each round counted towards the team total.

The Spain team won the trophy, earning the title for the first time, beating team France by three strokes. France earned the silver medal while the United States team took the bronze at third place one more stroke back.

== Teams ==
27 teams entered the event and completed the competition. Each team had three players.

Country	Players
Argentina	Maria Marta Abramoff, Maria Eugenia Noguerol, Nora Ventureira
Australia	Louise Briers, Edwina Kennedy, Sandra McCaw
Austria	Alexandra Kotschwar, Daniela Rauch, Ike Wieser
Belgium	Isabelle De Clercq, Aline Van Der Haegen, Agathe Verlegh
Bermuda	Judithanne Astwood-Outerbridge, Diana Diel, Janice Trott
Brazil	Maria Alicia Gonzales, Elisabeth Nickhorn, Cristina Schmitt
Canada	Gail Anderson, Judy Medlicott, Marilyn Palmer O'Connor
China	Yeh Wei-fing, Li Wen-lin, Chen Yueh-shuang
Colombia	Susie Faccini, Adriana Gomez, Claudia Penuela
Costa Rica	Silvia P. Perez, Sylvia Siemon, Hilda Steinvorth
Denmark	Anette Peitersen, Merete Meiland, Annika Östberg
Dominican Republic	Carmen Corrie, Silvia Dowling, Pamela Gagnon
France	Marie-Laure de Lorenzi-Taya, Cécilia Mourgue d'Algue, Valérie Golléty-Pamard
(United Kingdom) Great Britain & Ireland	Claire Hourihane Dowling, Trish Johnson, Jill Thornhill
Hong Kong	Elidh Cameron, Nan Coockewit, Marianne Gerber
Italy	Stefania Croce, Emanuelo Braito Minetti, Stefania Scarpa
Japan	Hiromi Kobayashi, Aiko Hashimoto, Michiko Hattori
Mexico	Carolina Fernandez, Ana Luisa Hernandez, Adriana Ramirez
New Zealand	Karrien Duckworth, Marnie McGuire, Brenda Ormsby
Peru	Marisa Alzamora, Alicia Dibos, Maria Julia Raffo
Spain	Macarena Campomanes, Mari Carmen Navarro, Maria Orueta
Sweden	Helen Alfredsson, Eva Dahllöf, Sofia Grönberg-Whitmore
Switzerland	Régine Lautens, Evelyn Orley, Jackie Orley
United States	Kay Cockerill, Kathleen McCarthy, Leslie Shannon
Venezuela	Yubiri Cortez, Maria Eugenia Larrazabal, Chela Quintana
West Germany	Susanne Knödler, Martina Koch, Stephanie Lampert
Zimbabwe	E. Midgley, Karen Ryan, Linda M. Turnbull

== Results ==
Place	Country	Score	To par
1st place, gold medalist(s)	Spain	148-146-139-147=580	+4
2nd place, silver medalist(s)	France	148-142-145-148=583	+7
3rd place, bronze medalist(s)	United States	151-145-144-144=584	+8
4	(United Kingdom) Great Britain & Ireland	143-148-146-148=585	+9
5	Japan	148-145-145-148=586	+10
6	Venezuela	151-149-150-149=599	+23
7	Sweden	152-149-147-152=600	+24
8	Switzerland	148-157-152-146=603	+27
9	West Germany	152-160-149-147=608	+32
T10	Australia	147-157-154-152=610	+34
T10	China	153-152-151-154=610	+34
12	Denmark	153-156-152-150=611	+35
13	Peru	150-156-148-159=613	+37
14	New Zealand	164-153-150-150=617	+41
T15	Brazil	159-150-154-160=623	+47
T15	Italy	153-155-161-154=623	+47
17	Belgium	162-151-153-158=624	+48
18	Canada	158-159-157-155=629	+53
19	Mexico	167-153-158-152=630	+54
T20	Argentina	157-159-161-159=636	+60
T20	Colombia	154-163-152-167=636	+60
22	Austria	173-160-155-157=645	+69
23	Hong Kong	169-167-160-162=658	+82
24	Bermuda	165-171-168-165=669	+93
25	Costa Rica	166-167-175-173=681	+105
26	Dominican Republic	164-185-172-162=682	+106
27	Zimbabwe	167-175-171-178=691	+115

== Individual leaders ==
There was no official recognition for the lowest individual scores.

Place	Player	Country	Score	To par
1	Marie-Laure de Lorenzi-Taya	France	72-72-72-68=284	−4
2	Michiko Hattori	Japan	75-70-71-72=288	E
T3	Trish Johnson	(United Kingdom) Great Britain & Ireland	72-73-74-72=291	+3
T3	Régine Lautens	Switzerland	72-77-73-69=291	+3
5	Macarena Campomanes	Spain	76-74-70-72=292	+4
6	Kay Cockerill	United States	81-70-72-70=293	+5
7	Leslie Shannon	United States	74-75-72-74=295	+7
T8	Alicia Dibos	Peru	72-74-74-76=296	+8
T8	Jill Thornhill	(United Kingdom) Great Britain & Ireland	71-77-72-76=296	+8
10	Chela Quintana	Venezuela	77-72-74-74=297	+9
