= European Mid-Amateur Ladies' Championship =

The European Mid-Amateur Ladies' Championship is a European amateur golf championship, opened to women aged 25 or plus years old, organized by the European Golf Association.

The championship was introduced in 2019 and is now played annually in conjunction with the European Mid-Amateur Men's Championship. The age limit lowered from 30 to 25 years old in 2021.

== Format ==
The top 54 amateur players, aged from 25 years old, compete in a format consisting of three rounds of stroke play, with a cut after the second round out of which the lowest 33 scores and ties qualify for the final round.

== Past results ==
Year	Venue, Location	Winner	Runner-up	Third place
2025	Quinta do Peru GC, Portugal	(Republic of Ireland) Jessica Ross, 221	(Republic of Ireland) Aideen Walsh, 221	(France) Alexandra Farret, 223
2024	Jurmala Golf Club & Hotel, Latvia	(France) Alexandra Farret, 216	(France) Pauline Stein, 217	(Spain) Ane Urchegui, 219 (Republic of Ireland) Aideen Walsh, 219
2023	Bogogno Golf Resort, Italy	(Germany) Alena Oppenheimer, 214	(Republic of Ireland) Jessica Ross, 214 (Belgium) Celine Manche, 214	—N/a
2022	Golf du Médoc Resort, France	(Spain) Ane Urchegui, 209	(France) Charlotte Guilleux, 209	(Germany) Julia Neumann, 212
2021	Pula Golf Resort, Spain	(Germany) Maria Anetseder, 229	(Germany) Deborah Wehle, 229	(Belgium) Céline Manche, 232
2020	Golf du Domaine Impérial, Switzerland	(Netherlands) Myrte Eikenaar, 227	(Germany) Nina Birken, 227	(France) Hélène Malvy, 227
2019	St Laurence Golf, Finland	(Netherlands) Myrte Eikenaar, 222	(Germany) Nina Birken, 224	(France) Amandine Vincent, 226

== Multiple winners ==
- 2 wins: Myrte Eikenaar

== See also ==
- European Mid-Amateur Men's Championship – corresponding EGA event for men
- U.S. Women's Mid-Amateur – corresponding USGA event
