= Forêt de Marly =

Coordinates: 48°52′N 2°02′E

The Forêt de Marly (known as the forêt de Cruye until the 18th century) is a 2000 ha forest estate in Yvelines, between Saint-Germain-en-Laye and Versailles, about 15 km west of Paris. It is about 12 km long east to west, over the communes of Louveciennes, Marly-le-Roi, Saint-Nom-la-Bretèche, Feucherolles and others. Historically, it was a hunting estate of the kings of France, then of the presidents of the Republic, but since 1935, it is divided along its whole length by the A13 autoroute.

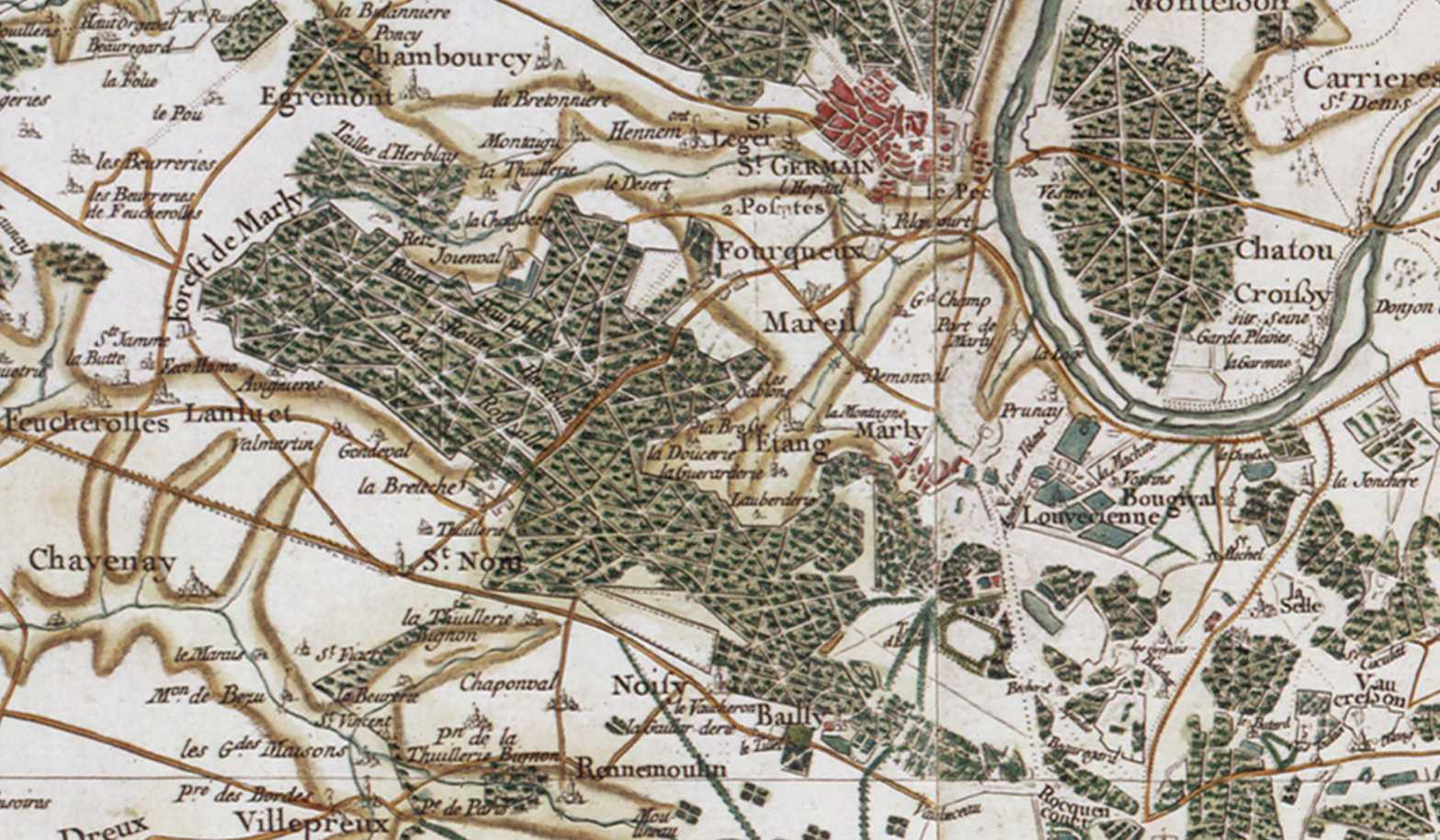
Forêt de Marly - Cassini

== See also ==
- Désert de Retz
- National Forest (France)
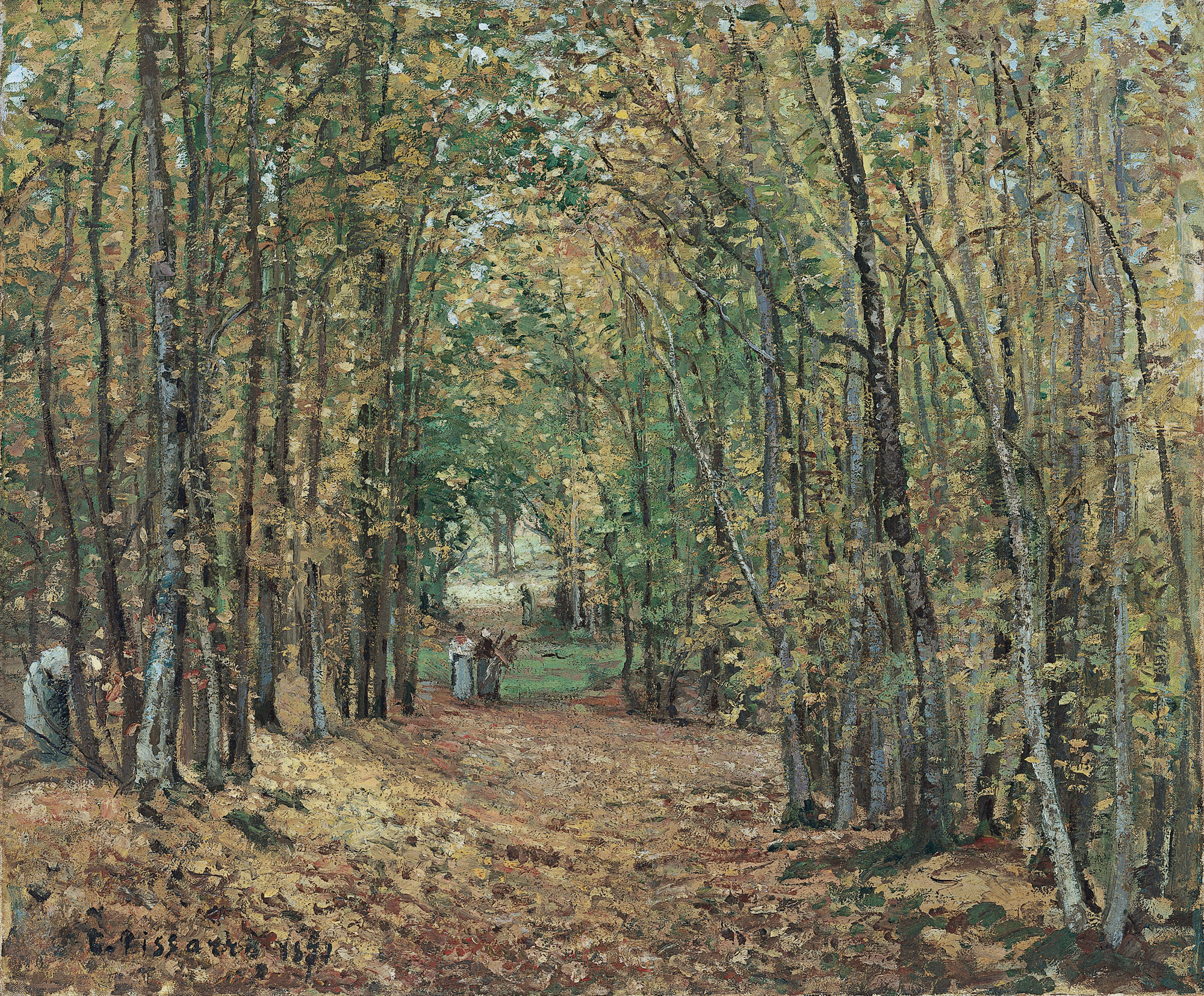
Bois de Marly, 1871, Camille Pissarro. Colección Thyssen Bornemisza.
