= Saint-Nom-la-Bretèche =

- Commune
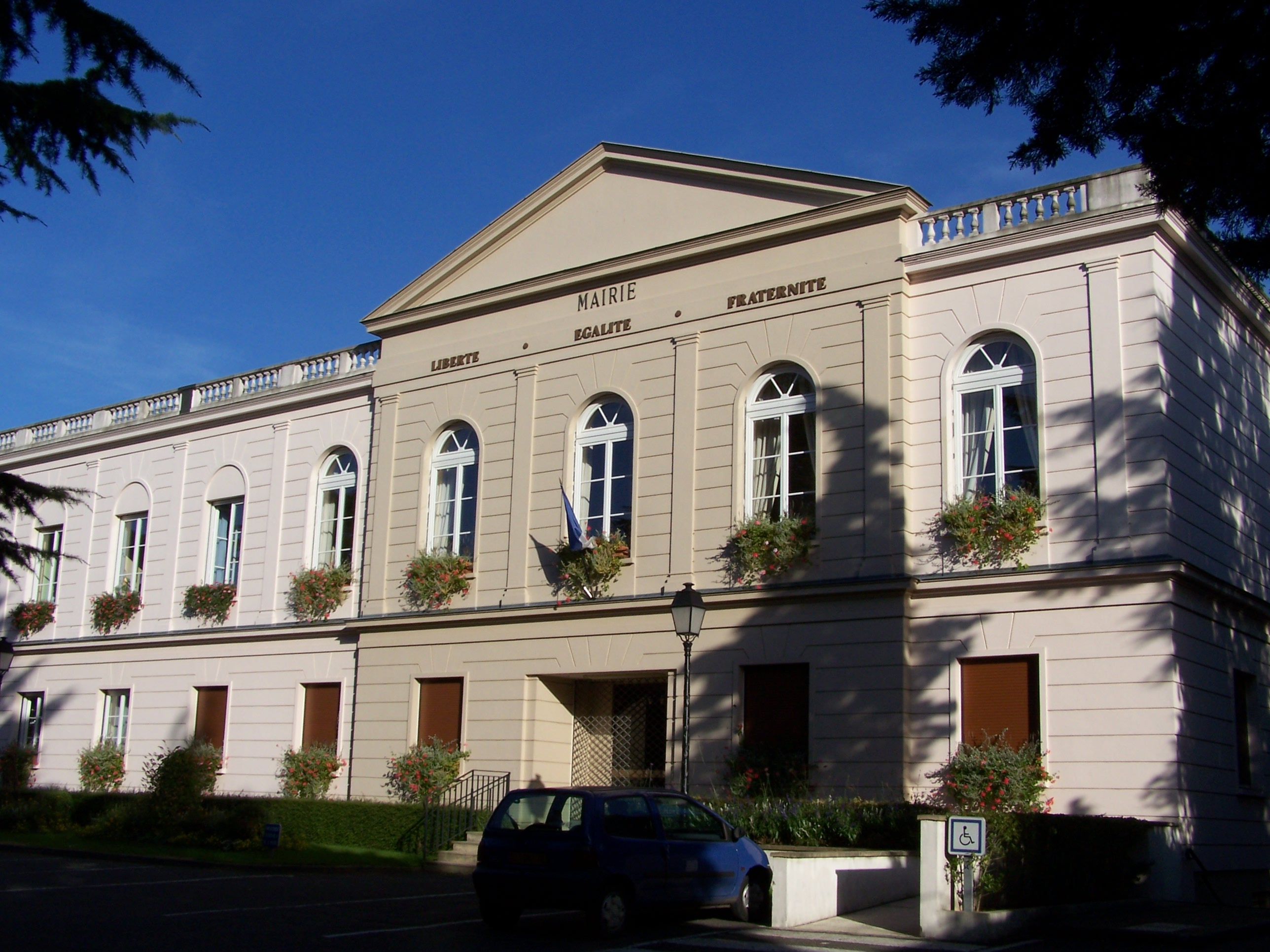
- Town hall

- Coat of arms
- Location of Saint-Nom-la-Bretèche
- Location within France Location within Île-de-France (region)
- Coordinates: 48°51′38″N 2°01′20″E
- Country: France
- Region: Île-de-France
- Department: Yvelines
- Arrondissement: Saint-Germain-en-Laye
- Canton: Verneuil-sur-Seine
- Intercommunality: CC Gally Mauldre

Government
  - Mayor (2020–2026): Gilles Studnia
- Area^{1}: 48.27 km^{2} (18.64 sq mi)
- Elevation: 144.5 m (474 ft)
- Highest elevation: 187.5 m (615 ft)
- Lowest elevation: 112.8 m (370 ft)
- Population (2023): 4,965
  - Density: 102.9/km^{2} (266.4/sq mi)
- Demonym: Nonnais-Bretêchois
- Time zone: UTC+01:00 (CET)
  - Summer (DST): UTC+02:00 (CEST)
- INSEE/Postal code: 78571 /78860
- ^{1} French Land Register data, which excludes lakes, ponds, glaciers > 1 km^{2} (0.386 sq mi or 247 acres) and river estuaries.

Saint-Nom-la-Bretèche (French pronunciation: [sɛ̃ nɔ̃ la bʁətɛʃ]) is a commune in the Yvelines department in the Île-de-France region in north-central France.

== History ==
Saint-Nom-la-Bretèche was built around 4 core hamlets near the Forest of Marly. The village takes its name from a 9th-century co-bishop, saint Nonne, who re-evangelized the country after the Norman invasions, and from La Bretesche, a wooden stronghold (from breit eiche: big oak tree) consisting of a hamlet at the edge of the forest of Cruye, now the forest of Marly.

The hamlet was originally called "Saint-Nonne au Val de Galie", the name of the parish, then "Saint-Nom près de la Bretesche" and since the Revolution, "Saint-Nom-la-Bretèche".

During the French Revolution the district was called "La Montagne Fromentale" and then "l'Union la Bretesche".

The hamlets of Avinières, Val-Martin, La Tuilerie-Bignon were the responsibility of numerous lords, as well as of the Dames de Poissy and the Vaux-de-Cernay Abbey.

The north of the village, La Bretèche, was part of Marly Park, while the south, Saint-Nom, was part of Versailles Park, making it difficult for the village as a whole to acquire an identity well into the 20th century.

Steady demographic growth, which accelerated significantly after 1982, eventually unified the two villages and allowed the building of a "Centre Village" and a Library by 2000.

Some historic structures in the village suffered irreparable damage from a freak storm with tornado strength winds that struck France in December 1999. The storm, which also damaged nearby Versailles, uprooted centuries-old trees and part of the wall of the Château de la Bretèche along the Route de Sainte Gemme.

== Population ==
Historical population
Year	Pop.	±% p.a.
1968	1,087	—
1975	2,997	+15.59%
1982	3,567	+2.52%
1990	5,071	+4.50%
1999	4,966	−0.23%
2007	4,949	−0.04%
2012	5,101	+0.61%
2017	4,911	−0.76%
2023	4,965	+0.18%
Source: INSEE

== Transport ==
The Saint-Nom-la-Bretèche–Forêt de Marly station is served by Transilien commuter trains and Île-de-France tramway Line 13 Express.

== Golf course ==
Saint Nom is known internationally for its golf course in the Tuilerie area.

=== History ===
In 1954, Mr. Ortet, owner of the "Ferme de le Tuilerie", asked a real estate agent, Daniel Feau, to find a potential buyer for his property. Feau wanted to build a large golf course in the Paris area.

On May 2, 1957, Mr. Entem, mayor of the village, officially revealed the project of a golf course to the town council.

1959 saw the opening of a 36-hole golf course.

=== Origin of the Trophée Lancôme ===
Saint-Nom resident Gaëtan Mourgue D'Algue wanted to popularize the then little-known sport of Golf in France. With Dominique Motte, he suggested the creation of a new "champion-trophy" to Pierre Menet, the chairman of the Lancôme Company, whose goal would be to bring together eight of the best players in the world.

The Canada Cup, took place in Saint-Nom-La-Bretèche in 1963, which enhanced the village's international reputation.

The first 54-hole competition took place in 1970 and was won by Tony Jacklin.

Renamed "Trophée Lancôme" it was played by Arnold Palmer, Gary Player and Seve Ballesteros.

== Sights ==
=== Ferme de Saint-Nom ===
The Ferme de Saint-Nom, given by a lord of Poissy to the Vaux de Cernay monastery in 1228, and profited from numerous donations. By incrementally and regularly gaining plots of land, the cistercian monks turned the agricultural estate into what was then considered to be a model farm, setting well distributed buildings around a farmyard. Sold as public property during the French Revolution, the farm was greatly modified during the 17th and 18th centuries. In the 20th century, lodgings were established on the property; the only remaining memento of the original farm was the inscription of its name, written over the porchway.

=== Chateau of la Bretèche ===
Now private property, formerly fief of the Pomereu family for over two centuries. It was sold to King Louis XIV in 1700 for the Comte de Toulouse (legitimatized son of the King and Madame de Montespan) who housed his hunting equipment on the premises. The castle was subsequently purchased by numerous lords, one of whom was Jean-Pierre Richard, father of the famous painter and engraver Jean-Claude Richard, the "Abbé de Saint-Nom".

=== Ferme de Valmartin ===
The Ferme de Valmartin belonged to a seigniory until 1600, when it was sold to the nuns of the Royal convent of the Dames de Poissy. It was transformed into a farm by the end of the 18th century, where it was used to breed merino sheep. The farm was sold as public property during the French Revolution.

=== Tuilerie-Bignon ===
Formerly part of Versailles Park, this land was later turned into Saint-Nom's prestigious golf course.

=== Church of Saint Nom ===
The church was originally a tithe barn belonging to the Ferme de St-Nom. A watchtower was erected to protect the church in the 12th century. The church has been expanded, partially destroyed and remodeled between the 12th and 20th centuries. It was restored in the late 20th century.

=== Forêt de Marly ===
The Forêt de Marly is an ancient oak forest formerly called the Forêt de Cruye. It covers one third of Saint-Nom.

=== Other notable historical structures ===
- Old Post office de Saint Nom, Rue de Valmartin
- Boulangerie de la Bretèche
- Maison du 2 Route de Sainte Gemme
- Maison "La Fleuriade" (subdivided in 1989 into the 'Clos du Pré du Val')
- Maison "de Lesseps"
- Maison "La Datcha" de Pierre Richard Willem (was later replaced by 'la Résidence du Parc')
- Maison "Kosciusko"

== Gallery ==
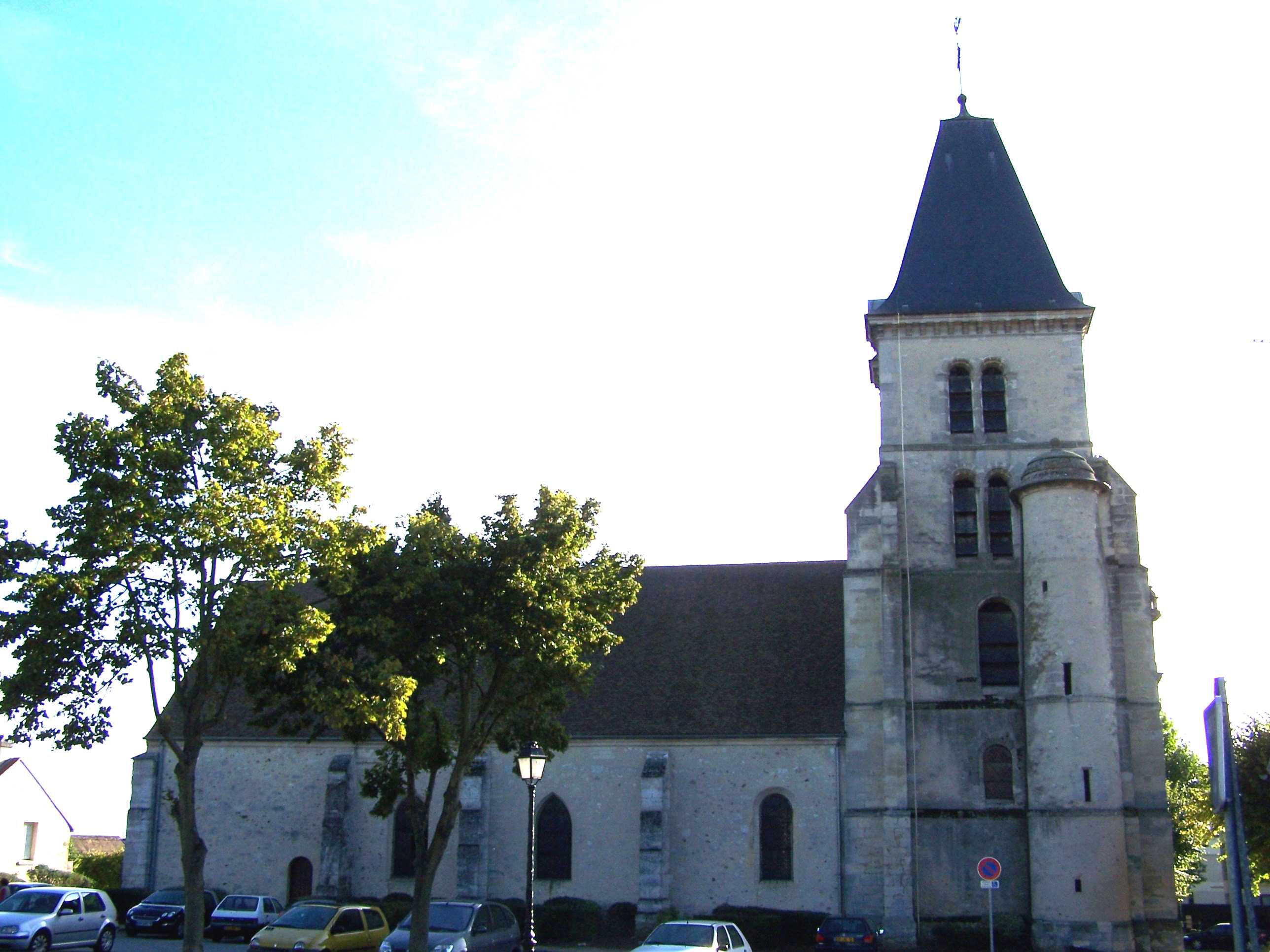

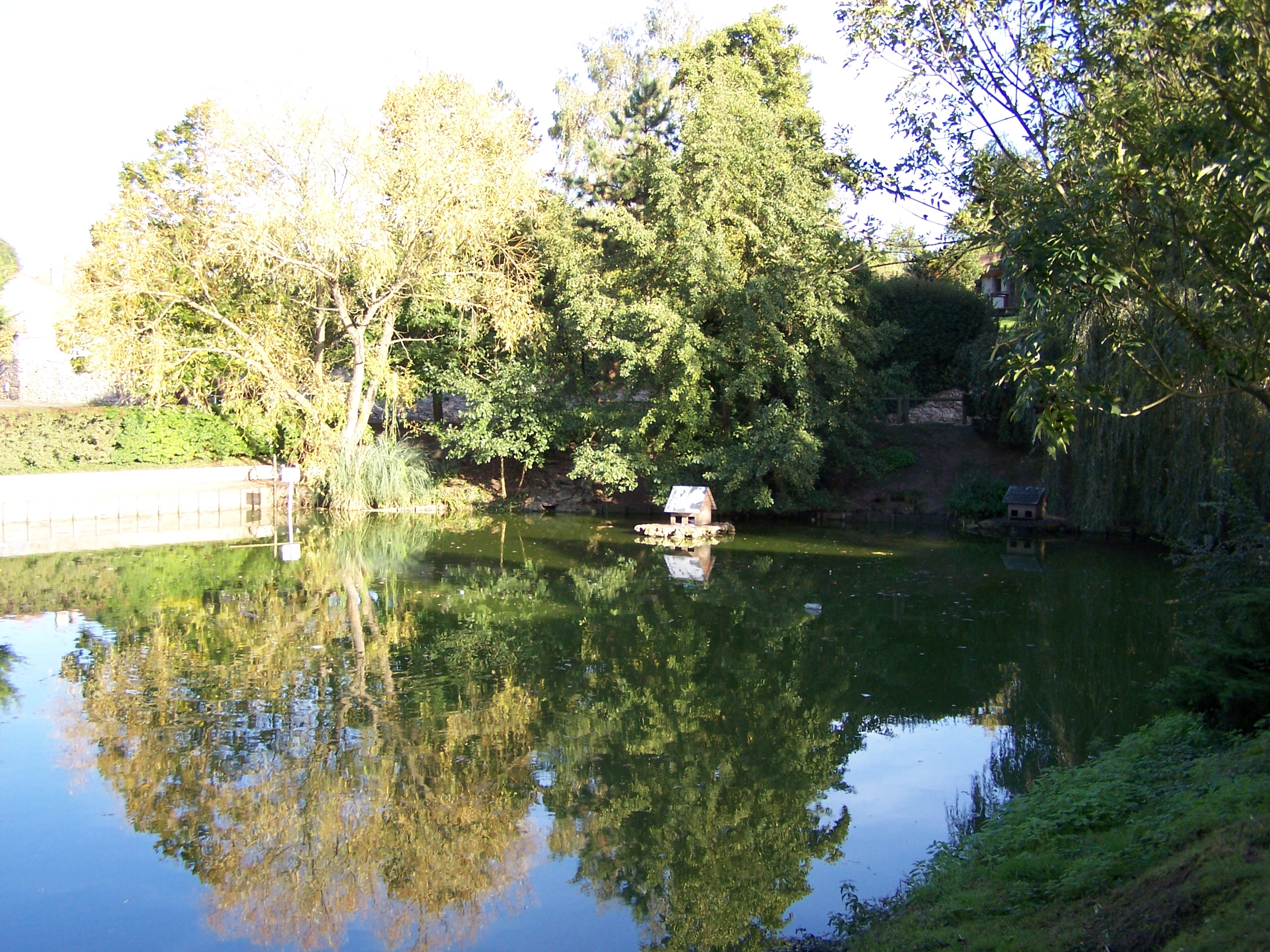

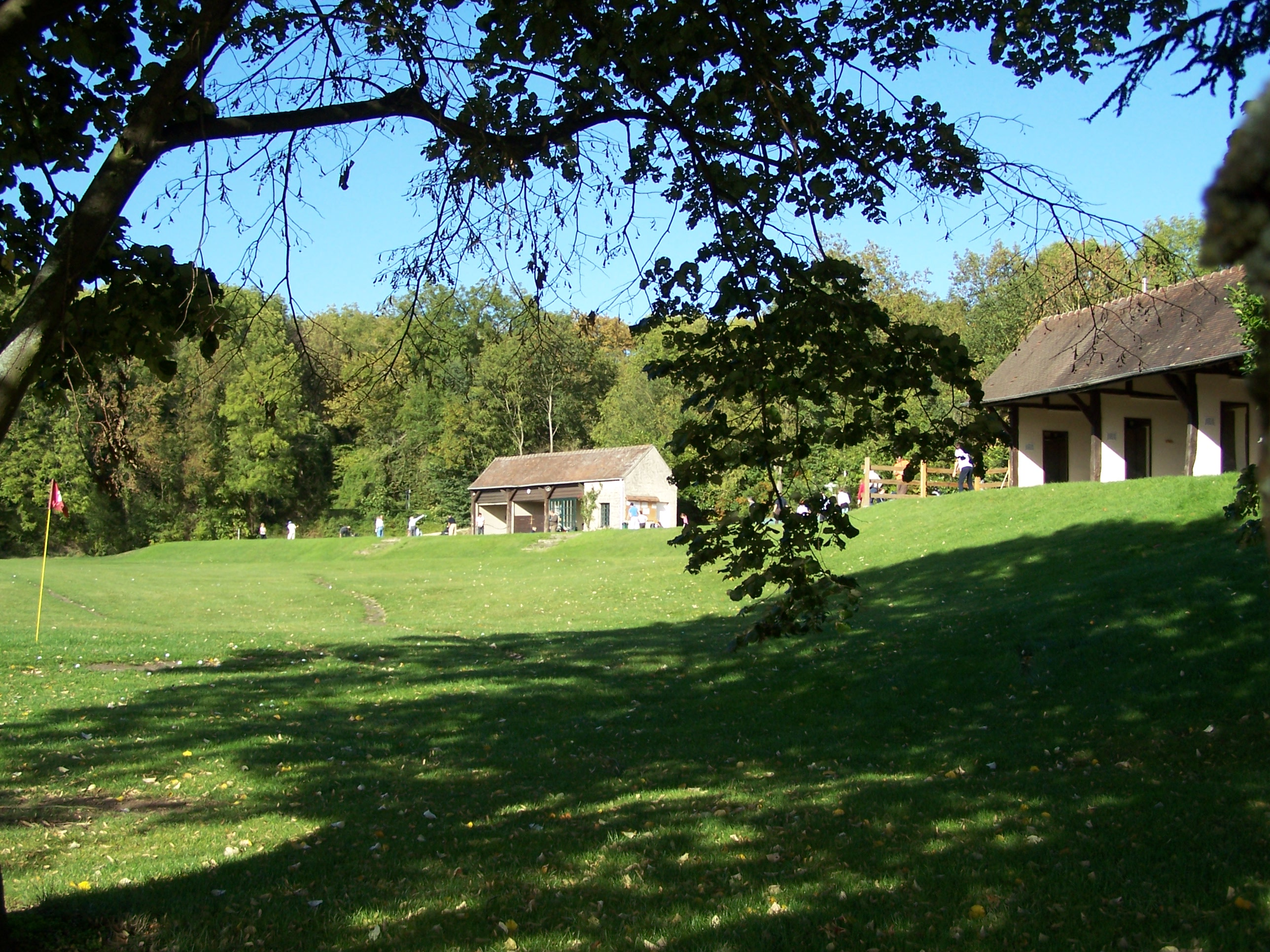

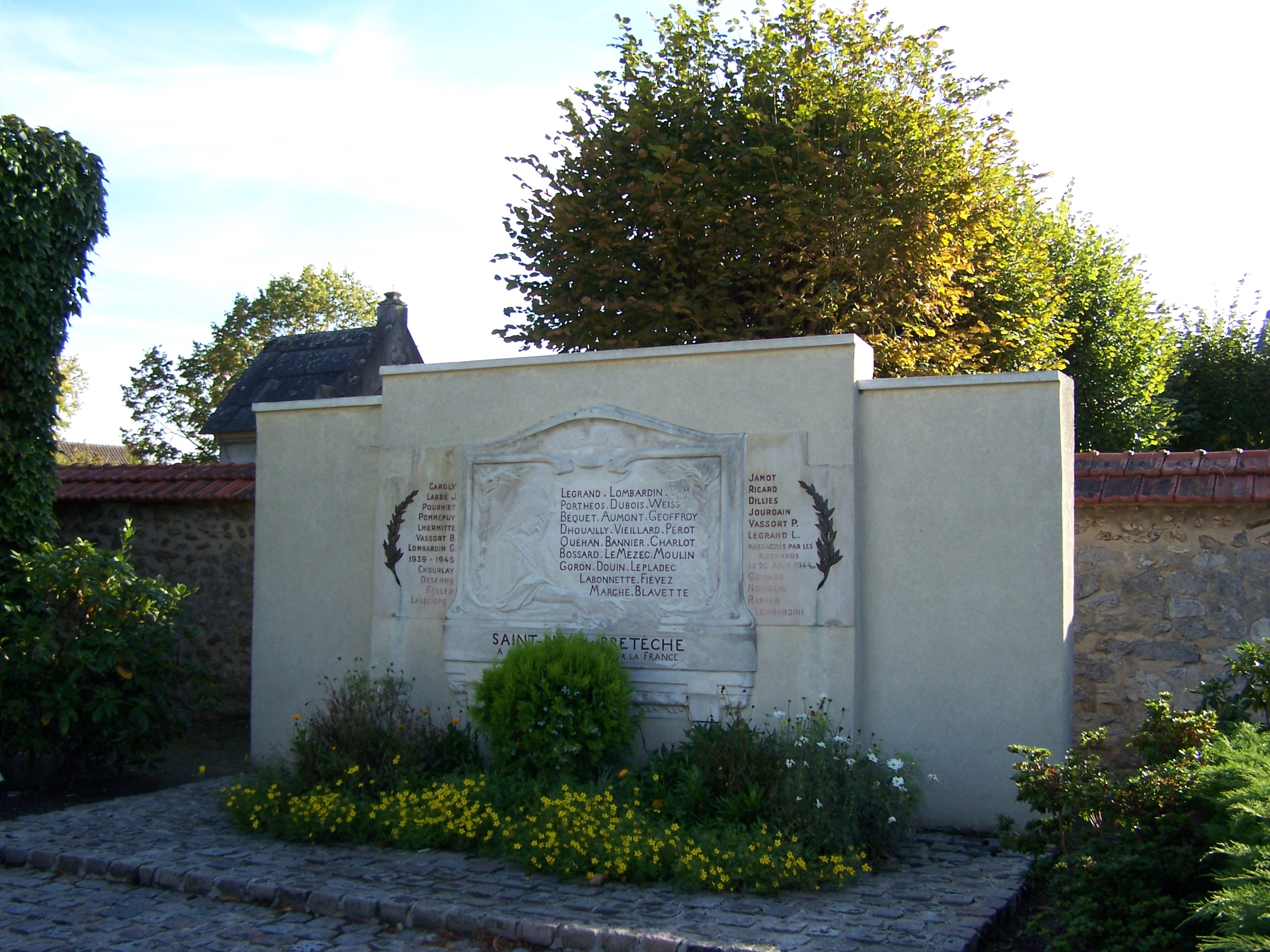

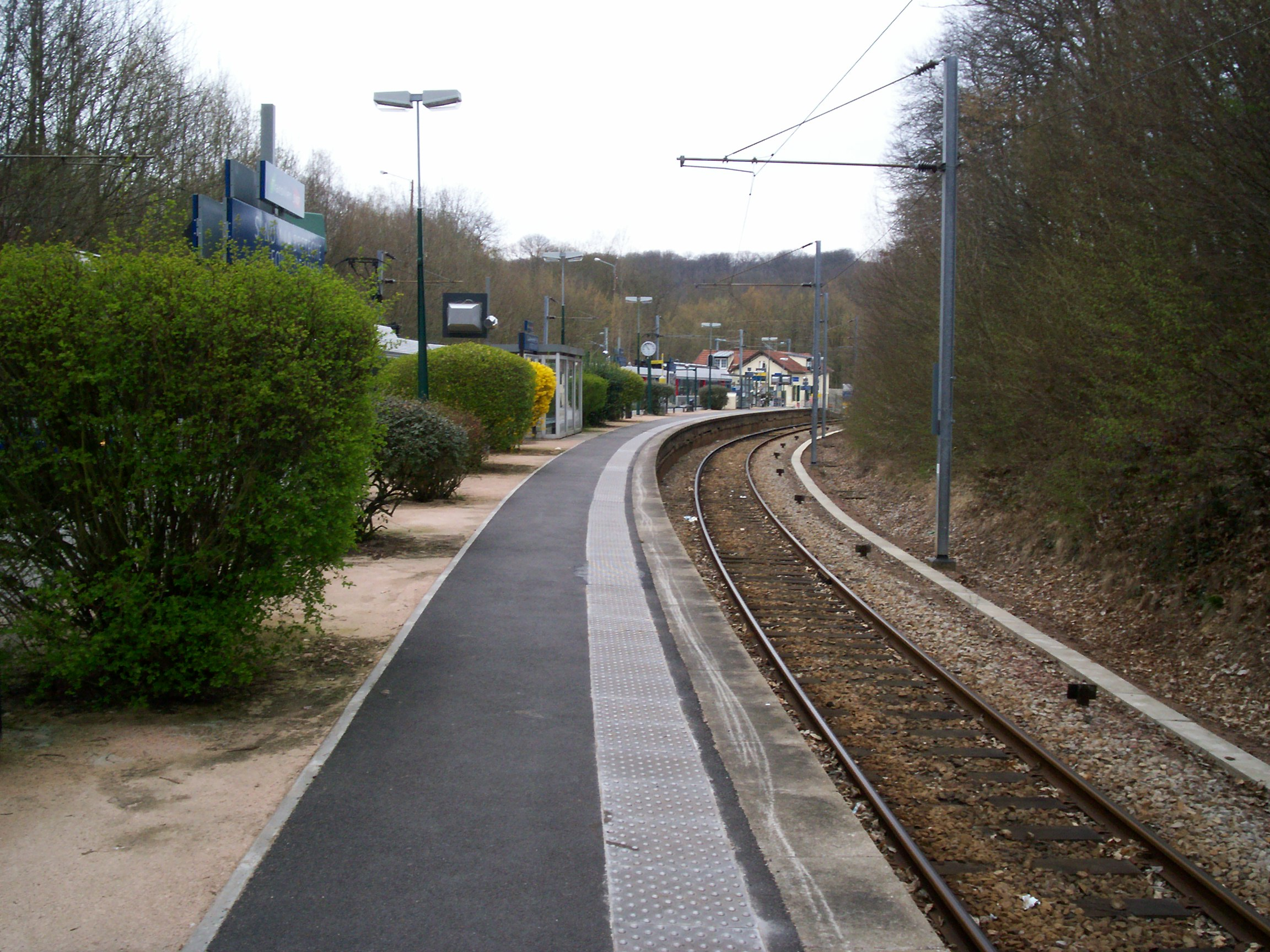

== Coat of arms ==
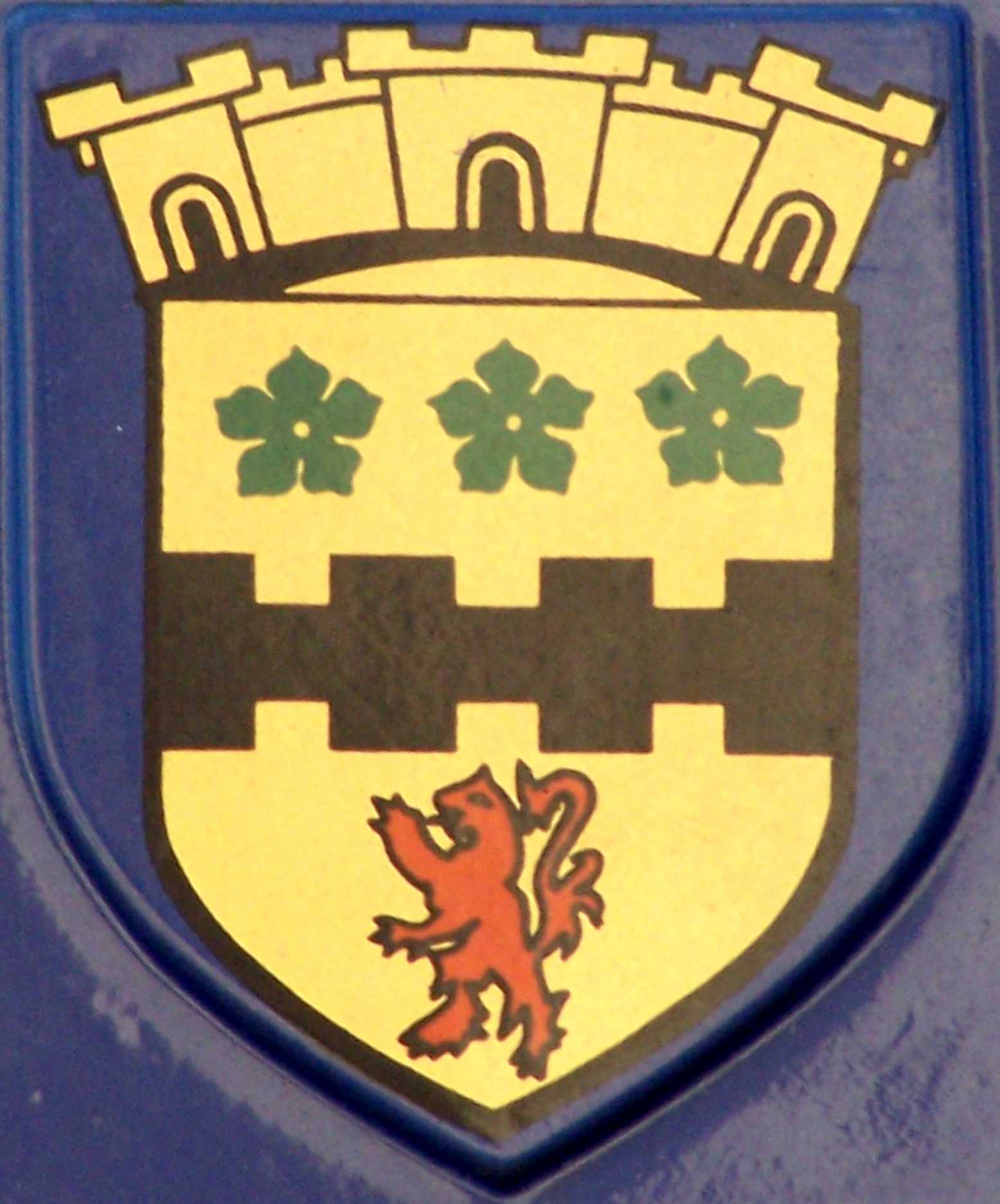
The coat of arms of Saint-Nom

The coat of arms of Saint-Nom shows in its center the "fasce bretessée" which evokes the etymology of Bretèche (from the Latin bretachiae): a fortification built at the entrance of a forest.

The three five-petalled leaves of the Potentilla reptans (quintefeuilles) symbolize the Forest of Marly-le-Roi, a large part of which belongs to Saint-Nom.

The fork-tailed lion comes from the seal of Amaury de Montfort, shown on historical charts dating back to 1226 and leased to the Monks of Saint-Nom.

The crown of the crest shows a three-towered wall, which was the symbol worn by Greek goddesses, guardians of the cities.

== Notable people ==
- Lyonnel de Bournonville, lord of La Bretèche in 1420 and died there in 1429.
- Michel Dureuil, painter who frequently spent time in the town, where his gallerist resided.
- Charles Letrosne, architect and writer, died in Saint-Nom-la-Bretèche in 1939.
- Yvon Le Roux, footballer who resided in the commune while he played for Paris Saint-Germain
- Blaise Matuidi, footballer who resided in the commune while he played for Paris Saint-Germain
- Gaëtan Mourgue d'Algue, golfer who resided in the commune.
- Pierre Richard-Willm, actor who owned a property in the commune.
- Pierre-Yves Trémois, sculptor, died in Saint-Nom-la-Bretèche in 2020.

== Twin towns ==
Saint-Nom-la-Bretèche is twinned with Valley Village, California.

Along with Chavenay, Crespières and Feucherolles, Saint-Nom is also twinned with Rösrath, Germany.

== See also ==
- Communes of the Yvelines department
