= Julie Greciet =

French professional golfer

Personal information
- Nationality: France
- Born: 27 November 1986 (age 39) Bayonne, France
- Height: 1.70 m (5 ft 7 in)

Career
- Sport: Golf
- Turned professional: 2007
- Former tour: Ladies European Tour (joined 2008)
- Professional wins: 1

Number of wins by tour
- Ladies European Tour: 1

Best results in LPGA major championships
- Chevron Championship: DNP
- Women's PGA C'ship: DNP
- U.S. Women's Open: DNP
- Women's British Open: DNP
- Evian Championship: CUT: 2014

Julie Greciet (born 27 November 1986) is a French professional golfer who played on the Ladies European Tour between 2008 and 2015. She won the 2014 Sberbank Golf Masters.

== Career ==
Greciet was successful at Q-School in her first attempt, and turned professional ahead of joining the Ladies European Tour in 2008.

In 2009, she shared the first round lead in the Ladies Irish Open with Maria Hjorth, finishing the tournament T10. She was runner-up at the 2011 Raiffeisenbank Prague Golf Masters, two strokes behind compatriot Jade Schaeffer. In 2012, she recorded three top-10 finishes including T3 at the 2012 China Suzhou Taihu Open, and finished 53rd in the ranking.

In 2014, Greciet won the Sberbank Golf Masters, two strokes ahead of Lee-Anne Pace from South Africa. She made her first appearance in a major championship at the 2014 Evian Championship, where she missed the cut by two strokes.

Greciet played with a wrist injury 2014, which caused her to withdraw from tour in 2015.

== Professional wins (1) ==
=== Ladies European Tour wins (1) ===
No.	Date	Tournament	Winning score	To par	Margin of victory	Runner-up	Ref
1	27 Jul 2014	Sberbank Golf Masters	66-64-66=196	−20	2 strokes	(South Africa) Lee-Anne Pace	
