= Ann-Kathrin Lindner =

German professional golfer

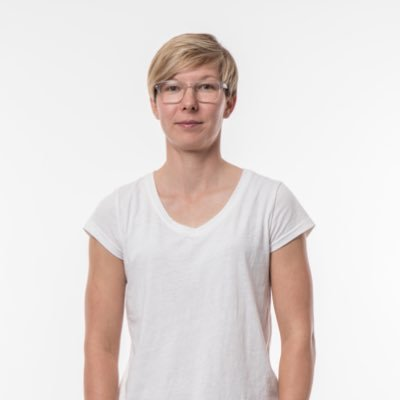
- Lindner in 2018

Personal information
- Nickname: Anka
- Nationality: Germany
- Born: 29 November 1987 (age 38) Hannover, Germany
- Height: 1.67 m (5 ft 6 in)

Career
- Sport: Golf
- Turned professional: 2013
- Former tour: Ladies European Tour (joined 2013)
- Professional wins: 1

Best results in LPGA major championships
- Chevron Championship: DNP
- Women's PGA C'ship: DNP
- U.S. Women's Open: DNP
- Women's British Open: DNP
- Evian Championship: CUT: 2013

Ann-Kathrin Lindner (born 29 November 1987) is a German professional golfer. She played on the Ladies European Tour and won the Honma Pilsen Golf Masters in 2013.

== Amateur career ==
Lindnder represented Golf Club St. Leon-Rot and was a member of the German National Team from 2010. In 2011 she was runner-up at the European Ladies Club Trophy in Crete, and again at the German National Championship. In 2012 she was runner-up at the German National Amateur behind Karolin Lampert.

== Professional career ==
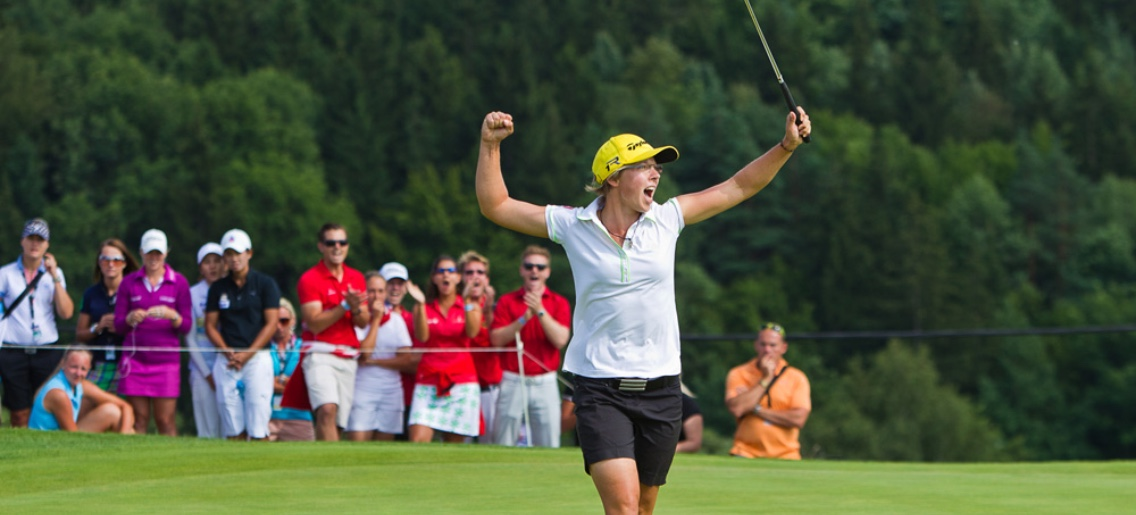
Lindner in 2026

Lindner turned pro after securing a tour card at the LET Qualifying School in December 2012. In her rookie season she was runner-up at the Dinard Ladies Open in the LET Access Series in April, and won her maiden LET title in August, the Honma Pilsen Golf Masters in Czech Republic.

In 2014 she enjoyed top-10 finishes at the Ladies Slovak Open (T5), Ladies Scottish Open (solo 10th) and South African Women's Open (T4). By 2017 she made only three LET cuts and retired from tour.

== Professional wins (1) ==
=== Ladies European Tour (1) ===
No.	Date	Tournament	Winning score	Margin of victory	Runner-up
1	8 Aug 2013	Honma Pilsen Golf Masters	−12 (66-67-68=201)	1 stroke	(Italy) Diana Luna (France) Alexandra Vilatte
