= European Golf Association =

Non profit organisation

- Formation: 20 November 1937; 88 years ago
- Type: Sports association (Association organized under the laws of the Swiss Confederation)
- Headquarters: Épalinges, Switzerland
- Members: 49 member federations
- General Secretary: (Germany) Michael Thannhäuser
- President: (Netherlands) Jan Hubrecht
- Past President: (Iceland) Haukur Örn Birgisson
- President-Elect: Caroline Huyskes
- Website: www.ega-golf.ch

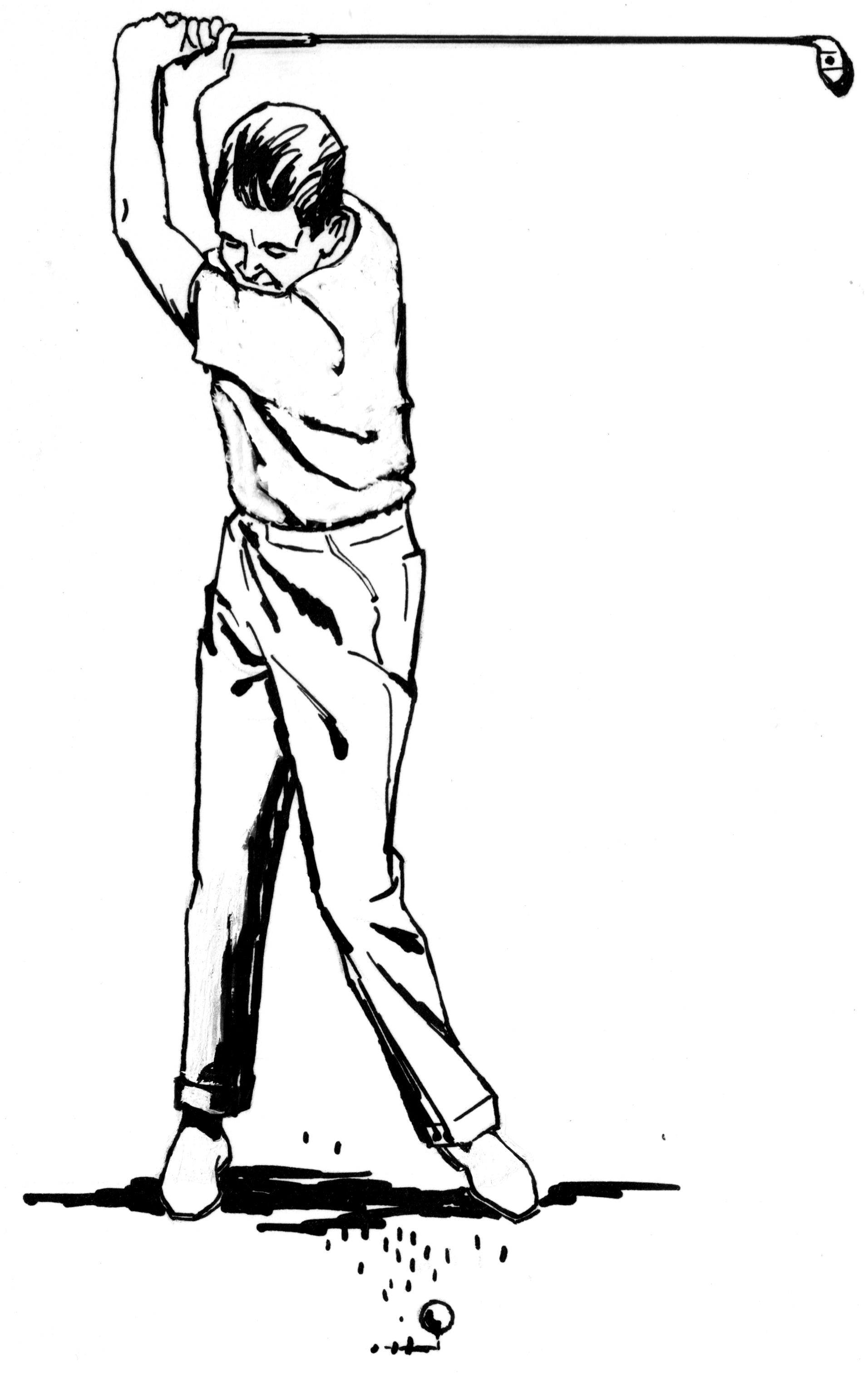
by Pearson Scott Foresman

The European Golf Association (EGA) is a non-profit organisation based in Épalinges, Switzerland, which was founded in 1937 in Luxembourg.

The EGA's main activity consists of coordinating and co-organizing European amateur golf championships. It functions in coordination with its 49 member federations. It also is the body responsible for the implementation of the World Handicap System in Europe.

In reaction to the 2022 Russian invasion of Ukraine, in March 2022 the European Golf Association announced that it would not allow teams, individuals, and officials from Russia and Belarus to participate in EGA events in 2022, and that no EGA events were planned to take place in Russia or Belarus.

== History and function ==
The European Golf Association was founded in Luxembourg on 20 November 1937.

The EGA is governed by three committees:

- Executive Committee
- Championship Committee
- Handicapping and Course Rating Committee

In addition to coordinating and co-organizing amateur golf tournaments and international matches, the EGA also reviews the European aspects of the Rules of Golf and the European amateur status as defined by The R&A Rules Limited, being concerned only by matters of an international character.

The association is the governing body responsible for the implementation of the World Handicap System in Europe; it is particularly responsible for reviewing and harmonizing the calculation of handicap European amateur players.

== Member federations ==
The EGA currently comprises 49 member federations. The EGA membership is reserved for national European golf associations, federations or unions, with only one representing the golf activities of its country. Each member federation operates independently in their respective country with regards to their domestic affairs over which the EGA has no jurisdiction.

Member federations are divided into four geographical areas.

EGA Members federations (49)
Great Britain and Ireland (GB&I) Zone	North Zone	Central Zone	South and Eastern Zone
England; Scotland; Wales; Ireland	Belarus; Denmark; Estonia; Finland; Iceland; Latvia; Lithuania; Norway; Poland; Russia; Sweden; Ukraine	Austria; Belgium; Bulgaria; Czech Republic; Germany; Hungary; Liechtenstein; Luxembourg; Moldova; Netherlands; North Macedonia; Romania; Slovakia; Switzerland	Andorra; Armenia; Azerbaijan; Bosnia and Herzegovina; Croatia; Cyprus; France; Georgia; Greece; Israel; Italy; Kazakhstan; Malta; Portugal; San Marino; Serbia; Slovenia; Spain; Turkey
Total = 4	Total = 12	Total = 14	Total = 19

== World Handicap System ==
The World Handicap System (WHS) is a new handicapping system implemented in 2020, which aims to unify the previous six different handicap systems in order to enable golfers to play and compete on a fair and equal basis, regardless of how and where they play. Until 2020, several different handicap systems were operating independently across different regions of the world, all of which were governed by separate bodies. Their different characteristics have sometimes resulted in inconsistency, as a player could have a different handicap depending which country he was registered in.

The WHS is governed by the World Handicap Authority, which features representatives of the six former handicapping bodies (the EGA, the United States Golf Association, the Council of National Golf Unions, Golf Australia, the South African Golf Association and the Argentina Golf Association), and is now jointly run by the United States Golf Association and The R&A.

The EGA is the governing body responsible for the implementation of the World Handicap System in Europe, except the members representing England, Ireland, Scotland and Wales, owing to their membership to the Council of National Golf Unions (CONGU). European golfers are affiliated to the national golf authority in charge in their jurisdiction.

The EGA member federations (excluding CONGU nations) are currently adopting and implementing the WHS in their respective countries. The implementation and oversight of handicapping continues to be the responsibility of each handicapping authority and National Association. Under one handicap system, a player’s handicap can be applicable on any course in the world. The WHS therefore facilitates international competition under one global system, granting players to compare their handicaps with and fairly compete against all registered golfers across the globe.

== EGA events ==
The EGA coordinates and co-organizes 27 European golf tournaments.

=== European Individual Championships (8) ===
- European Amateur Championship (1986–)
- European Ladies Amateur Championship (1986–)
- European Mid-Amateur Men's Championship (1991–)
- European Mid-Amateur Ladies' Championship (2019–)
- European Senior Men's Championship (1996–)
- European Senior Ladies' Championship (1996–)
- European Young Masters (1995–)
- European Championships for Disabled Golfers: The EGA collaborates with the European Disabled Golfers Association (EDGA) for the organisation of the event and awards medals to the winners of the championship.

=== European Team Championships (11) ===
- European Amateur Team Championship (1959–)
- European Amateur Team Championship, Division 2 (Formerly named EGA Men's Challenge Trophy from 2002 to 2013) (2002–)
- European Ladies' Team Championship (1959–)
- European Boys' Team Championship (1980–)
- European Boys' Team Championship, Division 2 (Formerly named EGA Boys' Challenge Trophy from 2004 to 2013) (2004–)
- European Girls' Team Championship (1991–)
- European Senior Men's Team Championship (2006–)
- European Senior Ladies' Team Championship (2006–)
- European Men's Team Shield (2015–)
- European Ladies' Team Shield (2016–)
- European Team Championships for Disabled Golfers: The EGA collaborates with the European Disabled Golfers Association (EDGA) for the organisation of the event and awards medals to the winners of the championship.

=== International Matches (6) ===
- Bonallack Trophy
- Patsy Hankins Trophy
- Vagliano Trophy
- Junior Vagliano Trophy
- St Andrews Trophy
- Jacques Léglise Trophy

=== Club Trophies (2) ===
- European Men's Club Trophy (1975–)
- European Ladies' Club Trophy (2001–)

=== Others ===
The EGA is involved is involved in the organisation of the following events:

- Junior Ryder Cup : The EGA collaborates with the European Tour regarding the Junior Ryder Cup European team selection.
- Asia-Pacific Junior Championship: The EGA sends the European Young Masters winners and runners-up of the boys' and girls' categories to compete in the Asia-Pacific Junior Championship. In a reciprocal arrangement, the EGA invites APHC to send up to 4 players to compete in the European Young Masters for the individual titles.

=== No longer contested ===
Former EGA championships that has been discontinued:

- EGA Trophy (1967–1994)
- European Youths' Team Championship (1961–2006)
- European Lady Junior's Team Championship (1968–2006)

== Awards ==
=== European Amateur Golfer of the Year ===
The EGA publishes the European Amateur Golf Rankings, updated weekly. Every year since 2005, the EGA has awarded medals to recognize the top three players each season, for both men and women. The season ranking (based on points scored in the World Amateur Golf Ranking) ends the week before the start of European Tour Q-School (around the end of August). It is the European forerunner of the Mark H. McCormack Medal, introduced in 2007 (men) and 2011 (women).

=== Women ===
Women's European Amateur Golfer of the Year (2005–2026)

Year	Gold	Silver	Bronze
2005	(France) Alexandra Vilatte	(Spain) María Hernández	(Scotland) Clare Queen
2006	(Spain) Belén Mozo	(Sweden) Anna Nordqvist	(France) Isabelle Boineau
2007	(Germany) Sandra Gal	(Sweden) Anna Nordqvist	(Spain) Carlota Ciganda
2008	(Spain) Carlota Ciganda	(Spain) María Hernández	(Sweden) Anna Nordqvist
2009	(France) Lucie André	(Netherlands) Marieke Nivard	(Republic of Ireland) Danielle McVeigh
2010	(Sweden) Caroline Hedwall	(Republic of Ireland) Leona Maguire	(Spain) Marta Silva
2011	(Republic of Ireland) Stephanie Meadow	(Republic of Ireland) Leona Maguire	(England) Charley Hull
2012	(England) Georgia Hall	(England) Charley Hull	(Republic of Ireland) Stephanie Meadow
2013	(Denmark) Emily Kristine Pedersen	(Republic of Ireland) Stephanie Meadow	(England) Georgia Hall
2014	(Denmark) Nanna Madsen	(France) Céline Boutier	(Spain) Noemi Jimenez Martín
2015	(Republic of Ireland) Leona Maguire^	(Spain) María Parra Luque	(England) Bronte Law
2016	(Republic of Ireland) Leona Maguire^ (2)	(England) Bronte Law	(Spain) María Parra Luque
2017	(Republic of Ireland) Leona Maguire^ (3)	(Switzerland) Albane Valenzuela	(Sweden) Julia Engström
2018	(Switzerland) Albane Valenzuela	(Sweden) Frida Kinhult	(Spain) Ainhoa Olarra
2019	(Sweden) Frida Kinhult	(Switzerland) Albane Valenzuela	(Italy) Alessia Nobilio
2020	(Sweden) Ingrid Lindblad	(France) Pauline Roussin-Bouchard	(Sweden) Linn Grant
2021	(Sweden) Ingrid Lindblad (2)	(Sweden) Beatrice Wallin	(Austria) Emma Spitz
2022	(Sweden) Ingrid Lindblad (3)	(England) Caley McGinty	(Denmark) Amalie Leth-Nissen
2023	(Sweden) Ingrid Lindblad^ (4)	(Spain) Cayetana Fernández	(Spain) Julia López Ramírez
2024	(England) Lottie Woad	(Spain) Julia López Ramírez	(France) Adéla Cernousek
2025	(Spain) Paula Martín Sampedro	(Spain) Andrea Revuelta Goicoechea	(Sweden) Meja Örtengren
2026	(Spain) Paula Martín Sampedro (2)	(Spain) Andrea Revuelta Goicoechea	(Sweden) Meja Örtengren

^Also awarded the Mark H. McCormack Medal

=== Men ===
Men's European Amateur Golfer of the Year (2005–2026)

Year	Gold	Silver	Bronze
2005	(Scotland) Lloyd Saltman	(Italy) Edoardo Molinari	(Netherlands) Joost Luiten
2006	(Republic of Ireland) Rory McIlroy	(England) Jamie Moul	(France) Julien Guerrier
2007	(England) Danny Willett	(England) John Parry	(England) David Horsey
2008	(Republic of Ireland) Shane Lowry	(Germany) Stephan Gross	(Spain) Jorge Campillo
2009	(Italy) Matteo Manassero	(France) Victor Dubuisson	(England) Sam Hutsby
2010	(France) Romain Wattel	(Italy) Andrea Pavan	(Scotland) James Byrne
2011	(England) Andrew Sullivan	(England) Tom Lewis	(England) Jack Senior
2012	(Netherlands) Daan Huizing	(Austria) Matthias Schwab	(Sweden) Robert S. Karlsson
2013	(England) Matt Fitzpatrick^	(England) Max Orrin	(Denmark) Sebastian Cappelen
2014	(Spain) Mario Galiano	(Sweden) Marcus Kinhult	(Italy) Renato Paratore
2015	(Spain) Jon Rahm^	(Sweden) Marcus Kinhult	(England) Ashley Chesters
2016	(England) Sam Horsfield	(Spain) Iván Cantero	(Austria) Matthias Schwab
2017	(England) Scott Gregory	(Scotland) Connor Syme	(Germany) Maximilian Schmitt
2018	(Norway) Viktor Hovland	(England) Matthew Jordan	(Denmark) Nicolai Højgaard
2019	(England) Conor Gough	(Scotland) Euan Walker	(England) Benjamin Schmidt
2020	(Scotland) Sandy Scott	(Spain) Eduard Rousaud Sabaté	(Republic of Ireland) James Sugrue
2021	(Sweden) Ludvig Åberg	(England) Alex Fitzpatrick	(Spain) David Puig
2022	(Sweden) Ludvig Åberg (2)	(Spain) David Puig	(England) Sam Bairstow
2023	(England) John Gough	(Denmark) Frederik Kjettrup	(Spain) José Luis Ballester
2024	(Spain) José Luis Ballester	(Scotland) Calum Scott	(Denmark) Jacob Skov Olesen
2025	(Czech Republic) Filip Jakubčík	(England) Tyler Weaver	(Iceland) Gunnlaugur Árni Sveinsson
2026	(England) Tyler Weaver	(England) Luke Poulter	(Germany) Tim Wiedemeyer

^Also awarded the Mark H. McCormack Medal

== See also ==
- The R&A
