= European Senior Ladies' Championship =

Amateur golf tournament

The European Senior Ladies' Championship is an annual European amateur golf championship for women over 50 (previously 55) organized by the European Golf Association.

The inaugural event was held in 1996, with 25 editions have been contested so far. It is now played in conjunction with the European Senior Men's Championship.

== Format ==
The championship is opened to women aged above 50 years old.

The format of this competition consists of three rounds of stroke play, with a cut after the second round out of which the lowest 33 ladies' scores can qualify for the final round.

== Past results ==
Year	Venue, Location	Winner	Runner(s)-up	Third place
2023	Douglas Golf Club, Ireland	(Republic of Ireland) Alison Taylor, 217	(Belgium) Sylvie Clausset, 218 (Sweden) Charlotte Ödman, 218	–
2022	Pärnu Bay Golf Links, Estonia	(Australia) Sue Wooster, 225	(Denmark) Lotte Greve, 233	(Sweden) Anna Lundin, 234
2021	Golf de Morfontaine, France	(France) Christine Petit Martin, 219	(Germany) Alexandra Kölker, 223	(Switzerland) Sophie Ducrey, 223
2020	Golf Club d'Hossegor, France	(Spain) María De Orueta, 221	(Spain) Maria Castillo Dolagaray, 222	(France) Christine Petit Martin, 222
2019	Golf Patriziale Ascona, Switzerland	(Spain) Macarena Campomanes, 207	(Republic of Ireland) Laura Webb, 214	(France) Christine Petit Martin, 217
2018	Royal Bled Golf Club, Slovenia	(Spain) Macarena Campomanes, 232	(Germany) Susanne Lichtenberg, 238	(Spain) María De Orueta, 239
2017	GC Schloss Schönborn, Austria	(Germany) Susanne Lichtenberg, 231	(Spain) Macarena Campomanes, 231	(Sweden) Maria Liberg, 233
2016	Pula Golf, Spain	(Spain) Macarena Campomanes, 225	(Belgium) Sylvie Van Molle, 226	(Germany) Caroline Effert, 227
2015	Pannonia G&CC, Hungary	(Spain) María De Orueta, 220	(Finland) Minna Kaarnalahti, 224	(Spain) Macarena Campomanes, 228
2014	R.C.G. Puerta de Hierro, Spain	(Wales) Jane Rees, 223	(Spain) María De Orueta, 230	(Finland) Minna Kaarnalahti, 232
2013	Estonian G&CC, Estonia	(Sweden) Helene Maxe, 221	(Finland) Anna-Maria Lehtonen, 224	(Spain) Maria De Orueta, 225
2012	Golf & Landclub Achensee, Austria	(Spain) Rocio Ruiz De Velasco, 221	(Germany) Chris Utermarck, 223	(Belgium) Isabelle Dumont, 226
2011	Golf & Landclub Achensee, Austria	(France) Cécilia Mourgue d'Algue, 217	(France) Virginie Burrus, 223	(Spain) Catalina Castillejo, 224
2010	Golf & Landclub Achensee, Austria	(France) Virginie Burrus, 221	(Italy) Guenda Preti Moavero, 233	(Republic of Ireland) Helen Jones, 233
2009	Porto Carras, Greece	(France) Virginie Burrus, 222	(Switzerland) Mimmi Guglielmone, 226	(Sweden) Viveca Hoff, 229
2008	Oceanico (Pinhal), Portugal	(France) Virginie Burrus, 225	(Spain) Vicky Pertierra, 231	(France) Cécilia Mourgue d'Algue, 233
2007	Vilamoura (Old Course), Portugal	(France) Virginie Burrus, 220	(France) Cécilia Mourgue d'Algue, 223	(Italy) Marina Buscaini, 228
2006	Ribagolfe, Portugal	(Sweden) Gunilla Ekman, 146	(Germany) Karin Gumpert, 149	(Sweden) Viveka Hoff, 152
2005	Golf de Chantilly, France	(France) Cécilia Mourgue d'Algue, 222	(England) Carole Caldwell, 234	(Spain) Cristina Marsans, 237
2004	La Baule, France	(Sweden) Maj-Britt Heden, 220	(Germany) Rita Ruland, 223	(France) Cécilia Mourgue d'Algue, 224
2003	Chantaco, France	(France) Claudine Cros Chatrier, 221	(Spain) Vicky Pertierra, 221	(Sweden) Maj-Britt Heden, 222
2002	La Manga Club, Spain	(France) Cécilia Mourgue d'Algue, 220	(Spain) Vicky Pertierra, 231	(Italy) Clotilde Costa, 231
2001	Torremirona GC, Spain	(France) Cécilia Mourgue d'Algue, 219	(Spain) Vicky Pertierra, 225	(Germany) Eva Maeker, 227
2000	La Manga Club, Spain	(France) Cécilia Mourgue d'Algue, 226	(Germany) Rita Ruland, 228	(Spain) Vicky Pertierra, 233
1999	Ascona Golf Club, Switzerland	(Germany) Rita Ruland, 215	(France) Cécilia Mourgue d'Algue, 224	(Spain) Beatriz Ramirez De Haro, 226
1998	Ascona Golf Club, Switzerland	(Germany) Rita Ruland, 215	(France) Cécilia Mourgue d'Algue, 215	(France) Laurence Neuhaus, 230
1997	Ascona Golf Club, Switzerland	(France) Cécilia Mourgue d'Algue, 147	(Spain) Cristina Marsans, 149	(Germany) Rita Ruland, 150
1996	Royal Hague Golf Club, Netherlands	(Germany) Rita Ruland, 224	(Spain) Victoria Pertierra, 234	(France) Claudine Chatrier, 236

== Nations Cup ==
From 2000 to 2006, a Nations Cup was contested. This was discontinued when a separate European Senior Ladies' Team Championship was introduced.

Year	Winner	Runner-up	Third place
2005	France (308); A. Lanrezac; C. Mourgue d'algue L. Neuhaus	Sweden (318); M.-B. Heden; V. Hoff; G. Ekman	Spain (320); C. Marsans; B. Ramirez de Haro; R. Rodriguez-Donovan
2004	Germany (297); E. Annison; E. Jacob; R. Ruland	Sweden (299); M.-B. Heden; V. Hoff; G. Nordgren	France (305); F. Freiss; C. Mourgue d'algue M.-C. Ubald Bocquet
2003	Sweden (298); Ch. Birke, A-K. Hermansson; V. Hoff	Spain (300); C. Marsans; V. Pertierra; B. Ramirez de Haro	France (302); F. Freiss; C. Mourgue d'Algue; L. Neuhaus
2002	France (307); C. Mourgue d'Algue; L. Neuhaus; C. Pequignot	Spain (307); I. Lorenzana Diez; V. Pertierra; B. Ramirez de Haro	Germany (314); U. Eichler; E. Maker; R. Ruland
2001	France (301); C. Mourgue d'Algue; F. Mourgue d'Algue; L. Neuhaus	Germany (305); U. Eichler; K. Gumpert; R. Ruland	Spain (306); C. Marsans; V. Pertierra; B. Ramirez de Haro
2000	Germany (306); K. Gumpert; C. Rassman; R. Ruland	France (306); C. Chatrier; C. Mourgue d'Algue; L. Neuhaus	Spain (311); C. Marsans; V. Pertierra; B. Ramirez de Haro

== See also ==
- European Senior Men's Championship – corresponding EGA event for men
- U.S. Senior Women's Amateur – corresponding USGA event
