= European Senior Men's Team Championship =

The European Senior Men's Team Championship is a European amateur golf championship for men over 50 (previously 55) organized by the European Golf Association.

The inaugural event was held in 2006 and the match is played every year.

Before the event was introduced, a Nations Cup was contested as part of the European Senior Men's Championship between 2000 and 2005.

== Format ==
The age limit to enter this competition is above 50 years old.

The format consists of 20 teams, each of 6 players, competing in two rounds of stroke play, out of which the five lowest scores from each team's six players will count each day. The total addition of the five lowest scores will constitute the team's score and determine which team is qualified for the last three rounds of match play, during which all teams will play a one foursome and four singles match format.

== Results ==
Year	Venue	Winner	Runner-up	Bronze
2025	Diamond Country Club, Austria	Ireland	France	Denmark
2024	BlackSeaRama Golf Resort & Villa, Bulgaria	France	Sweden	Ireland
2023	Royal GC Mariánské Lázně, Czech Republic	England	France	Ireland
2022	Estonian G&CC, Estonia	Sweden	England	Ireland
2021	Sedin GC, Slovakia	Germany	France	Ireland
2020	Diamond CC, Austria	Denmark	Italy	Germany
2019	Rungsted GC, Denmark	England	Ireland	Scotland
2018	Diamond CC, Austria	Germany	Spain	Ireland
2017	PGA Sweden National, Sweden	Ireland	Denmark	England
2016	Diners G&CC, Slovenia	Scotland	Germany	England
2015	Pravets GC, Bulgaria	Ireland	Italy	Scotland
2014	Sierra GC, Poland	Ireland	Sweden	England
2013	Pannonia G&CC, Hungary	Ireland	Sweden	England
2012	Estoril GC, Portugal	Sweden	Germany	England
2011	Troia GC, Portugal	Sweden	Netherlands	Spain
2010	Fairhaven GC, England	England	Ireland	Scotland
2009	Ascona GC, Switzerland	England	Sweden	Ireland
2008	Shannon GC, Ireland	Ireland	Scotland	Germany
2007	Bled GC, Slovenia	Ireland	Scotland	England
2006	Ruuhikoski GC, Finland	Scotland	Ireland	England

== Winning nations' summary ==
Country	Winner	Runner-up
Ireland	6	3
Sweden	3	3
England	3	1
Scotland	2	2
Germany	2	2
Denmark	1	1
Italy	0	2
Netherlands	0	1
Spain	0	1
France	0	1
Total	17	17

== See also ==
- European Senior Men's Championship – corresponding individual EGA event
- European Senior Ladies' Team Championship – corresponding EGA event for women
