= Tipsport Golf Masters =

Coordinates: 49.44°N 13.22°E

Tournament information
- Location: Plzeň, Czech Republic
- Established: 2011
- Course: Golf Park Plzeň – Dýšina
- Par: 71
- Tour: Ladies European Tour
- Format: Stroke play
- Prize fund: €250,000
- Month played: June
- Final year: 2016

Tournament record score
- Aggregate: 196 Julie Greciet (2014)
- To par: −17 Julie Greciet (2014)

Final champion
- (Denmark) Nanna Koerstz Madsen

Location in the Czech Republic

The Tipsport Golf Masters was a golf tournament on the Ladies European Tour. It was played at the Golf Park Plzeň – Dýšina in Plzeň, Czech Republic.

Tournament names through the years:

- 2011–2012 Raiffeisenbank Prague Golf Masters
- 2013 Honma Pilsen Golf Masters
- 2014 Sberbank Golf Masters
- 2015−2016 Tipsport Golf Masters

== Winners ==
Year	Course	Location	Winner	Country	Score
2016	Golf Park Plzeň – Dýšina	Plzeň	Nanna Koerstz Madsen	Denmark	198 (−15)
2015	Golf Park Plzeň – Dýšina	Plzeň	Hannah Burke	England	200 (−13)
2014	Golf Park Plzeň – Dýšina	Plzeň	Julie Greciet	France	196 (−17)
2013	Golf Park Plzeň – Dýšina	Plzeň	Ann-Kathrin Lindner	Germany	201 (−12)
2012	Albatross Golf Resort	Prague	Melissa Reid	England	207 (−9)
2011	Albatross Golf Resort	Prague	Jade Schaeffer	France	203 (−13)
