= European Senior Ladies' Team Championship =

Team golf tournament

The European Senior Ladies' Team Championship is a European amateur golf championship for women over 50 (previously 55) organized by the European Golf Association.

The inaugural event was held in 2006 and the match is played every year.

Before the event was introduced a Nations Cup was contested as part of the European Senior Ladies' Championship between 2000 and 2005.

== Format ==
The age limit to enter this competition is above 50 years old.

The format consists of 20 teams, each of 6 players, competing in two rounds of stroke play, out of which the five lowest scores from each team's six players will count each day. The total addition of the five lowest scores will constitute the team's score and determine which team is qualified for the last three rounds of match play, with all teams will play a one foursome and four singles match format.

== Results ==
Year	Venue	Winner	Runner-up
2023	Parador El Saler Golf, Spain	Spain	Ireland
2022	Golf Arboretum, Slovenia	Germany	Sweden
2021	BlackSeaRama Golf Resort & Villas, Bulgaria	Spain	Germany
2020	Cancelled due to pandemic		
2019	BlackSeaRama Golf Resort & Villas, Bulgaria	England	Spain
2018	Mont Garni GC, Belgium	Germany	Sweden
2017	Golf Resort Skalica, Slovakia	France	England
2016	Sierra GC, Poland	Ireland	Belgium
2015	National Golf Resort, Lithuania	France	England
2014	Gut Altentann, Austria	England	France
2013	Bled GC, Slovenia	Ireland	Italy
2012	Lugano GC, Switzerland	Italy	France
2011	Blacksearama Golf, Bulgaria	France	Spain
2010	Sporting Club Berlin, Germany	Scotland	England
2009	Dun Laoghaire, Ireland	Germany	Italy
2008	Wouwse Plantage, Netherlands	Sweden	Spain
2007	Royal Drottningholm GC, Sweden	France	England
2006	Royal Waterloo GC, Belgium	France	England

== Winning nations' summary ==
Country	Winner	Runner-up
France	5	2
England	2	5
Germany	2	0
Ireland	2	0
Italy	1	2
Sweden	1	1
Scotland	1	0
Spain	0	3
Belgium	0	1
Total	14	14

== See also ==
- European Senior Ladies' Championship – corresponding individual EGA event
- European Senior Men's Team Championship – corresponding EGA event for men
