= Renate Grimstad =

Norwegian professional golfer (born 1997)

Renate Hjelle Grimstad
Personal information
- Nationality: Norway
- Born: 24 January 1997 (age 29) Bergen, Norway
- Height: 170 cm (5 ft 7 in)

Career
- Sport: Golf
- College: University of Miami
- Turned professional: 2022
- Former tour: Ladies European Tour (joined 2023)
- Professional wins: 1

Achievements and awards
- Dinah Shore Trophy Award: 2020

Renate Hjelle Grimstad (born 24 January 1997) is a Norwegian professional golfer and Ladies European Tour player. She won the 2020 Dinah Shore Trophy Award as a top female collegiate golfer and the 2024 Norwegian National Golf Championship.

== Amateur career ==
Grimstad started to play golf at age 7, and became a member of the Norway National Team at age 12. She represented Norway at the European Girls' Team Championship and World Junior Girls Championship as a junior, and later at the European Ladies' Team Championship and the World Amateur Team Championship for the Espirito Santo Trophy. In 2019, she finished runner-up at The Spirit International Amateur Golf Championship in Texas, both individually and with the Norwegian team.

She played in the 2015 Larvik Ladies Open, an LET Access Series event, and finished 3 strokes behind winner Johanna Gustavsson. Grimstad finished tied 4th at the 2016 European Ladies Amateur in Sweden, 4 strokes behind champion Bronte Law. She finished runner-up at the Norwegian National Golf Championship in 2015, 2017 and 2018, and lost the final of the 2017 Norwegian National Match Play Championship to Tina Mazarino.

Grimstad spent five years at University of Miami between 2016 and 2021. Playing with the Miami Hurricanes women's golf team, she won the 2020 UCF Challenge by a record 7 shots with rounds of 66, 67 and 69 for a total 14 under par. In her penultimate year, she set a new overall school scoring record at 71.00 and was awarded the Dinah Shore Trophy Award for her collegiate performance.

== Professional career ==
Grimstad turned professional in 2022 after taking some time off after graduating from college. She was invited to play a few events on the LET Access Series and finished third at her second event as a professional at the Elite Hotels Open in Sweden, after she shot an opening day 63 to hold the lead.

She joined the 2023 Ladies European Tour after finishing tied 34th at Q-School. In her rookie season, she made her first cut at the Jabra Ladies Open and recorded her first top-10 at the Helsingborg Open.

== Amateur wins ==
- 2013 Norgescup 3
- 2014 Titleist Tour 5
- 2018 Titleist Tour 1
- 2020 UCF Challenge

== Professional wins (1) ==
=== Other wins (1) ===
- 2024 Norwegian National Golf Championship

== Team appearances ==
Amateur

- European Young Masters: (representing Norway): 2013
- Duke of York Young Champions Trophy: (representing Norway): 2014, 2015
- World Junior Girls Championship: (representing Norway): 2015
- European Girls' Team Championship: (representing Norway): 2013, 2014, 2015
- European Ladies' Team Championship: (representing Norway): 2016, 2017
- Espirito Santo Trophy: (representing Norway): 2016, 2018
- The Spirit International Amateur Golf Championship: (representing Norway): 2019
