= Tubert =

Tubert is a surname. Notable people with the surname include:

- Emily Tubert (born 1992), American golfer
- Marcelo Tubert (born 1952), Argentine-born American actor
