= Natascha Fink =

Austrian professional golfer (born 1970)

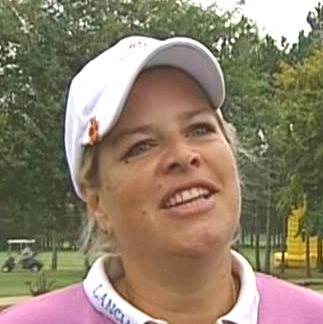
- Fink in 2006

Personal information
- Full name: Natascha Birgit Großschädl-Fink
- Nickname: Nash
- Nationality: Austria
- Born: 8 October 1970 (age 56) New York, New York, U.S.
- Height: 170 cm (5 ft 7 in)
- Life partner: Erwin
- Children: 1

Career
- Sport: Golf
- College: University of Graz
- Turned professional: 1993
- Former tours: Ladies European Tour (1994–2008); LPGA Tour (1997–2001)

Best results in LPGA major championships
- Chevron Championship: DNP
- Women's PGA C'ship: CUT: 1998, 2002
- U.S. Women's Open: CUT: 1998
- Women's British Open: T31: 2004

Natascha Birgit Großschädl-Fink (born 8 October 1970) is an Austrian professional golfer. She became Austria's first professional golfer in 1993, and played on the LPGA Tour and Ladies European Tour. She was runner-up at the 2004 Open de France Dames.

== Biography ==
Fink was born in New York in 1970, and returned to Austria with her parents when she was 3 years old. She become the best amateur golfer in Austria in the early 1990s. At 17, she joined the National Team, and at the age of 20 she experienced her first international success.

In 1993, she became the first professional golfer in Austria, male or female. She became the first Austrian golfer to play professionally on the Ladies European Tour in 1994. She carded eight birdies in 10 holes in the 1995 Woodpecker Women's Welsh Open, and finished tied 3rd at the 1996 Guardian Irish Open.

In 1997, she also joined the LPGA Tour in the United States, where her best finish was a tie for 20th at the 2001 Michelob Light Classic.

In 2004, she finished runner-up at the Open de France Dames, two strokes behind winner Stephanie Arricau, and made her first cut in a major championship at the 2004 Women's British Open. She made a hole-in-one in the 4th round at Sunningdale Golf Club's 8th hole, and went on to finish tied 31st.

Fink represented her country with Tina Schneeberger at the 2005 Women's World Cup of Golf in South Africa, where the pair finished tied 20th.

In 2009, after suffering back injuries, Fink ended her career as a touring professional and became a PGA Teaching Professional at her home club, GC Murhof near Graz.

== Amateur wins ==
- 1990 Slovenian International Championship
- 1991 Slovenian International Championship
- 1992 Austrian Strokeplay Championship
- 1993 Swiss International Championship, Austrian International Championship

== Results in LPGA majors ==
Tournament	1998	1999	2000	2001	2002	2003	2004
Women's PGA Championship	CUT				CUT		
U.S. Women's Open	CUT						
Women's British Open^				CUT			T31

^ The Women's British Open became an LPGA major in 2001

Did not play

CUT = missed the half-way cut
"T" = tied

== Team appearances ==
Amateur

- European Ladies' Team Championship (representing Austria): 1993

Professional

- Women's World Cup of Golf (representing Austria): 2005
