= Delphine Bourson =

French golfer

Personal information
- Full name: Delphine Bourson-Drossaert
- Nationality: France
- Born: 26 April 1969 (age 57)

Career
- Sport: Golf
- Status: Amateur

Delphine Bourson-Drossaert (born 26 April 1969) is a French golfer. She won the European Ladies Amateur in 1991.

== Amateur career ==
Bourson won the 1990 Spanish International Ladies Amateur Championship at El Bosque. At the European Ladies Amateur, Bourson lost a playoff to Florence Descampe of Belgium in 1988, and won the event in 1991, three strokes ahead of Mette Hageman of the Netherlands.

Bourson was a member of the winning French team, with Cécilia Mourgue d'Algue, Caroline Bourtayre, Sophie Louapre, Sandrine Mendiburu and Valérie Pamard, at the 1989 European Ladies' Team Championship in Pals, Spain.

Bourson represented France at the Espirito Santo Trophy with Kristel Mourgue d'Algue twice. In 1990 with Sandrine Mendiburu they finished 6th, and in 1992 with Patricia Meunier-Lebouc they finished 5th.

She played in the 1989, 1991 and 1993 Vagliano Trophy representing the Continent of Europe.

== Amateur wins ==
- 1990 Spanish International Ladies Amateur Championship
- 1991 International European Ladies Amateur Championship

== Team appearances ==
Amateur

- European Ladies' Team Championship (representing France): 1989 (winners), 1991, 1993
- Vagliano Trophy (representing the Continent of Europe): 1989, 1991, 1993
- Espirito Santo Trophy (representing France): 1990, 1992
