= Stora Lundby Ladies Open =

Professional golf tournament

Tournament information
- Location: Gråbo, Sweden
- Established: 1987
- Course: Stora Lundby Golf Club
- Tour: Swedish Golf Tour
- Format: 54-hole stroke play
- Prize fund: SEK 75,000
- Final year: 1991

Tournament record score
- Aggregate: 219 Mette Hageman (1991)
- To par: +3 as above

Final champion
- (Netherlands) Mette Hageman

The Stora Lundby Ladies Open was a women's professional golf tournament on the Swedish Golf Tour played between 1987 and 1991. It was always held at Stora Lundby Golf Club in Gråbo, Sweden.

== Winners ==
Year	Winner	Score	Margin of victory	Runner(s)-up	Prize fund (SEK)	Ref
1991	(Netherlands) Mette Hageman (a)	+3 (72-75-72=219)	2 strokes	(Sweden) Marie Wennersten-From	75,000^{1}	
1990	(Sweden) Annika Sörenstam (a)	+12 (76-77-39=192)^{2}	1 stroke	(Sweden) Anna-Carin Jonasson (Sweden) Pia Nilsson	75,000^{1}	
1989	(Sweden) Pia Nilsson	+10 (74-75-77=226)	2 strokes	(Sweden) Annika Sörenstam	75,000	
1988: No tournament
1987	(Norway) Cathrine Schröder	+14 (76-77-77=230)	Playoff^{3}	(Sweden) Elisabet Johanson (Sweden) Marie Wennersten	50,000	

Notes

- ^{1} As the winner was an amateur, she received no prize money and the first prize was given to the second placed player or shared between the second placed players.
- ^{2} 54-hole tournament shortened to 45 holes.
- ^{3} Schröder won sudden-death playoff on first extra hole.
