= Pernille Carlson Pedersen =

Danish female golfer

Personal information
- Nationality: Denmark
- Born: Holbæk, Denmark

Career
- Sport: Golf
- Status: Amateur

Achievements and awards
- Danish Golfer of the Year (Den Gyldne Golfbold): 1992

Pernille Carlson Pedersen is a Danish amateur golfer. She won the 1992 British Ladies Amateur.

== Career ==
Carlson Pedersen is from Holbæk and had a successful amateur career. She won the inaugural Danish Junior Championship in 1983, and both the Danish Stroke Play Championship (DM Slagspil) and Danish Match Play Championship (DM Holspil) in 1990.

She appeared three times in the Höganäs Ladies Open on the Swedish Golf Tour, with a best finish of tied 6th place in 1990, 4 strokes behind winner Annika Sörenstam.

In 1992, she won the final of the British Ladies Amateur 1 up over Joanne Morley at Saunton Golf Club. For this achievement she was named Danish Golfer of the Year, and received Den Gyldne Golfbold from the Danish Golf Union.

Carlson Pedersen represented Denmark three times at the European Ladies' Team Championship, and recorded an individual tied 4th-place finish in 1991 at Wentworth Club in England.

She played in the 1992 Espirito Santo Trophy in Vancouver, Canada, where her team finished 22nd.

Carlson Pedersen elected to not turn professional and became a schoolteacher.

== Amateur wins ==
- 1983 Danish Junior Championship
- 1990 Danish Match Play Championship, Danish Stroke Play Championship
- 1992 British Ladies Amateur
- 1993 Danish Match Play Championship
- 2006 Danish Mid-Amateur Championship

== Team appearances ==
Amateur

- European Ladies' Team Championship (representing Denmark): 1989, 1991, 1993
- Espirito Santo Trophy (representing Denmark): 1992
