= Ansvar Ladies Open =

Tournament information
- Location: Vimmerby, Sweden
- Established: 1989
- Course: Tobo Golf Club
- Par: 72
- Tour: Swedish Golf Tour
- Format: 54-hole stroke play
- Prize fund: SEK 75,000
- Final year: 1991

Tournament record score
- Aggregate: 290 Anna Berg
- To par: +2 as above

Final champion
- (Sweden) Anna Berg

The Ansvar Ladies Open was a women's professional golf tournament on the Swedish Golf Tour, played between 1989 and 1991. It was always held at Tobo Golf Club in Vimmerby, Sweden.

The event was introduced in 1989 as one of the only new regular events of the season, in addition to the Grundig Team Trophy.

The 1990 and 1991 events doubled as Swedish International tournaments.

== Winners ==
Year	Winner	Score	Margin of victory	Runner(s)-up	Prize fund (SEK)	Ref
1991	(Sweden) Anna Berg (a)	290 (+2)	7 strokes	(Sweden) Marie Wennersten-From	75,000	
1990	(Sweden) Margareta Bjurö	297	4 strokes	(Sweden) Marie Wennersten-From	100,000	
1989	(Sweden) Jennifer Posener (a)	183	1 stroke	(Sweden) Pia Nilsson	75,000	

== See also ==
- Swedish International
