= Laura Navarro =

Spanish professional golfer (born 1974)

Personal information
- Nationality: Spain
- Born: 13 December 1974 (age 51) Madrid, Spain

Career
- Sport: Golf
- Turned professional: 1993
- Former tour: Ladies European Tour
- Professional wins: 1
Medal record
Mediterranean Games
Gold medal – first place	1993 Languedoc-Roussillon	Women's team

Laura Navarro (born 13 December 1974) is a Spanish professional golfer and former member of the Ladies European Tour. She won the 1992 Espirito Santo Trophy.

== Career ==
Navarro was born in Madrid and had a successful amateur career around Europe. She won the 1991 Austrian Ladies Amateur and the 1992 Portuguese Ladies Amateur. In 1991, she was runner-up at the Spanish Ladies Amateur and the French International Lady Juniors Amateur Championship, losing to Sandrine Mendiburu. In 1992, she was runner-up at the French Ladies Amateur, beaten in the final by to compatriot Estefania Knuth.

She won the 1992 Espirito Santo Trophy in Vancouver, Canada together with Macarena Campomanes and Estefania Knuth, and won the team gold together with Marina Arruti and Knuth at the 1993 Mediterranean Games in France.

Navarro turned professional in November 1993 and joined the Ladies European Tour. Her best finishes was runner-up at the 1996 Women's Welsh Open and the 1997 Ladies Irish Open. She finished 10th on the 1996 LET Order of Merit.

After retiring from tour, she was a club pro at Campo de Golf El Saler in València between 2000 and 2011.

== Amateur wins ==
- 1991 Austrian Ladies Amateur
- 1992 Portuguese Ladies Amateur
- 1993 Biarritz Cup

== Professional wins (1) ==
- 2000 Campeonato Comunidad Valenciana

== Team appearances ==
Amateur

- European Girls' Team Championship (representing Spain): 1991 (winners)
- European Lady Junior's Team Championship (representing Spain): 1992 (winners)
- European Ladies' Team Championship (representing Spain): 1993
- Vagliano Trophy (representing the Continent of Europe): 1991, 1993
- Espirito Santo Trophy: (representing Spain): 1992 (winners)
