= Marita Engzelius =

Norwegian professional golfer (born 1988)

Personal information
- Nationality: Norway
- Born: 9 February 1988 (age 38) Bærum, Norway
- Height: 5 ft 5 in (1.65 m)

Career
- Sport: Golf
- College: University of Tulsa
- Turned professional: 2013
- Former tours: Symetra Tour; Ladies European Tour
- Professional wins: 2

Number of wins by tour
- Epson Tour: 1

Marita Engzelius (born 9 February 1988) is a retired Norwegian professional golfer, who played on the Symetra Tour and the Ladies European Tour. She won the Symetra Tour Championship and was runner-up at the New South Wales Women's Open.

== Amateur career ==
Engzelius won the Norwegian National Golf Championship three times (2007, 2010 and 2012) and was awarded the Kongepokal. She represented Norway at the Espirito Santo Trophy in 2010 and 2012.

Playing golf at the University of Tulsa between 2009 and 2012, she was a three-time All-Conference USA selection.

== Professional career ==
Engzelius turned professional after finishing 24th at the LPGA Final Qualifying Tournament in December 2012, where she earned a place on the Symetra Tour and limited category for the 2013 LPGA Tour.

She played on the Symetra Tour from 2013 to 2017. In 2014 she eagled the first playoff hole to win the season-ending Symetra Tour Championship, to finish 15th on the money list.

Engzelius was successful at the Ladies European Tour's qualifying school in 2017, and played on the LET 2018 and 2019. She won the season opener in the LET Access Series, the Terre Blanche Ladies Open held in France, in April 2018. Her best finish on the LET was runner-up at the 2018 New South Wales Women's Open in Australia, two strokes behind Meghan MacLaren.

After 7 years on tour she announced her retirement at the Open de España Femenino in December 2019.

=== Amateur wins ===
- 2007 Norwegian National Golf Championship
- 2010 Norwegian National Golf Championship
- 2012 Norwegian National Golf Championship

== Professional wins (2) ==
=== Symetra Tour (1) ===
No.	Date	Tournament	Winning score	To par	Margin of victory	Runner(s)-up
1	4 Jul 2014	Symetra Tour Championship	278	−10	Playoff	(United States) Demi Runas (United States) Jackie Stoelting

=== LET Access Series wins (1) ===
No.	Date	Tournament	Winning score	To par	Margin of victory	Runner(s)-up
1	3 Oct 2018	Terre Blanche Ladies Open	67-69=136	−8	3 strokes	(Sweden) Emma Nilsson

== Team appearances ==
Amateur

- European Ladies' Team Championship (representing Norway): 2008, 2009, 2010, 2011
- Espirito Santo Trophy (representing Norway): 2010, 2012

Professional

- European Championships (representing Norway): 2018
