= European Ladies Amateur Championship =

Golf tournament

The European Ladies Amateur Championship is an annual amateur golf tournament. It is organized by the European Golf Association and is one of the "elite" tournaments recognized by the World Amateur Golf Ranking.

The championship was first played in 1986 and was called the International European Ladies Amateur Championship until 2015. There have been 33 editions contested so far, with many past winners and medallists of this championship are now members of the professional ranks.

== Format ==
The top 144 ladies golfers compete for the win in a format consisting of four rounds of stroke play, with a cut after the third round, out of which the lowest 60 ladies' scores, including ties, qualify for the final round.

== Winners ==
Year	Venue	Location	Player	Country	Score	To par	Margin of victory	Runner(s)-up
2026	Allerum Golf Club	Sweden	Charlotte Naughton	England	280	−8	2 strokes	(Sweden) Meja Örtengren
2025	Frankfurter Golf Club	Germany	Paula Martín Sampedro	Spain	269	−23	1 stroke	(Spain) Balma Dávalos
2024	Messilä Golf	Finland	Louise Rydqvist	Sweden	274	−14	3 strokes	(Spain) Andrea Revuelta
2023	Tegelberga Golfklubb	Sweden	Julia López	Spain	276	−8	2 strokes	(Spain) Carla Bernat
2022	Golf de Saint Germain	France	Savannah De Bock	Belgium	269	−19	Playoff	(England) Charlotte Heath
2021	Royal Park i Roveri	Italy	Ingrid Lindblad	Sweden	276	−12	3 strokes	(Germany) Alexandra Försterling
2020	CUBO Golf	Slovenia	Paula Schulz-Hanssen	Germany	271	−13	Playoff	(France) Chloé Salort
2019	Parkstone Golf Club	England	Alice Hewson	England	281	−7	Playoff	(Finland) Krista Junkkari
2018	Penati Golf Resort	Slovakia	Celia Barquín	Spain	272	−16	1 stroke	(Germany) Esther Henseleit
2017	Lausanne Golf Club	Switzerland	Agathe Laisné	France	280	−8	1 stroke	(Switzerland) Albane Valenzuela
2016	Hooks Golf Club	Sweden	Bronte Law	England	277	−11	1 stroke	(Belgium) Leslie Cloots
2015	Murhof Golf Club	Austria	María Parra	Spain	273	−15	2 strokes	(India) Aditi Ashok
2014	Estonian G&CC	Estonia	Luna Sobrón	Spain	278	−10	Playoff	(Spain) Noemí Jiménez
2013	Aura Golf Club	Finland	Emily Kristine Pedersen	Denmark	276	−8	3 strokes	(Belgium) Laura Gonzalez Escallon
2012	Diners G&CC Ljubljana	Slovenia	Céline Boutier	France	268	−16	6 strokes	(France) Shannon Aubert (Austria) Marina Stütz
2011	Noordwijkse Golf Club	Netherlands	Lisa Maguire	Ireland	293	+5	4 strokes	(Republic of Ireland) Stephanie Meadow
2010	Golf & Spa Resort Kunetickà Hora	Czech Republic	Sophia Popov	Germany	280	−8	3 strokes	(France) Manon Gidali (Denmark) Line Vedel Hansen (Spain) Marta Silva
2009	Falsterbo Golf Club	Sweden	Caroline Hedwall	Sweden	285	+1	10 strokes	(Scotland) Kylie Walker
2008	GC Schloss Schönborn	Austria	Carlota Ciganda	Spain	289		Playoff	(Spain) María Hernández
2007	Le Golf National	France	Caroline Hedwall	Sweden	283		Playoff	(Spain) Carlota Ciganda
2006	Hamburg Falkenstein	Germany	Belén Mozo	Spain	278	−6	2 strokes	(England) Kerry Smith
2005	Santo da Serra Golf Club	Portugal	Jade Schaeffer	France	286		3 strokes	(Spain) Araceli Felgueroso (France) Elena Giraud (Sweden) Anna Nordqvist
2004	Ulzama Golf Club	Spain	Carlota Ciganda	Spain	282		8 strokes	(Spain) María Hernández (Spain) Elisa Serramià
2003	Shannon Golf Club	Ireland	Virginie Beauchet	France	293		2 strokes	(Spain) Adriana Zwanck
2002	Kristianstad Golf Club	Sweden	Becky Brewerton	Wales	288		2 strokes	(Netherlands) Dewi Claire Schreefel
2001	Biella Golf Club	Italy	Martina Eberl	Germany	217 (Note: The 2001 event was reduced to three rounds due to adverse weather conditions.)	−2	4 strokes	(Spain) Nuria Clau
2000	Amber Baltic Golf Club	Poland	Emma Duggleby	England	283	−5	Playoff	(Spain) Tania Elósegui
1999	Karlovy Vary Golf Club	Czech Republic	Sofia Sandolo	Italy	284		2 strokes	(France) Karine Icher
1998	Noordwijk Golf Club	Netherlands	Giulia Sergas	Italy	295	+7	3 strokes	(Italy) Sofia Sandolo
1997	Formby Golf Club	England	Silvia Cavalleri	Italy	297	+9	4 strokes	(France) Ludivine Kreutz
1996	Furesoe Golf Club	Denmark	Silvia Cavalleri	Italy	288	+4	1 stroke	(Sweden) Marie Hedberg
1995	Berlin Golf Club	Germany	Maria Hjorth	Sweden	284	−4	1 stroke	(France) Ariane Pascalie
1994	Båstad Golf Club	Sweden	Tina Fischer	Germany	288	−4	1 stroke	(Australia) Terri McKinnon
1993	Torino Golf Club	Italy	Vibeke Stensrud	Norway	277	−11	4 strokes	(Sweden) Linda Ericsson
1992	Estoril Golf Club	Portugal	Joanne Morley	England	284		3 strokes	(Spain) Estefania Knuth
1991	Schönborn Golf Club	Austria	Delphine Bourson	France	294		3 strokes	(Netherlands) Mette Hageman
1990	Zumikon Golf Club	Switzerland	Martina Koch	West Germany	295	+3	1 stroke	(Spain) Amaya Arruti (Spain) Estefania Knuth
1989	No tournament							
1988	Pedreña Golf Club	Spain	Florence Descampe	Belgium	289		Playoff	(France) Delphine Bourson
1987	No tournament							
1986	Morfontaine Golf Club	France	Martina Koch	West Germany	286		2 strokes	(Australia) Louise Briers
