= Vibeke Stensrud =

Norwegian professional golfer

Personal information
- Nationality: Norway
- Born: 29 September 1973 (age 53) Oslo, Norway

Career
- Sport: Golf
- College: San Jose State University
- Turned professional: 1996
- Former tour: Ladies European Tour (joined 1997)

Best results in LPGA major championships
- Chevron Championship: DNP
- Women's PGA C'ship: DNP
- U.S. Women's Open: DNP
- Women's British Open: CUT: 2001, 2002, 2003
- Evian Championship: DNP

Achievements and awards
- Honda Sports Award Finalist: 1994–95

Vibeke Stensrud (born 29 September 1973) is a Norwegian professional golfer. She won the 1993 European Ladies Amateur Championship and played on the Ladies European Tour between 1997 and 2005, with two runner-up finishes.

== Amateur career ==
Stensrud started playing golf at 7 and joined the National Team before she was 15. She won the Norwegian National Golf Championship four times (1990, 1991, 1993 and 1995) and the European Ladies Amateur Championship in 1993. She represented Norway at the Espirito Santo Trophy three times, and the Continent of Europe at the Vagliano Trophy in 1993 and 1995, winning the latter. Stensrud attended San Jose State University on a golf scholarship, and was one of three finalists for the Honda Sports Award in 1994–95.

== Professional career ==
Stensrud turned professional in 1996 and joined the Ladies European Tour in 1997. She finished 58th on the Order of Merit in her rookie season, and 82nd in 1998 after sustaining an injury to her right arm. She played on the 1999 Ladies Asian Golf Tour and finished fourth at the Malaysia Ladies Open and runner-up at the Philippines Ladies Open.

On the 1999 Ladies European Tour she had her first top-10 finish at the Ladies Italian Open, two strokes behind winner Samantha Head. The following year she finished in a tie for third at the Ladies Irish Open and solo second at the Ladies British Masters, two strokes behind Trish Johnson, for a career-high 17th place in the Order of Merit. In 2003 she tied for second together with Trish Johnson at the Open de France Dames, one stroke behind Lynnette Brooky, ending the season ranked 23rd.

In 2005 Stensrud announced her retirement from tour citing persistent injuries.

== Amateur wins (5) ==
- 1990 Norwegian National Golf Championship
- 1991 Norwegian National Golf Championship
- 1993 European Ladies Amateur Championship
- 1993 Norwegian National Golf Championship
- 1995 Norwegian National Golf Championship

== Results in LPGA majors ==
| Tournament | 2001 | 2002 | 2003 |
|---|---|---|---|
| Kraft Nabisco Championship | | | |
| U.S. Women's Open | | | |
| Women's PGA Championship | | | |
| Women's British Open | CUT | CUT | CUT |

Did not play

CUT = missed the half-way cut.
NT = no tournament

== Team appearances ==
Amateur

- European Ladies' Team Championship (representing Norway): 1993, 1995
- Vagliano Trophy: (representing the Continent of Europe): 1993, 1995 (winners)
- Espirito Santo Trophy (representing Norway): 1988, 1990, 1994
