= Air France Madame Open =

Tournament information
- Location: France
- Established: 1997
- Courses: Golf de Biarritz le Phare (1999); New Golf de Deauville (1997–98)
- Tour: Ladies European Tour
- Format: 54-hole Stroke play
- Prize fund: £100,000 (1998–99) £60,000 (1997)
- Final year: 1999

Tournament record score
- Aggregate: 200 Sofia Grönberg-Whitmore (1999)
- To par: −10 as above

Final champion
- (Sweden) Sofia Grönberg-Whitmore

The Air France Madame Open, known in its final installment as Air France Madame Biarritz Open, was a women's professional golf tournament on the Ladies European Tour that took place in France.

== Winners ==
Year	Dates	Venue	Winner	Country	Score	To par	Margin of victory	Runner-up	Note
Air France Madame Biarritz Open
1999	7–9 Oct	Golf de Biarritz le Phare	Sofia Grönberg-Whitmore	Sweden	200	−10	3 strokes	(France) Sandrine Mendiburu	
Air France Madame Open
1998	16–18 Oct	New Golf de Deauville	Patricia Meunier-Lebouc	France	208	−5	1 stroke	(Sweden) Maria Hjorth	
1997	24–26 Oct	New Golf de Deauville	Loraine Lambert	Australia	213	E	2 strokes	(England) Alison Nicholas	
