= 1992 Espirito Santo Trophy =

Tournament information
- Dates: 24–27 September
- Location: Vancouver, British Columbia, Canada; 49°15′39″N 123°06′50″W
- Course: Marine Drive Golf Club
- Organized by: World Amateur Golf Council
- Format: 72 holes stroke play

Statistics
- Par: 72
- Length: 6,144 yards (5,618 m)
- Field: 31 teams 92 players

Champion
- Spain; Macarena Campomanes, Laura Navarro, Estefania Knuth
- 588 (+12)
- Location in Canada Location in British Columbia

The 1992 Espirito Santo Trophy took place 24–27 September at Marine Drive Golf Club in Vancouver, British Columbia, Canada.

It was the 15th women's golf World Amateur Team Championship for the Espirito Santo Trophy. The tournament was a 72-hole stroke play team event with 31 team entries, each with up to three players. The best two scores for each round counted towards the team total.

The Spain team won the Trophy and their second title, beating the combined team of Great Britain & Ireland by one stroke. Great Britain & Ireland earned the silver medal while the New Zealand team took the bronze on third place another eight strokes back.

The individual title went to Annika Sörenstam, Sweden, whose score of one under par, 287, was five strokes ahead of two players, who shared second place.

== Teams ==
31 teams entered the event and 30 of them completed the competition as team Costa Rica only completed three rounds. Each team had three players, except Hong Kong, which only had two.

Country	Players
Argentina	Maria Olivero, Maria Eugenia Noguerol, Beatriz Rosello
Australia	Ericka Jayatilaka, Loraine Lambert, Joanne Mills
Austria	Natascha B. Fink, Nina Mensi-Klarbach, Katharina Poppmeier
Belgium	Aline Van Der Haegen, Lara Tadiotto, Sophie Tornel
Bermuda	Judith Anne Astwood, Madeline Joell, Kim Marshall
Brazil	Lucilla Davis, Caroline Hiemestra, Elisabeth Nickhorn
Canada	Lorie Kane, Mary Ann Lapointe, Marie-Josee Rouleau
China	Yu-chen Huang, Jui-hui Lee, Pay-fen Lien
Colombia	Maria Isabel Baena, Monica Ledes, Natalia Rodriguez
Costa Rica	Urbina De Fry, Sylvia Siemon De Perez, Hilda Steivorth De Von Saalfeld
Denmark	Pernille Carlson Pedersen, Anne Larsson, Annika Östberg
France	Delphine Bourson, Patricia Meunier-Lebouc, Kristel Mourgue d'Algue
Germany	Franca Fehlauer, Anika Heuser, Heidi Klump
Great Britain & Ireland	Joanne Hockley, Catriona Lambert, Joanne Morley
Guatemala	Beatriz de Arenas, Florencia Rolz, Nancy Noguera
Hong Kong	Joann Hardwick, Victoria Scott
Italy	Silvia Cavalleri, Anna Nistri, Caterina Quintarelli
Japan	Yukiyo Haga, Mikako Kanamori, Mayumi Nakajima
Mexico	Erika Diaz, Carol Fernandez, Roxana Lemus
Netherlands	Lara van Engelenburg, Catryn Geleynse, Tita Keman
New Zealand	Lisa Aldrige, Lynnette Brooky, Susan Farron
Peru	Gilda Hawie, Erika Hayashida, Maria Lopez
Philippines	Ruby Chico, Magdalena De Guzman, Jamille Jose
Singapore	Kee Bee Kim, Serene Poh, Elaine Tan
South Africa	Mandy Adamson, Barbara Plant, Gilly Tebbult
South Korea	Oh Yun Kwon, Chae Eun Song, Ah Ram Suh
Spain	Macarena Campomanes, Laura Navarro, Estefania Knuth
Sweden	Linda Ericsson, Maria Hjorth, Annika Sörenstam
Switzerland	Sophie Ducrey, Jackie Orley, Priscilla Moore
United States	Vicki Goetze, Sarah LeBrun Ingram, Carol Semple Thompson
Venezuela	Carolyn Frech, Irene Mezgravis, Karina Reveron

== Results ==
Place	Country	Score	To par
1	Spain	151-144-147-146=588	+12
2	Great Britain & Ireland	145-147-151-146=589	+13
3	New Zealand	149-145-149-154=597	+21
4	Sweden	151-145-154-149=599	+23
T5	France	149-146-148-157=600	+24
T5	United States	152-146-149-153=600	+24
7	Australia	148-149-150-155=602	+26
8	Italy	151-152-145-155=603	+27
9	South Korea	153-149-154-152=608	+32
T10	Canada	157-148-152-155=612	+36
T10	China	153-149-154-156=612	+36
12	Japan	155-157-149-153=614	+38
13	Austria	155-154-150-157=616	+40
14	Argentina	155-153-156-156=620	+44
15	Germany	158-155-158-151=622	+46
T16	Belgium	164-153-155-154=626	+50
T16	Colombia	158-151-158-159=626	+50
18	Netherlands	156-159-156-156=627	+51
19	Switzerland	159-154-156-159=628	+52
20	South Africa	156-156-157-161=630	+54
21	Venezuela	166-152-159-155=632	+56
22	Denmark	164-162-152-155=633	+57
T23	Peru	163-152-163-157=635	+59
T23	Mexico	161-155-161-158=635	+59
25	Philippines	159-166-162-164=651	+75
26	Singapore	166-166-158-165=655	+79
27	Brazil	171-158-162-166=657	+81
28	Bermuda	167-170-160-170=667	+91
29	Guatemala	170-171-163-165=669	+93
30	Hong Kong	169-178-161-167=675	+99
WD	Costa Rica	191-182-171-WD	

== Individual leaders ==
While there was no official leader board for the individual results, the order of individual placements was recognized in the official record book.

Place	Player	Country	Score	To par
1	Annika Sörenstam	Sweden	75-68-74-70=287	−1
T2	Estefania Knuth	Spain	74-73-73-72=292	+4
T2	Catriona Lambert	Great Britain & Ireland	70-73-76-73=292	+4
T4	Vicki Goetze	United States	78-71-76-76=299	+11
T4	Ericka Jayatilaka	Australia	74-73-75-77=299	+11
T6	Delphine Bourson	France	77-76-74-81=300	+12
T6	Chae Eun Song	South Korea	75-74-76-75=300	+12
T8	Lynnette Brooky	New Zealand	74-73-76-78=301	+13
T8	Joanne Morley	Great Britain & Ireland	75-74-75-77=301	+13
T8	Carol Semple Thompson	United States	74-75-75-77=301	+13
