= Dinah Shore Trophy Award =

Award in women's golf

The Dinah Shore Trophy Award is an annual award introduced in 1994 in honor of Dinah Shore that is given to one of the top collegiate female golfers.

The award, which is administered by the LPGA Foundation and presented by the National Golf Coaches Association (NGCA), recognizes a female collegiate golfer who excels in both academics (GPA of at least 3.2 on a 4.0 scale) and athletics – playing in at least 50 percent of the team's scheduled events – while maintaining a 78.00 or less scoring average. The nominees must also demonstrate outstanding leadership skills and community service.

The Dinah Shore Trophy Award is a part of the Dinah Shore Scholarship Fund, a cooperative effort between the LPGA Foundation, the Friends of Golf (FOG), and the Nabisco Dinah Shore, one of the LPGA's four major championships and the largest contributor to the Dinah Shore Scholarship Fund. A donation of $10,000 is given to the women's golf program of the recipient's institution.

== Winners ==
Year	Winner	College
2025	Emma Bunch	New Mexico State University
2024	Celina Sattelkau	Vanderbilt University
2023	Ami Gianchandani	Yale University
2022	Aline Krauter	Stanford University
2021	Ivana Shah	University of Akron
2020	Renate Grimstad	University of Miami
2019	Kaylee Benton	University of Arkansas
2018	Alice Chen	Furman University
2017	Casey Danielson	Stanford University
2016	Jackie Chulya	Columbia
2015	Katie Kirk	East Carolina
2014	Emily Tubert	Arkansas
2013	Caroline Powers	Michigan State
2012	Amy Anderson	North Dakota State
2011	Pia Halbig	California
2010	Katie Detlefsen	Central Florida
2009	Amanda Blumenherst	Duke
2008	Amanda Blumenherst	Duke
2007	Stacy Lewis	Arkansas
2006	Erica Battle	South Carolina
2005	Karin Sjödin	Oklahoma State
2004	Adrienne Gautreaux	South Carolina
2003	Katherine Hull	Pepperdine
2002	Meredith Duncan	Louisiana State
2001	Melanie Hagewood	Baylor
2000	Lisette Lee	Louisiana State
1999	Mallory Crosland	Vanderbilt
1998	Riko Higashio	Florida
1997	Kellee Booth	Arizona State
1996	Marcie Clemens	Auburn
1995	Stephanie Neil	Wake Forest

== See also ==
- List of sports awards honoring women
