= Loraine Lambert =

Australian professional golfer (born 1972)

Personal information
- Nationality: Australia
- Born: 18 August 1972 (age 54)

Career
- Sport: Golf
- Turned professional: 1994
- Former tours: Ladies European Tour (joined 1994); LPGA Tour (joined 1999); ALPG Tour (1991–2009)
- Professional wins: 8

Number of wins by tour
- Ladies European Tour: 1
- WPGA Tour of Australasia: 7

Best results in LPGA major championships
- Chevron Championship: DNP
- Women's PGA C'ship: CUT: 2003
- U.S. Women's Open: T56: 2004
- Women's British Open: DNP

Loraine Lambert (born 18 August 1972) is a retired Australian professional golfer who played on the Ladies European Tour and the LPGA Tour. She won the Air France Madame Open in 1997.

== Career ==
Lambert was a top amateur in Queensland, competing alongside Karrie Webb and Rachel Hetherington. She won successive New Zealand Ladies Amateur titles in 1991 and 1992. When attempting to win for the third successive year, she was beaten in the final by home player Lynn Brooky.

She represented Australia at the 1992 Espirito Santo Trophy together with Ericka Jayatilaka and Joanne Mills, finishing 7th.

== Professional career ==
Lambert turned professional in 1994 and joined the LET mid-way through the season. Her first event was the Evian Masters, where she finished T10. She was runner-up at the 1996 WPGA Championship of Europe at Gleneagles in Scotland, one stroke behind Tina Fischer. In 1997, she won her maiden international title, the Air France Madame Open, two strokes ahead of Alison Nicholas of England.

On the 1998 Ladies Asian Golf Tour, she finished third at the Toyota Philippines Ladies Open and was runner-up at the Malaysia JAL Ladies Open, one stroke behind Sandrine Mendiburu, and at the Indonesia Ladies Open, behind Tina Fischer.

Lambert first joined the LPGA Tour with conditional status in 1999 but had limited success. In 2002, she played mainly on the Futures Tour, with a best finish of T5 at the Greater Lima Futures Open. She earned fully exempt status by finishing 17th at the LPGA Final Qualifying Tournament in late 2002, and played full time on the LPGA Tour in 2003 and 2004. Her best finish in 2003 was T12 at the Giant Eagle LPGA Classic, and in 2004 she made the cut at the U.S. Women's Open.

She retired from international touring after the 2004 season, playing local ALPG Tour events until 2009. She collected a total of seven titles on the ALPG Tour between 1994 and 2005.

== Amateur wins ==
- 1991 New Zealand Ladies Amateur
- 1992 New Zealand Ladies Amateur, Australian Girls' Amateur

== Professional wins (8) ==
=== Ladies European Tour (1) ===
No.	Date	Tournament	Winning score	To par	Margin of victory	Runner-up
1	26 Oct 1997	Air France Madame Open	71-73-69=213	E	2 strokes	(England) Alison Nicholas

=== ALPG Tour (7) ===
- 1994 (2) Bruce Lynton Bmw Pro-Am, Nudgee Golf Club Pro-Am
- 1988 (1) Betta Electrical Bega Ladies Classic
- 2000 (1) Bermagui Country Club Ladies Pro-Am
- 2003 (1) Aristocrat Sapphire Coast Ladies Golf Classic
- 2005 (2) Jack Newton Celebrity Classic, Moss Vale Golf Club Pro-Am

== Team appearances ==
Amateur

- Espirito Santo Trophy (representing Australia): 1992
- Tasman Cup (representing Australia): 1993 (winners)
- Queen Sirikit Cup (representing Australia): 1992
