= Norwegian National Golf Championship =

Golf tournament in Norway

Norwegian champion Kongepokal

The Norwegian National Golf Championship (Norgesmesterskapet) is an annual golf tournament, played at various locations throughout Norway. It is organized by the Norwegian Golf Federation and was first played in 1956. The championship has been played as a 72-hole stroke-play event since 1968. Previously it was played as a match-play tournament.

Since 1970 (men) and 1976 (women) the winner receives the Kongepokal, the King's Trophy, from Norwegian Olympic and Paralympic Committee and Confederation of Sports in recognition of their status as Norwegian champion.

Currently, the tournament is open to both amateur and professional golfers, Norwegian citizens as well as foreign residents of Norway provided, they have resided in Norway for a minimum period of one year prior to tournament start.

== Winners ==
Year	Venue	Women's champion	Affiliation	Men's champion	Affiliation
2025	Oslo	Silje Torvund Ohma (a)	Fana	Michael Mjaaseth (a) (2/2)	Oslo
2024	Oslo	Renate Grimstad	Stavanger	Mikkel Antonsen (2/2)	Gamle Fredrikstad
2023	Bjaavann	Dorthea Forbrigd	Oslo	Mats Ege (a)	Stavanger
2022	Gamle Fredrikstad	Vilde Marie Nystrøm (a)	Stavanger	Michael Mjaaseth (a) (1/2)	Oslo
2021	Miklagard	Julie Boysen Hillestad	Miklagard	Andreas Halvorsen	Larvik
2020	Holtsmark	Celine Borge	Vestfold	Kristian Krogh	Drammen
2019	Losby	Dorthea Forbrigd	Oslo	Kevin André Wright	Miklagard
2018	Sola	Karoline Stormo	Arendal og omegn	Markus Braadlie	Miklagard
2017	Atlungstad	Karoline Lund	Losby	Mikkel Antonsen (a) (1/2)	Drøbak
2016	Skjeberg	Tonje Daffinrud	Vestfold	Ole Berge Ramsnes	Stavanger
2015	Borre	Marthe Wold	Stavanger	Aksel Kristoffer Olsen	Stavanger
2014	Tyrifjord	Mariell Bruun	Larvik	Viktor Hovland	Drøbak
2013	Stiklestad	Cesilie Hagen	Drammen	Elias Bertheussen (2/2)	Trondheim
2012	Oslo	Marita Engzelius (3/3)	Oslo	Elias Bertheussen (1/2)	Trondheim
2011	Bjaavann	Solveig Helgesen	Bjørnefjorden	Andreas Gjesteby	Drammen
2010	Byneset	Marita Engzelius (2/3)	Oslo	Espen Kofstad (2/2)	Losby
2009	Meland	Rachel Raastad	Kjekstad	Knut Børsheim	Fana
2008	Vestfold	Lene Krog (2/2)	Drammen	Espen Kofstad (1/2)	Losby
2007	Onsøy	Marita Engzelius (1/3)	Oslo	Lars Petter Brovold	Onsøy
2006	Stavanger	Monica Gundersrud (2/2)	Elverum	André Thorsen	Sola
2005	Sorknes	Monica Gundersrud (1/2)	Elverum	Øyvind Rojahn (2/2)	Moss & Rygge
2004	Losby	June Bolme	Losby	Eirik Tage Johansen (3/3)	Stavanger
2003	Sola	Lene Krog (1/2)	Drammen	Eirik Tage Johansen (2/3)	Stavanger
2002	Arendal	Camilla Guriby Hilland	Bærum	Torstein Nævestad	Oslo
2001	Hauger	Ingrid Martens	Sorknes	Eirik Tage Johansen (1/3)	Stavanger
2000	Grenland	Suzann Pettersen (5/5)	Oslo	Jan-Are Larsen	Borregaard
1999	Oslo	Suzann Pettersen (4/5)	Oslo	Peter Kaensche	Hauger
1998	Larvik	Suzann Pettersen (3/5)	Oslo	Kristian Svalheim (2/2)	Kristiansand
1997	Stavanger	Suzann Pettersen (2/5)	Oslo	Morten Hæraas	Kristiansand
1996	Borre	Suzann Pettersen (1/5)	Oslo	Henrik Bjørnstad	Oslo
1995	Nes Verk	Vibeke Stensrud (4/4)	Oslo	Knut Ekjord (3/3)	Oslo
1994	Vestfold	Cecilie Lundgreen	Borregaard	Knut Ekjord (2/3)	Oslo
1993	Elverum	Vibeke Stensrud (3/4)	Oslo	Kristian Svalheim (1/2)	Kristiansand
1992	Stavanger	Christine Norvang	Borregaard	Knut Ekjord (1/3)	Oslo
1991	Oslo	Vibeke Stensrud (2/4)	Oslo	Øyvind Rojahn (1/2)	Borregaard
1990	Borre	Vibeke Stensrud (1/4)	Oslo	Bjørn Hage	Bergen
1989	Stavanger	Anna Dønnestad (5/5)	Oslo	Tore Chr. Sviland (4/4)	Stavanger
1988	Oslo	Elizabeth Vinter	Oslo	Thomas Nielsen	Oslo
1987	Vestfold	Elin Malde (2/2)	Stavanger	Tom Edseth	Oslo
1986	Stavanger	Elin Malde (1/2)	Stavanger	Tom Fredriksen (2/2)	Stavanger
1985	Oslo	Anna Dønnestad (4/5)	Oslo	Eric Bjerkholt	Oslo
1984	Vestfold	Anna Dønnestad (3/5)	Oslo	Tom Fredriksen (1/2)	Stavanger
1983	Oslo	Jannicke Nielsen	Oslo	Gard Midtvåge	Borregaard
1982	Stavanger	Anna Dønnestad (2/5)	Oslo	Tore Chr. Sviland (3/4)	Stavanger
1981	Vestfold	Anna Dønnestad (1/5)	Oslo	Ragnvald Risan	Trondheim
1980	Oslo	Lilly Gulliksen (3/3)	Oslo	Tore Chr. Sviland (2/4)	Stavanger
1979	Stavanger	Lilly Gulliksen (2/3)	Oslo	Tore Chr. Sviland (1/4)	Stavanger
1978	Oslo	Mette Reuss (6/6)	Oslo	Erik Dønnestad (3/3)	Oslo
1977	Stavanger	Lilly Gulliksen (1/3)	Oslo	Leif Ramsnes	Stavanger
1976	Oslo	Mette Reuss (5/6)	Oslo	Alexander M. Vik (2/2)	Oslo
1975	Stavanger	Mette Reuss (4/6)	Oslo	Per Berge	Bergen
1974	Oslo	Vivi Marstrand (2/2)	Trondheim	Johan J. Horn (2/2)	Bergen
1973	Stavanger	Mette Rinde (3/6)	Oslo	Alexander M. Vik (1/2)	Oslo
1972	Oslo	Mette Rinde (2/6)	Oslo	Erik Dønnestad (2/3)	Oslo
1971	Stavanger	Mette Rinde (1/6)	Oslo	Svein Knutsen	Stavanger
1970	Trondheim	Bøbban Bjørge (3/3)	Oslo	Yngve Eriksen	Borregaard
1969	Oslo	Bøbban Bjørge (2/3)	Oslo	Per Heidenreich (2/2)	Oslo
1968	Oslo	Bøbban Bjørge (1/3)	Oslo	Per Heidenreich (1/2)	Oslo
1967	Stavanger	Vivi Horn (1/2)	Oslo	Erik Dønnestad (1/3)	Oslo
1966	Vestfold	Anniken Langaard (8/8)	Oslo	Johan J. Horn (1/2)	Bergen
1965	Oslo	Anniken Langaard (7/8)	Oslo	John Johansen (6/6)	Oslo
1964	Stavanger	Anniken Langaard (6/8)	Oslo	Jan Aaseth (2/2)	Oslo
1963	Oslo	Anniken Langaard (5/8)	Oslo	Arve Pedersen (2/2)	Oslo
1962	Stavanger	Anniken Langaard (4/8)	Oslo	John Johansen (5/6)	Oslo
1961	Oslo	Anniken Langaard (3/8)	Oslo	Jan Aaseth (1/2)	Oslo
1960	Bergen	Anniken Langaard (2/8)	Oslo	John Johansen (4/6)	Oslo
1959	Trondheim	Anniken Bruusgaard (1/8)	Oslo	John Johansen (3/6)	Oslo
1958	Oslo	Aasta Wahlstrøm (3/3)	Oslo	Arve Pedersen (1/2)	Oslo
1957		Aasta Wahlstrøm (2/3)	Oslo	John Johansen (2/6)	Oslo
1956	Oslo	Aasta Wahlstrøm (1/3)	Oslo	John Johansen (1/6)	Oslo

== Multiple winners ==
=== Women ===
Winner	Wins
Anniken Langaard (née Bruusgaard)	8
Mette Reuss (née Rinde)	6
Anna Dønnestad	5
Suzann Pettersen	5
Vibeke Stensrud	4
Bøbban Bjørge	3
Marita Engzelius	3
Lilly Gulliksen	3
Aasta Wahlstrøm	3
Monica Gundersrud	2
Lene Krog	2
Elin Malde	2
Vivi Marstrand (née Horn)	2

=== Men ===
Winner	Wins
John Johansen	6
Tore Chr. Sviland	4
Erik Dønnestad	3
Knut Ekjord	3
Eirik Tage Johansen	3
Jan Aaseth	2
Elias Bertheussen	2
Tom Fredriksen	2
Per Heidenreich	2
Johan J. Horn	2
Espen Kofstad	2
Arve Pedersen	2
Øyvind Rojahn	2
Kristian Svalheim	2
Alexander Vik	2
Mikkel Antonsen	2
