= 1991 European Ladies' Team Championship =

Golf competition

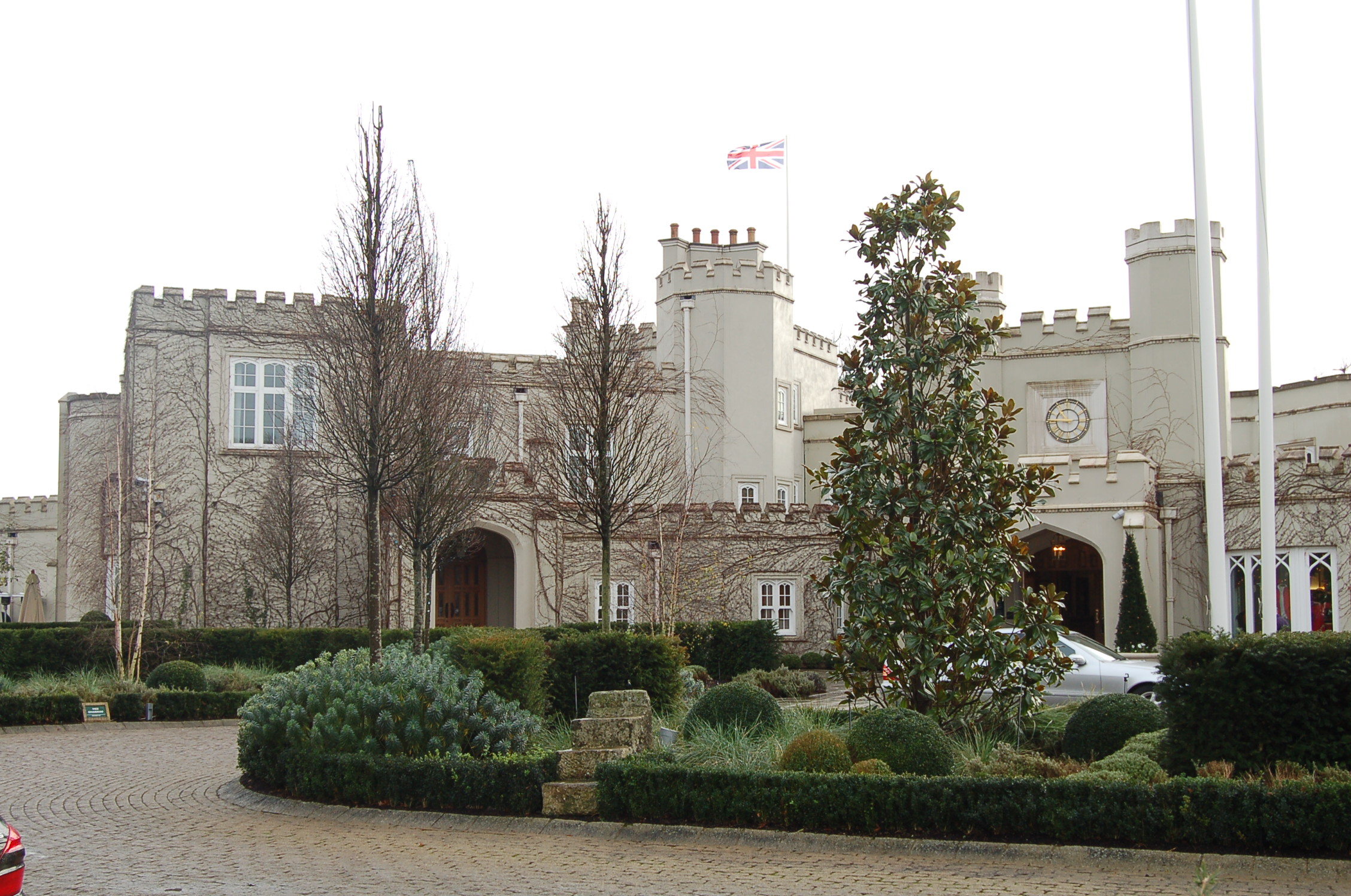
- Clubhouse at Wentworth

Tournament information
- Dates: 10–14 July 1991
- Location: Virginia Water, Surrey, England; 51°23′48″N 0°35′45″W
- Course: Wentworth Club (West Course)
- Organized by: European Golf Association
- Format: 36 holes stroke play Knock-out match-play

Statistics
- Par: 75
- Field: 13 teams 78 players

Champion
- England; Nicola Buxton, Fiona Edmond, Linzi Fletcher, Caroline Hall, Julie Hall, Joanne Morley
- Qualification round: 776 (+26); Final match 5–2

Location map
- Location in Europe Location in the British Isles Location in England Location in Surrey

The 1991 European Ladies' Team Championship took place 10–14 July at Wentworth Club in Virginia Water, Surrey, England, United Kingdom. It was the 17th women's golf amateur European Ladies' Team Championship.

== Venue ==
The hosting Wentworth Club was founded in 1922. Its West Course, situated in Virginia Water, Surrey, 40 kilometres south-west of the city center of London, England, not far from Windsor Castle, opened in 1926 and was designed by golf course architect Harry Colt. It had previously hosted some of the most prestigious tournaments in the world, the 1953 Ryder Cup, the 1956 Canada Cup and several editions of the World Match Play Championship and the BMW PGA Championship.

The championship course was set up with par 75.

== Format ==
All participating teams played two qualification rounds of stroke-play with six players, counted the five best scores for each team.

The eight best teams formed flight A, in knock-out match-play over the next three days. The teams were seeded based on their positions after the stroke-play. The first placed team was drawn to play the quarter-final against the eight placed team, the second against the seventh, the third against the sixth and the fourth against the fifth. In each match between two nation teams, two 18-hole foursome games and five 18-hole single games were played. Teams were allowed to switch players during the team matches, selecting other players in to the afternoon single games after the morning foursome games. Games all square after 18 holes were declared halved, if the team match was already decided.

The five teams placed 9–13 in the qualification stroke-play formed Flight B, to meet each other to decide their final positions.

== Teams ==
13 nation teams contested the event. Each team consisted of six players.

Players in the leading teams

Country	Players
England	Nicola Buxton, Fiona Edmond, Linzi Fletcher, Caroline Hall, Julie Hall, Joanne Morley
Ireland	Eavan Higgins, Claire Hourihane, Denise McCarthy, Eileen Rose McDaid, Mary McKenna
France	Delphine Bourson, Caroline Bourtayre, Valérie Michaud, Cécilia Mourgue d'Algue, Kristel Mourge d'Algue, Valérie Golléty-Pamard
Germany	Susanne Boes, Franca Fehlauer, Martina Fischer, Luise Gehlen, Henriette Gladiator, Anika Heuser
Scotland	Fiona Anderson, Elaine Farquharson, Catriona Lambert, Janice Moodie, Alison Rose, Morag Wright
Sweden	Maria Bertilsköld, Charlotta Eliasson, Åsa Gottmo, Carin Hjalmarsson Koch, Petra Rigby, Annika Sörenstam
Wales	Lisa Dermott, Julie Foster, Helen Lawson, S. Mountford, Andrea Perriam, Vicki Thomas

Other participating teams

Country
Belgium
Denmark
Italy
Netherlands
Spain
Switzerland

== Winners ==
Two-times-champions team Sweden, with 20 years old future professional world number one Annika Sörenstam in the team, won the opening 36-hole qualifying competition, with a score of 18 over par 768, eight strokes ahead of host nation England.

Individual leader in the 36-hole stroke-play competition was Silvia Cavalleri, Italy, with a score of 2-under-par 148, one stroke ahead of Joanne Morley, England.

Team England won the championship. Playing in their tenth final they beat Sweden 5–2 and earned their seventh title. Defending champions France earned third place, beating team Wales in the bronze match.

== Results ==
Qualification round

Team standings

Place	Country	Score	To par
1	Sweden	387-381=768	+18
2	England	388-388=776	+26
3	Scotland	392-391=783	+33
4	Italy	391-395=786	+36
5	France	398-390=788	+38
6	Wales	405-389=794	+44
7	Spain	396-399=795	+45
8	Ireland	402-398=800	+50
9	Germany	405-396=801	+51
10	Denmark	405-406=811	+61
11	Netherlands	415-407=822	+72
12	Switzerland	419-405=824	+74
13	Belgium	424-407=831	+81

Individual leaders

Place	Player	Country	Score	To par
1	Silvia Cavalleri	Italy	71-77=148	−2
2	Joanne Morley	England	74-75=149	−1
3	Vicki Thomas	Wales	78-72=150	E
T4	Maria Bertilsköld	Sweden	75-76=151	+1
T4	Franca Fehlauer	Germany	79-72=151	+1
T4	Valérie Michaud	France	77-74=151	+1
T4	Pernille Carlson Pedersen	Denmark	74-77=151	+1

Note: There was no official award for the lowest individual score.

Flight A

Bracket

Quarter finals
Sweden	5
Ireland	2
France	4.5
Italy	2.5
Wales	5
Scotland	2
England	7
Spain	0

Semi finals
Sweden	4
France	3
England	6
Wales	1

Final
England	5
Sweden	2
Bronze match
France
Wales

Final games

England	Sweden
5	2
F. Edmond / L. Fletcher	M. Bertilsköld / A. Sörenstam 19th hole
N. Buxton / C. Hall 1 hole	Å. Gottmo / C. Hjalmarsson Koch
Nicola Buxton 1 hole	Annika Sörenstam
Julie Hall 1 hole	Carin Hjalmarsson Koch
Joanne Morley	Maria Bertilsköld 4 & 3
Caroline Hall 5 & 3	Petra Rigby
Linzi Fletcher 3 & 2	Åsa Gottmo

Final standings

Place	Country
1st place, gold medalist(s)	England
2nd place, silver medalist(s)	Sweden
3rd place, bronze medalist(s)	France
4	Wales
5	Italy
6	Spain
7	Scotland
8	Ireland
9	Germany
10	Denmark
11	Netherlands
12	Switzerland
13	Belgium

== See also ==
- Espirito Santo Trophy – biennial world amateur team golf championship for women organized by the International Golf Federation.
- European Amateur Team Championship – European amateur team golf championship for men organised by the European Golf Association.
