= Mette Hageman =

Dutch professional golfer

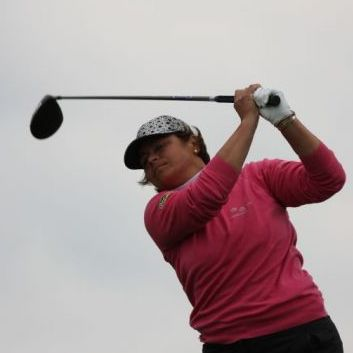

Personal information
- Nationality: Netherlands
- Born: 22 September 1966 (age 60) Dieren, Netherlands

Career
- Sport: Golf
- College: University of Arizona
- Turned professional: 1992
- Former tour: Ladies European Tour (1992–2005)
- Professional wins: 3

Achievements and awards
- First Team All-American: 1990, 1991

Mette Hageman (born 22 September 1966) is a professional golfer from the Netherlands who played on the Ladies European Tour 1992–2005. She was runner up at the 1991 European Ladies Amateur Championship and the 1999 Ladies Italian Open.

== Early life and amateur career ==
Hageman was born 1966 in Dieren in the municipality of Rheden to Mariette Vigeleyn Nikijuluw, a former hockey international, and Hendrik-Jan Hageman, a chemistry professor at Leiden University. She was introduced to golf at the age of 12, and was attached to former Dutch Open venue Rosendaelsche Golf Club.

From 1986 to 1991, Hageman was part of the Dutch National Team. She represented the Netherlands at the Espirito Santo Trophy in 1988 and again in 1990, where she had the 6th lowest individual score. At the 1987 European Ladies' Team Championship, she had the 4th lowest individual score. She was runner up at the 1991 European Ladies Amateur Championship, three strokes behind Delphine Bourson of France.

In 1991, she played for the Continent Europe in the Vagliano Trophy, at Nairn Golf Club in Scotland.

Hageman attended the University of Arizona and played golf on the Arizona Wildcats women's golf team together with Annika Sörenstam. She captured four titles in the Dick McGuire Invitational, Betsy Rawls Invitational, Chris Johnson Women's Invitational and Shisheido Cup, and was a first team All-American in 1990 and 1991.

== Professional career ==
Hageman turned professional in 1992 and joined the Ladies European Tour, where she played until 2005. She recorded 15 top-10 finishes, including a runner-up at the 1999 Ladies Italian Open and third-place finishes at the 1993 European Ladies Classic, the 1995 Danish Ladies Open, and the 1996 and 1999 Open de France Dames.

She served on the board of the Ladies European Tour from 1998 to 2004, initially as President of the Players Council, a period of one year as Interim President of the Ladies European Tour, and for the last three years as President of the Ladies European Tour and Ladies European Tour Enterprises.

Hageman won her first senior title at the 2017 International French Ladies Senior Open, the Trophée Simone Thion de la Chaume.

== Amateur wins ==
- 1986 Dutch National Amateur Strokeplay Championship, Dutch National Amateur Matchplay Championship, International Luxembourg Foursome Championship (with Bauke Built)
- 1988 Dutch National Amateur Strokeplay Championship
- 1989 Dutch National Amateur Strokeplay Championship, Dutch National Amateur Matchplay Championship
- 1990 Dutch National Amateur Strokeplay Championship, Swiss International Ladies Amateur Championship
- 1991 Dutch National Amateur Strokeplay Championship, Swiss International Ladies Amateur Championship

== Professional wins (3) ==
=== Swedish Golf Tour wins (1) ===
No.	Date	Tournament	Winning score	Margin of victory	Runner-up	Ref
1	16 Aug 1991	Stora Lundby Ladies Open (as an amateur)	219 (+3)	2 strokes	(Sweden) Marie Wennersten-From	

=== Other wins (20 ===
- 2006 Glenmuir WPGA Club Professional Championship
- 2017 International French Ladies Senior Open (Trophée Simone Thion de la Chaume)

== Team appearances ==
Amateur

- European Ladies' Team Championship (representing Netherlands): 1987
- Espirito Santo Trophy (representing Netherlands): 1988, 1990
- Vagliano Trophy (representing the Continent of Europe): 1991

Professional

- Women's World Cup of Golf (representing the Netherlands): 2000
