= Silvia Cavalleri =

Italian professional golfer (born 1972)

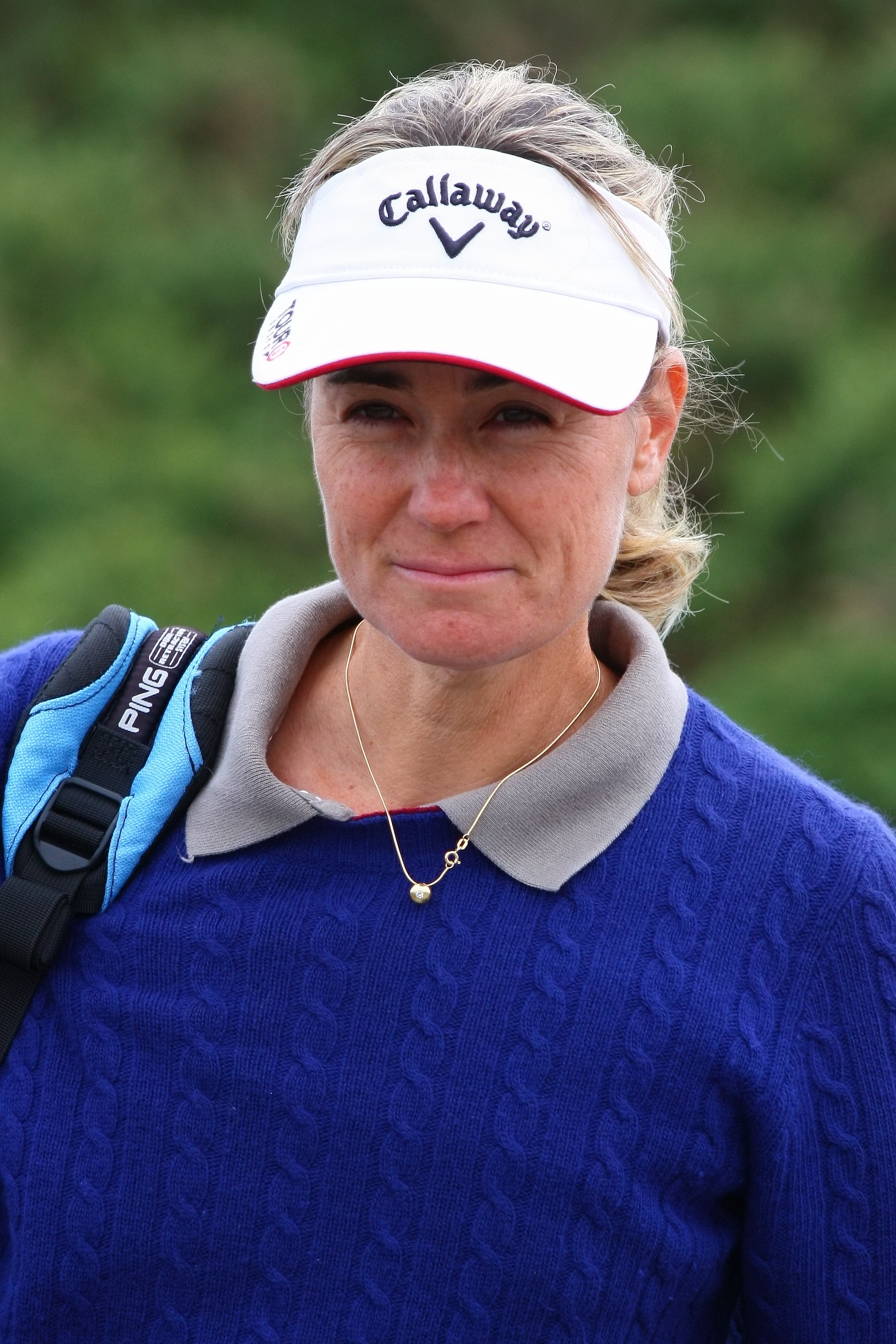
- Cavalleri during 2010 Women's British Open

Personal information
- Nationality: Italy
- Born: 10 October 1972 (age 54) Milan, Italy
- Height: 5 ft 7 in (1.70 m)

Career
- Sport: Golf
- College: Politecnico di Milano
- Turned professional: 1997
- Former tours: Ladies European Tour (joined 1997); LPGA Tour (1999–2014)
- Professional wins: 2

Number of wins by tour
- LPGA Tour: 1
- Ladies European Tour: 1

Best results in LPGA major championships
- Chevron Championship: T51: 2008
- Women's PGA C'ship: T16: 2006
- U.S. Women's Open: T27: 2000
- du Maurier Classic: DNP
- Women's British Open: T25: 2001
- Evian Championship: DNP
Medal record
Mediterranean Games
Gold medal – first place	1997 Bari	Women's team
Bronze medal – third place	1997 Bari	Individual

Silvia Cavalleri (born 10 October 1972) is an Italian professional golfer who played on the U.S.-based LPGA Tour and Ladies European Tour. She was the first Italian to win a tournament on the LPGA Tour.

== Early life and amateur career ==
In 1972, Cavalleri was born in Milan, Italy. She won the 1990 Girls Amateur Championship and represented Europe in the Vagliano Trophy five times between 1989 and 1997. She represented Italy in the Espirito Santo Trophy World Amateur Team Championship in 1992 and 1996, was the 1996 World Amateur individual champion, and the 1997 U.S. Women's Amateur champion. She won the European Ladies Amateur Championship in 1996 and 1997.

She graduated from Politecnico di Milano university in 1998 with a degree in architecture.

== Professional career ==
In 1997, Cavalleri turned professional. She played in 1998 on the Ladies European Tour. She joined the LPGA Tour in 1999. She won her first professional tournament in 2007 at the Corona Championship, becoming the first Italian to win an LPGA tournament.

== Professional wins (2) ==
=== LPGA Tour wins (1) ===
No.	Date	Tournament	Winning score	Margin of victory	Runners-up
1	29 Apr 2007	Corona Championship	−20 (69-68-69-66=272)	2 strokes	(Paraguay) Julieta Granada (Mexico) Lorena Ochoa

=== Ladies European Tour wins (1) ===
- 1999 Royal Marie-Claire Open

== Results in LPGA majors ==
Results not in chronological order before 2014.

Tournament	1999	2000	2001	2002	2003	2004	2005	2006	2007	2008	2009	2010	2011	2012	2013	2014
Kraft Nabisco Championship					CUT			CUT	CUT	T51	70	CUT	CUT	CUT		
U.S. Women's Open		T27				CUT	CUT	T57	WD	CUT			CUT			
Women's British Open			T25	CUT	T64	CUT	CUT	T45	CUT			CUT	CUT			
LPGA Championship			CUT	T22	CUT		CUT	T16	T62	T58	CUT	T62	T75		CUT	CUT
The Evian Championship ^																

Note: The Women's British Open replaced the du Maurier Classic as an LPGA major in 2001.
^ The Evian Championship was added as a major in 2013.

Did not play

CUT = missed the half-way cut
WD = withdrew
"T" = tied

=== Summary ===
Tournament	Wins	2nd	3rd	Top-5	Top-10	Top-25	Events	Cuts made
Kraft Nabisco Championship	0	0	0	0	0	0	8	2
LPGA Championship	0	0	0	0	0	2	12	6
U.S. Women's Open	0	0	0	0	0	0	7	2
The Evian Championship	0	0	0	0	0	0	0	0
Women's British Open	0	0	0	0	0	1	9	3
Totals	0	0	0	0	0	3	36	13

== Team appearances ==
Amateur

- European Ladies' Team Championship (representing Italy): 1989, 1991, 1993, 1995, 1997
- Espirito Santo Trophy (representing Italy): 1992, 1996

Professional

- World Cup (representing Italy): 2006, 2008
