= 1993 European Ladies' Team Championship =

Golf competition

Tournament information
- Dates: 7–11 July 1993
- Location: The Hague, Netherlands; 52°07′52″N 04°21′43″E
- Course: Royal The Hague Golf & Country Club
- Organized by: European Golf Association
- Format: 36 holes stroke play Knock-out match-play

Statistics
- Par: 72
- Field: 16 teams 96 players

Champion
- England; Sarah Burnell, Nicola Buxton, Julie Hall, Joanne Morley, Kirsty Speak, Lisa Walton
- Qualification round: 750 (+30); Final match 4 1/2–2 1/2

Location map
- Location in Europe Location in the Netherlands

The 1993 European Ladies' Team Championship took place 7–11 July at Royal The Hague Golf & Country Club in Wassenaar, Netherlands. It was the 18th women's golf amateur European Ladies' Team Championship.

== Venue ==
The course, situated in an undulating dune landscape in Wassenaar, 10 kilometres north of the city center of The Hague, Netherlands, was designed in 1938, by Harry Colt and C.H. Alison.

The championship course was set up with par 72.

== Format ==
All participating teams played two qualification rounds of stroke-play with six players, counted the five best scores for each team.

The eight best teams formed flight A, in knock-out match-play over the next three days. The teams were seeded based on their positions after the stroke-play. The first placed team was drawn to play the quarter-final against the eight placed team, the second against the seventh, the third against the sixth and the fourth against the fifth. In each match between two nation teams, two 18-hole foursome games and five 18-hole single games were played. Teams were allowed to switch players during the team matches, selecting other players in to the afternoon single games after the morning foursome games. Games all square after 18 holes were declared halved, if the team match was already decided.

The eight teams placed 9–16 in the qualification stroke-play formed Flight B, to play similar knock-out match-play to decide their final positions.

== Teams ==
16 nation teams contested the event. Each team consisted of six players.

Players in the teams

Country	Players
Austria	Maria-Theresa Elsner, Natascha Fink, Lilian Mensi, Katharina Poppmeier, Nadine Rass, Antonia Reichel
Belgium	Isabelle Declerque, Lana Freund, Sophie Leten, Catherine Pons, Lara Tadiotto, Sophie Tornel
Denmark	Pernille Carlson Pedersen, Anne Larsson, Iben Tinning, Camilla Faaborg-Andersen, Lotte Greve, Christina Kuld
England	Sarah Burnell, Nicola Buxton, Julie Hall, Joanne Morley, Kirsty Speak, Lisa Walton
France	Delphine Bourson, Benjamine Cherien, Stéphanie Dallon Geville, Sophie Louapre-Pfeiffer, Patricia Meunier, Kristel Mourge d'Algue
Germany	Martina Fischer, Heidi Klump, Anika Heuser, Claudia von Grundherr, Henriette Gladiator, Annette Jansen
Iceland	Olof Maria Jonsdottir, Ragnhildur Sigurdadottir, Herborg Arnarsdottir, Thordis Geirsdottir, Karen Saevarsdottir, Svala Oskarsdottir
Ireland	Tracy Eakin, Eavan Higgins, Denise McCarthy, Eileen Rose McDaid Power, Aideen Rogers, Ada O'Sullivan
Italy	Caterina Quintarelli, Silvia Cavalleri, Alessandra Salvi, Marina Buscaini, Maria Paola Casati, Giuliana Colavito
Netherlands	Francine Bolwidt, Laura van Engelenburg, Catryn Geleynse, Laura Thijssen, Dagmar de Vries, Marike Zelsman
Norway	Elisabeth Eide, Tine Faanes, Cecilie Lundgreen, Gro Nilsen, Christene Norvang, Vibeke Stensrud
Scotland	Catriona Lambert, Fiona, McKay, Mhairi McKay, Myra McKinley, Janice Moodie, Alison Rose
Spain	Marina Arruti, Macarena Campomanes, Estefania Knuth, Laura Navarro, Maria José Pons, Vanessa Vignali
Sweden	Linda Ericsson, Sofie Eriksson, Maria Hjorth, Anna-Carin Jonasson, Pernilla Sterner, Charlotta Sörenstam
Switzerland	Sophie Ducrey, Sheila Lee, Nathalie Milocchi, Lisa Schaufelberger, Sandra Storjohann, Carlotta Vannini
Wales	Lisa Dermott, Andrea Donne, Julie Foster, Bethan Jones, Helen Lawson, Vicki Thomas

== Winners ==
Two-times-champions team Sweden won the opening 36-hole qualifying competition, with a score of 19 over par 739, five strokes ahead of team France. This was the fourth time in a row Sweden won the stroke-play competition.

Tied individual leaders in the 36-hole stroke-play competition was Delphine Bourson, France, Julie Hall (nee Wade), England, Anna-Carin Jonasson, Sweden, and Catriona Lambert (later named Matthew), Scotland, each with a score of even par 144, one stroke ahead of nearest competitor.

Team England won the championship. Playing in their eleventh final they beat Spain 4 1/2–2 1/2 and earned their eighth title. Team France earned third place, beating Sweden 4–3 in the bronze match.

== Results ==
Qualification round

Team standings

Place	Country	Score	To par
1	Sweden	374-365=739	+19
2	France	369-375=744	+24
3	Spain	375-371=746	+26
4	England	375-375=750	+30
5	Ireland	372-382=754	+34
6	Italy	382-374=756	+36
7	Scotland	372-385=757	+37
8	Wales	381-392=773	+53
9	Denmark	387-388=775	+55
10	Germany	385-394=779	+59
11	Belgium	394-391=785	+65
12	Netherlands	383-403=786	+66
13	Switzerland	394-402=796	+76
T14	Austria *	407-393=800	+80
T14	Norway	404-396=800	+80
16	Iceland	401-406=807	+87

* Note: In the event of a tie the order was determined by the better total non-counting scores.

Individual leaders

Place	Player	Country	Score	To par
T1	Delphine Bourson	France	68-76=144	E
T1	Julie Hall	England	73-71=144	E
T1	Anna-Carin Jonasson	Sweden	73-71=144	E
T1	Catriona Lambert	Scotland	73-71=144	E
5	Laura Navarro	Spain	75-70=145	+1
T6	Joanne Morley	England	73-73=146	+2
T6	María José Pons	Spain	73-73=146	+2
T6	Eileen Rose McDaid	Ireland	71-75=146	+2
T6	Charlotta Sörenstam	Sweden	75-71=146	+2
T10	Silvia Cavalleri	Italy	77-70=147	+3
T10	Stéfanie Dallon Geville	France	74-73=147	+3

Note: There was no official award for the lowest individual score.

Flight A

Bracket

Quarter finals
France	4
Scotland	3
Spain	4.5
Italy	2.5
England	5
Ireland	2
Sweden	4.5
Wales	2.5

Semi finals
Spain	4.5
France	2.5
England	4
Sweden	3

Final
England	4.5
Spain	2.5
Bronze match
France	4
Sweden	3

Elimination matches
Scotland	4
Italy	3
Ireland	4.5
Wales	2.5

Match for 5th place
Scotland	4
Ireland	3
Match for 7th place
Italy	4
Wales	3

Final games

England	Spain
4.5	2.5
N. Buxton / J. Morley 19th hole	M. Campomanes / E. Knuth
J. Hall / L. Walton 3 & 2	L. Navarro / M.J. Pons
Nicola Buxton 3 & 2	Maria José Pons
Julie Hall 5 & 4	Laura Navarro
Kirsty Speak	Macarena Campomanes 4 & 3
Joanne Morley	Estefania Knuth 3 & 2
Lisa Walton AS *	Vanessa Vignali AS *

* Note: Game all square after 18 holes declared halved, since team match already decided.

Flight B

Bracket

Round 1
West Germany	6
Norway	1
Belgium	4
Austria	3
Switzerland	5.5
Netherlands	1.5
Denmark	7
Iceland	0

Round 2
West Germany	5
Belgium	2
Denmark	4
Switzerland	3

Match for 9th place
Denmark	6
West Germany	1
Match for 11th place
Switzerland	4
Belgium	3

Elimination matches
Austria	4
Norway	3
Netherlands	4
Iceland	3

Match for 13th place
Netherlands	4
Austria	3
Match for 15th place
Iceland	4
Norway	3

Final standings

Place	Country
1st place, gold medalist(s)	England
2nd place, silver medalist(s)	Spain
3rd place, bronze medalist(s)	France
4	Sweden
5	Scotland
6	Ireland
7	Italy
8	Wales
9	Denmark
10	Germany
11	Switzerland
12	Belgium
13	Netherlands
14	Austria
15	Iceland
16	Norway

== See also ==
- Espirito Santo Trophy – biennial world amateur team golf championship for women organized by the International Golf Federation.
- European Amateur Team Championship – European amateur team golf championship for men organised by the European Golf Association.
