= 1987 Swedish Golf Tour (women) =

Second season of the Swedish Golf Tour (women)

1987 Swedish Golf Tour (women) season
- Duration: May 1987 – September 1987
- Number of official events: 9
- Most wins: 2: (Sweden) Marie Wennersten
- Order of Merit winner: (Sweden) Maria Lindbladh

The 1987 Swedish Golf Tour was the second season of the Swedish Golf Tour, a series of professional golf tournaments for women held in Sweden.

The tournament Director for the second year was Ulf Jacobsson, and the player representative was Liv Wollin. Tournaments were played over 54 holes with no cuts, and the SI and LET events were over 72 holes with cuts.

== Schedule ==
The season consisted of 9 events played between May and September. The tour planned to continue Kristianstad Ladies Open and Aspeboda Ladies Open as Ladies European Tour events and added the European Masters, slated to be the richest LET event of the season with a purse of 1,100,000, but ultimately withdrew all three from the LET.

Date	Tournament	Location	Winner	Score	Margin of victory	Runner(s)-up	Purse (SEK)	Note	Ref
24 May	Höganäs Ladies Open	Mölle Golf Club	(Sweden) Marie Wennersten	217	9 strokes	(Sweden) Pia Nilsson	50,000		
28 Jun	IBM Ladies Open	Bokskogen Golf Club	(Sweden) Pia Nilsson	215	15 strokes	(Sweden) Liv Wollin	50,000		
4 Jul	SI Trygg-Hansa Open	Drottningholm Golf Club	(Japan) Michiko Hattori	284	5 strokes	(Sweden) Helene Koch	50,000		
19 Jul	Delsjö Ladies Open	Delsjö Golf Club	(Sweden) Maria Lindbladh	145	3 strokes	(Sweden) Anna Oxenstierna	50,000		
26 Jul	SM Match Trygg-Hansa Cup	Linköping Golf Club	(Sweden) Helen Alfredsson			(Sweden) Cecilia Lundin	80,000		
16 Aug	Kristianstad Ladies Open	Kristianstad Golf Club	Tournament cancelled (Note: Tournament cancelled)				500,000	LET event	
23 Aug	Aspeboda Ladies Open	Falun-Borlänge	(Sweden) Marie Wennersten	221	3 strokes	(Sweden) Helena Brobeck	~~500,000~~; 50,000	~~LET event~~ (Note: Tournament removed from LET schedule)	
30 Aug	European Masters	Borås	Tournament cancelled				1,100,000	LET event	
13 Sep	Stora Lundby Ladies Open	Stora Lundby	(Norway) Cathrine Schröder	230	Playoff	(Sweden) Elisabet Johanson (Sweden) Marie Wennersten	50,000		

National Championship tournaments

== Order of Merit ==
Rank	Player	Score
1	(Sweden) Maria Lindbladh	37,500
2	(Sweden) Marie Wennersten	32,000
3	(Sweden) Anna Oxenstierna	31,666

== See also ==
- 1987 Swedish Golf Tour (men's tour)
