= Estefania Knuth =

Spanish professional golfer (born 1973)

Personal information
- Full name: Estefania Elena Knuth Marten
- Nationality: Spain
- Born: 4 May 1973 (age 53) Barcelona, Spain

Career
- Sport: Golf
- Turned professional: 1993
- Former tour: Ladies European Tour
- Professional wins: 1
Medal record
Mediterranean Games
Gold medal – first place	1993 Languedoc-Roussillon	Individual
Gold medal – first place	1993 Languedoc-Roussillon	Women's team

Estefania Knuth (born 4 May 1973) is a Spanish professional golfer and former member of the Ladies European Tour. She won the 1992 Espirito Santo Trophy and the 1995 Singapore Ladies Open.

== Career ==
Knuth was born in Barcelona and had a successful amateur career. She won the 1989 Junior Orange Bowl in Florida and was runner-up at the European Ladies Amateur championship in 1990 and 1993. She won the French International Lady Juniors Amateur Championship twice, and won the 1992 French Ladies Amateur ahead of compatriot Laura Navarro.

Knuth won the 1992 Espirito Santo Trophy in Vancouver, Canada together with Macarena Campomanes and Laura Navarro, and won gold at the 1993 Mediterranean Games in France both individually and in the team event together with Marina Arruti and Navarro.

Knuth turned professional 1993 and joined the Ladies European Tour. Her best finish was a tie for third at the 1998 Austrian Ladies Open, two strokes behind Lynnette Brooky of New Zealand.

In 1995, she won the Singapore Ladies Open on the Ladies Asian Golf Tour.

== Amateur wins ==
- 1989 Junior Orange Bowl
- 1990 French International Lady Juniors Amateur Championship
- 1992 French International Lady Juniors Amateur Championship, French Ladies Amateur
- 1993 Mediterranean Games (individual)

== Professional wins (1) ==
=== Ladies Asian Golf Tour wins (1) ===
- 1995 Singapore Ladies Open

== Team appearances ==
Amateur

- European Lady Junior's Team Championship (representing Spain): 1992 (winners)
- European Ladies' Team Championship (representing Spain): 1993
- Vagliano Trophy (representing the Continent of Europe): 1993
- Espirito Santo Trophy: (representing Spain): 1990, 1992 (winners)
