= Virginie Beauchet =

French professional golfer

Personal information
- Nationality: France
- Born: Aix-les-Bains, France

Career
- Sport: Golf
- Turned professional: 2003
- Former tour: Ladies European Tour (joined 2004)

Best results in LPGA major championships
- Chevron Championship: DNP
- Women's PGA C'ship: DNP
- U.S. Women's Open: DNP
- Women's British Open: CUT: 2004

Virginie Beauchet is a French professional golfer and former Ladies European Tour player. She won the 2003 European Ladies Amateur Championship

== Career ==
Beauchet had a successfual amateur career and won the 2002 Biarritz Cup and the 2002 Championnat de France Amateur Dames, winning the final at Le Golf National against Gwladys Nocera by 8 and 7.

She won the 2003 European Ladies Amateur Championship at Shannon Golf Club in Ireland, two strokes ahead of Adriana Zwanck of Spain.

Beauchet finished tied 9th at LET Q-School in late 2003 to earn a card for the 2004 Ladies European Tour and turned professional. In her rookie LET season, she finished solo 4th at the BMW Ladies Italian Open, five strokes behind winner Ana Belén Sánchez.

== Amateur wins ==
- 2002 Championnat de France Amateur Dames, Biarritz Cup
- 2003 European Ladies Amateur Championship

== Results in LPGA majors ==
Played only in the Women's British Open.

Tournament	2004
Women's British Open	CUT

CUT = missed the half-way cut
