= Pia Andersson =

Swedish bridge player

Pia Andersson is a Swedish European champion bridge player.

== Bridge accomplishments ==
=== Wins ===
- European Women Teams Championship: 2004
- European Mixed Pairs Champions 1998
