= 1989 European Ladies' Team Championship =

Golf competition

Tournament information
- Dates: 5–9 July 1989
- Location: Girona, Catalonia, Spain; 41°59′40″N 03°11′32″E
- Course: Golf de Pals
- Organized by: European Golf Association
- Format: 36 holes stroke play Knock-out match-play

Statistics
- Par: 73
- Field: 16 teams 96 players

Champion
- France; Delphine Bourson, Caroline Bourtayre, Sophie Louapre, Cécilia Mourgue d'Algue, Sandrine Mendiburu, Valérie Golléty-Pamard
- Qualification round: 755 (+25); Final match 4–3

Location map
- Location in Europe Location in Spain Location in Catalonia Location in Province of Girona

The 1989 European Ladies' Team Championship took place 5–9 July at Golf de Pals in Girona, Catalonia, Spain. It was the 16th women's golf amateur European Ladies' Team Championship.

== Venue ==
The hosting course, situated in northern Spain, outside Girona, in the coastal region Costa Brava, Catalonia, 80 kilometres (50 miles) north of Barcelona, saw its first holes inaugurated in 1966. It was extended to 18 holes, designed by golf course architect Fred W. Hawtree, in 1970. Two years later the course hosted the 1972 Spanish Open, the very first tournament of the first official season of the European Tour.

The championship course was set up with par 73.

== Format ==
All participating teams played two qualification rounds of stroke-play with six players, counted the five best scores for each team.

The eight best teams formed flight A, in knock-out match-play over the next three days. The teams were seeded based on their positions after the stroke-play. The first placed team was drawn to play the quarter-final against the eight placed team, the second against the seventh, the third against the sixth and the fourth against the fifth. In each match between two nation teams, two 18-hole foursome games and five 18-hole single games were played. Teams were allowed to switch players during the team matches, selecting other players in to the afternoon single games after the morning foursome games. Games all square after 18 holes were declared halved, if the team match was already decided.

The eight teams placed 9–16 in the qualification stroke-play formed Flight B, to play similar knock-out play to decide their final positions.

== Teams ==
16 nation teams contested the event. Each team consisted of six players.

Players in the leading teams

| Country | Players |
|---|---|
| Denmark | Pernille Carlson Pedersen, Lise Eliasen, Anne Larsson, Karina Ørum, Annika Østberg |
| England | Linda Bayman, Janet Collingham, Helen Dobson, Lora Fairclough, Julie Hall, Simone Morgan |
| Ireland | L. Bolton, Eavan Higgins, Claire Hourihane, Eileen Rose McDaid, Mary McKenna, Carol Wickham |
| Italy | Silvia Cavalleri, Anna Nistri, Isabella Calogero, Stefania Croce, Caterina Quintarelli, Alessandra Salvi |
| France | Delphine Bourson, Caroline Bourtayre, Sophie Louapre, Cécilia Mourgue d'Algue, Sandrine Mendiburu, Valérie Golléty-Pamard |
| Scotland | Lindsey Anderson, Elaine Farquharson, Julie Forbes, Kathryn Imrie, Shirley Lawson Huggan, Catriona Lambert |
| Spain | Lourdes Barbieto, Macarena Campomanes, Sonia Navarro, Maria Orueta, Esther Valera |
| Sweden | Margareta Bjurö, Carin Hjalmarsson Koch, Madeleine Kvist, Malin Landehag, Katarina Michols, Pernilla Sterner |
| Wales | Lisa Dermott, Julie Foster, Helen Lawson, Sharon Roberts, Vicki Thomas, Helen Wadsworth |
| West Germany | Ursula Beer, Martina Fischer, Luise Gehlen, Claudia von Grundherr, Martina Koch, Petra Sporner |

Other participating teams

Country
Austria
Belgium
Finland
Netherlands
Norway
Switzerland

== Winners ==
Four-time-winners team France and six-time-winners team England tied the lead at the opening 36-hole qualifying competition, each with a score of 25 over par 755, with England winning by the tie-breaking better total non-counting scores.

Individual leader in the 36-hole stroke-play competition was Macarena Campomanes, Spain with a score of 1-under-par 145, three strokes ahead of three players at tied second.

Team France won the gold, earning their fifth title and first since 1975, beating England in the final 4–3. The championship was decided when Cécilia Mourgue d'Algue, playing captain for team France, beat Helen Dobson, England, on the 19th hole. Mourgue d'Algue represented Sweden in the championship in 1965 and 1967 and in 1989, at age 42, made her fifth appearance representing France, being on the winning team for the first time.

Team Italy earned third place, beating Scotland in the bronze match.

== Results ==
Qualification round

Team standings

| Place | Country | Score | To par |
|---|---|---|---|
| T1 | France * | 378-377=755 | +25 |
| T1 | England | 377-378=755 | +25 |
| 3 | Scotland | 384-380=764 | +34 |
| 4 | Italy | 379-387=766 | +36 |
| 5 | West Germany | 389-382=771 | +41 |
| 6 | Spain | 388-386=774 | +44 |
| 7 | Denmark | 390-390=780 | +50 |
| 8 | Sweden | 387-399=786 | +56 |
| 9 | Ireland | 391-399=790 | +60 |
| 10 | Belgium | 392-399=791 | +61 |
| 11 | Switzerland | 396-396=792 | +62 |
| 12 | Wales | 394-401=795 | +65 |
| 13 | Austria | 404-396=800 | +70 |
| 14 | Netherlands | 413-395=808 | +78 |
| 15 | Norway | 418-419=837 | +107 |
| 16 | Finland | 424-421=843 | +113 |

* Note: In the event of a tie the order was determined by the better total non-counting scores.

Individual leaders

| Place | Player | Country | Score | To par |
|---|---|---|---|---|
| 1 | Macarena Campomanes | Spain | 72-73=145 | −1 |
| T2 | Linda Bayman | England | 72-76=148 | +2 |
| T2 | Lora Fairclough | England | 76-72=148 | +2 |
| T2 | Sophie Louapre | France | 76-72=148 | +2 |
| T5 | Helen Dobson | England | 75-74=149 | +3 |
| T5 | Catarina Quintarelli | Italy | 73-76=149 | +3 |

Note: There was no official award for the lowest individual score.

Flight A

Bracket

Quarter finals
France | 5
Sweden | 2
Italy | 5
West Germany | 2
Scotland | 4
Spain | 3
England | 6
Denmark | 1

Semi finals
France | 5
Italy | 2
England | 4
Scotland | 3

Final
France | 4
England | 3
Bronze match
Italy
Scotland

Elimination matches
West Germany | 4
Sweden | 3
Spain | 5.5
Denmark | 1.5

Match for 5th place
Spain | 6
West Germany | 1
Match for 7th place
Sweden | 4
Denmark | 3

Final standings

| Place | Country |
|---|---|
| 1st place, gold medalist(s) | France |
| 2nd place, silver medalist(s) | England |
| 3rd place, bronze medalist(s) | Italy |
| 4 | Scotland |
| 5 | Spain |
| 6 | West Germany |
| 7 | Sweden |
| 8 | Denmark |
| 9 | Belgium |
| 10 | Wales |
| 11 | Ireland |
| 12 | Netherlands |
| 13 | Norway |
| 14 | Austria |
| 15 | Switzerland |
| 16 | Finland |

== See also ==
- Espirito Santo Trophy – biennial world amateur team golf championship for women organized by the International Golf Federation.
- European Amateur Team Championship – European amateur team golf championship for men organised by the European Golf Association.
