= Gråbo =

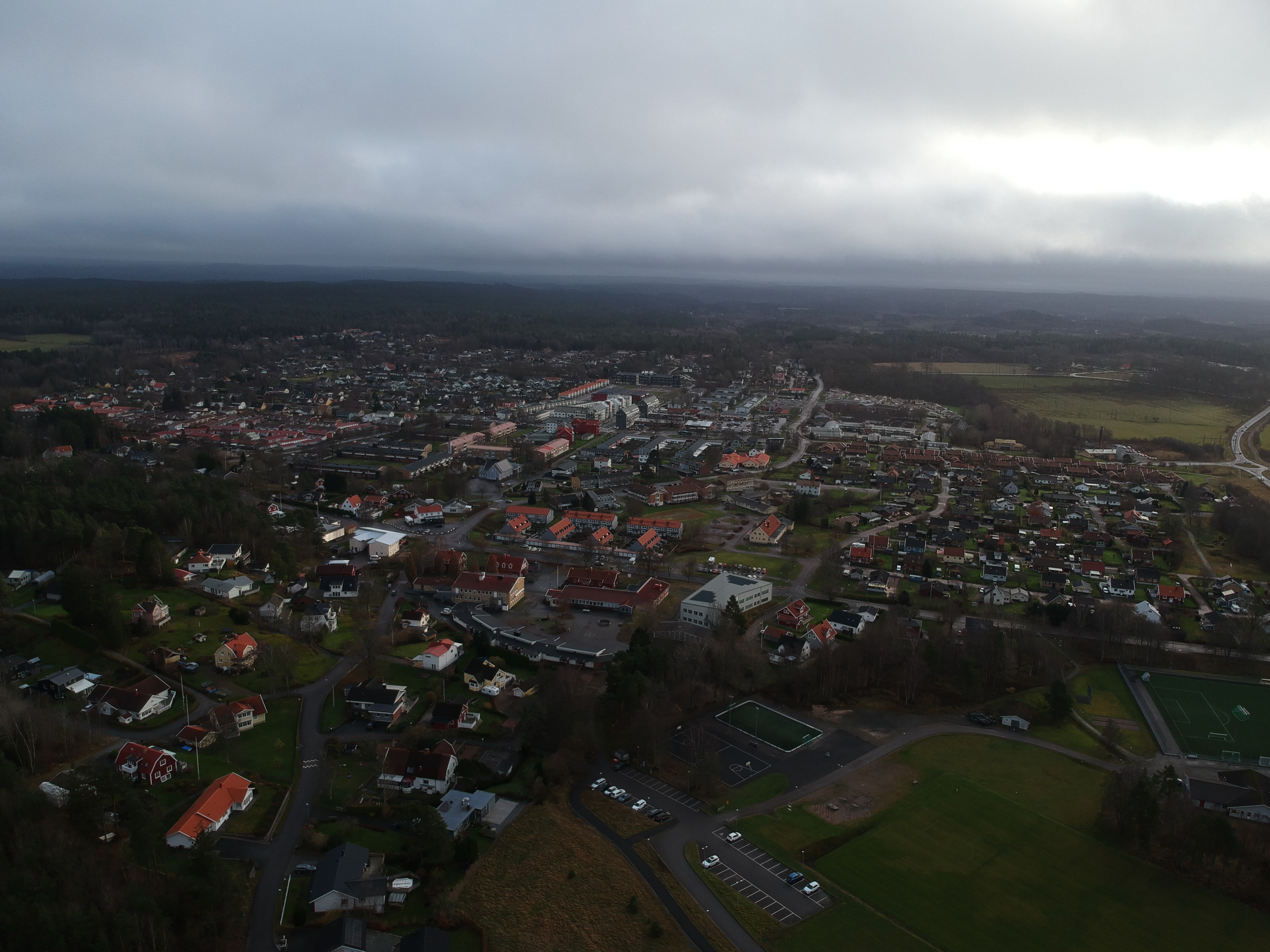
- Aerial photo of Gråbo in 2024

- Location within Västra Götaland Location within Sweden
- Coordinates: 57°50′N 12°17′E
- Country: Sweden
- Province: Västergötland
- County: Västra Götaland County
- Municipality: Lerum Municipality

Area
  - Total: 2.31 km^{2} (0.89 sq mi)

Population (31 December 2010)
  - Total: 4,195
  - Density: 1,817/km^{2} (4,710/sq mi)
- Time zone: UTC+1 (CET)
  - Summer (DST): UTC+2 (CEST)

Gråbo is a locality situated in Lerum Municipality, Västra Götaland County, Sweden. It had 4,195 inhabitants in 2010.
