= Women's Welsh Open =

Tournament information
- Location: St Pierre, Monmouthshire, Wales
- Established: 1995
- Course(s): St Pierre Golf & Country Club
- Par: 73
- Tour(s): Ladies European Tour
- Format: 72-hole Stroke play
- Final year: 1996

Final champion
- (England) Lisa Hackney

The Women's Welsh Open was a women's professional golf tournament on the Ladies European Tour.

The tournament was first played in 1995 at St Pierre Golf & Country Club in Chepstow, Wales, venue of the 1996 Solheim Cup. Laura Davies was the inaugural champion.

== Winners ==
Year	Winner	Country	Score	Margin of victory	Runner(s)-up
Women's Welsh Open
1996	Lisa Hackney	England	289 (–3)	1 stroke	(Spain) Laura Navarro, (Australia) Anne-Marie Knight
Woodpecker Women's Welsh Open
1995	Laura Davies	England	278 (–14)	3 strokes	(Australia) Wendy Doolan
