= Grundig Team Trophy =

Tournament information
- Location: Stockholm, Sweden
- Established: 1989
- Course: Royal Drottningholm Golf Club
- Par: 72
- Tour: Swedish Golf Tour
- Format: 36-hole best ball
- Prize fund: SEK 80,000
- Final year: 1991

Tournament record score
- Aggregate: 138 P. Nilsson & H. Hagström
- To par: –8 as above

Final champion
- Viveca Hoff & Marie Wennersten-From

The Grundig Team Trophy was a women's professional golf tournament on the Swedish Golf Tour played annually from 1989 until 1991. It was always held at Royal Drottningholm Golf Club in Stockholm, Sweden.

The 36-hole best ball tournament made its debut in 1989 and was immediately popular with the players.

Pia Nilsson and Hillewi Hagström successfully defended their title in 1990 in very wet conditions.

Amateurs Annika Sörenstam and Maria Bertilsköld were runner-ups at the final tournaments, one stroke behind winners Marie Wennersten-From and Viveca Hoff.

== Winners ==
Year	Winner	Score	Margin of victory	Runner(s)-up	Prize fund (SEK)	Ref
1991	(Sweden) Viveca Hoff & (Sweden) Marie Wennersten-From	139 (–7)	1 stroke	(Sweden) Maria Bertilsköld (a) & (Sweden) Annika Sörenstam (a)	80,000	
1990	(Sweden) Pia Nilsson & (Sweden) Hillewi Hagström	138 (–8)	2 strokes	(Sweden) Susann Norberg & (Sweden) Victoria Norman	80,000	
1989	(Sweden) Pia Nilsson & (Sweden) Hillewi Hagström	138 (–8)	1 stroke	(Sweden) Liv Wollin & (Sweden) Charlotte Montgomery	80,000	
