= Emily Tubert =

American professional golfer

Personal information
- Nationality: United States
- Born: May 15, 1992 (age 34) Burbank, California, U.S.

Career
- Sport: Golf
- College: University of Arkansas
- Status: Professional
- Former tours: Symetra Tour; LPGA Tour

Emily Tubert (born May 15, 1992) is an American professional golfer from Burbank, California. She has played on the Symetra Tour and LPGA Tour, in addition to being a World Long Drive competitor. Tubert competes in events that are sanctioned by the World Long Drive Association, which is owned by Golf Channel.

== Collegiate and amateur career ==
Prior to her professional career, Tubert was a three-time All-American while competing for the women's golf team at the University of Arkansas. Tubert competed in the 2013 U.S. Women's Open as an amateur while at Arkansas, and was a member of the United States Curtis Cup team in 2012. Prior to that, she won the U.S. Women's Amateur Public Links in 2010. She won the Dinah Shore Trophy Award as the top collegiate female golfer in 2014.

== On the LPGA Tour ==
Tubert's rookie year on the LPGA was in 2017 after earning status at the 2016 LPGA Final Qualifying Tournament, winning her stage by five strokes. In 2018, she made the cut at both the Meijer LPGA Classic and the Volunteers of America LPGA Texas Classic. As of March 2019, her lowest round on the tour was a 65, fired in the second round of the New Zealand Open.

== World Long Drive career ==
Tubert won her first-ever competition in August 2018 at the Tennessee Big Shots benefiting Niswonger Children's Hospital, and also advanced to the semifinals in September at the Volvik World Long Drive Championship (Oklahoma), both of which aired live on Golf Channel. After winning in Kingsport, Tennessee, on a Monday night, Tubert jumped in her car at 3:30 a.m. and drove to Indiana to compete in a practice round for an LPGA event the following day.

== U.S. national team appearances ==
- The Spirit International Amateur Golf Championship: 2011 (winners)
- Curtis Cup: 2012
