= Joanne Morley =

English golfer

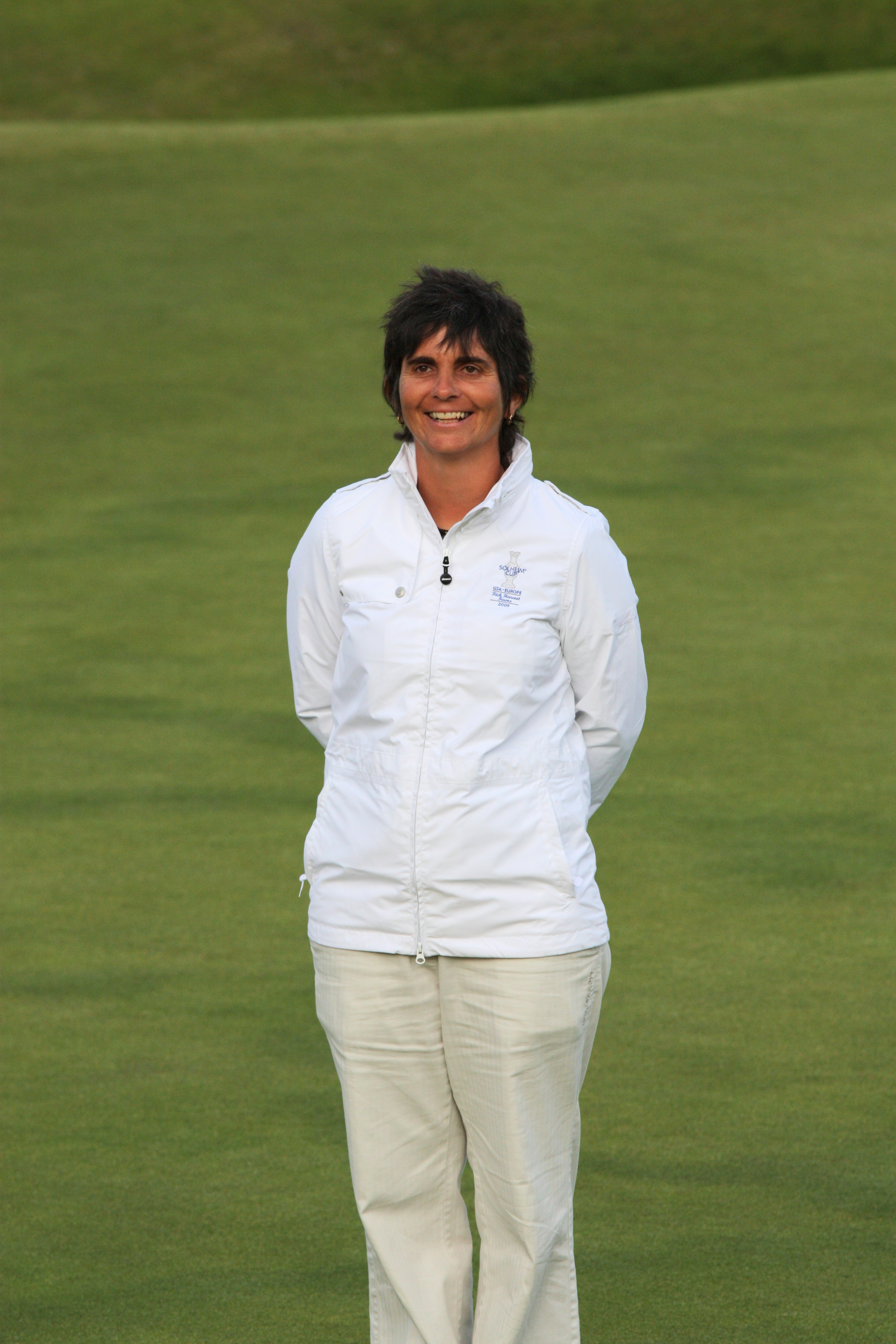
- Morley at the 2009 Women's British Open

Personal information
- Full name: Joanne Lois Morley
- Nationality: England
- Born: 30 December 1966 (age 59) Sale, England
- Height: 1.63 m (5 ft 4 in)

Career
- Sport: Golf
- Turned professional: 1993
- Former tours: Ladies European Tour (1994–2009); LPGA Tour (1997–2007)
- Professional wins: 2

Number of wins by tour
- Ladies European Tour: 2

Best results in LPGA major championships
- Chevron Championship: T42: 2001
- Women's PGA C'ship: T30: 1998
- U.S. Women's Open: T12: 2002
- du Maurier Classic: CUT: 1997
- Women's British Open: T42: 2001

Joanne Lois Morley (born 30 December 1966) is an English professional golfer.

Morley was born in Sale, Greater Manchester, United Kingdom. She was leading amateur at the Women's British Open in 1989 and 1993 and English Women's Strokeplay Champion in 1991 and 1992. Joanne was awarded the Daily Telegraph's Woman Golfer of the Year in 1991. She finished runner-up in the 1992 British Ladies Amateur. She played on the Great Britain and Ireland team in the 1992 Curtis Cup (winners) and the 1992 Espirito Santo Trophy (2nd place).

Morley is an Honorary Life Member of Cheshire Ladies County Golf Association, Altrincham Golf Club (where she started her golf) and Sale Golf Club.

Morley turned professional in late 1993 and initially played on the Ladies European Tour (LET), where she came a career best sixth on the Order of Merit in 1996. She has won the German Open twice 1996 and 2000. She made her first Solheim Cup appearance that year. From 1997 to 2007, she played mainly on the U.S.-based LPGA Tour where her best finish was third. She returned to the LET in 2008. She was an assistant captain at the 2009 and winning 2011 Solheim Cups.

== Professional wins (2) ==
=== Ladies European Tour wins (2) ===
- 1996 Ladies' German Open
- 2000 stilwerk Ladies' German Open

== Team appearances ==
Amateur

- European Ladies' Team Championship (representing England): 1991, 1993
- Vagliano Trophy (representing Great Britain & Ireland): 1991 (winners), 1993 (winners)
- Curtis Cup (representing Great Britain & Ireland): 1992 (winners)
- Espirito Santo Trophy (representing Great Britain & Ireland): 1992

Professional

- Solheim Cup (representing Europe): 1996
