= Sandrine Mendiburu =

French golfer

Personal information
- Nationality: France
- Born: 15 October 1972 (age 54) Saint-Jean-de-Luz, France

Career
- Sport: Golf
- Turned professional: 1991
- Former tour: Ladies European Tour
- Professional wins: 4

Number of wins by tour
- Ladies European Tour: 3
- Ladies Asian Golf Tour: 1

Best results in LPGA major championships
- Chevron Championship: DNP
- Women's PGA C'ship: DNP
- U.S. Women's Open: CUT: 1991
- Women's British Open: DNP

Sandrine Mendiburu (born 15 October 1972) is a retired French professional golfer.

In 1999 Mendiburu recorded back-to-back wins on the Ladies European Tour, winning the Donegal Irish Ladies' Open in a four-way a playoff and Ladies Hannover Expo 2000 Open, which she followed up with a runner-up position at Air France Madame Open two weeks later. She ended the season fifth on the LET Order of Merit.

== Amateur wins ==
- 1990 U.S. Girls' Junior

== Professional wins (4) ==
=== Ladies European Tour wins (3) ===
No.	Date	Tournament	Winning score	Margin of victory	Runner(s)-up
1	27 May 1994	Costa Azul Ladies Open	−4 (140)	1 stroke	(England) Lora Fairclough
2	5 Sep 1999	Donegal Irish Ladies' Open	+2 (71-72-71-72=286)	Playoff	(Spain) Raquel Carriedo (England) Laura Davies (Germany) Elisabeth Esterl
3	19 Sep 1999	Ladies Hannover Expo 2000 Open	−8 (73-64-71=208)	2 strokes	(England) Lora Fairclough

Ladies European Tour playoff record (1–0)

No.	Year	Tournament	Opponent	Result
1	1999	Donegal Irish Ladies' Open	(Spain) Raquel Carriedo (England) Laura Davies (Germany) Elisabeth Esterl	Won with par on second extra hole. Esterl eliminated on first extra hole.

=== Ladies Asian Golf Tour wins (1) ===
No.	Date	Tournament	Winning score	Margin of victory	Runner-up
1	14 Feb 1998	Malaysia JAL Ladies Open	−5 (71-66-74=211)	1 stroke	(Australia) Loraine Lambert

== Team appearances ==
Amateur

- European Ladies' Team Championship (representing France): 1989 (winners)
- Espirito Santo Trophy (representing France): 1990

Professional

- Praia d'El Rey European Cup (representing Ladies European Tour): 1999 (winners)
