= Bertha Thompson =

English amateur golfer

Personal information
- Full name: Bertha Mildred Thompson
- Nationality: England
- Born: 25 October 1876 Terrington, Yorkshire, England
- Died: 8 December 1953 (aged 77) Midhurst, Sussex, England

Career
- Sport: Golf
- Status: Amateur

Bertha Mildred Thompson (married name Walker, 25 October 1876 – 8 December 1953) was an English amateur golfer. She won the 1905 Women's Amateur Championship at Royal Cromer and reached the final the following year. She reached the quarter-finals in 1900, 1909 and 1911. She was a regular player for England in international matches between 1899 and 1911, only missing the 1910 Women's Home Internationals, when she withdrew. The official Home Internationals started in 1905 and although she played in the event six times, she was only in the winning team once, in her final appearance in 1911.

== Golf career ==
Thompson played in the 1897 Women's Amateur Championship at Gullane, representing the Beverley and East Riding club. After a bye in the first round she beat Miss Bloxsom 4&3 and then Miss Lugton after a tie. She then lost 6&5 at the last-16 stage, to Madeline Campbell. The 1898 championship was held at Great Yarmouth & Caister. Thompson, representing the Scarborough club, beat Mrs. Hezlet, the mother of the famous sisters, 8&6 in the first round. She then lost, by one hole, to Issette Pearson in the second round.

Thompson traveled to Ireland to play in the 1899 championship at County Down but lost in the first round to Lottie Dod. A match between Ireland and England was played the day after the championship finished. Thompson played for the England team but lost by 10 holes to Rhona Adair. Despite this loss, England won six of the nine matches, winning by 37 holes to 18. The 1900 championship was held at Westward Ho!. Thompson reached the quarter-finals before losing 3&2 to Molly Whigham.

The 1901 championship was played at Aberdovey in Wales. An international match between England and Ireland was played before the Women's Amateur Championship. This time the result was decided by matches rather than holes, Ireland winning 5–2. As in 1899, Thompson played Rhona Adair, but this time she won her match. She beat Jessie Magill and Maud Titterton on the second day but lost again to Issette Pearson, at the last-16 stage, on the final hole. In 1902, at Royal Cinque Ports, a Scottish team competed for the first time in the international matches. On the first day, England beat Ireland, although Thompson lost 7&5 to May Hezlet. The following day England beat Scotland, Thompson halving her match with Molly Graham. In the second round of the championship, Thompson again met May Hezlet, losing again, but this time the match was much closer, Hezlet winning by two holes.

In 1903 at Royal Portrush there were too few Scottish players to make a team and the only international was one between Ireland and England, Ireland winning 9–1 with Thompson losing to Maud Stuart. Thompson met Florence Hezlet in the third round. She was dormie-three up but eventually lost the match at the 20th hole. In the 1904 internationals, England beat Scotland 5–4, Ireland beat England 6–3 and Scotland beat Ireland 7–2, one match being halved in each contest. The first two matches were played at Royal Troon, the third at Prestwick. Thompson won her two matches, beating Madge Maitland and Maud Stewart. Thompson struggled in the early rounds of the championship, winning her opening two matches at the 21st and 20th holes. She then beat Issette Pearson before losing to Lottie Dod at the last-16 stage.

The 1905 Women's Amateur Championship was held at Royal Cromer. It saw the inaugural Women's Home Internationals, teams competing for the Miller challenge trophy. Thompson lost her match against Scotland but won against Ireland. In the championship, Thompson reached the fourth round where she beat Lottie Dod 4&2. On the third day Thompson won both her matches at extra holes. She met Margaret Curtis at the last-16 stage, winning at the 19th hole and then beat Evelyn Steel at the 20th hole. She met Winifred Brown in the semi-finals, winning 2&1. The final was against Maud Stuart. Thompson was three up after five holes, but Stuart won the next three holes. Thompson then took a two-hole lead and won the match 3&2 after winning the 16th hole.

The 1906 Women's Amateur Championship was played at Burnham & Berrow. Thompson lost both her matches in the Home Internationals, to Dorothy Campbell and May Hezlet, England again finishing runners-up to Scotland. In the championship she won her early matches by large margins to reach the last-16 stage. On the third day she beat two international players, Evelyn Morant, 4&3, and Violet Tynte, 5&4. In the semi-finals she beat Amy Sumpter, winning 3&2 after being five up at the turn. In the final she met Alice Kennion. The match was level after 10 holes but Thompson hurt her thumb and lost the match 4&3.

The 1907 championship was played at County Down. Wales played in the Home Internationals for the first time. Ireland won all their matches to win the title with England runners-up. Thompson lost to Florence Walker-Leigh but won her other two matches. She reached the last-16 but lost again to Walker-Leigh. In 1908 the championship was played on the Old Course at St Andrews. In the internationals Thompson lost two of her three matches, to Florence Hezlet and Dorothy Campbell. She again reached the last-16 in the championship, losing to Maud Titterton by one hole. The 1909 championship was held at Birkdale. In the internationals she lost again to Dorothy Campbell and then to Blanche Duncan of Wales. In the championship she beat Hilda Mather in the last-16, at the final hole, but lost 3&2 to Florence Hezlet in the quarter-finals.

Thompson was selected for the home internationals in 1910, but withdrew, and then lost at an early stage in the championship. In 1911 Wales were unable to raise a team for the internationals at Royal Portrush. England won both their matches to win the title for the first time since it was officially started in 1905. Thompson beat Mabel Harrison but lost to Elsie Grant Suttie, in her final appearance in the internationals. She reached the quarter-finals of the championship, losing to Violet Hezlet. In her last-16 match against Canadian Violet Pooley, she was six down after 10 holes but then won seven holes in a row and halved the last, to win the match.

Thompson withdrew from the 1912 championship. In 1913 she lost in the first round, while in 1914 she reached the third round before losing 7&5 to Florence Bourn.

== Personal life ==
Thompson was born in October 1876 in Terrington, Yorkshire, the daughter of George Arthur Thompson and his wife Dora née Cayley. George Thompson died in November 1908, Dora in April 1931. He was in the 12th Royal Lancers but in 1882 was elected Registrar of Wills and Deeds for the East Riding of Yorkshire, a position he held until two or three years before his death, when the position was taken over by the county council . Thompson married John Harry Walker on 30 June 1914. John Walker died in March 1952, while Bertha died in December 1953.

== Team appearances ==
- Women's Home Internationals (representing England): 1899, 1901, 1902, 1903, 1904, 1905, 1906, 1907, 1908, 1909, 1911 (winners)
