= Alice Kennion =

English amateur golfer

Personal information
- Full name: Alice Marion Kennion
- Nationality: England
- Born: 6 August 1876 Blackheath, Kent, England
- Died: 5 April 1952 (aged 75) Midhurst, Sussex, England

Career
- Sport: Golf
- Status: Amateur

Alice Marion Kennion (née Kenyon-Stow, 6 August 1876 – 5 April 1952) was an English amateur golfer. She was a surprise winner of the 1906 Women's Amateur Championship at Burnham & Berrow Golf Club. She was the first married woman to win the championship.

== Golf career ==
Kennion first learnt to play golf at Wimbledon, later playing for the Brighton and Hove club. She was only an irregular competitor in the Women's Amateur Championship but, in 1906, became the first married woman to win the championship.

Kennion played in the 1896 championship at the Royal Liverpool Golf Club at Hoylake. Playing out of the Wimbledon club she won her early matches easily, Winning her first round match 8&7 and then winning 6&5 and 7&6 on the second day. On the third day she beat Miss Latham 5&3 but lost to Katherine Moeller 4&3 in the quarter-finals.

Kennion played in the 1905 championship at Royal Cromer, losing 3&2 in the third round to Scottish international Madge Maitland.

The 1906 Women's Amateur Championship was played at Burnham & Berrow. Kennion was representing the Brighton club. In the first round she beat Miss Gowan from the home club, 3&2. On the second day she beat Mrs Wood 4&3 and Mrs Storry 6&5. She beat Miss Pearce on the third morning and met Florence Hezlet in the quarter-finals in the afternoon. Kennion was two down with four to play but won the 15th and 18th and then won the match at the first extra hole. In the semi-finals she beat Dorothy Campbell 3&1 and then beat Bertha Thompson 4&3 in the final.

Kennion played for England in the 1910 Women's Home Internationals at Westward Ho!, losing all her three matches, and then lost in the first round of the championship, 3&2 to Miss Saunderson.

== Personal life ==
Kennion was born in August 1876 in Blackheath, Kent, the daughter of Frederick Melkington Kenyon-Stow, an army officer, and his wife Alice Millicent née Peat. In April 1900 she married Captain Roger Lloyd Kennion. Kennion was an officer in the British Indian Army. Roger Kennion died in March 1942. Alice Kennion died in April 1952. She had a daughter Iris born in India in 1901 and a son Wilfred born in England in 1904.

== Team appearances ==
- Women's Home Internationals (representing England): 1910
