= Maud Titterton =

English amateur golfer

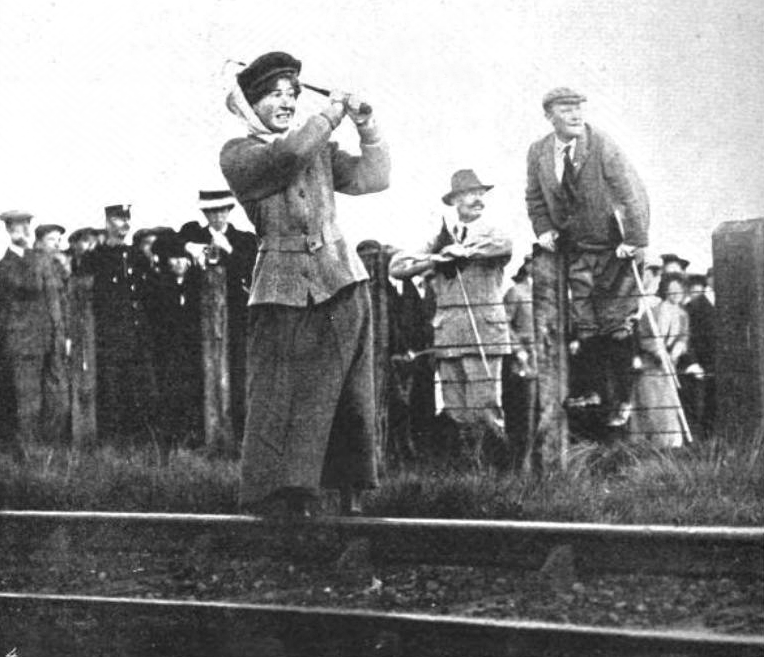
- In The Sketch, 27 May 1908

Personal information
- Full name: Emily Maud Titterton
- Nationality: England
- Born: 1867 Birmingham, England
- Died: 2 May 1932 (aged 65) Edinburgh, Scotland

Career
- Sport: Golf
- Status: Amateur

Emily Maud Titterton (married name Gibb, 1867 – 2 May 1932) was an amateur golfer. She won the Women's Amateur Championship on the Old Course at St Andrews in 1908.

== Golf career ==
Titterton played in the 1897 Women's Amateur Championship at Gullane, the championship being held in Scotland for the first time. She reached the semi-finals before losing to the eventual winner, Edith Orr, by two holes. In 1898 at Great Yarmouth & Caister she reached the last-16 stage, losing to Miss Stringer by one hole. The following year at County Down she lost at an early stage to Jessie Magill, who went on the reach the final. In 1901 at Aberdovey she met Bertha Thompson at the last-32 stage and lost by two holes. Titterton played for Scotland in the Women's internationals at Deal in 1902. On the first day, England beat Ireland and Ireland beat Scotland. The following day England beat Scotland 8–0 with two matches halved. Titterton won her first match and halved the other. She reached the last-16 in the championship, losing to Lottie Dod.

Titterton missed top-level golf in 1903 and 1904 but returned in the 1905 Women's Amateur Championship at Royal Cromer. She won four matches before losing to Dorothy Campbell at the last-16 stage. She also reached the last-16 of the Scottish Women's Amateur Championship, losing to Molly Graham. In 1906 she played for England in the Women's Home Internationals. However she again disappointed in the main events, losing in the second round in both the Women's Amateur and Scottish Women's Amateur. Titterton won all her three matches in the 1907 Home Internationals, although England again finished runners-up after losing to Ireland. She reached the quarter-finals of the women's championship, before losing to Violet Henry-Anderson, and the last-16 of the Scottish championship.

The 1908 Women's Amateur Championship was played on the Old Course at St Andrews. As usual the Women's Home Internationals were played first, Titterton playing again for England. The result was decided by the match against Scotland on the second day, Scotland winning 6 matches to 3, Titterton losing to Elsie Grant Suttie. Titterton had a bye in the first round and won her three matches on the opening two days, none going past the 16th hole. She had two close matches on the third day. In the morning she beat Bertha Thompson by one hole and then beat Elsie Kyle at the 24th hole. She beat Cecil Leitch by one hole in the semi-finals and met Dorothy Campbell in the final. The match was delayed because Campbell's semi-final match had gone to the 22nd hole. Titterton was three up with five to play but Campbell won three of the next four holes to level the match. The 18th was halved taking the match to extra holes. Titterton made a 4 at the first hole to win a close match. The following month, Titterton and Campbell met in the quarter-finals of the Scottish Women's Amateur Championship. Campbell won a close match by one hole and went on to win the title.

Titterton withdrew from the 1909 championship following the death of her fiance. She played in the 1910 Women's Home Internationals at Westward Ho!, winning all her three matches, but lost in the first round of the championship, 2&1 to Mabel Harrison. Titterton withdrew from the 1911 championship following the death of her father.

Titterton played in the 1912 Women's Amateur Championship at Turnberry, competing as Mrs Gibb. She competed in the Women's Home Internationals. She lost her two matches on the first day and missed the final day match against Scotland through illness. In the championship she met Winifred Martin Smith in the first round, losing at the 19th hole.

After her marriage Titterton lived in South Africa for a number of years, winning the South African championship twice, at Durban in 1913 and at Port Elizabeth in 1914. She was the first president of the South African Ladies Golf Union from 1914 to 1916 and again from 1919 to 1923, returning to Britain during World War I.

== Personal life ==
Titterton was born in 1867 in Birmingham, England, the daughter of Charles Richard Titterton, a varnish maker, and his Scottish-born wife Julia née Steel. In the early 1880s the family moved to Edinburgh. Titterton was engaged to Charles Edward Dewar, however he died in South Africa in April 1909, aged 29, before they were married. Her mother, Julia, died in August 1910, while her father, Charles Titterton, died in April 1911. In early 1912 she married John Alexander Philip Gibb, an Edinburgh-born mining engineer working in South Africa. Gibb was in the Royal Engineers during World War I. He moved to Canada in 1924 and died in Toronto in March 1926, aged 46. After his death Titterton returned to Edinburgh where she died in May 1932, aged 65. She had no children.

== Team appearances ==
- Women's Home Internationals (representing Scotland): 1902, (representing England): 1906, 1907, 1908, 1910, 1912 (winners)
