= Lena Thomson =

Scottish amateur golfer

Personal information
- Full name: Helena Agnes Thomson
- Nationality: Scotland
- Born: 27 December 1868 Stoke Newington, London, England
- Died: 3 April 1938 (aged 69) Marseille, France

Career
- Sport: Golf
- Status: Amateur

Helena Agnes Thomson (married name Helena Towne or Helena Lyndhurst Towne; 27 December 1868 – 3 April 1938) was an amateur golfer. She won the Women's Amateur Championship at Great Yarmouth & Caister in 1898. She was born in England to Scottish parents.

== Golf career ==
Thomson played in the first Women's Amateur Championship on the ladies links of the Lytham & St Annes Golf Club in June 1893. Playing out of the Wimbledon club, she reached the quarter-finals before losing to Florence Carr. A handicap competition was arranged on the final day for those knocked-out on the first two days.Thomson, playing off a handicap of 5, won the event with a net score of 86. She reached the quarter-finals again in 1894 at Littlestone-on-Sea, losing by one hole to May Mugliston. Thomson won a scratch competition played on the final day with a score of 92.

Thomson played in the 1895 Women's Amateur Championship at Royal Portrush. losing at the last-16 stage to Maud Starkie Bence. The first international match was played between England and Ireland the day after the championship. There were 6 ladies in each team, with Thomson being in the English team. England won all six matches, winning by 34 holes to 0. The 1896 championship was played at Royal Liverpool Golf Club at Hoylake. She beat Emma Kennedy in the quarter-finals at the 19th hole. In the semi-finals she met Issette Pearson, winning another close match by one hole. Thomson met Amy Pascoe in the final, losing 3&2. In 1897 the championship was held in Scotland for the first time, at Gullane. Thomson had an early defeat, losing in the third round, the last-32, to Madeline Campbell by one hole.

The 1898 championship was held at Great Yarmouth & Caister. Thomson had a walk-over on the opening day, to advance to the last-64 stage. On the second day she won her morning match 3&2 and met Sophie Stubbs in the third round, The match went to the 21st hole before Thomson won. Thomson won both her matches on the third day 4&2, to advance to the semi-finals. On the final day she met a local lady, Amy Barwell in the semi-finals. Barwell was two up after four holes but Thomson eventually won 4&3. Thomson met Elinor Nevile in the final. Nevile played poorly and Thomson was 5 up after 9 holes, eventually winning the match 6&5.

The 1899 championship was held at County Down. Competing as Mrs Lyndhurst Towne, she reached the quarter-finals, losing 6&4 to a local player, Jessie Magill, the 1898 Irish champion.

A triangular series of internationals was arranged at Deal in 1902, before the Women's Amateur Championship. Thomson played for the Scottish team. On the first day, Scotland lost to Ireland, Thomson losing to Nellie Graham. The following day England beat Scotland 8–0 with two matches halved, Thomson losing to Katherine Moeller. In the championship itself, she lost in the second round.

== Personal life ==
Thomson was born in December 1868 in Stoke Newington, London, the daughter of Robert Thomson, a ship owner, and Margaret née Bonthron. She married Edward Charles Lyndhurst Towne in November 1898. In 1889, the family had moved to a new house, Grangemuir, opposite Wimbledon Common. Robert Thomson died in Wimbledon in June 1909, aged 70. Lena Thomson died in Marseille, France in April 1938, aged 69.

== Team appearances ==
- Women's internationals (representing England): 1895, (representing Scotland): 1902
