= Amelia Garvey =

New Zealand professional golfer (born 2000)

Personal information
- Full name: Amelia Rose Garvey
- Nationality: New Zealand
- Born: 2 June 2000 (age 26) Manchester, England
- Height: 5 ft 9 in (1.75 m)

Career
- Sport: Golf
- College: University of Southern California
- Turned professional: 2021
- Current tour: Ladies European Tour (joined 2025)
- Former tour: Epson Tour (2022–2024)

Best results in LPGA major championships
- Chevron Championship: DNP
- Women's PGA C'ship: DNP
- U.S. Women's Open: T58: 2024
- Women's British Open: T23: 2026
- Evian Championship: DNP

Amelia Rose Garvey (born 2 June 2000) is a New Zealand professional golfer and Ladies European Tour player. She was runner-up at the 2019 Women's Amateur Championship, the 2023 and 2024 FireKeepers Casino Hotel Championship, and the 2025 Wistron Ladies Open.

== Early life and amateur career ==
Garvey, born in Manchester, England, moved to New Zealand with her family when she was five years old, and was raised in Christchurch. She began playing golf in 2006 when she was six. In 2017, she was runner-up at the Faldo Series Asia Grand Final and South Australia Junior Amateur Championship, and won the New Zealand Women's Stroke Play Championship.

She was runner-up at the 2019 The Women's Amateur Championship at Royal County Down, losing the final to Emily Toy, 1 up.

Garvey represented New Zealand internationally at the 2015 Junior Golf World Cup in Japan, the 2017 Queen Sirikit Cup in China and the 2018 Espirito Santo Trophy in Ireland. She won the 2019 Astor Trophy in Canada, beating a British team with Alice Hewson, Lily May Humphreys, Olivia Mehaffey and Emily Toy.

Garvey attended the University of Southern California from 2018 to 2021. Playing with the USC Trojans women's golf team, she was a three-time All-American and two-time All-Pac-12 first team selection. She played in the NCAA Championship three times, finishing 7th as a freshman. She helped USC win two Pac-12 titles, and in 2021 was runner-up at the Pac-12 Championship behind Rachel Heck, and earned an invitation to the Augusta National Women's Amateur Championship.

== Professional career ==
Garvey turned professional in 2021 and joined the Epson Tour in 2022. She was runner-up at the FireKeepers Casino Hotel Championship in 2023 and again in 2024, a stroke behind Cassie Porter.

In 2024, during the final round of the Royal St Cloud Women's Championship on the NXXT Women's Pro Tour in Florida, Garvey made history being the first professional golfer to record a par, birdie, eagle, hole in one, and albatross all in one round, a one in 4.5 trillion likelihood. She also had a 1, 2, 3, 4, 5 and a 6 on her scorecard.

She made her 4th U.S. Women's Open appearance in 2024 at the Lancaster Country Club, and made the cut.

In 2025, after three seasons on the Epson Tour, Garvey joined the Ladies European Tour after earning a card by finishing 4th at Q-School. In October, she finished runner-up at the Wistron Ladies Open, which propelled her into the top-200 of the Women's World Golf Rankings for the first time.

== Amateur wins ==
- 2016 Muriwai Open
- 2017 South Island Stroke Play Championship, New Zealand Women's Stroke Play Championship

== Results in LPGA majors ==
Tournament	2020	2021	2022	2023	2024	2025	2026
Chevron Championship							
U.S. Women's Open	CUT	CUT		CUT	T58		
Women's PGA Championship							
The Evian Championship							
Women's British Open						CUT	T23

Did not play

CUT = missed the half-way cut
T = tied

== Team appearances ==
Amateur

- New Zealand Interprovincial (representing Canterbury): 2013, 2014, 2015, 2016
- Junior Golf World Cup (representing New Zealand): 2015
- Queen Sirikit Cup (representing New Zealand): 2017
- Espirito Santo Trophy (representing New Zealand): 2018
- Astor Trophy (representing New Zealand): 2019 (winners)
