= Amy Pascoe =

English amateur golfer

Personal information
- Full name: Amy Bennet Pascoe
- Nationality: England
- Born: 19 March 1866 Barnstaple, Devon, England
- Died: 18 February 1917 (aged 50) Woking, Surrey, England

Career
- Sport: Golf
- Status: Amateur

Amy Bennet Pascoe (19 March 1866 – 18 February 1917) was an English amateur golfer. She won the Women's Amateur Championship at Hoylake in 1896.

== Golf career ==
Pascoe played in the 1895 Women's Amateur Championship at Royal Portrush, losing 4&3 to the defending champion, Lady Margaret Scott. The first international match was played between England and Ireland the day after the championship. There were 6 ladies in each team, with Pascoe being in the English team. England won all six matches, winning by 34 holes to 0.

The 1896 championship was played at the Royal Liverpool Golf Club at Hoylake. There were 82 entries but that did not include Lady Margaret Scott. Pascoe had a bye in the first round but met Alice Richardson, a semi-finalist in 1895, in the second round. Pascoe won 5&4 and then beat Kate Catterall by two holes in the afternoon. On the third day she beat Maud Starkie Bence, a semi-finalist in 1894, at the 19th hole, after being two holes down with three to play, and then beat Miss Nimmo. In the semi-finals she met Katherine Moeller. Moeller was 4 up after 6 holes and still 3 up after 9. However Pascoe then won six of the next seven holes to win 3&2. Pascoe met Lena Thomson in the final, winning 3&2.

Pascoe played for England against Ireland in an international match at Aberdovey in 1901, played before the championship. Ireland won the match 5–2, with Pascoe losing to May Hezlet. In the championship itself Pascoe lost in the third round. She also played in the Women's internationals at Deal in 1902. On the first day, England beat Ireland and Ireland beat Scotland. The following day England beat Scotland 8–0 with two matches halved. Pascoe won both her matches. Pascoe lost in the third round of the championship to Maud Titterton.

== Personal life ==
Pascoe was born in March 1866 in Barnstaple, Devon, the daughter of John Bennet Pascoe, a solicitor, and his wife Agnes Ann. They later moved to Bath, Somerset. John Bennet Pascoe died in 1871 aged 40, when Amy was five years old. Pascoe died in Woking, Surrey in February 1917, aged 50. She was unmarried.

== Team appearances ==
- Women's internationals (representing England): 1895, 1901, 1902
