= Kris Kim =

English amateur golfer (born 2007)

Personal information
- Nationality: England
- Born: 30 September 2007 (age 19)

Career
- Sport: Golf
- Status: Amateur

Kris Kim (born 30 September 2007) is an English amateur golfer.

== Early life ==
Kim is from Surrey and started playing as a junior at Cuddington Golf Club. Both his parents played golf professionally and he is coached by his mother, Ji Hyun Suh. His father Ki Yong Kim played on the Fiji tour. Kim is a member of Cuddington Golf Club in Banstead and Walton Heath Golf Club in Walton-on-the-Hill. He attends Epsom College.

== Amateur career ==
Kim won the England U-14s title by seven shots in 2021.

=== 2023 ===
In April 2023, Kim won the Fairhaven Trophy by six shots, and shortly afterwards joined the international stable of golfers on the CJ Group, including Im Sung-jae, Kim Si-woo, Lee Kyoung-hoon and An Byeong-hun on the PGA Tour. In July 2023, Kim won the McGregor Trophy, the English Boys' Under-16 Open Championship, at Hunstanton Golf Club. In August 2023, he won the Boys Amateur Championship at Ganton Golf Club.

That season, Kim represented England in the European Boys' Team Championship at the Golf Club of Geneva, breaking the course record with a 65 and helping his team secure the bronze medal. He also won the European Boys' Individual Championship and went undefeated at the Junior Ryder Cup at the Marco Simone Golf and Country Club in Rome, which saw Kim claim three wins and a half point in Europe's first victory in the match since 2006 and included 5 and 4 routing of American Miles Russell. Kim was nominated for the SportsAid's One-to-Watch Award in December 2023.

=== 2024 ===
In February 2024, Kim was awarded 2024 Performance of the Year at Tuesday's England Golf Centenary Dinner & Awards at The Midland Manchester Hotel. In April 2024, he made his PGA Tour debut at the CJ Cup Byron Nelson in Texas. On his debut round on the PGA Tour, he hit a three under-par 68. The following day, he became the youngest player to make the cut at a PGA Tour event since 2015. In May 2024, he was announced as playing at the 2024 British Masters.

== Sponsorship ==
Kim became the first European amateur to sign a NIL contract (Name, image and likeness) with Under Armour, and the first British amateur to sign a NIL deal with TaylorMade.

== Amateur wins ==
- 2023 Fairhaven Trophy, McGregor Trophy, Boys Amateur Championship

== Team appearances ==
- European Boys' Team Championship (representing England): 2023, 2024
- Girls and Boys Home Internationals (representing England): 2023 (winners)
- Jacques Léglise Trophy (representing Great Britain & Ireland): 2023
- Junior Ryder Cup (representing Europe): 2023 (winners), 2025
