= Amateur Golf Championship =

Amateur Golf Championship may refer to:

- U.S. Amateur
- United States Women's Amateur Golf Championship
- The Amateur Championship
- The Women's Amateur Championship
