= Notts Golf Club =

Notts Golf Club (Hollinwell)
- Location within Nottinghamshire
- 53.08426°N 1.22244°W

Club information
- Location: Kirkby in Ashfield, Nottinghamshire, England
- Established: 1887
- Type: Private
- Total holes: 18
- Tournaments: Brabazon Trophy; English Amateur; British Ladies Amateur Golf Championship; John Player Classic; John Player Trophy; British PGA Matchplay Championship; British Masters; Haig Whisky TPC; Boys Amateur Championship; Jacques Léglise Trophy
- Website: http://www.nottsgolfclub.co.uk
- Designed by: Willie Park, Jr.
- Par: 72
- Length: 7,250 yards (6,630 m)
- Course rating: 76

Notts Golf Club, more commonly referred to simply as Hollinwell, is an 18-hole members golf club in Nottinghamshire, England which has hosted a number of leading amateur and professional competitions. The course has widely been reviewed as one of the top 50 courses in England and the British Isles.

== Name ==
The name Hollinwell reportedly relates to the presence of a holy well in trees close to the 8th fairway, and is the more-commonly used name for the golf course itself. However the members belong to the Notts Golf Club and Hollinwell is the name of the course on which the club plays. In concession to this, the two names are usually both used when formally referring to the club giving rise to the name Notts Golf Club (Hollinwell).

== History ==
Notts Golf Club was initially founded as the Nottingham Golf Club in 1887 and started on a 5-hole course using a recreation ground under the permission of the local council. This was soon found to be inadequate and during the same year the club moved to Bulwell Forest, where a seven-hole course was established.

In 1891 Notts Ladies' Golf Club was established playing on the same ground at Bulwell Forest, whilst these two clubs have remained together ever since they still remain separate clubs to this date.

The club moved to its current location at Hollinwell in 1901. The course was initially designed by Willie Park, Jr. on an area of land leased to the golf club. This land was subsequently purchased by the golf club in 1924. Some changes regarding the bunkering were made by J.H. Taylor in 1902, however the largest changes happened following an extension to the course by Tom Williamson in 1912. The layout designed in 1912 has remained largely unchanged to date, however the course has been significantly lengthened to remain a competitive challenge in modern golf.

Since its inception the course has been host to a number of top amateur and professional competitions.

=== Notable members ===
- Enid Wilson, 3 time winner of the British Ladies Amateur Golf Championship and Curtis Cup player.

== Course and scorecard ==
There is a single 18-hole course at Hollinwell which takes the form of a heathland course, from the championship tees the course measures 7,250 yards.

Tee	Rating/Slope	1	2	3	4	5	6	7	8	9	Out	10	11	12	13	14	15	16	17	18	In	Total
Par	Men's	4	4	5	4	3	5	4	4	3	36	4	4	4	3	4	4	4	5	4	36	72
SI	Men's	9	5	13	1	15	7	3	11	17		14	8	2	16	10	4	12	18	6
Blue	76	381	462	547	454	189	582	404	408	178	3605	414	360	474	241	403	439	353	501	460	3645	7250
White	74	366	428	514	440	189	540	404	363	178	3422	364	360	430	198	387	439	353	501	460	3492	6914
Yellow	73	351	413	482	429	165	516	388	357	149	3250	350	353	423	179	368	421	349	486	440	3369	6619
Par	Women's	4	5	4	5	3	5	4	4	3	37	4	4	5	3	4	4	4	5	5	38	75
SI	Women's	9	13	1	12	17	3	5	7	18			16	8	6	14	4	2	10	11
Red	75	348	391	395	397	139	453	353	326	108	2909	265	269	406	182	349	352	309	419	411	2962	5871

All distances given in yards

== Tournaments hosted ==
=== Brabazon Trophy ===
The club has hosted the English Men's Open Amateur Stroke Play Championship for the Brabazon Trophy on 4 occasions. The club first hosted the competition in 1959 when Doug Sewell of England won with a total score of 287. The club hosted the competition for the second time in 1975 when Sandy Lyle prevailed with a total score of 298. It was only 8 years till the club once again hosted the competition in 1983 when Charlie Banks won with a score of 294. A further 9 years later in 1992 the club hosted the competition for the 4th time with Ignacio Garrido of Spain taking the trophy with a score of 280.

In March 2013 Notts Golf Club was selected by England Golf to host the Brabazon Trophy again in 2015 after an absence of 23 years. The 2015 Brabazon Trophy was won by Cormac Sharvin of Northern Ireland with a seven under par score.

=== English Amateur ===
The club has also hosted the English Amateur on 4 occasions during its history, it first hosted the competition in 1935 when John Woollam was victorious. It did not host the competition again unit 1964 when David Marsh won, following this the club next hosted the competition in 1996 when Shaun P. Webster won. The club most recently hosted the competition in 2004 when James Heath beat David Horsey in the final.

=== British Ladies Amateur Golf Championship ===
Hollinwell hosted the British Ladies Amateur Golf Championship once in 1978 when Edwina Kennedy of Australia was victorious over Julia Greenhalgh of England in the final.

=== John Player Classic ===
The club hosted the inaugural John Player Classic in 1970 when Christy O'Connor Snr triumphed by one stroke over Tony Jacklin. At the time the $60,000 first place prize was the largest ever from a professional tournament hosted in England.

=== John Player Trophy ===
The club also hosted the John Player Trophy on the European Tour in 1970, a tournament which was won by Clive Clark.

=== British PGA Matchplay Championship ===
The British PGA Matchplay Championship then known as the News of the World Match Play was the first professional tournament hosted by the club in 1906 and was won by Sandy Herd.

=== British Masters ===
The club hosted the British Masters for the only time in its history in 1957 when Eric Brown of Scotland won with a score of 275.

=== Haig Whisky TPC ===
Hollinwell hosted the Haig Whisky TPC on the European Tour in 1982 when Nick Faldo won with an 18 under par score of 270.

=== Boys Amateur Championship ===
In 2012 the club hosted the Boys Amateur Championship for the 1st time alongside Coxmoor Golf Club, the competition was won by future English Amateur winner Matt Fitzpatrick, in the final Fitzpatrick won 10&8.

=== Jacques Léglise Trophy ===
In 2007 the club hosted the Jacques Léglise Trophy for boys' team golf between Great Britain and Ireland and Continental Europe, the competition was won by Great Britain and Ireland by a margin of thirteen and a half points to ten and a half.

== See also ==
- List of golf courses in the United Kingdom
- Hollinwell and Annesley railway station
