= Emily Toy =

English professional golfer

Personal information
- Nationality: England
- Born: c. 1997

Career
- Sport: Golf
- Turned professional: 2022

Best results in LPGA major championships
- Chevron Championship: DNP
- Women's PGA C'ship: DNP
- U.S. Women's Open: CUT: 2020
- Women's British Open: CUT: 2019
- Evian Championship: CUT: 2019

Emily Toy (born c.1997) is an English professional golfer from Longdowns in Cornwall, winner of The Women's Amateur Championship in 2019.

== Golf career ==
In July 2015, aged 17, Toy won the English Girls' Open Amateur Stroke Play Championship at Sheringham Golf Club. In January 2019, she toured Australia with England Golf, and won the 36-hole qualifier for the Women's New South Wales Amateur. In June 2019, she beat New Zealand's Amelia Garvey to win the Women's Amateur Championship at the Royal County Down Golf Club. In 2019, she played in the Evian Championship and the Women's British Open but missed the cut on both occasions.

Toy turn professional at the start of 2022.

== Amateur wins ==
- 2015 English Girls' Open Amateur Stroke Play Championship
- 2017 R&A Foundation Scholars Tournament
- 2018 BUCS Golf Tour - English & Welsh Championships
- 2019 The Women's Amateur Championship

== Team appearances ==
Amateur

- Vagliano Trophy (representing Great Britain and Ireland): 2019
- European Ladies' Team Championship (representing England): 2019, 2021 (winners)
- Astor Trophy (representing Great Britain and Ireland): 2019
- Curtis Cup (representing Great Britain & Ireland): 2021
