= Boys Amateur Championship =

British golf tournament

Tournament information
- Location: United Kingdom
- Established: 1921
- Course: County Louth Golf Club (2025)
- Format: Stroke play followed by match play
- Month played: August

Current champion
- (Netherlands) Guus Lafeber

The Boys Amateur Championship is a golf tournament which is held annually in the United Kingdom. The competition is organised and run by The R&A.

== History ==
The Boys Amateur Championship was first played at Royal Ascot in 1921. In 1921 boys had to be under-16 but this was raised to under-17 in 1922 and to under-18 in 1923, which is the age limit that has been retained since.

The venue for the competition has been played at many golf courses throughout the United Kingdom and has frequented several golf courses on more than one occasion. Notably the first two completion were both played at Royal Ascot.

The first championship started on 5 September 1921 with nearly 50 boys competing. The first day saw 14-year-old Henry Cotton play the eventual winner, Donald Mathieson, Cotton losing by 2 holes. Cotton was all square after 16 holes but lost the 17th, after being incorrectly penalised for placing his bag in a bunker, and then went out of bounds at the final hole. The Scot, Mathieson, met an English boy, Guy Lintott in the 36-hole final. Lincott won the final three holes to tie the match but Mathieson won the 37th hole to win the championship. Mathieson was the son of Donald MacKay Mathieson, a well-known golf journalist.

== Format ==
The current format for the Boys Amateur Championship has been used since 2010 and comprises an initial stroke play stage with all 252 competitors playing two rounds of 18 holes, one on each of the two courses. The 64 lowest scores over the 36 holes then compete in the match play final stage of the Championship. Ties for 64th place are decided by countback. Each round of the knockout is played over 18 holes with the exception of the final which is played over 36 holes. Boys must be under 18 at the start of the year in which the championship is held.

The 2020 event was cancelled, while the 2021 event was run with a reduced field of 144 played at a single venue, Royal Cinque Ports.

== Results ==
Year	Winner	Score	Runner-up	Venue	Ref.
2026	(Iceland) Óliver Elí Björnsson	37 holes	(Sweden) Ludwig Libera	Gailes Links	
2025	(Netherlands) Guus Lafeber	37 holes	(Spain) Yago Horno	County Louth Golf Club	
2024	(Sweden) Viggo Olsson Mörk	4 & 3	(Netherlands) Scott Woltering	Moortown	
2023	(England) Kris Kim	38 holes	(United States) Alex Papayoanou	Ganton	
2022	(Sweden) Albert Hansson	2 & 1	(Sweden) Didrik Ringvall Bengtsson	Carnoustie	
2021	(England) Jack Bigham	37 holes	(Italy) Riccardo Fantinelli	Royal Cinque Ports	
2020	Cancelled				
2019	(France) Tom Gueant	37 holes	(Sweden) Wilmer Ederö	Saunton	
2018	(England) Conor Gough	3 & 1	(Spain) José Luis Ballester	Royal Portrush	
2017	(Portugal) Pedro Lencart	5 & 4	(Germany) Falko Hanisch	Nairn	
2016	(Germany) Falko Hanisch	37 holes	(Spain) Alejandro Aguilera	Muirfield	
2015	(Sweden) Marcus Svensson	4 & 3	(South Africa) Keegan De Lange	Royal Birkdale	
2014	(Sweden) Oskar Bergqvist	1 up	(Republic of Ireland) Rowan Lester	Prestwick	
2013	(Scotland) Ewen Ferguson	10 & 9	(Germany) Michael Hirmer	Royal Liverpool	
2012	(England) Matt Fitzpatrick	10 & 8	(Wales) Henry James	Notts	
2011	(England) Harrison Greenberry	37 holes	(England) Patrick Kelly	Burnham & Berrow	
2010	(Spain) Adrián Otaegui	4 & 3	(Germany) Max Rottluff	Kilmarnock (Barassie)	
2009	(England) Tom Lewis	5 & 4	(England) Eddie Pepperell	Royal St George's	
2008	(Portugal) Pedro Figueiredo	39 holes	(Scotland) Fraser McKenna	Little Aston	
2007	(Spain) Emilio Cuartero	1 up	(Scotland) Fraser Fotheringham	Royal Porthcawl	
2006	(England) Matthew Nixon	38 holes	(Sweden) Björn Åkesson	Royal Aberdeen	
2005	(Germany) Bernhard Neumann	3 & 2	(Scotland) Jordan Findlay	Hunstanton	
2004	(Scotland) Jordan Findlay	2 & 1	(England) Tom Sherreard	Conwy	
2003	(Wales) Rhys Davies	1 up	(Spain) Pablo Martín	Royal Liverpool	
2002	(England) Mark Pilling	37 holes	(Wales) Rhys Davies	Carnoustie	
2001	(Spain) Pablo Martín	3 & 2	(Spain) Rafa Cabrera-Bello	Ganton	
2000	(Scotland) David Inglis	1 up	(England) David Skinns	Hillside	
1999	(Spain) Alfonso Gutierrez	1 up	(England) Michael Skelton	Royal St David's	
1998	(Scotland) Steven O'Hara	1 up	(Italy) Stefano Reale	Ladybank	
1997	(Spain) Sergio García	6 & 5	(England) Richard Jones	Saunton	
1996	(England) Kenneth Ferrie	2 & 1	(Wales) Mark Pilkington	Littlestone	
1995	(Scotland) Steven Young	7 & 6	(England) Sam Walker	Dunbar	
1994	(England) Christopher Smith	2 & 1	(England) Chris Rodgers	Little Aston	
1993	(England) David Howell	3 & 1	(Sweden) Viktor Gustavsson	Glenbervie	
1992	(Sweden) Leif Westerberg	3 & 2	(Sweden) Freddie Jacobson	Royal Mid-Surrey	
1991	(Spain) Francisco Valera	4 & 3	(England) Robert Walton	Montrose	
1990	(England) Michael Welch	3 & 1	(Wales) Matthew Ellis	Hunstanton	
1989	(England) Carl Watts	5 & 3	(Scotland) Colin Fraser	Nairn	
1988	(England) Simon Pardoe	3 & 2	(England) David Haines	Formby	
1987	(Wales) Calvin O'Carroll	3 & 1	(Sweden) Per Olsson	Kilmarnock (Barassie)	
1986	(Republic of Ireland) Leslie Walker	5 & 4	(Scotland) Graham King	Seaton Carew	
1985	(England) James Cook	5 & 4	(England) Wayne Henry	Royal Burgess	
1984	(Scotland) Lee Vannet	2 & 1	(Sweden) Adam Mednick	Royal Porthcawl	
1983	(Spain) José María Olazábal	6 & 5	(France) Marc Pendariès	Glenbervie	
1982	(England) Mark Grieve	37 holes	(England) Giles Hickman	Burnham & Berrow	
1981	(Spain) Jesús López	4 & 3	(England) Reeves Weedon	Gullane	
1980	(England) Duncan Muscroft	7 & 6	(Wales) Aled Llyr	Formby	
1979	(Northern Ireland) Ronan Rafferty	6 & 5	(England) David Ray	Kilmarnock-Barassie	
1978	(England) Stephen Keppler	3 & 2	(England) Mark Stokes	Seaton Carew	
1977	(Scotland) Ian Ford	1 up	(Scotland) Colin Dalgleish	Downfield	
1976	(Wales) Mark Mouland	6 & 5	(England) Graham Hargreaves	Sunningdale	
1975	(Scotland) Brian Marchbank	1 up	(England) Sandy Lyle	Bruntsfield Links	
1974	(England) Toby Shannon	10 & 9	(England) Sandy Lyle	Royal Liverpool	
1973	(Scotland) David Robertson	5 & 3	(Italy) Stefano Betti	Blairgowrie	
1972	(Scotland) Garry Harvey	7 & 5	(England) Robert Newsome	Moortown	
1971	(England) Howard Clark	6 & 5	(Scotland) Garry Harvey	Kilmarnock-Barassie	
1970	(England) Ian Gradwell	1 up	(Scotland) Ewen Murray	Hillside	
1969	(England) Martin Foster	37 holes	(Scotland) Martin Gray	Dunbar	
1968	(England) Stephen Evans	3 & 2	(Wales) Kim Dabson	Royal Lytham & St Anne's	
1967	(England) Peter Tupling	4 & 2	(England) Stephen Evans	Western Galies	
1966	(England) Andrew Phillips	12 & 11	(England) Alan Muller	Moortown	
1965	(Scotland) Graham Milne	4 & 2	(England) David Midgley	Gullane	
1964	(England) Peter Townsend	9 & 8	(Scotland) Roddy Gray	Formby	
1963	(Scotland) Alex Soutar	2 & 1	(England) David Rigby	Prestwick	
1962	(England) Peter Townsend	1 up	(Scotland) Cameron Penman	Royal Mid-Surrey	
1961	(Scotland) Finlay Morris	3 & 2	(England) Clive Clark	Dalmahoy	
1960	(France) Patrick Cros	5 & 3	(England) Peter Green	Olton	
1959	(Scotland) Alan Murphy	3 & 1	(Scotland) Eddie Shamash	Pollok	
1958	(England) Richard Braddon	4 & 3	(England) Ian Stungo	Moortown	
1957	(Isle of Man) David Ball	2 & 1	(Scotland) John Wilson	Carnoustie	
1956	(Scotland) John Ferguson	2 & 1	(England) Clive Cole	Sunningdale	
1955	(Scotland) Stewart Wilson	39 holes	(Scotland) Brian Aitken	Kilmarnock (Barassie)	
1954	(Scotland) Alan Bussell	38 holes	(England) Keith Warren	Royal Liverpool	
1953	(England) Alec Shepperson	6 & 4	(England) Tom Booth	Dunbar	
1952	(England) Michael Bonallack	37 holes	(England) Alec Shepperson	Formby	
1951	(England) Neville Dunn	6 & 5	(England) Michael Lunt	Prestwick	
1950	(Northern Ireland) John Glover	2 & 1	(Scotland) Ian Young	Royal Lytham & St Anne's	
1949	(Scotland) Harry MacAnespie	3 & 2	(Northern Ireland) Norman Drew	St Andrews	
1948	(England) John Pritchett	37 holes	(Scotland) David Reid	Kilmarnock (Barassie)	
1947	(Scotland) James Armour	5 & 4	(England) Ian Caldwell	Royal Liverpool	
1946	(Scotland) Alan MacGregor	7 & 5	(England) Donald Dunstan	Bruntsfield Links	
1940–1945: No tournament due to World War II
1939	(Scotland) Sandy Williamson	4 & 2	(England) Ken Thom	Carnoustie	
1938	(Scotland) Willie Smeaton	3 & 2	(England) Thomas Snowball	Moor Park	
1937	(Scotland) Ian Roberts	8 & 7	(Scotland) James Stewart	Bruntsfield Links	
1936	(Republic of Ireland) Jimmy Bruen	11 & 9	(Scotland) William Innes	Royal Birkdale	
1935	(England) John Langley	6 & 5	(England) Ralph Norris	Royal Aberdeen	
1934	(England) Robert Burles	12 & 10	(England) Frederick Allpass	Moortown	
1933	(England) Laddie Lucas	3 & 2	(Scotland) William McLachlan	Carnoustie	
1932	(Scotland) Ian MacDonald	2 & 1	(Scotland) Leslie Hardie	Royal Lytham & St Anne's	
1931	(Scotland) Hector Thomson	5 & 4	(Scotland) Francis McGloin	Glasgow	
1930	(Scotland) James Lindsay	9 & 8	(Scotland) James Todd	Fulwell	
1929	(Scotland) James Lindsay	6 & 4	(Scotland) John Scott-Riddell	Royal Burgess	
1928	(United States) Stuart Scheftel	6 & 5	(Scotland) Archibald Dobbie	Formby	
1927	(England) Eric Fiddian	4 & 2	(Scotland) Ken Forbes	Royal Burgess	
1926	(Scotland) Eric McRuvie	1 up	(England) Charles Timmis	Coombe Hill	
1925	(Scotland) Robert Peattie	4 & 3	(Scotland) Andrew McNair	Royal Burgess	
1924	(Scotland) Robert Peattie	2 up	(France) Pierre Maneuvrier	Coombe Hill	
1923	(Scotland) Donald Mathieson	3 & 1	(England) Hugh Mitchell	Dunbar	
1922	(England) Hugh Mitchell	4 & 2	(England) William Greenfield	Royal Ascot	
1921	(Scotland) Donald Mathieson	37 holes	(England) Guy Lintott	Royal Ascot	

== Future venues ==
- 2027 - Prince's Golf Club
