= Burnham & Berrow Golf Club =

Golf club in Somerset, England

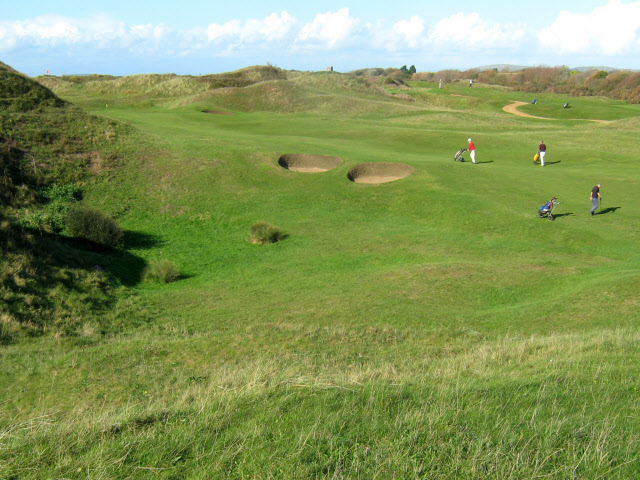

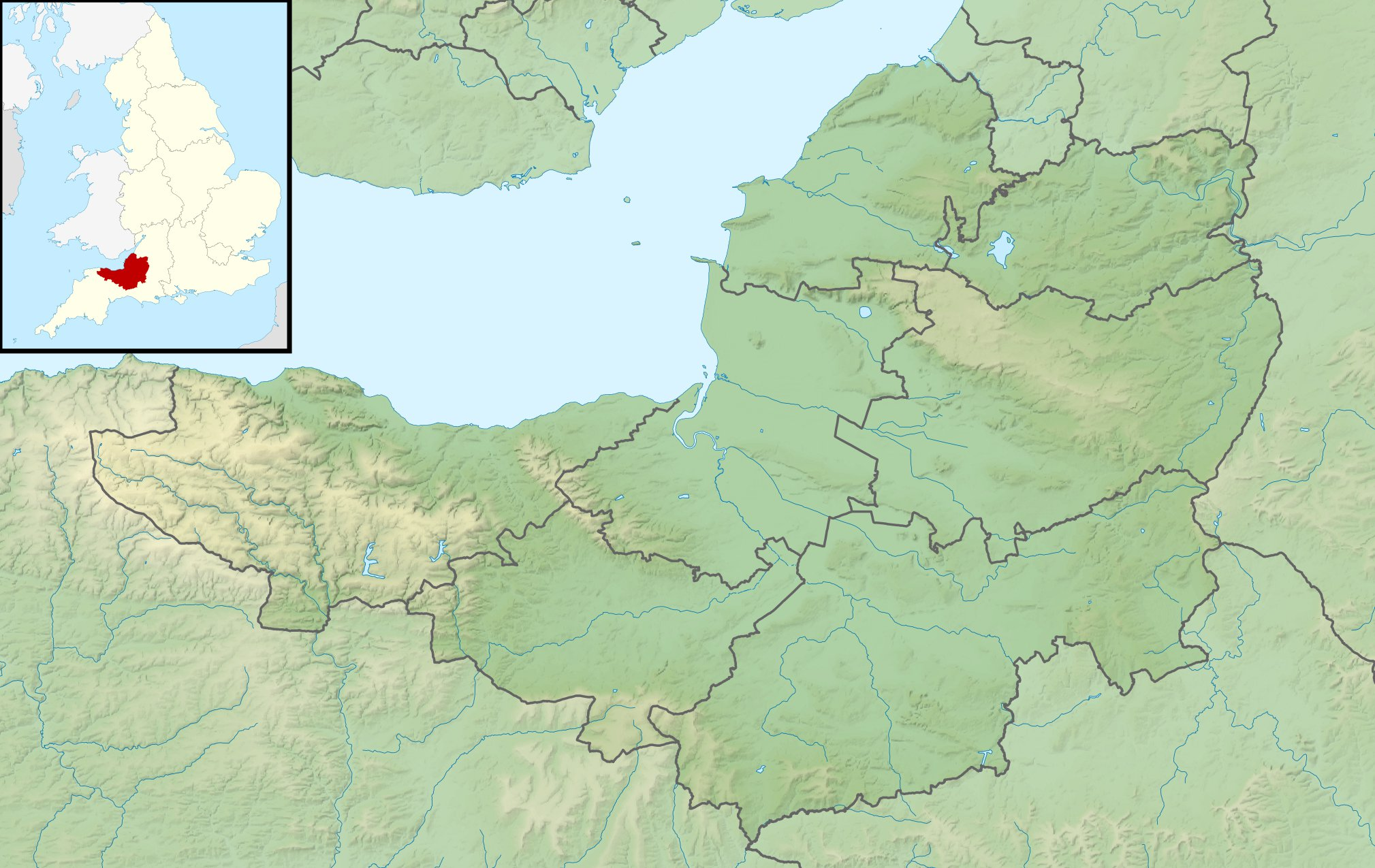
- Location in Somerset Location in England
- 51°15′07″N 3°00′10″W

Club information
- Location: Burnham on Sea, Somerset, England
- Established: 1891
- Type: Private
- Tota holes: 27
- Tournaments: Brabazon Trophy, British Ladies Amateur Golf Championship, English Amateur; Boys Amateur Championship; Jacques Léglise Trophy; West of England Open Amateur Championship
- Website: http://burnhamandberrowgolfclub.co.uk

Championship
- Designed by: William Herbert Fowler and Harry Colt
- Par: 71
- Length: 6,925 yards (6,332 m)

Channel
- Designed by: Fred Hawtree
- Par: 70
- Length: 5,818 yards (5,320 m)

Burnham & Berrow Golf Club is a 27-hole members golf club in Somerset, England which has hosted many of the leading amateur golf tournaments in Britain, including the Brabazon Trophy and English Amateur.

== History ==
The club was first opened as Burnham Golf Club on a 9-hole layout designed by Charles Gibson, however the club was extended to an 18-hole layout by William Herbert Fowler by 1910 and was renamed to its current name of Burnham & Berrow Golf Club. Even in its early years the course began to host high-level amateur tournaments hosting the British Ladies Amateur Golf Championship in 1906.

In 1913 a further redesign of the course was made by Harry Colt which redesigned the course into much of the layout that currently still stands, the work on this redesign was completed in 1923. Following the redesigns the club would go on to host the British Ladies Amateur Golf Championship again in 1923 and 1938 and the 1930 English Amateur.

The first professional at the club was John Henry Taylor, who would later go on to win 5 Open Championships and captain Great Britain at the 1933 Ryder Cup.

Following World War II the golf club struggled financially and was forced to sell some land and redesign several holes as a result. However, despite these difficulties it continued to attract some of Britain's top amateur competitions, including the 1956 Brabazon Trophy and the English Amateur in 1952, 1963 and 1971.

Having recovered financially, the 9-hole Channel course was designed by Fred Hawtree and built in 1977, bringing the total number of holes available to members up to the present-day number of 27.

In more recent years the championship course has continued to host several top amateur competitions. It has hosted the Brabazon Trophy a further 2 times in 1990 and 2006 and the English Amateur a further 2 times in 1981 and 2006. The championship course has also hosted to 1999 Jacques Léglise Trophy and the 2011 Boys Amateur Championship (alongside Enmore Park Golf Club) at Junior level.

== Courses and scorecards ==
=== Championship course ===
The championship course is a full 18-hole links course and is the course on which all of the major competitions hosted by the club have been played. The scorecard for the championship course is as follows (all distances given in yards):

Championship Course
Tee	Rating/Slope	1	2	3	4	5	6	7	8	9	Out	10	11	12	13	14	15	16	17	18	In	Total
Par		4	4	4	5	3	4	4	5	3	36	4	4	4	5	3	4	4	3	4	35	71
SI	Men's	7	3	9	11	15	5	1	13	17		16	2	6	10	14	4	18	12	8
Blue	74	380	421	376	511	195	434	450	528	170	3465	395	438	401	558	192	469	362	200	445	3460	6925
White	73	380	393	376	495	158	398	450	490	170	3310	375	419	401	544	180	440	344	200	445	3348	6658
Yellow	72	369	386	350	485	146	390	444	465	155	3190	362	410	385	530	168	436	335	179	441	3246	6436
Par		5	4	4	5	3	4	5	5	3	38	4	4	4	5	3	4	4	3	4	36	74
SI	Women's	15	2	6	14	10	4	12	8	18		9	3	7	1	16	11	5	13	17
Red	74	371	367	329	421	134	339	415	456	125	2957	320	377	331	474	120	324	314	140	387	2787	5744

=== Channel Course ===
The Channel Course is an 18-hole course with nine greens. Each hole has 2 separate tee positions, one of which is used on each loop of nine. The course is a 5,819-yard par-70 off the men's white tees and a 5,038-yard par-70 of the women's tees.

== Competitions hosted ==
=== English Men's Open Amateur Stroke Play Championship (Brabazon Trophy) ===
The club has hosted the English Men's Open Amateur Stroke Play Championship for the Brabazon Trophy on 3 occasions, with the following results:

No	Year	Winner(s)	Score
1	1956	Stan Fox	292
2	1990	(England) Gary Evans (France) Olivier Edmond	287 (tie)
3	2011	(England) Neil Raymond	287

=== English Amateur ===
The club has hosted the English Amateur on 6 occasions with the following results:

No	Year	Winner	Runner-up	Score
1	1930	Dale Bourn	C. E. Hardman	3 & 2
2	1952	Bunny Millward	Terry Shorrock	2 holes
3	1963	Michael Bonallack	Alan Thirlwell	4 & 3
4	1971	Warren Humphreys	John Davies	9 & 8
5	1981	David Blakeman	A. K. Stubbs	3 & 1
6	2006	Ross McGowan	Oliver Fisher	5 & 4

=== British Ladies Amateur Golf Championship ===
The club has hosted the British Ladies Amateur Golf Championship on 3 occasions, with the following results:

No	Year	Winner	Runner-up	Score
1	1906	(England) Alice Kennion	(England) Bertha Thompson	4 & 3
2	1923	(England) Doris Chambers	(England) Muriel Dodd Macbeth	2 holes
3	1938	(Scotland) Helen Holm	(England) Elsie Corlett	4 & 3

=== Jacques Léglise Trophy ===
The club hosted the Jacques Léglise Trophy amateur boys' team golf competition between Great Britain and Ireland and the Continent of Europe in 1999 with Great Britain and Ireland winning 15 points to 9.

=== Boys Amateur Championship ===
Burnham & Berrow has twice hosted the Boys Amateur Championship, with the following results

No	Year	Co-host	Champion	Runner-up
1	1982		Mark Grieve	Giles Hickman
2	2011	Enmore Park Golf Club	Harrison Greenberry	Patrick Kelly

=== West of England Open Amateur Championship ===
The club annually hosts the West of England Open Amateur Championship, which is traditionally played in September and attracts many of the top amateur golfers from the region. It is now a world-ranking event, and boasts several recognizable names on the famous trophy.

== See also ==
- List of golf courses in the United Kingdom
