= Hunstanton Golf Club =

Golf club in Norfolk, England

- Location in England
- 52.955826°N 0.507903°E

Club information
- Location: Old Hunstanton, Norfolk, England
- Established: 1891
- Type: Private
- Tota holes: 18
- Tournaments: Brabazon Trophy, British Ladies Amateur, English Amateur, Boys Amateur Championship
- Website: http://www.hunstantongolfclub.com
- Designed by: James Braid
- Par: 72
- Length: 6,741 yards (6,164 m)

Hunstanton Golf Club is an 18-hole members golf club in Norfolk, England which has hosted many of the leading amateur golf tournaments in Britain including the Brabazon Trophy and English Amateur.

== History ==
The course was first designed in 1891 and was significantly altered in 1907 with the addition of 40 bunkers following designs by James Braid. The club hosted its first senior amateur event hosting the British Ladies Amateur Golf Championship in 1914, and the English Ladies Open in 1922. Following this the club hosted the English Amateur for the first time in 1931.

Further changes were made to the course in 1950 with several of the holes being redesigned to their present format, most notably there were significant changes to the closing two holes. Following this the course continued to host British amateur tournaments, it hosted the English Amateur again in 1960 and the Brabazon Trophy for the first time in 1966. In total the club has hosted the Brabazon Trophy on five occasions and the English Amateur on four occasions as well as six Women's Amateur Championships and two Boys Amateur Championships.

== Scorecard ==
| Tee | Rating/Slope | 1 | 2 | 3 | 4 | 5 | 6 | 7 | 8 | 9 | Out | 10 | 11 | 12 | 13 | 14 | 15 | 16 | 17 | 18 | In | Total |
| Par | | 4 | 5 | 4 | 3 | 4 | 4 | 3 | 5 | 5 | 37 | 4 | 4 | 4 | 4 | 3 | 5 | 3 | 4 | 4 | 35 | 72 |
| SI | Men's | 15 | 7 | 1 | 17 | 5 | 9 | 13 | 11 | 3 | | 10 | 2 | 16 | 6 | 18 | 8 | 14 | 4 | 12 |
| White | 73 | 342 | 534 | 445 | 171 | 425 | 336 | 167 | 509 | 514 | 3443 | 381 | 444 | 361 | 386 | 219 | 472 | 189 | 447 | 399 | 3298 | 6741 |
| Yellow | 72 | 324 | 523 | 425 | 155 | 422 | 299 | 152 | 489 | 480 | 3269 | 367 | 401 | 338 | 372 | 212 | 454 | 159 | 430 | 366 | 3099 | 6368 |
| Par | | 4 | 5 | 4 | 3 | 5 | 4 | 3 | 5 | 5 | 38 | 4 | 5 | 4 | 4 | 3 | 5 | 3 | 5 | 4 | 37 | 75 |
| SI | Women's | 15 | 7 | 3 | 17 | 9 | 5 | 13 | 1 | 11 | | 8 | 16 | 10 | 4 | 14 | 2 | 18 | 6 | 12 |
| Red | 76 | 309 | 509 | 395 | 143 | 418 | 279 | 131 | 454 | 428 | 3066 | 357 | 389 | 322 | 343 | 208 | 442 | 130 | 409 | 355 | 2955 | 6021 |

== Competitions hosted ==
=== English Men's Open Amateur Stroke Play Championship (Brabazon Trophy) ===
The club has hosted the English Men's Open Amateur Stroke Play Championship for the Brabazon Trophy on 5 occasions with the following results:

| No | Year | Winner(s) | Score |
|---|---|---|---|
| 1 | 1966 | (England) Peter Townsend | 282 |
| 2 | 1973 | Roger Revell | 294 |
| 3 | 1980 | (England) Peter McEvoy (Northern Ireland) Ronan Rafferty | 293 (tie) |
| 4 | 1991 | (England) Gary Evans (England) Mark Pullan | 284 (tie) |
| 5 | 2003 | (England) Jon Lupton | 287 |

=== English Amateur ===
The club has hosted the English Amateur on 4 occasions with the following results:

| No | Year | Winner | Runner-up | Score |
|---|---|---|---|---|
| 1 | 1931 | Leonard Crawley | Bill Sutton | 1 hole |
| 2 | 1951 | Geoffrey Roberts | H. Bennett | 39th hole |
| 3 | 1960 | Doug Sewell | Martin Christmas | 41st hole |
| 4 | 1995 | Mark Foster | Sam Jarman | 6 & 5 |

=== The Women's Amateur Championship ===
The club has hosted The Women's Amateur Championship (formerly known as the British Ladies Amateur Golf Championship) on six occasions, the results of which are as follows:

| No | Year | Winner | Country | Score | Runner-up |
|---|---|---|---|---|---|
| 1 | 1914 | Cecil Leitch | England | 2 & 1 | (England) Gladys Ravenscroft |
| 2 | 1928 | Manette le Blan | France | 3 & 2 | (England) Sylvia Marshall |
| 3 | 1946 | Jean Hetherington | England | 1 up | (Republic of Ireland) Philomena Garvey |
| 4 | 1958 | Jessie Valentine | Scotland | 1 up | (England) Elizabeth Price |
| 5 | 1972 | Mickey Walker | England | 2 up | (France) Claudine Clos-Rubin |
| 6 | 2022 | Jess Baker | England | 4 & 3 | (Sweden) Louise Rydqvist |

=== Boys Amateur Championship ===
The club has twice hosted the Boys Amateur Championship with the following results:

| No | Year | Champion | Runner-up |
|---|---|---|---|
| 1 | 1990 | Michael Welch | Matthew Ellis |
| 2 | 2005 | Bernhard Neumann | Jordan Findlay |

== See also ==
List of golf courses in the United Kingdom
