= Edith Orr =

English amateur golfer

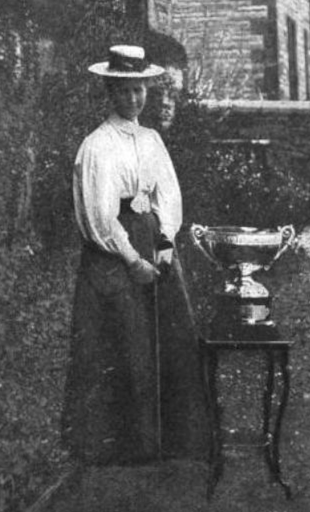
- In The Sketch, 7 July 1897

Personal information
- Full name: Edith Constance Orr
- Nationality: Scotland
- Born: 19 September 1870 Glasgow, Scotland
- Died: 19 February 1955 (aged 84) North Berwick, East Lothian, Scotland

Career
- Sport: Golf
- Status: Amateur

Edith Constance Orr (19 September 1870 – 19 February 1955) was a Scottish amateur golfer. She won the Women's Amateur Championship at Gullane in 1897, beating her sister Theodora in the final.

== Golf career ==
In 1897, the Women's Amateur Championship was held in Scotland for the first time, at Gullane. There were 102 entries including 35 from Scotland. Orr won her first two matches 9&7 and 8&7 and then had 3&2 win over Miss Phillips from Royal Eastbourne. In the fourth round she beat Mrs Murray 3&2 and then had a 9&7 win over Blanche Anderson in the quarter-finals. On the final day, Orr beat Maud Titterton by two holes in the semi-finals and then met her sister Theodora in the final, winning 4&3.

== Personal life ==
Orr was born in September 1870 at 21 Woodside Terrace, Glasgow, the daughter of John Orr, a thread manufacturer, and his wife Frances Bethia née Adam. John Orr died in February 1887. Frances Orr died in May 1913. Her older sister Theodora died suddenly in Edinburgh in October 1914. Edith Orr died, unmarried, in February 1955.
