= Elsie Grant Suttie =

Scottish golfer (1879–1954)

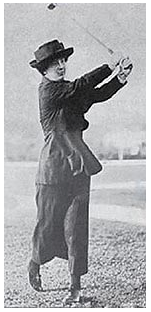
- Suttie, c. 1905

Personal information
- Full name: Elsie Grant Suttie
- Nationality: Scotland
- Born: 1879 London, England
- Died: 4 January 1954 (aged 74–75) North Berwick, Scotland

Career
- Sport: Golf
- Status: Amateur

Elsie Grant Suttie (1879 – 4 January 1954) was a Scottish amateur golfer who played in the late 19th century into the mid-20th century. In 1910, Suttie won the British Ladies Amateur Golf Championship at Westward Ho! – played on the Royal North Devon Golf Club course – defeating 18-year-old Lily Moore from Olton Golf Club in the West Midlands 6 and 4 in the final.

She also won the Scottish Ladies' Amateur Championship in 1911 and 1925.

== Early life ==
Suttie was born in 1879 in London, England, the daughter of Captain Francis Grant Suttie, R.N., and Elizabeth MacIntryre. Her father was the second son of Sir George Grant Suttie of Balgone. Elsie resided with her parents at Hyndford House, Fidra Road, North Berwick.

== Golf career ==
Suttie was selected to play for the Home Internationals team six times between 1908 and 1923. She learned her golf at North Berwick and Sunningdale and played most of her early golf with male members of the North Berwick club.

She won the Lord Shand scratch medal at Biarritz in 1910. That same year she was victorious in the British Ladies Amateur Golf Championship contested at the Royal North Devon Golf Club course in Westward Ho! She beat Lily Moore 6 and 4 to take the title. In 1911, Suttie met Dorothy Campbell in the finals of the British Ladies at Portrush but lost that match. Later that year, she won the Scottish Ladies' Amateur Championship, beating Ida Kyle from St Andrews 1 up on Kyle's home course. Suttie won the scratch prize in 1922 at Highgate and, in 1924, still maintained a plus one handicap. In June 1925, she reached the final of the Scottish Ladies' Amateur Championship at Gullane, losing by one hole to Gertrude Percy.

== Death ==
By the early 1950s, she was living at Garage House at Marly Knowe in Windgates Road, North Berwick. She was found dead in her home on 4 January 1954, aged 74 years.
