= The Women's Amateur Championship =

Golf tournament

Tournament information
- Location: United Kingdom
- Established: 1893
- Organised by: The R&A
- Format: Stroke play and match play
- Month played: June

Current champion
- (France) Valentine Delon

The Women's Amateur Championship, previously known as the Ladies' British Open Amateur Championship, was founded in 1893 by the Ladies' Golf Union. It is organised by The R&A, which merged with the Ladies' Golf Union in 2017. Until the dawn of the professional era in 1976, it was the most important golf tournament for women in Great Britain, and attracted players from continental Europe, North America, and the rest of the world. Along with the U.S. Women's Amateur, it is considered the highest honour in women's amateur golf.

The first tournament was played at the Lytham & St Annes Golf Club in Lytham St Annes in Lancashire, England and was won by Lady Margaret Scott, who also won the following two years; her feat of three straight titles remains the record, matched by Cecil Leitch and Enid Wilson. In 1927, Simone de la Chaume of France, who had won the 1924 British Girls Amateur Golf Championship, became the first golfer from outside the British Isles to win the Ladies Championship. The first competitor from the United States to win the title was Babe Zaharias in 1947.

== Format ==
The championship is contested in two phases. It begins with a 36-hole stroke play competition, played over two days. The leading 64 competitors progress to the knock-out match play competition, ties for 64th place being decided by countback. From 1966 up to 2020, all matches in the knock-out phase were played over 18 holes, but from 2021 the final has been played over 36 holes.

== Prizes ==
The "Pam Barton Memorial Salver" is awarded to the winner to be held for one year, as the actual Championship Cup is held by the Ladies' Golf Union. The runner-up receives The Diana Fishwick Cup. The leading qualifier receives the Doris Chambers Trophy. If two or more players are tied, the result is decided on countback, the player with the lowest second round score being the winner.

== History ==
=== Pre-World War I ===
In late 1892 several members of Wimbledon Ladies Golf Club contacted other ladies' clubs, in hopes of forming a ladies' golf union and holding a ladies' championship. The men's Amateur Championship had been held since 1885. Independently the Lytham & St Annes Golf Club, who had not been sent the circular, also decided to organise a ladies' championship.

The two clubs combined their efforts in the Ladies' Golf Union, holding their first championship from Tuesday 13 to Thursday 15 June 1893 on the ladies' links of the Lytham & St Annes Golf Club, a 9-hole course, then at Mayfield Road. There were 38 entries, requiring 6 knock-out rounds. Two rounds were played per day with the semi-finals and final played on the Thursday. All matches were over 18 holes, with extra holes played to ensure a result. The winner received a championship cup valued at 50 guineas, and a gold medal. The runner-up received a silver medal, and the other semi-finalists received bronze medals. Lady Margaret Scott beat Issette Pearson in the final by a score of 7&5.

The 1894 championship was held in May at Littlestone-on-Sea in Kent. May became the regular month for the championship to be held, although sometimes it was held in early June. The event was extended to the Friday, with the quarter-finals and semi-finals played on the Thursday. The finalists were the same as in 1893, with Lady Margaret Scott winning again, but by a closer margin of 3&2.

In 1895 the event was played at Royal Portrush. The semi-finals and final were played on the Friday, a format that was retained until the introduction of a 36-hole final in 1913. Lady Margaret Scott won for the third time, beating Emma Lythgoe 5&4 in the final. The 1896 event at Hoylake produced a new winner, Amy Pascoe. In 1897 the championship was held in Scotland for the first time, at Gullane. It produced the first Scottish winner, with the final between two sisters, Edith Orr beating Theodora 4&3. The 1898 event at Great Yarmouth & Caister was won by Lena Thomson, the losing finalist in 1896. She beat Elinor Nevile 6&5 in the final.

From 1899 to 1907 the championship was dominated by Irish women. May Hezlet won in 1899, 1902 and 1907 with Rhona Adair winning in 1900 and 1903. Four other Irish golfers were losing finalists, Jessie Magill in 1899, Florence Walker-Leigh in 1903, Maud Stuart in 1905 and Florence Hezlet, May's sister, in 1907. The 1899 event was held at County Down. May Hezlet met Magill in the final. Magill had previously defeated Hezlet during the 1898 final of the Irish Women's Amateur Close Championship, but on this occasion May Hezlet had won the close championship the previous week and she repeated her success, winning 2&1. She was less than two weeks past her 17th birthday.

Rhona Adair won the following year at Westward Ho!, beating Isabel Nevile 6&5 in the final. The 1901 championship was held in Aberdovey in Wales, and was won by Molly Graham who beat Adair in the final. May Hezlet won for the second time in 1902, beating Elinor Nevile at the 20th hole. Nevile was the sister of the 1900 runner-up Isabel Nevile. Grace Park, the wife of Mungo Park Jr. was one of the semi-finalists. There were three Irish semi-finalists for the 1903 championship at County Down. Adair won for the second time.

May Hezlet reached the final again in 1904 at Troon and met Lottie Dod. Dod was better known as a tennis player, having won the Wimbledon ladies' singles championship five times between 1887 and 1893. She had reached the semi-finals in 1898 and 1899 but this was her first final. In a close match Dod won by one hole.

In 1905, at Royal Cromer, another Irish golfer, Maud Stuart, reached the final but lost 3&2 to Bertha Thompson. 1906 was the first final since 1898 without an Irish lady. Thompson reached the final again but lost 4&3 to Alice Kennion, the first married woman to win the championship. The 1907 championship was played at County Down and three Irish women reached the semi-finals. May Hezlet won for the third time, beating her sister Florence Hezlet 2&1 in the final.

The 1908 championship was played on the Old Course at St Andrews. Maud Titterton met Dorothy Campbell in the final. It was the first final for both players, although both players had previously reached the semi-finals, Titterton in 1897 and Campbell in 1904, 1905 and 1906. Titterton won a close match at the 19th hole. The start of the final was delayed because Campbell had not won her semi-final until the 22nd hole.

Campbell won her first championship in 1909, beating Florence Hezlet 4&3 in the final at Birkdale. None of the four semi-finalists at Westward Ho! in 1910 had reached that stage before. Elsie Grant Suttie won the title. Campbell reached the final again in 1911 at Royal Portrush, meeting Violet Hezlet, the third of the Hezlet sisters to reach the final. Campbell won the match 3&2, winning her second championship. The 1912 championship at Turnberry was won by Gladys Ravenscroft who beat Stella Temple 3&2 in the final.

In 1913 the final at Lytham & St Annes was extended to 36-holes. It was played on a Friday, with the quarter and semi-finals played on the previous day. Canadian Violet Pooley was one of the semi-finalists. Muriel Dodd beat Evelyn Chubb in the final. Dodd won five holes in a row from the 4th to the 8th holes of the morning round and eventually won 8&6. Dodd was beaten in the semi-finals of the 1914 championship at Hunstanton. The final was between Cecil Leitch and Gladys Ravenscroft. Ravenscroft had beaten Leitch in the semi-finals in 1912, but on this occasion Leitch won a close match 2&1, the morning round having finished all-square.

=== Inter-war period ===
A championship was planned for October 1919 at Burnham & Berrow but was cancelled because of a railway strike. The first post World War I championship was played at Royal County Down in May 1920. Cecil Leitch, the defending champion from 1914, met Molly Griffiths in the final. Leitch was 6 holes up after the morning round and won 7&6.

Joyce Wethered made her first appearance at Turnberry in 1921. She and Leitch would dominate the event in the 1920s, meeting in the final in 1921, 1922 and 1925. They had also met in the final of the 1920 English Women's Amateur Championship, with Wethered winning. In the 1921 Women's Amateur Championship, the result was reversed. Leitch was 8 up with 9 holes to play and, although Wethered then won four holes in a row, Leitch won the match 4&3.

When the pair met again in 1922 at Prince's, the morning round was close, with Wethered a hole ahead. However she dominated in the afternoon, eventually winning 9&7. In 1923 Leitch was injured and Wethered was beaten in the semi-finals, leaving a final between Doris Chambers and Muriel Macbeth. In the final, Macbeth was 3 up after the morning round but Chambers won the match at the 36th hole.

In 1924, at Royal Portrush, Wethered and Leitch met in quarter-finals. Wethered won 6&4 and went on to win her second title. At Troon in 1925, Wethered and Leitch met in the final for the third time. The match was level after 18 holes and still level after 27. Wethered then took a two-hole lead before Leitch won the last holes to level the match. The match ended at the 37th hole with Wethered winning her third championship.

The 1926 championship was due to be played in Harlech in May, but was postponed because of the general strike. The event was rearranged to June, although the Women's Home Internationals, which generally preceded the championship, were cancelled. Joyce Wethered did not enter and Cecil Leitch won, the first woman to win the event four times. A large number of the original entrants scratched, and the final was played a day earlier than usual, on a Thursday.

Simone de la Chaume won the championship in 1927, the first French woman to do so. She had been a semi-finalist in 1926 and was also the first French winner of the Girls Amateur Championship, in 1924. There was another French winner in 1928 when Manette le Blan won the title.

The 1929 championship was played on the Old Course at St Andrews. Wethered came out of retirement to play and met the American, Glenna Collett, in the final. Collett had already won the U.S. Women's Amateur three times. The final created great public interest. After 9 holes Collett led by 5 but her lead was reduced to 2 after the morning round. Wethered then won 7 of the first 9 holes in the afternoon to be 4 up and eventually won 3&1, her fourth win in the championship.

Collett reached the final again at Formby in 1930 and met Diana Fishwick in the final. Fishwick was competing in the event for the first time, although she had won the Girls Amateur Championship in 1927 and 1928. Fishwick led by 5 after the first round and eventually won 4&3.

The format was changed at Portmarnock in 1931, with the introduction of stroke-play qualifying. Two rounds were played, on Saturday and Monday, with the leading 64 advancing to the match-play stage, which took place from Tuesday to Friday. Enid Wilson led the qualifying by 8 strokes, after rounds of 75 and 83, with Wanda Morgan in second place. The two met in the final with Wilson winning 7&6. Wilson had been a semi-finalist three times previously and had won the English title in 1928 and 1930.

In 1932 at Saunton the qualifying days were changed to Friday and Saturday with the match-play played from Monday to Thursday. An American Maureen Orcutt led the qualifying with Wilson three strokes behind. Orcutt was beaten in the first round: Wilson defeated another American Leona Cheney in the semi-finals and retained the championship, winning by a score of 7&6. In 1933 at Gleneagles, Wilson won the title for the third year in succession, having beaten Doris Park, in the semi-finals.

The 1934 championship at Royal Porthcawl produced two new finalists with Helen Holm beating Pam Barton in the final. Enid Wilson had been excluded from the event as she was deemed to have lost her amateur status.

In 1935, Pam Barton reached the final again, beating her sister Mervyn in the semi-finals, but lost, this time to Wanda Morgan. In 1936 Bridget Newell led the qualifying and reached the final where she met Pam Barton. Barton won the final 7&5 to win her first championship. The 1937 championship was played at Turnberry. Bridget Newell had died just before the event, causing the Home Internationals to be cancelled. However, the championship continued as normal. There had been a reduction in the number of entries and qualifying was dropped, the event returning to the earlier Monday to Friday dates. There was all-Scottish final, Jessie Anderson beating Doris Park 6&4. Another Scot, Helen Holm, won for the second time in 1938. Pam Barton won her second title in 1939 beating Jean Marks in the final at Royal Portrush.

=== Post-World War II ===
The championship resumed at Hunstanton in 1946 but was not played until late in the year, finishing in early October. It was won by Jean Hetherington who beat Philomena Garvey in a close final. The 1947 event was held in June and was won by Babe Zaharias, the first American winner. There was an all-American semi-final in 1948 with Louise Suggs beating Dorothy Kielty and winning the title the following day.

Frances Stephens won in 1949, beating Garvey in the semi-finals and another Irish woman, Clarrie Reddan, in the final. Stephens reached four finals in six years from 1949 to 1954, winning again in 1954 but losing in 1951 and 1952. The Vicomtesse de St Sauveur, Lally Segard, won in 1950 beating Jessie Valentine, the 1937 champion, in the final. 1950 also saw the first Australian semi-finalist, Judith Percy.

The 1951 championship was won by Kitty MacCann, the first Irish winner since 1907, while Moira Paterson won in 1952. Garvey reached the final again in 1953 but lost to the Canadian Marlene Stewart. Stewart reached the semi-finals the following year, 1954, but lost to Stephens at the 22nd hole. Stephens went on to win the title.

Jessie Valentine won for the second time in 1955, 18 years after her first success, beating Barbara Romack in the final. There were three American semi-finalists in 1956, and all-American final, with Wiffi Smith beating Mary Patton Janssen. Philomena Garvey beat Valentine in the 1957 final, having twice lost in the final previously. Valentine reached the final again in 1958, her third appearance in four years, and won the title for the third time. Elizabeth Price won in 1959, having previously lost two finals.

As in 1956, there were three American semi-finalists in 1960. Barbara McIntire beat Garvey in the final. Marley Spearman won in 1961 and repeated her success in 1962, becoming the first woman to successfully defend the title since Enid Wilson in 1933. From 1962 to 1966 the championship was played in late September or early October, returning to June from 1967.

French women had considerable success in the 1960s. Brigitte Varangot won in 1963, 1965 and 1968 while Catherine Lacoste won in 1969. In addition Claudine Cros-Rubin reached the final in 1968 and was a losing semi-finalist three times, in 1961, 1963 and 1965. The American Carol Sorenson won in 1964, beating Bridget Jackson at the 37th hole. Liz Chadwick won successive titles in 1966 and 1967, matching Marley Spearman's achievement in 1961 and 1962. In 1965 the championship finished in early October. The final was reduced from 36 to 18 holes. It was the first 18-hole final since 1912.

Qualifying was reintroduced in 1966, for the first time since the 1930s. 36 holes were played on the Tuesday and Wednesday with the match-play on Thursday to Saturday. Originally it was intended that 64 players would qualify, but with the prospect of early morning fog, this was reduced to 32. The match-play draw was seeded.

There were also 32 qualifiers in 1967, the final remaining at 18 holes even though it was the only match on the final day. In 1968, bad weather reduced the qualifying to one round and, as a result, the number of qualifiers was increased to 64. Lacoste led the qualifying in three of the first four years, 1966, 1967 and 1969, and went on to win the championship in 1969.

In 1970, Dinah Oxley repeated Catherine Lacoste's achievement in 1969, leading the qualifying and then winning the championship, beating Belle Robertson in the final, Robertson's third loss in a final. Beverly Huke nearly repeated the feat in 1971 but lost in the final to Mickey Walker. At Hunstanton in 1972 the number of qualifiers was increased to 64, with the semi-final and final played on the same day. Walker retained her title beating Claudine Cros-Rubin in the final. The number of qualifiers returned to 32 in 1973. Walker reached the final for the third successive year but lost to Ann Irvin. The 1974 and 1975 championships were won by Americans, Carol Semple and Nancy Roth Syms. There were 64 qualifiers in 1975 but the number again returned to 32, from 1976. In 1976, Alison Sheard was the first South African to reached the final, but she lost to Cathy Panton, the first Scottish winner for 18 years. Angela Uzielli won in 1977 while Edwina Kennedy was the first Australian winner in 1978. Kennedy led the qualifying in 1979 but lost to another Australian, Jane Lock in the semi-finals. Lock was beaten by Maureen Madill in the final.

Anne Quast Sander won in 1980 beating Liv Wollin in the final. In 1981 Belle Robertson led the qualifying and went on to win the championship, beating another Scot, Wilma Aitken, in the final. Robertson, aged 45, became the oldest champion. Kitrina Douglas won in 1982 and she was followed by Jill Thornhill in 1983.

An American,Jody Rosenthal, won in 1984 despite having taken 90 in the first qualifying round and only just qualifying. Lillian Behan, from Ireland, won in 1985 while 17-year-old New Zealander Marnie McGuire won in 1986. McGuire beat Australian Louise Briers in the final, and became the youngest winner since May Hezlet in 1899. Linda Bayman led the qualifying and was top seed in 1987, 1988 and 1989, but failed to get past the second round. Janet Collingham, Joanne Furby and Helen Dobson won in those three years.

Julie Hall won the championship in 1990, while Valerie Michaud won in 1991, beating Wendy Doolan in the final. Pernille Carlson Pedersen was the first Danish winner in 1992 while Catriona Lambert won in 1993. Emma Duggleby won in 1994 beating Cécilia Mourgue d'Algue in the final, while Hall won for the second time in 1995, beating Kristel Mourgue d'Algue, Cécilia's daughter, in the final.

An American, Kelli Kuehne won in 1996, while there was another Scottish winner, Alison Rose in 1997. Kim Rostron won in 1998, beating Gwladys Nocera in the final, the third losing finalist from France in five years. However, Marine Monnet, from France, won in 1999 beating Rebecca Hudson in the final.

In 2000, Rebecca Hudson led the qualifying, was top seed and won the championship, beating Emma Duggleby in the final. She was top seed again in 2001 but lost in the second round. She had her second win in 2002, her third final in four years.

Continental European golfers dominated from 2001 to 2009. Five Spanish women won the championship in this period: Marta Prieto in 2001, Elisa Serramià in 2003, Belén Mozo in 2006, Carlota Ciganda in 2007 and Azahara Muñoz in 2009. Ciganda led the qualifying in 2007, completing the double of being top seed and winning the event. In 2009 Muñoz was joint leader in the qualifying but seeded second on countback. Swedish women also had successes with Louise Stahle winning in 2004 and 2005, with Anna Nordqvist winning in 2008 after being runner-up in 2006 and 2007. Stahle was the top seed when she won in 2005.

British women won the championship from 2010 to 2013. Kelly Tidy won in 2010 while Lauren Taylor beat Tidy in the 2011 semi-finals and went on to win in the championship and, at 16, becoming the youngest winner of the event. Stephanie Meadow won in 2012 while 17-year-old Georgia Hall won in 2013. Hall had been a semi-finalist in 2012. Golfers from continental Europe won from 2014 to 2016. Emily Kristine Pedersen won in 2014 beating Leslie Cloots in the final, while Céline Boutier won in 2015 beating Linnea Ström. 15-year-old Julia Engström won in 2016, replacing Taylor as the youngest winner of the event.

At the start of 2017, the Ladies' Golf Union merged with The R&A, which took over the organisation of the championship. Leona Maguire won in 2017, beating Ainhoa Olarra in the final. Leonie Harm beat Stephanie Lau in the 2018 final. In 2019 the name of the event was changed from the "Ladies' British Open Amateur Championship" to "The Women's Amateur Championship". Emily Toy beat New Zealander Amelia Garvey in the final. The 2020 championship was affected by the COVID-19 pandemic and was not played until late August. Qualifying was reduced to a single round. Aline Krauter beat Annabell Fuller in the final. The format was revised in 2021 with the final extended from 18 to 36 holes. Louise Duncan beat Jóhanna Lea Lúðvíksdóttir 9&8 in the final, the first 36-hole final since 1964.

== Winners ==
Year	Winner	Score	Runner-up	Semi-finalists	Venue	Ref.
2026	(France) Valentine Delon	3 & 1	(Spain) Andrea Revuelta	(Belgium) Savannah De Bock, (United States) Farah O'Keefe	Muirfield	
2025	(Spain) Paula Martín Sampedro	2 & 1	(United States) Farah O'Keefe	(Canada) Tillie Claggett, (Italy) Caterina Don	Nairn	
2024	(United States) Melanie Green	2 up	(Scotland) Lorna McClymont	(Denmark) Marie Eline Madsen, (Sweden) Louise Rydqvist	Portmarnock	
2023	(Germany) Chiara Horder	7 & 6	(United States) Annabelle Pancake	(Sweden) Ingrid Lindblad, (Sweden) Elin Pudas Remler	Prince's	
2022	(England) Jess Baker	4 & 3	(Sweden) Louise Rydqvist	(Spain) Carla Bernat, (Scotland) Hannah Darling	Hunstanton	
2021	(Scotland) Louise Duncan	9 & 8	(Iceland) Jóhanna Lea Lúðvíksdóttir	(Scotland) Hannah Darling, (Scotland) Shannon McWilliam	Kilmarnock (Barassie)	
2020	(Germany) Aline Krauter	1 up	(England) Annabell Fuller	(Italy) Emilie Alba Paltrinieri, (England) Emily Toy	West Lancashire	
2019	(England) Emily Toy	1 up	(New Zealand) Amelia Garvey	(Finland) Daniella Barrett, (Sweden) Linn Grant	Royal County Down	
2018	(Germany) Leonie Harm	3 & 2	(United States) Stephanie Lau	(Canada) Jaclyn Lee, (England) Hollie Muse	Hillside	
2017	(Republic of Ireland) Leona Maguire	3 & 2	(Spain) Ainhoa Olarra	(Finland) Anna Backman, (Norway) Stina Resen	Pyle and Kenfig	
2016	(Sweden) Julia Engström	19 holes	(Netherlands) Dewi Weber	(Spain) María Parra, (United States) Monica Vaughn	Dundonald Links	
2015	(France) Céline Boutier	4 & 3	(Sweden) Linnea Ström	(Belgium) Charlotte De Corte, (Republic of Ireland) Olivia Mehaffey	Portstewart	
2014	(Denmark) Emily Kristine Pedersen	3 & 1	(Belgium) Leslie Cloots	(Sweden) Jenny Haglund, (France) Marion Veysseyre	Royal St George's	
2013	(England) Georgia Hall	1 up	(Spain) Luna Sobrón	(Spain) Noemí Jiménez, (Germany) Karolin Lampert	Machynys Peninsula	
2012	(Northern Ireland) Stephanie Meadow	4 & 3	(Spain) Rocío Sánchez Lobato	(France) Perrine Delacour, (England) Georgia Hall	Carnoustie	
2011	(England) Lauren Taylor	6 & 5	(France) Alexandra Bonetti	(Wales) Amy Boulden, (England) Kelly Tidy	Royal Portrush	
2010	(England) Kelly Tidy	2 & 1	(Scotland) Kelsey MacDonald	(Canada) Rebecca Lee-Bentham, (United States) Meghan Stasi	Ganton	
2009	(Spain) Azahara Muñoz	2 & 1	(Spain) Carlota Ciganda	(England) Laura Collin, (Germany) Caroline Masson	Royal St David's	
2008	(Sweden) Anna Nordqvist	3 & 2	(Sweden) Caroline Hedwall	(Sweden) Jacqueline Hedwall, (Scotland) Roseanne Niven	North Berwick West Links	
2007	(Spain) Carlota Ciganda	4 & 3	(Sweden) Anna Nordqvist	(England) Rachel Bell, (Sweden) Caroline Westrup	Alwoodley	
2006	(Spain) Belén Mozo	3 & 1	(Sweden) Anna Nordqvist	(England) Naomi Edwards, (Spain) María Hernández	Royal County Down	
2005	(Sweden) Louise Stahle	3 & 2	(Republic of Ireland) Claire Coughlan	(Netherlands) Christel Boeljon, (Spain) María Hernández	Littlestone	
2004	(Sweden) Louise Stahle	4 & 2	(Wales) Anna Highgate	(Spain) Elisa Serramià, (England) Sophie Walker	Gullane	
2003	(Spain) Elisa Serramià	2 up	(Germany) Pia Odefey	(Germany) Anja Monke, (France) Fanny Schaeffer	Lindrick	
2002	(England) Rebecca Hudson	5 & 4	(Australia) Lindsey Wright	(Northern Ireland) Alison Coffey, (Germany) Denise Simon	Ashburnham	
2001	(Spain) Marta Prieto	4 & 3	(England) Emma Duggleby	(Spain) Carmen Alonso, (Australia) Nadina Taylor	Ladybank	
2000	(England) Rebecca Hudson	5 & 4	(England) Emma Duggleby	(Sweden) Maria Bodén, (United States) Angela Stanford	Walton Heath	
1999	(France) Marine Monnet	1 up	(England) Rebecca Hudson	(England) Kim Andrew, (England) Fiona Brown	Royal Birkdale	
1998	(England) Kim Rostron	3 & 2	(France) Gwladys Nocera	(England) Fiona Brown, (Scotland) Hilary Monaghan	Little Aston	
1997	(Scotland) Alison Rose	4 & 3	(Scotland) Mhairi McKay	(France) Maïtena Alsuguren, (Wales) Becky Morgan	Cruden Bay	
1996	(United States) Kelli Kuehne	5 & 3	(Wales) Becky Morgan	(France) Sonia Bauer, (England) Elaine Ratcliffe	Royal Liverpool	
1995	(England) Julie Hall	3 & 2	(France) Kristel Mourgue d'Algue	(Republic of Ireland) Hazel Kavanagh, (Scotland) Janice Moodie	Royal Portrush	
1994	(England) Emma Duggleby	3 & 1	(France) Cécilia Mourgue d'Algue	(South Africa) Mandy Adamson, (Scotland) Catriona Matthew	Newport	
1993	(Scotland) Catriona Lambert	3 & 2	(England) Kirsty Speak	(England) Julie Hall (England) Sandy Lambert	Royal Lytham & St Annes	
1992	(Denmark) Pernille Carlson Pedersen	1 up	(England) Joanne Morley	(Republic of Ireland) Tracey Eakin, (Scotland) Catriona Lambert	Saunton	
1991	(France) Valerie Michaud	3 & 2	(Australia) Wendy Doolan	(England) Caroline Hall, (Republic of Ireland) Mary McKenna	Pannal	
1990	(England) Julie Hall	3 & 2	(Wales) Helen Wadsworth	(Canada) Terrill Samuel, (Belgium) Aline Van der Haegen	Dunbar	
1989	(England) Helen Dobson	6 & 5	(Scotland) Elaine Farquharson	(England) Lisa Hackney, (Scotland) Catriona Lambert	Royal Liverpool	
1988	(England) Joanne Furby	4 & 3	(England) Julie Wade	(Republic of Ireland) Claire Hourihane, (Wales) Helen Wadsworth	Royal Cinque Ports	
1987	(England) Janet Collingham	19 holes	(England) Susan Shapcott	(Wales) Karen Davies, (England) Gillian Masters	Royal St David's	
1986	(New Zealand) Marnie McGuire	2 & 1	(Australia) Louise Briers	(Switzerland) Regine Lautens, (England) Caroline Pierce	West Sussex	
1985	(Republic of Ireland) Lillian Behan	1 up	(England) Claire Waite	(Wales) Karen Davies, (Wales) Vicki Thomas	Ganton	
1984	(United States) Jody Rosenthal	4 & 3	(England) Julie Brown	(Scotland) Wilma Aitken, (England) Linda Bayman	Royal Troon	
1983	(England) Jill Thornhill	4 & 2	(Switzerland) Regine Lautens	(France) Marie-Laure de Taya, (France) Cécilia Mourgue d'Algue	Silloth on Solway	
1982	(England) Kitrina Douglas	4 & 2	(Scotland) Gillian Stewart	(Sweden) Viveka Hoff, (Republic of Ireland) Mary McKenna	Walton Heath	
1981	(Scotland) Belle Robertson	20 holes	(Scotland) Wilma Aitken	(Sweden) Viveka Hoff, (Republic of Ireland) Claire Hourihane	Conwy	
1980	(United States) Anne Quast Sander	3 & 1	(Sweden) Liv Wollin	(England) Carole Caldwell, (United States) Carol Semple	Woodhall Spa	
1979	(Northern Ireland) Maureen Madill	2 & 1	(Australia) Jane Lock	(Australia) Edwina Kennedy, (Republic of Ireland) Mary McKenna	Nairn	
1978	(Australia) Edwina Kennedy	1 up	(England) Julia Greenhalgh	(United States) Beth Daniel, (France) Cécilia Mourgue d'Algue	Notts	
1977	(England) Angela Uzielli	6 & 5	(England) Vanessa Marvin	(Republic of Ireland) Mary Gorry, (England) Jenny Lee-Smith	Hillside	
1976	(Scotland) Cathy Panton	1 up	(South Africa) Alison Sheard	(United States) Debbie Massey, (United States) Nancy Roth Syms	Silloth on Solway	
1975	(United States) Nancy Roth Syms	3 & 2	(Scotland) Suzanne Cadden	(Australia) Sandra McCaw, (Canada) Dale Shaw	St Andrews Links	
1974	(United States) Carol Semple	2 & 1	(England) Angela Bonallack	(England) Ann Irvin, (Scotland) Maureen Walker	Royal Porthcawl	
1973	(England) Ann Irvin	3 & 2	(England) Mickey Walker	(Scotland) Belle Robertson, (Scotland) Ina Walker	Carnoustie Golf Links	
1972	(England) Mickey Walker	2 up	(France) Claudine Cros-Rubin	(United States) Laura Baugh, (England) Carol Le Feuvre	Hunstanton	
1971	(England) Mickey Walker	3 & 1	(England) Beverly Huke	(Scotland) Belle Robertson, (England) Linda Denison-Pender	Alwoodley	
1970	(England) Dinah Oxley	1 up	(Scotland) Belle Robertson	(Republic of Ireland) Mary McKenna, (Scotland) Janette Wright	Gullane	
1969	(France) Catherine Lacoste	1 up	(England) Ann Irvin	(England) Dinah Oxley, (Scotland) Isobel Wylie	Royal Portrush	
1968	(France) Brigitte Varangot	20 holes	(France) Claudine Cros-Rubin	(Sweden) Liv Forsell, (Scotland) Belle Robertson	Walton Heath	
1967	(England) Liz Chadwick	1 up	(England) Mary Everard	(England) Sarah German, (Scotland) Margaret Myles	Royal St David's	
1966	(England) Liz Chadwick	3 & 2	(England) Vivien Saunders	(Republic of Ireland) Gwen Brandom, (France) Catherine Lacoste	Ganton	
1965	(France) Brigitte Varangot	4 & 3	(Scotland) Belle Robertson	(France) Claudine Cros, (England) Pam Tredinnick	St Andrews Links	
1964	(United States) Carol Sorenson	37 holes	(England) Bridget Jackson	(Canada) Joanne Goulet, (United States) Phyllis Preuss	Prince's	
1963	(France) Brigitte Varangot	3 & 1	(Republic of Ireland) Philomena Garvey	(France) Claudine Cros, (West Germany) Monika Möller	Royal County Down	
1962	(England) Marley Spearman	1 up	(England) Angela Bonallack	(England) Sue Ashworth, (England) Julia Greenhalgh	Royal Birkdale	
1961	(England) Marley Spearman	7 & 6	(England) Diane Robb	(Republic of Ireland) Dorothy Beck, (France) Claudine Cros	Carnoustie Golf Links	
1960	(United States) Barbara McIntire	4 & 2	(Republic of Ireland) Philomena Garvey	(United States) JoAnne Gunderson, (United States) Anne Quast	Royal St David's	
1959	(England) Elizabeth Price	37 holes	(Scotland) Belle McCorkindale	(Australia) Joan Fletcher, (Republic of Ireland) Philomena Garvey	The Berkshire	
1958	(Scotland) Jessie Valentine	1 up	(England) Elizabeth Price	(England) Angela Bonallack, (England) Jean Hetherington	Hunstanton	
1957	(Republic of Ireland) Philomena Garvey	4 & 3	(Scotland) Jessie Valentine	(England) Veronica Anstey, (England) Elizabeth Price	Gleneagles	
1956	(United States) Wiffi Smith	8 & 7	(United States) Mary Patton Janssen	(United States) Polly Riley, (England) Angela Ward	Sunningdale	
1955	(Scotland) Jessie Valentine	7 & 6	(United States) Barbara Romack	(England) Bridget Jackson, (Scotland) Janette Robertson	Royal Portrush	
1954	(England) Frances Stephens	4 & 3	(England) Elizabeth Price	(Scotland) Betty Singleton, (Canada) Marlene Stewart	Ganton	
1953	(Canada) Marlene Stewart	7 & 6	(Republic of Ireland) Philomena Garvey	(Scotland) Jean Donald, (United States) Mary Lena Faulk	Royal Porthcawl	
1952	(Scotland) Moira Paterson	38 holes	(England) Frances Stephens	(Scotland) Helen Burton, (United States) Mae Murray	Troon	
1951	(Republic of Ireland) Kitty MacCann	4 & 3	(England) Frances Stephens	(England) Jeanne Bisgood, (Scotland) Jean Donald	Broadstone	
1950	(France) Vicomtesse de St Sauveur	3 & 2	(Scotland) Jessie Valentine	(Australia) Judith Percy, (England) Elizabeth Price	Royal County Down	
1949	(England) Frances Stephens	5 & 4	(Republic of Ireland) Clarrie Reddan	(Scotland) Vyvian Falconer, (Republic of Ireland) Philomena Garvey	Royal St David's	
1948	(United States) Louise Suggs	1 up	(Scotland) Jean Donald	(United States) Dorothy Kielty, (England) Maureen Ruttle	Royal Lytham & St Annes	
1947	(United States) Babe Zaharias	5 & 4	(England) Jacqueline Gordon	(Scotland) Jean Donald, (Scotland) Jessie Valentine	Gullane	
1946	(England) Jean Hetherington	1 up	(Republic of Ireland) Philomena Garvey	(Scotland) Jean Donald, (England) Maureen Ruttle	Hunstanton	
1940–1945: Not played due to World War II
1939	(England) Pam Barton	2 & 1	(Northern Ireland) Jean Marks	(England) Beryl Newton, (Republic of Ireland) Clarrie Tiernan	Royal Portrush	
1938	(Scotland) Helen Holm	4 & 3	(England) Elsie Corlett	(England) Mervyn Barton, (Republic of Ireland) Pat Fletcher	Burnham & Berrow	
1937	(Scotland) Jessie Anderson	6 & 4	(Scotland) Doris Park	(England) Elsie Corlett, (England) Evelyn McNair	Turnberry	
1936	(England) Pam Barton	7 & 5	(England) Bridget Newell	(England) Kathleen Garnham, (England) Molly Gourlay	Southport and Ainsdale	
1935	(England) Wanda Morgan	3 & 2	(England) Pam Barton	(Scotland) Jessie Anderson, (England) Mervyn Barton	Royal County Down	
1934	(Scotland) Helen Holm	6 & 5	(England) Pam Barton	(England) Elsie Corlett, (Republic of Ireland) Eithne Pentony	Royal Porthcawl	
1933	(England) Enid Wilson	5 & 4	(England) Diana Plumpton	(England) Diana Fishwick, (Scotland) Doris Park	Gleneagles	
1932	(England) Enid Wilson	7 & 6	(Scotland) Clem Montgomery	(United States) Leona Cheney (England) Ina Clarke	Saunton	
1931	(England) Enid Wilson	7 & 6	(England) Wanda Morgan	(England) Molly Gourlay, (Scotland) Ysobel Greenlees	Portmarnock	
1930	(England) Diana Fishwick	4 & 3	(United States) Glenna Collett	(Scotland) Kathleen Macdonald, (England) Enid Wilson	Formby	
1929	(England) Joyce Wethered	3 & 1	(United States) Glenna Collett	(England) Edith Guedalla, (Scotland) Doris Park	St Andrews Links	
1928	(France) Manette le Blan	3 & 2	(England) Sylvia Marshall	(England) Judith Fowler, (England) Enid Wilson	Hunstanton	
1927	(France) Simone de la Chaume	5 & 4	(England) Dorothy Pearson	(France) Manette le Blan, (England) Enid Wilson	Royal County Down	
1926	(England) Cecil Leitch	8 & 7	(England) Marjorie Ross Garon	(France) Simone de la Chaume, (England) Winifred McNair	Royal St David's	
1925	(England) Joyce Wethered	37 holes	(England) Cecil Leitch	(England) Beryl Brown, (England) Gladys Dobell	Troon	
1924	(England) Joyce Wethered	7 & 6	(England) Beryl Cautley	(England) Molly Gourlay, (England) Eleanor Helme	Royal Portrush	
1923	(England) Doris Chambers	1 up	(England) Muriel Macbeth	(England) Beryl Brown, (England) Joyce Wethered	Burnham & Berrow	
1922	(England) Joyce Wethered	9 & 7	(England) Cecil Leitch	(England) Gladys Bastin, (England) Joan Stocker	Prince's	
1921	(England) Cecil Leitch	4 & 3	(England) Joyce Wethered	(Republic of Ireland) Janet Jackson, (Scotland) Lena Scroggie	Turnberry	
1920	(England) Cecil Leitch	7 & 6	(England) Molly Griffiths	(England) Doris Fraser, (Republic of Ireland) Janet Jackson	Royal County Down	
1919	Cancelled because of a railway strike				Burnham & Berrow	
1915–1918: Not played due to World War I
1914	(England) Cecil Leitch	2 & 1	(England) Gladys Ravenscroft	(England) Muriel Dodd, (Scotland) Elsie Grant Suttie	Hunstanton	
1913	(England) Muriel Dodd	8 & 6	(England) Evelyn Chubb	(Ireland) Janet Jackson, (Canada) Violet Pooley	Lytham & St Annes	
1912	(England) Gladys Ravenscroft	3 & 2	(England) Stella Temple	(England) Gladys Heming-Johnson, (England) Cecil Leitch	Turnberry	
1911	(Scotland) Dorothy Campbell	3 & 2	(Ireland) Violet Hezlet	(Scotland) Florence Bourn, (England) Hilda Mather	Royal Portrush	
1910	(Scotland) Elsie Grant Suttie	6 & 4	(England) Lily Moore	(England) Madge Neill-Fraser, (England) Gladys Tamworth	Royal North Devon	
1909	(Scotland) Dorothy Campbell	4 & 3	(Ireland) Florence Hezlet	(England) Doris Chambers, (Scotland) Katharine Stuart	Birkdale	
1908	(England) Maud Titterton	19 holes	(Scotland) Dorothy Campbell	(England) Cecil Leitch, (England) Hilda Mather	St Andrews Links	
1907	(Ireland) May Hezlet	2 & 1	(Ireland) Florence Hezlet	(Scotland) Violet Henry-Anderson, (Ireland) Violet Tynte	County Down	
1906	(England) Alice Kennion	4 & 3	(England) Bertha Thompson	(Scotland) Dorothy Campbell, (England) Amy Sumpter	Burnham & Berrow	
1905	(England) Bertha Thompson	3 & 2	(Ireland) Maud Stuart	(Scotland) Winifred Brown, (Scotland) Dorothy Campbell	Royal Cromer	
1904	(England) Lottie Dod	1 up	(Ireland) May Hezlet	(Scotland) Dorothy Campbell, (Scotland) Molly Graham	Troon	
1903	(Ireland) Rhona Adair	4 & 3	(Ireland) Florence Walker-Leigh	(Scotland) Flora Macbeth, (Ireland) Maud Stuart	Royal Portrush	
1902	(Ireland) May Hezlet	20 holes	(England) Elinor Nevile	(Scotland) Grace Park, (Scotland) Sybil Whigham	Royal Cinque Ports	
1901	(Scotland) Molly Graham	3 & 2	(Ireland) Rhona Adair	(England) Elinor Nevile, (England) Sophie Stubbs	Aberdovey	
1900	(Ireland) Rhona Adair	6 & 5	(England) Isabel Nevile	(England) Alice Richardson, (Scotland) Molly Whigham	Royal North Devon	
1899	(Ireland) May Hezlet	2 & 1	(Ireland) Jessie Magill	(England) Winifred Bryan, (England) Lottie Dod	County Down	
1898	(Scotland) Lena Thomson	6 & 5	(England) Elinor Nevile	(England) Amy Barwell, (England) Lottie Dod	Great Yarmouth & Caister	
1897	(Scotland) Edith Orr	4 & 3	(Scotland) Theodora Orr	(England) Emma Kennedy, (England) Maud Titterton	Gullane	
1896	(England) Amy Pascoe	3 & 2	(Scotland) Lena Thomson	(England) Katherine Moeller, (England) Issette Pearson	Royal Liverpool	
1895	(England) Lady Margaret Scott	5 & 4	(England) Emma Lythgoe	(England) Alice Richardson, (England) Grace Willock	Royal Portrush	
1894	(England) Lady Margaret Scott	3 & 2	(England) Issette Pearson	(England) Maud Starkie Bence, (England) May Mugliston	Littlestone	
1893	(England) Lady Margaret Scott	7 & 5	(England) Issette Pearson	(England) Florence Carr, (England) Effie Terry	Lytham & St Annes	

=== Multiple winners ===
Eighteen players have won more than one Women's Amateur Championship, through 2025:

- 4 wins: Cecil Leitch, Joyce Wethered
- 3 wins: Lady Margaret Scott, May Hezlet, Enid Wilson, Jessie Valentine, Brigitte Varangot
- 2 wins: Rhona Adair, Dorothy Campbell, Helen Holm, Pam Barton, Frances Stephens, Marley Spearman, Liz Chadwick, Mickey Walker, Julie Hall, Rebecca Hudson, Louise Stahle

Eleven players have won both the Women's Amateur and U.S. Women's Amateur Championships, through 2024:

- Dorothy Campbell:^ 1909, 1911 British; 1909, 1910, 1924 U.S.
- Gladys Ravenscroft: 1912 British; 1913 U.S.
- Pam Barton:^ 1936, 1939 British; 1936 U.S.
- Babe Zaharias: 1947 British; 1946 U.S.
- Louise Suggs: 1948 British; 1947 U.S.
- Marlene Stewart Streit: 1953 British; 1956 U.S.
- Barbara McIntire: 1960 British; 1959, 1964 U.S.
- Catherine Lacoste:^ 1969 British; 1969 U.S.
- Carol Semple Thompson: 1974 British; 1973 U.S.
- Anne Quast: 1980 British; 1958, 1961, 1963 U.S.
- Kelli Kuehne:^ 1996 British; 1996 U.S.

^ Won both in same year.

== Stroke-play qualifying ==
Stroke-play qualifying was first used from 1931 to 1936. 36 holes were played with the leading 64 advancing to the match-play stage. There was no seeding. In 1931 qualifying was on Saturday and Monday but was then moved to Friday and Saturday. The leading qualifiers in this period were:

- 1931 Enid Wilson (158)
- 1932 Maureen Orcutt (151)
- 1933 Doris Park (153)
- 1934 Molly Gourlay (152)
- 1935 Ina Clarke (158)
- 1936 Bridget Newell (152)

Qualifying was reintroduced in 1966. Originally it was intended that 64 players would qualify but because of weather conditions, this was reduced to 32. The match-play draw was seeded. The number of qualifiers remained at 32 in 1967. In 1968, bad weather reduced the qualifying to one round and, as a result, the number of qualifiers was increased to 64, returning to 32 in 1969. The number of qualifiers was generally 32, although in 1972, 1975, 1982 and 1988 it was increased to 64. In 1990 the number of qualifiers was increased to 64 where it has remained.

- 1966 Catherine Lacoste (148)
- 1967 Catherine Lacoste (150)
- 1968 Peggy Conley (77)
- 1969 Catherine Lacoste (150)
- 1970 Dinah Oxley (149)
- 1971 Beverly Huke (148)
- 1972 Belle Robertson (155)
- 1973 Anne Sander (143)
- 1974 Ann Irvin, Anne Sander+ (150)
- 1975 Carol Semple (144)
- 1976 Debbie Massey (148)
- 1977 Julia Greenhalgh (150)
- 1978 Beth Daniel (145)
- 1979 Edwina Kennedy (144)
- 1980 Brenda Goldsmith (150)
- 1981 Belle Robertson (145)
- 1982 Marie-Laure de Taya+, Marta Figueras-Dotti (145)
- 1983 Mary Gallagher, Beverley New+ (153)
- 1984 Wilma Aitken (152)
- 1985 Marie-Laure de Taya (152)
- 1986 Jill Thornhill (145)
- 1987 Linda Bayman+, Karen Davies (147)
- 1988 Linda Bayman (145)
- 1989 Linda Bayman (147)
- 1990 Lisa Hackney, Kathryn Imrie+, Martina Koch (142)
- 1991 Jane Shearwood, Aline Van der Haegen+ (147)
- 1992 Alison Rose (148)
- 1993 Janice Moodie (145)
- 1994 Julie Hall (142)
- 1995 Julie Hall (144)
- 1996 Eileen Rose Power (144)
- 1997 Janice Moodie (137)
- 1998 Karine Icher (145)
- 1999 Kim Andrew+, Rebecca Hudson, Gwladys Nocera (151)
- 2000 Rebecca Hudson+, Jessica Lindbergh (141)
- 2001 Rebecca Hudson (137)
- 2002 Alison Coffey (143)
- 2003 Danielle Masters (145)
- 2004 Christine Boucher (69)
- 2005 Louise Stahle (145)
- 2006 Azahara Muñoz (142)
- 2007 Carlota Ciganda (138)
- 2008 Caroline Hedwall (140)
- 2009 Carlota Ciganda+, Azahara Muñoz (138)
- 2010 Caroline Hedwall (143)
- 2011 Camilla Hedberg (140)
- 2012 Céline Boutier, Sally Watson+ (141)
- 2013 Nanna Madsen, Su-Hyun Oh+ (141)
- 2014 Laetitia Beck (141)
- 2015 Leona Maguire (135)
- 2016 Leslie Cloots (142)
- 2017 Paula Grant (138)
- 2018 Elodie Chapelet, Elin Esborn+, Esther Henseleit (143)
- 2019 Hannah Screen (139)
- 2020 Rosie Belsham, Amalie Leth-Nissen+, Carolina Melgrati, Emily Price, Isabelle Simpson (71)
- 2021 Ragnhildur Kristinsdóttir (140)
- 2022 Emilie Alba Paltrinieri, Ami Yamashita+ (138)
- 2023 Beth Coulter (139)
- 2024 Lottie Woad (135)
- 2025 Jasmine Koo (138)
- 2026 Lily Hirst (136)

+ Number one seed. If two or more players are tied, the seeding is decided on countback, the player with the lowest second round score being seeded higher. If players are still tied, the last 9 holes of the second round are used.

== Host courses ==
The Women's Amateur Championship has been played at the following courses, listed in order of number of tournaments hosted (as of 2026):

- 9 Royal County Down Golf Club, Royal Portrush Golf Club
- 6 Hunstanton Golf Club, Royal St David's Golf Club
- 5 Royal Troon Golf Club
- 4 Ganton Golf Club, Gullane Golf Club, Royal Lytham & St Annes Golf Club, St Andrews Links
- 3 Burnham & Berrow Golf Club, Carnoustie Golf Links, Prince's Golf Club, Royal Birkdale Golf Club, Royal Liverpool Golf Club, Royal Porthcawl Golf Club, Turnberry Golf Club
- 2 Alwoodley Golf Club, Hillside Golf Club, Gleneagles, Littlestone Golf Club, Nairn Golf Club, Portmarnock Golf Club, Prince's Golf Club, Royal Cinque Ports Golf Club, Royal North Devon Golf Club, Saunton Golf Club, Silloth-on-Solway Golf Club, Walton Heath Golf Club
- 1 Aberdovey Golf Club, Ashburnham Golf Club, The Berkshire Golf Club, Broadstone Golf Club, Conwy Golf Club, Cruden Bay Golf Club, Dunbar Golf Club, Dundonald Links, Formby Golf Club, Great Yarmouth & Caister Golf Club, Kilmarnock (Barassie) Golf Club, Ladybank Golf Club, Lindrick Golf Club, Little Aston Golf Club, Muirfield, Newport Golf Club, North Berwick West Links, Notts (Hollinwell) Golf Club, Pannal Golf Club, Portmarnock Golf Club, Portstewart Golf Club, Prestwick Golf Club, Pyle & Kenfig Golf Club, Royal Cromer Golf Club, Royal St George's Golf Club, Southport and Ainsdale Golf Club, Sunningdale Golf Club, West Lancashire Golf Club, West Sussex Golf Club, Woodhall Spa Golf Club

=== Future sites ===
- 2027 - Royal Cinque Ports
