= Florence Hezlet =

Irish golfer

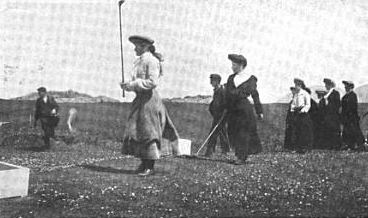
- Florence Hezlet hitting a tee shot in the 1905 Irish Ladies Championship

Personal information
- Full name: Florence Eugenia Hezlet
- Nationality: Ireland
- Born: c. 1886 Ireland
- Died: 2 November 1945

Career
- Sport: Golf
- Status: Amateur

Florence Eugenia Hezlet (c. 1886 – 2 November 1945) was an Irish amateur golfer who played in the early 20th century.

== Early life ==
Hezlet and her sisters, May Hezlet and Violet Hezlet, grew up in Ireland and became top golfers in their era.

== Golf career ==
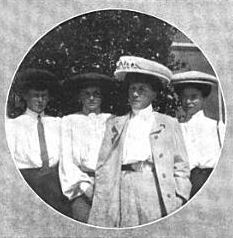
The Hezlet ladies (L-R, Violet, Florence, Mrs. Hezlet, May Hezlet)

=== 1907 British Ladies Amateur ===
In the 1907 British Ladies Amateur, held at Royal County Down Golf Club, she finished second, losing to her sister May by the score of 2 and 1.

=== 1908 British Ladies Amateur ===
Florence would face her sister May once again in the finals of the 1908 British Ladies Amateur. She fell short again, losing by the score of 5 and 4. The tournament was quite the family affair. Florence had beaten her sister Violet in the semi-finals to set up the final match against May.

=== 1909 British Ladies Amateur ===
Hezlet was the runner-up by the final score of 4 and 3 to Dorothy Campbell in the 1909 British Ladies Amateur at Royal Birkdale Golf Club.

== Family ==
She married Robert Alexander Cramsie in Aghadowey in August 1910 and was later known by her married name. Her husband died in July 1942. In addition to her sisters, she had a brother, Charles Hezlet, who was runner-up in The Amateur Championship in 1914, played in the Walker Cup, and won several Irish amateur titles.

== Death ==
Hezlet's date of birth is unknown. She died on 2 November 1945 at O'Harabrook, Ballymoney, County Antrim.
