= Lady Margaret Scott (golfer) =

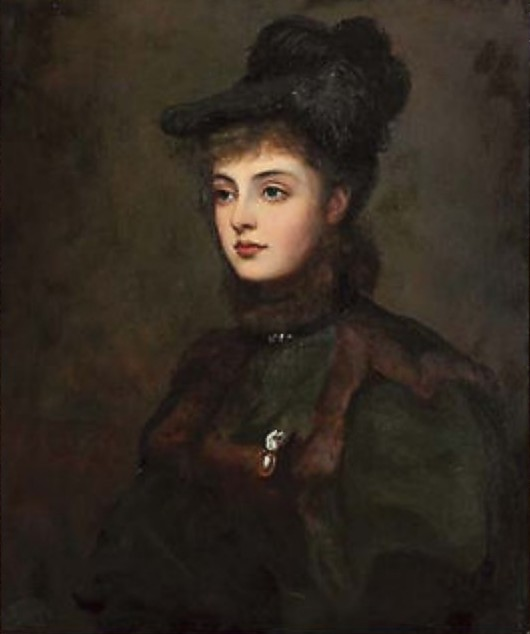
Lady Margaret Scott (1897) by Ellis William Roberts

Lady Margaret Rachel Hamilton-Russell (née Scott; 5 April 1874 – 27 January 1938) was an English golfer who was a dominant player in early women's golf. She won the first three British Ladies Amateurs in 1893, 1894, and 1895.

== Career ==
Scott was born at No. 1. Hamilton Place, Mayfair, the fourth of seven children born to John Scott, 3rd Earl of Eldon and his wife Henrietta Turner. Several of her brothers were also golfers; Michael Scott won The Amateur Championship in 1933 towards the end of a long career, Osmund Scott was the runner-up in the same tournament in 1905, and Denys Scott also played.

In her first two championship wins, Lady Margaret Scott beat Issette Pearson, the founder and first Secretary of the Ladies' Golf Union. She won by 7 & 5 in 1893 and 3 & 2 in 1894, then beat Emma Lythgoe 5 & 4 in 1895. Thereafter, Scott retired from competitive golf.

== Personal life ==
In 1897, she married the Hon. Frederick Gustavus Hamilton-Russell, younger brother of 9th Viscount Boyne. She died in 1938 in London at the age of 63.

== Amateur wins ==
- 1893 The Women's Amateur Championship
- 1894 The Women's Amateur Championship
- 1895 The Women's Amateur Championship
