= Roger Lloyd Kennion =

Lieutenant Colonel Roger Lloyd Kennion CIE (16 December 1866 – 26 March 1942) was an officer in the British Indian Army and travel writer. Educated at Monkton Combe School and at Repton School, he was first commissioned in 1887, entered the Central India Horse in 1890 and joined the Indian Foreign and Political Department in 1893, serving in Kashmir, Gilgit and Leh. In 1907 Kennion was appointed Consul for the Districts of Seistan and Kain in Iran. In 1915 the then Lt. Colonel Kennion was appointed the Consul for Arabistan at Kermanshah.

He was appointed a Companion of the Order of the Indian Empire in the London Gazette of 1 January 1918 for meritorious service in connection with the war.

He retired on 9 April 1922. and died in Petersfield, Hampshire in 1942.

In addition to his service, he was the author of several books about his travels in India and the surrounding countries. Kennion's correspondence papers with Lord Hardinge are recorded in the National Register of Archives

Kennion and his wife Marion had a daughter.

== Publications ==
- Sport and life in the further Himalaya. Edinburgh, London: W. Blackwood, 1910.
- By Mountain, lake, and plain : being sketches of sport in eastern Persia. Edinburgh; London : W. Blackwood, 1911.
- Diversions of an Indian political Edinburgh: W. Blackwood, 1932.
