= Simone de la Chaume =

French amateur golfer

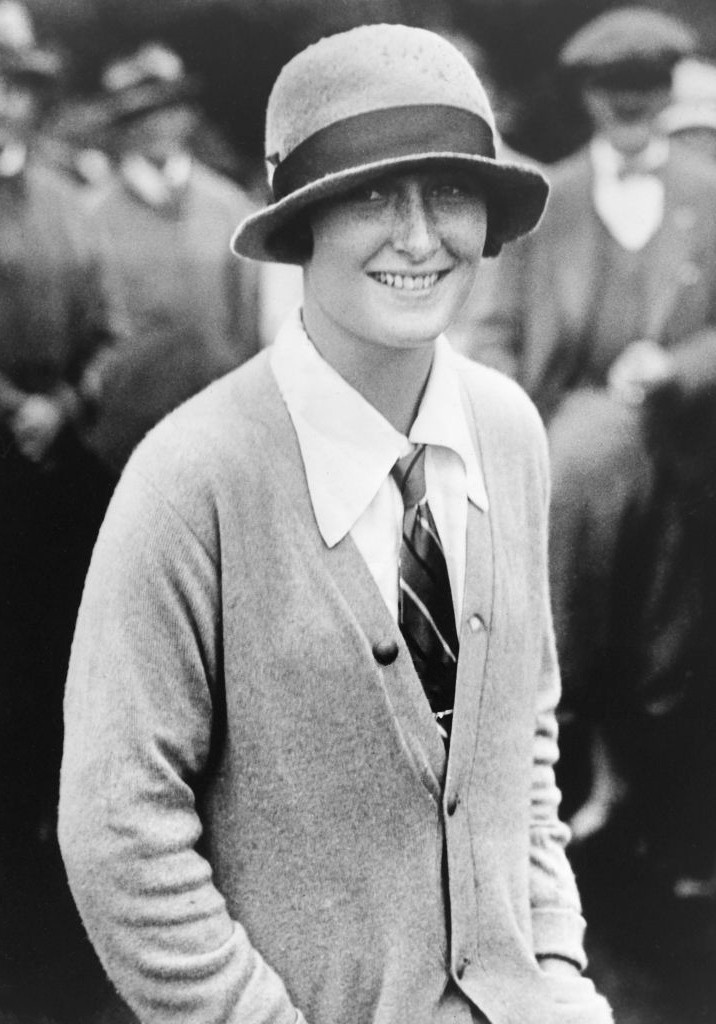
Simone de la Chaume in 1929

Simone Thion de la Chaume (24 November 1908 – 4 September 2001) was a French amateur golfer.

== Career ==
In 1924, she became the first foreign player to win the Girls Amateur Championship and in 1927 the first to win the British Ladies Amateur, then the most prestigious tournament in British and European ladies' golf and an event her daughter, Catherine Lacoste, would also win 42 years later.

At the 1927 U.S. Women's Amateur, she lost in the third round to former three-time champion, Alexa Stirling.

== Personal life ==
While attending a Davis Cup match, Simone de la Chaume met the French tennis star René Lacoste. They married in 1930 and had three sons and a daughter. The Lacostes would go on to form the Lacoste company and build a sportswear empire. They also founded the Golf de Chantaco club in Saint-Jean-de-Luz in the Pyrénées-Atlantiques département of France near Biarritz.

Simone Lacoste died in Saint-Jean-de-Luz in 2001.

== Amateur wins ==
- 1924 Girls Amateur Championship
- 1927 British Ladies Amateur
- 1930 French International Ladies Golf Championship
- 1935 French International Ladies Golf Championship
- 1936 French Ladies National Championship
- 1937 French Ladies National Championship
- 1938 French International Ladies Golf Championship
- 1939 French International Ladies Golf Championship, French Ladies National Championship
