= Issette Pearson =

English golfer

- in her 30s

Personal information
- Full name: Frances Issette Jessie Pearson
- Born: 2 November 1861 Littlehempston, Devon, England
- Died: 25 April 1941 (aged 79) Singleton, Lancashire, England
- Spouse: Thomas Horrocks Miller

Career
- Sport: Golf
- Status: Amateur

Frances Issette Jessie Pearson (2 November 1861 – 25 April 1941) was an English golfer and the first honorary secretary of the Ladies Golf Union (LGU) which was founded in 1893.

== Personal life ==
Pearson was born at Gatcombe House, Littlehempston, near Totnes, Devon. Her given names were Mable Frances, but she used the names Frances Issette Jessie and was known as Issette. In 1911, she married Thomas Horrocks Miller (1846–1916) of Singleton Hall, Singleton, near Poulton-le-Fylde. In 1916, upon her husband's death, she became life tenant of Singleton Hall.

== Golf career ==
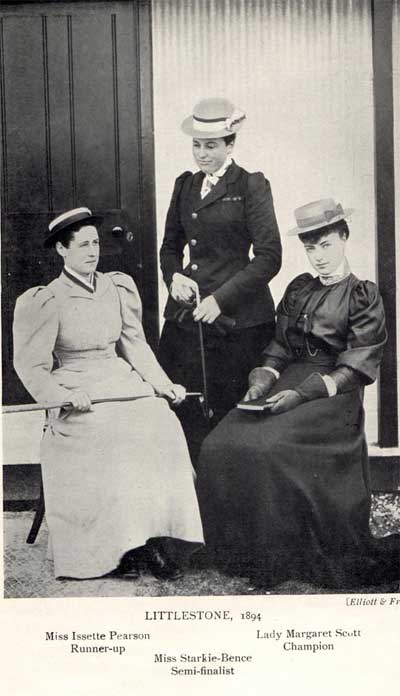
At the second national ladies' golf championship in 1894

In 1893 Pearson visited Littlestone golf club in the autumn of 1893 to see if the national championship could be hosted there. She was hosted by Littlestone's ladies's captain Mabel Stringer. Stringer beat her on their first game together, but they became lifelong friends and colleagues.

Pearson had reached the final of the British Ladies Amateur Golf Championship in 1893 and she would repeat that position in 1894, losing to Lady Margaret Scott on each occasion.

== Legacy ==
While telegraphic addresses were in use the LGU's address was "Issette". A brand of ladies' golfwear is named "Issette" in her memory. She founded a cup and a handicap system that allowed men and women of mixed abilities to compete together.

== Publications ==
- The Ladies' Golf Union year book / compiled and edited by the Hon. Sec. Ladies' Golf Union (I. Pearson). (London : Ladies' Golf Union, 189?)
- Our Lady of the Green. A book of ladies' golf. With chapters by I. Pearson, A. B. Pascoe and others. Edited by L. Mackern and M. Boys. (London : Lawrence & Bullen, 1899)
