= Cecil Leitch =

British amateur golfer (1891–1977)

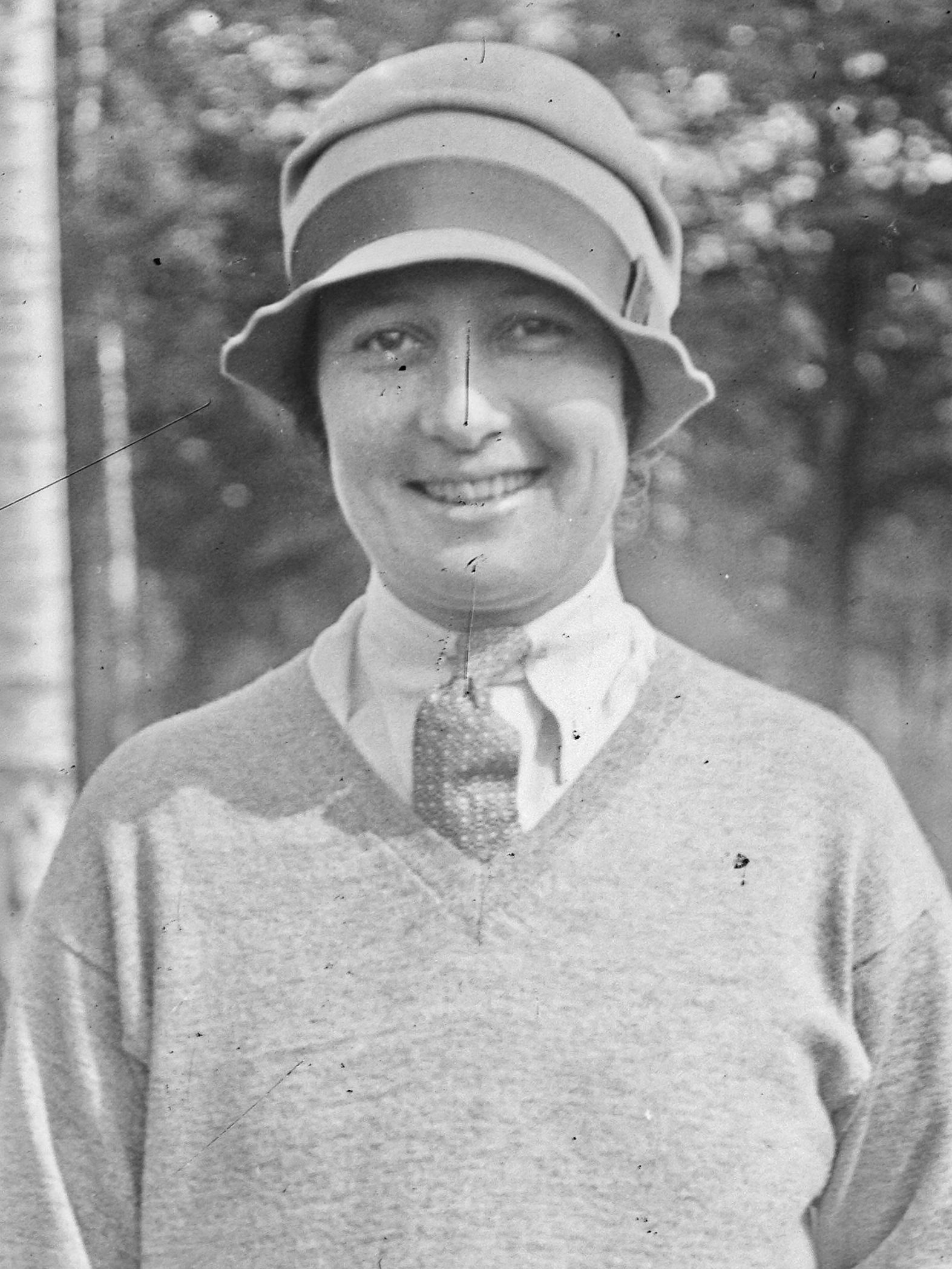
- Leitch in 1926

Personal information
- Full name: Charlotte Cecilia Pitcairn Leitch
- Nationality: England
- Born: 13 April 1891 Silloth, England
- Died: 16 September 1977 (aged 86) London, England

Career
- Sport: Golf
- Status: Amateur

Charlotte Cecilia Pitcairn Leitch (13 April 1891 – 16 September 1977) was an English amateur golfer and author. She won 12 national titles as well as five French Ladies Amateurs and one Canadian Women's Amateur.

== Early life ==
In 1891, Leitch was born in Monimail, Silloth, Cumberland, England. She was the sixth of the seven children of Dr. John Leitch (1849–1896), a doctor and botanist, and Catherine Edith Redford (1858–1937). She was educated at home and at Carlisle Girls' High School.

She became proficient at golf at an early age, and played the Silloth course with her sisters who were also avid golfers.

== Golf career ==
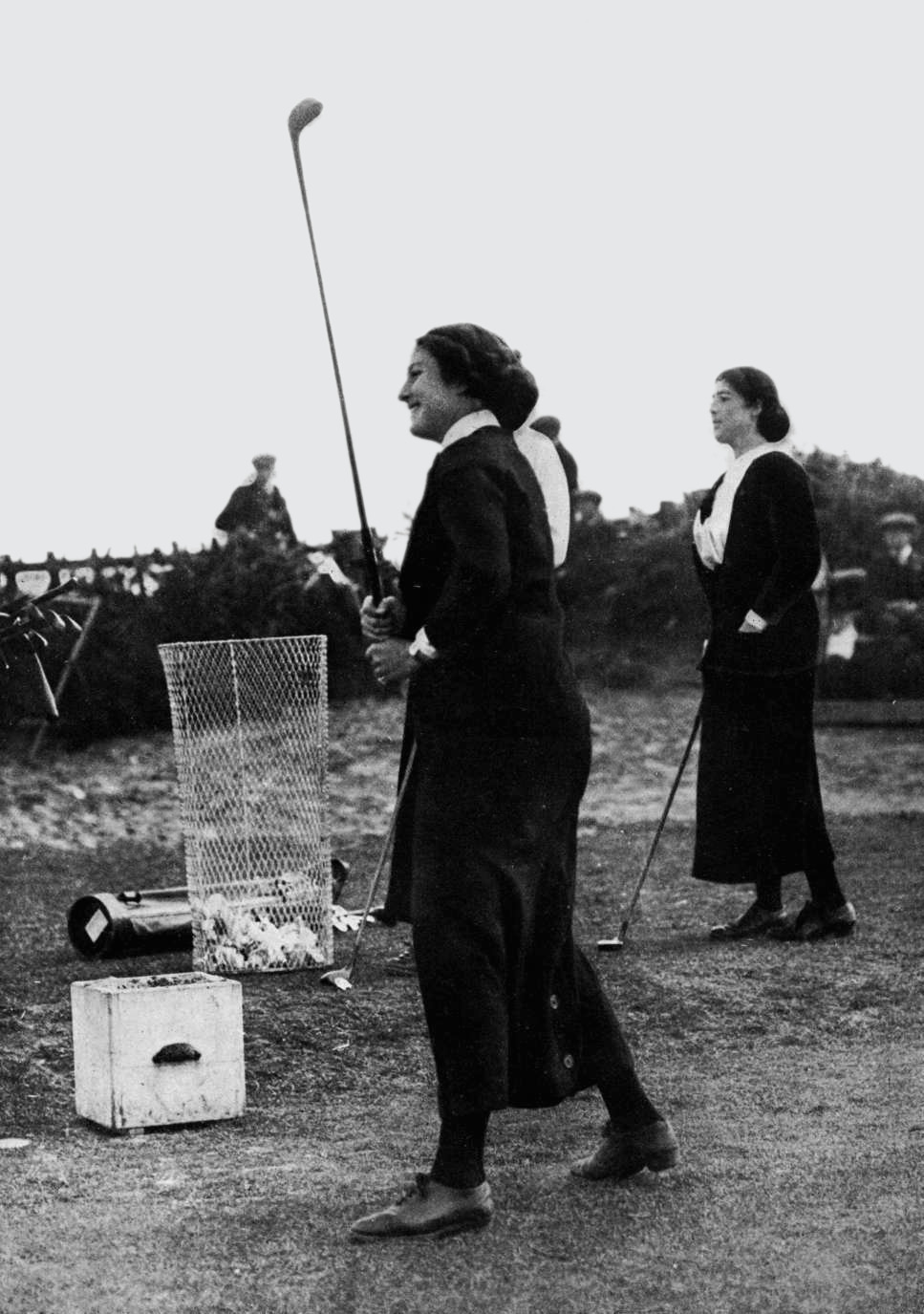
Leitch, with her sister, c. 1912

In 1914, she won the first of her four British Ladies Amateurs, taking the title from Muriel Dodd. Her opportunity to possibly win several more was interrupted for five years during World War I. When the Championship was restarted after the war, she won her second straight title then the following year made it three in a row. Leitch was able to reach the Championship finals on six occasions, and in 1926 won her fourth British title, a record she shares with Joyce Wethered. In 1921, she was the medalist in her first appearance at the Berthellyn Cup at the Huntingdon Valley Country Club in Philadelphia. She lost in the first round of match play to the eventual tournament winner Glenna Collett. Leitch returned to the event in 1922 but a ligament injury did not allow her to compete.

She received golf lessons from Thomas Renouf, the head professional at Silloth.

Leitch retired from competition in 1928 having won 12 UK national titles, plus five French Ladies Amateurs, and one Canadian Women's Amateur.

Leitch was a regular writer on golf for newspapers and magazines, and published three books on golf: Golf for Girls (1911), Golf (1922), and Golf Simplified (1924).

After retirement from competitive golf, Leitch worked in the antiques trade and later in cinema. She was a prominent member of many voluntary and campaigning organisations, including the National Playing Fields Association the Central Council of Physical Recreation, and the YMCA. She also played a key role in the foundation of the Women Golfers' Museum.

== Personal life ==
In 1977, Leitch died at her home in London.

== Amateur wins ==
- 1914 British Ladies Amateur, English Women's Amateur Championship
- 1919 English Women's Amateur Championship
- 1920 British Ladies Amateur
- 1921 British Ladies Amateur, Canadian Women's Amateur
- 1926 British Ladies Amateur
