= Royal County Down Golf Club =

Golf club in Northern Ireland

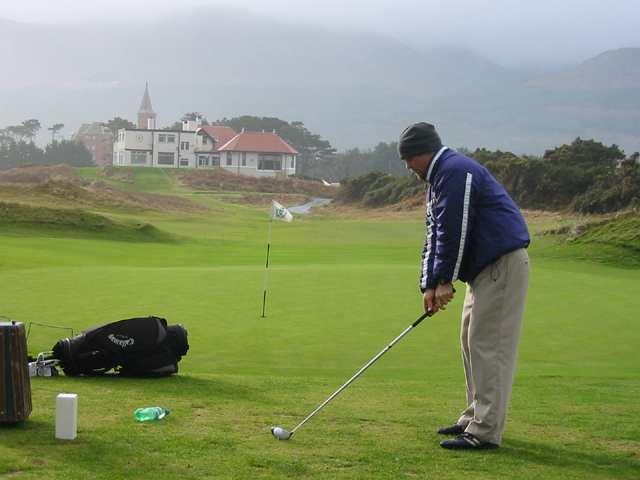
- Royal County Down in 2004

- Location in Northern Ireland Location in the United Kingdom Royal County Down Golf Club (island of Ireland) Royal County Down Golf Club (the United Kingdom)
- 54.218°N 5.884°W

Club information
- Location: Newcastle, County Down, Northern Ireland
- Established: 1889, 137 years ago
- Total holes: 36
- Tournaments: Senior British Open; The Amateur Championship; British Ladies Amateur; Curtis Cup; Walker Cup; Irish Open
- Website: royalcountydown.org

Championship Links
- Designed by: Old Tom Morris; George Combe; Harry Vardon; Harry Colt
- Par: 71
- Length: 7,186 yards (6,571 m)
- Course rating: 75.0
- Slope rating: 142

Annesley Links
- Par: 66
- Length: 4,617 yards (4,222 m)

Royal County Down Golf Club is a golf club in Northern Ireland, located in Newcastle, Newry, Mourne and Down. It opened 137 years ago on 23 March 1889 and is one of the oldest golf clubs in Ireland. Approximately 30 miles south of Belfast, it has two 18-hole links courses, the Championship Course and the Annesley Links.

== Significant tournaments ==
Royal County Down has made outstanding contributions to Irish golf, hosting many important tournaments, starting soon after it opened, and continuing to the present day. Notably, the club in 2007 became just the second Irish venue, after Portmarnock, to host the Walker Cup. The Irish Open on the European Tour took place in late May in 2015, returning to Royal County Down after 76 years. It previously hosted the event three times, all prior to World War II. The British Ladies Amateur Golf Championship were held on the course in June 2019.

- Senior British Open Championship (3): 2000 (winner: Christy O'Connor Jnr), 2001 (winner: Ian Stanley), 2002 (winner: Noboru Sugai).
- The Amateur Championship (2): 1970 (winner: Michael Bonallack) and 1999 (winner: Graeme Storm).
- British Ladies Amateur Golf Championship (8): 1899 (winner: May Hezlet), 1907 (winner: May Hezlet), 1920 (winner: Cecil Leitch), 1927 (winner: Simone de la Chaume), 1935 (winner: Wanda Morgan), 1950 (winner: Vicomtesse de St Sauveur), 1963 (winner: Brigitte Varangot), 2006 (winner: Belén Mozo).
- Curtis Cup: 1968 United States defeated Great Britain & Ireland, 10.5 to 7.5.
- Walker Cup: 2007 United States defeated Great Britain & Ireland, 12.5 to 11.5.
- Palmer Cup: 2012 Europe defeated United States, 13½ to 10½.
- Irish Open (5): 1928, 1935, 1939, 2015, 2024
- European Ladies' Team Championship: 2021

== History ==
Royal County Down Golf Club secured 2nd place in golfscape's World's Top 100 Golf Course ranking 2020. Golf Digest ranked it #1 on its World's 100 Greatest Courses list for 2024.

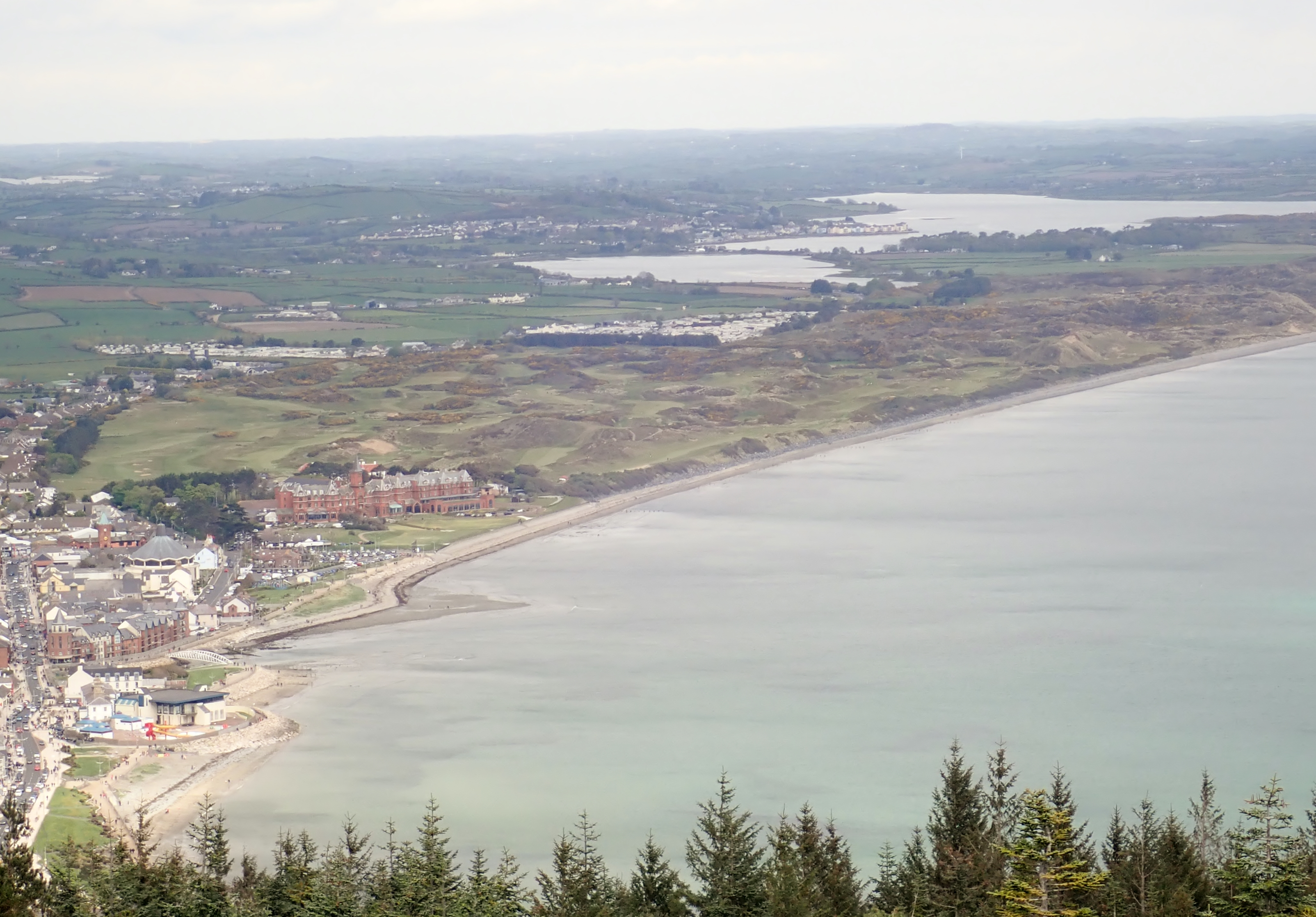
Aerial view of The Royal County Down Golf Club from Donard Wood in 2019

== Scorecard ==
The Championship Links
Tee	Rating/Slope	1	2	3	4	5	6	7	8	9	Out	10	11	12	13	14	15	16	17	18	In	Total
Blue	75.0 / 142	539	444	475	229	440	396	144	429	483	3579	196	442	525	446	212	468	337	433	548	3607	7186
White	74.0 / 131	523	424	475	215	429	369	135	424	427	3421	188	430	478	423	202	454	318	416	548	3457	6878
Yellow	73.0 / 126	503	387	455	202	419	355	125	414	427	3287	180	430	469	423	202	454	300	402	528	3388	6675
Par	Men's	5	4	4	3	4	4	3	4	4	35	3	4	5	4	3	4	4	4	5	36	71
SI	Men's	13	9	3	15	7	11	17	1	5		18	8	16	2	12	4	14	10	6
Red	77.0 / 148	483	344	423	159	395	338	113	405	429	3089	172	389	455	409	195	410	276	374	480	3160	6249
Par	Ladies	5	4	5	3	4	4	3	5	5	38	3	4	5	5	3	5	4	4	5	38	76
SI	Ladies	13	3	9	15	7	1	17	5	11		16	2	8	12	14	4	18	6	10

== See also ==
- List of golf clubs granted Royal status
- Royal Portrush Golf Club
- Portstewart Golf Club
