= Dorothy Campbell =

Scottish golfer (1883–1945)

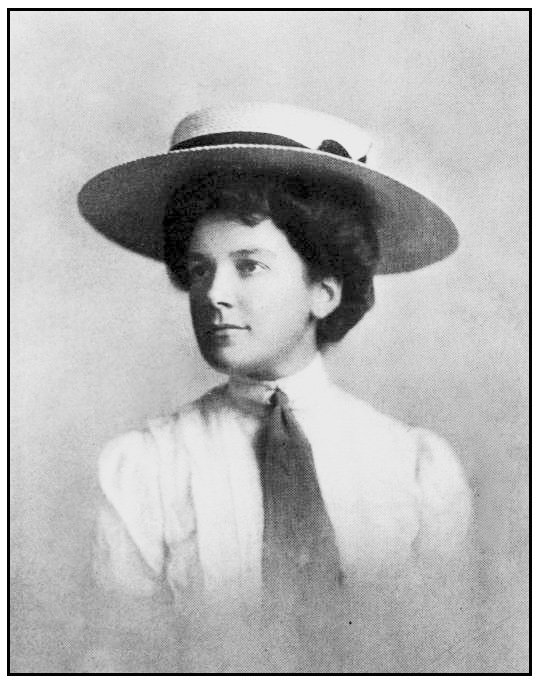
- Campbell in 1909

Personal information
- Full name: Dorothy Campbell Hurd Howe
- Nationality: Scotland; United States
- Born: 24 March 1883 North Berwick, Scotland
- Died: 20 March 1945 (aged 61) Yemassee, South Carolina, U.S.
- Spouses: Jack V. Hurd (m. 1913–1923; divorced); Edward Howe (m. 1937–1943; divorced)

Career
- Sport: Golf
- Status: Amateur

Achievements and awards
- World Golf Hall of Fame: 1978 (member page)

Dorothy Lee Campbell (24 March 1883 – 20 March 1945) was a Scottish amateur golfer. Campbell was the first woman to win the American, British and Canadian Women's Amateurs.

== Early life ==
She was born into a golfing family in North Berwick, Midlothian, Scotland, to William Spink Campbell (1833–1900) and Emily Mary Tipper (1834–1923). She began swinging golf clubs when she was just 18 months old. Within a few years she was competing with her sisters. She was a short but straight hitter of the ball who used an unorthodox hooker's grip. Later in her career she would adopt the standard "Vardon grip".

In 1896, at age 13, she joined the North Berwick Ladies Golf Club and had no difficulty holding her own against adult members. She was a pupil of golf professional Ben Sayers and learned to play the game over the North Berwick West Links. Her father died on 30 April 1900. She was 17 and by 1904 she was living with her mother at Inchgarry House, Links Road, North Berwick, where the Campbell family had enjoyed a number of summer holidays.

== Golf career ==
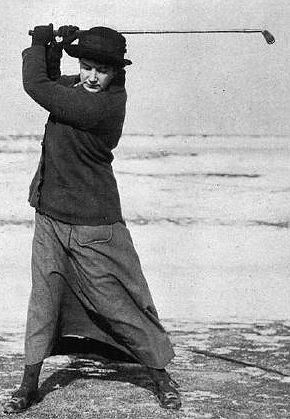
Campbell at the top of her backswing, c. 1912

In the British Ladies Amateur, contested at Royal Birkdale in 1909, Campbell forgot to report the result of her third round match—which she won on the 11th green—to the LGU officials who met to discuss whether she would be disqualified. She was allowed to continue in the championship which she won, beating Ireland's Florence Hezlet 4 and 3. That victory earned her an invitation to play in America and changed the course of her life. Subsequently, she returned to Britain only as a visitor. She moved to Canada in 1910 and three years later moved to the United States permanently and became an American citizen.

In the 1911 British Ladies Amateur, she defeated Violet Hezlet, Florence's sister, in the final at Portrush. That same year, Campbell won the inaugural Berthellyn Cup at the Huntingdon Valley Country Club, just north of Philadelphia. The event would be held until 1941 with Campbell winning the prestigious event four times.

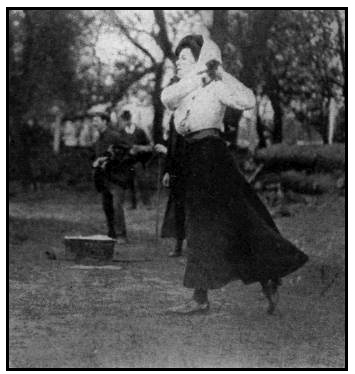
Campbell prior to her 1909 victories

Ben Sayers, golf instructor of Campbell at North Berwick

Over the course of her career, she won 11 national amateur crowns between Great Britain, the United States, Canada, and Scotland, the last of which came in 1924 at the age of 41. She won over 700 first prizes during her golf career. Her short game, according to golf writer Colin Farquharson, was "out of this world".

Mabel Stringer wrote of her short game, "Dorothy's best stroke was a run-up shot that she used from distances of up to 50 feet. She used her goose-necked mashie, which she nicknamed "Thomas", closing the small clubface and hitting the ball on the downswing. At Augusta Country Club in 1926, she holed two chip shots and ended up having a record low of 19 putts for 18 holes, lowering Walter Travis's record by two strokes for putts in one round. In the final of the (US) North and South championship she beat her opponent by twice holing out from 40 yards".

== Personal life ==
She married Jack V. Hurd in Wentworth, Ontario, Canada on 11 February 1913. Hurd was a steel magnate living in Pittsburgh, Pennsylvania, and a member of Oakmont Country Club. She won many of her titles as Mrs. J. V. Hurd, but she and Hurd were divorced in 1923. She married Edward Howe in 1937 and divorced again in 1943. She had a son, Sigourney V. Hurd (1913–1986), with Jack Hurd.

In her career she was also known in her lifetime as Dorothy Hurd, Mrs. J. V. Hurd and as Dorothy Howe. She has also been referred to by the portmanteau Dorothy Campbell Hurd Howe.

== Death ==
She died in a railway accident on 20 March 1945, falling off a platform and into the path of an oncoming train. Her death certificate shows her full name to be Dorothy Lee Howe. The principal causes of death were a skull fracture and avulsion of her right arm.

== Awards and honors ==
- In 1978, Campbell was inducted to the Canadian Golf Hall of Fame.
- In 1978, she was also inducted into the World Golf Hall of Fame.

== Amateur wins ==
- 1905 Scottish Ladies' Amateur Championship
- 1906 Scottish Ladies' Amateur Championship
- 1908 Scottish Ladies' Amateur Championship
- 1909 U.S. Women's Amateur, British Ladies Amateur
- 1910 U.S. Women's Amateur, Canadian Women's Amateur
- 1911 British Ladies Amateur, Canadian Women's Amateur, Berthellyn Cup
- 1912 Canadian Women's Amateur
- 1918 North and South Women's Amateur
- 1920 North and South Women's Amateur
- 1921 North and South Women's Amateur
- 1922 Berthellyn Cup
- 1923 Berthellyn Cup
- 1924 U.S. Women's Amateur
- 1925 Philadelphia Amateur
- 1926 Philadelphia Amateur
- 1927 Philadelphia Amateur
- 1929 Philadelphia Amateur
- 1931 Philadelphia Amateur
- 1933 Berthellyn Cup
- 1934 Philadelphia Amateur, Pennsylvania State Amateur
- 1938 U.S. Women's Senior Championship
