= List of Great Britain and Ireland Curtis Cup golfers =

This is a list of all golfers who have played in the Curtis Cup for the Great Britain and Ireland team through 2026.

== Players ==
Player	Editions
(Scotland) Wilma Aitken	1982
(England) Kim Andrew (Rostron)	1998, 2000
(England) Veronica Anstey	1956
(England) Susan Armitage	1964, 1966
(Scotland) Nan Baird (Wardlaw)	1938
(England) Pam Barton	1934, 1936
(England) Hannah Barwood	2010
(England) Linda Bayman	1988
(England) Dorothy Beck	1954^
(Republic of Ireland) Lillian Behan	1986
(England) Liz Bennett	2008
(England) Jeanne Bisgood	1950, 1952, 1954
(England) Zara Bolton	1948
(England) Angela Bonallack (Ward)	1956, 1958, 1960, 1962, 1964, 1966
(England) Sally Bonallack	1962
(Scotland) Carly Booth	2008
(Wales) Amy Boulden	2012
(Wales) Becky Brewerton	2000
(Scotland) Eilidh Briggs	2014
(England) Fiona Brown	1998, 2000
(Republic of Ireland) Ita Burke	1966
(England) Nicola Buxton	1992
(Republic of Ireland) Sara Byrne	2024
(Scotland) Suzanne Cadden	1976
(Scotland) Krystle Caithness	2008
(England) Carole Caldwell	1978, 1980
(England) Liz Chadwick	1966
(England) Doris Chambers	1934^
(England) Holly Clyburn	2010, 2012
(England) India Clyburn	2018
(Scotland) Freda Coats	1934^
(Northern Ireland) Alison Coffey	2002
(Scotland) Jane Connachan	1980, 1982
(England) Elsie Corlett	1932, 1938
(Republic of Ireland) Claire Coughlan	2004, 2006
(Northern Ireland) Beth Coulter	2024, 2026
(England) Gabriella Cowley	2014
(Scotland) Hannah Darling	2021, 2022, 2024
(Wales) Karen Davies	1986, 1988
(England) Laura Davies	1984
(Republic of Ireland) Tara Delaney	2006
(Wales) Lisa Dermott	1996
(England) Annabel Dimmock	2014
(England) Helen Dobson	1990
(Scotland) Jean Donald (Anderson)	1948, 1950, 1952
(Republic of Ireland) Aine Donegan	2024
(England) Kitrina Douglas	1982
(Scotland) Gemma Dryburgh	2014
(England) Emma Duggleby	2000, 2002, 2004
(Scotland) Louise Duncan	2021, 2022
(Republic of Ireland) Maria Dunne	2016
(England) Lisa Educate (Walton)	1994, 1996
(England) Naomi Edwards	2006
(England) Mary Everard	1970, 1972, 1974, 1978
(England) Jodi Ewart	2008
(Scotland) Elaine Farquharson	1990, 1992
(England) Diana Fishwick (Critchley)	1932, 1934, 1948^, 1950^
(England) Linzi Fletcher	1990
(Scotland) Marjory Fowler	1966
(England) Diane Robb Frearson	1962, 1972
(England) Sophia Fullbrook	2026
(England) Annabell Fuller	2018, 2021, 2022
(England) Marjorie Ross Garon	1936
(Republic of Ireland) Philomena Garvey	1948, 1950, 1952, 1954, 1956, 1960
(Republic of Ireland) Martina Gillen	2006
(England) Jacqueline Gordon	1948
(Northern Ireland) Paula Grant	2018
(England) Molly Gourlay	1932, 1934
(England) Julia Greenhalgh	1964, 1970, 1974, 1976, 1978
(England) Penny Grice	1984
(England) Caroline Hall	1992
(England) Georgia Hall	2014
(England) Julie Hall (Wade)	1988, 1990, 1992, 1994, 1996
(Scotland) Joan Hastings	1966
(England) Charlotte Heath	2021, 2022
(England) Dinah Henson (Oxley)	1968, 1970, 1972, 1976
(England) Alice Hewson	2016, 2018
(Wales) Anna Highgate	2004
(England) Lily Hirst	2026
(Scotland) Helen Holm	1936, 1938, 1948
(Republic of Ireland) Claire Hourihane	1984, 1986, 1988^, 1990
(England) Ann Howard	1956^, 1968
(England) Rebecca Hudson	1998, 2000, 2002
(England) Beverly Huke	1972
(England) Charley Hull	2012
(England) Lily May Humphreys	2018
(Scotland) Kathryn Imrie	1990
(England) Ann Irvin	1962, 1968, 1970, 1976
(England) Bridget Jackson	1958, 1964, 1968
(England) Rachel Jennings	2010
(England) Trish Johnson	1986
(Wales) Sarah Jones	2002
(Scotland) Anne Laing	2004
(Scotland) Vikki Laing	2002
(England) Sophie Lamb	2018
(England) Bronte Law	2012, 2014, 2016
(Scotland) Joan Lawrence	1964
(Scotland) Shirley Lawson	1988
(England) Carol Le Feuvre	1974
(England) Jenny Lee-Smith	1974, 1976
(Wales) Breanne Loucks	2006, 2008
(Republic of Ireland) Kitty MacCann	1952^
(England) Meghan MacLaren	2016
(Republic of Ireland) Maureen Madill	1980
(Republic of Ireland) Leona Maguire	2010, 2012, 2016
(Republic of Ireland) Lisa Maguire	2010
(Republic of Ireland) Tricia Mangan	2006
(England) Vanessa Marvin	1978
(England) Danielle Masters	2004
(England) Kiran Matharu	2006
(Scotland) Catriona Matthew (Lambert)	1990, 1992, 1994
(Scotland) Lorna McClymont	2024
(England) Isla McDonald-O'Brien	2026
(England) Caley McGinty	2021, 2022
(Scotland) Mhairi McKay	1994, 1996
(Republic of Ireland) Mary McKenna	1970, 1972, 1974, 1976, 1978, 1980, 1982, 1984, 1986
(England) Shelley McKevitt	2004
(Scotland) Myra McKinlay	1994
(Northern Ireland) Danielle McVeigh	2010
(Scotland) Shannon McWilliam	2018
(Northern Ireland) Stephanie Meadow	2012, 2014
(Northern Ireland) Olivia Mehaffey	2016, 2018
(Scotland) Hilary Monaghan	1998
(Scotland) Janice Moodie	1994, 1996
(England) Lynda Moore	1980
(England) Fame More	2002, 2004
(Wales) Becky Morgan	1998, 2000
(England) Wanda Morgan	1932, 1934, 1936
(England) Joanne Morley	1992
(England) Rochelle Morris	2016
(England) Charlotte Naughton	2026
(Republic of Ireland) Claire Nesbitt	1980
(England) Beverley New	1984
(England) Bridget Newell	1936^
(Scotland) Lesley Nicholson	2000
(Republic of Ireland) Susie O'Brien	2000
(England) Nellie Ong	2026
(Scotland) Doris Park	1932
(England) Florentyna Parker	2008
(Scotland) Moira Paterson	1952
(Scotland) Marjorie Peel	1954
(England) Kathryn Phillips	1970, 1972
(England) Margaret Pickard (Nichol)	1968, 1970
(England) Diana Plumpton	1934
(England) Ruth Porter	1960, 1962, 1964
(Republic of Ireland) Eileen Rose Power	1994
(Scotland) Pamela Pretswell	2010, 2012
(England) Elizabeth Price	1950, 1952, 1954, 1956, 1958, 1960
(England) Emily Price	2022
(England) Elaine Ratcliffe	1996, 1998
(Republic of Ireland) Clarrie Reddan (Tiernan)	1938, 1948
(England) Melissa Reid	2006
(England) Mimi Rhodes	2024
(England) Patience Rhodes	2024, 2026
(England) Jean Roberts	1962
(Scotland) Belle Robertson (McCorkindale)	1960, 1966, 1968, 1970, 1972, 1982, 1986
(Scotland) Janette Robertson (Wright)	1954, 1956, 1958, 1960
(Scotland) Alison Rose	1996, 1998
(England) Maureen Ruttle (Garrett)	1948
(England) Vivien Saunders	1968
(England) Susan Shapcott	1988
(England) Frances Smith (Stephens)	1950, 1952, 1954, 1956, 1958, 1960
(England) Kerry Smith	2002
(Scotland) Dorothea Sommerville	1958^
(England) Janet Soulsby	1982
(England) Kirsty Speak	1994
(England) Marley Spearman	1960^, 1962, 1964
(England) Anne Stant	1976
(Scotland) Gillian Stewart	1980, 1982
(Scotland) Heather Stirling	2002
(England) Karen Stupples	1996, 1998
(England) Charlotte Thomas	2014, 2016
(Wales) Tegwen Thomas (Perkins)	1974, 1976, 1978, 1980
(Wales) Vicki Thomas	1982, 1984, 1986, 1988, 1990, 1992
(Scotland) Michele Thomson	2008
(Scotland) Muriel Thomson	1978
(England) Jill Thornhill	1984, 1986, 1988
(England) Kelly Tidy	2012
(England) Nicola Timmins	2004
(England) Pam Tredinnick	1966, 1968
(England) Emily Toy	2021
(England) Angela Uzielli	1978
(Scotland) Jessie Valentine (Anderson)	1936, 1938, 1950, 1952, 1954, 1956, 1958
(England) Sheila Vaughan	1962, 1964
(England) Phyllis Wade (Wylie)	1936^, 1938
(Wales) Helen Wadsworth	1990
(England) Claire Waite	1984
(Scotland) Maureen Walker	1974
(England) Mickey Walker	1972
(Republic of Ireland) Pat Walker	1934, 1936, 1938
(Republic of Ireland) Lauren Walsh	2021, 2022
(Scotland) Charlotte Watson	1932
(Scotland) Sally Watson	2008, 2010
(England) Joyce Wethered	1932
(England) Amelia Williamson	2022
(Northern Ireland) Annabel Wilson	2021
(England) Enid Wilson	1932
(England) Lottie Woad	2024
(England) Davina Xanh	2026

^ In the final team but did not play in any matches.

The name in brackets is another surname used by the player.

== See also ==
- List of American Curtis Cup golfers
- Lists of golfers
