= Ranelagh International Cup =

Amateur team golf championship for women

Tournament information
- Location: Barn Elms, England
- Established: 1901
- Course: Ranelagh Club
- Organized by: Ladies Golf Union
- Format: Team stroke play
- Month played: April
- Final year: 1936

Final champion
- England

The Ranelagh International Cup was an amateur international team golf championship for women contested annually at the Ranelagh Club in west London, between 1901 and 1936. Generally it was played between the four Home Nations of England, Ireland, Scotland and Wales, where Ireland were represented by the whole island of Ireland on an All-Ireland basis.

The Ranelagh Club had hosted a ladies' open meeting from the mid-1890s. In 1901 an international competition was added, played concurrently with a number of other events, including a club competition. The event was held over two days. Teams of up to eight played a stroke-play round each day. The team score was determined by the leading four scores each day. Initially England, Ireland and Scotland competed with Wales first playing in 1909. Before World War I the contests were generally quite close but after the war England dominated, often winning by large margins. Scotland failed to raise a team in 1936 and later in the year the Ladies Golf Union cancelled the international event.

== Results ==
Year	Winner	Score	Runner(s)-up	Score	Refs.
1901	Ireland	689	England (Note: Wales did not compete)	702	
1902	Ireland	687	England	688	
1903	Ireland	635	England	649	
1904	England	650	Ireland	656	
1905	Ireland	689	England	692	
1906	Scotland	653	England	655	
1907	Scotland	650	England	668	
1908	Abandoned (Note: The whole meeting was abandoned because of rain.)				
1909	Scotland	639	England	644	
1910	Scotland	616	England; Ireland	631	
1911	Scotland	627	Ireland	628	
1912	England	626	Scotland	631	
1913	England	602	Scotland	625	
1914	England	582	Scotland	596	
1915–1919 Suspended during World War I
1920	England	604	Scotland	630	
1921	England	580	Scotland	605	
1922	England	600	Scotland	630	
1923	England	615	Scotland	637	
1924	England	568	Scotland	603	
1925	England	571	Wales	606	
1926	England	566	Scotland	621	
1927	England	585	Wales	602	
1928	England	579	Wales	628	
1929	England	566	Scotland	590	
1930	England	581	Ireland	608	
1931	England	558	Scotland	606	
1932	Abandoned (Note: The second day was abandoned because of flooding. The cup was not awarded, although England were leading after the first day.)				
1933	England	575	Scotland	599	
1934	England	575	Scotland	597	
1935	England	570	Scotland	601	
1936	England	553	Ireland (Note: Scotland did not compete)	592	

== Winning scores ==
The following table lists the individual scores for the winning team. Only those scores that contributed to the team score are included, the best four rounds and ties. For 1932, the first day scores for the England team are listed. England were leading by 20 strokes after the first day.

Year	Winner	Day	Score	Individual scorers	Ref
1901	Ireland	1	348	Dorothea Cuming (91), May Hezlet (87), Kathleen Prittie (88), Florence Walker-Leigh (82)	
1901	Ireland	2	341	Dorothea Cuming (88), May Hezlet (80), Kathleen Prittie (88), Florence Walker-Leigh (85)	
1902	Ireland	1	346	May Hezlet (81), Miss Jennings (89), Kathleen Prittie (86), Maud Stuart (90)	
1902	Ireland	2	341	Dorothea Cuming (89), May Hezlet (81), Kathleen Prittie (86), Florence Walker-Leigh (85)	
1903	Ireland	1	325	Dorothea Cuming (80), May Hezlet (78), Violet Hezlet (83), Mrs Jackson 84	
1903	Ireland	2	310	Dorothea Cuming (77), May Hezlet (78), Violet Hezlet (75), E C Perry (80)	
1904	England	1	320	Evelyn Morant (80), Elinor Nevile (75), Eveline Phillips (84), Grace Willock-Pollen (81)	
1904	England	2	330	Mrs Hunter (84), Evelyn Morant (83), Lottie Dod (79), Eveline Phillips (84)	
1905	Ireland	1	346	Ruth Durlacher (86), K E Gubbins (87), May Hezlet (80), Violet Hezlet (93)	
1905	Ireland	2	343	Ruth Durlacher (88), K E Gubbins (90), May Hezlet (76), Violet Hezlet (89)	
1906	Scotland	1	319	Winifred Brown (80), Dorothy Campbell (81), Molly Graham (80), Hilda Mather (78)	
1906	Scotland	2	334	Winifred Brown (81), Dorothy Campbell (85), Molly Graham (86), Hilda Mather (82)	
1907	Scotland	1	327	Mary Benton (84), Dorothy Campbell (76), Madge Neill-Fraser (84), May Nicolson (83)	
1907	Scotland	2	323	Dorothy Campbell (74), Other scores not known	
1909	Scotland	1	323	Mary Benton (82), Winifred Brown (80), Dorothy Campbell (77), Hilda Mather (84)	
1909	Scotland	2	316	Mary Benton (81), Winifred Brown (82), Dorothy Campbell (75), Katharine Stuart (78)	
1910	Scotland	1	312	Mary Benton (76), Winifred Brown (77), Katharine Stuart (78), Lena Lyndhurst Towne (81)	
1910	Scotland	2	304	Mary Benton (80), Winifred Brown (76), Elsie Kyle (74), Katharine Stuart (74), Lena Lyndhurst Towne (80)	
1911	Scotland	1	317	Scores not known	
1911	Scotland	2	310	Mary Benton (80), Winifred Brown (75), Madge Maitland (80), Katharine Stuart (75)	
1912	England	1	315	Lettie Barry (78), Eleanor Helme (79), Lily Moore (79), Gladys Ravenscroft (79)	
1912	England	2	311	Doris Chambers (78), Eleanor Helme (80), Cecil Leitch (74), Lily Moore (79)	
1913	England	1	298	Margaret Gardner (77), Cecil Leitch (69), Gladys Ravenscroft (74), Winifred Martin Smith (78), Stella Temple (78)	
1913	England	2	304	Lettie Barry (76), Cecil Leitch (78), Gladys Ravenscroft (72), Stella Temple (78)	
1914	England	1	297	Muriel Dodd (77), Ethel Marsden (74), Winifred McNair (75), Gladys Ravenscroft (71)	
1914	England	2	285	Evelyn Chubb (72), Muriel Dodd (72), Cecil Leitch (67), Elinor Nevile (74)	
1920	England	1	306	Gladys Dobell (76), Winifred Hambro (75), Molly Griffiths (78), Cecil Leitch (77)	
1920	England	2	298	Lettie Deane (77), Winifred Hambro (73), Cecil Leitch (72), Winifred McNair (76)	
1921	England	1	295	Gladys Dobell (75), Cecil Leitch (72), Winifred McNair (74), Joan Stocker (74)	
1921	England	2	285	Cecil Leitch (70), Joan Stocker (69), Joyce Wethered (74), Joy Winn (72)	
1922	England	1	309	Gladys Bastin (80), Cecil Leitch (76), Muriel Macbeth (76), Joan Stocker (80), Joyce Wethered (77)	
1922	England	2	291	Cecil Leitch (74), Muriel Macbeth (75), Winifred McNair (72), Joyce Wethered (70), Joy Winn (75)	
1923	England	1	310	Gladys Dobell (76), Molly Gourlay (76), Joan Stocker (79), Joyce Wethered (79)	
1923	England	2	305	Gladys Dobell (78), Muriel Macbeth (74), Joan Stocker (79), Joyce Wethered (74)	
1924	England	1	284	Gladys Bastin (70), Doris Chambers (73), Cecil Leitch (72), Joyce Wethered (69)	
1924	England	2	284	Gladys Bastin (71), Miss Fowler (72), Muriel Macbeth (70), Joyce Wethered (71)	
1925	England	1	288	Gladys Bastin (72), Beryl Cautley (71), Cecil Leitch (72), Joyce Wethered (73)	
1925	England	2	283	Beryl Cautley (72), Dorothy Fowler (71), Cecil Leitch (69), Joyce Wethered (71)	
1926	England	1	282	Beryl Cautley (69), Dorothy Fowler (72), Evelyn Hall (70), Cecil Leitch (71)	
1926	England	2	284	Beryl Cautley (72), Molly Gourlay (70), Evelyn Hall (70), Cecil Leitch (72)	
1927	England	1	294	Dorothy Fowler (76), Marjorie Ross Garon (71), Molly Gourlay (73), Cecil Leitch (74)	
1927	England	2	291	Beryl Cautley (74), Dorothy Fowler (70), Molly Gourlay (75), Evelyn Hall (72)	
1928	England	1	290	Marjorie Ross Garon (74), Nancye Gold (75), Molly Gourlay (71), Enid Wilson (70)	
1928	England	2	289	Marjorie Ross Garon (73), Molly Gourlay (75), Cecil Leitch (70), Enid Wilson (71)	
1929	England	1	286	Miss Fowler (71), Marjorie Ross Garon (73), Dorothy Pearson (70), Joyce Wethered (72)	
1929	England	2	280	Marjorie Ross Garon (69), Edith Guedalla (71), Joyce Wethered (70), Enid Wilson (70)	
1930	England	1	295	Marjorie Ross Garon (75), Edith Guedalla (73), Cecil Leitch (72), Dorothy Pearson (75), Enid Wilson (75)	
1930	England	2	286	Marjorie Ross Garon (75), Molly Gourlay (74), Cecil Leitch (68), Enid Wilson (69)	
1931	England	1	277	Diana Fishwick (66), Nancye Gold (71), Molly Gourlay (70), Dorothy Pearson (70)	
1931	England	2	281	Elsie Corlett (71), Nancye Gold (71), Dorothy Pearson (69), Gillian Rudgard (70)	
1932	No result	1	271	Diana Fishwick (66), Nancye Gold (69), Gillian Rudgard (68), Joy Winn (68)	
1933	England	1	286	Lady Alness (74), Beryl Brown (71), Molly Gourlay (73), Joy Winn (68)	
1933	England	2	289	Lady Alness (72), Beryl Brown (72), Molly Gourlay (72), Joy Winn (73)	
1934	England	1	286	Diana Fishwick (72), Kathleen Garnham (72), Edith Guedalla (70), Phyllis Wade (72)	
1934	England	2	289	Diana Fishwick (69), Kathleen Garnham (73), Diana Plumpton (75), Phyllis Wade (72)	
1935	England	1	284	Pam Barton (71), Diana Fishwick (71), Kathleen Garnham (69), Marjorie Ross Garon (73)	
1935	England	2	286	Diana Fishwick (73), Kathleen Garnham (74), Molly Gourlay (71), Beryl Newton (68)	
1936	England	1	283	Diana Fishwick (70), Kathleen Garnham (70), Marjorie Ross Garon (70), Beryl Newton (73)	
1936	England	2	270	Diana Fishwick (68), Kathleen Garnham (69), Marjorie Ross Garon (65), Wanda Morgan (68)	
