= Marion Miley =

American amateur golfer (1914–1941)

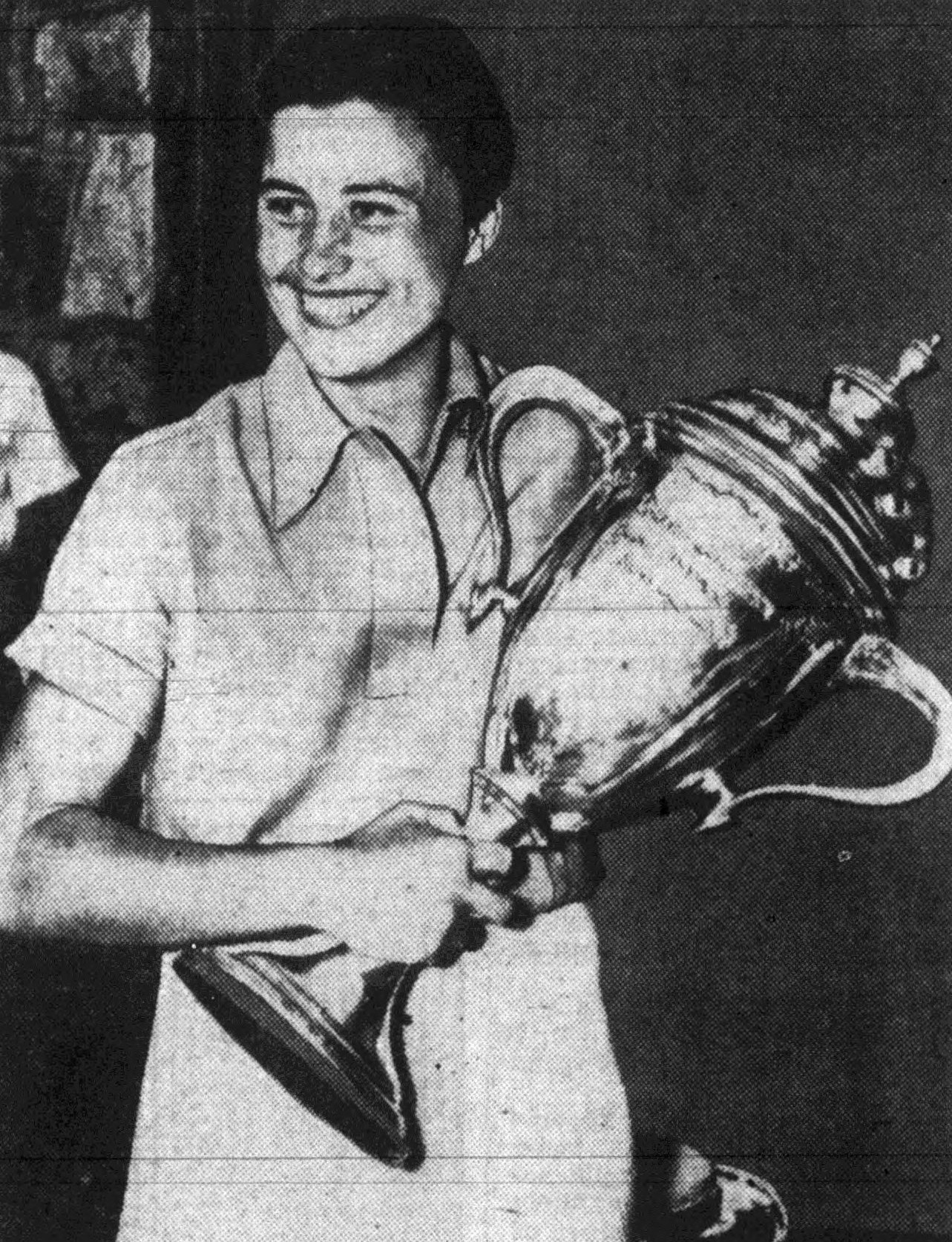
- Miley in an undated image

Personal information
- Nationality: United States
- Born: February 18, 1914 Philadelphia, Pennsylvania, U.S.
- Died: September 28, 1941 (aged 27) Lexington, Kentucky, U.S.

Career
- Sport: Golf
- College: Florida State College For Women
- Status: Amateur

Best results in LPGA major championships
- Titleholders C'ship: T3: 1939, 1941

Marion Miley (February 18, 1914 – September 28, 1941) was an American amateur golfer. Active in the 1930s, she won dozens of amateur tournaments and was ranked as high as #1 in the United States. She was noted by the press as being one of the most photogenic golfers in the world and received international acclaim from her successes both nationally and abroad, bringing attention to the sport of women's golf in the era prior to the establishment of the LPGA. She was murdered in 1941 during a robbery of the country club where she and her mother lived, dying at the age of 27; her mother also died as a result of the crime.

== Early life ==
Miley was born in Philadelphia in 1914, the only child of Fred Miley and Elsie Ego Miley. She moved with her family to Fort Pierce, Florida, in 1921, following her father's employment as a golf pro. It was in Fort Pierce that Miley first played golf, taking up the game when she was twelve years old. She attended and graduated from St. Lucie County High School before the family moved to Lexington, Kentucky in 1930, when Fred became the golf pro at the Lexington Country Club. Elsie eventually became the club's office manager and Marion continued developing her considerable golf skills under her father's instruction. Golf was only one of Marion's passions. She was very interested in music – playing the piano since she was a child – and in medicine. In numerous interviews, she expressed her long-term desire of becoming a doctor. She entered Florida State College For Women in the fall of 1930, but dropped out in 1932 after her sophomore year to focus solely on golf. With the Lexington Country Club as her home club, Marion started competing in women's amateur tournaments around the United States. Later, Standard Oil hired her in a public relations capacity to inspect gas stations and visit with local officials and business leaders. She also published articles in newspapers across the country showcasing her personal viewpoint on major tournaments in which she either previewed or participated.

== Golfing career ==
=== Early championships ===
Miley saw her first major golfing success in 1931, when she won the Kentucky Women's Amateur, a title she successfully defended the following year and six times in total throughout her life. Thanks to these prior victories, Miley qualified for and then participated in the U.S. Women's Amateur in 1933, though lost in the first round. Starting in January 1934, Miley participated in the Orange Blossom Tour in Florida for the first time, covering a number of tournaments run throughout the state and seeing great success. These included the Riviera Championship and the Augusta Invitational, where she won first place in both. The wins she made that year and the massive newspaper attention she obtained while traveling in a group with other major golfing names, including Maureen Orcutt, Grace Amory, Betty Jameson, and Patty Berg, opened Miley up for a spot on the United States team in the Curtis Cup. Because she was named as an alternate, she did not play in the competition.

=== More golf success ===
Miley's wins continued, resulting in her moving on to claim victory in the Mexican Amateur Championship in 1935, with an audience to her triumph including Bing Crosby, Joan Bennett, and W.C. Fields. She became friends with Crosby at the time and he said he would challenge her to a friendly match in the future. That same year would see her succeed in other major tournaments, such as the Women's Western Amateur and the Women's Trans-Mississippi Amateur. She took another try at the U.S. Women's Amateur near the end of the year, but lost again, this time in the quarterfinals against Charlotte Glutting. In 1936, Miley reached a major milestone in her career – the semifinals of the national amateur. She lost to Pamela Barton, a British player who would go on to win the tournament.

Miley was selected as a member of another U.S. Curtis Cup team in 1936 played in Gleneagles, Scotland. Because of lackluster play in the spring before the competition, she was once again designated as an alternate. The U.S. team was successful and claimed victory. Miley went on to play an exhibition match alongside Patty Berg and against British players Joyce Wethered and Enid Wilson, before moving to Southport, England to attend the British Ladies Amateur. She ended up being the only American still in play in the tournament leading into the quarterfinals and eventually lost in the semifinals against Bridget Newell, but received immense British media attention for the effort. This and other Florida tournament victories in 1937, such as the Augusta Invitational, resulted in Miley being officially recognized as the rank one player in the United States. Though she ended up sitting out the rest of the fall 1937 season due to undergoing an appendectomy as a "safety measure", according to her mother.

In the 1938 U.S. Women's Amateur, Miley once again reached the semifinals, but lost to Patty Berg. For the third consecutive U.S. Curtis Cup team, she was selected as a member and played in her first official matches for the team. With her teammate Kathryn Hemphill, the two women tied in a match against Phyllis Wade and J.B. Walker. Miley also played in a singles match against Elsie Corlett and won, resulting in an overall U.S. team victory. A new national ranking was released in 1938 and Miley was ranked second in the United States.

In total, Miley played in 41 major golf tournaments from 1931 to 1940, winning 22. A reporter described her as the "most photographed golfer in the world". An interview with The Courier-Journal in 1940, had her declare her goal of becoming the "best woman golfer in the world" and that she would then move on to "challenge the men". The beginning of 1941 saw her end up in a tie for the finals against Jean Bauer for a newly established invitational set in the Bahamas, where she met Edward VIII and Wallis Simpson. Afterwards, however, she had a flareup of tendonitis in her left thumb, which she stated was hampering her playing capabilities throughout the year. She would reach the semifinals of the Miami International Four-Ball, while also focusing on altering her swing in order to improve the well-being of her thumb, which was seemingly better by September. Miley competed in the U.S. Women's Amateur again in the beginning of September, but lost in the third round against heiress Sylvia Annenberg Leichner.

== Murder ==
On September 28, 1941, Miley was living in a second-floor apartment with her mother at the Lexington Country Club. A few years earlier, Fred Miley had taken a better-paying job as a golf pro at a Cincinnati club and would visit his family regularly. In a badly botched robbery, Marion was murdered at the club. Her body was discovered around five in the morning, after Miley's mother, who herself had been shot three times, crawled 200 yards (180 m) to a neighbor's house in order to get help. The killers had been attempting to rob the club after a dance had been held there the night before that was attended by famous socialites. The thieves had been unaware that the high cost of attendance was accepted on credit for many of the actual attendees and not with physical cash, resulting in them managing to steal only around $140.

Miley's funeral took place on October 1, 1941, and was attended by over 1,000 people including golfers Patty Berg and Helen Dettweiler. Soon after, Bing Crosby gave $5,000 to a reward collection for the person or people that would manage to find and capture the murderers. Her death was widely covered in contemporary news publications around the world, and the three men involved in her killing were found quickly, placed on trial on December 8, 1941, and executed on February 26, 1943.

== Legacy ==
The Lexington Country Club created the Marion Miley Memorial Golf Tournament in her memory. Another tournament called the Marion Miley Invitational was established in Kentucky. One of the awards established for the Women's Western Amateur after 1941 was named the Marion Miley Trophy. A documentary of Miley's life titled Forgotten Fame: The Marion Miley Story was released in September 2016. Miley was inducted into the Kentucky Athletic Hall of Fame in 2017.

== Championships ==
Year	Championship	Result	Score	Opponent	Ref
1931	Kentucky Women's Amateur	Win	2 and 1	(United States) Jacquiline Johnson	
1932	Kentucky Women's Amateur	Win	12 and 10	(United States) Mrs. E.D. McCraw	
1932	Women's Western Amateur	Loss (2nd round)	4 and 3	(United States) Lucille Robinson	
1933	U.S. Women's Amateur	Loss (1st round)	2 up	(United States) Mrs. Ben Fitz-Hugh	
1933	Kentucky Women's Amateur	2nd	4 and 2	(United States) Jacquiline Johnson	
1934	Miami Biltmore Women's Invitational	Semifinals	2 and 1	(United States) Helen Hicks	
1934	North and South Women's Amateur	Loss (1st round)	1 up	(United States) Sara Fownes Wadsworth	
1934	Kentucky Women's Amateur	Win	10 and 9	(United States) Elvina LeBus	
1934	Riviera Championship	Win	2 and 1	(United States) Jean Bauer	
1934	U.S. Women's Amateur	Loss (2nd round)	5 and 4	(United States) Charlotte Glutting	
1935	Augusta Invitational	Win	1 up	(United States) Peggy Wattles	
1935	South Atlantic Women's Amateur	Win	5 and 4	(United States) Jean Bauer	
1935	Mexican Women's Amateur	Win	1 up	(United States) Mrs. Paddy Newbold	
1935	Women's Western Derby	Win	3 up	(United States) Patty Berg	
1935	Kentucky Women's Amateur	Win	16 and 14	(United States) Betty Myers	
1935	Women's Western Amateur	Win	6 and 5	(United States) Mrs. Philip Atwood	
1935	Women's Trans-Mississippi Amateur	Win	9 and 7	(United States) Patty Berg	
1935	U.S. Women's Amateur	Quarterfinals	3 and 1	(United States) Charlotte Glutting	
1936	Miami Biltmore Women's Invitational	2nd	4 and 3	(United States) Patty Berg	
1936	Augusta Invitational	Loss (1st round)	1 up	(United States) Barbara Bourne	
1936	U.S. Women's Amateur	Semifinals	3 and 1	(England) Pamela Barton	
1936	British Ladies Amateur	Semifinals	4 and 3	(England) Bridget Newell	
1937	Kentucky Women's Amateur	Win	10 and 9	(United States) Jacquiline Johnson	
1937	Women's Western Amateur	Win	7 and 6	(United States) Betty Jameson	
1937	Augusta Invitational	Win	6 and 4	(United States) Babe Didrikson	
1938	Kentucky Women's Amateur	Win	10 and 9	(United States) Jacquiline Johnson	
1938	Belleair Women's Open	Win	2 and 1	(United States) Patty Berg	
1938	Women's Southern Amateur	Win	1 up	(United States) Estelle Lawson	
1938	Women's Western Amateur	Loss (2nd round)	3 and 2	(United States) Olga Strashun Weil	
1938	U.S. Women's Amateur	Semifinals	2 up	(United States) Patty Berg	
1938	Women's Trans-Mississippi Amateur	Quarterfinals	5 and 3	(United States) Sarah Guth	
1938	Aiken Round Robin Women's Invitational	Loss (4th round)	No score (injury)	(United States) Patty Berg and (United States) Jane Cothran Jameson	
1938	Mid-Florida Women's Invitational	Win	2 up	(United States) Lillian Zech	
1938	Miami Biltmore Women's Invitational	Loss (2nd round)	3 and 1	(United States) Dorothy Kirby	
1940	Augusta Invitational	Loss (1st round)	4 and 2	(United States) Louise Suggs	
1940	Augusta Invitational	Loss (1st round)	4 and 2	(United States) Louise Suggs	
1940	Belleair Women's Open	Loss (1st round)	2 and 1	(United States) Bernice Wall Barbour	
1941	Bahamas Invitational	Win	Tie	(United States) Jean Bauer	
1941	Lakeland Women's Invitational	Win	2 and 1	(United States) Mary McGarry	
1941	Miami Biltmore Women's Invitational	Semifinals	1 up	(United States) Grace Amory	
1941	U.S. Women's Amateur	Loss (3rd round)	1 up	(United States) Sylvia Annenberg Leichner	
