= Elsie Corlett =

English amateur golfer (1902–1988)

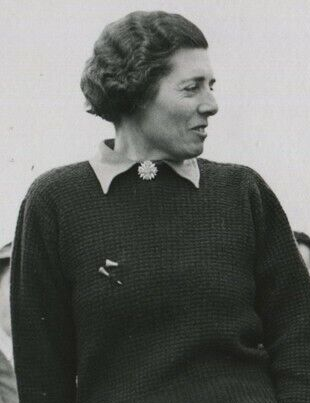
- Corlett in 1938

Personal information
- Full name: Elsie Alice Corlett
- Nationality: England
- Born: 2 September 1902 Lytham St Annes, Lancashire, England
- Died: 28 March 1988 (aged 85) Lytham St Annes, Lancashire, England

Career
- Sport: Golf
- Status: Amateur

Elsie Alice Corlett (2 September 1902 – 28 March 1988) was an English amateur golfer. She reached the final of the Women's Amateur Championship in 1938 and was a semi-finalist in 1934 and 1937. She won the English Women's Amateur Championship in 1938 and the losing finalist in 1926 and 1935. She played in the 1932 and 1938 Curtis Cup matches and was the non-playing captain in the 1964 event.

== Golf career ==
Corlett first played in the English Women's Amateur Championship in 1921 at Lytham & St Annes Golf Club, losing in the second round to Eleanor Helme, 7&6. In 1923, she played in the Women's Amateur Championship at Burnham & Berrow, losing by one hole to Jean McCulloch in the second round. She reached the last-16 of the English championship in both 1924 and 1925, losing in 1925 to Molly Gourlay.

Corlett was a surprise finalist in the 1926 English Women's Amateur Championship at Woodhall Spa. She met Molly Gourlay in the final, losing 6&4. Gourlay was one up after 8 holes of the afternoon round, but then won 5 of the next 6 holes to win the match. The final stages were played in heavy rain and Corlett was perhaps affected by the fact that she wore spectacles.

In 1927, Corlett won the Lancashire title for the first time, beating Miss Nuthall in the final. Later in 1927, she made her first appearance for England in the Women's Home Internationals. England suffered their first defeat since 1910 when they were beaten 5–4 by Scotland, and finished runners-up. Corlett won all her three matches. In 1928, she reached the quarter-finals of the Women's Amateur Championship before losing to Enid Wilson.

In 1929, Corlett regained her Lancashire title, beating Beryl Brown in the final, at the 19th hole. She also regained her place in the England team for the internationals at St Andrews. England winning all three matches.

Corlett played for the British team in an unofficial match against the United States which was played at Sunningdale Golf Club on 1 May 1930. The match was level after the foursomes, with each team winning two matches and one match halved. Britain won six of the ten singles matches to win the contest. Corlett won her foursomes matches but lost in the singles. In October, she reached the quarter-finals of the English Women's Amateur Championship at Aldeburgh, losing to Sylvia Bailey at the 19th hole.

In 1931, Corlett reached the quarter-finals of the Women's Amateur Championship before losing 5&4 to Enid Wilson, and in September lost to Wanda Morgan in the semi-finals of the English Women's Amateur Championship. In October, she played for Britain in the inaugural match against France at Oxhey Golf Club.

In May 1932, Corlett played in the inaugural Curtis Cup match at Wentworth which was won by the United States. Corlett was not selected for foursomes and lost her singles match to Leona Cheney. In 1934, Corlett was not selected for the Home Internationals but reached the semi-finals of the Women's Amateur Championship at Royal Porthcawl, losing 3&1 to Pam Barton. In July, she was chosen as first-reserve for the British team to play in the Curtis Cup at Chevy Chase, Maryland, but did not travel to the event.

In 1935, she finished tied for second place in qualifying for the Women's Amateur Championship but then lost in the first round. In October she reached the final of the English Women's Amateur Championship at Royal Lytham. Playing Marjorie Ross Garon, she lost at the 38th hole. In March 1936, Corlett was involved in trials for the Curtis Cup at Gleneagles, to be played in early May. However, she was not selected for the final team, although she was chosen for the Vagliano Trophy team in July.

Corlett played for England in the 1937 home internationals at Turnberry. However they were cancelled, after the first day, following the death of Bridget Newell in Turnberry Hotel. Newell had been due to play in the matches. Corlett had won her two matches on the first day. In the Women's Amateur Championship at Turnberry she reached the semi-finals, losing 3&2 to Doris Park. She was again in the team for the Vagliano Trophy, played later in May.

In 1938 Corlett reached the final of the Women's Amateur Championship at Burnham & Berrow, losing to Helen Holm in the 36-hole final. Corlett was two holes down after the morning round and then lost the first five holes in the afternoon to be seven down. She reduced deficit to three after 14 holes but then lost the 15th to lose the match 4&3. The following week she played in the Vagliano Trophy match in France. In late May she was selected for the Curtis Cup match at the Essex County Club in Massachusetts in early September. Britain led by 2 points after the foursomes but the United States won 5 of the 6 singles to win the match. Corlett won her foursomes match but lost in the singles. In late September she won the English Women's Amateur Championship at Aldeburgh. She met Joy Winn, in what was her third appearance in the final. Corlett was four up after the morning round but Winn had levelled the match by the 12th hole in the afternoon. Corlett then won the next two holes and eventually won 2&1. Corlett played in the Vagliano Trophy match in early June 1939, and reached the quarter-finals of the Women's Amateur Championship later in the month, losing by one hole to Beryl Newton.

In addition to her two Curtis Cup and five Vagliano Trophy appearances for the British team, Corlett played 11 times for England in the Women's Home Internationals between 1927 and 1939, missing only 1928 and 1934. Individually, she won her first 15 matches between 1927 and 1932, before she surprisingly lost by one hole to Eileen Bridge from Wales in 1933, a match that England won 8–1. She lost all three of her matches in 1935 but overall won 25 out of 32 matches she played.

== Amateur wins ==
- 1927 Lancashire Amateur Championship
- 1929 Lancashire Amateur Championship
- 1938 English Women's Amateur Championship

== Personal life ==
Corlett was born in September 1902 in Lytham St Annes, the daughter of Charles Edward Corlett, who was originally from the Isle of Man. She died in Lytham St Annes in 1988, aged 85.

== Team appearances ==
- Curtis Cup (representing Great Britain & Ireland): 1932, 1938, 1964 (non-playing captain)
- Vagliano Trophy (representing Great Britain & Ireland): 1931 (winners), 1936 (winners), 1937 (winners), 1938 (winners), 1939 (winners)
- Women's Home Internationals (representing England): 1927, 1929 (winners), 1930 (winners), 1931, 1932 (winners), 1933 (winners), 1935, 1936 (winners), 1937, 1938, 1939
