= Wanda Morgan =

English amateur golfer (1910–1995)

Personal information
- Full name: Wanda Morgan
- Nationality: England
- Born: 22 March 1910 Lymm, Cheshire, England
- Died: 8 June 1995 (aged 85) Whitstable, Kent, England

Career
- Sport: Golf

Wanda Morgan (22 March 1910 – 8 June 1995) was a leading English golfer of the 1930s. She won the Women's Amateur Championship in 1935, having been a runner-up in 1931. She also won the English Women's Amateur Championship three times, in 1931, 1936 and 1937. She played three times for Britain in the Curtis Cup, in 1932, 1934 and 1936 and for England in the Women's Home Internationals between 1931 and 1953. In early 1938 she took a paid position at Dunlop which resulted in the loss of her amateur status. She was reinstated as an amateur in 1949 but lost her amateur status again in 1954.

== Golf career ==
Morgan first came to national notice when she reached the semi-finals of the 1929 English Women's Amateur Championship at Broadstone, losing 4&3 to Molly Gourlay. She was representing the Shrub Hill club, Chestfield. Gourlay went on the win the title, beating Diana Fishwick in the final. She reached the quarter-finals in 1930 at Aldeburgh, having beaten Gourlay in the last-16. Now representing the Westgate-on-Sea club, she lost 3&2 to Enid Wilson, an ex-champion.

Morgan reached the final of the 1931 Women's Amateur Championship at Portmarnock, losing to Enid Wilson in the 36-hole final. Wilson led by one hole after the morning round but won 7&6. She had beaten Molly Gourlay by one hole in the semi-finals. Before the championship, she had made her debut in the Women's Home Internationals. In the deciding match against Scotland, she beat Doris Park, but Scotland won the match 6–3 to take the title for the first time since 1927. The English Women's Amateur Championship was held at Ganton. Morgan won the title, beating Gourlay 3&1 in the final. Later in October, she played for Britain in the inaugural match against France at Oxhey Golf Club.

In May 1932 she play in the inaugural Curtis Cup match at Wentworth. America won the match with Morgan losing both her matches. Morgan reached the quarter-finals of the Women's Amateur Championship before losing to Ina Clarke by 2 holes. Later in the year she met Molly Gourlay in the fourth round of the English Women's Amateur Championship, Gourlay winning 2&1. Morgan had less success in the important events in 1933. She was second in the qualifying for the Women's Amateur Championship but lost in the first round of the match-play to Diana Plumpton. In the English championship she lost in the second round to Dorothy Pearson, who went on to win the title.

Morgan was tied for fourth place in the qualifying for the 1934 Women's Amateur Championship but lost in the second round to Freda Coats. In July, Morgan was again selected for the British team to play in the Curtis Cup at Chevy Chase, Maryland. Britain halved the foursomes but were heavily beaten in the singles. Morgan lost both her matches.

In late May 1935 Morgan won the Women's Amateur Championship at Royal County Down. She finished fourth in the 36-hole qualifying. In the quarter-finals she had a close match against Mary Johnson, winning by one hole, and then beat Jessie Anderson 2&1 in the semi-finals. She met Pam Barton in the final, winning 3&2. In the English championship she reached the quarter-finals before losing by one hole to Sylvia Bailey.

In March 1936, Morgan was against selected for the Curtis Cup at Gleneagles, played in early May. The match resulted in a tie. Morgan halved her foursomes match but lost in the singles. In the Women's Amateur Championship she met Bridget Newell in the first round, losing 3&1. Later in the year she played Newell again, in the quarter-finals of the English Women's Amateur Championship at Hayling. Morgan won this time and then beat Molly Gourlay in the semi-finals and Phyllis Wade, the 1934 champion, 2&1 in the final, to win the title for the second time.

Morgan played for England in the 1937 home internationals at Turnberry. However they were cancelled, after the first day, following the death of Bridget Newell in Turnberry Hotel. Newell had been due to play in the matches. She had won her two matches on the first day. Morgan lost in the second round of the Women's Amateur Championship to Jean McCulloch. However she retained her English Women's Amateur Championship title, beating Madeleine Fyshe 4&2 in the final at St Enodoc in Cornwall.

Morgan played in the Women's Home Internationals each year from 1931 to 1937. She also played for Britain in the match against France each year from 1931 to 1935. She was selected in 1936 but later withdrew.

In early 1938 Morgan took a paid position with Dunlop which resulted in the loss of her amateur status. This severely restricted her playing opportunities, excluding her from the main women's events. She was able to play in the Worplesdon Mixed Foursomes, reaching the final in 1938 and, with Eustace Storey, winning the event in 1948. In 1949 she was reinstated as an amateur, following a change in her role at the firm. She was selected for the England team in the 1950 Women's Home Internationals, but later withdrew. She made a final appearance for England in the internationals in 1953. England won the title, although Morgan lost all her three matches. At the start of 1954, Morgan again lost her amateur status following a change in the rules relating to amateur status.

== Personal life ==
Morgan was born in March 1910 in Lymm, Cheshire, the daughter of Robert Hawley Morgan, an artist, and his wife née Ethel Mary Salmon. In 1921 the family moved to Whitstable, Kent. Robert died in 1954 while Ethel died in June 1960. Morgan died in June 1995.

== Team appearances ==
- Curtis Cup (representing Great Britain & Ireland): 1932, 1934, 1936 (tie)
- Vagliano Trophy (representing Great Britain & Ireland): 1931 (winners), 1932 (winners), 1933 (winners), 1934 (winners), 1935 (winners)
- Women's Home Internationals (representing England): 1931, 1932 (winners), 1933 (winners), 1934 (winners), 1935, 1936 (winners), 1937, 1953 (winners)
