= Lady's Pictorial Tournament =

Women's golf tournament

Tournament information
- Location: Stoke Poges, Buckinghamshire, England
- Established: 1911
- Course: Stoke Poges Golf Club
- Organized by: Ladies Golf Union
- Format: match play
- Month played: June/July
- Final year: 1914

The Lady's Pictorial Tournament was a women's golf tournament contested annually from 1911 to 1914. It was held at Stoke Poges Golf Club near Slough, England. There were a number of qualifying stroke play events with a total of 16 players advancing to the final match play stage. In 1911 it was called the Lady's Pictorial Coronation Cup, being played near the time of the Coronation of George V and Mary. In addition to the main scratch event there were also two handicap sections, which were played using a similar format.

In 1911 there were 8 qualifying sections with two players qualifying at each. There were three sections for England, two for Ireland and Scotland and one for Wales. In 1912 there was only one section for Ireland with England having four sections. The qualifying format was revised in 1913 with the number of qualifying events for the scratch event being reduced to two. One, for England, Ireland and Wales, was held at Worplesdon Golf Club in late April with 10 players qualifying. The Scottish qualifying, with 6 places available, was held at Machrihanish Golf Club in June, the day before the start of the Scottish Women's Amateur Championship. Qualifying for the handicap sections remained unchanged with 8 regional events. The 1914 qualifying followed a similar form to that used in 1913, although 12 qualifying places were allocated to England, Ireland and Wales and only 4 for Scotland. Qualifying took place at Woking Golf Club and Muirfield.

== Winners ==
Year	Winner	Score	Runner-up	Semi-finalists	Ref
Lady's Pictorial Coronation Cup
1911	(Scotland) Katharine Stuart	3 & 1	(England) Lily Moore	(Ireland) Ruth Durlacher, (England) Gladys Ravenscroft	
Lady's Pictorial Tournament
1912	(Scotland) Cissie Kinloch	2 & 1	(England) Gladys Heming-Johnson	(Ireland) Violet Hezlet, (England) Lily Moore	
1913	(England) Lettie Barry	1 up	(Scotland) Cissie Kinloch	(England) Beryl Cautley, (England) Gladys Ravenscroft	
1914	(England) Muriel Dodd	7 & 5	(England) Gladys Ravenscroft	(England) Cecil Leitch, (England) Winifred Martin Smith	
