= Doris Chambers =

English golfer (1884–1983)

Personal information
- Full name: Doris Elaine Chambers
- Nationality: England
- Born: 20 November 1984 Liverpool, Lancashire, England
- Died: 24 December 1983 (aged 99) London, England

Career
- Sport: Golf
- Status: Amateur

Doris Elaine Chambers (20 November 1884 – 24 December 1983) was an English amateur golfer. She won the Women's Amateur Championship in 1923, having been a semi-finalist in 1909. She also reached the semi-finals of the English Women's Amateur Championship in 1926. She represented England in the Women's Home Internationals nine times between 1906 and 1925. She was the British Curtis Cup captain in 1934, 1936 and 1948.

== Golf career ==
Chambers first reached the later stages of the Women's Amateur Championship in 1909 at Birkdale. She reached the semi-finals before losing 5&3 to Dorothy Campbell. In 1910 she lost at the last-16 stage to Violet Hezlet by one hole. She reached the last-16 again in 1921, losing 4&3 to Cecil Leitch. In 1923 Leitch was injured and Joyce Wethered was surprisingly beaten in the semi-finals by Muriel Macbeth, leaving a final between Chambers and Macbeth. In the final Macbeth was five up at one stage in the morning round but Chambers reduced the deficit to three holes by end of the round. Chambers started the afternoon well and took the lead after the 8th hole. Macbeth levelled again at the 9th and the match was then close with Chambers winning the match at the 36th hole. Later in 1923, Chambers and Macbeth met again, in the quarter-finals of the English Women's Amateur Championship, Macbeth winning this time by a score of 4&2. Defending her title in 1924, Chambers reached the last-16, where she was beaten 4&3 by Cecil Leitch. In 1925 she again reached the last-16 of the women's championship, losing to Joyce Wethered, and also reached the quarter-finals of the English championship, losing to Molly Gourlay. In 1926 she lost at the last-16 of the women's championship for the third successive year and reached the semi-finals of the English championship, losing again to Molly Gourlay, this time at the 19th hole when Gourlay holed out from 20 yards. From 1927 Chambers played less in the major events but she reached the last-16 of the women's championship in 1928 and the quarter-finals of the English championship in 1929, where she lost to Diana Fishwick.

Chambers competed for England in the Women's Home Internationals each year from 1906 to 1912, except for 1908 when she was ill. She was also ill for the 1913 matches and was left out of the team in 1914. After World War I, she competed in 1920 and again in 1924 and 1925.

In late 1933 Chambers was the captain of a British team that toured South Africa. She was chosen as the captain-manager of the 1934 Curtis Cup team. She was also the non-playing captain in the 1936 and 1948 matches.

== Personal life ==
Chambers was born in November 1884 in Liverpool, the daughter of Walter James Chambers, a wealthy shipowner. She died in London in December 1983.

== Team appearances ==
- Curtis Cup (representing Great Britain & Ireland): 1934 (captain), 1936 (tied, non-playing captain), 1948 (non-playing captain)
- Women's Home Internationals (representing England): 1906, 1907, 1909, 1910, 1911 (winners), 1912 (winners), 1920 (winners), 1924 (winners), 1925 (winners)
