= 1938 Curtis Cup =

Golf competition in Manchester-by-the-Sea, Massachusetts

Coordinates: 42.585°N 70.767°W

4th Curtis Cup Match
- Dates: September 7–8, 1938
- Venue: Essex County Club
- Location: Manchester-by-the-Sea, Massachusetts
- Captains: Frances Stebbins (USA); Margaret Wallace-Williamson (Great Britain)
(United States)	5 1/2	3 1/2	(United Kingdom)
- United States wins the Curtis Cup

The 4th Curtis Cup Match was played on September 7 and 8, 1938 at the Essex County Club in Manchester-by-the-Sea, Massachusetts. The United States won 5 1/2 to 3 1/2. Britain had led by 2 points after the foursomes but America won 5 of the 6 singles to win the match.

== Format ==
The contest was played over two days, with three foursomes on the first day and six singles matches on the second day, a total of 9 points. Matches were over 18 holes.

Each of the 9 matches was worth one point in the larger team competition. If a match was all square after the 18th hole extra holes were not played. Rather, each side earned 1/2 a point toward their team total. The team that accumulated at least 5 points won the competition.

== Teams ==
Both USA and Great Britain & Ireland selected just 7 players for the event.

Team USA
Name	Notes
Frances Stebbins	non-playing captain
Patty Berg	played in 1936
Charlotte Glutting	played in 1934 and 1936
Kathryn Hemphill
Marion Miley	played in 1934 and 1936
Maureen Orcutt	played in 1932, 1934 and 1936
Estelle Page
Glenna Vare	played in 1932 and 1936

The British team was selected in late May, during the Women's Amateur Championship.

Great Britain
Name	Notes
(Scotland) Margaret Wallace-Williamson	non-playing captain
(Scotland) Jessie Anderson	played in 1936
(Scotland) Nan Baird
(England) Elsie Corlett	played in 1932
(Scotland) Helen Holm	played in 1936
(Republic of Ireland) Clarrie Tiernan
(England) Phyllis Wade	played in 1936
(Republic of Ireland) Pat Walker	played in 1934 and 1936

== Wednesday's foursomes matches ==
	Results
Holm/Tiernan	(United Kingdom) 2 up	Page/Orcutt
Anderson/Corlett	(United Kingdom) 1 up	Vare/Berg
Walker/Wade	halved	Miley/Hemphill
2 1/2	Session	1/2
2 1/2	Overall	1/2

== Thursday's singles matches ==
	Results
Helen Holm	(United States) 6 & 5	Estelle Page
Jessie Anderson	(United States) 1 up	Patty Berg
Elsie Corlett	(United States) 2 & 1	Marion Miley
Pat Walker	(United States) 2 & 1	Glenna Vare
Clarrie Tiernan	(United Kingdom) 2 & 1	Maureen Orcutt
Nan Baird	(United States) 1 up	Charlotte Glutting
1	Session	5
3 1/2	Overall	5 1/2
