= 1946 Titleholders Championship =

Golf tournament in Augusta, Georgia, US

The 1946 Titleholders Championship was contested from April 9–12 at Augusta Country Club. It was the 7th edition of the Titleholders Championship.

This event was won by Louise Suggs.

== Round summaries ==
=== First round ===
Place	Player	Score	To par
1	(United States) Eileen Stulb	78	+3
2	(United States) Louise Suggs	80	+5
3	(United States) Dorothy Kirby	83	+8
T4	(United States) Marge Becker	84	+9
T4	(United States) Peggy Kirk	84	+9
T4	(United States) Helen Sigel	84	+9

=== Second round ===
Place	Player	Score	To par
1	(United States) Eileen Stulb	78-78=156	+6
2	(United States) Louise Suggs	80-77=157	+7
3	(United States) Dorothy Kirby	83-81=164	+14
4	(United States) Peggy Kirk	84-81=165	+15
5	(United States) Helen Sigel	84-83=167	+17
6	(United States) Marge Becker	84-85=169	+19

=== Third round ===
Place	Player	Score	To par
1	(United States) Louise Suggs	80-77-77=234	+9
2	(United States) Eileen Stulb	78-78-79=235	+10
3	(United States) Peggy Kirk	84-81-80=245	+20
4	(United States) Dorothy Kirby	83-81-84=248	+23

=== Final round ===
Place	Player	Score	To par
1	(United States) Louise Suggs	80-77-77-80=314	+14
2	(United States) Eileen Stulb	78-78-79-81=316	+16
3	(United States) Dorothy Kirby	83-81-84-80=328	+28
4	(United States) Peggy Kirk	84-81-80-84=329	+29
T5	(United States) Sally Sessions	87-86-80-83=336	+36
T5	(United States) Marge Decker	84-85-82-85=336	+36
T5	(United States) Helen Sigel	84-83-84-85=336	+36
8	(United States) Laddie Irwin	88-85-81-85=339	+39
9	(United States) Jean Hopkins	86-83-90-81=340	+40
T10	(United States) Annette Gessler	89-85-85-89=348	+48
T10	(United States) Margaret Gunther	85-88-86-89=348	+48
