= Ranelagh Club =

Polo club in south west London, England

Coordinates: 51.474°N 0.232°W

- Full name: The Ranelagh Club
- Location: Barn Elms, England
- Founded: 1878
- Closed: 1939
- Size: 130 acres
- Activities: Polo, Golf

The Ranelagh Club was a polo club located at Barn Elms in south west London, England. It was founded in 1878 as a split-off from the Hurlingham Club and by 1894 was the largest polo club in the world. The club had approximately 3000 members in 1913, including many prominent military figures and members of different royal families.

On 18 July 1878, the club became the first to host a sports match under floodlights when it played the Hurlingham Club.

At its height the Ranelagh Club consisted of a large clubhouse (the inherited manor house of Barn Elms), four polo grounds, ten croquet lawns, two tennis courts and an 18-hole golf course. From the mid-1890s the club hosted an annual ladies' open golf meeting. From 1901 to 1936 the meeting included the International Cup, contested by the Home Nations. There were also two lakes for rowing.

As the 20th century continued, the club's patronage diminished and funds dwindled. It closed shortly before World War II, and the polo grounds were used for allotments under the Dig for Victory scheme. The clubhouse burnt down in 1954. The lake was then drained, and the site converted into playing fields. Trees now cover the area which was previously occupied by the clubhouse and its gardens, and an athletics track resides on top of the drained land, reclaimed from the old lake.

The entire site now constitutes the Barn Elms open space, consisting of two separately-operated sports facilities. There is very little left to be seen of the Ranelagh Club except an ice house and a 300m long driveway entrance off the Lower Richmond Road, which now leads to the council housing of the Ranelagh estate.

== Sources ==
- Henry, Pat (self-published, 1999).The Putney Velodrome and the Putney Velodrome Estate, ISBN 0953578208
- Ranelagh Club: Rules and bye-laws, committees and list of members, London (1913)
