= Miriam Burns Horn =

American amateur golfer (1904–1951)

Personal information
- Born: Kansas City, Missouri, U.S.
- Died: March 19, 1951 Kansas City, Missouri, U.S.

Career
- Status: Amateur

Miriam Burns Horn (born Miriam Burns; later known as Miriam Burns Tyson; 1904 – March 19, 1951) was an American amateur golfer. She won the U.S. Women's Amateur in 1927 and the Women's Western Amateur in 1923 and 1930. She also won the 1927 Women's Trans-Mississippi Amateur and seven Kansas City Women's Match Play championships.

== Golf career ==
Horn was born in Kansas City, Missouri, in 1904. She developed her game under the guidance of Harry Robb Sr., the head professional at Milburn Country Club, and won her first championship at age 16. Between 1920 and 1929, she won the Kansas City Women's Match Play title seven times. Her other early titles included the 1923 Women's Western Amateur and the 1927 Women's Trans-Mississippi Amateur.

In September 1927, Horn defeated Maureen Orcutt 5 and 4 in the final at Cherry Valley Club in Garden City, New York, to win the U.S. Women's Amateur. Central Links Golf identifies her as the first USGA women's champion from west of the Mississippi River. The national title brought her national press attention. Sportswriter O. B. Keeler called her the "It Girl" of women's golf, while coverage also focused on her distinctive clothing and forthright personality.

In a 1928 Associated Press profile, Horn said that she did not expect to retain the national title but intended to try, and discussed the attention that newspapers had given to her smoking on the course.

Horn won the Women's Western Amateur for a second time in 1930 and then retired from competitive golf at age 26.

== Personal life and legacy ==
Horn had a son, Kenneth, from her first marriage. She later married George Tyson and became known as Miriam Burns Tyson. She died of pneumonia in Kansas City on March 19, 1951, at age 47. Her cremated remains were buried beside her father, Clinton S. Burns, at Forest Hill & Calvary Cemetery, but the grave remained unmarked and its location was later forgotten.

The Kansas City Sports Commission recognized Horn in 1984, and she was an inaugural inductee of the Kansas City Golf Hall of Fame in 2013. After her gravesite was rediscovered, a headstone was dedicated there on May 30, 2025, at a ceremony attended by family members and golfer Tom Watson.
