= Sally Sessions =

American golfer

Personal information
- Nationality: United States
- Born: February 22, 1923
- Died: December 23, 1966 (aged 43) Detroit, Michigan

Career
- Sport: Golf
- Turned professional: 1948
- Professional wins: 1

Best results in LPGA major championships
- Titleholders C'ship: T5: 1946
- U.S. Women's Open: T2: 1947

Sally Sessions (February 22, 1923 – December 23, 1966) was an American golfer. Sessions tied for second place in the 1947 U.S. Women's Open as an amateur, and was one of the 13 founders of the LPGA Tour in 1950.

== Early life and education ==
Sessions was born on February 22, 1923, and attended North Muskegon High School in the late 1930s. She was a tennis player in high school, winning a Michigan novice state championship when she was 16 years old; she also played basketball and softball. After Sessions was grounded for "sneaking off to play tennis in Grand Rapids", she took up golf.

== Career ==
Later, Sessions decided to pursue golf exclusively. She won a state junior title in 1941. The following year, she won the Western Michigan Women's event and made the quarterfinal round of the Women's Western Amateur. Although major golf tournaments were canceled the next few years because of World War II, Sessions remained active in local tournaments. In 1944, she was the medalist in qualifying for the Women's Western Amateur. Two years later, Sessions earned a Michigan state championship, and tied for fifth at the 1946 Titleholders Championship.

In 1947, Sessions competed in national events while retaining her amateur status. At the 1947 U.S. Women's Open, Sessions completed four 18-hole rounds in 301 strokes. Her total gave her a second-place tie with fellow amateur Polly Riley, six strokes behind winner Betty Jameson. Sessions became the Mexican Open champion later in the year, and recorded an under-par round at Pinehurst Country Club, becoming the first female player to accomplish the feat.

In early 1948, she turned professional. That year, she posted a top-10 finish in the U.S. Women's Open. In 1949, Sessions had her highest tournament finish as a professional: fifth place at the All American Open. Ill from leukemia that had not been diagnosed, she stopped playing professionally after that season.

== Later years ==
Although her career as a competitive golfer had ended, Sessions was one of the 13 founders of the LPGA Tour when the organization was formed in 1950. She was named one of the first two treasurers of the LPGA, along with Jameson. Sessions was a Wilson Sporting Goods staff professional, touring the U.S. to take part in golf clinics for the company. She became an athletic director in the Detroit school system. On December 23, 1966, she died in Detroit at the age of 43.

== Awards and honors ==
In 1987, Sessions was posthumously inducted into the Muskegon Area Sports Hall of Fame. One year later, she was inducted into the Michigan Golf Hall of Fame.

In 2023, as one of the founding LPGA members, she was announced for the Class of 2024 at the World Golf Hall of Fame.
