= English Women's Amateur Championship =

English Women’s Amateur Championship
Tournament information
- Location: England
- Established: 1912
- Organised by: England Golf
- Format: Match play

Current champion
- Ellise Rymer

The English Women's Amateur Championship is the women's national amateur match play golf championship of England. It was first played in 1912 and is currently organised by England Golf.

The English Women's Amateur Championship is contested through two phases. It begins with a 36-hole stroke play competition, with the leading 32 competitors progressing to the knock-out match play competition. All matches in the knock-out phase are played over 18 holes except the final, which is played over 36 holes.

It is a close event, entry being restricted to women born in England, or with one parent or grandparent born in England, or resident in England for five years (two years if under 18).

Joyce Wethered has been the most successful player, winning the event five times in succession from 1920 to 1924.

== History ==
The event was initially organised by the National County Golf Alliance, an organisation formed in 1911, separate from the Ladies Golf Union, with the intention of running county and national events. The first English Ladies Championship was held at Prince's Golf Club, Sandwich in April 1912. 32 players qualified for the match-play stage, after an 18-hole stroke-play round. The final was over 18 holes and was won by Margaret Gardner who beat Beryl Cautley at the 20th hole. Gardner had been 5 up with 5 holes to play, but lost them all and the match went to extra holes. The second event was held in April 1913 at Notts Golf Club and was won by Winifred Brown by one hole, the final being extended to 36 holes.

In 1914, the Ladies Golf Union wanted to organise their own English Ladies Championship and a dispute arose with the National County Golf Alliance, leading to possibility of there being two competing events. However, the Alliance was disbanded in early 1914 and the Ladies Golf Union organised the event at Walton Heath Golf Club in June. The event continued to be restricted to English golfers, using the same format as in 1913. Cecil Leitch beat Gladys Bastin 2&1 in the final.

The Ladies Golf Union continued to run the event until the English Women's Golf Association was founded in 1952. The English Women's Golf Association merged with the English Golf Union in 2011. The English Golf Union was later renamed England Golf.

From 2012 to 2018 the event was run as a 72-hole stroke-play event. It returned to match-play in 2019 with an 18-hole final. Since 2020 the event has been played concurrently with the men's event. From 2020 the final has been played over 36 holes, although the 2023 final was reduced to 18 holes by bad weather.

== Winners ==
Year	Winner	Score	Runner-up	Venue	Ref
2026	Ellise Rymer		Isabella Kent	Moor Park Golf Club	
2025	Lucy Jamieson	3&1	Grace Bowen	Royal Liverpool & Wallasey	
2024	Katie Stephens	2 up	Shivani Karthikeyan	Seaton Carew	
2023	Ellen Yates	20 holes	Rebecca Earl	Ferndown	
2022	Abbie Teasdale	1 up	Davina Xanh	Lindrick	
2021	Kirsten Rudgeley	37 holes	Isobel Wardle	Moortown	
2020	Emily Price	4 & 3	Lily May Humphreys	Woodhall Spa	
2019	Ellen Hume	19 holes	Lily May Humphreys	Saunton	

Year	Winner	Score	Margin of victory	Runner(s)-up	Venue	Ref
2018	Georgina Blackman	280	1 stroke	Annabell Fuller; Sophie Lamb	Wilmslow	
2017	Lily May Humphreys	289	2 strokes	Emma Allen; India Clyburn	Lindrick	
2016	Samantha Giles	295	1 stroke	Elizabeth Prior	West Lancs	
2015	Bronte Law	275	16 strokes	Rochelle Morris; Elizabeth Prior	Hunstanton	
2014	Bronte Law	291	3 strokes	Inci Mehmet	St Enodoc	
2013	Sarah-Jane Boyd	290	2 strokes	Alexandra Peters	King's Norton	
2012	Kelly Tidy	304	Playoff	Georgia Hall	Royal Birkdale	

Year	Winner	Score	Runner-up	Venue	Ref
2011	Lucy Williams	19 holes	Charley Hull	West Sussex	
2010	Hayley Davis	2 & 1	Tara Watters	Broadstone	
2009	Charlie Douglass	3 & 2	Tara Watters	Lindrick	
2008	Hannah Barwood	2 & 1	Florentyna Parker	Ganton	
2007	Naomi Edwards	2 & 1	Melissa Reid	Littlestone	
2006	Kiran Matharu	5 & 4	Naomi Edwards	West Lancashire	
2005	Felicity Johnson	20 holes	Sophie Walker	Burnham & Berrow	
2004	Kerry Smith	4 & 3	Shelley McKevitt	Northamptonshire County	
2003	Emma Duggleby	2 & 1	Naomi Edwards	Aldeburgh	
2002	Kerry Knowles	6 & 5	Chloe Court	Littlestone	
2001	Rebecca Hudson	20 holes	Emma Duggleby	West Sussex	
2000	Emma Duggleby	4 & 3	Rebecca Hudson	Hunstanton	
1999	Fiona Brown	2 & 1	Kerry Smith	Ganton	
1998	Elaine Ratcliffe	19 holes	Liza Walters	Walton Heath	
1997	Kim Rostron	4 & 2	Kate Burton	Saunton	
1996	Joanne Hockley	4 & 3	Lisa Educate	Silloth-on-Solway	
1995	Julie Hall	2 & 1	Elaine Ratcliffe	Ipswich	
1994	Julie Hall	1 up	Suzanne Sharpe	The Berkshire	
1993	Nicola Buxton	2 & 1	Sarah Burnell	St. Enodoc	
1992	Caroline Hall	1 up	Joanne Hockley	St. Annes Old Links	
1991	Nicola Buxton	2 up	Karen Stupples	Sheringham	
1990	Angela Uzielli	2 & 1	Linzi Fletcher	Rye	
1989	Helen Dobson	4 & 3	Simone Morgan	Burnham & Berrow	
1988	Julie Wade	19 holes	Susan Shapcott	Little Aston	
1987	Joanne Furby	4 & 3	Maria King	Alwoodley	
1986	Jill Thornhill	3 & 1	Susan Shapcott	Prince's	
1985	Trish Johnson	1 up	Linda Bayman	Ferndown	
1984	Claire Waite	3 & 2	Linda Bayman	Hunstanton	
1983	Linda Bayman	4 & 3	Christine Mackintosh	Hayling	
1982	Julie Walter	4 & 3	Christine Nelson	Brancepeth Castle	
1981	Diane Christison	2 up	Sandy Cohen	Cotswold Hills	
1980	Beverley New	3 & 2	Julie Walter	Aldeburgh	
1979	Julia Greenhalgh	2 & 1	Sue Hedges	Royal Liverpool	
1978	Vanessa Marvin	2 & 1	Ruth Porter	West Sussex	
1977	Vanessa Marvin	1 up	Mary Everard	Burnham & Berrow	
1976	Lynne Harrold	4 & 2	Angela Uzielli	Notts	
1975	Beverly Huke	2 & 1	Lynne Harrold	Royal Birkdale	
1974	Ann Irvin	1 up	Jill Thornhill	Sunningdale	
1973	Michelle Walker	6 & 5	Carol Le Feuvre	Broadstone	
1972	Mary Everard	2 & 1	Angela Bonallack	Woodhall Spa	
1971	Dinah Oxley	5 & 4	Sally Barber	Royal Liverpool	
1970	Dinah Oxley	3 & 2	Sally Barber	Rye	
1969	Barbara Dixon	6 & 4	Margaret Wenyon	Burnham & Berrow	
1968	Sally Barber	5 & 4	Dinah Oxley	Hunstanton	
1967	Ann Irvin	3 & 2	Margaret Pickard	Alwoodley	
1966	Julia Greenhalgh	3 & 1	Jean Holmes	Hayling	
1965	Ruth Porter	6 & 5	Gillian Cheetham	Whittington Barracks	
1964	Marley Spearman	6 & 5	Mary Everard	Royal Lytham & St. Annes	
1963	Angela Bonallack	7 & 6	Liz Chadwick	Liphook	
1962	Jean Roberts	3 & 1	Angela Bonallack	Woodhall Spa	
1961	Ruth Porter	2 up	Peggy Reece	Littlestone	
1960	Margaret Nichol	3 & 1	Angela Bonallack	Burnham & Berrow	
1959	Ruth Porter	5 & 4	Frances Smith	Aldeburgh	
1958	Angela Bonallack	3 & 2	Bridget Jackson	Formby	
1957	Jeanne Bisgood	10 & 8	Margaret Nichol	Queen's Park	
1956	Bridget Jackson	2 & 1	Ruth Ferguson	Hunstanton	
1955	Frances Smith	4 & 3	Elizabeth Price	Moortown	
1954	Frances Stephens	37 holes	Elizabeth Price	Woodhall Spa	
1953	Jeanne Bisgood	6 & 5	Jean McIntyre	Prince's	
1952	Pam Davies	6 & 5	Jacqueline Gordon	Royal North Devon	
1951	Jeanne Bisgood	2 & 1	Gabrielle Keiller	St Annes Old Links	
1950	Joan Gee	8 & 6	Pam Davies	Sheringham	
1949	Diana Critchley	3 & 2	Katharine Cairns	Burnham & Berrow	
1948	Frances Stephens	1 up	Zara Bolton	Hayling	
1947	Mollie Wallis	3 & 1	Elizabeth Price	Ganton	
1939–1946: Not played due to World War II
1938	Elsie Corlett	2 & 1	Joy Winn	Aldeburgh	
1937	Wanda Morgan	4 & 2	Madeleine Fyshe	St Enodoc	
1936	Wanda Morgan	2 & 1	Phyllis Wade	Hayling	
1935	Marjorie Ross Garon	38 holes	Elsie Corlett	Royal Birkdale	
1934	Phyllis Wade	4 & 3	Mary Johnson	Seacroft	
1933	Dorothy Pearson	5 & 3	Mary Johnson	Royal North Devon	
1932	Diana Fishwick	5 & 4	Beryl Brown	Royal Ashdown Forest	
1931	Wanda Morgan	3 & 1	Molly Gourlay	Ganton	
1930	Enid Wilson	12 & 11	Muriel Porter	Aldeburgh	
1929	Molly Gourlay	6 & 5	Diana Fishwick	Broadstone	
1928	Enid Wilson	9 & 8	Dorothy Pearson	Walton Heath	
1927	Edith Guedalla	1 up	Enid Wilson	Pannal	
1926	Molly Gourlay	6 & 4	Elsie Corlett	Woodhall Spa	
1925	Dorothy Fowler	9 & 7	Joy Winn	Royal North Devon	
1924	Joyce Wethered	8 & 7	Dorothy Fowler	Cooden Beach	
1923	Joyce Wethered	8 & 7	Vera Lodge	Ganton	
1922	Joyce Wethered	7 & 6	Joan Stocker	Hunstanton	
1921	Joyce Wethered	12 & 11	Marjorie Mudford	Lytham & St. Annes	
1920	Joyce Wethered	2 & 1	Cecil Leitch	Sheringham	
1919	Cecil Leitch	10 & 8	Gladys Dobell	St Annes Old Links	
1915–1918: Not played due to World War I
1914	Cecil Leitch	2 & 1	Gladys Bastin	Walton Heath	
1913	Winifred Brown	1 up	Winifred McNair	Notts	
1912	Margaret Gardner	20 holes	Beryl Cautley	Prince's	
