= 1947 U.S. Women's Open =

Coordinates: 36.076°N 79.852°W

Tournament information
- Dates: June 26–29, 1947
- Location: Greensboro, North Carolina
- Courses: Starmount Forest; Country Club
- Organized by: WPGA
- Tour: WPGA
- Format: Stroke play − 72 holes

Statistics
- Par: 76
- Length: 6,414 yards (5,865 m)
- Prize fund: $7,500
- Winner's share: $1,200

Champion
- (United States) Betty Jameson
- 295 (−9)

Location in the United States

The 1947 U.S. Women's Open was the second U.S. Women's Open, held June 26−29 at Starmount Forest Country Club in Greensboro, North Carolina.

Betty Jameson won her only U.S. Women's Open, six strokes ahead of runners-up Polly Riley and Sally Sessions, both amateurs. She entered the final round on Sunday with a two shot lead at 225 (−3) and carded a six-under 70. It was the second of her three major championships. Jameson was the runner-up the previous year, conducted in a match play format. Defending champion Patty Berg finished ninth, third among the professionals.

== Final leaderboard ==
Sunday, June 29, 1947

Place	Player	Score	To par	Money ($)
1	(United States) Betty Jameson	76-75-74-70=295	−9	1,200
T2	(United States) Polly Riley (a)	74-75-78-74=301	−3	0
T2	(United States) Sally Sessions (a)	77-76-74-74=301	−3	0
4	(United States) Louise Suggs (a)	74-76-79-73=302	−2	0
5	(United States) Estelle Page (a)	76-73-78-79=306	+2	0
6	(United States) Carol Diringer (a)	81-76-73-77=307	+3	0
7	(United States) Grace Lenczyk (a)	80-75-74-79=308	+4	0
8	(United States) Helen Dettweiler	75-84-73-77=309	+5	1,000
9	(United States) Patty Berg	74-81-79-76=310	+6	900
10	(United States) Peggy Kirk (a)	81-83-72-77=313	+9	0
