= South Hampstead High School =

Private school in South Hampstead, Greater London, England

Location
- 3 Maresfield Gardens; South Hampstead, Greater London, NW3 5SS; England; 51.5462°N 0.1773°W

Information
- Type: Private day school
- Motto: More Light (German: Mehr Licht)
- Established: 1876; 150 years ago as St. Johns Wood High School
- Local authority: London Borough of Camden
- Department for Education URN: 100076 Tables
- Ofsted: Reports
- Head teacher: Anna Paul
- Staff: circa 160
- Gender: Girls
- Age: 4 to 18
- Enrolment: 965
- Houses: Walker, Potter, Bodington, Benton,
- Colours: Gold and Navy
- Publication: The Penguin (student magazine)
- Website: www.shhs.gdst.net

South Hampstead High School is a private day school in Hampstead, north-west London, England, which was founded by the Girls' Day School Trust (GDST). It is for girls aged 4–18 with selective entry at ages 4+, 7+, 11+ and 16+ (Sixth Form).

== History ==
Founded in 1876, the ninth school established by the GDST (then known as St John's Wood High School) with 27 pupils, until 1886, the school was led by Rebecca Allen-Olney; she left to found another school nearby with her sister Sarah Allen-Olney who was assistant head. The cross-dressing Mary Benton who had previously taught at this school returned as headmistress when morale was low; the "Brigadier-General" built up the school until in the 1920s it was claimed that half of the school's students then at university were studying scientific subjects.

From 1946 until the late 1970s, it was a girls' direct grant grammar school, with around half the intake paid for by the local council.

In January 2015, alumna Helena Bonham Carter, opened a new 7-storey building for the Senior School, designed by Hopkins Architects. In January 2020, the school unveiled a new state-of-the-art performance space, Waterlow Hall.

== Staff ==
=== Headmistresses ===
- Anna Paul (2023–present)
- Victoria Bingham (2017–2023)
- Helen Pike (2013–2016)
- Jenny Stephen (2005–2013)
- Vivien Ainley (2001–2004)
- Jean Scott (1993–2001)
- Averil Burgess (1975–1993)
- Sheila Wiltshire (1969–1974)
- Prunella Bodington (1954–1969)
- Muriel Potter (1927–1953 )
- Dorothy Walker (1918–1926) (Miss McGonigle 1926 one term)
- Mary Benton (1886–1918)
- Miss Allen-Olney (1876–1886)

=== Former teachers ===
- Edith Allen, mother of food writer Raymond Postgate and Dame Margaret Cole (who married G. D. H. Cole), and wife of classicist John Percival Postgate
- Rosalind Goodfellow, who taught history
- Marianne Lutz, Headmistress from 1959–83 of Sheffield High School for Girls taught history from 1947–59.
- Margaret Nevinson, suffragette, and mother of the painter C. R. W. Nevinson (taught classics in the 1880s)
- Marie Orliac, who taught French in 1907–1910, founder of the University des Lettres Francaises (1910, Marble Arch, West London) that would become in 1913 the Institut Francais du Royaume-Uni.

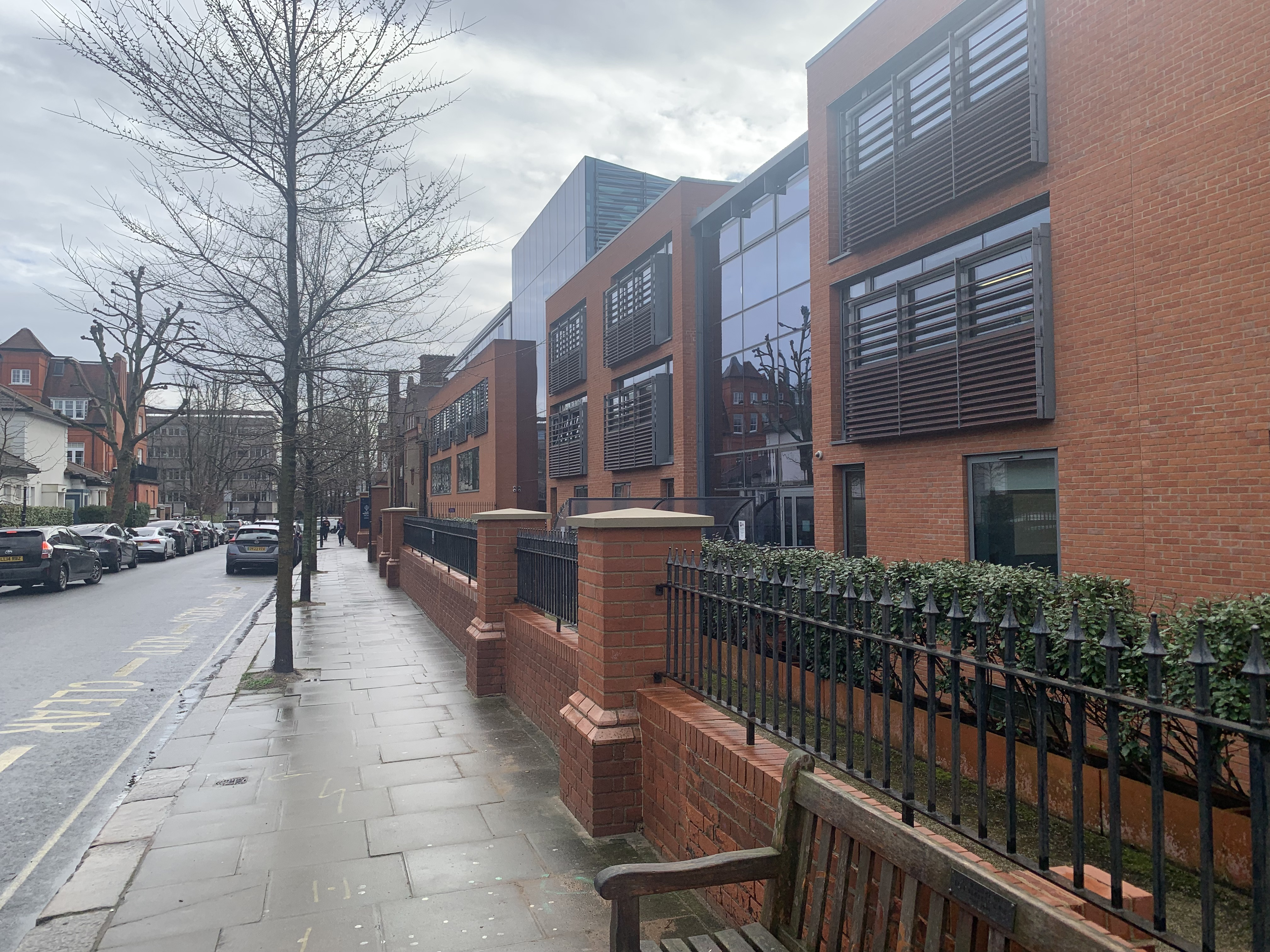
South Hampstead High School, Maresfield Gardens

== School motto ==
- "Mehr Licht" – More Light (German)—the reputed last words of Johann Wolfgang von Goethe

== Notable former pupils ==
- Katya Adler, journalist
- Julia Briggs, academic, literary critic and biographer
- Ella Bright, actress
- Helena Bonham Carter, actress
- Janet Cohen, Baroness Cohen of Pimlico, lawyer and crime fiction writer
- Lilah Fear, figure skater
- Lynne Featherstone, Baroness Featherstone, Liberal Democrat MP from 2005 to 2015 for Hornsey and Wood Green
- Naomi Ishiguro, author
- Glynis Johns, actress
- Diana Kennedy, food writer and expert on Mexican food
- Dame Angela Lansbury, actress and author
- Daisy Lowe, model
- Joanna MacGregor, pianist
- Julia Neuberger, Baroness Neuberger, rabbi
- Sarah Patterson, actress
- Margaret Quass, educationalist and activist
- Devika Rani, Bollywood actress
- Netta Rheinberg, cricketer
- Sarah Sackman, Labour MP and Solicitor-General
- Jordan Scott, filmmaker and photographer
- Rachel Sylvester, political journalist
- Fay Weldon, novelist
- Olivia Williams, actress
- Christina Larner, Historian, Author

== See also ==
- List of direct grant grammar schools
