= McVitie & Price Tournament =

Tournament information
- Location: United Kingdom
- Established: 1920
- Month played: May/June
- Final year: 1922

Final champion
- Joe Kirkwood, Sr.

The McVitie & Price Tournament was a professional golf tournament played in the United Kingdom and sponsored by McVitie & Price. The event was held from 1920 to 1922.

== History ==
Several boys lying on a knoll are watching golfers putting on a green below in the 1921 McVitie & Price Tournament at Oxhey Golf Club.

=== 1920 Tournament ===
The 1920 event had prize money of £550 and was played on 2 and 3 June. Local professional George Smith led after the first day on 145. He had a terrible second day and the tournament was eventually tied between James Braid and Abe Mitchell who shared the first and second prizes.

The tournament was preceded by an informal international match between "Scotland" and "England", played on 1 June. Matches were 36-hole fourballs. England won 7 matches to Scotland's 5 with 1 match halved. The Scottish team included two Frenchmen, Arnaud Massy and Jean Gassiat while the English team included Ángel de la Torre, a Spanish golfer.

=== 1921 Tournament ===
The 1921 event had prize money of £800 and was played on 20 and 21 May. The tournament was played at Oxhey Golf Club, which also hosted the News of the World Matchplay later the same year. Qualifying took place on 18 and 19 May, just one round per day because of the large number of entries. Joe Kirkwood, Sr. led qualifying on 149 with Arthur Havers a stroke behind. The leading 100 players qualified. The same two players, Kirkwood and Havers, led after the first day of the tournament on 145, with Abe Mitchell on 146. Havers faded on the second day and with Kirkwood having a poor final round, Mitchell won the event by 2 strokes. The final day coincided with the first match between American and British amateur golfers at Hoylake which attracted considerable interest.

=== 1922 Tournament ===
The 1922 event again had prize money of £800 and was played on 15 and 16 May. The event marked the first appearance of the year for Joe Kirkwood, Sr. Kirkwood led by 5 at the end of the first day, with Frank Ball second. Ball had a poor third round and Kirkwood eventually won by 13 strokes.

== Winners ==
Year	Winner	Country	Venue	Score	Margin of victory	Runner(s)-up	Winner's share (£)	Ref
1920	James Braid	Scotland	Moray Golf Club	292	Tie		Shared 100 and 60	
1920	Abe Mitchell	England	Moray Golf Club	292	Tie		Shared 100 and 60	
1921	Abe Mitchell	England	Oxhey Golf Club	293	2 strokes	(Australia) Joe Kirkwood, Sr.	130	
1922	Joe Kirkwood, Sr.	Australia	Moray Golf Club	300	13 strokes	(Scotland) George Duncan (England) Len Holland	150	
