= Estelle Lawson =

American amateur golfer (1907-1983)

Personal information
- Full name: Estelle Lawson Page
- Nationality: United States
- Born: March 22, 1907 East Orange, New Jersey, U.S.
- Died: May 7, 1983 (aged 76) Chapel Hill, North Carolina, U.S.

Career
- Sport: Golf
- College: University of North Carolina
- Status: Amateur

Best results in LPGA major championships
- Titleholders C'ship: 4th: 1948
- U.S. Women's Open: 5th: 1947

Estelle Page, née Lawson (March 22, 1907 – May 7, 1983) was an American amateur golfer.

== Early life ==
In 1907, Page was born. She is a native of Chapel Hill, North Carolina, her father was Bob Lawson, the first athletic director at the University of North Carolina at Chapel Hill. Page graduated from Chapel Hill High School where she played tennis and basketball.

== Golf career ==
In 1935, Lawson won her first of seven North and South Women's Amateurs at the Pinehurst Resort, a record that still stands. At that year's U.S. Women's Amateur, Page won the medal for the lowest round during the qualifying matches and won the medal again in 1937 and went on to defeat Patty Berg in the finals to win the most important amateur championship in the U.S. In 1938, at Westmoreland Country Club, the two met again in the finals, this time the victory went to Berg.

Page was part of the U.S. team that won the 1938 Curtis Cup and ten years later she was part of another Curtis Cup winning team. She won three straight North Carolina Women's Amateur Match Play Championships (1950–52), nine Women's Carolinas Amateur between 1932 and 1949. and retired with 22 tournament victories to her credit.

== Personal life ==
In 1936, she married Julius A. Page Jr. and they made their home in Chapel Hill, North Carolina.

Page died in 1983 and was interred in the Old Chapel Hill Cemetery in Chapel Hill.

== Awards and honors ==
Following the creation of the North Carolina Sports Hall of Fame in 1963, she was part of the first group to be inducted.

== Tournament wins ==
this list is incomplete

- 1932 Women's Carolinas Amateur
- 1933 Women's Carolinas Amateur
- 1935 North and South Women's Amateur
- 1936 Women's Carolinas Amateur
- 1937 North and South Women's Amateur, U.S. Amateur
- 1938 Women's Carolinas Amateur
- 1939 North and South Women's Amateur
- 1940 North and South Women's Amateur, Women's Carolinas Amateur
- 1941 North and South Women's Amateur, Women's Carolinas Amateur
- 1944 North and South Women's Amateur
- 1945 North and South Women's Amateur
- 1946 Women's Carolinas Amateur
- 1947 Women's Carolinas Amateur
- 1949 Women's Carolinas Amateur
- 1950 North Carolina Women's Amateur Match Play Championship
- 1951 North Carolina Women's Amateur Match Play Championship
- 1952 North Carolina Women's Amateur Match Play Championship

== Team appearances ==
Amateur

- Curtis Cup (representing the United States): 1938 (winners), 1948 (winners)
