= Charlotte Glutting =

American golfer (1910–1996)

Charlotte E. Glutting (1910–1996) was an American amateur golfer. Glutting played on the U.S. national team in three consecutive Curtis Cup competitions during the 1930s (1934, 1936, 1938). She played a particularly pivotal role in helping the U.S. win the 1934 and 1938 competitions. During her career in golf, Glutting won 10 amateur titles.

== Early life and education ==
Glutting was born in Newark, New Jersey on January 29, 1910. She graduated from the Beard School (now Morristown-Beard School) in 1927. In 1990, Morristown-Beard School elected Glutting to their Athletic Hall of Fame.

== Curtis Cup performance ==
Glutting captured the decisive point of the 1934 Curtis Cup to lead the American team to victory in Chevy Chase, Maryland. In 1938, she swept the last three holes in her play against British player Nan Baird to lift the U.S. team to its fourth consecutive Curtis Cup victory at the tournament in Manchester-by-the-Sea, Massachusetts. Glutting received selection to the 1940 American Curtis Cup team although the tournament did not take place because of World War II. (The Curtis Cup did not resume play until 1948 by which time Glutting had retired from golf.) The Janet A. Ginsburg Chicago Tribune Image College at Michigan State University Libraries contains the copy of the Tribune celebrating retaining the Curtis Cup in 1936. The USGA Museum contains a poster from the 1934 Curtis Cup.

== Amateur golf career ==
Glutting captured the 1934 North and South Women's Amateur played at Pinehurst Resort in Pinehurst, North Carolina. She won the New Jersey Golf Championship four times (1931, 1932, 1934, 1935) as the first player to achieve that feat. Glutting also won the Eastern Championship (1933, 1937), the Mid-South Golf Championship (1935), the Narragansett Pier Invitational Tournament (1939), and the New Jersey Shore Tournament (1935). In 1935, she reached the semi-finals of the U.S. Women's Amateur and played in the Amateur each year from 1932 to 1939. In 1936, Glutting played in the Berthellyn Cup at the Huntingdon Valley Country Club in Philadelphia. In a star studded field, Glutting reached the semifinals falling to Opal Hill.Training for this event and other tournaments, Glutting practiced at Baltusrol Golf Club in Springfield, New Jersey.

== Tennis career ==
Glutting starred in tennis during her teenage years. She gave up the sport at the age of 18 in 1929 to pursue golf full-time.

== Team appearances ==
Amateur

- Curtis Cup (representing the United States): 1934 (winners), 1936 (tie, Cup retained), 1938 (winners)
