= Dorothy Fowler =

New Zealand writer

- Occupation: Writer
- Writing career
- Period: 2009–present
- Genre: Mystery

Dorothy Fowler is a writer who lives on Waiheke Island, New Zealand. In 2009, she published her first novel, What Remains Behind (Random House, 2009), an archaeological mystery set in the Kaipara region of New Zealand.

== Life ==
Fowler lives on Waiheke Island, a gulf island in the Auckland harbour. Prior to becoming a writer, she worked in a variety of jobs including building and boatbuilding, before returning to the University of Auckland to study ancient history and archaeology. While completing her degree, she discovered she needed one final credit to graduate which prompted her to enroll in a creative writing course.

== Writing ==
Fowler studied for a master's degree in Creative Writing, and was mentored by Witi Ihimaera, and New Zealand novelist Emily Perkins. She wrote the manuscript to her debut novel as part of her course assignment, a mystery based on an archeological dig set in Whakapirau. Fowler has described her taste in fiction as 'classic whodunnits'; Dorothy L. Sayers, Agatha Christie, Ngaio Marsh, and she used her recent archaeological research from her first degree to form the basis of the research for her first novel.

== Novels ==
- 2009: What Remains Behind
