= North and South Women's Amateur Golf Championship =

The North and South Women's Amateur Golf Championship is an annual golf tournament held since 1903 at the Pinehurst Resort in Pinehurst, North Carolina. An invitational tournament, participants are chosen based upon their performance in national amateur championships and overall competitive record.

== Winners ==
- 2026 Mary Miller
- 2025 Mackenzie Lee
- 2024 Catie Craig
- 2023 Anna Morgan
- 2022 Emilia Migliaccio
- 2021 Gina Kim
- 2020 Rachel Kuehn
- 2019 Gabriela Ruffels
- 2018 Stephanie Lau
- 2017 Isabella Fierro
- 2016 Kristen Gillman
- 2015 Bailey Tardy
- 2014 Alison Lee
- 2013 Ally McDonald
- 2012 Austin Ernst
- 2011 Danielle Kang
- 2010 Cydney Clanton
- 2009 Amelia Lewis
- 2008 Kristie Smith
- 2007 Alison Walshe
- 2006 Jenny Suh
- 2005 Yani Tseng
- 2004 Morgan Pressel
- 2003 Brittany Lang
- 2002 May Wood
- 2001 Meredith Duncan
- 2000 Candy Hannemann
- 1999 Beth Bauer
- 1998 Beth Bauer
- 1997 Kerry Postillon
- 1996 Kristen Samp
- 1995 Laura Philo
- 1994 Stephanie Neill
- 1993 Emilee Klein
- 1992 Stephanie Sparks
- 1991 Kelly Robbins
- 1990 Brandie Burton
- 1989 Page Marsh
- 1988 Donna Andrews
- 1987 Carol Semple Thompson
- 1986 Leslie Shannon
- 1985 Lee Ann Hammack
- 1984 Susan Pager
- 1983 Anne Quast Sander
- 1982 Anne Quast Sander
- 1981 Patti Rizzo
- 1980 Charlotte Montgomery
- 1979 Julie Gumlia
- 1978 Cathy Sherk
- 1977 Marcia Dolan
- 1976 Carol Semple
- 1975 Cynthia Hill
- 1974 Marlene Stewart
- 1973 Beth Barry
- 1972 Jane Bastanchury Booth
- 1971 Barbara McIntire
- 1970 Hollis Stacy
- 1969 Barbara McIntire
- 1968 Alice Dye
- 1967 Phyllis Preuss
- 1966 Nancy Roth Syms
- 1965 Barbara McIntire
- 1964 Phyllis Preuss
- 1963 Nancy Roth
- 1962 Clifford Ann Creed
- 1961 Barbara McIntire
- 1960 Barbara McIntire
- 1959 Ann Casey Johnstone
- 1958 Carolyn Cudone
- 1957 Barbara McIntire
- 1956 Marlene Stewart
- 1955 Wiffi Smith
- 1954 Joyce Ziske
- 1953 Pat O'Sullivan
- 1952 Barbara Romack
- 1951 Pat O'Sullivan
- 1950 Pat O'Sullivan
- 1949 Peggy Kirk
- 1948 Louise Suggs
- 1947 Babe Zaharias
- 1946 Louise Suggs
- 1945 Estelle Lawson Page
- 1944 Estelle Lawson Page
- 1943 Dorothy Kirby
- 1942 Louise Suggs
- 1941 Estelle Lawson Page
- 1940 Estelle Lawson Page
- 1939 Estelle Lawson Page
- 1938 Jane Cothran
- 1937 Estelle Lawson Page
- 1936 Deborah Verry
- 1935 Estelle Lawson
- 1934 Charlotte Glutting
- 1933 Maureen Orcutt
- 1932 Maureen Orcutt
- 1931 Maureen Orcutt
- 1930 Glenna Collett
- 1929 Glenna Collett
- 1928 Opal Hill
- 1927 Glenna Collett
- 1926 Louise Fordyce
- 1925 Mrs. Melville Jones
- 1924 Glenna Collett
- 1923 Glenna Collett
- 1922 Glenna Collett
- 1921 Dorothy Campbell
- 1920 Dorothy Campbell
- 1919 Nonna Barlow
- 1918 Dorothy Campbell
- 1917 Elaine Rosenthal
- 1916 Nonna Barlow
- 1915 Nonna Barlow
- 1914 Florence Harvey
- 1913 Lillian B. Hyde
- 1912 Mrs. J. Raymond Price
- 1911 Louise Elkins
- 1910 Florence Vanderbeck
- 1909 Mary Fownes
- 1908 Julia R. Mix
- 1907 Molly B. Adams
- 1906 Myra D. Paterson
- 1905 Houghton Dutton
- 1904 Myra D. Paterson
- 1903 Myra D. Paterson

== See also ==
- North and South Men's Amateur Golf Championship
- North and South Open
