= Mary Benton =

- Born: 23 December 1855; Hornchurch
- Died: 28 May 1944 (aged 88)
- Other names: the Brigadier-General
- Education: Newnham College
- Occupation: headteacher
- Employer: South Hampstead High School
- Predecessor: Miss Allen-Olney
- Successor: Dorothy Walker

Mary Sophia Benton (23 December 1855 – 28 May 1944) was an English headteacher. She was the second headmistress of South Hampstead High School known for her male attire and her drive for scientific study.

== Life ==
Benton was born in 1855 near Hornchurch at Wennington that was the twin village to Rainham. Her parents were Sophia Elizabeth (born Julian) and Aaron Benton. Her mother died when she was young. She had a short experience (and dislike) of a lady-like education at Ramsgate academy for girls. She was taught by a governess at the large family farm and later Landthorpe (or Lenthorpe) House. Her governess Emily Pollett also ran a local school. before she went on to study and work in France and Germany. She gained two languages and returned to England. She went to join Newnham College which was exceptional because it offered a university level education to women even though they may have no formal academic qualifications. It has led by Jemina Clough and its academic rigour came from male tutors who were willing to donate their time to teaching women. Benton troubled Newnham's head Anne Jemima Clough as Benton adopted male dress and she refused to change her ways. Benton tried to arrange a cricket match and Clough was only able to prevent it by claiming that she was concerned for the grass. She left after a year and did not take a qualification.

Benton taught briefly at South Hampstead High School which was then known as Saint John's Wood High School. Its founding head in 1876 had been Miss Allen-Olney. Benton went on to teach at other schools. In 1876 Miss Allen-Olney had decided to leave South Hampstead High School to set up a similar school nearby. South Hampstead High School required a new head and new leadership as morale was low. Benton was chosen.

Benton was known as the "Brigadier-General" and she dressed in a suit, a collar and tie, a short haircut and homburg. She supported the cause for women's suffrage and she supported one of her teachers who was more militant. The teacher was given leave of absence while they were held at Holloway Prison. She had a chair reserved for herself in every classroom to make her visits welcome. She taught geography but she was certain that there were no subjects reserved or denied to women. Students were required to take three languages although the demand for German was relaxed after anti-German views from some of the parents during the first world war.

She retired at sometime after the end of the second world war but it seemed to take some time to organise a pension. While this was organised she took temporary work as a teacher.

== Death and legacy ==
In 1926 it was reported that half the students from the school then at university were taking scientific subjects. Benton died in 1944.
