= Maureen Orcutt =

American golfer and reporter (1907–2007)

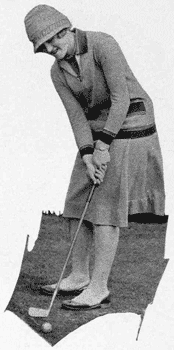

Personal information
- Born: April 1, 1907 New York City, New York, U.S.
- Died: January 9, 2007 (aged 99) Durham, North Carolina, U.S.

Career
- Sport: Golf
- Status: Amateur

Maureen Orcutt (April 1, 1907 – January 9, 2007) was an American amateur golfer and reporter for the New York Times.

== Career ==
In 1907, she was born in New York City.

Orcutt had much success at the U.S. Women's Amateur. She made it to the finals of the 1927 event but lost to Miriam Burns Horn. In 1928 and 1931 she earned medalist honors at the tournament; in 1932 she tied for this honor. In 1936, she again reached the finals but lost the to England's Pam Barton.

Orcutt won the Women's Eastern Amateur a record seven times. Her first win came in 1925 and the seventh win in 1949, 24 years later. She played on four Curtis Cup teams, winning three and tying one. She won the Canadian Women's Amateur twice and the North and South Women's Amateur at Pinehurst Resort three times in a row between 1931 and 1933. She returned to Pinehurst and won the North and South Senior Woman's Amateur in 1960, 1961 and 1962; in 2002 was named honorary chairwoman of the prestigious tournament's 100th anniversary.

Orcutt won the New York Metropolitan Golf Association title a record 10 times. The first one in 1926, the 10th one in 1968, 42 years later. She was also named the Association's Player of the Century for the 20th century.

=== Later career ===
Orcutt became a sportswriter on golfing matters in the 1920s, and eventually became only the second female sports reporter to work for The New York Times when she took over from Maribel Vinson. She finished her competitive career with over 65 tournament victories, and played the game of golf until the age of 87 when knee problems forced her to stop.

A resident of Englewood, New Jersey, she won the 1934 Democratic Party nomination for the New Jersey General Assembly to represent Bergen County.

== Personal life ==
In the 1930s, she married John D. Crews. They lived in Miami, Florida.

She resided at the Carolina House assisted living facility in Durham, North Carolina, and died there, aged 99, of congestive heart failure in 2007. She was only 12 weeks away from what would have been her 100th birthday. She had previously been a resident of Haworth, New Jersey.

== Awards and honors ==
- In 1966, Orcutt was inducted into The Hall of Fame of Women's Golf.
- In 1991, she was inducted into the New York State Hall of Fame.
- At the end of the 20th century, Orcutt was named the Metropolitan Golf Association's Player of the Century.

== Amateur wins ==
- 1925 Women's Eastern Amateur
- 1926 Metropolitan Women's Amateur
- 1927 Metropolitan Women's Amateur
- 1928 Women's Eastern Amateur, Metropolitan Women's Amateur
- 1929 Women's Eastern Amateur, Metropolitan Women's Amateur
- 1930 Canadian Women's Amateur
- 1931 North and South Women's Amateur, Canadian Women's Amateur
- 1932 North and South Women's Amateur
- 1933 North and South Women's Amateur
- 1934 Women's Eastern Amateur, Metropolitan Women's Amateur
- 1938 Women's Eastern Amateur, Metropolitan Women's Amateur
- 1940 Metropolitan Women's Amateur
- 1946 Metropolitan Women's Amateur
- 1947 Women's Eastern Amateur
- 1949 Women's Eastern Amateur
- 1960 North and South Women's Senior Amateur
- 1961 North and South Women's Senior Amateur
- 1962 U.S. Senior Women's Amateur, North and South Women's Senior Amateur
- 1966 U.S. Senior Women's Amateur
- 1959 Metropolitan Women's Amateur
- 1968 Metropolitan Women's Amateur

== Team appearances ==
Amateur

- Curtis Cup (representing the United States): 1932 (winners), 1934 (winners), 1936 (tie, Cup retained), 1938 (winners)
