= 1934 Curtis Cup =

Golf competition in Chevy Chase, Maryland

Coordinates: 38.970°N 77.089°W

2nd Curtis Cup Match
- Dates: September 27–28, 1934
- Venue: Chevy Chase Club
- Location: Chevy Chase, Maryland
- Captains: Glenna Collett-Vare (USA); Doris Chambers (Great Britain)
(United States)	6 1/2	2 1/2	(United Kingdom)
- United States wins the Curtis Cup

The 2nd Curtis Cup Match was played on September 27 and 28, 1934 at the Chevy Chase Club in Chevy Chase, Maryland. The United States won 6 1/2 to 2 1/2.

== Format ==
The contest was played over two days, with three foursomes on the first day and six singles matches on the second day, a total of 9 points. Matches were over 18 holes.

Each of the 9 matches was worth one point in the larger team competition. If a match was all square after the 18th hole extra holes were not played. Rather, each side earned 1/2 a point toward their team total. The team that accumulated at least 5 points won the competition.

== Teams ==
Eight players for the US and for Great Britain & Ireland participated in the event. The American's had a non-playing captain, Glenna Collett-Vare, while Britain's captain, Doris Chambers, was one of the team.

Team USA
Name	Notes
Glenna Collett-Vare	non-playing captain
Leona Cheney	played in 1932
Charlotte Glutting
Aniela Goldthwaite
Opal Hill	played in 1932
Marion Miley
Maureen Orcutt	played in 1932
Lucille Robinson
Virginia Van Wie	played in 1932

Marion Miley did not play any matches.

The British team was selected in July. Doris Chambers was the captain-manager. They travelled first to Canada on the SS Duchess of York.

Great Britain
Name	Notes
(England) Doris Chambers	playing captain
(England) Pam Barton
(Scotland) Freda Coats
(England) Diana Fishwick	played in 1932
(England) Molly Gourlay	played in 1932
(England) Wanda Morgan	played in 1932
(England) Diana Plumpton
(Republic of Ireland) Pat Walker

The captain, Doris Chambers, and Freda Coats did not play any matches.

== Thursday's foursomes matches ==
	Results
Barton/Gourlay	halved	Van Wie/Glutting
Fishwick/Morgan	(United States) 2 up	Orcutt/Cheney
Plumpton/Walker	(United Kingdom) 2 up	Hill/Robinson
1 1/2	Session	1 1/2
1 1/2	Overall	1 1/2

== Friday's singles matches ==
	Results
Diana Fishwick	(United States) 2 & 1	Virginia Van Wie
Pam Barton	(United States) 7 & 5	Leona Cheney
Molly Gourlay	(United States) 4 & 2	Maureen Orcutt
Wanda Morgan	(United States) 3 & 2	Charlotte Glutting
Diana Plumpton	(United States) 3 & 2	Opal Hill
Pat Walker	(United Kingdom) 3 & 2	Aniela Goldthwaite
1	Session	5
2 1/2	Overall	6 1/2
