= Phyllis Wylie =

English amateur golfer (1911–2012)

Personal information
- Full name: Phyllis Helen Wylie
- Nationality: England
- Born: 12 August 1911 Ilford, Essex, England
- Died: 3 October 2012 (aged 101) Troon, Scotland

Career
- Sport: Golf
- Status: Amateur

Phyllis Helen Wylie (née Wade; 12 August 1911 – 3 October 2012) was an English amateur golfer. She won the 1934 English Women's Amateur Championship and played in the 1938 Curtis Cup.

== Golf career ==
Wylie did not play golf until she was 16 or 17. She received regular lessons from Reg Whitcombe, who was the professional at Parkstone Golf Club from 1928.

Representing the Ferndown golf club near Bournemouth, Wylie won the Hampshire women's championship four times, in 1933, 1935, 1937 and 1938. In the 1933 British Ladies Amateur Golf Championship at Gleneagles she reached the quarter-final, losing to Doris Park at the 20th hole. She also reached quarter-finals of the English Women's Amateur Championship at Royal North Devon, losing to Mary Johnson.

In the 1934 British Ladies Amateur at Royal Porthcawl she again reached the quarter-finals, losing to the eventual winner Helen Holm at the 20th hole. She made her debut for England in the Women's Home Internationals at Royal Porthcawl and also for British team in the Vagliano Trophy match against France at Golf de Chantilly. She was selected as fourth reserve for the 1934 Curtis Cup team. Later in the year she won the English Women's Amateur at the Seacroft club, Skegness, beating Mary Johnson 4&3 in the 36-hole final.

In the second half of 1935 Wylie was one of the British team that toured Australia and New Zealand. In partnership with Ysobel Greenlees she won the New Zealand Women's Amateur Foursomes during the tour.

In March 1936, Wylie was selected for the Curtis Cup match at Gleneagles, played in early May. The match resulted in a tie, but Wylie was not selected for any matches, the same six players being chosen for the foursomes and singles. Later in 1936 Wylie reached the final of the English Women's Amateur at Hayling, losing 2&1 to Wanda Morgan. Wylie reached the quarter-finals of the English championship at St Enodoc in 1937 but lost again to Morgan.

Wylie was selected for the 1938 Curtis Cup match at the Essex County Club in Manchester-by-the-Sea, Massachusetts. Playing with Pat Walker she halved her match in the opening day foursomes. However she was not selected for the final-day singles.

Wylie reached the quarter-finals of the 1946 British Ladies Amateur at Hunstanton, losing 4&3 to Philomena Garvey. She was a regular member of the English team in the Women's Home Internationals from 1934 to 1947, making a total of 6 appearances and twice being part of the winning team. She also played 6 times in the Vagliano Trophy match against France in the same period.

== Personal life ==
Wylie was born in Essex in 1911, the daughter of Edwin and Margaret Wade. She married Surgeon-Commander John Wylie in Piccadilly, London in March 1939. After her marriage she lived in Troon, Scotland. Wylie died in Troon, Scotland in October 2012 aged 101.

== Team appearances ==
- Curtis Cup (representing Great Britain & Ireland): 1936, 1938
- Vagliano Trophy (representing Great Britain & Ireland): 1934 (winners), 1935 (winners), 1936 (winners), 1937 (winners), 1939 (winners), 1947 (winners)
- Women's Home Internationals (representing England): 1934 (winners), 1935, 1936 (winners), 1937, 1938, 1947
