= Oxhey Golf Club =

Golf club in Hertfordshire, England

Coordinates: 51.6331°N 0.3889°W

- Interactive map of Oxhey Golf Club

Club information
- Location: Watford, Hertfordshire, England
- Established: 1912
- Type: Semi-private
- Tota holes: 18
- Tournaments: McVitie & Price Tournament; News of the World Match Play
- Designed by: Harry Vardon
- Par: 72
- Length: 6,539 yd (5,979 m)

Oxhey Golf Club was a golf club located near Watford in Hertfordshire, England. The Harry Vardon designed 18-hole golf course was host to several important tournaments including the News of the World Match Play and the McVitie & Price Tournament.

== History ==
Oxhey Golf Club, located near Watford in Hertfordshire, was opened informally on 4 May 1912. The event was commemorated by a match between Harry Vardon, designer of the course, and Ted Ray, who had been appointed as the club's professional. The match was won by Ray, 4 and 2. Ray served as the club professional until 1940.

=== First World War ===
A little more than two years after the course was opened for play, the First World War began on 28 July 1914 and the war had a detrimental effect on the club, causing 58 members to resign. Of that total were eight women members who also submitted their resignations. Five of the groundskeepers joined the army and still more volunteered but were not eligible for service. Nineteen of the caddies also answered the call for military duty. The club's steward joined the Royal Marine Pension Reserve and reported for duty at Gosport.

By 5 May 1916, the war had already taken a toll on Oxhey caddies and greenkeepers with 5 casualties: 2 killed, 2 wounded, 1 prisoner. Among the club members there were 9 casualties: 3 killed, 5 wounded, 1 prisoner. In May 1917, the course had fallen into disrepair due to a lack of groundskeepers. By then some 84 members were serving in the army or navy, and a groundsman had been killed and another was a prisoner of war.

==== Poor course conditions ====
The bunkers were suffering from the play of lambs and sheep who were also drinking water from the water boxes near the tees. A fire at the club had destroyed the caddie master's and professional's shed but the structures were quickly rebuilt. The winter of 1915–16 had been very cold and it was beneficial to the course. The deep freeze helped to drain the course in the spring of 1916. In the prior year there had been mud problems on the course since there had been a three-year stretch without frost, two of which were exceptionally wet.

==== Post First World War history ====
A problem with worms on the course had erupted by May 1920 and getting rid of them had become a priority. The course was reported as being in a "shocking condition" as a result of five years of neglect of the greens and damage caused by grazing sheep. By this time the club's greenkeeper had returned to work at the course after the war but his physical condition was reported as "badly damaged". Hunters had been shooting grouse on the course but were ordered to cease.

Boys lying on a knoll watching golfers putting on a green below in the 1921 McVitie & Price Tournament at Oxhey Golf Club

By 1921, the condition of the course had been improved to the point that it was selected to host the 1921 McVitie & Price Tournament. The English professional Abe Mitchell won the 1921 tournament by two strokes from Joe Kirkwood, Sr.

=== Closure ===
In 1944, plans were approved for Oxhey Place to be redeveloped as a "cottage estate". The golf club ceased to operate on 31 October 1946. The golf course continued to be operated by the local council until it was permanently closed on 31 March 1952, with plans to convert the course and clubhouse into playing fields and a community centre.

=== Oxhey Park Golf Club ===
In 1991, a new 9-hole course was built, which opened as Oxhey Park Golf Club. It has since closed.

== Major tournaments hosted ==
Year	Tournament	Winner	Score	Margin of victory	Runner(s)-up	Ref
1921	McVitie & Price Tournament	(England) Abe Mitchell	293	2 strokes	(Australia) Joe Kirkwood Sr.	
1921	News of the World Match Play (final stage)	(England) Bert Seymour	40 holes		(Jersey) Jack Gaudin	
1923	Golf Illustrated Gold Vase	(England) Cyril Tolley	153	1 stroke	(England) W. A. Powell	
1927	Findlater Shield	(England) Jack Smith	144	6 strokes		
1930	News of the World Match Play (final stage)	(England) Charles Whitcombe	4 and 2		(England) Henry Cotton	
1936	News of the World Match Play (final stage)	(Wales) Dai Rees	1 up		(England) Ernest Whitcombe	

Oxhey was scheduled to host the final stage of the News of the World Match Play in 1914, but the tournament was cancelled following the outbreak of World War I. The club also hosted the inaugural Vagliano Trophy in 1931.

== Photo gallery ==
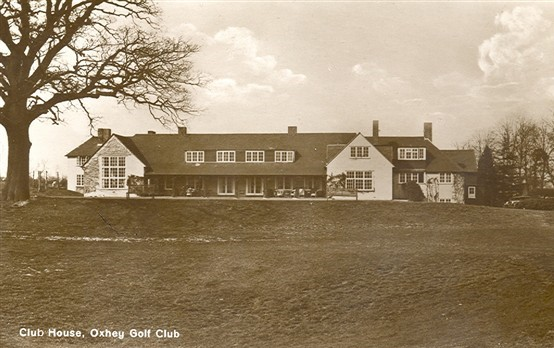
Clubhouse front

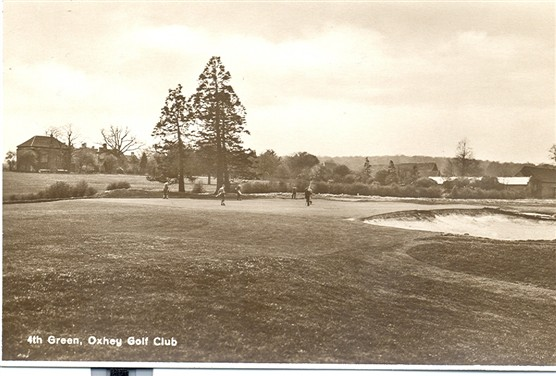
4th green

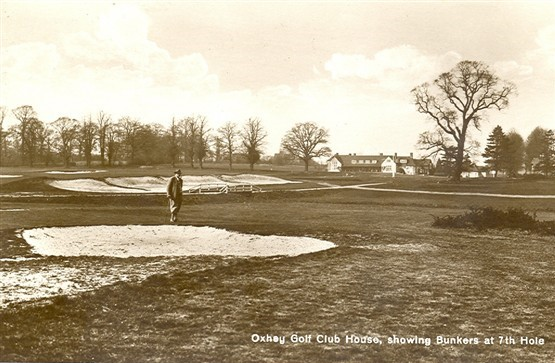
7th hole

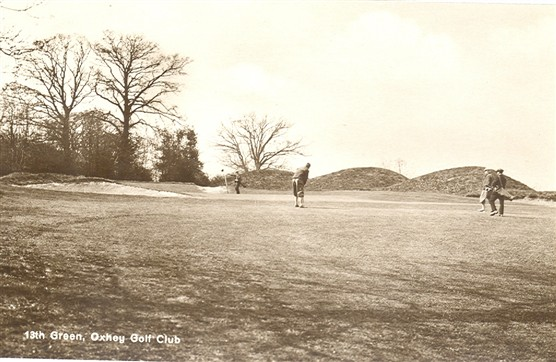
13th green

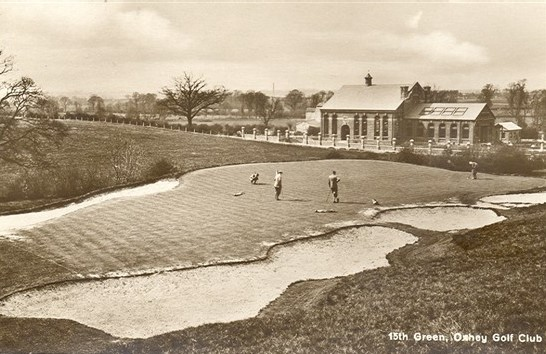
15th green

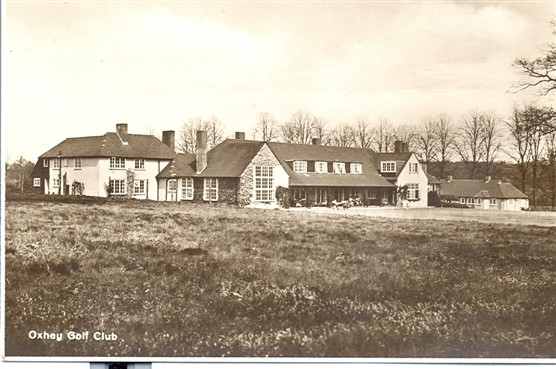
Clubhouse side view

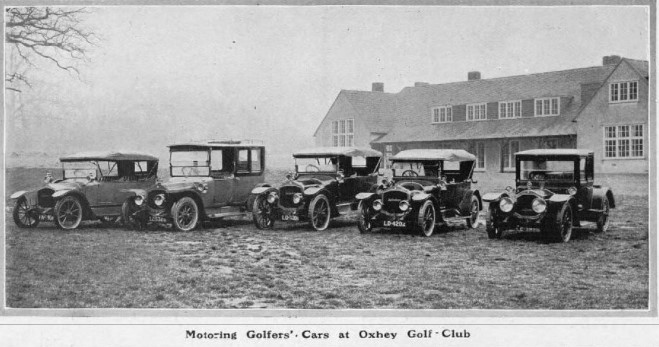
Cars parked at clubhouse

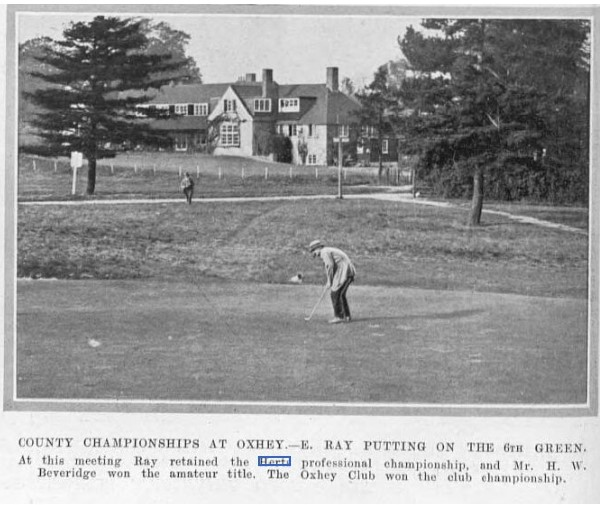
Ted Ray putting

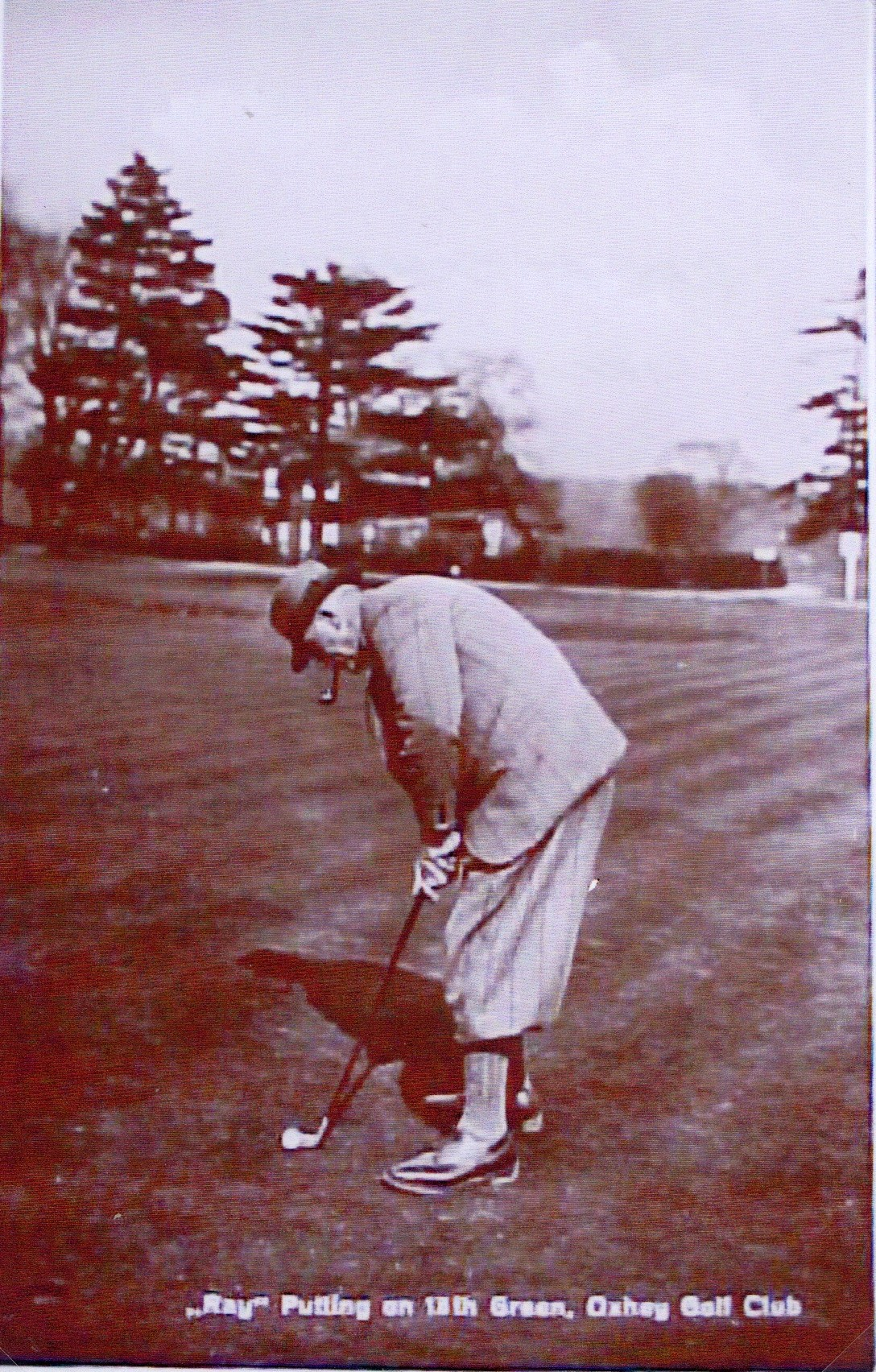
Ted Ray at Oxhey
