= 1936 Curtis Cup =

Golf competition in Auchterarder, Perthshire, Scotland

Coordinates: 56.286°N 3.748°W

3rd Curtis Cup Match
- Dates: 6 May 1936
- Venue: Gleneagles Hotel (King's Course)
- Location: Auchterarder, Perthshire, Scotland
- Captains: Doris Chambers (Great Britain); Glenna Collett Vare (USA)
(United Kingdom)	4 1/2	4 1/2	(United States)
- United States retains the Curtis Cup

The 3rd Curtis Cup Match was played on 6 May 1936 on the King's Course at Gleneagles Hotel in Auchterarder, Perthshire, Scotland. The match ended in a tie at 4 1/2 each and the United States, as the holders, retained the trophy.

The final match to finish was between Jessie Anderson and Leona Cheney. America led 4 1/2–3 1/2 and had already retained the Cup but Britain could still tie the contest. Anderson and Cheney were all square after 17 holes. Cheney took 5 at the last but Anderson holed a putt of 7 or 8 yards for a 4, to win her match and tie the contest.

== Format ==
The contest was played in a single day, with three foursomes in the morning and six singles matches in the afternoon, a total of 9 points.

Each of the 9 matches was worth one point in the larger team competition. If a match was all square after the 18th hole extra holes were not played. Rather, each side earned 1/2 a point toward their team total. The team that accumulated at least 5 points won the competition.

== Teams ==
Eight players for Great Britain & Ireland and USA participated in the event.

Great Britain
Name	Notes
(England) Doris Chambers	non-playing captain
(Scotland) Jessie Anderson
(England) Pam Barton	played in 1934
(England) Marjorie Ross Garon
(Scotland) Helen Holm
(England) Wanda Morgan	played in 1932 and 1934
(England) Bridget Newell
(England) Phyllis Wade
(Republic of Ireland) Pat Walker	played in 1934

Bridget Newell and Phyllis Wade did not play in any matches.

Team USA
Name	Notes
Glenna Collett Vare	playing captain, played in 1932
Patty Berg
Leona Cheney	played in 1932 and 1934
Maureen Crews	played in 1932 and 1934
Charlotte Glutting	played in 1934
Aniela Goldthwaite	played in 1934
Opal Hill	played in 1932 and 1934
Marion Miley	played in 1934

Aniela Goldthwaite and Marion Miley did not play in any matches.

== Morning foursomes ==
	Results
Morgan/Garon	halved	Vare/Berg
Walker/Burton	(United States) 2 & 1	Crews/Cheney
Holm/Anderson	(United Kingdom) 3 & 2	Hill/Glutting
1 1/2	Session	1 1/2
1 1/2	Overall	1 1/2

== Afternoon singles ==
	Results
Wanda Morgan	(United States) 3 & 2	Glenna Collett Vare
Helen Holm	(United Kingdom) 4 & 3	Patty Berg
Pam Barton	(United States) 1 up	Charlotte Glutting
Pat Walker	(United States) 1 up	Maureen Crews
Jessie Anderson	(United Kingdom) 1 up	Leona Cheney
Marjorie Ross Garon	(United Kingdom) 7 & 5	Opal Hill
3	Session	3
4 1/2	Overall	4 1/2
