= Gladys Ravenscroft =

British golfer

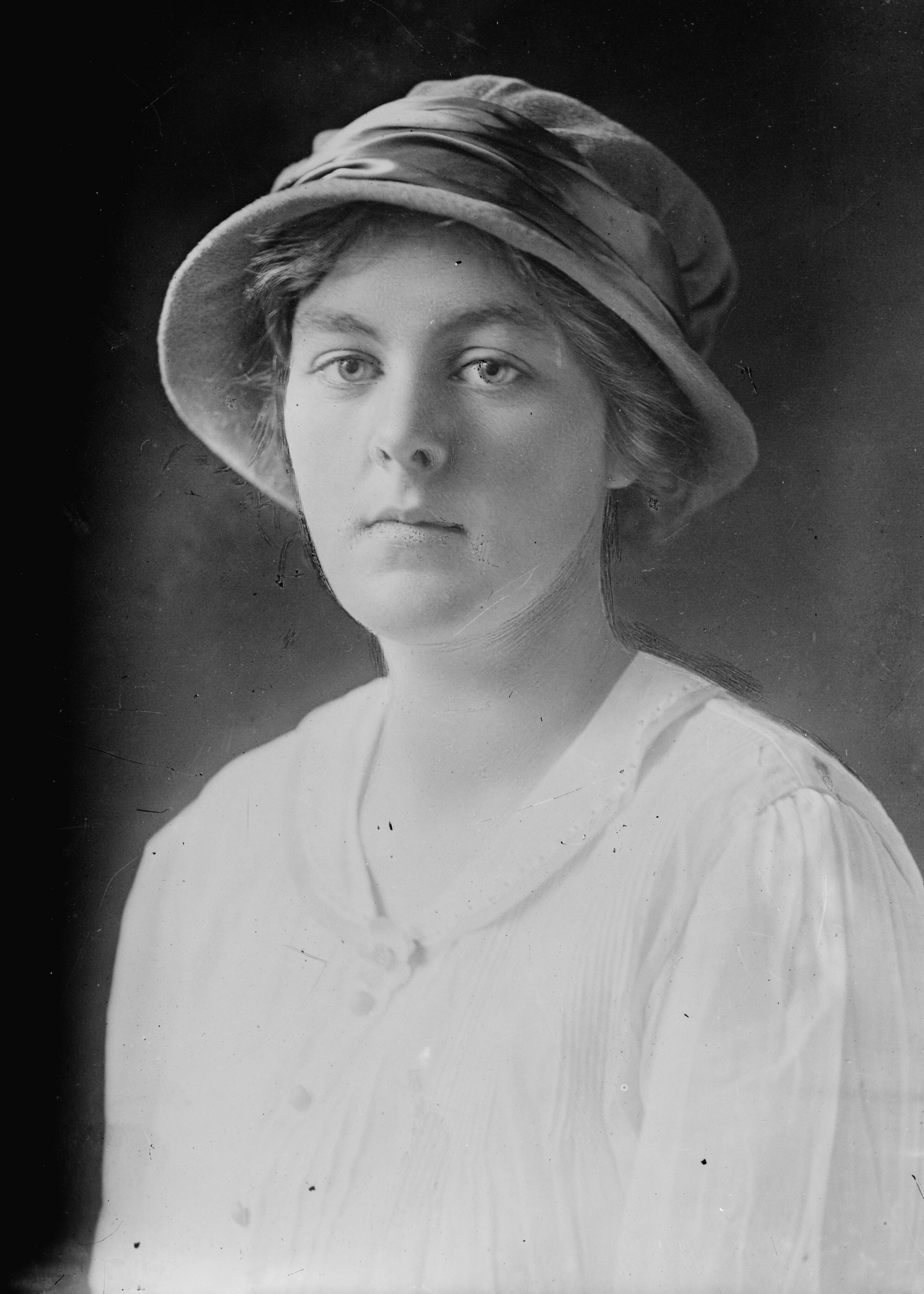
- Born: 3 May 1888; Rock Ferry, Cheshire, England
- Died: 6 February 1960 (aged 71); Willaston, Cheshire, England
- Occupation: Golfer

Gladys Ravenscroft (3 May 1888 – 6 February 1960) was a British amateur golfer.

== Career ==
In 1988, Ravenscroft was born in Cheshire, England. In 1912, she won the British Ladies Amateur at Turnberry in Scotland. In 1913 she traveled to Wilmington, Delaware to win the U.S. Women's Amateur. She defeated Muriel Dodd, then played against Marion Hollins in the finals. She was the second competitor to simultaneously hold both the American and British titles.

== Personal life ==
Gladys Ravenscroft married Temple Dobell in 1915 and resided in Wirral, England. During World War I she did volunteer service. After the war she resumed competing, and won the Cheshire ladies amateur championship on more than one occasion.

She died in 1960. Her great-nephew was the broadcaster and disc jockey John Peel.

== Amateur wins ==
- 1912 British Ladies Amateur
- 1913 U.S. Women's Amateur
