= Muriel Dodd =

English golfer

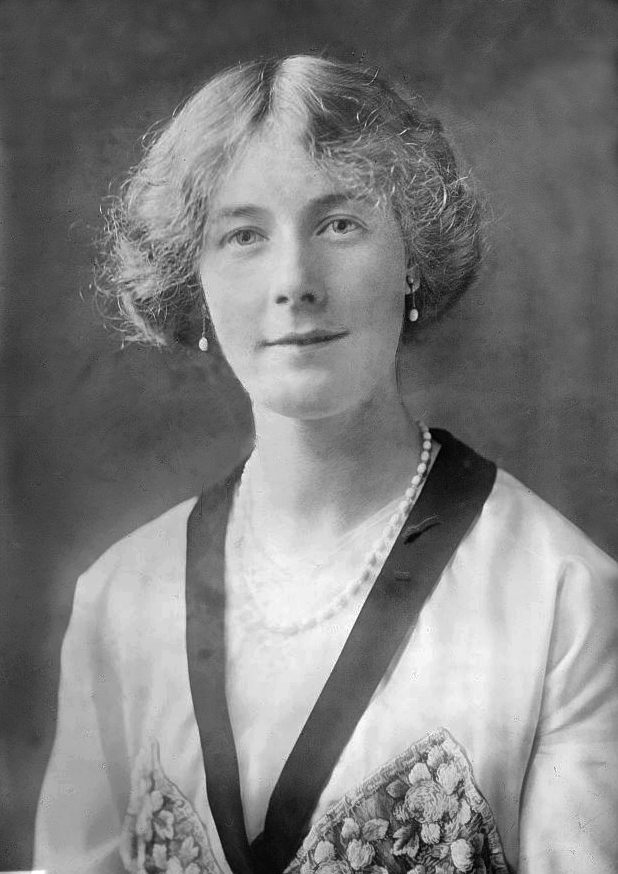
- Dodd in 1913
- Born: 31 May 1891; Crosby, Lancashire, England
- Died: 21 December 1976 (aged 85); Surrey, England

Muriel Dodd (31 May 1891 – 21 December 1976) was an English amateur golfer. She held the British and Canadian titles in 1913.

== Career ==
Dodd had much success at leading international amateur tournaments in 1913. That year Dodd was the winner of the British Ladies Amateur held at the Royal Lytham & St Annes Golf Club, taking the title from Gladys Ravenscroft. She also won the Canadian Women's Amateur in 1913. At the 1913 U.S. Women's Amateur in Wilmington, Delaware, she lost to Gladys Ravenscroft in the semi-finals.

== Personal life ==
Dodd married Lieutenant Allan Macbeth at All Soul's Church in London in May 1916. She died in Surrey in December 1976 at the age of 85.

== Amateur wins ==
- 1913 British Ladies Amateur, Canadian Women's Amateur
