= Bridget Newell =

Ursula Bridget Constance Newell, JP (1911 – 4 June 1937) was a British barrister, magistrate and amateur golfer. She was runner-up in the 1936 British Ladies Amateur, and one of the favourites for 1937. However, she died suddenly, aged 25, shortly before the 1937 tournament at Turnberry began.

== Life ==
Newell was born in Eldwick. Her father, Harold Newell of Darley Hall in Darley Dale, was a County Court judge for the Derbyshire circuit. She was called to the Bar from the Middle Temple in November 1932, aged 21. At the age of 23 she became the youngest magistrate in England, sitting on the Matlock bench.

Newell often played in pairing with Gwen Cradock-Hartopp. The couple won the Bystander Ladies' Autumn Foursomes in 1934, and reached the final of the Bystander Scottish Ladies' Foursomes in June 1935.

Newell won the Derbyshire ladies golf championship in 1935, and was Midland champion in 1936. She reached the semi-final of the French women's championship in 1936. She was in the British team against the United States in the 1936 Curtis Cup, though did not play, and played for England in the Women's Home Internationals the following week. She played for Britain against France in the Vagliano Trophy in 1936 and 1937. She was runner-up against Pam Barton in the 1936 British Ladies Amateur.

In October 1936 she was beaten by Wanda Morgan in the English Ladies Golf Championship at Hayling Island.

In June 1937, Newell was due to play in the Women's Home Internationals at Turnberry, and in the British Ladies Amateur there the following week. However, she had been suffering from tonsillitis. She practiced on the morning of 3 June, but after lunch withdrew from the England team and retired to her hotel bedroom. The Home Internationals started the next day, and Newell died that evening. She was said to have died of diphtheria although the family have always believed she died of anaphylactic shock from medicine given for her illness. As a result of her death, the Home Internationals were cancelled.

In November 1937, the Duke of Devonshire unveiled tablets to Newell's memory in St Helen's Church, Darley Dale.
