= Molly Gourlay =

British golfer

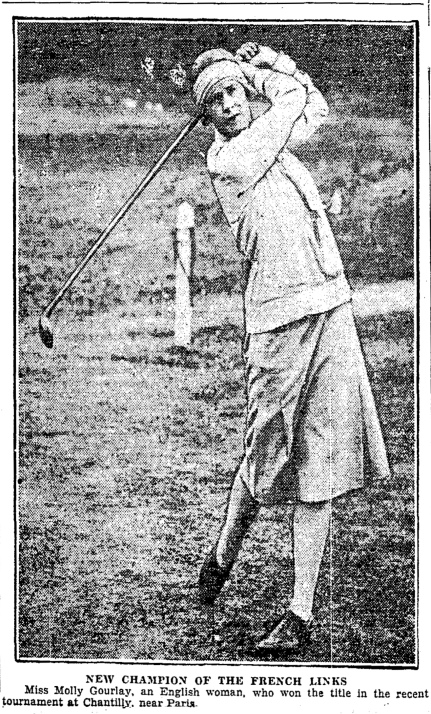
- Gourlay in 1928
- Born: Mary Perceval Gourlay; 14 May 1898; Winslade, Hampshire, England
- Died: 1 October 1990 (aged 92); Camberley, Surrey, England
- Occupation: Golfer

Mary Perceval Gourlay OBE (14 May 1898 – 1 October 1990), better known as Molly Gourlay, was a British golfer who won several international championships. She was the first female golf course architect in Britain, and after World War II was active in national ladies' golf associations.

== Early years (1898–1939) ==
Mary (Molly) Perceval Gourlay was born on the 14 May 1898 in Winslade, Hampshire. She was the eldest daughter of Henry Gourlay and Mary Henrietta Gourlay. Her mother, born Mary Henrietta Perceval, came from New Zealand. She already had two children by her first husband, Rev. Gilbert Vyvyan Heathcote. Her father, Henry Gourlay, was a ship builder from Dundee.

Before World War I, the family lived at Kempshott House in the civil parish of Dummer, Hampshire. Her father died in 1915 at their family estate in Scotland. The War Office requisitioned Kempshott house and park later in the war to house German prisoners of war.

Molly Gourlay was a member of the Sunningdale Ladies Golf Club. She played for England from 1923 to 1934. She won the ladies' championships in France and Belgium, then in 1926 won the English Ladies' Amateur Championship at Woodhall Spa. She was Captain of Surrey in 1926, 1933 and 1954. In 1932 she played in the first Curtis Cup. She played in the Curtis Cup again in 1934.

In 1927, Basingstoke Golf Club bought Kempshott Park from the Rycroft estate, but not the house. James Braid designed and built a course there in 1928. It was officially opened by Braid, Harry Vardon and Gourlay. In 1931, Gourlay moved to Camberley, her home for the rest of her life. She became a member of the Camberley Heath Golf Club. She travelled widely as a reporter for Golf Travel Weekly.

In the 1930s, Gourlay was the first female golf course architect in Britain, and worked as assistant to Tom Simpson.

== World War II (1939–1945) ==
At the start of World War II, Gourlay joined the Auxiliary Territorial Service. She became a Lieutenant Colonel in 1943. She was awarded the Order of the British Empire (OBE) for outstanding leadership.

== Later career (1945–1989) ==
In 1947, Gourlay became president of Surrey Ladies County Golf Association (SLCGA), succeeding Eleanor Helme. She held this position until 1964. She became chairman of the English Ladies' Golf Association (ELGA) in 1954. She was chairman of the Ladies' Golf Union from 1957 to 1960. She was president of ELGA from 1963 to 1965.

Gourlay died on 1 October 1990 in Camberley, Surrey at the age of 92. She is remembered on her mother's grave in St Peter's Churchyard, Frimley, Surrey.

After her death, the SLCGA instituted the Molly Gourlay Award in her memory, for the lady golfer who has made the most outstanding achievement in the county of Surrey. The trophy is a replica of her 1923 French Open Championship trophy.

== Championships ==
Gourlay won many championships in England and Europe.

- Surrey County Ladies' Golf Championship: 1923, 1926, 1927, 1931, 1933, 1934 and 1938.
- French Open Ladies' Golf Championship at Chantilly: 1923, 1928 and 1929.
- Belgium Ladies' Golf Championship: 1925 and 1926
- English Ladies' Amateur Championship: 1926 and 1929
- Swedish Ladies' Amateur Golf Championship: 1932 and 1936, finalist in 1939

== Sources ==
- Dummer Social History (PDF), The Institute of Historical Research (IHR)
- Miss Molly Gourlay, Who's Who in Sport (1926), Lambert & Butler England
- Molly Gourlay O.B.E. (PDF), SLCGA
- "USGA Celebrates Pioneers In The Women's Game In New Golf Museum Exhibit", Golf Business News, 1 August 2017
