= Pamela Barton =

English amateur golfer (1917–1943)

Personal information
- Full name: Pamela Barton
- Nationality: England
- Born: March 4, 1917 Barnes, England, U.K.
- Died: November 13, 1943 (aged 26) Kent, England, U.K.

Career
- Sport: Golf
- Status: Amateur

Pamela Espeut Barton (4 March 1917 – 13 November 1943) was an English amateur golfer.

== Career ==
In 1917, Barton was born. She was born in the London suburb of Barnes. She was the daughter of Henry Charles Johnston Barton and Ethel Maude Barton.

In 1931 saw Barton's first public appearance on a golf course at Stoke Poges Golf Club, in the Girls' Open Championship, where she came to notice for hitting the ball further than anyone else.

In 1934, aged 17, she won the French International Ladies Golf Championship and after being runner-up in 1934 and 1935. In 1936, she won the British Ladies Amateur. She then traveled to the Canoe Brook Country Club in Summit, New Jersey where she won the U.S. Women's Amateur over Maureen Orcutt. Her victory was the first by a foreign competitor in 23 years and the first time in 27 years that a player held both the British and U.S. titles simultaneously.

Barton was a member of the British team to compete in the 1934 and 1936 Curtis Cup. In 1937 her book A Stroke a Hole was published in the United Kingdom by Blackie & Son. In 1939, Barton won her second British Ladies Amateur.

Following the outbreak of World War II she immediately signed up as an ambulance driver and served in London through the Battle of Britain. In early 1941 she joined the Women's Auxiliary Air Force (WAAF) as a radio operator, later gaining a commission she served as a flight officer in command of a staff of more than 600 at RAF Manston in Kent.

== Death ==
On 13 November 1943, 26-year-old Barton was killed in an air crash at RAF Detling when a de Havilland Tiger Moth in which she was a passenger hit a fuel bowser on take-off in bad weather. She was buried with military honours at the Margate Cemetery in Margate, Kent.

Her friend and pilot of the Tiger Moth was Flight Lieutenant Angus Ruffhead survived the crash but was killed in action over France a few weeks later.

== Awards and honors ==
- In her honour, the "Pam Barton Memorial Salver" is awarded to the winner of the British Ladies Amateur Golf Championship.
- A golf course has been named after her at Royal Mid-Surrey Golf Club, Richmond.
- In his 2001 book, The Golf 100: Ranking the Greatest (Female) Golfers of All Time, Robert McCord ranked Pamela Barton 34th.
- In 2025, the Museum of Richmond included her in their exhibition "Trailblazing Women – Richmond's Sporting Superstars".

== Tournament wins ==
- 1934 French International Ladies Golf Championship
- 1936 British Ladies Amateur, U.S. Women's Amateur
- 1939 British Ladies Amateur

== Team appearances ==
Amateur

- Curtis Cup (representing Great Britain & Ireland): 1934, 1936 (tie)
- Vagliano Trophy (representing Great Britain & Ireland): 1934 (tie), 1936 (winners), 1937 (winners), 1938 (winners), 1939 (winners)

== Bibliography ==
- 1937 A Stroke a Hole, Blackie & Son
