= Enid Wilson =

English golfer

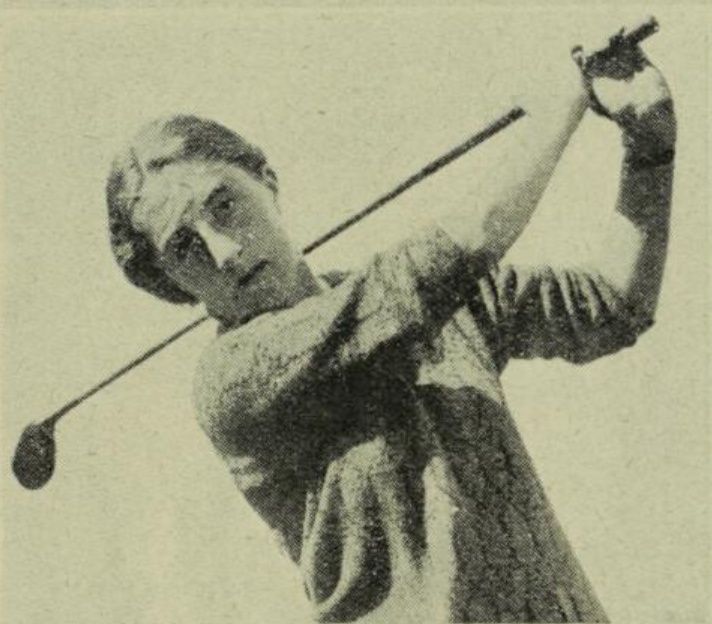
Enid Wilson in 1925

Enid Wilson (15 March 1910 – 14 January 1996) was an English amateur golfer and journalist. She won the British Ladies Amateur Golf Championship from 1931 through 1933.

== Career ==
Competing in the 1931 U.S. Women's Amateur, Wilson was eliminated in the semi-finals by ultimate champion Helen Hicks. She got some measure of satisfaction the next year when she beat Hicks, 2 and 1, in their match during the first ever Curtis Cup held at the Wentworth Golf Club, in Surrey, England. She returned to the U.S. for the 1932 Amateur but went out in the quarter-final. In the 1933 U.S. Amateur, she lost in the semi-finals to the ultimate tournament champion Virginia Van Wie but won the medal for lowest round with a record-setting score.

In 1933, Wilson partnered with Walter Hagen to play a match at the Bruntsfield Links in Edinburgh, Scotland.

However, Wilson is perhaps best known as a golf journalist and writer. She was a golf journalist for The Daily Telegraph for several decades. In 1935, she co-wrote So That's What I Do! with Robert Allen Lewis. She also wrote the section on women's golf in the 1952 book A History of Golf in Britain (1990 Reprint Ailsa Inc.). She also contributed many passages concerning British men's golf. She also wrote A Gallery of Women Golfers with the foreword by Bernard Darwin that was published in 1961 in London by Country Life Ltd.

== Personal life ==
In 1996, she died at her home in Crowborough.

== Tournament wins ==
- 1931 British Ladies Amateur Golf Championship
- 1932 British Ladies Amateur Golf Championship
- 1933 British Ladies Amateur Golf Championship

== Bibliography ==
- 1935 So That's What I Do! (with Robert Allen Lewis)
- 1961 A Gallery of Women Golfers (foreword by Bernard Darwin)
- 1964 Golf for Women

== Team appearances ==
Amateur

- Curtis Cup (representing Great Britain & Ireland): 1932
