= Women's Home Internationals =

Amateur team golf championship for women

Tournament information
- Location: England, Ireland, Scotland and Wales
- Established: 1905
- Organised by: The R&A
- Format: Team match play
- Final year: 2021

Final champion
- England

The Women's Home Internationals were an amateur team golf championship for women contested between the four Home Nations of England, Scotland, Wales and Ireland, where Ireland was represented by the whole island of Ireland on an All-Ireland basis. After the Ladies' Golf Union, the former governing body for women's golf in Great Britain and Ireland, merged into The R&A in 2016, The R&A took over organisation of the event. The match was played annually and the venue cycled between the four nations. In 2022 the match was replaced by a combined Women's and Men's Home Internationals.

The event started in 1905 when Mr. T. H. Miller presented a trophy for the competition. A number of earlier internationals had been played, with England and Ireland playing a match as early as 1895. Triangular matches involving teams from England, Ireland and Scotland had been played in 1902 and 1904.

== History ==
Up to 1958 the women's internationals were played in connection with The Women's Amateur Championship. The first international match was played between England and Ireland in 1895 at Royal Portrush in Northern Ireland, the day after the Women's Amateur Championship. There were 6 ladies in each team, England taking all the matches and winning by 34 holes to 0. The two countries played again in 1899 at Newcastle County Down. There were 9 ladies in each team, England scored in 6 of the 9 matches, winning by 37 holes to 18. A further match between the two countries was played at Aberdovey in 1901, played for the first time before the Women's Amateur Championship. The result was decided by matches rather than holes, Ireland winning 5–2. A Scottish team competed at Deal in 1902 but was not representative. On the first day, England beat Ireland and Ireland beat Scotland. The following day England beat Scotland 8–0 with two matches halved. In 1903 at Royal Portrush there were too few Scottish players to make a team and the only international was one between Ireland and England, Ireland winning 9–1. In the 1904 internationals England beat Scotland 5–4, Ireland beat England 6–3 and Scotland beat Ireland 7–2, one match being halved in each contest. The first two matches were played at Royal Troon, the third at Prestwick.

1905 saw the introduction of the Miller International Shield, donated by Thomas Horrocks Miller and presented to the winning team. Matches were reduced to teams of seven, with the contest played over two days. Extra holes were played to ensure a result. Scotland won both their matches, 4–3, on the first day to win the contest. England beat Ireland on the following day. Scotland repeated their success in 1906, again winning both of their matches, 4–3, on the first day. England again beat Ireland to finish runners-up.

In 1907, at Newcastle County Down, Wales joined the competition and all four home nations competed for the first time. Ireland won both their matches on the first day and then beat Scotland on the following day to win the Miller Shield. England were runners-up with Scotland third. Teams were increased to nine in 1908. England and Scotland won both their matches on the first day and then Scotland beat England 6–3 to win the trophy. Scotland won again in 1909, at Birkdale, and in 1910, at Westward Ho!, each time losing only 4 of their 27 individual matches, with England runners-up both times.

Wales were unable to raise a team in 1911 at Royal Portrush. Scotland and England both beat Ireland on the opening day and England managed a narrow 5–4 win over Scotland on the second day, winning one of the matches on the 19th hole. England retained the trophy at Turnberry in 1912, winning all their matches, Ireland finishing runners-up. In 1913 the event was extended to three days. England retain the shield, winning all three matches, including a close 5–4 win over Scotland on the second day. Scotland were runners-up. The 1914 event at Hunstanton returned to the previous two-day format. England beat Ireland and Scotland on the first day and retained the title with a 9–0 win over Wales. Scotland were runners-up after beating Ireland 5–4.

After World War I, a Women's Amateur Championship was planned for October 1919 at Burnham and Berrow. The championship was eventually cancelled because of a rail strike, but a decision had earlier been made not to hold any international matches. Scotland and Wales did not enter teams in 1920, at Newcastle County Down, being unable to enter a representative team. England met Ireland in the only match, winning 9–0. All four nations competed again from 1921. England dominated the tournament from 1921 to 1925, winning all 15 of their matches. The 1922 event was notable for Wales' first win, when they beat Ireland 5–4. Scotland were runners-up each year from 1921 to 1925, except in 1924 when they were beaten by Ireland.

The 1926 home internationals and the Women's Amateur Championship were postponed due to the general strike in May. The Women's Amateur Championship was rearranged in June but the internationals were not played. In 1927, England suffered their first defeat since 1910 when they were beaten 5–4 by Scotland. The match between Gertrude Percy and Dorothy Fowler went to extra holes before Percy won at the 20th hole to give Scotland the victory. England regained the shield in 1928, and retained it in 1929 and 1930 without losing a match. In 1928, Wales had their second win, again beating Ireland 5–4, as they had in 1922. The 1929 event was played on the Old Course at St. Andrew. Matches were played on Thursday and Friday rather than Friday and Saturday as had generally been the case in earlier years. Scotland were runners-up in 1928, 1929 and 1930.

Scotland regained the shield in 1931 at Portmarnock with a 6–3 win over England. England regained the title in 1932 with Ireland finishing runners-up after beating Scotland. Matches were played on Wednesday and Thursday, with 36-hole qualifying for the Women's Amateur Championship taking place on the Friday and Saturday. England retained the title in 1933 with Scotland second and Wales third, after a 5–4 win over Ireland. 1934, at Royal Porthcawl, was the first time the result was decided on individual matches won. In all previous events, one team had won all their matches. On the first day Wales beat Ireland 6–3 and then beat Scotland 5–4, their first ever win over Scotland. Scotland had earlier beaten England 5–4. On the final day England beat Wales 8–1, while Scotland beat Ireland 7–2, so that England, Scotland and Wales each had two wins. England won the title with 19 individual match wins, with Scotland second with 16 and Wales third with 12.

In 1935 at Royal County Down, Scotland regained the trophy, as they had done in 1927 and 1931, when it had previously been held in Ireland. Ireland beat England 5–4, their first win over England since 1907, to finish runners-up, with England finishing in third place for the first time. England won in 1936 with the other three nations all winning one match. Scotland were runners-up with 11 individual match wins, ahead of Ireland with 10 and Wales with 9. The 1937 matches at Turnberry were scheduled for the Friday and Saturday. However they were cancelled, after the first day, following the death of Bridget Newell in Turnberry Hotel. Newell had been due to play in the matches. Scotland won the shield in 1938 at Burnham & Berrow, beat England 6–3, their first title in England since 1910. Scotland beat England again in 1939 at Royal Portrush, this time 7–2. They retained the title, with Ireland runners-up after they beat England 5–4.

The Women's Amateur Championship was revived in 1946 and played at Hunstanton in early October. However no international matches were played, the first post-war matches being at Gullane in 1947. Scotland retained the title with a 7–2 win over England. England won the title in 1948 for the first time since 1936, beating Scotland 5–4, and retained the title in 1949, beating Scotland again by the same score. Scotland won the title in 1950, beating England 6–3 at Royal County Down. Matches were played on Thursday and Friday from 1951. Scotland retained the shield in 1951 and 1952, beating England 9–0 in 1951 and 6–3 in 1952. Ireland were runners-up in 1952 after beating England 6–3. England had a narrow 5–4 victory over Scotland in 1953 to win the title, and retained it in 1954 after beating Scotland 7½–1½. The playing of extra holes to ensure a result was dropped from 1954 and 1955 saw the first ever tied match with England and Scotland level at 4½–4½. With the two teams winning their other two matches, the result was decided. for only the second time, on individual match wins, Scotland winning with 19½ to England's 17½.

Unusually, the 1956 internationals at Sunningdale were played on the Monday and Tuesday after the Women's Amateur Championship. Scotland beat England 5–4 and retained the title, with England runners-up, despite a 4½–4½ draw with Ireland. England had 17 individual match wins to Ireland 12½. Teams were reduced from 9 to 7 in 1957. Scotland retained the title with a 4–3 win over England. In 1958 at Hunstanton, England won the title for the first time since 1954, with Ireland second after a 4–3 win over Scotland.

From 1959 the home internationals were, for the first time, played as a separate event. There were three foursomes and six singles, the event being extended to three days. In 1959 extra holes were played to get a result in each match, but from 1960 this was dropped, matches level after 18 holes being halved. England won all their matches in 1959 and 1960, with Scotland runners-up both years. The situation was reversed in 1961 and 1962 with England winning all their matches with Scotland runners-up. In 1964 Wales tied their match with Ireland 4½–4½, Wales having lost all their previous matches since beating Ireland in 1936. Wales took third place with 9 individual wins to Ireland's 8½, the first time they had not finished in last place since 1934. In 1966, Wales and Ireland again tied their match. Ireland took third place with more individual wins. 1967 saw the first tie in the event. England and Scotland drew their opening match 4½–4½ on the first day and won their remaining two matches. Both teams had 19 individual wins, England retaining the trophy as reigning champions. Ireland and Wales also drew their opening match 4½–4½, but Wales lost 8–1 against both England and Scotland and again finished in last place. The following year England and Scotland again drew their match 4½–4½, but England retained the shield with 14½ individual wins to Scotland's 13½.

In 1969 the title was again decided on individual wins. England beat Scotland 5½–3½ on the first day but lost 5–4 to Ireland on the second day, leaving England and Scotland with two wins each. Scotland had 19 individual wins to England's 18, to win the title outright for the first time since 1962. Ireland drew their match against Wales and finished in third place. England regained the title at Killarney in 1970 with three wins, including an 8½–½ defeat of Scotland. Ireland beat Scotland 5½–3½ to finish second. England were undefeated from 1970 to 1974, Scotland being runners-up in 1971, 1972 and 1973. In 1973 Wales won their first match since 1936, beating Ireland 5–4. They also tied their match against Scotland and finished in third place. In 1974, Ireland beat England 5–4 on the final day, resulting in only the second three-way tie in the history of the event. Scotland won with 18 individual points, ahead of England with Ireland third. In 1975, Wales beat Ireland 7–2, their biggest-ever win, and although they lost their other two matches, they finished runners-up for the first time, behind England. Wales were runners-up again in 1976 when they tied all three of their matches. England took the title with Scotland finishing last for the first time. England retained the title in 1977 and 1978, winning all their matches.

Ireland, who hadn't won the title since 1907, won their first two matches in 1979 but then lost to Wales on the final day. Scotland beat 7–2 on the last day and took the title on individual points. England finished in fourth place for the first time. Ireland did win the title in 1980 with three wins. England only got half-a-point, but finished ahead of Wales on individual points.

== Format ==
The championship was played over three days with the four teams competing against each other in individual matches. A match consisted of three foursomes and six singles each over 18 holes. The scores were calculated by team results with each team scoring one point for a team win and half a point for a halved match. Ties were resolved by the number of individual matches won.

== Winners ==
The event was not held during the World Wars (1915–1918, 1940–1945) and was also not played in 1919, 1926, 1946 and 2020. Of the 103 contests that have been started from 1905 to 2021, 2 were abandoned, England have won 62, Scotland 30, Ireland 6 and Wales 4. These totals include a tie between England and Scotland in 1967.

Year	Venue	Location	Winner	W	Runner-up	W	Third	W	Fourth	W	Refs.
2021	Woodhall Spa	England	England	3	Ireland	2	Scotland	1	Wales	0	
2020	Royal St David's	Wales	Cancelled due to the COVID-19 pandemic								
2019	Downfield	Scotland	England	3	Ireland	2	Scotland	1	Wales	0	
2018	Ballybunion	Ireland	Scotland	2/16½	England & Ireland tied			2/15½	Wales	0	
2017	Little Aston	England	Ireland	3	England	2	Scotland	1	Wales	0	
2016	Conwy	Wales	England	2½	Wales	1½	Ireland	1/13	Scotland	1/10½	
2015	Royal Wimbledon	England	England	2	Ireland	1½/15	Wales	1½/13½	Scotland	1	
2014	Aberdovey	Wales	England	2/16½	Ireland	2½/16	Wales	2/14½	Scotland	0	
2013	Scotscraig	Scotland	Wales	3	Ireland	1½	England	1	Scotland	½	
2012	Cork	Ireland	England	2½/18½	Wales	2½/16½	Ireland	1	Scotland	0	
2011	Hillside	England	England	3	Wales	2	Ireland	1	Scotland	0	
2010	Whitchurch	Wales	Scotland	3	Ireland	2	Wales	½/10	England	½/9½	
2009	Irvine	Scotland	Wales	2½	Scotland	2	England	1	Ireland	½	
2008	Wrexham	Wales	Wales	2/14½	England	2/14	Scotland	1/14	Ireland	1/11½	
2007	Dunbar	Scotland	England	3	Scotland	2	Ireland	1	Wales	0	
2006	Frilford Heath	England	England	3	Ireland	1½/14	Wales	1½/12½	Scotland	0	
2005	Dundalk	Ireland	England	3	Scotland	2	Wales	1	Ireland	0	
2004	Royal Porthcawl	Wales	Ireland	2	Wales	1½/13½	England	1½/12½	Scotland	1	
2003	Cruden Bay	Scotland	Ireland	2½	Scotland	2	England	1	Wales	½	
2002	The Berkshire	England	England	2/16	Scotland	2/14½	Ireland	1/12	Wales	1/11½	
2001	Carlow	Ireland	England	3	Ireland	2	Scotland & Wales tied			½/11½	
2000	Royal St David's	Wales	England	3	Wales	1½/16½	Ireland	1½/10½	Scotland	0	
1999	Royal Dornoch	Scotland	Wales	2½/17½	England	2½/16½	Ireland	1	Scotland	0	
1998	Burnham & Berrow	England	England	3	Ireland	1½	Scotland	1	Wales	½	
1997	Lahinch	Ireland	England	3	Ireland	2	Scotland	1	Wales	0	
1996	Longniddry	Scotland	England	3	Scotland	2	Ireland	1	Wales	0	
1995	Wrexham	Wales	England	2	Wales	1½/13½	Ireland	1½/9½	Scotland	1	
1994	Huddersfield	England	England	3	Scotland	1½/16	Ireland	1½/12½	Wales	0	
1993	Hermitage	Ireland	England	3	Scotland	2	Ireland	1	Wales	0	
1992	Hamilton	Scotland	England	2½/19½	Scotland	2½ /16	Ireland	1	Wales	0	
1991	Aberdovey	Wales	Scotland	3	England	2	Ireland & Wales tied			½/9½	
1990	Hunstanton	England	Scotland	3	England	1½	Ireland	1	Wales	½	
1989	Westport	Ireland	England	3	Scotland	2	Ireland	1	Wales	0	
1988	Kilmarnock (Barassie)	Scotland	Scotland	3	England	2	Ireland	½/11	Wales	½/8½	
1987	Ashburnham	Wales	England	3	Scotland	2	Ireland	1	Wales	0	
1986	Whittington Barracks	England	Ireland	2	England	1½/16	Scotland	1½/13	Wales	1	
1985	Waterville	Ireland	England	2/17	Ireland	2/15½	Scotland	2/13	Wales	0	
1984	Gullane	Scotland	England	3	Scotland	2	Ireland	1	Wales	0	
1983	Royal Porthcawl	Wales	Matches abandoned								
1982	Burnham & Berrow	England	England	2½	Scotland	2	Ireland	1½	Wales	0	
1981	Portmarnock	Ireland	Scotland	3	England	1½	Ireland	1	Wales	½	
1980	Cruden Bay	Scotland	Ireland	3	Scotland	2	England	½/12	Wales	½/9	
1979	Royal St David's	Wales	Scotland	2/15½	Ireland	2/14	Wales	1/12½	England	1/12	
1978	Moortown	England	England	3	Ireland	2	Scotland	1	Wales	0	
1977	Cork	Ireland	England	3	Ireland	2	Scotland	1	Wales	0	
1976	Troon	Scotland	England	2½	Wales	1½/13½	Ireland	1½/11	Scotland	½	
1975	Newport	Wales	England	3	Wales	1/14½	Ireland & Scotland tied			1/11	
1974	Prince's	England	Scotland	2/18	England	2/15	Ireland	2/12	Wales	0	
1973	Royal St David's	Wales	England	3	Scotland	1½/13	Wales	1½/11½	Ireland	0	
1972	Royal Lytham & St Annes	England	England	3	Scotland	1½/16	Ireland	1½/9½	Wales	0	
1971	Longniddry	Scotland	England	3	Scotland	2	Ireland	1	Wales	0	
1970	Killarney	Ireland	England	3	Ireland	2	Scotland	1	Wales	0	
1969	Western Gailes	Scotland	Scotland	2/19	England	2/18	Ireland	1½	Wales	½	
1968	Royal Porthcawl	Wales	England	2½/16½	Scotland	2½/15½	Ireland	1	Wales	0	
1967	Sunningdale	England	England & Scotland tied			2½/19	Ireland	½/9½	Wales	½/6½	
1966	Woodhall Spa	England	England	3	Scotland	2	Ireland	½/8½	Wales	½/6	
1965	Royal Portrush	Ireland	England	3	Scotland	2	Ireland	1	Wales	0	
1964	Troon	Scotland	England	3	Scotland	2	Wales	½/9	Ireland	½/8½	
1963	Formby	England	England	3	Scotland	2	Ireland	1	Wales	0	
1962	Royal Porthcawl	Wales	Scotland	3	England	2	Ireland	1	Wales	0	
1961	Portmarnock	Ireland	Scotland	3	England	2	Ireland	1	Wales	0	
1960	Gullane	Scotland	England	3	Scotland	2	Ireland	1	Wales	0	
1959	Royal Liverpool	England	England	3	Scotland	2	Ireland	1	Wales	0	
1958	Hunstanton	England	England	3	Ireland	2	Scotland	1	Wales	0	
1957	Gleneagles	Scotland	Scotland	3	England	2	Ireland	1	Wales	0	
1956	Sunningdale	England	Scotland	3	England	1½/17	Ireland	1½/12½	Wales	0	
1955	Royal Portrush	Ireland	Scotland	2½/19½	England	2½/17½	Ireland	1	Wales	0	
1954	Ganton	England	England	3	Scotland	2	Ireland	1	Wales	0	
1953	Royal Porthcawl	Wales	England	3	Scotland	2	Ireland	1	Wales	0	
1952	Troon	Scotland	Scotland	3	Ireland	2	England	1	Wales	0	
1951	Dorset	England	Scotland	3	England	2	Ireland	1	Wales	0	
1950	Royal County Down	Ireland	Scotland	3	England	2	Ireland	1	Wales	0	
1949	Royal St David's	Wales	England	3	Scotland	2	Ireland	1	Wales	0	
1948	Royal Lytham & St Annes	England	England	3	Scotland	2	Ireland	1	Wales	0	
1947	Gullane	Scotland	Scotland	3	England	2	Ireland	1	Wales	0	
1946	Hunstanton	England	Not held								
1940–1945: Suspended during World War II
1939	Royal Portrush	Ireland	Scotland	3	Ireland	2	England	1	Wales	0	
1938	Burnham & Berrow	England	Scotland	3	England	2	Ireland	1	Wales	0	
1937	Turnberry	Scotland	Matches abandoned								
1936	Southport & Ainsdale	England	England	3	Scotland	1/11	Ireland	1/10	Wales	1/9	
1935	Royal County Down	Ireland	Scotland	3	Ireland	2	England	1	Wales	0	
1934	Royal Porthcawl	Wales	England	2/19	Scotland	2/16	Wales	2/12	Ireland	0	
1933	Gleneagles	Scotland	England	3	Scotland	2	Wales	1	Ireland	0	
1932	Saunton	England	England	3	Ireland	2	Scotland	1	Wales	0	
1931	Portmarnock	Ireland	Scotland	3	England	2	Ireland	1	Wales	0	
1930	Formby	England	England	3	Scotland	2	Ireland	1	Wales	0	
1929	St Andrews	Scotland	England	3	Scotland	2	Ireland	1	Wales	0	
1928	Hunstanton	England	England	3	Scotland	2	Wales	1	Ireland	0	
1927	Royal County Down	Ireland	Scotland	3	England	2	Ireland	1	Wales	0	
1926	Royal St David's	Wales	Cancelled because of the general strike								
1925	Troon	Scotland	England	3	Scotland	2	Ireland	1	Wales	0	
1924	Royal Portrush	Ireland	England	3	Ireland	2	Scotland	1	Wales	0	
1923	Burnham & Berrow	England	England	3	Scotland	2	Ireland	1	Wales	0	
1922	Prince's	England	England	3	Scotland	2	Wales	1	Ireland	0	
1921	Turnberry	Scotland	England	3	Scotland	2	Ireland	1	Wales	0	
1920	Newcastle County Down	Ireland	England	1	Ireland	0	(Note: Scotland and Wales did not compete)				
1919	Burnham & Berrow	England	Not held								
1915–1918 Suspended during World War I
1914	Hunstanton	England	England	3	Scotland	2	Ireland	1	Wales	0	
1913	St Annes on Sea	England	England	3	Scotland	2	Ireland	1	Wales	0	
1912	Turnberry	Scotland	England	3	Ireland	2	Scotland	1	Wales	0	
1911	Royal Portrush	Ireland	England	2	Scotland	1	Ireland	0	(Note: Wales did not compete)		
1910	Westward Ho!	England	Scotland	3	England	2	Ireland	1	Wales	0	
1909	Birkdale	England	Scotland	3	England	2	Ireland	1	Wales	0	
1908	St Andrews	Scotland	Scotland	3	England	2	Ireland	1	Wales	0	
1907	Newcastle County Down	Ireland	Ireland	3	England	2	Scotland	1	Wales	0	
1906	Burnham	England	Scotland	2	England	1	Ireland	0			
1905	Cromer	England	Scotland	2	England	1	Ireland	0			

== Teams ==
=== England ===
- 2021 Rosie Belsham, Annabell Fuller, Charlotte Heath, Caley McGinty, Hannah Screen, Emily Toy, Amelia Williamson
- 2019 Lianna Bailey, Ellen Hume, Lily May Humphreys, Mimi Rhodes, Emily Toy, Isobel Wardle, Amelia Williamson
- 2018 Lianna Bailey, Georgina Blackman, India Clyburn, Samantha Fuller, Lily May Humphreys, Hollie Muse, Nicola Slater
- 2017 Emma Allen, Lianna Bailey, Gemma Clews, India Clyburn, Sophie Lamb, Rochelle Morris, Olivia Winning
- 2016 Emma Allen, Gemma Clews, Samantha Giles, Sophie Lamb, Meghan MacLaren, Elizabeth Prior, Olivia Winning
- 2015 Gemma Clews, Samantha Fuller, Samantha Giles, Sophie Keech, Sophie Lamb, Inci Mehmet, Hollie Muse, Bethan Popel
- 2014 Sarah-Jane Boyd, Gemma Clews, India Clyburn, Gabriella Cowley, Alice Hewson, Hollie Muse, Alexandra Peters, Bethan Popel
- 2013 Sarah-Jane Boyd, Gabriella Cowley, Annabel Dimmock, Rachael Goodall, Georgia Hall, Alexandra Peters, Amber Ratcliffe, Lauren Taylor
- 2012 Holly Clyburn, Gabriella Cowley, Georgia Hall, Bronte Law, Alexandra Peters, Amber Ratcliffe, Emily Taylor, Kelly Tidy
- 2011 Holly Clyburn, Charlotte Ellis, Georgia Hall, Charley Hull, Bronte Law, Lauren Taylor, Kelly Tidy, Charlotte Wild
- 2010 Hannah Barwood, Hayley Davis, Charlie Douglass, Charlotte Ellis, Nikki Foster, Charley Hull, Kelly Tidy, Tara Watters
- 2009 Hannah Barwood, Holly Clyburn, Charlie Douglass, Charlotte Ellis, Nikki Foster, Rachel Jennings, Kelly Tidy, Charlotte Wild
- 2008 Hannah Barwood, Liz Bennett, Rachel Connor, Naomi Edwards, Charlotte Ellis, Rachel Jennings, Florentyna Parker, Kerry Smith
- 2007 Claire Aitken, Rachel Bell, Liz Bennett, Naomi Edwards, Rachel Jennings, Danielle Montgomery, Melissa Reid, Kerry Smith
- 2006 Rachel Bell, Liz Bennett, Naomi Edwards, Felicity Johnson, Florentyna Parker, Melissa Reid, Kerry Smith, Sophie Walker
- 2005 Emma Duggleby, Laura Eastwood, Naomi Edwards, Jodi Ewart, Felicity Johnson, Kiran Matharu, Kerry Smith, Sophie Walker
- 2004 Lisa Ball, Emma Duggleby, Naomi Edwards, Alex Marshall, Julie Ross, Faye Sanderson, Kerry Smith, Sophie Walker
- 2003 Emma Duggleby, Sara Garbutt, Alex Keighley, Danielle Masters, Fame More, Kerry Smith, Nicola Timmins, Sophie Walker
- 2002 Emma Duggleby, Kirsty Fisher, Sara Garbutt, Sarah Heath, Rebecca Hudson, Alex Keighley, Fame More, Kerry Smith
- 2001 Kim Andrew, Fiona Brown, Emma Duggleby, Kirsty Fisher, Sarah Heath, Rebecca Hudson, Fame More, Kerry Smith
- 2000 Fiona Brown, Chloe Court, Emma Duggleby, Kirsty Fisher, Rebecca Hudson, Fame More, Rebecca Prout, Kerry Smith
- 1999 Kim Andrew, Fiona Brown, Emma Duggleby, Kirsty Fisher, Rebecca Hudson, Janet Lamb, Clare Lipscombe, Kerry Smith
- 1998 Fiona Brown, Kirsty Fisher, Rebecca Hudson, Janet Lamb, Kim Rostron, Deana Rushworth, Kerry Smith, Liza Walters
- 1997 Fiona Brown, Kate Burton, Rebecca Hudson, Elaine Ratcliffe, Kim Rostron, Kerry Smith, Karen Stupples, Lynn Tupholme
- 1996 Fiona Brown, Emma Duggleby, Emma Fields, Joanne Hockley, Rebecca Hudson, Elaine Ratcliffe, Kim Rostron, Karen Stupples
- 1995 Emma Duggleby, Emma Fields, Julie Hall, Sandy Lambert, Joanne Oliver, Elaine Ratcliffe, Karen Stupples, Lisa Walton
- 1994 Fiona Brown, Emma Duggleby, Kate Egford, Julie Hall, Sandy Lambert, Kirsty Speak, Katie Tebbet, Lisa Walton
- 1993 Sarah Burnell, Nicola Buxton, Julie Hall, Joanne Hockley, Sandy Lambert, Joanne Morley, Georgina Simpson, Kirsty Speak
- 1992 Rachel Bolas, Nicola Buxton, Janet Collingham, Kate Egford, Caroline Hall, Julie Hall, Joanne Hockley, Joanne Morley
- 1991 Nicola Buxton, Fiona Edmond, Caroline Hall, Julie Hall, Joanne Hockley, Joanne Morley, Emma Smith, Lisa Walton
- 1990 Lora Fairclough, Linzi Fletcher, Lisa Hackney, Julie Hall, Fiona Macdonald, Joanne Morley, Katie Tebbet, Angela Uzielli
- 1989 Helen Dobson, Lora Fairclough, Linzi Fletcher, Julie Hall, Alison Johns, Simone Morgan, Sara Robinson, Allison Shapcott
- 1988 Linda Bayman, Helen Dobson, Lora Fairclough, Joanne Furby, Alison Johns, Susan Shapcott, Jill Thornhill, Julie Wade
- 1987 Linda Bayman, Janet Collingham, Helen Dobson, Joanne Furby, Tracy Hammond, Alison Johns, Jill Thornhill, Julie Wade
- 1986 Janet Collingham, Julia Hill, Trish Johnson, Susan Moorcraft, Susan Shapcott, Pat Smillie, Jill Thornhill, Julie Walter
- 1985 Linda Bayman, Caroline Hall, Trish Johnson, Susan Moorcraft, Pat Smillie, Susan Shapcott, Carole Swallow, Jill Thornhill
- 1984 Linda Bayman, Julie Brown, Laura Davies, Penny Grice, Trish Johnson, Janet Melville, Jill Thornhill, Claire Waite
- 1983 Linda Bayman, Laura Davies, Kitrina Douglas, Penny Grice, Beverley New, Janet Soulsby, Jill Thornhill, Claire Waite
- 1982 Pip Barry, Kitrina Douglas, Christine Nelson, Beverley New, Janet Soulsby, Jill Thornhill, Claire Waite, Julie Walter
- 1981 Christine Barker, Diane Christison, Penny Clarke, Kitrina Douglas, Janet Melville, Beverley New, Janet Soulsby, Claire Waite
- 1980 Christine Barker, Elizabeth Boatman, Carole Caldwell, Sandy Cohen, Bridget Cooper, Linda Moore, Beverley New, Julie Walter
- 1979 Christine Barker, Carole Caldwell, Sandy Cohen, Debbie Dowling, Sue Hedges, Janet Melville, Linda Moore, Julie Walter
- 1978 Carole Caldwell, Mary Everard, Julia Greenhalgh, Dinah Henson, Vanessa Marvin, Janet Melville, Ruth Porter, Angela Uzielli
- 1977 Sally Barber, Maxine Burton, Mary Everard, Julia Greenhalgh, Dinah Henson, Beverly Huke, Vanessa Marvin, Angela Uzielli
- 1976 Julia Greenhalgh, Lynne Harrold, Dinah Henson, Beverly Huke, Stephanie Jolly, Jenny Lee-Smith, Anne Stant, Angela Uzielli
- 1975 Maxine Burton, Julia Greenhalgh, Lynne Harrold, Dinah Henson, Beverly Huke, Ann Irvin, Jenny Lee-Smith, Anne Stant
- 1974 Barbara Bargh, Lynne Harrold, Elizabeth Head, Jenny Lee-Smith, Carol Le Feuvre, Anne Stant, Jill Thornhill, Julie Walter
- 1973 Linda Denison-Pender, Mary Everard, Ann Irvin, Carol Le Feuvre, Jenny Lee-Smith, Suzanne Parker, Carole Redford, Sue Westall
- 1972 Sally Barber, Angela Bonallack, Linda Denison-Pender, Mary Everard, Beverly Huke, Ann Irvin, Carol Le Feuvre, Michelle Walker
- 1971 Judy Blaymire, Linda Denison-Pender, Diane Frearson, Julia Greenhalgh, Beverly Huke, Ann Irvin, Carol Le Feuvre, Kathryn Phillips
- 1970 Sally Barber, Barbara Dixon, Mary Everard, Julia Greenhalgh, Ann Irvin, Dinah Oxley, Kathryn Phillips, Michelle Walker
- 1969 Barbara Dixon, Mary Everard, Julia Greenhalgh, Ann Irvin, Dinah Oxley, Kathryn Phillips, Margaret Pickard, Margaret Wenyon
- 1968 Sally Barber, Sarah German, Ann Irvin, Dinah Oxley, Kathryn Phillips, Ruth Porter, Vivien Saunders, Margaret Wenyon
- 1967 Liz Chadwick, Mary Everard, Sarah German, Ann Irvin, Dinah Oxley, Margaret Pickard, Vivien Saunders, Pam Tredinnick
- 1966 Susan Armitage, Angela Bonallack, Liz Chadwick, Julia Greenhalgh, Jean Holmes, Bridget Jackson, Margaret Nuttall, Ruth Porter
- 1965 Susan Armitage, Liz Chadwick, Gillian Cheetham, Ann Irvin, Bridget Jackson, Ruth Porter, Marley Spearman, Jill Thornhill
- 1964 Susan Armitage, Angela Bonallack, Mary Everard, Bridget Jackson, Ruth Porter, Jean Roberts, Marley Spearman, Sheila Vaughan
- 1963 Susan Armitage, Angela Bonallack, Liz Chadwick, Julia Greenhalgh, Ann Irvin, Bridget Jackson, Marley Spearman, Sheila Vaughan
- 1962 Angela Bonallack, Sally Bonallack, Diane Frearson, Ann Irvin, Ruth Porter, Jean Roberts, Marley Spearman, Sheila Vaughan
- 1961 Angela Bonallack, Sally Bonallack, Julia Greenhalgh, Margaret Nichol, Ruth Porter, Diane Robb, Marley Spearman, Sheila Vaughan
- 1960 Sally Bonallack, Julia Greenhalgh, Margaret Nichol, Ruth Porter, Elizabeth Price, Marley Spearman, Tessa Ross Steen, Sheila Vaughan
- 1959 Angela Bonallack, Bridget Jackson, Margaret Nichol, Ruth Porter, Elizabeth Price, Tessa Ross Steen, Frances Smith, Marley Spearman
- 1958 Jeanne Bisgood, Angela Bonallack, Ann Howard, Bridget Jackson, Margaret Nichol, Elizabeth Price, Marley Spearman
- 1957 Veronica Anstey, Ruth Ferguson, Jean Hetherington, Ann Howard, Bridget Jackson, Elizabeth Price, Marley Spearman, Angela Ward
- 1956 Veronica Anstey, Jeanne Bisgood, Zara Bolton, Ann Howard, Bridget Jackson, Elizabeth Price, Marley Spearman, Angela Ward, Jane Yuille
- 1955 Veronica Anstey, Gillian Atkinson, Zara Bolton, Ann Howard, Bridget Jackson, Elizabeth Price, Frances Smith, Marley Spearman, Jane Sugden
- 1954 Jeanne Bisgood, Katharine Cairns, Mary Hampson, Beryl Lowe, Jane Machin, Jean McIntyre, Ann Phillips, Elizabeth Price, Frances Stephens
- 1953 Jeanne Bisgood, Katharine Cairns, Maureen Garrett, Jacqueline Gordon, Jane Machin, Wanda Morgan, Elizabeth Price, Ann Phillips, Frances Stephens
- 1952 Frances Allen, Jeanne Bisgood, Katharine Cairns, Pam Davies, Joan Gee, Jacqueline Gordon, Gabrielle Keiller, Elizabeth Price, Gillian Rudgard, Frances Stephens
- 1951 Audrey Barrett, Jeanne Bisgood, Zara Bolton, Katharine Cairns, Pam Davies, Joan Gee, Elizabeth Price, Gillian Rudgard, Frances Stephens
- 1950 Jeanne Bisgood, Zara Bolton, Katharine Cairns, Maureen Garrett, Joan Gee, Mervyn Sutherland Pilch, Muriel Roskrow, Gillian Rudgard, Frances Stephens
- 1949 Jeanne Bisgood, Zara Bolton, Jacqueline Gordon, Edith Kyle, Gabrielle Style, Frances Stephens, Jean McIntyre, Mervyn Sutherland Pilch, Mollie Wallis
- 1948 Zara Bolton, Katharine Cairns, Jacqueline Gordon, Edith Kyle, Elizabeth Price, Muriel Roskrow, Maureen Ruttle, Frances Stephens, Gabrielle Style, Mollie Wallis
- 1947 Katharine Cairns, Peggy Carrick, Diana Critchley, Jacqueline Gordon, Mervyn Sutherland Pilch, Maureen Ruttle, Enid Sheppard, Frances Stephens, Phyllis Wylie
- 1939 Pam Barton, Peggy Carrick, Elsie Corlett, Zara Bonner Davis, Kathleen Garnham, Jean Hamilton, Margaret Hodgson, Beryl Pockett, Edith Rhodes
- 1938 Pam Barton, Elsie Corlett, Madeleine Fyshe, Marjorie Ross Garon, Kathleen Garnham, Molly Gourlay, Jean Hamilton, Brenda Norris, Phyllis Wade
- 1937 Pam Barton, Elsie Corlett, Marjorie Ross Garon, Kathleen Garnham, Jean Hamilton, Wanda Morgan, Beryl Newton, Edith Rhodes, Phyllis Wade
- 1936 Pam Barton, Elsie Corlett, Gwen Cradock-Hartopp, Diana Fishwick, Kathleen Garnham, Marjorie Ross Garon, Wanda Morgan, Bridget Newell, Beryl Newton, Phyllis Wade
- 1935 Pam Barton, Ina Clarke, Mrs Clement, Elsie Corlett, Diana Fishwick, Mary Johnson, Wanda Morgan, Beryl Newton, Diana Plumpton, Phyllis Wade
- 1934 Mrs Clement, Marjorie Ross Garon, Molly Gourlay, Mary Johnson, Wanda Morgan, Beryl Newton, Dorothy Pearson, Diana Plumpton, Phyllis Wade
- 1933 Beryl Brown, Ina Clarke, Elsie Corlett, Diana Fishwick, Kathleen Garnham, Marjorie Ross Garon, Molly Gourlay, Edith Guedalla, Wanda Morgan
- 1932 Mrs Clement, Elsie Corlett, Diana Fishwick, Kathleen Garnham, Marjorie Ross Garon, Nancye Gold, Molly Gourlay, Wanda Morgan, Dorothy Pearson, Muriel Porter, Gillian Rudgard
- 1931 Elsie Corlett, Diana Fishwick, Kathleen Garnham, Nancye Gold, Audrey Holmes, Wanda Morgan, Dorothy Pearson, Muriel Porter, Rhona Rabbidge, Gillian Rudgard
- 1930 Beryl Brown, Elsie Corlett, Gladys Dobell, Diana Fishwick, Molly Gourlay, Edith Guedalla, Phyllis Lobbett, Dorothy Pearson, Enid Wilson
- 1929 Elsie Corlett, Dorothy Fowler, Nancye Gold, Molly Gourlay, Edith Guedalla, Phyllis Lobbett, Dorothy Pearson, Joyce Wethered, Enid Wilson, Mabel Wragg
- 1928 Dorothy Fowler, Judith Fowler, Marjorie Ross Garon, Molly Gourlay, Edith Guedalla, Evelyn Hall, Cecil Leitch, Dorothy Pearson, Enid Wilson
- 1927 Beryl Cautley, Elsie Corlett, Audrey Croft, Dorothy Fowler, Marjorie Ross Garon, Molly Gourlay, Edith Guedalla, Cecil Leitch, Phyllis Lobbett
- 1925 Gladys Bastin, Beryl Cautley, Doris Chambers, Gladys Dobell, Dorothy Fowler, Cecil Leitch, Muriel Macbeth, Joyce Wethered, Joy Winn
- 1924 Gladys Bastin, Beryl Cautley, Doris Chambers, Dorothy Fowler, Molly Gourlay, Cecil Leitch, Phyllis Lobbett, Muriel Macbeth, Joyce Wethered
- 1923 Gladys Bastin, Beryl Cautley, Dorothy Fowler, Molly Gourlay, Doris Hartill, Muriel Macbeth, Joan Stocker, Joyce Wethered, Joy Winn
- 1922 Gladys Bastin, Beryl Cautley, Cecil Leitch, Edith Leitch, Phyllis Lobbett, Muriel Macbeth, Phyllis Read, Joan Stocker, Joyce Wethered
- 1921 Gladys Bastin, Gladys Dobell, Molly Griffiths, Cecil Leitch, Edith Leitch, Muriel Macbeth, Winifred McNair, Joyce Wethered, Joy Winn
- 1920 Gladys Bastin, Doris Chambers, Gladys Dobell, Molly Griffiths, Eleanor Helme, Cecil Leitch, Edith Leitch, Muriel Macbeth, Joy Winn
- 1914 Lettie Barry, Beryl Cautley, Muriel Dodd, Cecil Leitch, May Leitch, Gladys Ravenscroft, Winifred Martin Smith, Amy Sumpter, Stella Temple
- 1913 Lettie Barry, Beryl Cautley, Muriel Dodd, Eleanor Helme, Gladys Heming-Johnson, Cecil Leitch, Lily Moore, Gladys Ravenscroft, Stella Temple
- 1912 Lettie Barry, Florence Bourn, Beryl Cautley, Doris Chambers, Maud Gibb, Eleanor Helme, Cecil Leitch, May Leitch, Lily Moore, Gladys Ravenscroft, Amy Sumpter
- 1911 Lettie Barry, Doris Chambers, Margaret Gavin, Eleanor Helme, Gladys Heming-Johnson, Cecil Leitch, Gladys Ravenscroft, Evelyn Steel, Bertha Thompson
- 1910 Doris Chambers, Phillis Collett, Margaret Gavin, Alice Kennion, Cecil Leitch, Edith Leitch, Evelyn Morant, Elinor Nevile, Maud Titterton
- 1909 Florence Bourn, Doris Chambers, Frances Crummack, Cicely Foster, Gladys Heming-Johnson, Elsie Hetherington, Hannah Remer, Alice Richardson, Bertha Thompson
- 1908 Hilda Evans, Elinor Nevile, Edith Leitch, Evelyn Steel, Amy Sumpter, Gladys Tamworth, Bertha Thompson, Maud Titterton, B Turner
- 1907 Doris Chambers, Alice Richardson, Evelyn Steel, Amy Sumpter, Bertha Thompson, Maud Titterton, Grace Willock-Pollen
- 1906 Doris Chambers, Cicely Foster, Evelyn Morant, Elinor Nevile, Evelyn Steel, Bertha Thompson, Maud Titterton
- 1905 Lottie Dod, Cicely Foster, Mrs Hunter, Elinor Nevile, Eveline Phillips, Evelyn Steel, Bertha Thompson

=== Scotland ===
- 2021 Hannah Darling, Louise Duncan, Chloe Goadby, Hazel MacGarvie, Tara Mactaggart, Lorna McClymont, Shannon McWilliam
- 2019 Kimberley Beveridge, Penny Brown, Hannah Darling, Louise Duncan, Chloe Goadby, Hazel MacGarvie, Shannon McWilliam
- 2018 Gemma Batty, Eilidh Briggs, Chloe Goadby, Connie Jaffrey, Hazel MacGarvie, Hannah McCook, Shannon McWilliam
- 2017 Gemma Batty, Eilidh Briggs, Chloe Goadby, Connie Jaffrey, Hannah McCook, Shannon McWilliam, Clara Young
- 2016 Eilidh Briggs, Chloe Goadby, Connie Jaffrey, Hannah McCook, Jessica Meek, Heather Munro, Clara Young
- 2015 Megan Briggs, Chloe Goadby, Gabrielle Macdonald, Hannah McCook, Kate McIntosh, Shannon McWilliam, Gillian Paton, Ailsa Summers
- 2014 Kimberley Beveridge, Megan Briggs, Jordana Graham, Gabrielle Macdonald, Louise MacGregor, Tara Mactaggart, Hannah McCook, Kate McIntosh
- 2013 Eilidh Briggs, Megan Briggs, Connie Jaffrey, Gabrielle Macdonald, Hannah McCook, Alyson McKechin, Heather Munro, Lauren Whyte
- 2012 Eilidh Briggs, Kelsey MacDonald, Alyson McKechin, Laura Murray, Jane Turner, Rachel Walker, Rachael Watton, Lauren Whyte
- 2011 Eilidh Briggs, Megan Briggs, Louise Kenney, Kelsey MacDonald, Alyson McKechin, Pamela Pretswell, Jane Turner, Rebecca Wilson
- 2010 Megan Briggs, Louise Kenney, Kelsey MacDonald, Laura Murray, Martine Pow, Pamela Pretswell, Jane Turner, Rachael Watton
- 2009 Carly Booth, Megan Briggs, Louise Kenney, Kelsey MacDonald, Laura Murray, Pamela Pretswell, Jane Turner, Kylie Walker
- 2008 Megan Briggs, Louise Kenney, Kelsey MacDonald, Laura Murray, Emily Ogilvy, Pamela Pretswell, Michele Thomson, Kylie Walker
- 2007 Carly Booth, Megan Briggs, Kelsey MacDonald, Laura Murray, Emily Ogilvy, Pamela Pretswell, Michele Thomson, Jenna Wilson
- 2006 Sara Bishop, Krystle Caithness, Louise Kenney, Heather MacRae, Roseanne Niven, Martine Pow, Sally Watson, Jenna Wilson
- 2005 Krystle Caithness, Anne Laing, Fiona Lockhart, Heather MacRae, Clare Queen, Kylie Walker, Gemma Webster, Jenna Wilson
- 2004 Krystle Caithness, Lynn Kenny, Anne Laing, Heather MacRae, Martine Pow, Clare Queen, Kylie Walker, Jenna Wilson
- 2003 Pamela Feggans, Louise Kenney, Lynn Kenny, Anne Laing, Lesley Mackay, Heather MacRae, Clare Queen, Laura Wells
- 2002 Pamela Feggans, Lynn Kenny, Anne Laing, Susie Laing, Lesley Mackay, Linzi Morton, Clare Queen, Heather Stirling
- 2001 Claire Hargan, Lynn Kenny, Anne Laing, Lesley Mackay, Laura Moffat, Linzi Morton, Heather Stirling, Sheena Wood
- 2000 Alison Davidson, Claire Hargan, Lynn Kenny, Lesley Mackay, Hilary Monaghan, Linzi Morton, Heather Stirling, Sheena Wood
- 1999 Karyn Burns, Claire Hargan, Anne Laing, Lesley Mackay, Lesley Nicholson, Jayne Smith, Heather Stirling, Sheena Wood
- 1998 Elaine Farquharson-Black, Anne Laing, Vikki Laing, Elaine Moffat, Laura Moffat, Hilary Monaghan, Lesley Nicholson, Alison Rose
- 1997 Elaine Farquharson-Black, Claire Hargan, Anne Laing, Vikki Laing, Sharon McMaster, Hilary Monaghan, Lesley Nicholson, Alison Rose
- 1996 Anne Laing, Mhairi McKay, Sharon McMaster, Valerie Melvin, Laura Moffat, Hilary Monaghan, Lesley Nicholson, Alison Rose
- 1995 Caroline Agnew, Jayne Ford, Anne Laing, Sharon McMaster, Hilary Monaghan, Lesley Nicholson, Alison Rose, Lindsey Roxburgh
- 1994 Jayne Ford, Fiona McKay, Mhairi McKay, Sharon McMaster, Valerie Melvin, Lesley Nicholson, Alison Rose, Lindsey Roxburgh
- 1993 Jayne Ford, Catriona Lambert, Susan Little, Fiona McKay, Mhairi McKay, Myra McKinlay, Alison Rose, Lindsey Roxburgh
- 1992 Fiona Anderson, Catriona Lambert, Fiona McKay, Mhairi McKay, Myra McKinlay, Janice Moodie, Alison Rose, Morag Wright
- 1991 Fiona Anderson, Elaine Farquharson, Alison Gemmill, Catriona Lambert, Mhairi McKay, Janice Moodie, Alison Rose, Morag Wright
- 1990 Fiona Anderson, Elaine Farquharson, Donna Jackson, Catriona Lambert, Myra McKinlay, Janice Moodie, Alison Rose, Morag Wright
- 1989 Fiona Anderson, Lindsey Anderson, Elaine Farquharson, Julie Forbes, Alison Gemmill, Shirley Huggan, Kathryn Imrie, Catriona Lambert
- 1988 Fiona Anderson, Lindsey Anderson, Tracey Craik, Elaine Farquharson, Julie Forbes, Alison Gemmill, Kathryn Imrie, Shirley Lawson
- 1987 Fiona Anderson, Lindsey Anderson, Elaine Farquharson, Julie Forbes, Alison Gemmill, Lesley Hope, Shirley Lawson, Donna Thomson
- 1986 Fiona Anderson, Lindsey Anderson, Julie Forbes, Alison Gemmill, Lesley Hope, Shirley Lawson, Belle Robertson, Mary Summers
- 1985 Julie Forbes, Marjory Ferguson, Alison Gemmill, Lesley Hope, Shirley Lawson, Wilma Leburn, Belle Robertson, Donna Thomson
- 1984 Fiona Anderson, Sharon Gallagher, Alison Gemmill, Lesley Hope, Kathryn Imrie, Belle Robertson, Gillian Stewart, Pamela Wright
- 1983 Wilma Aitken, Fiona Anderson, Jane Connachan, Sharon Gallagher, Sandra Roy, Gillian Stewart, Donna Thomson, Pamela Wright
- 1982 Wilma Aitken, Jane Connachan, Alison Gemmill, Belle Robertson, Gillian Stewart, Donna Thomson, Winnie Wooldridge, Pamela Wright
- 1981 Wilma Aitken, Fiona Anderson, Lorna Bennett, Jane Connachan, Alison Gemmill, Belle Robertson, Gillian Stewart, Pamela Wright
- 1980 Wilma Aitken, Fiona Anderson, Lorna Bennett, Jane Connachan, Lesley Hope, Connie Lugton, Belle Robertson, Gillian Stewart
- 1979 Wilma Aitken, Fiona Anderson, Jane Connachan, Suzanne McMahon, Dale Reid, Joan Smith, Marion Stavert, Gillian Stewart
- 1978 Wilma Aitken, Connie Lugton, Catherine Panton, Dale Reid, Maureen Richmond, Belle Robertson, Joan Smith, Muriel Thomson
- 1977 Fiona Anderson, Lorna Bennett, Suzanne Cadden, Connie Lugton, Catherine Panton, Maureen Richmond, Joan Smith, Muriel Thomson
- 1976 Suzanne Cadden, Lesley Hope, Sharon Lambie, Sandra Needham, Catherine Panton, Joan Smith, Muriel Thomson, Ina Walker
- 1975 Gladys Cadden, Suzanne Cadden, Lesley Hope, Kathleen Lackie, Sandra Needham, Joan Smith, Muriel Thomson, Maureen Walker
- 1974 Gladys Cadden, Suzanne Cadden, Kathleen Lackie, Sandra Needham, Muriel Thomson, Ina Walker, Maureen Walker, Aileen Wilson
- 1973 Connie Lugton, Sandra Needham, Catherine Panton, Belle Robertson, Ina Walker, Maureen Walker, Aileen Wilson, Janette Wright
- 1972 Connie Lugton, Sandra Needham, Catherine Panton, Joan Rennie, Belle Robertson, Joan Smith, Maureen Walker, Isobel Wylie
- 1971 Heather Anderson, Jean Bald, Annette Laing, Sandra Needham, Joan Rennie, Joan Smith, Ina Walker, Isobel Wylie
- 1970 Heather Anderson, Marjory Ferguson, Jill Hutton, Annette Laing, Joan Lawrence, Joan Norris, Belle Robertson, Joan Smith, Ina Walker, Isobel Wylie
- 1969 Heather Anderson, Jean Bald, Marjory Ferguson, Jill Hutton, Joan Lawrence, Sandra Needham, Belle Robertson, Joan Smith
- 1968 Heather Anderson, Jean Bald, Cathie Barclay, Joan Lawrence, Connie Lugton, Joan Norris, Joan Smith, Marigold Speir
- 1967 Marjory Fowler, Annette Laing, Joan Lawrence, Margaret Myles, Joan Norris, Joan Rennie, Joan Smith, Janette Wright
- 1966 Marjory Fowler, Joan Hastings, Annette Laing, Joan Lawrence, Ansley Reid, Belle Robertson, Joan Smith, Janette Wright
- 1965 Heather Anderson, Marjory Fowler, Sheila Hamilton, Joan Hastings, Joan Lawrence, Connie Lugton, Belle Robertson, Janette Wright
- 1964 Heather Anderson, Marjory Fowler, Joan Lawrence, Ethel Philip, Ansley Reid, Belle Robertson, Betty Singleton, Marigold Speir
- 1963 Marjory Fowler, Joan Lawrence, Ethel Philip, Ansley Reid, Belle Robertson, Betty Singleton, Dorothea Sommerville, Janette Wright
- 1962 Marjorie Draper, Marjory Fowler, Joan Lawrence, Ansley Lurie, Ethel Philip, Belle Robertson, Betty Singleton, Dorothea Sommerville
- 1961 Cathie Barclay, Joan Hastings, Joan Lawrence, Ansley Lurie, Belle Robertson, Betty Singleton, Dorothea Sommerville, Janette Wright
- 1960 Joan Lawrence, Ansley Lurie, Margaret Myles, Belle Robertson, Betty Singleton, Dorothea Sommerville, Janette Wright
- 1959 Marjory Fowler, Hazel Glennie, Jean Hay, Joan Lawrence, Belle McCorkindale, Margaret Myles, Janette Robertson, Dorothea Sommerville
- 1958 Belle McCorkindale, Margaret Myles, Marjorie Peel, Janette Robertson, Betty Singleton, Dorothea Sommerville, Jessie Valentine
- 1957 Helen Holm, Marjorie Peel, Janette Robertson, Betty Singleton, Dorothea Sommerville, Marigold Speir, Jessie Valentine
- 1956 Helen Burton, Millicent Couper, Vyvian Falconer, Margaret Myles, Marjorie Peel, Janette Robertson, Betty Singleton, Dorothea Sommerville, Jessie Valentine
- 1955 Helen Burton, Vyvian Falconer, Helen Holm, Nan Menzies, Marjorie Peel, Janette Robertson, Betty Singleton, Dorothea Sommerville, Jessie Valentine
- 1954 Vyvian Falconer, Jean Kerr, Margaret Myles, Marjorie Peel, Catherine Ritchie, Janette Robertson, Betty Singleton, Jessie Valentine, Irene Watt, Evelyn Young
- 1953 Cathie Barclay, Helen Burton, Jean Donald, Vyvian Falconer, Marjorie Peel, Catherine Ritchie, Janette Robertson, Betty Singleton, Jessie Valentine
- 1952 Jean Donald, Vyvian Falconer, Clem Montgomery, Mrs J Park, Moira Paterson, Marjorie Peel, Catherine Ritchie, Janette Robertson, Betty Singleton, Jessie Valentine
- 1951 Charlotte Beddows, Jean Donald, Vyvian Falconer, Helen Holm, Meg Main, Moira Paterson, Marjorie Peel, Catherine Ritchie, Jessie Valentine
- 1950 Charlotte Beddows, Jean Donald, Vyvian Falconer, Helen Holm, Meg Main, Moira Paterson, Clem Montgomery, Marjorie Peel, Jessie Valentine
- 1949 Charlotte Beddows, Jean Donald, Vyvian Falconer, Jean Kerr, Clem Montgomery, Moira Paterson, Marjorie Peel, Morag Thompson, Jessie Valentine
- 1948 Charlotte Beddows, Jean Donald, Vyvian Falconer, Helen Holm, Jean Kerr, Clem Montgomery, Catherine Park, Moira Paterson, Doris Porter, Nan Wardlaw
- 1947 Charlotte Beddows, Jean Donald, Vyvian Falconer, Helen Holm, Jean Kerr, Clem Montgomery, Catherine Park, Doris Park, Jessie Valentine, Nan Wardlaw
- 1939 Jessie Anderson, Nan Baird, Millicent Couper, Mary Duncan, Betty Henderson, Clem Montgomery, Helen Nimmo, Catherine Park, Charlotte Watson
- 1938 Jessie Anderson, Nan Baird, Elizabeth Bowhill, Ysobel Greenlees, Helen Holm, Clem Montgomery, Helen Nimmo, Doris Park, Marjorie Peel
- 1937 Jessie Anderson, Nan Baird, Millicent Couper, Vyvian Falconer, Helen Holm, Clem Montgomery, Doris Park, Minnie Robertson-Durham, Charlotte Watson
- 1936 Jessie Anderson, Nan Baird, Millicent Couper, Helen Holm, Vyvian Lamb, Clem Montgomery, Helen Nimmo, Minnie Robertson-Durham, Charlotte Watson
- 1935 Jessie Anderson, Nan Baird, Millicent Couper, Ysobel Greenlees, Helen Holm, Jean McCulloch, Clem Montgomery, Doris Park, Charlotte Watson
- 1934 Jessie Anderson, Freda Coats, Millicent Couper, Ysobel Greenlees, Helen Holm, Clem Montgomery, Doris Park, Marjorie Peel, Charlotte Watson
- 1933 Freda Kelway Bamber, Freda Coats, Ysobel Greenlees, Helen Holm, Dorothy Leete, Jean McCulloch, Clem Montgomery, Doris Park, Charlotte Watson
- 1932 Nan Baird, Freda Coats, Helen Holm, Vyvian Lamb, Jean McCulloch, Clem Montgomery, Doris Park, Charlotte Watson, Margaret Wallace-Williamson
- 1931 Helen Burton, Hilda Cameron, Freda Coats, Ysobel Greenlees, Jean McCulloch, Clem Montgomery, Doris Park, Gertrude Percy, Charlotte Watson
- 1930 Hilda Cameron, Kathleen Cochrane, Ysobel Greenlees, Dorothy Hurd, Jean McCulloch, Clem Montgomery, Doris Park, Gertrude Percy, Charlotte Watson
- 1929 Hilda Cameron, Kathleen Cochrane, Millicent Couper, Kathleen Macdonald, Jean McCulloch, Clem Montgomery, Doris Park, Marjorie Thomas, Charlotte Watson
- 1928 Hilda Cameron, Kathleen Cochrane, Joan Gow, Ysobel Greenlees, Dorothy Hurd, Betty Inglis, Kathleen Macdonald, Clem Montgomery, Gertrude Percy,
- 1927 Freda Kelway Bamber, Hilda Cameron, Joan Gow, Jean McCulloch, Beatrice Mellis, Doris Park, Gertrude Percy, Mary Wood, Charlotte Watson
- 1925 Eva Anderson, Elsie Brown, Kathleen Cochrane, Audrey Kyle, Clem Montgomery, May Nicolson, Doris Park, Clare Steel, Mary Wood
- 1924 Elsie Farie Anderson, Elsie Brown, Kathleen Cochrane, Joan Gow, Eileen Greenlees, Audrey Kyle, Jean McCulloch, Beatrice Mellis, Ethel Robertson
- 1923 Freda Kelway Bamber, Joan Gow, Audrey Kyle, Jean McCulloch, Clem Montgomery, Jessie Patey, Lena Scroggie, Elsie Grant Suttie, Charlotte Watson
- 1922 Grace Baynes, Peggy Harrison, Ina Knight, Jean McCulloch, Clem Montgomery, Doris Park, Jessie Patey, Lena Scroggie, Elsie Grant Suttie, Charlotte Watson
- 1921 Eva Anderson, Grace Baynes, Winifred Brown, J G Brown, Jean McCulloch, Ada MacKenzie, Clem Montgomery, Lena Scroggie, Charlotte Watson
- 1914 Mary Benton, Cissie Kinloch, Freda MacAndrew, Hilda Mather, Madge Neill-Fraser, Katharine Stuart, Elsie Grant Suttie, Rita Grant Suttie, Charlotte Stevenson
- 1913 Winifred Brown, Cissie Kinloch, Freda MacAndrew, Madge Maitland, Hilda Mather, Madge Neill-Fraser, May Nicolson, Flora Rigby, Charlotte Stevenson, Frances Teacher
- 1912 Eva Anderson, Alexa Glover, Dorothy Jenkins, Madge Maitland, Hilda Mather, Madge Neill-Fraser, Flora Rigby, Katharine Stuart, Frances Teacher, Florence Veitch
- 1911 Eva Anderson, Winifred Brown, Dorothy Campbell, Dorothy Jenkins, Ida Kyle, Madge Neill-Fraser, Elsie Grant Suttie, Katharine Stuart, Frances Teacher
- 1910 Eva Anderson, Winifred Brown, Dorothy Jenkins, Elsie Kyle, Ida Kyle, Madge Neill-Fraser, May Nicolson, Elsie Grant Suttie, Katharine Stuart
- 1909 Winifred Brown, Dorothy Campbell, Alexa Glover, Elsie Kyle, Hilda Mather, Madge Neill-Fraser, Grace Robertson, Katharine Stuart, Frances Teacher
- 1908 Winifred Brown, Dorothy Campbell, Alexa Glover, Madge Maitland, Madge Neill-Fraser, Grace Robertson, Jean Rusack, Elsie Grant Suttie, Frances Teacher
- 1907 Winifred Brown, J G Brown, Violet Henry-Anderson, Madge Neill-Fraser, Dorothea Robertson, Grace Robertson, Mary Thomson
- 1906 Winifred Brown, J G Brown, Dorothy Campbell, Alexa Glover, Molly Graham, Madge Maitland, Madge Neill-Fraser
- 1905 Winifred Brown, J G Brown, Dorothy Campbell, Alexa Glover, Molly Graham, Madge Maitland, Hilda Mather, Madge Neill-Fraser

=== Ireland ===
- 2021 Sara Byrne, Beth Coulter, Aine Donegan, Anna Foster, Julie McCarthy, Lauren Walsh, Annabel Wilson
- 2019 Shannon Burke, Paula Grant, Jessica Ross, Chloe Ryan, Rachel Thompson, Lauren Walsh, Annabel Wilson
- 2018 Shannon Burke, Louise Coffey, Paula Grant, Mairead Martin, Jessica Ross, Lauren Walsh, Annabel Wilson
- 2017 Ciara Casey, Maria Dunne, Paula Grant, Mairead Martin, Julie McCarthy, Chloe Ryan, Annabel Wilson
- 2016 Jessica Carty, Louise Coffey, Maria Dunne, Paula Grant, Olivia Mehaffey, Jessica Ross, Sinead Sexton
- 2015 Maria Dunne, Paula Grant, Sarah Helly, Julie McCarthy, Niamh McSherry, Olivia Mehaffey, Chloe Ryan, Annabel Wilson
- 2014 Mary Doyle, Maria Dunne, Amy Farrell, Paula Grant, Olivia Mehaffey, Jean O'Driscoll, Chloe Ryan, Sinead Sexton
- 2013 Mary Doyle, Maria Dunne, Amy Farrell, Paula Grant, Leona Maguire, Lisa Maguire, Olivia Mehaffey, Emma O'Driscoll
- 2012 Jessica Carty, Sarah Cunningham, Mary Dowling, Maria Dunne, Gillian O'Leary, Chloe Ryan, Lucy Simpson, Deirdre Smith
- 2011 Louise Coffey, Karen Delaney, Paula Grant, Lisa Maguire, Emma O'Driscoll, Gillian O'Leary, Charlene Reid, Chloe Ryan
- 2010 Louise Coffey, Mary Dowling, Leona Maguire, Lisa Maguire, Danielle McVeigh, Gillian O'Leary, Sinead O'Sullivan, Charlene Reid
- 2009 Victoria Bradshaw, Sarah Cunningham, Mary Dowling, Niamh Kitching, Danielle McVeigh, Aedin Murphy, Gillian O'Leary, Charlene Reid
- 2008 Dawn-Marie Conaty, Karen Delaney, Tara Delaney, Gemma Hegarty, Niamh Kitching, Danielle McVeigh, Aedin Murphy, Gillian O'Leary
- 2007 Victoria Bradshaw, Karen Delaney, Tara Delaney, Niamh Kitching, Danielle McVeigh, Maura Morrin, Gillian O'Leary, Marian Riordan
- 2006 Claire Coughlan, Maria Dunne, Martina Gillen, Niamh Kitching, Tricia Mangan, Danielle McVeigh, Maura Morrin, Deirdre Smith
- 2005 Claire Coughlan, Tara Delaney, Maria Dunne, Martina Gillen, Tricia Mangan, Maura Morrin, Heather Nolan, Deirdre Smith
- 2004 Claire Coughlan, Martina Gillen, Helen Jones, Tricia Mangan, Maura Morrin, Heather Nolan, Sinead O'Sullivan, Deirdre Smith
- 2003 Claire Coughlan, Tara Delaney, Maria Dunne, Helen Jones, Sinead Keane, Tricia Mangan, Maura Morrin, Heather Nolan
- 2002 Alison Coffey, Martina Gillen, Sinead Keane, Tricia Mangan, Darragh McGowan, Heather Nolan, Eileen Rose Power, Marian Riordan
- 2001 Yvonne Cassidy, Alison Coffey, Claire Coughlan, Elaine Dowdall, Martina Gillen, Hazel Kavanagh, Sinead Keane, Eileen Rose Power
- 2000 Yvonne Cassidy, Alison Coffey, Claire Coughlan, Emma Dickson, Elaine Dowdall, Sinead Keane, Tricia Mangan, Suzanne O'Brien
- 1999 Alison Coffey, Claire Coughlan, Emma Dickson, Elaine Dowdall, Martina Gillen, Suzanne O'Brien, Oonagh Purfield, Deirdre Smith
- 1998 Lillian Behan, Alison Coffey, Elaine Dowdall, Hazel Kavanagh, Tricia Mangan, Michelle McGreevy, Suzanne O'Brien, Oonagh Purfield
- 1997 Alison Coffey, Elaine Dowdall, Suzanne Fanagan, Paula Gorman, Hazel Kavanagh, Michelle McGreevy, Ada O'Sullivan, Eileen Rose Power
- 1996 Lillian Behan, Alison Coffey, Suzanne Fanagan, Barbara Hackett, Eavan Higgins, Michelle McGreevy, Ada O'Sullivan, Eileen Rose Power
- 1995 Yvonne Cassidy, Alison Coffey, Suzanne Fanagan, Eavan Higgins, Hazel Kavanagh, Denise McCarthy, Ada O'Sullivan, Eileen Rose Power
- 1994 Yvonne Cassidy, Tracey Eakin, Barbara Hackett, Eavan Higgins, Hazel Kavanagh, Ada O'Sullivan, Eileen Rose Power, Laura Webb
- 1993 Tracey Eakin, Barbara Hackett, Eavan Higgins, Hazel Kavanagh, Lynn McCool, Mary McKenna, Eileen Rose Power, Aideen Rogers
- 1992 Tracey Eakin, Eavan Higgins, Claire Hourihane, Vari McGreevy, Ada O'Sullivan, Eileen Rose Power, Aideen Rogers, Laura Webb
- 1991 Laura Bolton, Tracey Eakin, Eavan Higgins, Claire Hourihane, Denise McCarthy, Eileen Rose McDaid, Mary McKenna, Lynne Sweeney
- 1990 Lesley Callen, Tracey Eakin, Claire Hourihane, Denise McCarthy, Eileen Rose McDaid, Vari McGreevy, Mary McKenna, Deirdre Mahon
- 1989 Laura Bolton, Ann Ferguson, Claire Hourihane, Dympna Keenan, Eileen Rose McDaid, Mary McKenna, Deirdre Mahon, Carol Wickham
- 1988 Laura Bolton, Debbie Hanna, Eavan Higgins, Claire Hourihane, Denise McCarthy, Eileen Rose McDaid, Mary McKenna, Therese O'Reilly
- 1987 Debbie Hanna, Eavan Higgins, Claire Hourihane, Eileen Rose McDaid, Vari McGreevy, Mary McKenna, Rita Walsh, Philomena Wickham
- 1986 Lillian Behan, Eavan Higgins, Claire Hourihane, Kate MacCann, Mary McKenna, Yvonne McQuillan, Sheena O'Brien-Kenney, Therese O'Reilly
- 1985 Lillian Behan, Maureen Garner, Eavan Higgins, Claire Hourihane, Kate MacCann, Mary McKenna, Yvonne McQuillan, Sheena O'Brien-Kenney
- 1984 Lillian Behan, Eavan Higgins, Claire Hourihane, Kate MacCann, Maureen Madill, Mary McKenna, Sheena O'Brien-Kenney, Ada O'Sullivan
- 1983 Eavan Higgins, Claire Hourihane, Maureen Madill, Mary McKenna, Sheena O'Brien-Kenney, Ada O'Sullivan, Carol Wickham, Philomena Wickham
- 1982 Laura Bolton, Bridget Gleeson, Susan Gorman, Eavan Higgins, Claire Hourihane, Maureen Madill, Mary McKenna, Ada O'Sullivan
- 1981 Laura Bolton, Rhona Brennan, Susan Gorman, Eavan Higgins, Claire Hourihane, Maureen Madill, Mary McKenna, Claire Robinson
- 1980 Bridget Gleeson, Susan Gorman, Mary Gorry, Claire Hourihane, Maureen Madill, Mary McKenna, Claire Nesbitt, Lilian Starrett
- 1979 Ita Butler, Susan Gorman, Mary Gorry, Rhona Hegarty, Claire Hourihane, Maureen Madill, Mary McKenna, Claire Nesbitt
- 1978 Ita Butler, Mary Gorry, Rhona Hegarty, Maureen Madill, Mary McKenna, Therese Moran, Claire Nesbitt, Sheena O'Brien-Kenney
- 1977 Ita Butler, Mary Gorry, Rhona Hegarty, Ann Heskin, Mary McKenna, Therese Moran, Claire Nesbitt, Sheena O'Brien-Kenney
- 1976 Ita Butler, Susan Gorman, Mary Gorry, Rhona Hegarty, Mary McKenna, Lilian Malone, Claire Nesbitt, Philomena Wickham
- 1975 Elaine Bradshaw, Mary Gorry, Rhona Hegarty, Ann Heskin, Mary McKenna, Lilian Malone, Claire Nesbitt, Vivienne Singleton
- 1974 Elaine Bradshaw, Mary Gorry, Rhona Hegarty, Mary Irvine, Mary McKenna, Claire Nesbitt, Maire O'Donnell, Vivienne Singleton
- 1973 Ita Butler, Gerry Costello, Mary Gorry, Josephine Mark, Mary McKenna, Maisie Mooney, Elizabeth Purcell, Vivienne Singleton
- 1972 Ita Butler, Mary Gorry, Ann Heskin, Josephine Mark, Carol McAuley, Mary McKenna, Maisie Mooney, Elizabeth Purcell
- 1971 Pearl Boyd, Elaine Bradshaw, Ita Butler, Mary Gorry, Josephine Mark, Carol McAuley, Mary McKenna, Vivienne Singleton
- 1970 Elaine Bradshaw, Ita Butler, Moira Earner, Zelie Gaynor, Ann Heskin, Carol McAuley, Mary McKenna, Vivienne Singleton
- 1969 Elaine Bradshaw, Philomena Garvey, Zelie Gaynor, Ann Heskin, Catherine Hickey, Margaret Madeley, Carol McAuley, Mary McKenna
- 1968 Joan Beckett, Elaine Bradshaw, Gwen Brandom, Ita Butler, Philomena Garvey, Zelie Gaynor, Carol McAuley, Mary McKenna
- 1967 Joan Beckett, Elaine Bradshaw, Gwen Brandom, Pat Eakin, Oonagh Heskin, Zelie Gaynor, Carol McAuley, Pat O'Sullivan, Elizabeth Purcell
- 1966 Joan Beckett, Elaine Bradshaw, Gwen Brandom, Ita Burke, Barbara Hyland, Carol McAuley, Pat O'Sullivan, Elizabeth Purcell
- 1965 Elizabeth Barnett, Gwen Brandom, Ita Burke, Zelie Fallon, Barbara Hyland, Sandra Owen, Pat O'Sullivan, Elizabeth Purcell
- 1964 Elizabeth Barnett, Elaine Bradshaw, Ita Burke, Margaret Coburn, Zelie Fallon, Barbara Hyland, Kitty MacCann, Pat O'Sullivan
- 1963 Elizabeth Barnett, Ita Burke, Heather Colhoun, Moira Earner, Zelie Fallon, Philomena Garvey, Pat O'Sullivan, Ann Sweeney
- 1962 Elizabeth Barnett, Joan Beckett, Ita Burke, Moira Earner, Zelie Fallon, Philomena Garvey, Kitty MacCann, Ann Sweeney
- 1961 Elizabeth Barnett, Dorothy Beck, Heather Colhoun, Moira Earner, Zelie Fallon, Philomena Garvey, Kitty MacCann, Ann Sweeney
- 1960 Bridget Brown, Heather Colhoun, Moira Earner, Zelie Fallon, Philomena Garvey, Kitty MacCann, Pat O'Sullivan, Ann Sweeney
- 1959 Dorothy Beck, Heather Colhoun, Zelie Fallon, Philomena Garvey, Eileen O'Grady, Pat O'Sullivan, Moira Smyth, Ann Sweeney
- 1958 Dorothy Beck, Zelie Fallon, Philomena Garvey, Irene Hurst, Kitty MacCann, Pat O'Sullivan, Moira Smyth
- 1957 Rose Bayly, Zelie Fallon, Philomena Garvey, Dorothy Humphreys, Kitty MacCann, Pat O'Sullivan, Moira Smyth
- 1956 Rose Bayly, Dorothy Beck, Ena Brooks, Zelie Fallon, Philomena Garvey, Girlie Hegarty, Kitty MacCann, Pat O'Sullivan, Moira Smyth
- 1955 Dorothy Beck, Zelie Fallon, Pat Fletcher, Girlie Hegarty, Dorothy Humphreys, Mrs Kirkwood, Pat O'Sullivan, Clarrie Reddan, Moira Smyth
- 1954 Dorothy Beck, Ena Brooks, Zelie Fallon, Pat Fletcher, Philomena Garvey, Dorothy Glendinning, Kitty MacCann, Pat O'Sullivan, Moira Smyth
- 1953 Dorothy Beck, Ena Brooks, Zelie Fallon, Dorothy Forster, Philomena Garvey, Kitty MacCann, Audrey O'Donohoe, Pat O'Sullivan, Moira Smyth
- 1952 Dorothy Beck, Zelie Fallon, Dorothy Forster, Philomena Garvey, Kitty MacCann, Aileen McCarthy, Rachael Murray, Pat O'Sullivan, Moira Smyth
- 1951 Dorothy Beck, Dorothy Forster, Philomena Garvey, Rosemary Hezlet, Kitty MacCann, Aileen McCarthy, Audrey O'Donohoe, Pat O'Sullivan, Moira Smyth
- 1950 Dorothy Beck, Philomena Garvey, Bridget Jackson, Kitty MacCann, Chrystabell MacGeagh, Jean Marks, Audrey O'Donohoe, Pat O'Sullivan, Moira Smyth
- 1949 Dorothy Beck, Philomena Garvey, Chrystabell MacGeagh, Doris Menton, Sybil Moore, Audrey O'Donohoe, Clarrie Reddan, Kitty Smye, Moira Smyth
- 1948 Dorothy Beck, Betty Brice, Philomena Garvey, Chrystabell MacGeagh, Sybil Moore, Audrey O'Donohoe, Clarrie Reddan, Kitty Smye, Moira Smyth, Pat Walker
- 1947 Dorothy Beck, Fanny Blake, Philomena Garvey, Rosemary Hezlet, Mrs Lowry, Sybil Moore, Clarrie Reddan, Kitty Smye, Moira Smyth
- 1939 Pat Fletcher, Ena Gildea, Bridget Jackson, Chrystabell MacGeagh, Jean Marks, Sybil Moore, Eithne Pentony, Clarrie Tiernan, Pat Walker
- 1938 Betty Ellis, Daisy Ferguson, Pat Fletcher, Ena Gildea, Bridget Jackson, Chrystabell MacGeagh, Sybil Moore, Clarrie Tiernan, Pat Walker
- 1937 Dorothy Beck, Betty Ellis, Daisy Ferguson, Ena Gildea, Dorothy Glendinning, Bridget Jackson, Ida Kidd, Sybil Moore, Pat Walker
- 1936 Dorothy Beck, Fanny Blake, Daisy Ferguson, Ena Gildea, Eithne Pentony, Pat Sherlock, Clarrie Tiernan, Nancy Todd, Pat Walker
- 1935 Fanny Blake, Betty Ellis, Daisy Ferguson, Jean Marks, Eithne Pentony, Pat Sherlock, Clarrie Tiernan, Nancy Todd, Pat Walker
- 1934 Fanny Blake, Daisy Ferguson, Janet Jackson, Ida Kidd, Eithne Pentony, Dorothy Pim, Pat Sherlock, Nancy Todd, Pat Walker
- 1933 Marion Alexander, Frances De Burgh Morris, May Fitzgibbon, Betty Latchford, Georgina Madill, Jean Marks, Eithne Pentony, Dorothy Pim, Pat Walker
- 1932 Fanny Blake, Betty Ellis, Daisy Ferguson, May Fitzgibbon, Eithne Pentony, Dorothy Pim, Pat Sherlock, Nancy Todd, Pat Walker
- 1931 Fanny Blake, Daisy Ferguson, May Fitzgibbon, Betty Latchford, Jean Marks, Dorothy Pim, Nancy Todd, Pat Walker, Mrs Wilson
- 1930 Marion Alexander, Daisy Ferguson, Mrs Hall, Janet Jackson, Jean Marks, Joan Mitchell, Dorothy Pim, Iris Taylor, Pat Walker
- 1929 Nina Coote, Daisy Ferguson, May Fitzgibbon, Peggy Gardiner, Janet Jackson, Mrs King, Georgina Madill, Jean Rice, Pat Walker
- 1928 Sybil Clarke, Nina Coote, Agnes Dwyer, Daisy Ferguson, Janet Jackson, Patsy Jameson, Georgina Madill, D Millar, Pat Walker
- 1927 Daisy Ferguson, Alice Gardiner, Mrs Hall, Janet Jackson, Patsy Jameson, Sheelagh Jameson, Mrs King, Georgina Madill, Jean Rice
- 1925 Nina Coote, Rhona Cuthell, Freda Jackson, Janet Jackson, Sheelagh Jameson, Mrs King, Georgina Madill, Ethel Lewis Smith, Miss Thornhill
- 1924 Florence Cramsie, Rhona Cuthell, Genevieve Hewitt, Janet Jackson, Sheelagh Jameson, Georgina Madill, Jean Rice, Miss Thornhill, Sheila Thornton
- 1923 Mabel Brownlow, Cordelia Dering, Stella Gotto, D Harrington, Genevieve Hewitt, Janet Jackson, Mrs King, Josephine Mallam, Ethel Lewis Smith
- 1922 Marion Alexander, May Brinton, Freda Jackson, Janet Jackson, Josephine Mallam, Sara O'Hare, Mrs Roche, Ethel Lewis Smith, Wanda Stuart-French
- 1921 Marion Alexander, Moya Arbuthnot, Nonna Barlow, May Fitzgibbon, Violet Hulton, Bella Jackson, Janet Jackson, Sara O'Hare, Ethel Lewis Smith
- 1920 Marion Alexander, Florence Cramsie, May Fitzgibbon, Stella Gotto, Violet Hulton, Freda Jackson, Janet Jackson, Sheelagh Jameson, Georgina Madill
- 1914 Cordelia Boyd, Ruth Durlacher, Mabel Harrison, Freda Jackson, Janet Jackson, Ethel Lewis Smith, Sheelagh Tobin, Violet Tynte, Florence Walker-Leigh
- 1913 Cordelia Boyd, Florence Cramsie, Nellie Graham, Mabel Harrison, Janet Jackson, Jessie Magill, Ethel Lewis Smith, Sheelagh Tobin, Violet Tynte, Florence Walker-Leigh
- 1912 Cordelia Boyd, Nellie Graham, Mabel Harrison, Violet Hezlet, Freda Jackson, Janet Jackson, May Ross, Violet Tynte, Florence Walker-Leigh
- 1911 Mabel Harrison, Violet Hezlet, G Lauder, R Lauder, Jessie Magill, Amy Ormsby, May Ross, Violet Tynte, Florence Walker-Leigh
- 1910 Dorothea Cuming, Ruth Durlacher, Nellie Graham, Mabel Harrison, Emily Hezlet, Florence Hezlet, Violet Hezlet, Freda Jackson, Amy Ormsby
- 1909 Ruth Durlacher, M Dickson, Nellie Graham, Mabel Harrison, Florence Hezlet, Violet Hezlet, Amy Ormsby, Violet Tynte, Florence Walker-Leigh
- 1908 Rhona Cuthell, Ruth Durlacher, Nellie Graham, Florence Hezlet, May Hezlet, M Pim, Maud Stuart, Violet Tynte, Florence Walker-Leigh
- 1907 Ruth Durlacher, Florence Hezlet, May Hezlet, Violet Hezlet, Jessie Magill, Maud Stuart, Florence Walker-Leigh
- 1906 M Armstrong, Ruth Durlacher, Florence Hezlet, May Hezlet, C L McNeile, Kathleen Lady Slade, Violet Tynte
- 1905 Ruth Durlacher, K E Gubbins, Florence Hezlet, May Hezlet, Violet Hezlet, Maud Stuart, Violet Tynte

=== Wales ===
- 2021 Fauve Birch, Lea-Anne Bramwell, Lucy Ellen Jones, Bethan Morris, Ellen Nicholas, Kath O'Connor, Jordan Ryan
- 2019 Lea-Anne Bramwell, Caitlin Evans-Brand, Becky Harries, Lauren Hillier, Lucy Jones, Kath O'Connor, Jordan Ryan
- 2018 Caitlin Evans-Brand, Lauren Hillier, Lucy Jones, Megan Lockett, Bethan Morris, Kath O'Connor, Jordan Ryan
- 2017 Alice Barnes, Olivia Kelly, Georgia Lewis, Megan Lockett, Bethan Morris, Kath O'Connor, Jordan Ryan
- 2016 Becky Harries, Lauren Hillier, Georgia Lewis, Megan Lockett, Bethan Morris, Kath O'Connor, Chloe Williams
- 2015 Samantha Birks, Nia Greville, Ella Griffiths, Lauren Hillier, Georgia Lewis, Bethan Morris, Kath O'Connor, Chloe Williams
- 2014 Samantha Birks, Jess Evans, Becky Harries, Lauren Hillier, Rachel Lewis, Megan Lockett, Jordan Ryan, Chloe Williams
- 2013 Samantha Birks, Amy Boulden, Katie Bradbury, Jess Evans, Becky Harries, Megan Lockett, Kath O'Connor, Chloe Williams
- 2012 Samantha Birks, Amy Boulden, Gemma Bradbury, Katie Bradbury, Jess Evans, Becky Harries, Kath O'Connor, Chloe Williams
- 2011 Samantha Birks, Amy Boulden, Gemma Bradbury, Katie Bradbury, Lucy Gould, Becky Harries, Kath O'Connor, Chloe Williams
- 2010 Samantha Birks, Amy Boulden, Gemma Bradbury, Katie Bradbury, Tara Davies, Lucy Gould, Becky Harries, Kath O'Connor
- 2009 Samantha Birks, Amy Boulden, Gemma Bradbury, Katie Bradbury, Tara Davies, Lucy Gould, Kath O'Connor, Rhian Wyn Thomas
- 2008 Amy Boulden, Tara Davies, Stephanie Evans, Lucy Gould, Sahra Hassan, Hannah Jenkins, Breanne Loucks, Rhian Wyn Thomas
- 2007 Tara Davies, Stephanie Evans, Lucy Gould, Lydia Hall, Becky Harries, Sahra Hassan, Breanne Loucks, Rhian Wyn Thomas
- 2006 Tara Davies, Stephanie Evans, Becky Harries, Sahra Hassan, Breanne Loucks, Jo Nicolson, Kath O'Connor, Rhian Wyn Thomas
- 2005 Kimberley Boulden, Tara Davies, Stephanie Evans, Lucy Gould, Lydia Hall, Sahra Hassan, Sarah Jones, Breanne Loucks
- 2004 Natalee Evans, Stephanie Evans, Lydia Hall, Anna Highgate, Sarah Jones, Breanne Loucks, Jo Nicolson, Kate Phillips
- 2003 Becky Brewerton, Natalee Evans, Stephanie Evans, Anna Highgate, Sarah Jones, Jo Nicolson, Kate Phillips, Jo Pritchard
- 2002 Becky Brewerton, Louise Davis, Kathryn Evans, Stephanie Evans, Anna Highgate, Sarah Jones, Kate Phillips, Jo Pritchard
- 2001 Becky Brewerton, Louise Davis, Kathryn Evans, Anna Highgate, Sarah Jones, Sara Mountford, Kate Phillips, Eleanor Pilgrim
- 2000 Becky Brewerton, Louise Davis, Kathryn Evans, Anna Highgate, Sarah Jones, Sara Mountford, Kate Phillips, Eleanor Pilgrim
- 1999 Laura Archer, Becky Brewerton, Kathryn Evans, Natalee Evans, Anna Highgate, Becky Morgan, Kate Phillips, Jo Pritchard
- 1998 Becky Brewerton, Caroline Cole, Louise Davis, Natalee Evans, Bethan Jones, Helen Lawson, Becky Morgan, Vicki Thomas
- 1997 Becky Brewerton, Louise Davis, Natalee Evans, Helen Lawson, Becky Morgan, Eleanor Pilgrim, Kate Stark, Vicki Thomas
- 1996 Pam Chugg, Lisa Dermott, Natalee Evans, Bethan Jones, Becky Morgan, Denise Richards, Kate Stark, Vicki Thomas
- 1995 Louise Davis, Lisa Dermott, Bethan Jones, Sue Lovatt, Eleanor Pilgrim, Denise Richards, Kate Stark, Vicki Thomas
- 1994 Lisa Dermott, Andrea Donne, Bethan Jones, Sue Lovatt, Ann-Marie Magee, Denise Richards, Vicki Thomas, Sue Turner
- 1993 Suzy Boyes, Lisa Dermott, Andrea Donne, Bethan Jones, Helen Lawson, Ann-Marie Magee, Julie Thomas, Vicki Thomas
- 1992 Suzy Boyes, Lisa Dermott, Julie Foster, Helen Lawson, Ann-Marie Magee, Sara Mountford, Andrea Perriam, Vicki Thomas
- 1991 Lisa Dermott, Lisa Isherwood, Helen Lawson, Ann-Marie Magee, Sara Mountford, Andrea Perriam, Vicki Thomas, Sue Turner
- 1990 Joanne Baker, Lisa Isherwood, Helen Lawson, Sara Mountford, Andrea Perriam, Sharon Roberts, Vicki Thomas, Helen Wadsworth
- 1989 Lisa Dermott, Lisa Isherwood, Helen Lawson, Sara Mountford, Sharon Roberts, Nicola Stroud, Vicki Thomas, Helen Wadsworth
- 1988 Pam Chugg, Lisa Dermott, Lisa Isherwood, Joanna Lloyd, Andrea Perriam, Sharon Roberts, Vicki Thomas, Helen Wadsworth
- 1987 Pam Chugg, Lisa Dermott, Julie Foster, Mandy Rawlings, Sharon Roberts, Vicki Thomas, Sue Turner, Helen Wadsworth
- 1986 Pam Chugg, Julie Foster, Lisa Isherwood, Mandy Rawlings, Sharon Roberts, Vicki Thomas, Sue Turner, Nicola Wesley
- 1985 Julie Foster, Ann Johnson, Mandy Rawlings, Julie Richards, Sharon Roberts, Sue Thomas, Vicki Thomas, Sue Turner
- 1984 Audrey Briggs, Julie Foster, Sue Jump, Mandy Rawlings, Sharon Roberts, Sue Thomas, Tegwen Thomas, Vicki Thomas
- 1983 Kerri Bradley, Audrey Briggs, Karen Davies, Mandy Rawlings, Julie Richards, Sharon Roberts, Tegwen Thomas, Vicki Thomas
- 1982 Kerri Bradley, Audrey Briggs, Karen Davies, Sue Jump, Julie Richards, Susan Rowlands, Tegwen Thomas, Vicki Thomas
- 1981 Audrey Briggs, Karen Davies, Wendy Griffith, Mandy Rawlings, Gillian Rees, Anne Sheldon, Tegwen Thomas, Vicki Thomas
- 1980 Audrey Briggs, Lisa Isherwood, Mandy Rawlings, Julie Richards, Christine Thomas, Tegwen Thomas, Vicki Thomas, Pamela Whitley
- 1979 Kerri Bradley, Audrey Briggs, Ann Johnson, Tegwen Perkins, Mandy Rawlings, Vicki Rawlings, Julia Rhys, Pamela Whitley
- 1978 Audrey Briggs, Lisa Isherwood, Ann Johnson, Pamela Light, Tegwen Perkins, Kerri Rawlings, Vicki Rawlings, Pamela Whitley
- 1977 Audrey Briggs, Lisa Isherwood, Pamela Light, Tegwen Perkins, Vicki Rawlings, Susan Rowlands, Christine Thomas, Pamela Whitley
- 1976 Audrey Briggs, Lisa Isherwood, Ann Johnson, Pamela Light, Tegwen Perkins, Kerri Rawlings, Vicki Rawlings, Christine Thomas
- 1975 Audrey Briggs, Elizabeth Davies, Ann Johnson, Pamela Light, Tegwen Perkins, Kerri Rawlings, Vicki Rawlings, Pamela Whitley
- 1974 Audrey Briggs, Elizabeth Davies, Joan John, Ann Johnson, Pamela Light, Tegwen Perkins, Vicki Rawlings, Pamela Whitley
- 1973 Audrey Briggs, Penny Davies, Ann Johnson, Pamela Light, Tegwen Perkins, Christine Phipps, Vicki Rawlings, Pamela Whitley
- 1972 Audrey Briggs, Lisa Isherwood, Ann Johnson, Tegwen Perkins, Christine Phipps, Vicki Rawlings, Jane Rogers, Sylvia Webster
- 1971 Audrey Briggs, Penny Davies, Ann Hughes, Jean Hughes, Anne Humphreys, Christine Phipps, Vicki Rawlings, Nancy Wright
- 1970 Audrey Briggs, Elsie Brown, Penny Davies, Ann Hughes, Anne Humphreys, Jill Morris, Christine Phipps, Pat Roberts
- 1969 Audrey Brown, Elsie Brown, Sylvia Hales, Ann Hughes, Anne Humphreys, Jill Morris, Christine Phipps, Pat Roberts
- 1968 Elsie Brown, Penny Davies, Sylvia Hales, Ann Hughes, Jill Morris, Christine Phipps, Pat Roberts, Nancy Wright
- 1967 Penny Davies, Ann Hughes, Jean Hughes, Jill Morris, Christine Phipps, Sian Richards, Pat Roberts, Nancy Wright
- 1966 Elsie Brown, Penny Davies, Ann Hughes, Jill Morris, Christine Phipps, Pat Roberts, Nancy Wright
- 1965 Elsie Brown, Judy Brown, Penny Griffiths, Elsie Ingham, Mary Oliver, Christine Phipps, Pat Roberts
- 1964 Elsie Brown, Judy Brown, Ann Hughes, Elsie Ingham, Mary Oliver, Christine Phipps, Pat Roberts, Nancy Wright
- 1963 Marjorie Barron, Elsie Brown, Jill Morris, Mary Oliver, Christine Phipps, Pat Roberts, Nellie Seddon, Nancy Wright
- 1962 Marjorie Barron, Elsie Brown, Judy Brown, Ethel Hartley, Jill Morris, Mary Oliver, Pat Roberts, Nancy Wright
- 1961 Marjorie Barron, Elsie Brown, Judy Brown, Patience Martin, Mary Oliver, Pat Roberts, Nellie Seddon, Annis Treharne
- 1960 Marjorie Barron, Denise Bloodworth, Judy Brown, Ethel Hartley, Patience Martin, Mary Oliver, Pat Roberts, Nancy Wright
- 1959 Elsie Brown, Adrienne Gwyther, Ethel Hartley, Barbara Jenkin, Patience Martin, Christine Phipps, Pat Roberts, Nancy Wright
- 1958 Marjorie Barron, Elsie Brown, Sheila Bryan-Smith, Ethel Hartley, Elsie Ingham, Pat Roberts, Nancy Wright
- 1957 Marjorie Barron, Elsie Brown, Sheila Bryan-Smith, Elsie Ingham, Denise Lewis, Pat Roberts, Nancy Wright
- 1956 Marjorie Barron, Annis Boon-Mills, Isabella Bromley-Davenport, Elsie Lever, Sheila Bryan-Smith, Joyce Jenkins, Denise Lewis, Patience Martin, Pat Roberts, Nancy Wright
- 1955 Marjorie Barron, Isabella Bromley-Davenport, Joan Johnson, Mrs R Johnson, Elsie Lever, Denise Lewis, Mary Oliver, Pat Roberts, Heather Wakelin
- 1954 Lady Ashcombe, Marjorie Barron, Isabella Bromley-Davenport, Nancy Cook, Mrs Cox, Philomena Garfield Evans, Joyce Jenkins, Elsie Lever, Denise Lewis, Grace Roberts
- 1953 Lady Ashcombe, Marjorie Barron, Elsie Brown, Isabella Bromley-Davenport, Nancy Cook, Philomena Garfield Evans, Joyce Jenkins, Elsie Lever, Grace Roberts, Pat Roberts
- 1952 Lady Ashcombe, Marjorie Barron, Elsie Brown, Sheila Bryan-Smith, Nancy Cook, Philomena Garfield Evans, Dorothy Wilson Jones, Elsie Lever, Annis Mills, Grace Roberts
- 1951 Lady Ashcombe, Marjorie Barron, Isabella Bromley-Davenport, Sheila Bryan-Smith, Nancy Cook, Philomena Garfield Evans, Mrs Stuart Jones, Elsie Lever, Pat Roberts
- 1950 Lady Ashcombe, Marjorie Barron, Elsie Brown, Sheila Bryan-Smith, Mrs Edwards, Philomena Garfield Evans, Elsie Lever, Pat Roberts, Patience Whitworth-Jones
- 1949 Marjorie Barron, Elsie Brown, Sheila Bryan-Smith, Nancy Cook, Mrs Edwards, Philomena Garfield Evans, Elsie Lever, Grace Roberts, Alice Stockton
- 1948 Marjorie Barron, Elsie Brown, Sheila Bryan-Smith, Nancy Cook, Philomena Garfield Evans, Elsie Lever, Idina Mills, Isabella Seely, Patience Whitworth-Jones
- 1947 Sheila Bryan-Smith, Nancy Cook, Mary Emery, Elsie Jones, Elsie Lever, Molly Mackean, Idina Mills, Enid Owen, Isabella Seely
- 1939 Marjorie Barron, Eileen Bridge, Anne Burrell, Shelagh Gibbs, Molly Mackean, Joane Mathias-Thomas, Idina Mills, Hilda Reynolds, Margaret Thompson
- 1938 Marjorie Barron, Mary Brearley, Eileen Bridge, Nancy Cook, Mary Emery, Molly Mackean, Barbara Pyman, Hilda Reynolds, Margaret Thompson
- 1937 Marjorie Barron, Mary Brearley, Mrs Edwards, Mary Emery, Mrs Langford, Evelyn Marley, Idina Mills, Barbara Pyman, Margaret Thompson
- 1936 Marjorie Barron, Mrs Edwards, Mary Emery, Mrs Lewis, Peggy Lloyd, Idina Mills, Barbara Pyman, Isabella Rieben, Marjorie Williams
- 1935 Marjorie Barron, Sybil Gethin Griffith, Mary Jestyn Jeffreys, Mrs Jones, Mrs Lewis, Mrs Mills, Peggy Lloyd, Barbara Pyman, Hilda Reynolds, Isabella Rieben
- 1934 Marjorie Barron, Margery Duncan, Mrs Edwards, Alda Gear Evans, Shelagh Gibbs, Mary Jestyn Jeffreys, Barbara Pyman, Dora Smalley, Isabella Rieben
- 1933 Eileen Bridge, Mrs Edwards, Alda Gear Evans, Shelagh Gibbs, Mary Jestyn Jeffreys, Barbara Pyman, Dora Smalley, Alison Rieben, Isabella Rieben
- 1932 Mrs Edwards, Alda Gear Evans, Mary Jestyn Jeffreys, Mrs Jones, Mary Justice, Barbara Pyman, Alison Rieben, Isabella Rieben, Dora Smalley
- 1931 Marjorie Barron, Evelyn Cunninghame, Sybil Gethin Griffith, Mary Jestyn Jeffreys, Mary Justice, Lilian Newman, Mrs Rees, Alison Rieben, Dora Smalley
- 1930 Marjorie Barron, Gwladys Scott Chard, Sylvia Dampney, Sybil Gethin Griffith, Evelyn Irvine, Mary Jestyn Jeffreys, Molly Marley, Barbara Pyman, Alison Rieben
- 1929 Marjorie Barron, Marjorie Caryl, Evelyn Cunninghame, Sylvia Dampney, Sybil Gethin Griffith, Kathleen Hort, Mary Jestyn Jeffreys, Barbara Pyman, Alison Rieben
- 1928 Gwladys Scott Chard, Sylvia Dampney, Margery Duncan, Sybil Gethin Griffith, Mrs Hurst, Mary Jestyn Jeffreys, Barbara Pyman, Alison Rieben, Gertrude Selkirk
- 1927 Mrs Brown, Sylvia Dampney, Cicely Freeguard, Mrs Hurst, Adeline Mactier, Lilian Newman, Mrs Rees, Alison Rieben, Mrs Weston
- 1925 Mrs Brown, Margaret Cox, Evelyn Cunninghame, Sylvia Dampney, Kathleen Allington-Hughes, Mrs Hurst, Barbara Pyman, Gertrude Selkirk, Dora Smalley
- 1924 Mrs Brown, Margaret Cox, Sylvia Dampney, Sybil Gethin Griffith, Mrs Hill, Mrs Isaac, Mrs Musgrave, Blanche Orr, Dora Smalley
- 1923 Margery Duncan, Vivien Laming Evans, Sybil Gethin Griffith, Mrs Hurst, Miss Llewellyn, Molly Marley, Mrs Mason, Mrs Musgrave, Dorothy Sowter
- 1922 Miss Cross, Evelyn Cunninghame, Margery Duncan, Vivien Laming Evans, Sybil Gethin Griffith, Eileen Hedley Hill, Kathleen Allington-Hughes, Mrs Hurst, Miss Llewellyn, Molly Marley
- 1921 Mrs Bayliss, Kathleen Allington-Hughes, Mrs Hurst, Beatrice Leaver, Miss Llewellyn, Molly Marley, Mabel Phelips, Isabel Phillips, Dorothy Oswald Thomas
- 1914 Mrs Deacon, Sybil Gethin Griffith, Kathleen Allington-Hughes, Beatrice Leaver, Miss Llewellyn, Miss Morgan, Mabel Phelips, Beatrice Storry, Nest Lloyd-Williams
- 1913 Miss D Brooke, Mrs V H Lloyd-Davies, Miss Evans, Mary Ellis-Griffith, Sybil Gethin Griffith, Miss Llewellyn, Miss Morgan, Mabel Phelips, Phyllis Shaw
- 1912 Edith Clay, Mrs Deacon, Blanche Duncan, Mary Ellis-Griffith, Kathleen Allington-Hughes, Beatrice Leaver, Miss Llewellyn, Miss Morgan, May Powell, Nest Lloyd-Williams
- 1910 Miss Aubertin, Mrs Brown, Blanche Duncan, Miss N Evans, Kathleen Allington-Hughes, Vivien Lloyd-Roberts, May Powell, Beatrice Storry, Miss I Thomas
- 1909 Miss Aubertin, Lady Cowley, Blanche Duncan, Miss Evans, Mary Ellis-Griffith, Miss Hodge, Kathleen Allington-Hughes, Mrs Powell, Miss Franklin Thomas, Nest Lloyd-Williams
- 1908 Mrs Aubertin, Mrs David, Blanche Duncan, Miss N Evans, Mary Ellis-Griffith, Kathleen Allington-Hughes, Miss M Powell, Vivien Lloyd-Roberts, Miss Whieldon
- 1907 Lady Cowley, Blanche Duncan, Mary Ellis-Griffith, Kathleen Allington-Hughes, Mrs Proctor, Miss CM Roberts, Vivien Lloyd-Roberts

== See also ==
- Men's Home Internationals
