= Katharine Cairns =

English amateur golfer

Personal information
- Full name: Katharine Olive Cairns
- Nationality: England
- Born: 14 March 1912
- Died: 18 March 1955 (aged 43) London, England

Career
- Sport: Golf
- Status: Amateur

Lady Katharine Olive Cairns (14 March 1912 – 18 March 1955) was an English sportswoman, notably an amateur golfer. She was runner-up in the 1949 English Women's Amateur Championship and was captain of the British Curtis Cup team in 1952, the first British team to win the cup. She was later the chairman of the Ladies Golf Union.

== Early life ==
Lady Katherine was the youngest child of Wilfred Cairns, 4th Earl Cairns and his wife Olive. She was educated at St Hilda's College, Oxford, where she and her friend Edith Shawcross received widespread press coverage when they offered to take the blame for a student prank in 1935, and were threatened with being sent down.

== Golf career ==
In 1937 Cairns reached the last-16 of the Women's Amateur Championship, losing 7&6 to Elsie Corlett. She reached the quarter-finals of the 1946 Women's Amateur Championship at Hunstanton, losing 5&4 to the eventual winner, Jean Hetherington. In early June 1947 she played for England in the Women's Home Internationals, for the first time. Scotland beat England 7-2 to retain the title they had held since 1939. Later in June she was part of the winning British team for the Vagliano Trophy in Paris. She did not play in the foursomes matches and lost her singles match. In 1948 she reached the quarter-finals of the English Women's Amateur Championship, beating defending champion, Mollie Wallis, and Curtis Cup player, Jacqueline Gordon, before losing to Zara Bolton. Cairns reached the final of the 1949 English Women's Amateur Championship which was played at her home club, Burnham & Berrow Golf Club. She lost 3&2 to Diana Critchley in the final. In 1950 she again reached the last-16 of the Women's Amateur Championship. In 1951 she reached quarter-finals, before losing to Frances Stephens. The following week she was selected for the British team against Belgium and then France, the British team winning both matches.

In late 1951 Cairns was chosen to be the captain of the British team for the 1952 Curtis Cup at Muirfield. Initially she was a possible player, but she later withdrew due to ill-health. The British team took a 2–1 lead after the foursomes matches on the first day. The singles match were tied 3–3, to give Britain their first Curtis Cup win.

In early 1953 she became chairman of the Ladies Golf Union. In October that year she captained the British team against Belgium and France. In total she represented England seven times in Women's Home Internationals, being on the winning team three times, in 1948, 1953 and 1954.

== Other sports ==
In addition to playing golf, Cairns played a number of other sports, including tennis, squash and hockey.

== Team appearances ==
- Curtis Cup (representing Great Britain & Ireland): 1952 (winners, non-playing captain)
- Vagliano Trophy (representing Great Britain & Ireland): 1947 (winners), 1951 (winners), 1953 (winners, captain)
- Belgium–Great Britain match (representing Great Britain & Ireland): 1951 (winners), 1953 (winners, captain)
- Women's Home Internationals (representing England): 1947, 1948 (winners), 1950, 1951, 1952, 1953 (winners), 1954 (winners)
