= Maureen Ruttle Garrett =

English golfer

Maureen Doris Ruttle Garrett (22 August 1922 – 30 July 2011) was an English amateur golfer. During her playing career, Garrett played at multiple editions of the British Ladies Amateur. Her best performances were semifinal finishes at the 1946 and 1948 editions. In United States tournaments, Garrett was tied for 11th at the 1947 Titleholders Championship. Outside of her playing career, Garrett was the president of the Ladies' Golf Union between 1982 and 1984. Garrett was the recipient of the 1983 Bob Jones Award from the United States Golf Association.

== Biography ==
Garrett was born on 22 August 1922 and grew up in London, England. As a teenager, Garrett played golf and was coached by Archie Compston. While completing her education, Garrett appeared in over ten golf competitions during wartime. Throughout World War II, Garrett was a secretary at a doctor's office before becoming a farmhand for the Women's Land Army. For her golfing career, Garrett appeared in multiple editions of the British Ladies Amateur during the 1930s to 1940s. Her best finishes were reaching the semifinals in 1946 and 1948. At the Curtis Cup, Garrett played on the Great Britain and Ireland team in 1948 and captained the British team that competed in 1960. In other team events, she played on the Great Britain and Ireland team that won the Vagliano Trophy from 1947 to 1948. Garett also captained the British team that won the Vagliano Trophy in 1959.

Outside of the United Kingdom, Garrett entered in her first United States golf events in 1947. Of her American competitions, Garrett finished in a tie for 11th place at the 1947 Titleholders Championship. She briefly returned to the United States in 1971 to play in a couple of Florida golf tournaments. Apart from her playing career, Garrett became President of the Ladies' Golf Union in 1982 and held the position until 1984. With the LGU, she was later named vice president in 1986. In 1983, Garrett received the Bob Jones Award from the United States Golf Association. Garrett died on 30 July 2011 in Poole, England. She was married and had one child.

== Team appearances ==
- Curtis Cup (representing Great Britain & Ireland): 1948, 1960 (non playing captain)
- Vagliano Trophy (representing Great Britain & Ireland): 1947 (winners), 1948 (winners)
- England–Scotland girls match (representing England): 1937, 1938
- Women's Home Internationals (representing England): 1947, 1948 (winners), 1950, 1953 (winners)
