= Kitty MacCann =

Irish amateur golfer

Personal information
- Full name: Catherine MacCann
- Nationality: Ireland
- Born: 20 February 1922 Clonmel, County Tipperary, Ireland
- Died: 29 April 2010 (aged 88) Birr, County Offaly, Ireland

Career
- Sport: Golf
- Status: Amateur

Catherine MacCann (née Smye, 20 February 1922 – 29 April 2010) was an Irish amateur golfer. She won the British Ladies Amateur in 1951, the Irish Women's Amateur Close Championship in 1949 and 1961 and was a member of the 1952 Curtis Cup team.

== Golf career ==
Irish women's golf after World War II was dominated by Philomena Garvey. Garvey won the Irish Women's Amateur Close Championship 14 times between 1946 and 1963. Garvey missed two events, in 1956 and 1961, and was only beaten twice in that period in 1949 and 1952, both times in the second round. MacCann played in the event in 1946, losing at the quarter-final stage. In 1947 she reached the final but lost to Garvey. She lost in the quarter-finals in 1948 but in 1949 took advantage of Garvey's early exit to win the title, beating Dorothy Beck in the final. MacCann won for a second time in 1961 but lost further finals to Garvey in 1957 and 1960 and to Dorothy Forster in 1952.

MacCann first played in the Women's Home Internationals in 1947, after reaching the final of the Irish championship. She played again in 1948 and 1949. These events were played on the Friday and Saturday before the start of the British Ladies Amateur at the same venue on the following Monday. However it seems that MacCann did not play in the British Ladies Amateur until 1950. She did play in the event in 1950, losing in the third round to Jessie Valentine. In 1951 at Broadstone she beat Moira Paterson in the quarter-finals and then Jeanne Bisgood in the semis, both matches going to extra holes. In the final she beat Frances Stephens 4&3 in the 36-hole final, to become the first Irish winner since 1907.

MacCann was selected for the 1952 Curtis Cup team at Muirfield. MacCann was not selected for the foursomes, the British team taking a 2–1 lead on the first day, MacCann was also not selected for the singles. However Elizabeth Price was not well in the morning and might have been replaced. However MacCann was also ill and so Price played her singles match. Price beat Grace DeMoss 3&2 and, with the singles matches tied 3–3, the British Isles won their first Curtis Cup.

== Personal life ==
MacCann was born Catherine Smye in Clonmel, County Tipperary, Ireland on 20 February 1922. Her father and brothers were amateur golfers. She married Pat MacCann on 16 February 1950. She died on 29 April 2010 at the age of 88.

== Team appearances ==
- Curtis Cup (representing Great Britain & Ireland): 1952
- Women's Home Internationals (representing Ireland): 1947, 1948, 1949, 1950, 1951, 1952, 1953, 1954, 1956, 1957, 1958, 1960, 1961, 1962, 1964
