= Sally Barber =

English amateur golfer (born 1938)

Personal information
- Nationality: England
- Born: 9 April 1938 (age 88)

Career
- Sport: Golf
- Status: Amateur

Sally Barber (née Bonallack, born 9 April 1938) is an English amateur golfer. She won the English Women's Amateur Championship in 1968 and was twice a runner-up. She won the German women's championship in 1958 and played in the 1962 Curtis Cup. She is the sister of Michael Bonallack.

== Golf career ==
Barber represented England in the 1956 England–Scotland girls match at Seaton Carew. In 1958, she won the German women's championship, beating Marietta Gütermann 8&6 in the final. She made her debut for England in the Women's Home Internationals in 1960. In 1961, she reached the semi-finals of the English Women's Amateur Championship at Littlestone but was beaten 3&2 by Peggy Reece. Barber made her debut for Great Britain & Ireland in the 1961 Vagliano Trophy. She lost her foursomes match on the opening day but won her singles match on the final day. Playing in the final match, she came from behind to beat Martine Gajan and give the team a narrow victory by 8 matches to 7.

Barber was selected for the 1962 Curtis Cup in Colorado. The British lost heavily, winning just one of the nine 36-hole matches. Barber was not selected for the foursomes and lost her singles match on the final day, 6&5 to Clifford Ann Creed. She played in the Vagliano Trophy at Muirfield in September 1963. She won both her foursomes matches but was not selected for either set of singles.

Barber did not play competitive golf from 1964 to 1967. She returned in 1968 and immediately won the English Women's Amateur Championship at Hunstanton, beating Dinah Oxley 5&4 in the 36-hole final. The following month, she reached the quarter-finals of the Ladies' British Open Amateur Championship at Walton Heath, losing to Claudine Cros-Rubin. In 1969, she reached the quarter-finals of the English championship before losing to Mary Everard. She also played in the Vagliano Trophy match in France. In early 1970, she was runner-up with Mary Everard in the Avia Foursomes. She also reached the final of the English championship at Rye, where she met Dinah Oxley, whom she had beaten in the 1968 final. This time Oxley won, 3&2, in the 18-hole final. The pair met again in the 1971 championship at Royal Liverpool, their third meeting in the final in four years. Oxley retained her title, winning 5&4 in the final. In 1972 Barber and Everard were again runners-up in the Avia Foursomes, just a stroke behind the winners. They came close to winning the event in 1973, finishing a stroke behind the leading two pairs after missing a short putt at the final hole.

Barber played less in major events from the mid-1970s, although she continued to play in the Avia Foursomes. With Angela Bonallack, she won the event in 1976 and with Angela Uzielli she was runner-up in 1979. In 1977 and 1978 she was captain of the England team in the Women's Home Internationals. In 1977, at Cork, she was one of the eight players, although she did not select herself for any matches. In 1978, she was a non-playing captain.

In 1979, Barber turned professional to play in the Women's Professional Golfers' Association events, later regarded as the inaugural season of the Ladies European Tour. She was reinstated as an amateur in 1982. She was later the captain and also the selector of a number of British and English teams.

== Personal life ==
She is the sister of Michael Bonallack and the sister-in-law of Angela Bonallack. She married David Barber in late 1962.

== Team appearances ==
- Curtis Cup (representing Great Britain & Ireland): 1962
- Vagliano Trophy (representing Great Britain & Ireland): 1961 (winners), 1963 (winners), 1969
- European Ladies' Team Championship (representing England): 1969, 1971 (winners)
- Women's Home Internationals (representing England): 1960 (winners), 1961, 1962, 1968 (winners), 1970 (winners), 1972 (winners), 1977 (playing captain, winners)
- England–Scotland girls match (representing England): 1956 (winners)
