= Ann Howard (golfer) =

English amateur golfer

Personal information
- Full name: Ann Bickerton Howard
- Nationality: England
- Born: 22 October 1934 (age 92) Radcliffe, Lancashire, England

Career
- Sport: Golf
- Status: Amateur

Ann Bickerton Howard (née Phillips, born 22 October 1934) is an English amateur golfer. She won the 1952 Girls Amateur Championship and was in two Curtis Cup teams, in 1956 and 1968.

== Golf career ==
Howard reached the final of the Girls Amateur Championship in 1950, losing 5&4 to Janette Robertson, and the semi-finals in 1951, losing to Jane Redgate by one hole. She won the title in 1952 beating Suzanne Marbrook 7&6 in the 18-hole final. She played in the event for the final time in 1953 but lost in the quarter-finals to Angela Ward. Howard played in the England–Scotland girls match each year from 1951 to 1953. At the age of 16, Howard was a runner-up in the 1951 Daily Graphic Women's National Tournament, a 36-hole stroke-play event, three strokes behind Jeanne Bisgood.

In 1953 Howard made her senior debut in the Women's Home Internationals. She was also part of the British juniors team that played in the Commonwealth tournament at Formby in early July. The other teams were Britain, Canada and New Zealand. The New Zealanders and Canadians also played matches against England, Howard playing in both matches. In 1955 she was selected for the squads for the Vagliano Trophy match against France and the match against Belgium.

At the end of March 1956, Wright was selected for the Curtis Cup team at Prince's. Britain won the match 5–4, their second win in the event, but Howard was not selected to play in any matches. In 1957 she again played in the matches against France and Belgium.

Howard was a surprise choice for the 1968 Curtis Cup team at Royal County Down, the team having been selected after a series of trials. The British team led after the first day but eventually lost by 3 points. Howard played in one of the foursomes matches and one of the singles, losing them both.

Howard was a runner-up in the 1989 Ladies' Senior British Open Amateur Championship. She represented England in Senior Internationals between 1989 and 1992.

== Personal life ==
Howard was the daughter of Arthur Phillips, the professional at Whitefield Golf Club. In late 1954, she married Nigel Howard, an English cricketer.

== Team appearances ==
- Curtis Cup (representing Great Britain & Ireland): 1956 (winners), 1968
- Vagliano Trophy (representing Great Britain & Ireland): 1955 (winners), 1957 (winners)
- Belgium–Great Britain match (representing Great Britain & Ireland): 1955 (winners), 1957 (winners)
- Commonwealth tournament (representing British juniors): 1953
- Women's Home Internationals (representing England): 1953 (winners), 1954 (winners), 1955, 1956, 1957, 1958 (winners)
- England–New Zealand match (representing England): 1953 (winners)
- England–Canada match (representing England): 1953 (winners)
- England–Scotland girls match (representing England): 1951 (winners), 1952 (winners), 1953 (winners)
