= Charlotte Beddows =

Scottish golfer and hockey player

- Born: Charlotte Stevenson; 22 October 1887; Edinburgh, Scotland
- Died: 22 August 1976 (aged 88); North Berwick, Scotland
- Known for: Golfer and hockey player
- Spouses: John Watson; Edward Beddows, Brigadier, RAMC
- Parent(s): Catherine Maule and James Stevenson, general merchant

Charlotte Beddows (22 October 1887 – 22 August 1976) was a Scottish golfer and hockey player.

== Early life ==
Beddows was born in Edinburgh. Her father, James Stevenson, was a scratch golfer in East Lothian. As a teenager, she played hockey for Scotland from 1905.

== Career ==
Beddows was the captain of the Scottish hockey team on several occasions. She was also president of the Scottish Women's Hockey Association between 1925 and 1931.

She was also an accomplished golfer, with particular skills as a long hitter. She said that in 1905, aged 17, she made it to the semi-final of the Scottish Women's Championships. Aged 19, she became champion of Craigmillar Park Golf Club, and runner-up in the Gibson Cup at Braid Hills Golf Club.

Beddows played in the Women's Home Internationals 21 times between 1913 and 1951. She won the Scottish Women's Amateur Championship in 1920, 1921, 1922 and 1929, and was runner-up in 1923, and in 1950, aged 62. She won East of Scotland Championship 1931 and 1932.

She played in the first Curtis Cup in 1932, as Mrs. J. B. Watson, the name of her first husband.

She was a member of a number of golf clubs, including Elie, Grim's Dyke, Gullane, Longniddry, Murrayfield and St Rule.

She was a founding member of the Midlothian Ladies County Golf Association.

== Personal life ==
Her first husband was John Watson, an Edinburgh optician. Her second husband was Edward Beddows, Brigadier, RAMC, who was a doctor. In 1955, she contracted a form of polio, from which she recovered and resumed her golf career.

== Death ==
Beddows died in North Berwick in 1976.
