= Janet Melville =

English amateur golfer (born 1958)

Personal information
- Full name: Janet Kay Melville
- Nationality: England
- Born: 16 March 1958 (age 68) Lancashire, England

Career
- Sport: Golf
- Status: Amateur
- Professional wins: 1

Janet Kay Melville (later Collingham, also Davies; born 16 March 1958) is an English golfer. She won two important championships, the 1978 Women's British Open and the 1987 Ladies' British Open Amateur Championship.

== Golf career ==
Melville played for England in the 1976 Girls Home Internationals. In 1978 she won the Women's British Open at Foxhills, two strokes ahead of Wilma Aitken. Vivien Saunders was the leading professional, tying for third place. She was a shot behind Aitken at the start of the final day but had two steady rounds of the final day and was only player to break 80 in all four rounds. Just four professionals competed. Later in 1978 she made her senior debut for England in the Women's Home Internationals, while in 1979 she played for Great Britain & Ireland in the Vagliano Trophy at Royal Porthcawl.

In early 1987, playing with Pat Smillie, Melville was runner-up in the Avia Foursomes, a stroke behind Tracy Hammond and Susan Moorcraft. Later in the year she won the Ladies' British Open Amateur Championship at Royal St David's beating Susan Shapcott at the 19th hole of the final. In 1987 she also played for Great Britain & Ireland in the Vagliano Trophy and for Great Britain in the Commonwealth Trophy in New Zealand.

In 2008 she won the English senior stroke-play championship at Beau Desert, a stroke ahead of Carolyn Kirk. The same year she also tied for third place in the Ladies' Senior British Open Amateur Championship, a stroke behind the winner. Competing again as Janet Melville, she won the English senior stroke-play championship for a second time in 2012, at Shifnal, three strokes ahead of Sue Dye. In 2013 she won the English senior women's amateur championship at her home club, Sherwood Forest, beating Chris Quinn 2&1 in the final.

== Personal life ==
She married Gregg Collingham in 1984, and Anthony Edward Davies in 2018. She was a probate solicitor by profession. She has two children.

== Team appearances ==
- Vagliano Trophy (representing Great Britain & Ireland): 1979 (tied), 1987 (winners)
- Commonwealth Trophy (representing Great Britain): 1987
- European Ladies' Team Championship (representing England): 1979, 1989
- Women's Home Internationals (representing England): 1978 (winners), 1979, 1981, 1984 (winners), 1986, 1987 (winners), 1992 (winners)
- Girls Home Internationals (representing England): 1976
