= Kelly Tidy =

English golfer

Kelly Tidy (born February 1992) is a former professional golfer from England, who now works in golf event management.

== Career ==
=== Amateur ===
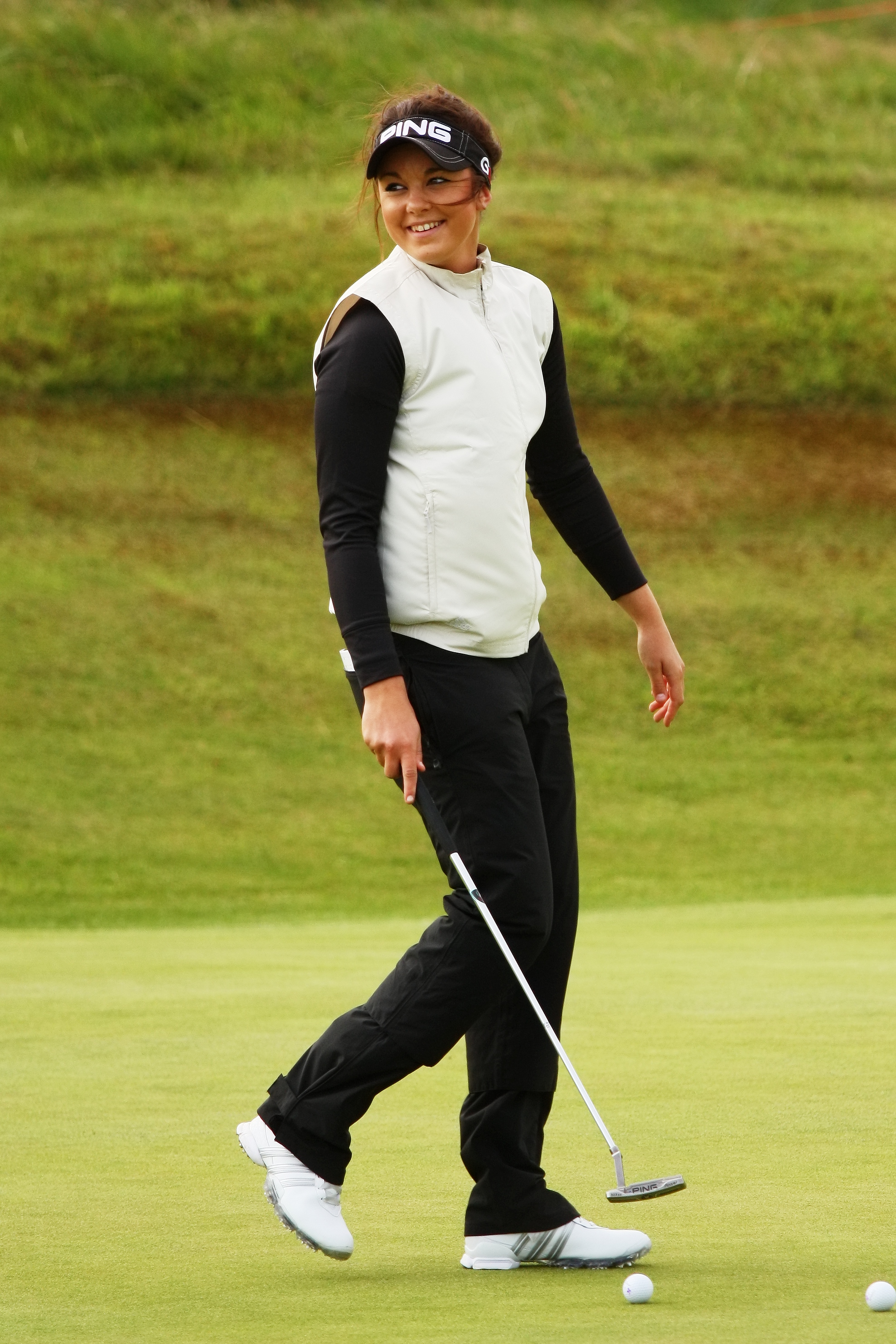
Kelly Tidy at the 2010 Ladies British Open Amateur

Tidy started her amateur career in 2009, where she competed in the British Ladies Amateur. Tidy finished in the final 16 that year.

In 2010, Tidy competed in five major amateur competitions: Helen Holm Scottish Women's Open Championship, Welsh Amateur Ladies Open Stroke Play Championship, British Ladies Amateur, Espirito Santo Trophy, Ladies' British Open Amateur Stroke Play Championship. In the Scottish Women's Open Amateur, Tidy ended the competition in place T17. She followed that with a place T18 finish in the Welsh Amateur Ladies Open Stroke Play Championship. Tidy then won the British Ladies Amateur, where she defeated Kelsey MacDonald in the final. After her first taste of victory, Tidy finished the year with a T40 place at the Espirito Santo Trophy, as well as a T12 place in the Ladies' British Stroke Play.

The following year, in 2011, Tidy competed in the Scottish Women's Open Amateur for the second consecutive year, this time with a T20 place finish. Tidy also reached the semi-finals in her title defence of the British Ladies Amateur. She played in the English Women's Open Amateur Stroke Play Championship and finished in third place.

Her final year as an amateur was 2012, where she competed in four major tournaments. Tidy finished in place T5 in the Welsh Ladies Stroke Play and reached the last 16 in the British Ladies Amateur. In the English Women's Open Amateur, Tidy finished in place T12, before finishing third in the Ladies British Stroke Play.

In 2012, Tidy also competed in the 2012 Curtis Cup, where she was on the victorious team.

=== Professional ===
Tidy become a professional golfer in 2013, at the age of 21. She managed two tournaments before suffering a serious injury. Tidy was diagnosed with a condition which restricts the blood flow to her arms, called forearm ischaemia, which kept her out of competitive golf for a year. Tidy returned for a few weeks, however took the decision to retire after not enjoying the lifestyle.

== Amateur wins ==
this list may be incomplete

- 2010 British Ladies Amateur
- 2012 English Women's Amateur Championship

== Team appearances ==
- Junior Ryder Cup (representing Europe): 2008, 2010
- Junior Solheim Cup (representing Europe): 2009
- Women's Home Internationals (representing England): 2009, 2010, 2011 (winners), 2012 (winners)
- Espirito Santo Trophy (representing England): 2010
- Vagliano Trophy (representing Great Britain and Ireland): 2011
- European Ladies' Team Championship (representing England): 2011
- Curtis Cup (representing Great Britain and Ireland): 2012 (winners)
- Astor Trophy (representing Great Britain and Ireland): 2011 (winners)
