= Dorothea Sommerville =

Scottish amateur golfer

Personal information
- Full name: Dorothea Train Sommerville
- Nationality: Scotland
- Born: 21 June 1934 Glasgow, Scotland
- Died: 18 November 2015 (aged 81) Scotland

Career
- Sport: Golf
- Status: Amateur

Dorothea Train Sommerville (married name Hastings, 21 June 1934 – 18 November 2015) was a Scottish amateur golfer. She won the 1958 Scottish Women's Amateur Championship and was a member of the 1958 Curtis Cup team.

== Golf career ==
Sommerville didn't start to play golf until 1950. However, she made rapid progress and played in the England–Scotland girls match in 1952. In the Girls Amateur Championship that year she beat Janette Robertson at the last-16 stage but lost to Suzanne Marbrook in the quarter-finals. In 1953, she was part of the British juniors team that played in the Commonwealth tournament at Formby in early July. The other teams were Britain, Canada and New Zealand. In 1955, she made her debut for Scotland in the Women's Home Internationals at Royal Portrush, Scotland winning the title narrowly. Sommerville was selected as part of a British women's team that toured Australia and New Zealand in the second half of 1955. Because many of the senior players were unavailable, the team turned into a team of five juniors, aged between 18 and 21. The tour was such a success that the team was awarded the Association of Golf Writers trophy, the first time a team had won the award.

Sommerville won the 1958 Scottish Women's Amateur Championship at Elie, beating Janette Robertson by one hole in the 36-hole final. Soon after this win, Sommerville was selected for the 1958 Curtis Cup at Brae Burn Country Club. The match in August was tied, with Britain retaining the cup as the previous holders. Sommerville was not chosen for the first-day foursomes and with the match being very close, she was left out of the last-day singles as well. Sommerville reached the final of the Scottish Women's Amateur Championship again at Turnberry in 1960 and again played Janette Robertson. Robertson won this time, 2&1. In 1963 she lost at the 20th hole, in the semi-final of the championship, to Joan Lawrence, the defending champion.

Sommerville played in the Women's Home Internationals each year from 1955 to 1963, and in 1963 made her only appearance in the Vagliano Trophy at Muirfield. She won both her foursomes matches and both her singles matches.

== Personal life ==
In late 1963, Sommerville married Dr. James Hastings. They had two children. She then did not play golf for about 20 years, busy raising her children while assisting her husband with running his medical practice. Returning to the game, she had considerable success and was the Scottish Veterans champion in 1992 and 1994.

== Team appearances ==
- Curtis Cup (representing Great Britain & Ireland): 1958 (tied)
- Vagliano Trophy (representing Great Britain & Ireland): 1963 (winners)
- Commonwealth tournament (representing British juniors): 1953
- Women's Home Internationals (representing Scotland): 1955 (winners), 1956 (winners), 1957 (winners), 1958, 1959, 1960, 1961 (winners), 1962 (winners), 1963
- England–Scotland girls match (representing Scotland): 1952
