= 1948 Curtis Cup =

5th annual golf competition in Berkshire, England

Coordinates: 53.622°N 3.033°W

5th Curtis Cup Match
- Dates: 21–22 May 1948
- Venue: Royal Birkdale Golf Club
- Location: Southport, England
- Captains: Doris Chambers (British Isles); Glenna Collett Vare (USA)
(United Kingdom) (Republic of Ireland)	2 1/2	6 1/2	(United States)
- United States wins the Curtis Cup

The 5th Curtis Cup Match was played on 21 and 22 May 1948 at Royal Birkdale Golf Club in Southport, England. The United States won 6 1/2 to 2 1/2.

The United States won two of the three foursomes matches and won four and halved another of the six singles.

== Format ==
The contest was played over two days, with three foursomes on the first day and six singles matches on the second day, a total of 9 points. Matches were over 18 holes.

Each of the 9 matches was worth one point in the larger team competition. If a match was all square after the 18th hole extra holes were not played. Rather, each side earned 1/2 a point toward their team total. The team that accumulated at least 5 points won the competition.

== Teams ==
& British Isles
Name	Notes
(England) Doris Chambers	non-playing captain
(England) Zara Bolton
(Scotland) Jean Donald
(England) Diana Critchley	played in 1932 and 1934
(Republic of Ireland) Philomena Garvey
(England) Jacqueline Gordon
(Scotland) Helen Holm	played in 1936 and 1938
(Republic of Ireland) Clarrie Reddan	played in 1938
(England) Maureen Ruttle

Diana Critchley did not play in any matches.

United States
Name	Notes
Glenna Collett Vare	playing captain, played in 1932, 1936 and 1938
Dorothy Kielty
Dorothy Kirby
Grace Lenczyk
Estelle Page	played in 1938
Polly Riley
Louise Suggs

== Friday's foursomes matches ==
&	Results
Donald/Gordon	(United Kingdom) (Republic of Ireland) 3 & 2	Suggs/Lenczyk
Garvey/Bolton	(United States) 4 & 3	Kirby/Vare
Ruttle/Reddan	(United States) 5 & 4	Page/Kielty
1	Session	2
1	Overall	2

== Saturday's singles matches ==
Diana Critchley was due to play in the final singles match, but withdrew due to illness and was replaced by Zara Bolton.

&	Results
Philomena Garvey	halved	Louise Suggs
Jean Donald	(United Kingdom) (Republic of Ireland) 2 up	Dorothy Kirby
Jacqueline Gordon	(United States) 5 & 3	Grace Lenczyk
Helen Holm	(United States) 3 & 2	Estelle Page
Maureen Ruttle	(United States) 3 & 2	Polly Riley
Zara Bolton	(United States) 2 & 1	Dorothy Kielty
1 1/2	Session	4 1/2
2 1/2	Overall	6 1/2
