= Lewis Haggins =

Lewis Haggins Jr (September 23, 1955 – December 23, 2003) was an American homeless leader who co-founded Picture the Homeless.

Born in Princeton, New Jersey, Haggins was living in New York City by the late 1990s. He co-founded Picture the Homeless in 1999 to "change the public perception of the homeless".

Haggins collapsed on a subway in December 2003, and died after being taken to hospital. He was initially buried on Hart Island as a John Doe, but was identified months later and reinterred near his family's home. His story was the impetus for the creation of a memorial service for those buried on Hart Island in 2005.
