= Nan Baird =

Scottish amateur golfer (1911–1993)

Personal information
- Full name: Agnes Steel Baird
- Nationality: Scotland
- Born: 26 May 1911 Prestwick, Scotland
- Died: 25 October 1993 (aged 82) Ayr, Scotland

Career
- Sport: Golf
- Status: Amateur

Agnes Steel "Nan" Baird (married name Wardlaw; 26 May 1911 – 25 October 1993) was a Scottish amateur golfer. She won the 1934 Scottish Women's Amateur Championship and played in the 1938 Curtis Cup.

== Golf career ==
In 1929 Baird became the first Scottish winner of the Girls Amateur Championship when she beat Sylvia Bailey 4&3 in the final at Stoke Poges. She won the West of Scotland Ladies' Championship in 1931, beating Freda Coats by one hole in the final. In 1932 she played for Scotland in the Women's Home Internationals at Saunton.

Baird won the Scottish Women's Amateur Championship in 1934, beating Jessie Anderson by one hole in the final. She was runner-up in 1935, losing to Minnie Robertson-Durham at the 20th hole. She played for Great Britain against France in the 1935 Vagliano Trophy match at Worplesdon, winning her singles match in a close 5–4 win.

Baird played in the 1938 Curtis Cup match at the Essex County Club in Manchester-by-the-Sea, Massachusetts. She did not play on the first day in the foursomes, but played Charlotte Glutting in the singles on the second day. She was two up with three holes to play, but lost the last three holes. Later in the tour she was part of the team that beat Canada 5–2, winning both her matches. Baird was a regular member of the Scottish team in the Women's Home Internationals from 1935 to 1948, making a total of 8 appearances and being part of the winning team four times.

== Personal life ==
Baird married Andrew Mylne Hogg Wardlaw in Prestwick in January 1942. She was give life membership of Prestwick St Nicholas Golf Club. She died in Ayr in October 1993.

== Team appearances ==
- Curtis Cup (representing Great Britain & Ireland): 1938
- Canada–Great Britain match (representing Great Britain & Ireland): 1938 (winners)
- Vagliano Trophy (representing Great Britain & Ireland): 1935 (winners)
- Women's Home Internationals (representing Scotland): 1932, 1935 (winners), 1936, 1937, 1938 (winners), 1939 (winners), 1947 (winners), 1948
