= Veronica Anstey =

English amateur golfer

Personal information
- Full name: Veronica Anstey
- Nationality: England
- Born: 14 January 1935 England
- Died: 4 March 2014 (aged 79) England

Career
- Sport: Golf
- Status: Amateur

Veronica Anstey (married name Beharrell, 14 January 1935 – 4 March 2014) was an English amateur golfer. She played in the 1956 Curtis Cup. A car accident curtailed her playing career.

== Golf career ==
In 1953, Anstey was selected for the England girls team for their annual match against Scotland, played before the Girls Amateur Championship. It was played at Woodhall Spa, England winning 4–3.

In 1955 Anstey played for the English team in the Women's Home Internationals. She won all her three matches. England and Scotland tied their match but Scotland took the title with better results against Ireland and Wales. Anstey was selected as part of a British women's team that toured Australia and New Zealand in the second half of 1955. Because many of the senior players were unavailable, the team turned into a team of five juniors, aged between 18 and 21. Anstey had a successful tour, winning the Victorian Women's Amateur Championship, the Australian Women's Amateur and the New Zealand Women's Amateur Championship. The tour was such a success that the team was awarded the Association of Golf Writers trophy, the first time a team had won the award.

At the end of March 1956, Anstey was selected for the Curtis Cup team. Britain won the match 5–4, their second win in the event. Anstey lost her foursomes match and was not selected for the singles. Anstey also played in the Women's Home Internationals at Sunningdale. In 1957 Anstey played in the Women's Home Internationals and then reached the semi-finals of the Women's Amateur Championship, losing 4&2 to Philomena Garvey.

Anstey has been involved in a car crash after the 1956 Women's Home Internationals. She had made a recovery but suffered from back pain. In 1958 she announced that she was reducing the amount of golf she would play, effectively putting an end to her competitive career at the highest level, although she continued to play golf and be involved in the administrative side of the game.

== Personal life ==
Veronica Anstey married John Beharrell in 1960. Beharrell had won The Amateur Championship in 1956. She died on 4 March 2014.

== Team appearances ==
- Curtis Cup (representing Great Britain & Ireland): 1956 (winners)
- Women's Home Internationals (representing England): 1955, 1956, 1957
- England–Scotland girls match (representing England): 1953 (winners)
