= Meg Farquhar =

British professional golfer (1910–1988)

Margaret Farquhar (April 29, 1910 – November 9, 1988) was the first female professional golfer in Britain when, aged 19, she became assistant to George Smith, the resident Professional at the Moray Golf Club in 1929.

As an assistant professional, Farquhar learned all of the skills that a club professional needed. She was the first woman golf professional in Britain to play in a normally all men national championship on her home course at Lossiemouth. This was the Scottish Professional Championship of 1933 finishing ahead of many of her male colleagues. In recognition of her achievement, she was presented by the True Temper Corporation of America, with a set of the recently introduced steel shafted clubs.

Farquhar married John Alexander Main in 1946 and was reinstated to the amateur game in 1949 and reached the semi-final of the Scottish Women's Amateur Championship, played at Troon of that same year, losing 8&7 to the eventual winner, Jean Donald. She played in all of the Women's Home Internationals in 1950 played in Newcastle, Co. Down winning all of her matches. Again in 1951 she was selected for Scotland, and repeated her achievements of the previous year by winning all her matches. The selectors did not ask her to play again for Scotland although she still continued to play to a very high standard.

She won the Moray championship nine times between 1949 and 1969 while winning the Northern Counties Championship on five occasions.
