= Suzanne Cadden =

Scottish amateur golfer

Personal information
- Full name: Suzanne Olivia Cadden
- Nationality: Scotland
- Born: 8 October 1957 (age 69) Scotland

Career
- Sport: Golf
- Status: Amateur

Suzanne Olivia Cadden (later McMahon, born 8 October 1957) is a Scottish amateur golfer. In 1975 she was runner-up in both the Ladies' British Open Amateur Championship and the Ladies' British Open Amateur Stroke Play Championship. She played in the 1976 Curtis Cup.

== Golf career ==
In 1972, 14-year-old Cadden made her debut for Scotland in the Girls Home Internationals at Royal Norwich, and was runner-up in the subsequent Girls Amateur Championship, losing 2&1 to Maureen Walker in the final. In July 1973 she won the girls 15 to 17 age group at the sixth Junior World Golf Championships, played on the North course at Torrey Pines. She finished on 326, a stroke ahead of Alice Miller a future major championship winner. In 1974 she won the Scottish Girls Championship beating Dale Reid 3&1 in the final. She also made her first appearance in the Women's Home Internationals, Scotland winning narrowly when England lost to Ireland on the final day.

In June 1975 she reached the final of the Ladies' British Open Amateur Championship, losing 3&2 to Nancy Roth Syms on the Old Course at St Andrews. In July she reached the final of the Scottish Girls Championship losing to Wilma Aitken by one hole in the final. In August she won the Girls Amateur Championship beating Lisa Isherwood 4&3 in the final. The following week she was runner-up in the Ladies' British Open Amateur Stroke Play Championship, three strokes behind Julia Greenhalgh. During the year Cadden made her debut for Great Britain & Ireland in the Vagliano Trophy match at Muirfield. She also played for Scotland in the European Ladies' Team Championship in France and both the Girls and Women's Home Internationals. She was the 1975 Daks Woman Golfer of the Year.

Cadden was included in the 1976 Curtis Cup team at Royal Lytham, which was selected in October 1975. The United States won the match, Cadden losing all her four matches. She had further success in girls events, winning the 1976 Scottish Girls Championship for the second time, beating Diane Mitchell in the final. She also won the Scottish Girls' Open Strokeplay Championship, a 54-hole under-21 event, which she also won in 1977.

== Personal life ==
Cadden married John McMahon in 1977. They were later divorced and she reverted to using her maiden name. Her older sister Gladys was also a Scottish international golfer.

== Team appearances ==
- Curtis Cup (representing Great Britain & Ireland): 1976
- Vagliano Trophy (representing Great Britain & Ireland): 1975 (winners)
- European Ladies' Team Championship (representing (Scotland): 1975
- Women's Home Internationals (representing Scotland): 1974 (winners), 1975, 1976, 1977, 1979 (winners)
- Girls Home Internationals (representing Scotland): 1972 (winners), 1973 (winners), 1974, 1975, 1976 (winners)
