= Mary Jestyn Jeffreys =

Welsh golfer (1908–1973)

Personal information
- Full name: Mary Gwynne Jestyn Jeffreys
- Nationality: Wales
- Born: 8 January 1908 Neath, Glamorgan, Wales
- Died: 19 June 1973 (aged 65) Kent, England
- Spouse: Graham Stuart Emery (m. 1935)

Career
- Sport: Golf

Mary Gwynne Jestyn Jeffreys, Mrs Emery (8 January 1908 – 19 June 1973) was a Welsh amateur golfer. She won the Welsh Ladies' Amateur Championship four times in the 1930s. She was in the British team for the 1934 Vagliano Trophy.

== Golf career ==
Jeffrey won the Welsh Ladies' Amateur Championship four times, in 1930, 1931, 1933 and 1937, and was also runner-up three times, in 1932, 1934 and 1938. in 1930 she beat the defending champion, Alison Rieben, by two holes in the 36-hole final. The following year she beat Barbara Pyman, 4&3 in the final. She lost the 1932 final but regained the title in 1933 when she beat Eileen Bridge, 2&1. Her fourth win came in 1937, beating Philomena Whitaker in the final, 10&9, having been 6 up after the morning round.

Jeffreys represented Wales in the Women's Home Internationals each year from 1928 to 1938 and again in 1947. In 1934, she became the first Welsh woman to play in a British team when she competed in the Vagliano Trophy match against France at Chantilly. She lost her foursomes match and was left out of the singles. The match was tied.

== Personal life ==
Jeffreys was born in January 1908 in Neath. the daughter of Albert Jestyn Jeffreys, a Neath solicitor. In October 1935 she married Graham Stuart Emery, a journalist. She died in Kent in June 1973. Graham Emery died the following month.

== Team appearances ==
- Vagliano Trophy (representing Great Britain & Ireland): 1934 (tied)
- Women's Home Internationals (representing Wales): 1928, 1929, 1930, 1931, 1932, 1933, 1934, 1935, 1936, 1937, 1938, 1947
