= Picture the Homeless =

American homeless rights organization

Picture the Homeless (PTH) is an American homeless person–led rights organization founded in 1999 by Lewis Haggins and Anthony Williams. It focuses on human rights, housing, police violence and other social justice issues.

== Profile ==
The group is a nonprofit organization whose goal is to end homelessness. It believes that people who are homeless must become an organized, effective voice for systemic change. PTH attempts to develop leadership among homeless people to impact policies and systems that affect their lives. They also endeavor to create space for them, and their agenda, within the broader social justice movement. They are strong proponents of diverting funds from the New York City Department of Homeless Services out of the shelter system and into community land trusts. To this end, the organization founded a coalition called The New York City Community Land Initiative with The New Economy Project and other groups.

New York Times writer Nikita Stewart in December 2017 described it as "one of the nation's few advocacy organizations founded by homeless people and led by people who are experiencing or have experienced homelessness" and that "the group has made itself a formidable influence on city policy."

In 2011, Picture the Homeless partnered with the Hunter College Center for Community Development to count of vacant buildings and found that the city owned enough buildings to provide housing to all of the homeless. They published the findings in a report titled: Banking on Vacancy. In 2018 Picture the Homeless published a report titled "The Business of Homelessness" that examined the ways public policy, non-profits and businesses acted in ways that perpetuated homelessness.

== Campaigns ==
- Civil Rights – Picture the Homeless is involved in a number of civil rights campaigns with a large focus on anti-police brutality protests and court cases.
- Housing – The organization believes that housing is a human right and that access to housing is in crisis in New York City. Their campaigns have included fighting for affordable housing. Their actions have included occupying buildings and vacant lots.

== International connections ==
In 2009 four members of Picture the Homeless traveled to Budapest, Hungary, to meet homeless and other activists, present their work in New York and to mutually exchange experiences. In Budapest, the group was instrumental in founding Hungary’s first homeless-led advocacy group called A Város Mindenkié (The City is For All).

== Notable people ==
- Lewis Haggins, co-founder
- Jean Rice, member of the board
