= Jean Marks =

American politician from Colorado (1934–2012)

Jean C. Marks (née Coate; 1934–2012) was an American politician from Colorado. She served four terms as a Democrat in the Colorado House of Representatives (1975–1982), where she represented Adams County, Colorado.

Marks received a bachelor's degree from Metropolitan State College. After serving in the legislature, she worked at the University of Colorado Health Center, including as executive director for Colorado Behavioral Healthcare Council.

Jean C. Coate was born in 1934. She had a twin sister (Joan) and four other siblings (Cheryl, Jerry, Bob, Alfred). She married Floyd Marks and had five children: Vickie, Jay David, Susan, Lynda, and Daniel.
