= Jacqueline Gordon =

English amateur golfer (1919–1972)

Personal information
- Full name: Jacqueline Vivienne Victoire Marie Gordon
- Nationality: England
- Born: 6 July 1919 England
- Died: 28 February 1972 (aged 52) Sevenoaks, England

Career
- Sport: Golf
- Status: Amateur

Jacqueline Vivienne Victoire Marie Gordon (6 July 1919 – 28 February 1972) was an English amateur golfer. She lost to Babe Zaharias in the final of the 1947 Women's Amateur Championship and played in the 1948 Curtis Cup.

== Golf career ==
Gordon had some success at the girls level before World War II. She played for England in the England–Scotland girls match in 1936 and 1937 and reached the final of the 1936 Girls Amateur Championship at Stoke Poges, losing 3&2 to Peggy Edwards.

Playing with Tony Duncan, Gordon won the Worplesdon Mixed Foursomes in both 1946 and 1947. In June 1947 she played for the English team in the Women's Home Internationals. England lost to Scotland and finished runners-up. A few days later she reached the final of the Women's Amateur Championship, losing to Babe Zaharias. The match was level after the morning round but Zaharias pulled ahead in the afternoon and won 5&4. Zaharias was the first American winner of the event. In late June she was part of the winning British team for the Vagliano Trophy in Paris.

Gordon was selected for the 1948 Curtis Cup team at Royal Birkdale after a series of trials. The American side won the match, winning 6 matches to 2 with one match halved. Playing with Jean Donald she won her foursomes match but lost to Grace Lenczyk in the singles. In October she again played for Britain against France in the Vagliano Trophy.

Gordon played in the Women's Home Internationals a total of five times, being on the winning side in 1948, 1949 and 1953. In 1952 she was runner-up to Pam Davies in the English Women's Amateur Championship at Royal North Devon, losing 6&5 in the 36-hole final. She won the Worplesdon Mixed Foursomes for the third time in 1953, playing with Graham Knipe, and reached the final again in 1957, partnered with Harold Ridgley.

== Team appearances ==
- Curtis Cup (representing Great Britain & Ireland): 1948
- Vagliano Trophy (representing Great Britain & Ireland): 1947 (winners), 1948 (winners)
- England–Scotland girls match (representing England): 1936, 1937
- Women's Home Internationals (representing England): 1947, 1948 (winners), 1949 (winners), 1952, 1953 (winners)
