= Zara Bolton =

British-born Irish golfer

- in 1956 (fair use)
- Born: Zara Grace Bonner Davis; 1914
- Died: 12 March 1994 (aged 79–80)
- Occupation: Amateur golfer
- Known for: Captaining British Curtis Cup teams

Zara Grace Bonner Bolton (née Davis; 1914 – 12 March 1994) was a British-born Irish golfer. She was the Curtis Cup team captain three times leading the team to victory in 1956.

== Life ==
Bolton moved to Portrush in 1939 after she married. She had visited the Royal Portrush golf club to compete in the British Ladies Amateur Championship and she married an Irish golfer. She had been a member of the Bishop Stortford Golf club before then and an English International based in London. Her husband, Dr Sloane Bolton, lived at Strandmore House, which had one time hosted John F. Kennedy for tea, and that became their home.

Bolton was selected for the 1948 Curtis Cup team at Royal Birkdale after a series of trials. The American side won the match, winning 6 matches to 2 with one match halved. Playing with Philomena Garvey she lost her foursomes match and lost to Dorothy Kielty in the singles. Bolton reached the final of the 1948 English Women's Amateur Championship, losing to Frances Stephens at the 36th hole.

Bolton captained the team which won the Curtis Cup at Prince's Golf Club in Kent in 1956. She was the Curtis Cup team captain three times as she again led the team in 1966 and 1968. The 1966 contest was in America and the 1968 event was in Northern Ireland.

Bolton was captain and president of the Royal Portrees Ladies' Branch. A Zara Bolton Scratch Cup had been competed for since 1986.

== Legacy ==
In 2012, the Royal Portrush Golf Club announced a new 36-hole event that would be open to both men and women. The women's cup was named the Zara Bolton Cup in recognition of Bolton as a leading Irish amateur player.

== Team appearances ==
- Women's Home Internationals (representing England): 1939, 1948 (winners), 1949 (winners), 1950, 1951, 1955, 1956
- Vagliano Trophy (representing Great Britain and Ireland): 1948 (winners)
- Curtis Cup (representing Great Britain and Ireland): 1948, 1956 (non-playing captain, winners), 1966 (non-playing captain), 1968 (non-playing captain)
