= Fragile Minds =

2025 book by Bella Jackson

Fragile Minds: Stories from an NHS Mental Health Ward
- First edition cover
- Author: Bella Jackson
- Language: English
- Publisher: Doubleday
- Publication date: 3 July 2025
- Publication place: London
- Media type: Print, ebook, audiobook
- Pages: 304
- ISBN: 9781529939774 (First edition hardcover)
- OCLC: 1458753121

Fragile Minds: Stories from an NHS Mental Health Ward is a 2025 book authored by Bella Jackson. It was published on 3 July 2025 by Doubleday. It documents her time as a trainee mental health nurse in the NHS, working across an A&E department, an acute psychiatric ward and a community psychiatric team. Whilst it criticises a range of local practices, it also criticises more broadly the diagnostic model in psychiatry and the gulf between psychiatric training and practice.

== Summary ==
Jackson states that, in the UK, we have the commonly accepted view that "the problem with our mental health service is that it’s underfunded and understaffed. But this is not the whole picture." She argues that there is a complex range of problems which mean that in the book "We meet staff who believed they could make a difference, but are worn down by morally ambiguous tasks, impossible workloads and a systemic resistance to change. " Penguin describes the book as "the story of the patients who are failed by hastily made diagnoses, overreliance on medication, coercion, stigma and inconsistency of care, and of the inspiring individuals struggling for justice and revolution."

Jackson has said that she wrote the book for "those asking questions and demanding more, both the survivors of poor treatment and the staff who resist the pressure to conform."

== About the author ==
Jackson has worked in mental health since 2010. She is a registered Mental Health Nurse and Integrative Psychotherapeutic Counsellor. She worked in social care for 5 years prior to commencing her nursing training. She previously worked as a Key Worker for Mind and Kids Company; a Nurse Consultant for Save the Children; a Family Support Worker in London prisons and with detainees seeking asylum; an Independent Mental Health Advocate (IMHA); and as a Mental Health and Neurodiversity Advisor at the University of Oxford.

Jackson currently works as a private therapist, a Specialist Mental Health Mentor, and as a mental health advisor and practitioner in the theatre industry.

== Reception ==
The book received a scathing review by a doctor in the Guardian, who described it as "a furious assault on NHS psychiatry". However, the Guardian received several letters in response to the article which they published online, including a doctor and a consultant clinical psychologist who upheld the views put forward in Jackson's book

Victoria Smith of The Critic, described the book as showing "with great empathy and restraint, the way in which it can become impossible to distinguish between extreme diagnoses justifying extreme treatment, and extreme treatment justifying extreme diagnoses (you wouldn’t do this if they didn’t need it — would you?). I found it to be both shocking and not surprising at all."

Psychiatrist Joanna Moncrieff also reviewed the book favourably in Psychology Today, admitting that she agreed with much of what Jackson described and calling it 'a painful revelation of harsh truths and a call to do better.'
