= Jean Rice =

American advocate for the homeless

Jean Rice (July 1, 1939 – March 12, 2025) was an American advocate for the homeless in New York City. He lived on the streets for three decades. He was on the board of the homeless rights organization Picture the Homeless.

Born in Anderson, South Carolina, Rice moved to Harlem as a young child in 1944. They later moved to Brooklyn, where he attended school before joining the United States Army. In the 1960s, he served time in Attica state prison after shooting and injuring a man in Manhattan. He became homeless in 1987, after the aunt he was living with was murdered.

He earned money picking up cans and bottles, which he redeemed for the five-cent deposit; he also panhandled. He studied at the John Jay College of Criminal Justice, and was a founding Poverty Scholar at Union Theological Seminary.

His story is documented by the Jean Rice Project. The Jean Rice Homeless Liberation Reference Library in Fordham, Bronx, is named after him.
