= Golf in Ireland =

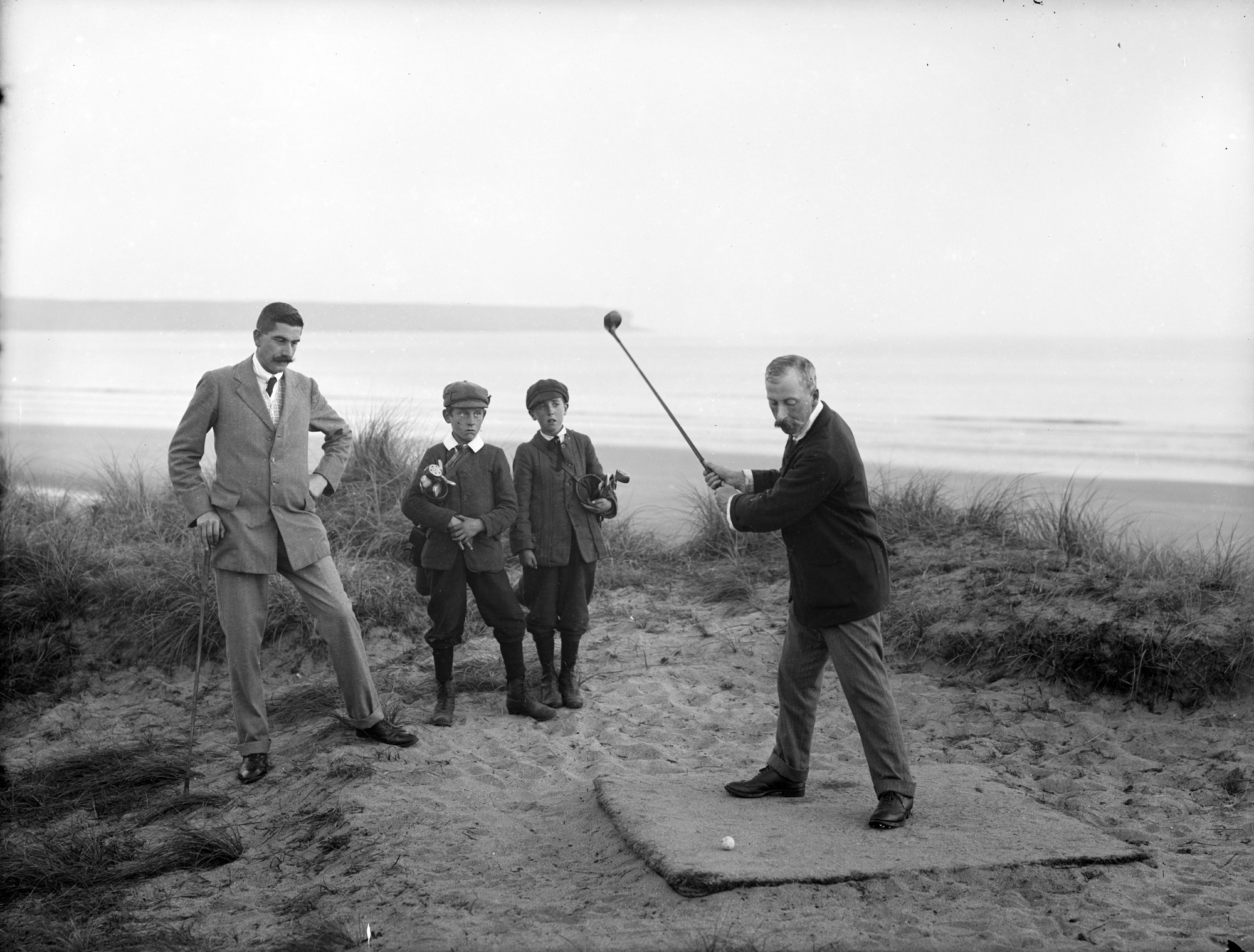
Golfing at Tramore in County Waterford (c.1907)

Golf in Ireland dates to at least the mid-19th century, with the Royal Curragh Golf Club (the first golf club in Ireland) being founded in 1858. The two "oldest governing bodies in world golf", the Golfing Union of Ireland (GUI) and the Irish Ladies Golf Union (ILGU), were formed in 1891 and 1893 respectively. By 2008, the GUI had 166,419 members and the ILGU had 49,822 members, making them the third and seventh largest sports associations in Ireland by membership. Operating as separate (men's and ladies') unions for over 120 years, the two entities merged to form a combined organisation, Golf Ireland, which ratified its first board in early 2021.

As of the 21st century, golf is among the most-played sports in the country, with a 2008 report for the Irish Sports Council ranking golf as the fourth most popular sport by participation rate at that time. As of 2009, Ireland reportedly had the fourth-highest number of golf courses per capita in the world, and a 2012 Fáilte Ireland report stated that overseas visitors to the country spent €183m on golfing activities.

== History of golf in Ireland ==
=== Early development ===
Golf in the modern world originated from a game played on the eastern coast of Scotland during the 15th century. The game later spread throughout the (then) British Empire, including to Ireland. While golf may have been played near Bray in County Wicklow during the 1760s, the game in Ireland largely developed during the mid-19th century, when a number of courses were built. One of the oldest and most popular at this time was the Royal Curragh Golf Club, which was founded in 1858.

=== Formation of amateur organisations ===
The Golfing Union of Ireland (GUI) was established in 1891, making it the oldest national golfing union in the world. Based at Carton House, Maynooth, as of 2018, it represented 430 golf clubs and 170,000 members.

The Irish Ladies' Golf Union (ILGU) was founded in 1893, just two years after the GUI, and is recognised as the "oldest Ladies Golf Union in the world". Based at Sandyford in Dublin, as of 2008 the ILGU had almost 50,000 members.

Following a consultation process which commenced in 2015, and after separate votes by representatives of both the GUI and ILGU, the two "oldest governing bodies in world golf" agreed to form a new joint governing organisation for golf in Ireland. The new combined body, "Golf Ireland", held its first general meeting (and ratified its first board and association president) in February 2021.

=== Professional and other organisations ===
The Professional Golfers' Association (Great Britain and Ireland) was founded in 1901 and is based out of The Belfry, England. It was established to professionalise careers in golf and grow the golf community in Great Britain and Ireland. The Professional Golfers' Association (PGA) initially included 70 members, later growing to over 7,500.

The Confederation of Golf in Ireland (CGI), an umbrella body, was formed by the GUI, ILGU and the PGA to "help advance the sport of golf on the island of Ireland". Formed in 2013, CGI was dissolved following the formation of Golf Ireland in 2021.

== Tournaments ==
The Irish PGA Championship has been held annually at many of the nation's courses since its founding in 1907. It is the oldest tournament in Ireland. The Irish Open is a professional tournament established in 1927. It was revived in 1975 and is now on the European Tour and a qualifying event for the Open Championship. The Irish Amateur Open Championship is a 72-hole stroke play event established in 1892 by the Golfing Union of Ireland. It has been held at the Royal Dublin Golf Club since 2007. The Irish Senior Open is a 54-hole stroke play event in the European Seniors Tour. It was established in 1997. The Volopa Irish Challenge was established in 2015 and is a tournament on the Challenge Tour.

=== Past tournaments held in Ireland ===
- Carroll's International
- Celtic International
- Challenge of Ireland
- Greenore Professional Tournament
- Irish Hospitals Tournament
- Jeyes Tournament
- Kerrygold International Classic
- Ladies Irish Open
- North West of Ireland Open
- Portmarnock Professional Tournament
- R.T.V. International Trophy

== Notable courses ==
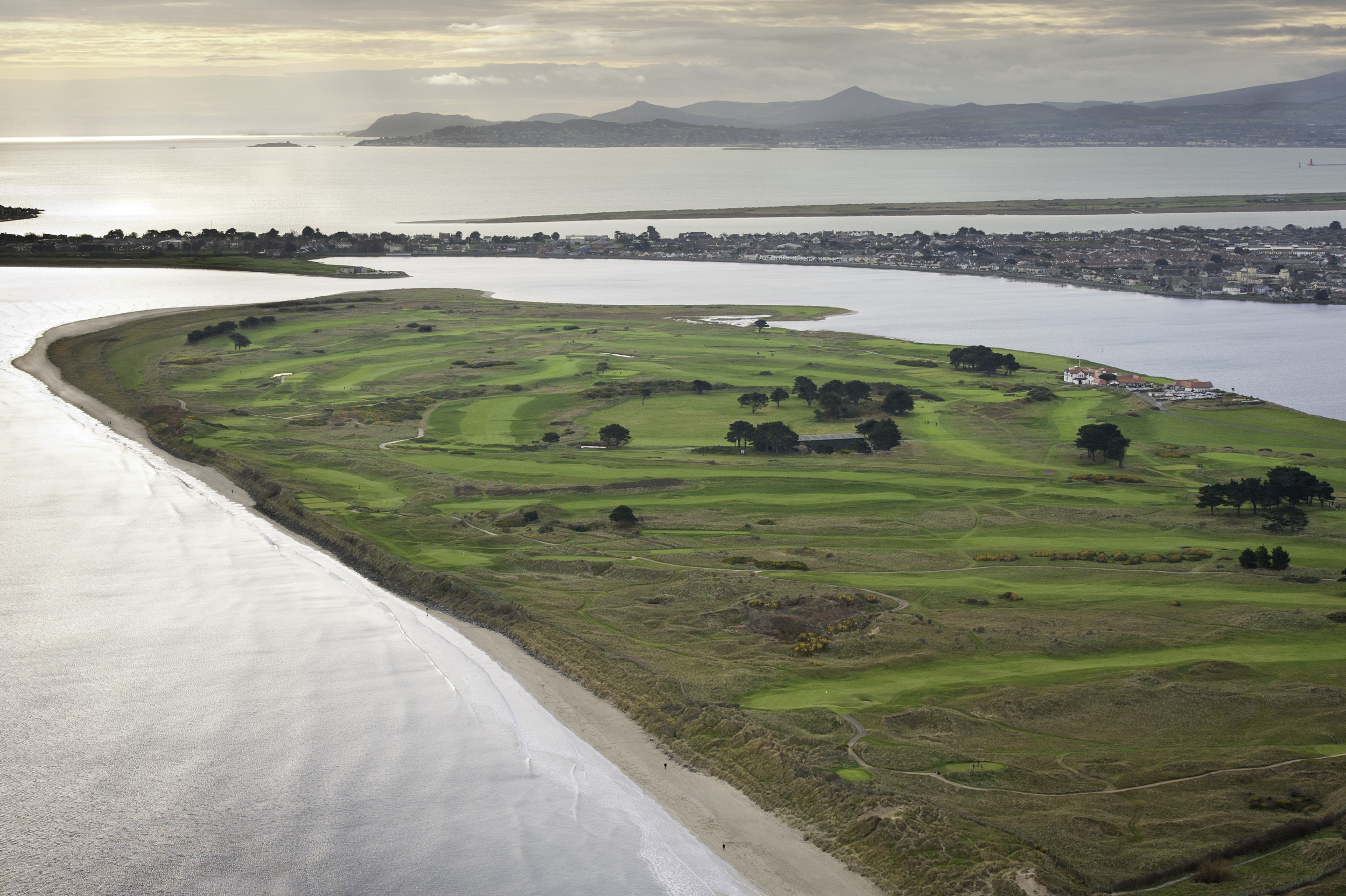
Aerial view of Portmarnock Golf Club and peninsula

There are around 300 different courses on the island of Ireland. Around the entire coast of Ireland are links-style golf courses, played on sandy soils with firm conditions, often with views of the sea while inland there is a wide variety of parkland courses more usually containing trees and water hazards.

There are a number of historic courses in Ireland, whether that be tournament hosting history such as Portmarnock in the Dublin region, which was home to fifteen Irish Opens or Royal Portrush in County Antrim, the only course in Ireland to have held The Open Championship. A number of other clubs and courses were established in the 19th century such as the Royal Curragh Golf Club in Kildare (1858) and Lahinch Golf Club in County Clare (1894). Below is a list of some of the notable courses in Ireland;

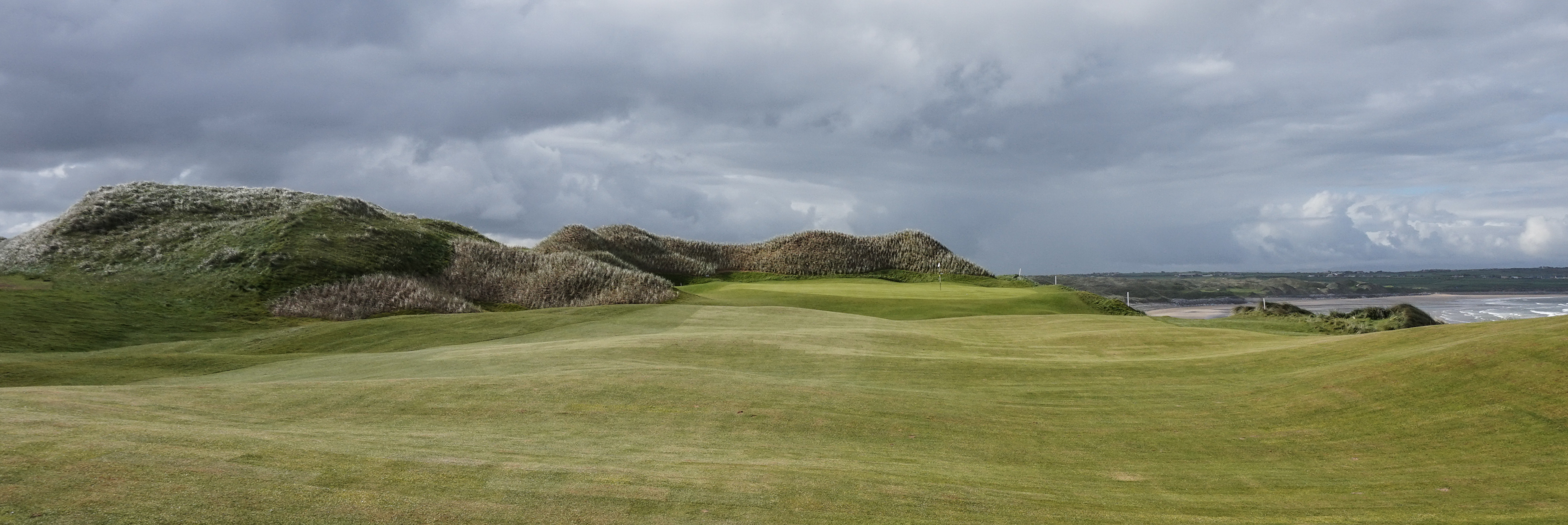
Seventh hole at Ballybunion Golf Club

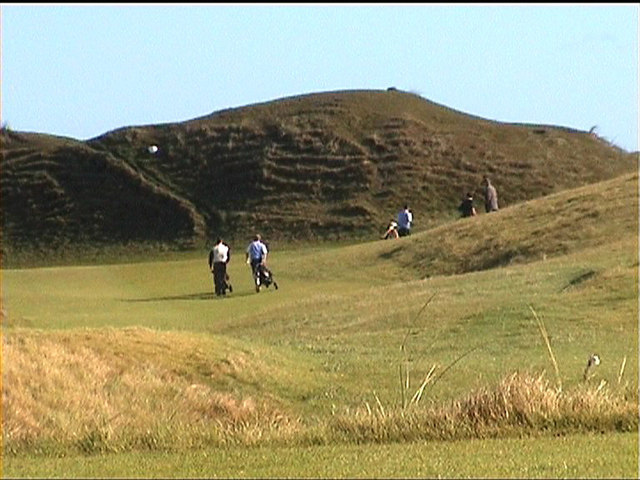
Fourth hole at Lahinch Golf Club

=== Courses in Ireland ===
- Adare Manor Golf Club
- Ballybunion Golf Club (Old)
- Ballyliffin Golf Club (Glashedy)
- Ballyliffin Golf Club (Old)
- Belmullet Golf Club (Carne)
- Blainroe Golf Club
- County Louth Golf Club
- County Sligo Golf CLub (Championship)
- Cork Golf Club
- Donegal Golf Club
- Dooks Golf Club
- Druids Glen Golf Club
- Enniscrone Golf Club(Dunes)
- European Club
- Fota Island Golf Club (Deerpark)
- Headfort Golf Club (New)
- K Club (Palmer)
- Killarney Golf and Fishing Club (Killeen)
- Killeen Castle Golf Club
- Lahinch Golf Club (Old)
- Mount Juliet Golf Course Conrad
- Old Head Golf Links
- Portmarnock Golf Club (Championship)
- Portsalon Golf Club
- Rosapenna Golf Club (Sandy Hills)
- The Island Golf Club
- Tralee Golf Club
- Trump International Golf Links, Doonbeg
- Waterville Golf Club

== Notable golfers ==
Pádraig Harrington was the first golfer from Ireland to win The Open Championship. Rory McIlroy won it in 2014, and Shane Lowry won the 2019 Open Championship when it was played at Royal Portrush in County Antrim. Other notable Irish golfers include: Darren Clarke, Graeme McDowell, Alexander William Shaw (founder of Lahinch and Limerick golf clubs), Rhona Adair (who contributed to the first American book on golfing for women entitled Golf for Women in 1904), Philomena Garvey (who won the British Ladies Amateur competition in 1957), and Paddy Skerritt (winner of the 1970 Alcan International).

=== Irish golfers ===
Other Irish golfers, to have won major amateur championships, professional tour competitions, or have competed for Ireland in the World Cup include:

- Rhona Adair (1878–1961)
- Hugh Boyle (1936–2015)
- Harry Bradshaw (1913–1990)
- Joe Carr (1922–2004)
- Eamonn Darcy (born 1952)
- Pat Doyle (1889–1971)
- Paul Dunne (born 1992)
- Philomena Garvey (1926–2009)
- Pádraig Harrington (born 1971)
- Mabel Harrison (1886–1972)
- Florence Hezlet (c.1884–1945)
- David Higgins (born 1972)
- Jimmy Kinsella (born 1939)
- Peter Lawrie (born 1974)
- Shane Lowry (born 1987)
- Leona Maguire (born 1994)
- Lisa Maguire (born 1994)
- Jimmy Martin (1924–2000)
- Joe McDermott (born 1940)
- Michael McGeady (born 1978)
- Paul McGinley (born 1966)
- Damien McGrane (born 1971)
- Mark McNulty (born 1953)
- Colm Moriarty (born 1979)
- Gary Murphy (born 1972)
- Christy O'Connor Jnr (1948–2016)
- Christy O'Connor Snr (1924–2016)
- John O'Leary (1949–2020)
- James Cecil Parke (1881–1946)
- Paddy Skerritt (1926–2001)
- Des Smyth (born 1953)
- Simon Thornton (born 1977)
- Philip Walton (born 1962)
- Philip Wynne (c.1873–1953)

== See also ==
- Irish Women's Amateur Close Championship
