= Janet Jackson (golfer) =

Irish golfer (1891–1960)

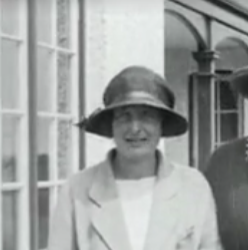
- Born: Arabella Jeanette Charlotte Violet Mowbray Jackson; 28 September 1891; Dublin, Ireland
- Died: 21 November 1960 (aged 69); Berkshire, England
- Occupation: golfer
- Years active: 1911–1935

Arabella Jeanette Charlotte Violet Mowbray "Janet" Jackson (28 September 1891 – 21 November 1960) was an Irish golfer, winner of the Irish Ladies' Amateur Close Championship in 1913, 1914, 1919, 1920, 1923 and 1925.

== Early life and family ==
Jackson was born in 44 Fitzwilliam Square, Dublin on 28 September 1891. She was the daughter of Howard William "Henry" Jackson (1855-1930), barrister-at-law who was originally from County Fermanagh, and Arabella Emily "Bella" Jackson (née Lane-Joynt) from Dublin. Her father went on to become master of the king's bench and later lord chief justice of chancery from 1919 to 1926. He had been an athlete in his youth, playing cricket as well as competing internationally as an oarsman and in rugby, winning the cap against England in 1877. Jackson's mother, Bella, was an accomplished golfer, playing at international competitions for Ireland and in British and Irish championships. Jackson took up golf as a teenager, and became a ladies member of the Island Golf Club in 1908. She was also associated with the Greystones and Royal County Down clubs at times. Her brother, Cyril "Cracker" Jackson, was a tennis player who was the non-playing captain of the 1931 Irish Davis Cup team.

== Golfing career ==
Jackson was a contemporary of Mabel Harrison and Patricia Jameson, and among the best female golfers in Ireland in the early 20th century. Jackson's golfing career spanned from 1911 to 1935. She won the Irish Ladies' Amateur Close Championship six times: 1913 (Lahinch), 1914 (Castlerock), 1919 (Portmarnock), 1920 (Portrush), 1923 (Portmarnock), and 1925 (Lahinch). Winning in 1925 made her the first woman to win the competition six times, overtaking the five championships of May Hezlet. Her unbroken row of four victories from 1913 to 1920, as no competitions were held from 1915 to 1918, equaled that of Rhona Adair. The competition was later renamed the Irish Ladies Golf Championship at her suggestion.

Jackson never won at the British Ladies Amateur. She lost at the semi-finals in 1913, 1920 and 1921, losing by one hole in both 1920 and 1921. She won the Golf Illustrated Gold Vase stroke-play competition in 1921, beating the top British female player of the time, Cecil Leitch, and the U.S. Women's Amateur champion Alexa Stirling. Leitch described Jackson in her autobiography as "a long hitter and one of the best players of the present day. Her whole style implies confidence…and equally good at match and medal play".

Jackson first competed for Ireland at international level in the Women's Home Internationals in 1912, and made her final appearance in 1934. She was the captain of the Island club team which won in the Irish Ladies Senior Cup in 1928, and a team member when they retained the trophy in 1929. She also served as lady captain of the Island in 1921, having been given "scratch" status by the Ladies Golfing Union in 1920. Jackson was also a keen tennis player, winning the Irish Ladies Doubles tennis championship in 1914 and 1919.

She was known for her height and strength in golf, with a long, powerful drive. Not a stylish player, she was described as "a big strong player with a forceful and rather florid style" (Times, 9 May 1914). The courses in Lahinch and Sunningdale best suited her game. Jackson wrote extensively on golf in a number of publications, and was involved in setting the Standard Scratch Score ratings for golf courses in Ireland with the Irish Ladies' Golfing Union in the early 1930s.

== Later life and death ==
In the 1930s, Jackson moved to Sunninghill, Berkshire, close to the Sunningdale Golf Club. She competed regularly in club competitions for Camberley Heath and was a member of the Wentworth Club. She died in Berkshire on 21 November 1960.
