= Cuthell =

Cuthell is a surname. Notable people with the surname include:

- Dick Cuthell (born 1949), English musician and record producer
- Edith Cuthell (1853–1929), English short story writer
- Rhona Cuthell, a.k.a. Kathleen Adair (1881–1961), Irish amateur golfer
