= Caroline Fraser Manice =

American golfer (1871–1929)

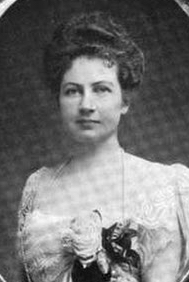
- Caroline Fraser Manice, from a 1901 publication
- Born: Caroline Fraser; June 10, 1871; New York City, New York, U.S.
- Died: January 11, 1929 (aged 57)
- Other name: Mrs. E. A. Manice
- Occupation: golfer
- Years active: 1898–1909

Caroline Fraser Manice (June 10, 1871 – January 11, 1929) was an American golfer.

== Early life ==
Caroline Fraser was born in New York City, the daughter of William Andrew Fraser and Lena Appleton Fraser.

== Career ==
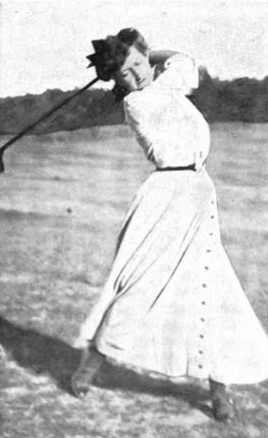
Caroline Fraser Manice in action, from a 1901 publication

Manice, a member of the Baltusrol Golf Club, was considered one of the top ten women golfers in the United States in 1901, with a strong long game and an orthodox full swing. She won the driving competition at Ardsley in 1898. She played several years at the U.S. Women's Amateur; in 1899 she was disqualified for taking advice from a caddie; in 1900 she was described as a "dark horse". In 1901, she lost in the semi-finals to the eventual champion, Genevieve Hecker. She lost at the Nationals again in 1902. She won the Women's Metropolitan Golf Association Championship at the Apawamis Club for three straight years, from 1902 to 1904. In 1902 she also won a championship in Florida. In 1904 she was president of the Women's Metropolitan Golf Association.

Manice was also an amateur swimmer, sailor, and tennis player. "'Sportswoman' is a term that does not appeal to me," she told a newspaper in 1904, "but it seems inevitable in these days, to describe the women who find health and rational enjoyment in open-air games." In 1905, Manice experienced health problems described as "extreme nervousness," attributed to her golfing. She sailed to Europe for rest and recovery, and announced that she would never play golf again. However, she played again in 1906 and in inter-city competition in 1909.

== Personal life ==
Caroline Fraser married stockbroker Edward Augustus Manice in 1891. Their daughter, Dorothy Jean, was born in 1892. In December 1905, Caroline Manice was injured in a fatal automobile accident in Flushing, New York.

Caroline Fraser Manice was widowed in 1925 and died at 57 in 1929. In 1937, her daughter, Dorothy J. Manice, founded the Titleholders Championship, one of the early tournaments for women professional golfers in the United States.
