= Irish Women's Amateur Close Championship =

Tournament information
- Location: Ireland
- Established: 1894
- Organised by: Golf Ireland
- Format: Match play

Current champion
- Canice Screene

The Irish Women's Amateur Close Championship is the women's national amateur match play golf championship of Ireland. It was first played in 1894 and is currently organised by Golf Ireland.

The Irish Women's Amateur Close Championship is contested through two phases. It begins with a 36-hole stroke play competition, with the leading 32 competitors progressing to the knock-out match play competition.

It is a close event, entry being restricted to women born on the island of Ireland, or with one parent or grandparent born on the island of Ireland, or resident on the island of Ireland for five years. In addition, players must not have played for another country's international team or in another country's close championship, except at the under-18 or younger level.

== Winners ==
Year	Winner	Score	Runner-up	Venue	Ref
2024	Canice Screene	2 & 1	Emma O'Driscoll	Roscommon	
2023	Sara Byrne	1 up	Beth Coulter	Connemara	
2022	Beth Coulter	6 & 5	Sara Byrne	Grange	
2021	Anna Foster	2 & 1	Beth Coulter	Ballybunion	
2020	Not held				
2019	Annabel Wilson	19 holes	Paula Grant	Woodbrook	
2018	Sara Byrne	2 & 1	Louise Coffey	Enniscrone	
2017	Paula Grant	3 & 1	Ciara Casey	Mullingar	
2016	Olivia Mehaffey	1 up	Louise Coffey	Lahinch	
2015	Sarah Helly	6 & 5	Olivia Mehaffey	Rosapenna	
2014	Mary Doyle	2 & 1	Jessica Carty	Enniscrone	
2013	Paula Grant	19 holes	Lisa Maguire	Ballybunion	
2012	Leona Maguire	2 up	Stephanie Meadow	County Louth	
2011	Danielle McVeigh	19 holes	Karen Delaney	Carlow	
2010	Mary Dowling	1 up	Lisa Maguire	Portstewart	
2009	Lisa Maguire	5 & 4	Mary Dowling	Fota Island	
2008	Leona Maguire	3 & 2	Lisa Maguire	Westport	
2007	Karen Delaney	3 & 2	Marian Riordan	Lahinch	
2006	Tricia Mangan	2 & 1	Martina Gillen	The European Club	
2005	Tricia Mangan	3 & 2	Catherine Tucker	Portsalon	
2004	Deirdre Smith	20 holes	Tara Delaney	The Island	
2003	Martina Gillen	2 up	Maria Dunne	Donegal	
2002	Rebecca Coakley	4 & 3	Alison Coffey	Cork	
2001	Alison Coffey	4 & 3	Claire Coughlan	The European Club	
2000	Alison Coffey	3 & 1	Suzanne O'Brien	County Louth	
1999	Claire Coughlan	4 & 3	Eileen Rose Power	Carlow	
1998	Lillian Behan	19 holes	Oonagh Purfield	Clandeboye	
1997	Suzanne Fanagan	4 & 3	Eileen Rose Power	Enniscrone	
1996	Barbara Hackett	3 & 2	Lillian Behan	Tramore	
1995	Eileen Rose Power	1 up	Sheena O'Brien Kenney	Cork	
1994	Laura Webb	20 holes	Hazel Kavanagh	County Sligo	
1993	Eavan Higgins	1 up	Aideen Rogers	Royal Belfast	
1992	Eileen Rose Power	1 up	Claire Hourihane	County Louth	
1991	Claire Hourihane	2 up	Eileen Rose McDaid	Ballybunion	
1990	Eileen Rose McDaid	2 & 1	Lesley Callen	The Island	
1989	Mary McKenna	19 holes	Carol Wickham	Westport	
1988	Laura Bolton	2 & 1	Eavan Higgins	Tramore	
1987	Claire Hourihane	5 & 4	Catherine Hickey	Lahinch	
1986	Therese O'Reilly	4 & 3	Eavan Higgins	Castlerock	
1985	Claire Hourihane	4 & 3	Mary McKenna	Waterville	
1984	Claire Hourihane	19 holes	Maureen Madill	County Sligo	
1983	Claire Hourihane	6 & 4	Valerie Hassett	Cork	
1982	Mary McKenna	2 & 1	Maureen Madill	Royal Portrush	
1981	Mary McKenna	1 up	Mary Kenny	Laytown & Bettystown	
1980	Claire Nesbitt	19 holes	Claire Hourihane	Lahinch	
1979	Mary McKenna	6 & 5	Claire Nesbitt	Donegal	
1978	Mary Gorry	4 & 3	Ita Butler	Grange	
1977	Mary McKenna	2 up	Rhona Hegarty	Ballybunion	
1976	Claire Nesbitt	20 holes	Mary McKenna	County Sligo	
1975	Mary Gorry	1 up	Elaine Bradshaw	Tramore	
1974	Mary McKenna	3 & 2	Vivienne Singleton	Lahinch	
1973	Maisie Mooney	3 & 1	Mary McKenna	Bundoran	
1972	Mary McKenna	5 & 4	Ita Butler	Killarney	
1971	Elaine Bradshaw	3 & 1	Maisie Mooney	County Louth	
1970	Philomena Garvey	2 & 1	Moira Earner	Royal Portrush	
1969	Mary McKenna	3 & 2	Catherine Hickey	Ballybunion	
1968	Elaine Bradshaw	4 & 3	Mary McKenna	Lahinch	
1967	Gwen Brandom	3 & 2	Pat O'Sullivan	Castlerock	
1966	Elaine Bradshaw	3 & 2	Pat O'Sullivan	Rosslare	
1965	Elizabeth Purcell	3 & 2	Pat O'Sullivan	Mullingar	
1964	Zelie Fallon	37 holes	Pat O'Sullivan	Royal Portrush	
1963	Philomena Garvey	9 & 7	Elizabeth Barnett	Killarney	
1962	Philomena Garvey	7 & 6	Moira Earner	County Louth	
1961	Kitty MacCann	5 & 3	Ann Sweeney	Royal County Down	
1960	Philomena Garvey	5 & 4	Kitty MacCann	Cork	
1959	Philomena Garvey	12 & 10	Heather Colhoun	Lahinch	
1958	Philomena Garvey	7 & 6	Zelie Fallon	Carlow	
1957	Philomena Garvey	3 & 2	Kitty MacCann	Royal Portrush	
1956	Pat O'Sullivan	13 & 12	Girlie Hegarty	Killarney	
1955	Philomena Garvey	10 & 9	Audrey O'Donohoe	County Sligo	
1954	Philomena Garvey	13 & 12	Dorothy Glendinning	Portmarnock	
1953	Philomena Garvey	8 & 7	Girlie Hegarty	Rosslare	
1952	Dorothy Forster	3 & 2	Kitty MacCann	Royal County Down	
1951	Philomena Garvey	12 & 10	Dorothy Forster	Ballybunion	
1950	Philomena Garvey	6 & 4	Jean Marks	County Sligo	
1949	Kitty Smye	9 & 7	Dorothy Beck	County Louth	
1948	Philomena Garvey	9 & 7	Clarrie Reddan	Rosslare	
1947	Philomena Garvey	5 & 4	Kitty Smye	Royal Portrush	
1946	Philomena Garvey	39 holes	Clarrie Reddan	Lahinch	
1940–1945: Not played due to World War II
1939	Chrystabell MacGeagh	1 up	Ena Gildea	Bundoran	
1938	Dorothy Beck	5 & 4	Bridget Jackson	Portmarnock	
1937	Dorothy Glendinning	37 holes	Ida Kidd	Royal Portrush	
1936	Clarrie Tiernan	7 & 6	Sybil Moore	Ballybunion	
1935	Daisy Ferguson	2 & 1	Betty Ellis	Rosapenna	
1934	Pat Sherlock	3 & 2	Pat Walker	Portmarnock	
1933	Eithne Pentony	3 & 2	Fanny Blake	Royal County Down	
1932	Betty Latchford	7 & 5	Daisy Ferguson	Ballybunion	
1931	Eithne Pentony	3 & 2	Nancy Todd	County Sligo	
1930	Pat Walker	2 & 1	Patsy Jameson	Portmarnock	
1929	Mrs Harry Hall	1 up	Iris Taylor	Rosapenna	
1928	Agnes Dwyer	3 & 2	Sybil Clarke	Cork	
1927	Molly McLoughlin	2 up	Fanny Blake	Royal Dublin	
1926	Patsy Jameson	5 & 3	C.H. Murland	Royal County Down	
1925	Janet Jackson	2 & 1	Sheelagh Jameson	Lahinch	
1924	Sheila Thornton	4 & 3	Genevieve Hewitt	Castlerock	
1923	Janet Jackson	5 & 4	Mrs Babington	Portmarnock	
1922	Stella Gotto	2 up	Maisie Hirsch	Royal County Down	
1921	Wanda Stuart-French	4 & 3	May Fitzgibbon	Hermitage	
1920	Janet Jackson	5 & 4	Florence Cramsie	Royal Portrush	
1919	Janet Jackson	5 & 4	Marion Alexander	Portmarnock	
1915–1918: Not played due to World War I
1914	Janet Jackson	3 & 2	Rose Meldon	Castlerock	
1913	Janet Jackson	4 & 3	Mabel Harrison	Lahinch	
1912	Mabel Harrison	5 & 3	Florence Cramsie	Portsalon	
1911	Mabel Harrison	6 & 4	Florence Walker-Leigh	Malahide	
1910	Mabel Harrison	5 & 4	Jessie Magill	Royal County Down	
1909	Amy Ormsby	4 & 2	Violet Hezlet	Lahinch	
1908	May Hezlet	5 & 4	Florence Hezlet	Royal Portrush	
1907	Florence Walker-Leigh	4 & 3	May Fitzgibbon	Royal Dublin	
1906	May Hezlet	2 & 1	Florence Hezlet	Royal County Down	
1905	May Hezlet	2 & 1	Florence Hezlet	Portsalon	
1904	May Hezlet	4 & 2	Florence Walker-Leigh	Lahinch	
1903	Rhona Adair	7 & 5	Violet Hezlet	Royal Portrush	
1902	Rhona Adair	9 & 7	Maud Stuart	Royal County Down	
1901	Rhona Adair	4 & 2	Florence Walker-Leigh	Portmarnock	
1900	Rhona Adair	9 & 7	Violet Hezlet	Portrush	
1899	May Hezlet	5 & 4	Rhona Adair	Newcastle	
1898	Jessie Magill	1 up	May Hezlet	Malone	
1897	Nellie Graham	4 & 3	Jessie Magill	Dollymount	
1896	Nellie Graham	4 & 3	Edith Brownrigg	Newcastle	
1895	Helen Cox	3 & 2	Miss MacLaine	Royal Portrush	
1894	Clara Mulligan	3 & 2	Nellie Graham	Carnalea	
