= The Apawamis Club =

Country club in New York state

- Location in the United States
- 40°59′16″N 73°41′33″W

Club information
- Location: Rye, New York; United States
- Established: 1890
- Type: Private
- Total holes: 18
- Tournaments: 1911 U.S. Amateur
- Website: The Apawamis Club
- Designed by: Tom Bendelow (1899); Willie Davis & Maturin Ballou (1899-1900); Willie Dunn Jr. Herbert Strong (1906); Gil Hanse (2001); Keith Foster (2017)
- Par: 72
- Length: 6,741 yd (6,164 m) Longest hole is #9 - 600 yd (550 m)

The Apawamis Club is a private country club located in Rye, New York, Westchester County, long known for its 18-hole golf course and prominence in the sport of squash. The 1911 U.S. Amateur was contested here, resulting in a playoff between the reigning British Amateur champion, Harold Hilton, and his lesser-known American opponent, Fred Herreshoff. Apawamis is also the home base of a nationally recognized junior squash program and hosts the world renowned Briggs Cup tournament.

== Club Founding and History ==
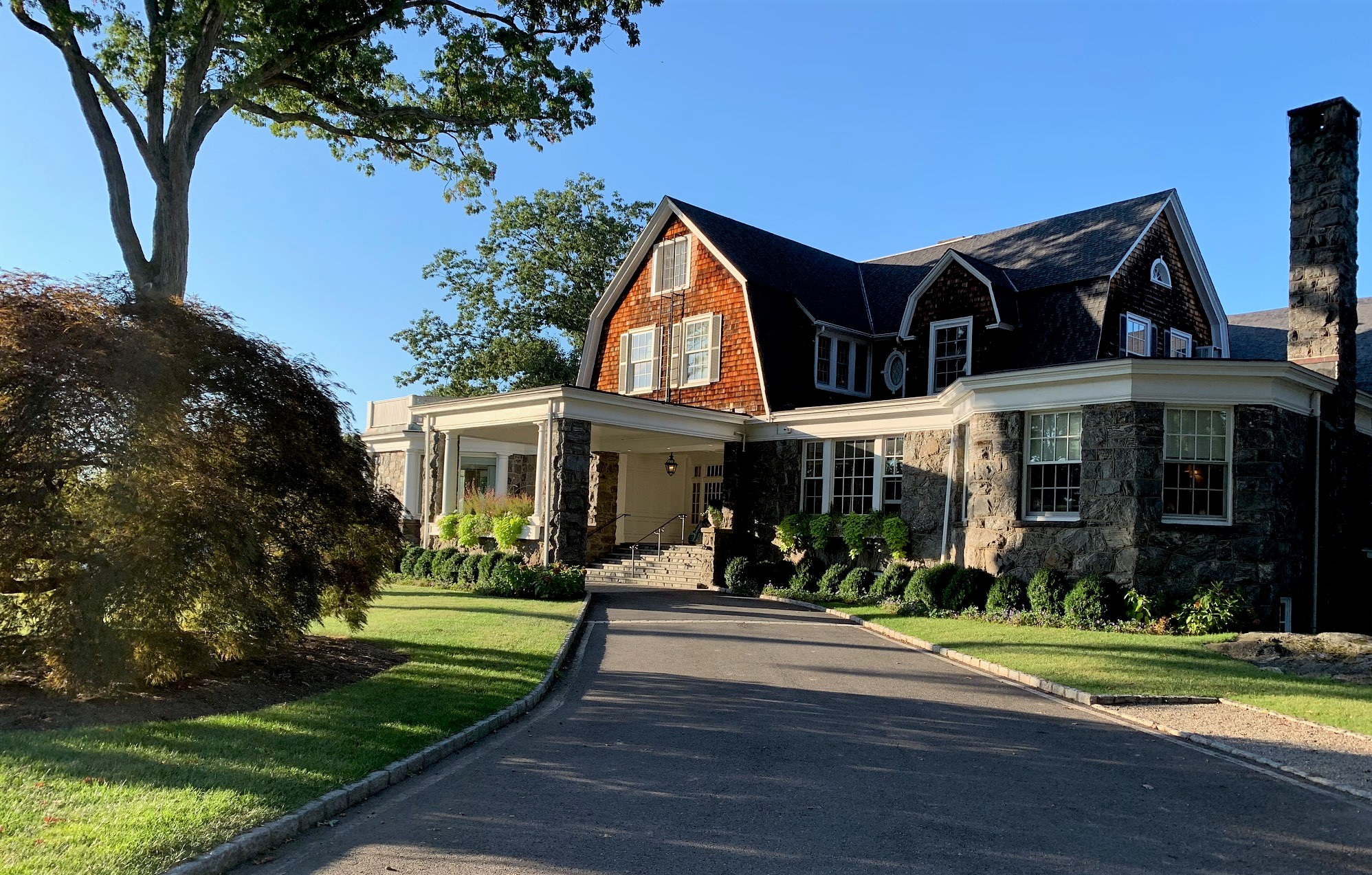
Apawamis Clubhouse

The Apawamis Club was originally founded on June 25, 1890 as a social organization by a group of 40 gentlemen from Rye and the surrounding towns. Their shared goal was “to improve both the physical and moral tone of the village”. The club was named after an area in Rye dubbed Apawamis by the Native Americans. The name is derived from the words "appoqua" which means “to cover” and "mis" meaning “the trunk of a tree” – together the name implies “the covering tree”.

Located in a residential area of Rye between Club Road and Highland Road, Apawamis abuts two historic neighborhoods. Its property boasts one significant National Register eligible structures. The current Apawamis clubhouse was completed in 1908, and built of stone, replacing a previous wooden structure consumed by fire in February 1907. The structure was designed by Frank A. Moore and the cornerstone was laid sometime after Thanksgiving 1907.

A structure once known as the Apawamis "Manager's House" was built in 1895 and moved to Highland Road. It belonged to one of the founding members of the club, Henry W. Cooper. As Treasurer of the Apawamis Board, Cooper was instrumental in the purchase of the club's current property in 1899. The building was torn down in May 2023.

== Golf Course Design History ==
Apawamis' transition from a social club to a golf club took off in 1899. The club had started out with a nine hole course on Boston Post Road in 1897. After two or so years of popular use of the course, the officers of the club were faced with a challenge – the cost of renewing their lease was deemed too high and demand to play the sport showed no signs of ebbing. As a result, in February 1899, members announced that they would purchase 120 acres of the former Charles Park estate (the Park family were Apawamis members) close to the Rye train station to create the venue that exists today.

The new 18-hole "Golf Course "for Millionaires" created for members like American politician and journalist Whitelaw Reid and Standard Oil industrialist Henry Flagler was laid out by Tom Bendelow. At 6280 yards, it was poised to be one of the longest of its kind in the country. Membership, which at this time was 300 members, was anticipated to expand to 1,000 members. It was also decided that a new clubhouse based on the structure at the Atlantic City Country Club would be erected after the golf course was finished. E. S. Gage was the architect selected for the clubhouse. Costs for the entire project, buildings and greens, were estimated at $100,000.

The expansive links opened informally to great acclaim on May 13, 1899 in a match against Westchester Golf Club. The newly elected captain of the 1899 Apawamis Golf Club team was Herbert A. Sherman. Other players on his winning team included Frank H. Wiggin, Maturin Ballou, Victor Delano, S. W. Doubleday, R.F. Mathews and Roger Samson. The home matches that followed were played on May 20, 1899 against Richmond County Country Club; on June 3, 1899 against Bedford Golf; and on June 10, 1899 against Wee Burn Golf Club. The clubhouse itself opened on October 7, 1899 with 700 members and guests in attendance. The "cosey" structure was two stories tall with a large piazza.

Over the last 120 years, many notable golf course architects, club pros and amateurs have left their signature on the Apawamis golf links:

=== Tom Bendelow ===
The original 18-hole course at Apawamis was first laid out by Scottish architect Tom Bendelow. It was largely completed by May 13, 1899. Bendelow, who has been called the "Dean of American Golf", had recently designed New York City's public course at Van Cortlandt Park and had been hired as the superintendent of the site.

Later in August 1899, newspapers shared "glowing accounts" about the design's "undulating nature" and told readers that ""Tom" Bendelow is now busily engaged putting on the finishing touches to it." The natural contours of the well-tended pasture land spoke to Bendelow's aesthetic philosophy and also helped expedite installation of the greens and holes. Bendelow took advantage of two existing brooks and a pond on the Park Estate to create water hazards. Three of the holes were made to be over 500 yards and the ninth hole, the longest, came in at 580 yards. With a total length of 6,280 yards, Bendelow's design instantly made the new Apawamis course one of the longest in the country at the time and a must play destination later lauded by Bendelow's friend and world champion Harry Vardon. The length of each original hole was as follows: IN 240, 350, 120, 380, 520, 350, 420, 200, 580 OUT 460, 390, 300, 275, 565, 240, 160, 330, 400. The course was instantly acclaimed as championship caliber and compared favorably for being "as nearly as long as old St. Andrews and longer than Hoylake, Sandwich, and Muirfield." By 1901, newspapers lauded the links at Apawamis as "ideal" and called Bendelow's course "Among the Best in the Country".

At least six of Bendelow's courses have since been recognized by the United States Department of the Interior and added to the National Register of Historic Places. In fact, Bendelow's design for City Park Golf Course, Baton Rouge, Louisiana, was the first golf course awarded such an honor in the history of the National Park Service.

=== Maturin Ballou ===
In November 1899, working with the club's newly hired golf professional Willie Davis, Maturin Ballou, an Apawamis Club member and player on the golf team, oversaw the installation of a new drainage system. Ballou had the opportunity to show off his handiwork the following year to Harry Vardon on November 6, 1900, in a best ball exhibition match with Davis. After playing, Vardon announced that Apawamis was one of the three best courses he had seen in the country after Newport and Atlantic City.

Ballou eventually became USGA secretary from 1902-1903 as well as the president of Apawamis. In 1910, he was given a rare honorary membership at Apawamis in recognition that he was "instrumental in bringing the club links up to their ... excellent condition." Some refinements of Bendelow's course are also said to have taken place at the suggestion of Willie Dunn Jr. in collaboration with Ballou..

=== William "Willie" Davis ===
William "Willie" Davis was one of Apawamis' earliest resident pros and also left his design imprint on the course. Davis received an offer to join the club in the fall of 1899. When he started in November 1899, he brought with him proven experience in golf course design, having laid out the first 12-hole short course at Shinnecock Hills, Long Island in June 1891 over a period of approximately one month. Davis had also planned the links at Newport Country Club in 1894 and 1899 where he was previously a resident professional.

By July 1900, Davis had made some changes to the Apawamis links that Bendelow had originally laid out. "'Willie' Davis' Work" included shortening several holes but also increasing the ninth hole in length to 600 yards. The resulting total yardage was 6205. Names of the holes included Fairview, Waterloo and Consolation. Davis made news on July 21, 1900 when he broke his own record on the course. Davis' record score of 78 was something that even famed British golfer Harry Vardon could not best.

At Apawamis, Davis also found support as he worked to establish a championship tournament specifically for golf professionals at clubs on the East Coast. Together with fellow pro Willie Norton of Lakewood Golf Club and Deal Beach, he rallied 44 professionals to create a petition for presentation to the Metropolitan Golf Association in 1901. Apawamis member Maturin Ballou supported the concept believing "the competition as proposed would be a good thing in every way." However the MGA Executive Committee disagreed and Davis and the pros were turned down in April of the same year. Davis' dream did not come to pass until 1906.

When Davis died in Rye at the untimely age of 39, he was credited as being the oldest resident golf professional in the United States and the first to have come to America to make a living as a golfer. He succumbed to pneumonia in 1902.

=== Thomas Chisolm ===
Chisolm, a British golfer from a course near old Rye, England was hired in April 1902 by Apawamis to take Davis' role for one season before being replaced by Willie Anderson.

=== Willie Anderson ===
Apawamis was the home course for golfing great Willie Anderson for three seasons from 1903 through 1905. His 1901 US Open victory made Anderson much sought after by clubs including Baltusrol Golf Club where he applied. Weighing his choices, on March 23, 1903, he ultimately signed a contract with Apawamis. Anderson remains the only golfer to win three consecutive US Opens.

In November 1905, Anderson signed with the Onwentsia Club in Chicago to be their pro for the 1906 season but only stayed one season. Moving from club to club, he died suddenly in 1910 of hardening of the arteries; he was only 31. Herbert Strong was hired as the head professional to take his place at Apawamis.

=== Herbert Strong ===
Herbert Strong, an English golfer, made changes to the Apawamis golf course, which included adding bunkers, between 1906 and 1911 in preparation for the 1911 U.S. Amateur. When the cornerstone for the new clubhouse was laid, among the items included in a sealed box was a card recording Strong's professional record score of 71 in July 1907 on the course. Strong would later be a founding member of the PGA.

=== Gil Hanse and Keith Foster ===
The course was altered again in 2001 by Gil Hanse and later in 2017 by Keith Foster. Extensive capital changes were made to the fairways, driving range and bunkers; a practice putting green, short game practice area, and indoor Golf Performance Center were added.

== Golf Facts ==
On February 28, 1901, Apawamis officially joined the USGA with Golf Chairman Maturin Ballou acting as delegate.

Women have always played a significant role in the golf culture of the club so much so that in 1899, the construction of an additional 9-hole course just for women was contemplated but never realized. While not originally considered Active Members, they were placed in a category called Associate Members and had access to the links.

The course's most visually distinctive hole is #4, dubbed "Eleanor's Teeth" after First Lady Eleanor Roosevelt.

The Green Meadow Golf Club was an offshoot of Apawamis and formed in 1917 directly adjacent to Apawamis but with frontage on North Street. In fact, in 1927 the two clubs considered consolidating. The course was designed by Devereux Emmet. Today, the former Green Meadow Golf Club is known as Willow Ridge Country Club.

== Golf Tournaments at Apawamis Club ==
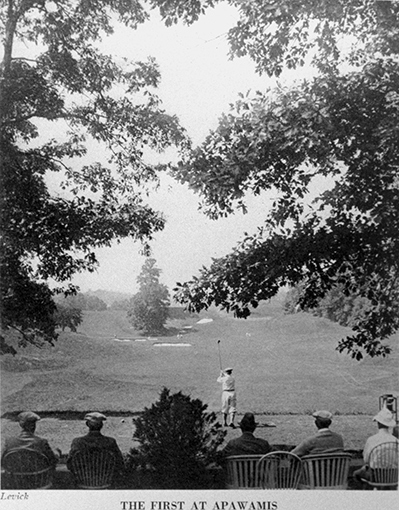
Harold Hilton hitting a drive on the first hole at The Apawamis Club in the 1911 U.S. Amateur

Apawamis has historically boasted strong fields in tournament play for both men and women. Women and men have also played each other on the links including a notable 1902 match with national champion Genevieve Hecker leading the women's team.

- 1903-1905 Women's Metropolitan Golf Association Championship
  (Winner: Caroline Fraser Manice)
- Julian Curtiss Cup match, a series held exclusively between clubs that are more than 100 years old
- 1909 NCAA Yale vs. Princeton
  (Winner: Princeton)
- 1911 U.S. Amateur

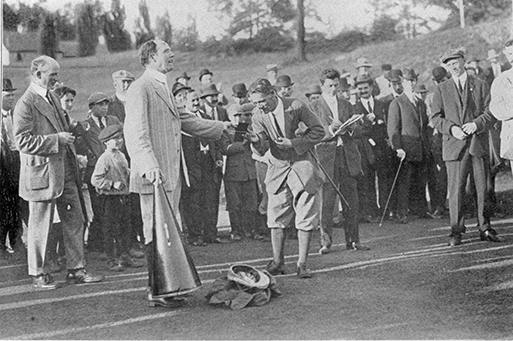
Trophy presentation to Harold Hilton, winner of the 1911 U.S. Amateur, by Silas H. Strawn, President of the USGA

The 1911 U.S. Amateur was contested at Apawamis Club in 1911, resulting in a playoff between the reigning British Amateur champion, Harold Hilton, and his lesser-known American opponent, Fred Herreshoff. The field was laden with a number of fine players, such as Francis Ouimet and Walter Travis, but they could not keep pace with Hilton and Herreshoff. Ouimet would later win the U.S Open in 1913 at The Country Club in Brookline, Massachusetts.

Herreshoff defeated Chick Evans in the semi-finals. He was trailing Hilton by six holes in the final match but managed to mount a stunning comeback to tie the match and send it to a playoff. On the 37th hole of the match, Hilton sliced his approach shot badly but instead of finding the deep rough right of the green his ball ricocheted off a flat rock and luckily landed on the green. Herreshoff, meanwhile, topped his approach shot to a position short of the green. His pitch shot to the par 4 hole went 20 feet past the pin. Hilton two-putted for par while Herreshoff was unable to make his 20-foot putt to save par. Hilton was declared the winner and was awarded the Havemeyer Cup, a trophy given to the USGA by golf enthusiast and millionaire sugar dealer Theodore Havemeyer. Havemeyer, who died in 1897, served as the first president of the USGA.

- 1912 Metropolitan Open
  (Winner: Tom McNamara) ^{†}
- 1928 NCAA Princeton vs. Georgetown
  (Winner: Princeton)
- 1952 Today's PGA Northern Trust tournament had its beginnings at Apawamis as a one-day pro-amateur benefiting the now defunct United Hospital of Port Chester. Founded by William Mitchell "Bill" Jennings, it was the precursor of the Thunderbird Classic and quickly became a "Westchester Classic". Called the "biggest, little golf tournament in the U.S.A." by Guido Cribari in 1960, the tournament attracted an historic field of players that included Arnold Palmer, Sam Snead and Jay Hebert along with local pros like Jim Turnesa. It later moved to Westchester Country Club.
- 1970 U.S. Girls' Junior
  (Winner: Hollis Stacy)
- 1978 Curtis Cup
- 2005 U.S. Senior Women's Amateur
  (Winner: Diane Lang)

== Squash ==
In 1904, Apawamis built one of the first squash houses in the country demonstrating its early commitment to this winter sport. As a result, the club's squash program now stands as the third oldest in the US. Apawamis was one of the 25 founding clubs of the National Squash Tennis Association in 1911 and an Apawamis member, Dr. Alfred Stillman, was the first and second winner of the NSTA championship in 1911. Successive expansions of the squash facilities were endorsed by members in 1929 making the facilities the most modern in the country and again in 1938 at which time the building offered two regulation singles courts and one doubles court. Famous women players of the sport at that time included Agnes Lamme, 3 time winner of the Metropolitan Squash Racquets Championship and a winner of the National Doubles Championship with her partner and future Squash Hall of Famer Ann Page.

More than 115 years later, Apawamis squash instructors regularly train nationally ranked male and female students. Many of its junior players have gone on to compete at or become captains of numerous top collegiate teams including Harvard, Stanford, Yale, Princeton, Amherst College, Williams College, Hamilton College and University of Virginia. The squash facilities were most recently updated in the 2000s.

In addition to singles squash, Apawamis is home to the competitive biennial Briggs Doubles Cup named for the club's longtime Director of Squash and US Squash Hall of Famer, Peter Briggs. The Briggs Cup is the largest doubles tournament in the world and benefits disadvantaged youth through the CitySquash charity. It has attracted #1 world ranked Professional Squash Association players like Nicol David, Amanda Sobhy and Natalie Grainger. The #1 Men's Double Champions in the world Damien Mudge and Manek Mathur have also played regularly at Apawamis.

== Tennis and Paddle Tennis ==
In addition to golf and squash and other amenities offered for members and guests, the club has tennis and paddle tennis courts. Members participate in local inter-club competitions.

== Beach Club [defunct] ==
On July 14, 1934 Apawamis inaugurated a Beach Club on Milton Point, at the intersection of Forest Avenue and Van Wagenen Place, which survived through the 1960s.

== Famous People, Members and Events ==
British golfer, Harry Vardon, played the Apawamis links on several occasions in the fall of 1900. Though he was successful in winning his matches against the club's pro Willie Davis, Vardon had the misfortune of being robbed on one of those visits while out on the course.

One of Apawamis' most famous players was Genevieve Hecker. She won the Women's National Golf Tournament back to back in 1901 at Baltusrol and in 1902 at Brookline. Hecker was acknowledged for skills on the links that surpassed those of many men. "Miss Hecker, as far as her iron play is concerned, has no superior in this country among women and few men can compete with her in this part of the same. She is thoroughly worthy of the title of champion."

Golf great Gene Sarazen and entertainer Ed Sullivan were both caddies at Apawamis.

On January 6, 1945, after being married at the First Presbyterian Church in Rye, New York, future U.S. President George H. W. Bush and his wife Barbara held their wedding reception at the Club.

In 1965 as part of the club's 75th Anniversary, Gene Sarazen and Francis Ouimet, the "Father of Amateur Golf" teamed up for an exhibition match at the club.

Wildlife photographer Bayard W. Read and his wife Edith were members. Edith Gwynne Read was a noted conservationist who protected Rye wetlands and watercourses from the negative impacts of overdevelopment and whose legacy is embodied in the Edith Read Sanctuary, Rye, New York. Bayard, a financier and graduate of Princeton, was president of Apawamis in 1940 at the time of the club's 50th anniversary.

Other famous members might include Andrew Carnegie.

== Notes ==
^{†} Former Apawamis Club head professional Herbert Strong, who in 1912 was playing out of Inwood Country Club, placed third in this event.
