= Francis Casement =

Rugby union player from Northern Ireland

Major-General Francis Casement DSO*
- Born: 29 October 1881; Dublin, Ireland
- Died: 14 August 1967 (aged 85); Ballycastle, County Antrim, Northern Ireland
- Notable relative: Mabel Harrison (wife)

Rugby union career
- Position: Centre
International career
Years	Team	Apps	(Points)
1906	Ireland	3	(0)

Major-General Francis Casement (29 October 1881 – 14 August 1967) was a British Army officer and an Irish international rugby union player.

Born in Dublin, Casement grew up in County Antrim and attended Coleraine Academical Institution, before returning to Dublin for studies at Trinity College. He played rugby for Dublin University and gained three Ireland caps as a centre three-quarter in the 1906 Home Nations, which included a win over England at Leicester.

Casement served as a brevet lieutenant colonel on the Western Front and in Gallipoli with the Royal Army Medical Corps during World War I. Mentioned three times in dispatches, Casement was decorated with the Legion of Honour, Distinguished Service Order (and bar) and the Order of St John.

After the war, Casement spent time in Mauritius as the island's principal medical officer and on his return home served as a director with Army Medical Services. He was promoted to major general in April 1938, when he relinquished the assignment of deputy director general, Army Medical Services. He was named honorary surgeon to King George VI shortly before retiring to Ballycastle and in 1951 became the High Sheriff of Antrim.

== See also ==
- List of Ireland national rugby union players
