= Mabel Harrison =

Irish golfer (1886–1972)

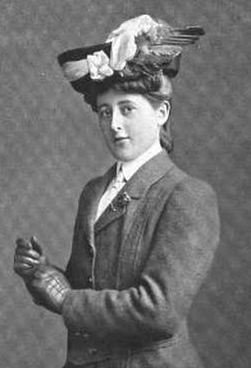
- Mabel Harrison, from a 1907 publication.
- Born: Frances Mabel Harrison; 1886; Dublin, Ireland
- Died: 22 April 1972 (aged 85–86); Ballymoney, Ireland
- Other names: Mary Harrison (in some news reports); Mabel Casement (after marriage in 1916)
- Occupation: golfer
- Known for: Irish Ladies' Close Championship, 1910, 1911, 1912

Mabel Harrison (1886 – 22 April 1972) was an Irish golfer, winner of the Irish Ladies' Close Championship in 1910, 1911, and 1912. (Some news reports referred to her, in error, as Mary Harrison.)

== Early life ==
Frances Mabel Harrison was born in Dublin, the daughter of Robert Francis Harrison and Agnes Blanche Bagwell. Her parents married at St George's Church, Dublin. Her father was a prominent barrister in Dublin; her grandfather Michael Harrison was a judge.

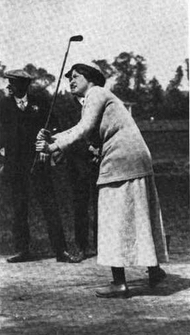
Mabel Harrison in action, from a 1918 publication.

== Career ==
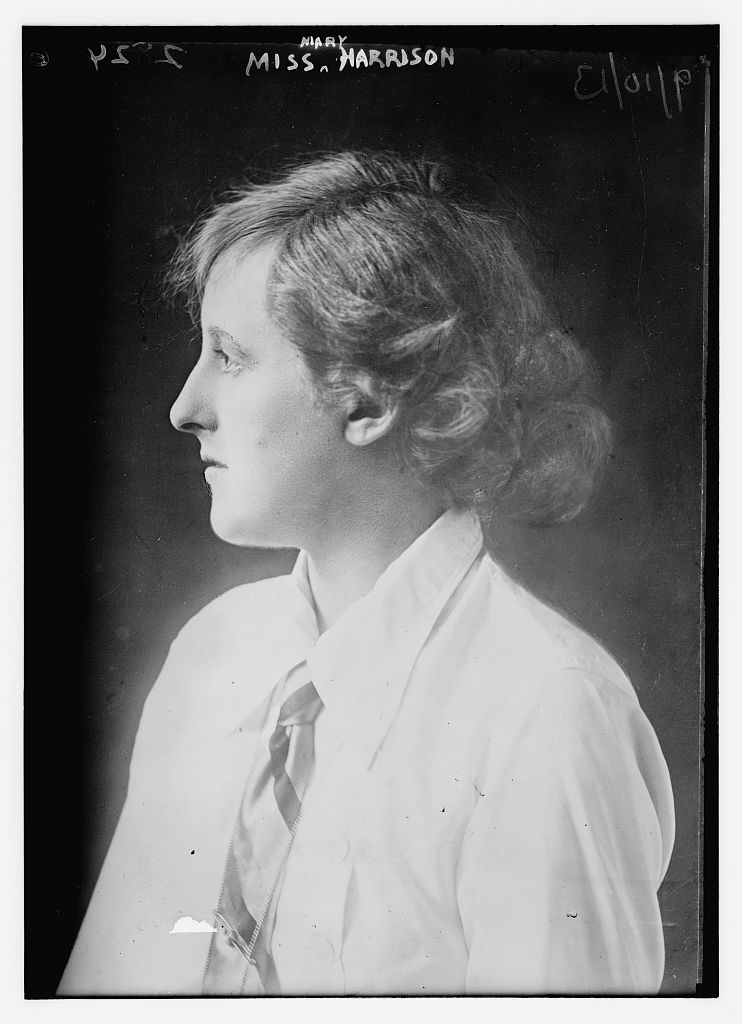
Mabel Harrison (here labelled Miss Mary Harrison), from the George Grantham Bain Collection, Library of Congress.

Mabel Harrison is counted alongside May Hezlet and Rhona Adair as a pioneer of Irish women's golf. She began playing golf in competition when she was still a teenager. She joined the Malahide Island Club as golfer in 1905, and is remembered as one of the club's "most famous members". She was also a member of the Hermitage and Royal Portrush clubs. In April 1906, she finished in the final eight of the Irish Ladies' Close Championship in Newcastle. "She is a long driver and a powerful iron player, and with a little practice will easily take her place among the scratch players" noted a commentator in 1907. She had "an admirable overlapping finger grip", so much that a close-up photo of her hands on the club were included and analysed in articles about women golfers. She played for Ireland at international matches in Birkdale in 1909, and at Turnberry in 1912.

Harrison won the Irish Ladies' Close Championship at the Malahide Island Club in 1911. She won the Irish Ladies' Close Championship for three years, 1910, 1911, and 1912. In October 1913 she travelled to North America, to play in the 1913 United States Women's Amateur Golf Championship in Wilmington, Delaware (she lost to Gladys Ravenscroft). She also played and the Canadian ladies' open in Montreal in 1913. She was still competing as a golfer in 1919, as "Mrs. Frank Casement". During World War I she was also active with the Soldiers' and Sailors' Families relief in Dublin.

== Personal life and legacy ==
Mabel Harrison married in 1916, to an Irish military doctor who served in World War I, Francis Casement. They had a son, Francis Charles Casement (1920-1976), and a daughter, Alison Sheila Casement (1923-2015). She was widowed when Francis Casement died in 1967; she died in Ballymoney in 1972.

There is an annual Mabel Harrison Scratch Cup event, named in her memory, held by the Royal Portrush Golf Club.
