= Silas H. Strawn =

American lawyer

Silas Strawn
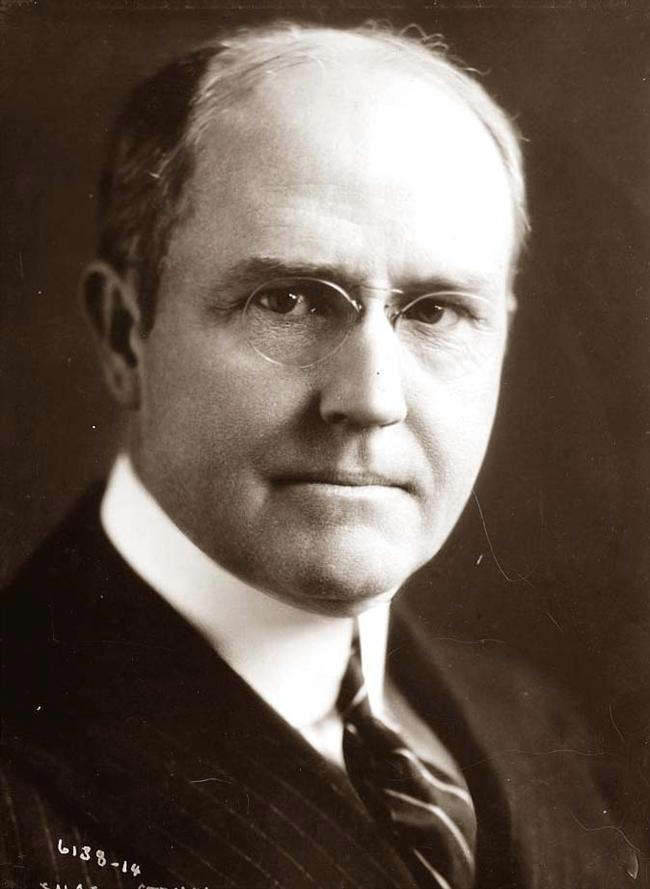

Personal details
- Born: Silas Hardy Strawn; December 15, 1866 near Ottawa, Illinois, U.S.
- Died: February 4, 1946 (aged 79); Palm Beach, Florida, U.S.
- Resting place: Lake Forest Cemetery
- Political party: Republican

Silas Hardy Strawn (December 15, 1866 – February 4, 1946) was a prominent Chicago lawyer and one of the name partners at the law firm of Winston & Strawn. He was also the president of the United States Chamber of Commerce during the early years of the Great Depression, in which capacity he supported the policies of Herbert Hoover and was a noted opponent of Franklin D. Roosevelt's New Deal.

== Biography ==
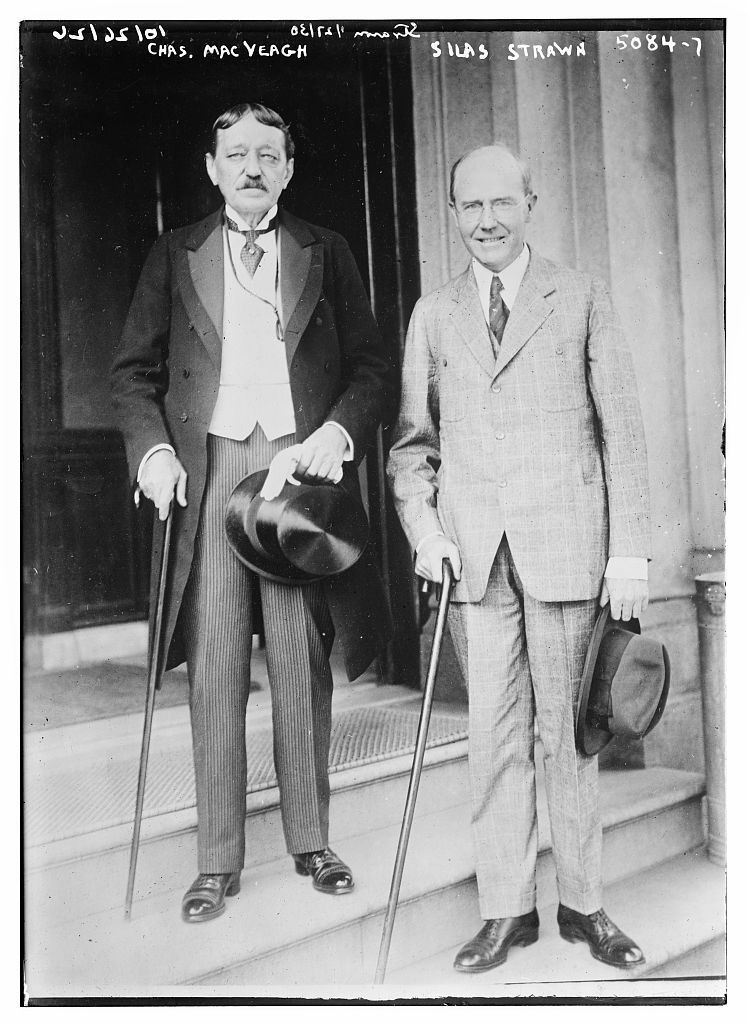
Strawn (right) and Charles MacVeagh (left), 1925

Strawn was born on December 15, 1866, on the family farm near Ottawa, Illinois. He graduated from Ottawa High School in 1885 and spent the next two years as a teacher. In 1887, he studied law in the Ottawa law firm Bull & Strawn. He was admitted to the bar of Illinois in May 1889. He established his own law practice in LaSalle County, Illinois.

Strawn relocated to Chicago, Illinois in September 1891, taking a position with Weigley, Buckley & Gray. In 1892, he joined Winston & Meagher and became a partner at the firm on September 1, 1894.

On June 22, 1897, he married Margaret Stewart of Binghamton, New York; their marriage would produce two daughters, Margaret and Katherine Stewart.

In 1902, Meagher retired and the firm was renamed Winston, Strawn & Shaw. (It would later be known as Winston, Payne & Strawn; then as Winston, Payne, Strawn & Shaw; until finally becoming simply Winston & Strawn.) Strawn would ultimately practice law with the firm for 52 years, serving as managing partner for 40 years.

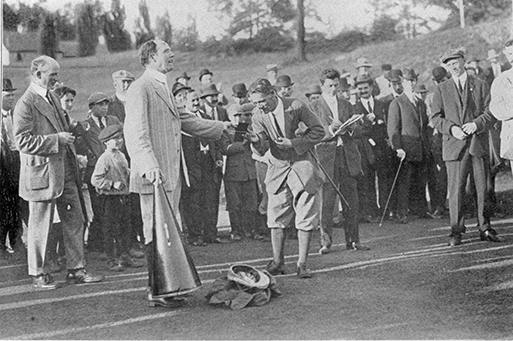
As president of the United States Golf Association, Strawn presents the 1911 United States Amateur Championship to Harold Hilton at Apawamis Golf Club.

A member of both the prestigious Glen View Club and Chicago Golf Clubs, Strawn served as president of the United States Golf Association from 1911-1912.

In 1913, Strawn was elected president of the Chicago Bar Association, and upon the outbreak of World War I, arranged for members of the association to take over without charge cases left unfinished by lawyers who volunteered to serve in the army. Strawn served as president of the Illinois State Bar Association, 1921-22.

U.S. President Calvin Coolidge named Strawn as one of two American delegates to the Special Conference on American Relations with China, held in Beijing on October 26, 1925. Strawn was also chairman of the Chinese Extraterritoriality Commission.

In 1927, Strawn was elected president of the American Bar Association. During his time as president, he pushed for higher standards in legal education, including college study before admission to law school and a full three years of legal training before being eligible for admission to the bar.

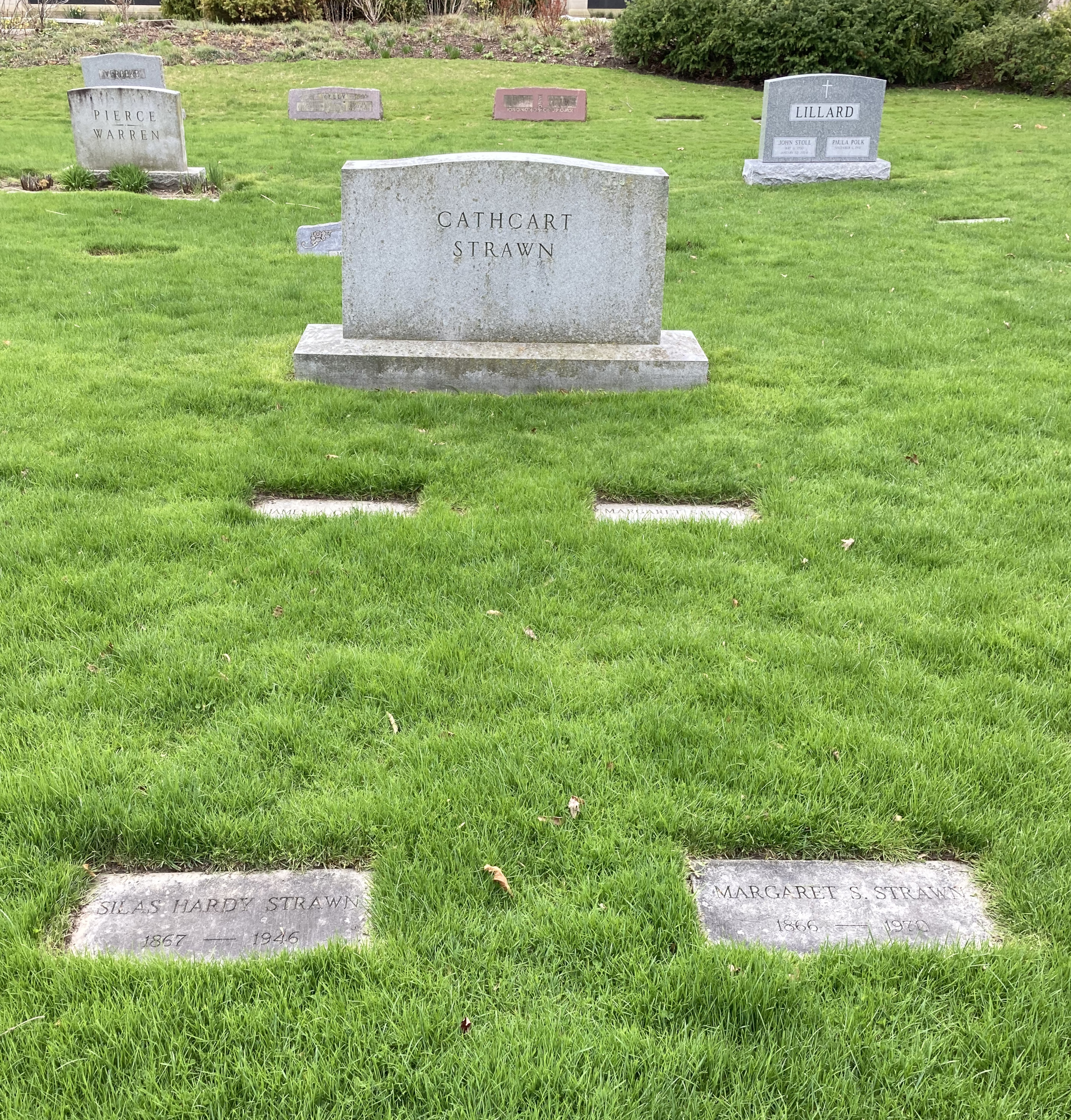
Strawn's grave at Lake Forest Cemetery

As president of the United States Chamber of Commerce, in 1931, Strawn spoke out in favor of President Herbert Hoover's response to the Great Depression, arguing that it was up to business, not government, to solve the world's economic problems. He also strenuously opposed the extension of unemployment benefits to the unemployed. "If this country ever votes the dole," Strawn said, "we’ve hit the toboggan as a nation." Strawn spoke out loudly against the Securities Act of 1933 and the Securities Exchange Act of 1934, stating in Congressional testimony: "I believe there is an abundant market for securities, if the Securities Act did not prevent their issue and distribution." He also opposed the introduction of social security, arguing that it was one of many "attempts to Sovietize America."

In 1934, as former president of the chamber, and a leader of its conservative wing, Strawn called on Roosevelt to "stop experimenting", stop encouraging Congress to pass "hysterical legislation", and return to a policy of balanced budgets. Soon, however, Roosevelt had convinced the Chamber of Commerce to participate in his recovery effort and Strawn was appointed head of the Chambermen's efforts.

Strawn was chairman of the Board of Directors of Montgomery Ward for a number of years. He also served as a trustee of Northwestern University from 1930 to his death in 1946.

He was buried at Lake Forest Cemetery in Illinois.
