= Henry Jackson (rugby union) =

Irish rugby union player

- Full name: Henry William Jackson
- Born: 3 November 1853 Clones, County Monaghan, Ireland
- Died: 28 December 1930 (aged 77) Dublin, Ireland

Rugby union career
- Position: Forward
International career
Years	Team	Apps	(Points)
1877	Ireland	1	(0)

Henry William Jackson (3 November 1853 — 28 December 1930) was an Irish international rugby union player.

Born in Clones, County Monaghan, Jackson was educated at Foyle College in Derry and Trinity College Dublin. He played rugby during his youth and in 1877 was capped for Ireland as a forward against England at The Oval. Called to the bar in 1879, Jackson had a practice at the North East-Bar and became a QC in 1900. He was a Master of the King's Bench.

Jackson married the daughter of barrister William Lane-Joynt, a former Lord Mayor of Dublin He was the father of the six-time Irish amateur golf champion Janet Jackson and had a son Cyril who led Ireland in the 1931 Davis Cup.

== See also ==
- List of Ireland national rugby union players
