= Genevieve Hecker =

American golfer (1883–1960)

- Hecker, c. 1906

Personal information
- Nationality: United States
- Born: November 19, 1883 Darien, Connecticut, U.S.
- Died: July 29, 1960 (aged 76) Brooklyn, New York, U.S.
- Spouse: Charles T. Stout
- Children: 1

Career
- Sport: Golf
- Status: Amateur

Genevieve Hecker (November 19, 1883 – July 29, 1960) was an American amateur golfer. A member of The Apawamis Club, she won New York City's Metropolitan Golf Championship in 1900, 1901, 1905, and 1906.

== Early life ==
Hecker was born in Darien, Connecticut, on November 19, 1883, to John V. Hecker (1848–1924) and his wife Georgianna Hecker (née Bell) (1852–1929). Her father was in the flour milling business in New York City with the firm Hecker-Jones-Jewell Milling Company.

== Golf career ==
Hecker picked up golf at one of the oldest clubs in Connecticut, the Wee Burn Golf Club located in Noroton. She was so successful that she eventually became Captain of the team. Her brother George and sister Louise played golf as well. The Heckers switched to Apawamis in 1901 following that club's installation of a new course. Hecker went on to win the Women's National Golf Tournament in 1901 and 1902. The 1901 U.S. Women's Amateur was held at the Baltusrol Golf Club in Springfield Township, Union County, New Jersey, from October 8–12, 1901. She also tied with Margaret Curtis and two others for the championship's lowest qualifying score. In 1902 she would win the U.S. Amateur again at The Country Club course in Brookline, Massachusetts.

Hecker's instructor at golf was the noted Scottish-American professional George Strath. She was equally at ease playing against men as well as women. Hecker led the women's team against the men in a notable match at The Apawamis Club in 1902. She was so accomplished that it was said where "her iron play is concerned she has no superior in this country among women and few men can compete with her in this part of the same. She is thoroughly worthy of the title of champion."

== Marriage and book writing ==
In April 1903, Hecker married Charles T. Stout, a fellow golfer at Apawamis. and in 1904 she published Golf for Women, the first book ever written exclusively for female golfers. The book included a chapter by Irish golfer Rhona Adair who won four straight Irish Ladies Close Championships and the 1900 and 1903 British Ladies Amateurs.

== Death ==
Hecker died on July 29, 1960, in Brooklyn, New York, and was interred there in Green-Wood Cemetery.
