= May Hezlet =

British golfer and sportswriter

- Hezlet, c. 1907

Personal information
- Full name: Mary Elizabeth Linzee Hezlet
- Nickname: May
- Nationality: Ireland; United Kingdom
- Born: 29 April 1882 Gibraltar
- Died: 27 December 1978 (aged 96) Sandwich, Kent, England

Career
- Sport: Golf
- Status: Amateur

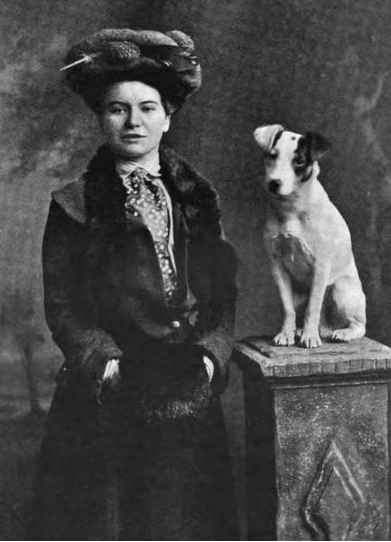
May Hezlet, from a 1907 publication.

Mary Elizabeth Linzee "May" Hezlet (29 April 1882 – 27 December 1978) was a British amateur golfer and sports writer. She has been called "probably Ireland's greatest woman golfer".

== Early life ==
Hezlet was born in Gibraltar, the daughter of Lieutenant-Colonel Richard Jackson Hezlet. She and her sisters Florence and Violet Hezlet grew up in Ireland and became leading golfers.

== Golf career ==
=== Irish Ladies Close Championship ===
In 1899, at the golf course in Newcastle, County Down, May Hezlet defeated Rhona Adair to win the first of her five Irish Ladies' Close Championships, three of which came in succession from 1904 to 1906. In two of those victories her sister Florence was the runner-up. It was Janet Jackson who surpassed her record of five championships, by winning six between 1913 and 1925.

=== British Ladies Amateur ===
She won the British Ladies Amateur title in 1899, becoming the youngest-ever winner of the championship—an age record that still stands. Hezlet won the British Ladies Amateur again in 1902 then in 1904 at Scotland's Royal Troon Golf Club she lost in the final to Lottie Dod. She won her third British title in 1907 and her fifth Irish Ladies' Close Championship in 1908 at the Royal Portrush Golf Club.

=== Writer of golf books ===
Hezlet published a book titled Ladies Golf in 1904 that was immensely popular. A second edition was published 1907 with an additional updating chapter. In 1912, she contributed to The New Book of Golf by Horace G. Hutchinson.

== Family ==
In 1909, she married Rev. Arthur Edwin Ross. Her brother Charles Hezlet was runner-up in The Amateur Championship in 1914, played in the Walker Cup, and won several Irish amateur titles.

== Death and legacy ==
Hezlet died on 27 December 1978 at Sandwich, Kent, England. In 1999 the Irish Times noted that May Hazlet was probably Ireland's greatest woman golfer.
