= Edith Cuthell =

English author (1888–1923)

- Born: 1853
- Died: 1929 (aged 75–76)
- Occupations: Short-story writer, biographer
- Spouses: Thomas George Cuthell

Edith Cuthell (1853–1929) was an English author. She wrote short stories about her life in India, as well as a biography of Marie Louise, Duchess of Parma.
