= Blainroe Golf Club =

- Location within Ireland
- 52.9447°N 6.0205°W

Club information
- Location: County Wicklow, Ireland
- Established: 1978
- Type: Private
- Tota holes: 18
- Tournaments: Irish Seniors Close 2010
- Website: Blainroe Golf Club

Blainroe
- Designed by: Fred Hawtree
- Par: 72
- Length: 6,175 Metres

Blainroe Golf Club is a golf course situated about 3.5 km south of Wicklow Town in County Wicklow, Ireland. The course was originally built as part of a village resort in Blainroe by Dublin builder Christy Cooney.

As of 2020, Blainroe is ranked 95th in the Irish Golf Digest's Top 100 Courses in Ireland.
