= Royal Curragh Golf Club =

Golf club in County Kildare, Ireland

- Location within Ireland
- 53.1470°N 6.8132°W

Club information
- Location: County Kildare, Ireland
- Established: 1858 168 years ago

The Royal Curragh Golf Club is a private members' club with an 18-hole golf course in County Kildare, Ireland. Dating from 1858, it is the oldest golf club in Ireland. Located next to Curragh Camp, its course has historically had strong links to the military.

== History ==
=== Foundation ===
The golf club was founded in 1858, with the then Lord Lieutenant of Ireland, Archibald Montgomerie, 13th Earl of Eglinton, reputedly being a "frequent visitor to the course".

=== Royal title ===
On 21 September 1910, the Curragh Golf Club was granted a royal charter and was renamed the Royal Curragh Golf Club. After the Irish Free State was granted independence in 1922, however, the club reverted to the name Curragh Golf Club. In 1981, William Gibson, Commandant of the Club, received confirmation from the Home Office in Westminster that the royal title had never been withdrawn. In May 2011, the state visit by Elizabeth II to the Republic of Ireland, the first royal visit since that of George V in 1911, was seen as popular and marked a new relationship between Britain and Ireland. In 2013, the club voted to restore the 'royal' prefix, and its name reverted to the Royal Curragh Golf Club.

== Course ==
The present course opened in 2007 and was designed by Patrick Merrigan. It has a length of 6586 yards and a par of 72. The course is built on The Curragh plain.

== See also ==
- List of golf clubs granted Royal status
