= Portmarnock Professional Tournament =

Tournament information
- Location: Portmarnock, Ireland
- Established: 1910
- Course(s): Portmarnock Golf Club
- Month played: July
- Final year: 1910

Final champion
- James Sherlock

Location in Ireland

The Portmarnock Professional Tournament was a golf tournament played in Portmarnock, Ireland. The event was held just once, in 1910, and had total prize money of £250, provided by the Portmarnock club. The tournament was won by James Sherlock who beat Harry Vardon 2&1 in the 36-hole final. The prize money was reported to be the largest amount ever for a professional tournament promoted by a golf club.

== History ==
The tournament was played over four days, from 6–9 July. The first day was a 36-hole stroke play contest with the leading 32 players qualifying for a knock-out contest on the remaining three days. The match play games were over 18 holes, except the final which was 36 holes. Most of the leading golfers played with the exception of James Braid, J.H. Taylor and Arnaud Massy. There were 84 entries but a number did not turn up and there were eventually about 70 competitors.

Ted Ray led the qualifying contest with a score of 154, three strokes ahead of the rest, and won a £10 prize. Five players tied on 170 for last two places.

The second morning started with a 9-hole playoff for the final two places in the knockout stage. One of the surprises of the day was the victory of Michael Moran over Ted Ray in the last-16 round.

Moran, the last Irishman, lost in the quarter-final to George Duncan.

The 36-hole final resulted in a 2&1 win for James Sherlock. The win was mainly due to some excellent putting by Sherlock. The morning round ended all square and still level after 13 holes of the afternoon round. Sherlock then holed a chip at the 14th and won the 15th to go 2 up. Halves at the 16th and 17th gave him the victory.

== Winners ==
Year	Winner	Country	Venue	Margin of victory	Runner-up	Winner's share (£)	Ref
1910	James Sherlock	England	Portmarnock Golf Club	2&1	(Jersey) Harry Vardon	50	
