= Rhona Adair =

Irish golfer

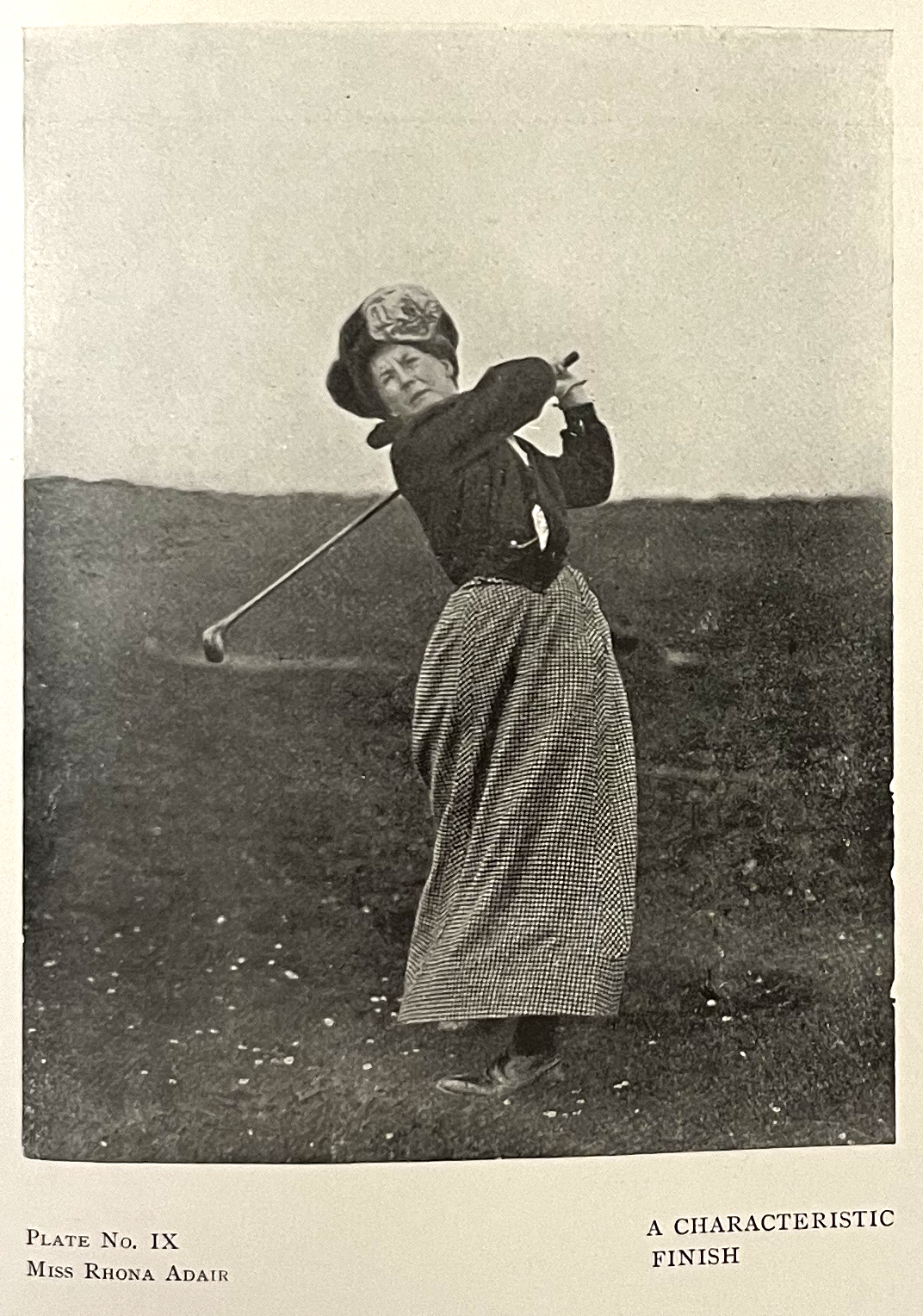
- Born: 2 September 1881; Cookstown, Ireland
- Died: 27 March 1961 (aged 79); Coleraine, Northern Ireland
- Children: two
- Parent(s): Hugh and (Mary) Augusta Lee Adair (née Graves)

Rhona Kathleen Adair (2 September 1881 – 27 March 1961) was an Irish amateur golfer. She won the British Ladies Amateur twice and the Irish Ladies' Close Championships four times at the start of the twentieth century.

== Life ==
Adair was born in Cookstown, County Tyrone, Ireland. She was the daughter of keen golfers Hugh Adair and (Mary) Augusta Lee Adair (née Graves). Her father manufactured linen but he and her mother captained golf teams.

Along with May Hezlet, Adair is the most famous Irish golfer from the turn of the 20th century. She was 17 years of age when she played in her first British Ladies Amateur in 1895. In 1899 she nearly beat the 77 year old "Old Tom Morris" who had designed the St Andrews Links where they were playing. Morris was quoted as having said "I'll no' be licked by a lassie", but only won on the final green. Adair went on to win the British Ladies Amateur in 1900 and again in 1903. She also won four straight Irish Ladies' Close Championships from 1900 to 1903.

She played several golfing exhibition matches on a 1903 tour of the United States. While there she befriended Genevieve Hecker, the two-time U.S. Women's Amateur champion. Hecker asked her to contribute a chapter on British golf for her book published in 1904 titled Golf for Women, the first book written for female golfers. Adair defeated leading American golfer Margaret Curtis during a tournament at Merion, Philadelphia and this led the Illustrated Sporting News to say that she was "the foremost lady golfer in the world".

In October 1906, Adair married Algernon Cuthell, an army Captain from West Yorkshire and gave up her career in competitive golf to raise two children in Aldershot. Cuthell was killed in action in the Dardanelles during World War I. After he died she returned to Ireland where she remained supportive of women's golf and rose to be president of the Irish Ladies Golf Union; she was president in 1961 when she died at Portrush in County Antrim.
