= Golf Ireland =

Sports governing body in Ireland

- Aontas Gailf na hÉireann
- Sport: Amateur golf
- Founded: 2021
- Affiliation: International Golf Federation
- Regional affiliation: European Golf Association
- Location: Carton House, Maynooth
- Replaced: Golfing Union of Ireland (1891); Irish Ladies Golf Union (1893)

Golf Ireland is the governing body for golf across the island of Ireland. Formed in 2021, it replaced the Golfing Union of Ireland as the governing body for men's and boy's amateur golf, and the Irish Ladies Golf Union which oversaw women's competitions.

Originally established in 1891, the Golfing Union of Ireland was the first national golfing union to be formed anywhere in the world, and operated separately from the (female) Irish Ladies Golf Union (ILGU) which was founded shortly afterwards in 1893. In 2018, the two "oldest governing bodies in world golf" agreed to amalgamate to form a new joint governing organisation, with this successor body, Golf Ireland, initially operating in a transitional capacity. The GUI ceased operations once Golf Ireland became fully operational on 1 January 2021, and Golf Ireland held its first general meeting in February 2021.

== History ==
=== Origins ===
It is suggested that the origins of the Golfing Union of Ireland (GUI) were based in the desire by a number of golf clubs to create an Irish championship. There were 28 clubs already established in Ireland before the foundation of the Union, although they were known as 'greens' at that time. The organisation was established at a meeting in Belfast on 13 November 1891, which was attended by representatives of nine clubs, all of which were located in Ulster. The founding clubs were The County Down, The County Club at Portrush, Royal Belfast, Killymoon, Dungannon, Aughnacloy, Ballycastle, Portsalon and North West Golf Club, Lisfannon.

=== Handicapping system ===
The GUI introduced a handicapping system in 1897 and this was thought to be the most far-reaching advance in the promotion of the game. At that time, individual clubs implemented their own systems, based on the scores of their most consistent player; using him as a back-marker and allocating other players shots accordingly. The GUI adopted a similar approach in developing the first universal handicapping system, and used one Thomas Gilroy as the back-marker. Gilroy was born in Dundee in 1852 and was played at Carnoustie Golf Club at the age of seven. He was educated at St. Andrews where he received tuition from both Old and Young Tom Morris. He moved to Ireland in 1885 and was by far the most consistent player there over the next ten years, holding the course record for a number of the courses in existence in the country at that time.

The new handicapping system set out the range of handicaps in 10 classes from plus to 30 and laid down specific allowances for matchplay, whereby the weaker player would not be disadvantaged by the stronger. It also introduced the concept of using yardage measurements to establish the par score of a hole or course. This is the first time that the word par appears in golf, defined as the number of strokes in which a hole or round can be taken without mistakes.

=== Growth ===
The original charter of the GUI prescribed that each affiliated club was entitled to send forward up to three delegates to every meeting. By 1911, 163 clubs had become affiliated to the organisation and this became impractical. It became necessary to draw up a new constitution which provided for the establishment of a 'central council' and four provincial councils. This new constitution was ratified in April 1913.

As of 2008, the four main officers of the GUI were the president, honorary secretary, honorary treasurer and the president elect. These four, along with two representatives from each of the provincial branches and the immediate past president, made up the 13-member executive committee.

As of 2018, the GUI represented 430 golf clubs and had 170,000 members.

=== Amalgamation ===
The Golfing Union of Ireland (or GUI; the men's association founded in 1891) and Irish Ladies Golf Union (or ILGU; the ladies' association founded in 1893) operated as separate organisations for over 120 years. Following a consultation process which commenced in 2015, and after separate votes by representatives of both the GUI and ILGU, the two "oldest governing bodies in world golf" agreed to form a new joint governing organisation for golf in Ireland. The new combined body, "Golf Ireland", commenced in 2020, and held its first general meeting (and ratified its first board and association president) in February 2021. As of mid-2021, the Golf Ireland website stated that it is "the single governing body for golf in Ireland. Established in 2020 it continues on from the Golfing Union of Ireland (GUI) and the Irish Ladies Golf Union (ILGU)" and that it was "established to replace its two predecessors, the GUI and the ILGU" and to reflect their heritage in its documentation.
