= List of American Walker Cup golfers =

This is a list of all the American golfers who have played in the Walker Cup through 2025. Jay Sigel holds the record with nine appearances.

== Players ==
Player	Editions
Tommy Aaron	1959
Buddy Alexander	1987
Don Allen	1965, 1967
Billy Andrade	1987
Gene Andrews	1961
John Augenstein	2019
Doug Ballenger	1973
Blayne Barber	2011
Rex Baxter	1957
Notah Begay III	1995
Deane Beman	1959, 1961, 1963, 1965
David Berganio Jr.	1993
Akshay Bhatia	2019
Ray Billows	1938, 1949
Ted Bishop	1947, 1949
Arnold Blum	1957
John Bohmann	1969
Mike Brannan	1977
Alan Bratton	1995
George Burns	1975
Clark Burroughs	1985
Jonathan Byrd	1999
Albert Campbell	1936
Joe Campbell	1957
William C. Campbell	1951, 1953, 1955^, 1957, 1965, 1967, 1971, 1975
Patrick Cantlay	2011
Nick Cassini	2001
Ricky Castillo	2021
Bud Cauley	2009
Ron Cerrudo	1967
Cameron Champ	2017
Dick Chapman	1947, 1951, 1953
Don Cherry	1953, 1955, 1961
Doug Clarke	1979
Bob Cochran	1961
Charles Coe	1949, 1951, 1953, 1959, 1961, 1963
Ron Commans	1981
Erik Compton	2001
Joe Conrad	1955
Pierceson Coody	2021
Jerry Courville Jr.	1995, 1997
Kris Cox	1995
Nathaniel Crosby	1983
Bruce Cudd	1955
Quade Cummins	2021
Richard Davies	1963
Johnny Dawson	1949
Bryson DeChambeau	2015
Duke Delcher	1997
Todd Demsey	1993
Bob Dickson	1967
Allen Doyle	1989+, 1991, 1993
James Driscoll	2001
George Dunlap	1932, 1934, 1936
Nick Dunlap	2023
David Duval	1991
Austin Eckroat	2021
Danny Edwards	1973
Chandler Egan	1934
David Eger	1989, 1991, 2001
Dave Eichelberger	1965
Brad Elder	1997
Jimmy Ellis	1973
Walter Emery	1936
Harris English	2011
Chick Evans	1922, 1924, 1928
Matt Every	2005
John Farquhar	1971
Brad Faxon	1983
Rick Fehr	1983
Johnny Fischer	1934, 1936, 1938
Doug Fischesser	1979
Steven Fisk	2019
Marty Fleckman	1967
Bruce Fleisher	1969
David Ford	2023
John Fought	1977
Rickie Fowler	2007, 2009
William C. Fownes Jr.	1922, 1924
Frank Fuhrer III	1981
Nick Gabrelcik	2023
Jim Gabrielsen	1971
Robert Gamez	1989
Robert Gardner	1922, 1923, 1924, 1926
Robert W. Gardner	1961, 1963
Brian Gay	1993
Doug Ghim	2017
Brendan Gielow	2009
Vinny Giles	1969, 1971, 1973, 1975
Harry Givan	1936
Lucas Glover	2001
Johnny Goodman	1934, 1936, 1938
Jason Gore	1997
David Gossett	1999
Mike Gove	1979
John Grace	1975
Jimmy Grant	1967
Downing Gray	1963, 1965, 1967
Austin Greaser	2023
Danny Green	2001
Jesse Guilford	1922, 1924, 1926
Watts Gunn	1926, 1928
Bill Haas	2003
Fred Haas	1938
Hunter Haas	1999
Jay Haas	1975
Jerry Haas	1985
Stewart Hagestad	2017, 2019, 2021, 2023, 2025
Gary Hallberg	1977
George Hamer	1947^
Cole Hammer	2019, 2021
Brian Harman	2005, 2009
John Harris	1993, 1995, 1997, 2001
Labron Harris Jr.	1963
Scott Harvey	2015
Vance Heafner	1977
Matt Hendrix	2003
Russell Henley	2011
Davidson Herron	1923
Tim Herron	1993
Scott Hoch	1979
William Hoffer	1983
Morgan Hoffmann	2009
J. B. Holmes	2005
Jim Holtgrieve	1979, 1981, 1983
Max Homa	2013
John Mark Hopkins	1965
Billy Horschel	2007
Beau Hossler	2015
Ralph Howe	1989
Billy Howell	1932
Mason Howell	2025
Billy Hurley III	2005
Bill Hyndman	1957, 1959, 1961, 1969, 1971
Joe Inman	1969
Jimmy Jackson	1953, 1955
Tim Jackson	1995, 1999
Ben James	2023, 2025
Dustin Johnson	2007
Kevin Johnson	1989
Jimmy Johnston	1923, 1924, 1928, 1930, 1932^
Bobby Jones	1922, 1924, 1926, 1928, 1930
Fred Kammer	1947
Mike Killian	1973
Anthony Kim	2005
Michael Kim	2013
Chris Kirk	2007
Chris Kite	1987
Tom Kite	1971
Colt Knost	2007
Bobby Knowles	1951
Gary Koch	1973, 1975
Chuck Kocsis	1938, 1949, 1957
Jackson Koivun	2025
Kelly Kraft	2011
Joel Kribel	1997
Matt Kuchar	1999
Trip Kuehne	1995, 2003, 2007
Franklin Langham	1991
Michael La Sasso	2025
Randy Leen	1997
Justin Leonard	1993
Greg Lesher	1989
Bob Lewis	1981, 1983, 1985, 1987
Jack Lewis Jr.	1967
Lawson Little	1934
Gene Littler	1953
Edward Loar	1999
Bill Loeffler	1987
Davis Love III	1985
Jamie Lovemark	2007
Brock Mackenzie	2003
Roland MacKenzie	1926, 1928, 1930
Max Marston	1922, 1923, 1924, 1934
Doug Martin	1989
Buddy Marucci	1995, 1997
Len Mattiace	1987
Bob May	1991
Billy Mayfair	1987
Denny McCarthy	2015
Maurice McCarthy	1932
Bruce McCormick	1949
Lee McCoy	2015
Mike McCoy	2015
Jim McHale Jr.	1949, 1951
Tom McKnight	1999
Maverick McNealy	2015, 2017
Eric Meeks	1989
Mac Meissner	2021 (Note: He was an alternate but played because a number of players were ill.)
Steve Melnyk	1969, 1971
Dylan Menante	2023
Phil Mickelson	1989, 1991
Allen Miller	1969, 1971
Lindy Miller	1977
Spider Miller	1999
Adam Mitchell	2009
Kelly Mitchum	1993
Jacob Modleski	2025
Don Moe	1930, 1932
Bryce Molder	1999, 2001
Brian Montgomery	1987
Griff Moody	1979
Jonathan Moore	2007
Ryan Moore	2003
Gus Moreland	1932, 1934
Dale Morey	1955, 1965
Collin Morikawa	2017
Tommy Morrison	2025
William Mouw	2021
Jodie Mudd	1981
Bob Murphy	1967
Chris Nallen	2003
Jack Neville	1923
Jack Nicklaus	1959, 1961
Jordan Niebrugge	2013, 2015
Andy Ogletree	2019
Francis Ouimet	1922, 1923, 1924, 1926, 1928, 1930, 1932, 1934, 1936^
Jeff Overton	2005
Harold Paddock Jr.	1951
John Pak	2019, 2021
Jerry Pate	1975
Billy Joe Patton	1955, 1957, 1959, 1963, 1965
Corey Pavin	1981
Mike Peck	1979
Mark Pfeil	1973
Mike Podolak	1985
Michael Putnam	2005
Smiley Quick	1947
Jeff Quinney	2001
Sam Randolph	1985
Joey Rassett	1981
Doc Redman	2017
Kyle Reifers	2005
Fred Ridley	1977
Skee Riegel	1947, 1949
Chris Riley	1995
Hillman Robbins	1957
Patrick Rodgers	2011, 2013
Bill Rogers	1973
George Rotan	1923
Adam Rubinson	2003
Mason Rudolph	1957
Isaiah Salinda	2019
Bill Sander	1977
Gordon Sargent	2023
Scottie Scheffler	2017
Tom Scherrer	1991
Steve Scott	1997, 1999
Charles Seaver	1932
Robby Shelton	2015
Dick Siderowf	1969, 1973, 1975, 1977
Jay Sigel	1977, 1979, 1981, 1983, 1985, 1987, 1989, 1991, 1993
R. H. Sikes	1963
Jim Simons	1971
Scott Simpson	1977
Webb Simpson	2007
Alex Smalley	2019
Charlie Smith	1961, 1963
Nathan Smith	2009, 2011, 2013
Reynolds Smith	1936, 1938
Randy Sonnier	1985
Jim Sorenson	1987
Jordan Spieth	2011
Mike Sposa	1991
Craig Stadler	1975
Kyle Stanley	2007
Hunter Stewart	2015
Preston Stout	2025
Tyler Strafaci	2021
Frank Stranahan	1947, 1949, 1951
Curtis Strange	1975
Preston Summerhays	2023
Jase Summy	2025
Caleb Surratt	2023
Hal Sutton	1979, 1981
Jess Sweetser	1922, 1923, 1924, 1926, 1928, 1930+, 1932
Bud Taylor	1957, 1959, 1961
David Tentis	1983
Justin Thomas	2013
Davis Thompson	2021
Nicholas Thompson	2005
Braden Thornberry	2017
D. J. Trahan	2001
Cameron Tringale	2009
Willie Turnesa	1947, 1949, 1951
Billy Tuten	1983
Ed Tutwiler	1965, 1967
Peter Uihlein	2009, 2011
Ed Updegraff	1963, 1965, 1969
Sam Urzetta	1951, 1953
Ken Venturi	1953
Scott Verplank	1985
Mitch Voges	1991
George Voigt	1930, 1932, 1936
George Von Elm	1926, 1928, 1930
Dick von Tacky	1981
Lanny Wadkins	1969, 1971
Duffy Waldorf	1985
Bud Ward	1938, 1947
Harvie Ward	1953, 1955, 1959
Drew Weaver	2009
Michael Weaver	2013
Marty West	1973, 1979
Jack Westland	1932, 1934, 1953
Ward Wettlaufer	1959
Ed White	1936
Todd White	2013
Cory Whitsett	2013
Chris Williams	2011
Lee Williams	2003, 2005
Oscar Willing	1923, 1924, 1930
Casey Wittenberg	2003
Chris Wollmann	1997
Willie Wood	1983
Tiger Woods	1995
Fred Wright	1923
Brandon Wu	2019
Bobby Wyatt	2013
Norman Xiong	2017
Charlie Yates	1936, 1938
Danny Yates	1989, 1993
Dick Yost	1955
George Zahringer	2003
Will Zalatoris	2017

^ In the final team but did not play in any matches.
+ Selected for the team but withdrew and was replaced. Allen Doyle was selected but withdrew shortly before the event because of injury.

== Ryder Cup players ==
The following 37 American Walker Cup players have subsequently played in the Ryder Cup:

Tommy Aaron, Bryson DeChambeau, David Duval, Brad Faxon, Rickie Fowler, Fred Haas, Jay Haas, Scott Hoch, J. B. Holmes, Dustin Johnson, Anthony Kim, Tom Kite, Matt Kuchar, Justin Leonard, Gene Littler, Davis Love III, Phil Mickelson, Ryan Moore, Bob Murphy, Jack Nicklaus, Jeff Overton, Jerry Pate, Corey Pavin, Chris Riley, Bill Rogers, Mason Rudolph, Scott Simpson, Webb Simpson, Jordan Spieth, Craig Stadler, Curtis Strange, Hal Sutton, Justin Thomas, Ken Venturi, Scott Verplank, Lanny Wadkins, Tiger Woods.

== See also ==
- Golf in the United States
- List of Great Britain and Ireland Walker Cup golfers
- Lists of golfers
