= Roland MacKenzie =

American golfer (1907–1988)

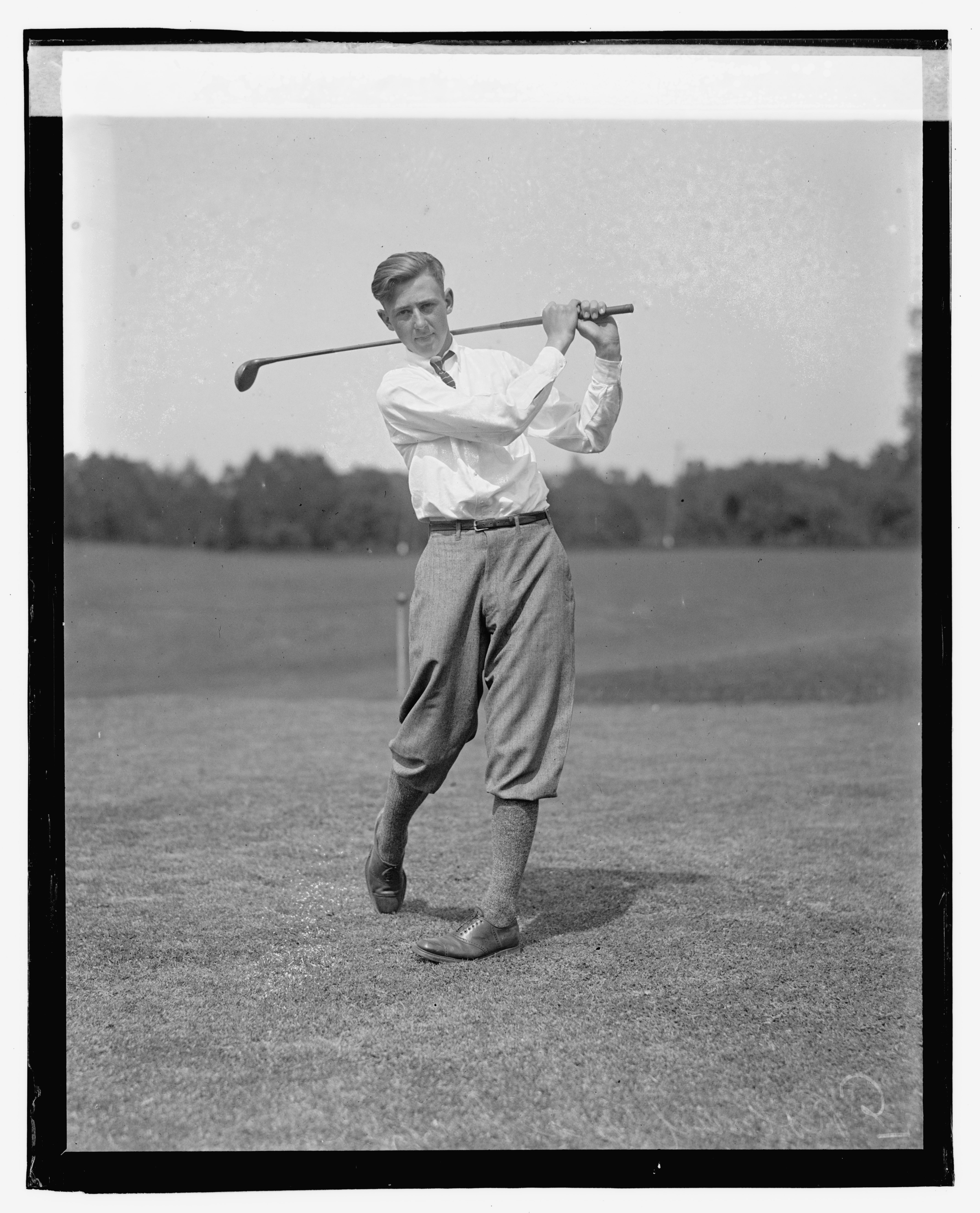
- MacKenzie in 1923

Personal information
- Full name: Roland Redus MacKenzie
- Nationality: United States
- Born: March 13, 1907 Washington, D.C., U.S.
- Died: November 19, 1988 (aged 81) Owings Mills, Maryland, U.S.

Career
- Sport: Golf
- Status: Amateur, briefly professional

Roland MacKenzie (March 13, 1907 – November 19, 1988) was an American amateur golfer whose career included three selections to Walker Cup teams and five times qualifying for the U.S. Amateur, earning him a reputation as one of America's finest golfers.

== Life and career ==
Born on March 13, 1907, in the District of Columbia, MacKenzie graduated from Western High School in Washington, D.C., and Brown University, Class of 1929, in Providence, Rhode Island. He took up golf in 1921 at the age of 14, and by 1924 had won three invitational tourneys and qualified for the U.S. Amateur held at Merion Golf Club, in Ardmore, Pennsylvania. In the 1924 U.S. Amateur at Merion, his first national exposure, at age 17, he qualified for the 32-man match-play bracket, and drew George Von Elm as his partner.

In 1925, MacKenzie won the qualifying medal in the U.S. Amateur held at Oakmont Country Club in suburban Pittsburgh, Pennsylvania, with a course-record 71 and 74 for 145, two ahead of Bobby Jones and Jesse Guilford.

In 1926, at age 19, while just a freshman at Brown, he was named to the 1926 Walker Cup team with Jesse Guilford, Francis Ouimet, Watts Gunn, Jess Sweetser, Bobby Jones, George Von Elm, and Robert Gardner in the competition held at the Old Course at St Andrews in Scotland. In a preliminary round, MacKenzie defeated one of the most skillful putters in Scotland, William John Guild, 3 and 2, eliciting praise from the press:

"The Walker team men tonight are congratulating their youngest colleague. From the first tee, he sent thunderous shots straight down the fairways. His ball led Guild's 40 to 50 yards through the match. MacKenzie's play, particularly his style and grace, which the spectators repeatedly compared to that of Bobby Jones, and his powerful low drives, frequently evoked applause."

His record as the youngest player selected for Walker Cup play stood for 5 decades.

MacKenzie's best showing in the U.S. Amateur was in 1927, advancing to the semi-finals before losing to Chick Evans in a 37-hole battle.

In 1928, he was again named to the Walker Cup team for the match held at the Chicago Golf Club in Wheaton, Illinois, with Charles Evans Jr., Francis Ouimet, Watts Gunn, Jess Sweetser, Jimmy Johnston, and George Von Elm. His last appearance on the Walker Cup team was in the 1930 match, held at the Royal St George's Golf Club in Sandwich, Kent, with Jimmy Johnston, George J. Voigt, George Von Elm, Donald K. Moe, Oscar Willing, and Francis Ouimet. In his three years on the Walker Cup team, MacKenzie compiled a 5–1 record.

In 1931, he went to California and worked as an assistant movie director, counting Howard Hughes, Will Rogers, and Bing Crosby among his golfing friends. In the mid-1930s, he briefly turned professional and worked as golf pro at the Congressional Country Club in Bethesda, Maryland, the Broadmoor Golf Club in Colorado Springs, Colorado, and the Ponte Vedra Club in Florida.

Over the years, MacKenzie compiled a record that included Middle Atlantic Amateur titles 23 years apart (a tournament record), eight appearances in the U.S. Amateur between 1923 and 1948, membership on three Walker Cup teams, 1926, 1928 and 1930, and four Maryland State Golf Association father-and-son tournaments, playing with a son or a stepson. In 1965, he won the Maryland State Golf Association's seniors tournament.

At various times, he was the club champion at the Elkridge Club, the Baltimore Country Club and the Green Spring Valley Hunt Club. He was a member or past-member of the Gulf Stream Club in Delray Beach, Florida, the Country Club of North Carolina, and the Pinehurst Country Club. Two of his farm properties were developed as golf courses, "Oak Lea Farm" in Silver Spring, Maryland, as Argyle Country Club, and “Shamrock Farms” near Pinehurst, North Carolina, as Foxfire Resort & Country Club.

MacKenzie died on November 19, 1988, aged 81, at his home in Owings Mills, Maryland.

== Awards and honors ==
In 1975, MacKenzie was inducted into the Brown University Hall of Fame; further, in 1983, he was inducted into the Middle Atlantic Golf Association Hall of Fame.
