= Pacific Coast Amateur =

Annual amateur golf tournament

The Pacific Coast Amateur is an annual amateur golf tournament. It has been played since 1967 and is organized by the Pacific Coast Golf Association. It is held in various locations in the United States and Canada.

In December 2021, the Pacific Coast Amateur joined with six other tournaments to form the Elite Amateur Golf Series.

== Host locations ==
Location	Times hosted
California	20
Oregon	10
Washington	9
Arizona	5
British Columbia	5
Colorado	3
Hawaii	2
New Mexico	1
Utah	1

== Winners ==
- 2026 Jaden Dumdumaya
- 2025 Jaden Dumdumaya
- 2024 Chaz Aurilia
- 2023 Tyson Shelley
- 2022 James Leow
- 2021 Devon Bling
- 2020 Canceled
- 2019 Quade Cummins
- 2018 Isaiah Salinda
- 2017 Doug Ghim
- 2016 Will Zalatoris
- 2015 Aaron Wise
- 2014 Corey Pereira
- 2013 Tyler Raber
- 2012 David Fink
- 2011 Chris Williams
- 2010 Andrew Putnam
- 2009 Chan Kim
- 2008 Jordan Irwin
- 2007 Mike Knight
- 2006 Patrick Nagle
- 2005 Alex Prugh
- 2004 Michael Putnam
- 2003 James Lepp
- 2002 Brock Mackenzie
- 2001 Corey Prugh
- 2000 Billy Harvey
- 1999 Ryan LaVoie
- 1998 Ben Crane
- 1997 Jason Gore
- 1996 Scott Johnson
- 1995 Birk Nelson
- 1994 Mark Johnson
- 1993 Todd Demsey
- 1992 Todd Fischer
- 1991 David Berganio Jr.
- 1990 Terrence Miskell
- 1989 Randy Sonnier
- 1988 Billy Mayfair
- 1987 Billy Mayfair
- 1986 Brian Henninger
- 1985 Greg Bruckner
- 1984 Kurt Bosen
- 1983 Mike Mathies
- 1982 Tony Grimes
- 1981 Ron Commans
- 1980 Brian Haugen
- 1979 Curt Byrum
- 1978 Mike Gove
- 1977 Lindy Miller
- 1976 Mike Reid
- 1975 John Fought
- 1974 Mark Pfeil
- 1973 Mike Brannan
- 1972 Mark Pfeil
- 1971 Jim McLean
- 1970 Mike Davis
- 1969 Mike Davis
- 1968 Ed Morris
- 1967 Ed Updegraff
