= 1922 Walker Cup =

Golf tournament

Coordinates: 40.909444°N 72.450833°W

1st Walker Cup Match
- Dates: August 28–29, 1922
- Venue: National Golf Links of America
- Location: Southampton, New York
- Captains: William C. Fownes Jr. (USA); Robert Harris (Great Britain)
(United States)	8	4	(United Kingdom)
- United States wins the Walker Cup

The 1922 Walker Cup, the first Walker Cup Match, was a team golf match played on August 28 and 29, 1922 at the National Golf Links of America in Southampton, New York. The United States won 8 to 4. There had been heavy rain for several days before the event and course was very wet.

== Format ==
In February 1922 the USGA sent an invitation to the R&A to send a team representing the British Isles to America to play a match against a team representing the USGA. It was suggested that 10 players-a-side would be a suitable number. The date suggested was just prior to the U.S. Amateur in early September. The letter also invited the R&A to send a team of four to the "Walker Cup" to take place at the National Golf Links of America after the Amateur Championship. The Invitation to play the International Match was accepted. The R&A appealed to clubs to subscribe to a fund to finance the expenses, estimated at £2,000 to £3,000. Expenses to and from the United States were paid together with costs in the United States up until the day of the event, but not thereafter, should the players choose to play in the Amateur Championship. In April there was still a report of two amateur team events; an 8 or 10 men team match at Brookline and a 4 men team event for the Walker Cup at the National. The "Walker Cup" mentioned was presumably intended to a multinational team event, similar to that planned for September 1921 but, as in 1921, it seems that no countries accepted the invitation. The 1922 match between America and British Isles became the first Walker Cup.

There were eight players in each team. Four 36-hole matches of foursomes were played on Monday August 28 and eight singles matches on Tuesday August 29. Each of the 12 matches was worth one point in the larger team competition. Matches level after 36 holes were played to a finish.

The total expense of the trip by the British team was £1,588. £787 was subscribed to the fund financing the tour leaving a deficit of £801. Without the hospitality of the Americans the expenses would have been considerably higher.

== Teams ==
=== Team United States ===
Playing captain: William C. Fownes Jr.

- Chick Evans
- Robert Gardner
- Jesse Guilford
- Bobby Jones
- Max Marston
- Francis Ouimet
- Jess Sweetser

=== Team Great Britain ===
Playing captain: (Scotland) Robert Harris

- (England) Colin Aylmer
- (Scotland) John Caven
- (England) Chubby Hooman
- (Scotland) Willis Mackenzie
- (England) Cyril Tolley
- (Scotland) William Breck Torrance
- (England) Roger Wethered
- (England) Bernard Darwin (reserve)

The Amateur Champion Ernest Holderness was unavailable for work reasons. Angus Hambro was to have been captain and reserve but private affairs prevented him from travelling.

The British team left Liverpool on August 3 on the Carmania and returned to Southampton on September 19 on the Aquitania.

Darwin, the golf correspondent of The Times, travelled with the team and became the official reserve. He was added to the team when Harris could not play, having been bitten "by a giant sandfly". He became "captain in the field" and played the American captain, Fownes, in the final singles match. Fownes had intended to stand down and reserve Jimmy Johnston was due to play Darwin but Harris persuaded Fownes to play.

== Monday's foursomes ==
	Results
Tolley/Darwin	(United States) 8 & 7	Guilford/Ouimet
Wethered/Aylmer	(United Kingdom) 5 & 4	Evans/Gardner
Torrance/Hooman	(United States) 3 & 2	Jones/Sweetser
Caven/Mackenzie	(United States) 2 & 1	Marston/Fownes
1	Session	3
1	Overall	3

== Tuesday's singles ==
	Results
Cyril Tolley	(United States) 2 & 1	Jesse Guilford
Roger Wethered	(United States) 3 & 2	Bobby Jones
John Caven	(United States) 5 & 4	Chick Evans
Colin Aylmer	(United States) 8 & 7	Francis Ouimet
William Breck Torrance	(United States) 7 & 5	Robert Gardner
Chubby Hooman	(United Kingdom) 37 holes	Jess Sweetser
Willis Mackenzie	(United Kingdom) 6 & 5	Max Marston
Bernard Darwin	(United Kingdom) 3 & 1	William C. Fownes Jr.
3	Session	5
4	Overall	8
