= Tony Torrance =

Scottish golfer

Personal information
- Full name: Thomas Arthur Torrance
- Nationality: Scotland
- Born: 13 March 1891 Edinburgh, Scotland
- Died: 8 December 1976 (aged 85) Sandwich, Kent, England

Career
- Sport: Golf
- Status: Amateur

Best results in major championships
- Masters Tournament: DNP
- PGA Championship: DNP
- U.S. Open: DNP
- The Open Championship: T22: 1932

Thomas Arthur 'Tony' Torrance (13 March 1891 – 8 December 1976) was a Scottish amateur golfer who played in the early 20th century. He played in five Walker Cup matches between 1924 and 1934.

== Early life ==
Torrance was born in Edinburgh in 1891. His older brother, William Breck, was also a noted amateur golfer.

== Golf career ==
Torrance played in five Walker Cup matches, 1924, 1928, 1930, 1932, 1934. He was the captain in 1932.

Torrance was joint runner-up in the 1927 German Open at Wannsee Berlin G&CC behind Percy Alliss. He was twice winner of the Worplesdon Mixed Foursomes, in 1921 when he was partnered with Eleanor Helme, and in 1934, when playing with Molly Gourlay.

== Death ==
Torrance died in Sandwich, Kent on 8 December 1976.

== Amateur wins ==
this list is incomplete

- 1925 Irish Amateur Open Championship
- 1926 Golf Illustrated Gold Vase (tie with Cyril Tolley)
- 1927 German Amateur
- 1929 German Amateur

== Team appearances ==
- Walker Cup (representing Great Britain): 1924, 1928, 1930, 1932 (playing captain), 1934
- England–Scotland Amateur Match (representing Scotland): 1922 (winners), 1923 (winners), 1925, 1926, 1928, 1929 (tie), 1930
