= John de Forest =

English golfer (1907–1997)

Personal information
- Full name: John Gerard de Forest aka John de Bendern
- Nationality: England
- Born: 31 March 1907 London, England
- Died: 10 April 1997 (aged 90) Tunbridge Wells, Kent, England

Career
- Sport: Golf
- Status: Amateur

Best results in major championships (wins: 1)
- Masters Tournament: 61st: 1953
- PGA Championship: DNP
- U.S. Open: DNP
- The Open Championship: CUT: 1930, 1932, 1933
- British Amateur: Won: 1932

John Gerard de Forest (31 March 1907 – 10 April 1997), also known as John de Bendern, was an English amateur golfer. He won the Amateur Championship in 1932 and was in the Walker Cup team the same year.

== Golf career ==
De Forest reached the final of the Amateur Championship in 1931, losing to Eric Martin Smith by 1 hole. The following year he reached the final again, this time beating Eric Fiddian 3&1. Both de Forest and Fiddian were selected for the 1932 Walker Cup team following their semi-final wins. The Walker Cup was held at The Country Club in Brookline, Massachusetts on 1 and 2 September. De Forest lost his foursomes match and was not selected for the singles.

== Personal life ==
De Forest was the younger son of Maurice de Forest. In the 1930s, Maurice de Forest was granted the title Count Maurice de Bendern, and in early 1937 John de Forest adopted the name John de Bendern. His first wife was Lady Patricia Sybil Douglas, daughter of Francis Douglas, 11th Marquess of Queensberry. Their children were:

- Caroline de Bendern (born 1940), who married saxophonist Barney Wilen. She was a political activist, who became symbol of May 1968 protests when she was photographed in Paris.
- Simon Frederick de Bendern (born 1946), who married Ethel von Horn in 1974.
- Emma Magdalen de Bendern (1950–2021)

He had two other children after his divorce from Patricia Douglas.

- Michael Fulke de Bendern (born 1954)
- Samantha Grace de Bendern (born 1965), international civil servant, political journalist and writer.

De Forest had an elder brother, Alaric (1905–1973), who also adopted the Bendern name. Alaric was also a useful golfer, and reached the semi-final of the Amateur Championship in 1937, losing 4&3 to Lionel Munn. John and Alaric met in the final of the 1937 Dutch Open Amateur Championship, with Alaric winning by one hole.

== Tournament wins ==
- 1931 Surrey Amateur Championship
- 1932 Amateur Championship
- 1937 Austrian Open Amateur Championship, Czechoslovakian Open Amateur Championship
- 1949 Surrey Amateur Championship

== Major championships ==
=== Wins (1) ===
Year	Championship	Winning score	Runner-up
1932	Amateur Championship	3 & 1	(England) Eric Fiddian

=== Results timeline ===
Tournament	1930	1931	1932	1933
The Open Championship	CUT	WD	CUT	CUT

Tournament	1949	1950	1951	1952	1953
Masters Tournament	WD				61

Note: de Forest only played in the Open Championship and the Masters.

Did not play

WD = withdrew
CUT = missed the half-way cut

== Team appearances ==
- Walker Cup (representing Great Britain): 1932
- England–Scotland Amateur Match (representing England): 1931
- England–Ireland Amateur Match (representing England): 1931 (winners)
