= Sandy Saddler (golfer) =

Scottish amateur golfer

Alexander Cramond "Sandy" Saddler (born August 1935) is a Scottish amateur golfer.

== Golf career ==
Saddler represented Britain 14 times and Scotland 22 times between 1959 and 1967. He represented Great Britain three times in the Walker Cup (1963, 1965, 1967) and was the non-playing captain of the team in 1977. In 1967, he was the only Great Britain player to win two singles in the Walker Cup. He was champion at Forfar Golf Club seven times.

== Team appearances ==
- Eisenhower Trophy (representing Great Britain & Ireland): 1962
- Walker Cup (representing Great Britain & Ireland): 1963, 1965 (tied), 1967, 1977 (non-playing captain)
- Commonwealth Tournament (representing Great Britain): 1959, 1963 (joint winners), 1967 (joint winners)
- Amateurs–Professionals Match (representing the Amateurs): 1959, 1960
- St Andrews Trophy (representing Great Britain & Ireland): 1960 (winners), 1962 (winners), 1964 (winners), 1966 (winners)
- European Amateur Team Championship (representing Scotland): 1965, 1967
- Men's Home Internationals (representing Scotland): 1959, 1960, 1961, 1962, 1963, 1964, 1966
