= William Tweddell =

English golfer (1897–1985)

Personal information
- Nationality: England
- Born: 21 March 1897 Whickham, County Durham, England
- Died: 5 November 1985 (aged 88) Stourbridge, Worcestershire, England

Career
- Sport: Golf
- Status: Amateur

Best results in major championships (wins: 1)
- Masters Tournament: DNP
- PGA Championship: DNP
- U.S. Open: DNP
- The Open Championship: T30: 1927
- British Amateur: Won: 1927

William Tweddell (21 March 1897 – 5 November 1985) was an English amateur golfer. He won the 1927 the Amateur Championship and was twice the British Walker Cup captain.

Tweddell was born in Whickham near Gateshead, County Durham. His family moved to Leyburn in north Yorkshire when he was young and he learnt to play golf at Leyburn Golf Club. He served in World War I and studied medicine at Aberdeen University, playing golf for the university in the early 1920s.

Tweddell won the Amateur Championship in 1927, beating Eustace Landale 7&6 in the final. Landale had a bad first round and Tweddell was six up after 9 holes and eight up at the end of the morning round. In the afternoon Tweddell reached the turn dormie-9 and, although Landale won the next two holes, Tweddell was comfortable winner. Later in the year Tweddell played in the Open Championship at St. Andrews. He was in seventh place in the qualifying but started with a disappointing 78 in the championship itself, and finished tied for 30th.

Tweddell was selected as the playing captain of the British 1928 Walker Cup team. The match was played at Chicago Golf Club and resulted in an 11–1 win for the American team.

Tweddell reached the final of the Amateur Championship in 1935, losing to the defending champion, Lawson Little. in the final. Little had won the previous year's final 14&13. Tweddell made a bad start and was 3 down after 5 holes. Little was 4 up after 8 holes but Tweddell has reduced the gap to 3 holes after the morning round. Little had a bad start in the afternoon and the deficit was reduced to 1 hole after the second. Little again extended his lead to three after 6 holes but Tweddell had a 2 and two 3s in the next six holes to level the match. Little won the 14th and 15th and then Tweddell won the 17th to take the match to the final hole. The 18th was halved in 4 and Little won the match 1 up.

Tweddell was selected as the playing captain of the 1936 Walker Cup team. The match was played at Pine Valley Golf Club. Tweddell chose not pick himself for either the foursomes or singles. The match resulted in a 9–0 win for the Americans with three matches halved.

== Amateur wins ==
this list may be incomplete

- 1927 The Amateur Championship, Midland Open

== Major championships ==
=== Wins (1) ===
Year	Championship	Winning score	Runner-up
1927	Amateur Championship	7 & 6	(England) Eustace Landale

=== Results timeline ===
Tournament	1927
The Open Championship	T30

Note: Tweddell only played in the Open Championship.
"T" indicates a tie for a place

== Team appearances ==
- Walker Cup (representing Great Britain): 1928 (playing captain), 1936 (playing captain)
- England–Scotland Amateur Match (representing England): 1928 (winners), 1929 (tie), 1930 (winners)
