= 1988 Eisenhower Trophy =

Coordinates: 59.495°N 18.152°E

Tournament information
- Dates: 15–18 September
- Location: Stockholm, Sweden
- Course: Ullna Golf Club
- Format: 72 holes stroke play

Statistics
- Par: 72
- Field: 39 teams 156 players

Champion
- Great Britain & Ireland; Peter McEvoy, Garth McGimpsey, Jim Milligan & Eoghan O'Connell
- 882 (+18)

The 1988 Eisenhower Trophy took place from 15 to 18 September at the Ullna Golf Club near Stockholm, Sweden. It was the 16th World Amateur Team Championship for the Eisenhower Trophy. The tournament was a 72-hole stroke play team event with 39 four-man teams, and the best three scores from each round counted towards the team total.

The combined team of Great Britain and Ireland won the Eisenhower Trophy for the third time, finishing five strokes ahead of the silver medalists, the United States. Australia took the bronze medal, finishing eight strokes further back, with Sweden in fourth place. Peter McEvoy, representing Great Britain and Ireland, recorded the lowest individual score at 4-under-par 284, six strokes ahead of Australian David Ecob.

== Teams ==
Thirty-nine four-man teams contested the event.

Country	Players
Argentina	Fernando Chiesa, Federico Macneil, Jaime Nougues, Julio Rivas
Australia	David Ecob, Bradley Hughes, Lester Peterson, Shane Robinson
Austria	Max Baltl, Markus Brier, Alexander Mueller, Andreas Palkuf
Belgium	Christophe Bosmans, Christophe Descampe, Bruno Dupont, Alain Eaton
Bermuda	Scott Mayne, Anthony Mocklow, David Purcell, J.R. Robinson
Brazil	Erik Anderson, Antonio Cha. Barcellos, Roberto Gomez, Colin Woods
Canada	Graham Cooke, Peter Major, Doug Roxburgh, Warren Sye
Chile	Michi Geyger, Michael Grasty, Roy Mackenzie, Felipe Taverne
Chinese Taipei	Chen Jung-hsin, Huang Hudh-jen, Lin Ken-chi, Lui Wen-Teh
Colombia	Fabio Bernal, Alberto Evers, Gustavo Giraldo, Felipe Harker
Costa Rica	Tomas Duenas, Manuel Jimenez, Charlie Perez, Jan Ruge
Czechoslovakia	Jan Juhaniak, Petr Mruzek, Miroslav Nemec, Jiri Zavazal
Denmark	Jan Anderson, Søren Bjørn, Christian Post, Henrik Simonsen
El Salvador	Guillermo Aceto, Jorge Cassaus, Victor Henriquez, Carlos Iraheta
Finland	Mikael Piltz, Vuha Selin, Riku Soravuo, Erkki Välimaa
France	Patrice Barquez, Christian Cévaër, François Illouz, Thomas Levet
Great Britain & Ireland	Peter McEvoy, Garth McGimpsey, Jim Milligan, Eoghan O'Connell
Greece	Ryno Bougas, George Nikitaides, Deane Pappas, Sean Pappas
Hong Kong	Dominique Boulet, Ian Hindhaugh, Richard Kan, Tang Man Kee
Iceland	Hilmar Bjorgvinsson, Björn Knutsson, Sveinn Sigurbergsson, Sigurdur Sigurdsson
India	Arnandeep Johl, Rajeev Mohla, Lakshman Singh, Jeev Milkha Singh
Italy	Mario Aragnetti, Enrico Nistri, Marco de Rossi, Marcello Santi
Ivory Coast	Djoman Doudjon, Hyacinthe Gnabe, Siaka Kone, Marcel Soumahoro
Japan	Ryoken Kawagishi, Ken Kusumoto, Kiyotaka Oie, Kiyoshi Okura
Mexico	Jorge Federico Ortiz Guadiano, Roberto Lebrija, Viviano Villarreal
Netherlands	Eelco Bouma, Stephan Lovey, Constant Smits van Waesberghe, Joost Steenkamer
Norway	Tom Fredriksen, Thomas Nielsen, Øyvind Rojahn, Tore Christian Sviland
New Zealand	Phil Aicken, Elliott Boult, Owen Kendall, Phil Tataurangi
Pakistan	Taimur Hassan, Faisal Qureshi, Waqar Saigol, Mohammed Sajid
Philippines	Cesar Ababa, Danilo Cabajar-Zarate, Nestor Plana, Carito Villaroman
Portugal	José Olivier Granja, Carlos M.A. dos Santos, Daniel P. da Silva, Ricardo J.J. da Silva
Singapore	M. Balraj, Samson Gimson, Kevin Lee, Douglas Oui
Spain	Jesús María Arruti, José Manuel Arruti, Yago Beamonte, Borja Queipo de Llano
Sweden	Anders Haglund, Cristian Härdin, John Lindberg, Fredrik Lindgren
Switzerland	André Bossert, Markus Frank, Thomas Gottstein, Paolo Quirici
United States	Kevin Johnson, Eric Meeks, Jay Sigel, Danny Yates
Venezuela	Henrique Lavie, Carlos Larrain, Emilio Miartus, Luis Soto
West Germany	Friedrich Kotter, Jan-Erik Schapmann, Sven Strüver, Ulrich Zig
Zimbabwe	Terry Bowes, Ross Dennett, Gerald McLaughlin, Anderson Ruske

== Scores ==
Place	Country	Score	To par
1st place, gold medalist(s)	Great Britain & Ireland	220-218-216-228=882	+18
2nd place, silver medalist(s)	United States	219-222-219-227=887	+23
3rd place, bronze medalist(s)	Australia	226-231-216-222=895	+31
4	Sweden	214-229-226-228=897	+33
5	France	225-230-227-217=899	+35
6	Denmark	230-218-230-228=906	+42
7	Spain	226-231-229-228=914	+50
T8	Canada	229-224-225-237=915	+51
T8	Japan	225-229-229-232=915	+51
10	New Zealand	226-237-220-233=916	+52
11	Chile	232-226-233-229=920	+56
12	Switzerland	230-238-220-235=923	+59
T13	Brazil	227-234-229-235=925	+61
T13	Finland	230-234-233-228=925	+61
15	Argentina	234-240-227-225=926	+62
16	Chinese Taipei	227-238-230-238=933	+69
17	West Germany	228-237-226-245=936	+72
18	Greece	236-231-234-236=937	+73
19	Bermuda	231-238-226-244=939	+75
20	India	231-235-238-240=944	+80
21	Netherlands	238-239-229-242=948	+84
22	Norway	238-241-232-239=950	+86
23	Italy	234-234-238-245=951	+87
24	Pakistan	241-244-232-239=956	+92
25	Belgium	229-246-236-246=957	+93
26	Austria	234-245-233-247=959	+95
27	Venezuela	235-246-235-244=960	+96
28	Colombia	233-248-241-240=962	+98
29	Hong Kong	239-250-236-240=965	+101
30	Philippines	240-240-246-242=968	+104
31	Portugal	243-248-239-242=972	+108
32	Mexico	237-250-236-250=973	+109
33	Singapore	244-251-234-249=978	+114
34	Ivory Coast	253-242-252-247=994	+130
35	Czechoslovakia	254-259-240-253=1006	+142
36	Zimbabwe	254-252-250-258=1014	+150
37	Costa Rica	251-252-255-272=1030	+166
38	El Salvador	281-293-278-280=1132	+268
DQ	Iceland	244-249-DQ	

== Individual leaders ==
Place	Player	Country	Score	To par
1	Peter McEvoy	Great Britain & Ireland	72-71-70-71=284	−4
2	David Ecob	Australia	70-71-75-74=290	+2
3	Danny Yates	United States	72-76-70-73=291	+3
T4	Jesús María Arruti	Spain	73-72-79-73=297	+9
T4	John Lindberg	Sweden	73-75-74-75=297	+9
6	Patrice Barquez	France	77-73-72-76=298	+10
7	Eric Meeks	United States	76-73-73-77=299	+11
T8	Ken Kusumoto	Japan	77-73-77-73=300	+12
T8	Fredrik Lindgren	Sweden	69-77-78-76=300	+12
T8	Garth McGimpsey	Great Britain & Ireland	76-72-74-78=300	+12
T8	Eoghan O'Connell	Great Britain & Ireland	73-75-72-80=300	+12
T8	Shane Robinson	Australia	76-80-72-72=300	+12
