= 1969 Walker Cup =

Golf tournament

22nd Walker Cup Match
- Dates: August 22–23, 1969
- Venue: Milwaukee Country Club
- Location: River Hills, Wisconsin
- Captains: Billy Joe Patton (USA); Michael Bonallack (GB&I)
(United States)	10	8	(United Kingdom) (Republic of Ireland)
- United States wins the Walker Cup

The 1969 Walker Cup, the 22nd Walker Cup Match, was played on August 22 and 23, 1969, at Milwaukee Country Club, River Hills near Milwaukee, Wisconsin. The event was won by the United States, 10 to 8, with 6 matches halved. The United States led by 4 points after the first day and, although Great Britain and Ireland won both the foursomes and singles sessions on the second day, the United States won by two points.

== Format ==
The format for play on Friday and Saturday was the same. There were four matches of foursomes in the morning and eight singles matches in the afternoon. In all, 24 matches were played.

Each of the 24 matches was worth one point in the larger team competition. If a match was all square after the 18th hole extra holes were not played. The team with most points won the competition. If the two teams were tied, the previous winner would retain the trophy. This was the last Walker Cup in which half points were not awarded for halved matches.

== Teams ==
Ten players for the United States and Great Britain & Ireland participated in the event. Great Britain & Ireland had a playing captain, while the United States had a non-playing captain.

=== United States ===
Captain: Billy Joe Patton

- John Bohmann
- Bruce Fleisher
- Vinny Giles
- Bill Hyndman
- Joe Inman
- Steve Melnyk
- Allen Miller
- Dick Siderowf
- Ed Updegraff
- Lanny Wadkins

=== Great Britain & Ireland ===
&
Playing captain: (England) Michael Bonallack

- (England) Peter Benka
- (Scotland) Andrew Brooks
- (Republic of Ireland) Tom Craddock
- (England) Bruce Critchley
- (England) Rodney Foster
- (Scotland) Charlie Green
- (England) Michael King
- (England) Geoff Marks
- (England) Peter Tupling

== Friday's matches ==
=== Morning foursomes ===
&	Results
Bonallack/Craddock	(United States) 3 & 2	Giles/Melnyk
Benka/Critchley	halved	Fleisher/Miller
Green/Brooks	(United Kingdom) (Republic of Ireland) 3 & 2	Wadkins/Siderowf
Foster/Marks	(United States) 2 & 1	Hyndman/Inman
1	Foursomes	2
1	Overall	2

=== Afternoon singles ===
&	Results
Michael Bonallack	halved	Bruce Fleisher
Charlie Green	(United States) 1 up	Vinny Giles
Bruce Critchley	(United States) 1 up	Allen Miller
Peter Tupling	(United States) 6 & 5	Dick Siderowf
Peter Benka	(United Kingdom) (Republic of Ireland) 3 & 1	Steve Melnyk
Geoff Marks	(United Kingdom) (Republic of Ireland) 1 up	Lanny Wadkins
Michael King	(United States) 2 & 1	John Bohmann
Rodney Foster	(United States) 6 & 5	Ed Updegraff
2	Singles	5
3	Overall	7

== Saturday's matches ==
=== Morning foursomes ===
&	Results
Green/Brooks	halved	Giles/Melnyk
Benka/Critchley	(United Kingdom) (Republic of Ireland) 2 & 1	Fleisher/Miller
Foster/King	(United States) 6 & 5	Siderowf/Wadkins
Bonallack/Tipling	(United Kingdom) (Republic of Ireland) 4 & 3	Updegraff/Bohmann
2	Foursomes	1
5	Overall	8

=== Afternoon singles ===
&	Results
Michael Bonallack	(United Kingdom) (Republic of Ireland) 5 & 4	Bruce Fleisher
Bruce Critchley	halved	Dick Siderowf
Michael King	(United States) 1 up	Allen Miller
Tom Craddock	halved	Vinny Giles
Peter Benka	(United States) 2 & 1	Joe Inman
Andrew Brooks	(United Kingdom) (Republic of Ireland) 4 & 3	John Bohmann
Charlie Green	halved	Bill Hyndman
Geoff Marks	(United Kingdom) (Republic of Ireland) 3 & 2	Ed Updegraff
3	Singles	2
8	Overall	10
