= 1924 Walker Cup =

Golf tournament

Coordinates: 40.909444°N 72.450833°W

3rd Walker Cup Match
- Dates: September 12–13, 1924
- Venue: Garden City Golf Club
- Location: Garden City, New York
- Captains: Robert Gardner (USA); Cyril Tolley (Great Britain)
(United States)	9	3	(United Kingdom)
- United States wins the Walker Cup

The 1924 Walker Cup, the third Walker Cup Match, was a team golf match played on September 12 and 13, 1924 at the Garden City Golf Club in Garden City, New York. The United States won 9 to 3. This was the last annual Match before it became biennial with the next match being held in 1926

== Format ==
Each team had ten golfers. Four 36-hole matches of foursomes were played on Friday and eight singles matches on Saturday. Each of the 12 matches was worth one point in the larger team competition. Matches tied after 36 holes were halved.

== Teams ==
=== Team United States ===
Playing captain: Robert Gardner

- Chick Evans
- William C. Fownes Jr.
- Jesse Guilford
- Harrison Johnston
- Bobby Jones
- Max Marston
- Francis Ouimet
- Jess Sweetser
- Dr. Oscar Willing

=== Team Great Britain ===
Playing captain: (England) Cyril Tolley

- (England) Orme Bristowe
- (Northern Ireland) Maj. Charles Hezlet
- (Scotland) William Hope
- (Scotland) Denys Kyle
- (Scotland) William Murray
- (England) Hon. Michael Scott
- (Scotland) Robert Scott Jr.
- (England) Eustace Storey
- (England) Tony Torrance

== Friday's foursomes ==
	Results
Marston/Gardner	(United States) 3 & 1	Storey/Murray
Guilford/Ouimet	(United States) 2 & 1	Tolley/Hezlet
Jones/Fownes Jr.	(United Kingdom) 1 hole	Scott/Scott Jr.
Sweetser/Johnston	(United States) 4 & 3	Torrance/Bristowe
3	Session	1
3	Overall	1

== Saturday's singles ==
	Results
Max Marston	(United Kingdom) 1 hole	Cyril Tolley
Bobby Jones	(United States) 4 & 3	Maj. Charles Hezlet
Chick Evans	(United States) 2 & 1	William Murray
Francis Ouimet	(United States) 1 hole	Eustace Storey
Jess Sweetser	(United Kingdom) 7 & 6	Hon. Michael Scott
Robert Gardner	(United States) 3 & 2	William Hope
Jesse Guilford	(United States) 2 & 1	Tony Torrance
Dr. Oscar Willing	(United States) 3 & 2	Denys Kyle
6	Session	2
9	Overall	3
