= 1993 Walker Cup =

Golf tournament

34th Walker Cup Match
- Dates: August 18–19, 1993
- Venue: Interlachen Country Club
- Location: Edina, Minnesota
- Captains: Vinny Giles (USA); George Macgregor (GB&I)
(United States)	19	5	(United Kingdom) (Republic of Ireland)
- United States wins the Walker Cup

The 1993 Walker Cup, the 34th Walker Cup Match, was played on August 18 and 19, 1993, at Interlachen Country Club, Edina, Minnesota. The event was won by the United States 19 to 5.

The event was originally to be played at Chicago Golf Club but they withdrew in 1991 because of pressure due to their membership policy relating to minorities and women.

== Format ==
The original format for play on Wednesday and Thursday was the same. There were to be four matches of foursomes in the morning and eight singles matches in the afternoon. In all, 24 matches were to be played. Because of heavy overnight rain the first day foursomes were abandoned. The format was revised so that were 10 singles matches on both days, resulting in an unchanged total of 24 matches.

Each of the 24 matches was worth one point in the larger team competition. If a match was all square after the 18th hole extra holes were not played. Rather, each side earned ½ a point toward their team total. The team that accumulated at least 12½ points won the competition. If the two teams were tied, the previous winner would retain the trophy.

== Teams ==
Ten players for the United States and Great Britain & Ireland participated in the event plus one non-playing captain for each team.

=== United States ===
Captain: Vinny Giles

- David Berganio Jr.
- Todd Demsey
- Allen Doyle
- Brian Gay
- John Harris
- Tim Herron
- Justin Leonard
- Kelly Mitchum
- Jay Sigel
- Danny Yates

=== Great Britain & Ireland ===
&
Captain: (Scotland) George Macgregor

- (Northern Ireland) Raymond Burns
- (England) Stuart Cage
- (Wales) Bradley Dredge
- (Republic of Ireland) Pádraig Harrington
- (England) Paul Page
- (England) Van Phillips
- (England) Iain Pyman
- (Scotland) Dean Robertson
- (Scotland) Raymond Russell
- (England) Matt Stanford

== Wednesday's matches ==
=== Morning foursomes ===
The first day foursomes were abandoned because of heavy overnight rain. The format was revised so that were 10 singles matches on both days.

=== Afternoon singles ===
&	Results
Iain Pyman	(United States) 1 up	Allen Doyle
Matt Stanford	(United Kingdom) (Republic of Ireland) 3 & 2	David Berganio Jr.
Dean Robertson	(United Kingdom) (Republic of Ireland) 3 & 2	Jay Sigel
Stuart Cage	halved	Kelly Mitchum
Pádraig Harrington	(United States) 1 up	Tim Herron
Paul Page	(United States) 2 & 1	Danny Yates
Raymond Russell	(United States) 2 & 1	Todd Demsey
Raymond Burns	(United States) 4 & 3	Justin Leonard
Van Phillips	(United Kingdom) (Republic of Ireland) 2 & 1	Brian Gay
Bradley Dredge	(United States) 4 & 3	John Harris
3½	Singles	6½
3½	Overall	6½

== Thursday's matches ==
=== Morning foursomes ===
&	Results
Pyman/Cage	(United States) 4 & 3	Doyle/Leonard
Stanford/Harrington	(United States) 3 & 2	Berganio/Demsey
Dredge/Phillips	(United States) 3 & 2	Sigel/Mitchum
Russell/Robertson	(United States) 1 up	Harris/Herron
0	Foursomes	4
3½	Overall	10½

=== Afternoon singles ===
&	Results
Dean Robertson	(United States) 4 & 3	Allen Doyle
Iain Pyman	(United States) 3 & 2	John Harris
Stuart Cage	(United States) 2 & 1	Danny Yates
Pádraig Harrington	halved	Brian Gay
Paul Page	(United States) 5 & 4	Jay Sigel
Van Phillips	(United States) 3 & 2	Tim Herron
Raymond Russell	(United States) 4 & 2	Kelly Mitchum
Raymond Burns	(United Kingdom) (Republic of Ireland) 1 up	David Berganio Jr.
Bradley Dredge	(United States) 3 & 2	Todd Demsey
Matt Stanford	(United States) 5 & 4	Justin Leonard
1½	Singles	8½
5	Overall	19
