= 1979 Walker Cup =

Golf tournament

27th Walker Cup Match
- Dates: 30–31 May 1979
- Venue: Muirfield
- Location: Gullane, East Lothian, Scotland
- Captains: Rodney Foster (GB&I); Dick Siderowf (USA)
(United Kingdom) (Republic of Ireland)	8½	15½	(United States)
- United States wins the Walker Cup

The 1979 Walker Cup, the 27th Walker Cup golf match, was played on 30 and 31 May 1979, at Muirfield, Gullane, East Lothian, Scotland. The event was won by the United States 15½ to 8½.

The United States had an 8½ to 7½ lead after the second day foursomes. In the final round of 8 singles, Great Britain and Ireland had just one win, by Allan Brodie, while the United States won the other 7 matches for a convincing win.

== Format ==
The format for play on Wednesday and Thursday was the same. There were four matches of foursomes in the morning and eight singles matches in the afternoon. In all, 24 matches were played.

Each of the 24 matches was worth one point in the larger team competition. If a match was all square after the 18th hole extra holes were not played. Rather, each side earned ½ a point toward their team total. The team that accumulated at least 12½ points won the competition. If the two teams were tied, the previous winner would retain the trophy.

== Teams ==
Ten players for the United States and Great Britain & Ireland participated in the event plus one non-playing captain for each team.

=== Great Britain & Ireland ===
&
Captain: (England) Rodney Foster

- (Scotland) Gordon Brand Jnr
- (Scotland) Allan Brodie
- (Wales) Jimmy Buckley
- (Scotland) Iain Carslaw
- (England) John Davies
- (England) Geoffrey Godwin
- (Scotland) Ian Hutcheon
- (England) Michael Kelley
- (Scotland) Brian Marchbank
- (England) Peter McEvoy

=== United States ===
Captain: Dick Siderowf

- Doug Clarke
- Doug Fischesser
- Mike Gove
- Scott Hoch
- Jim Holtgrieve
- Griff Moody
- Mike Peck
- Jay Sigel
- Hal Sutton
- Marty West

== Wednesday's matches ==
=== Morning foursomes ===
&	Results
McEvoy/Marchbank	(United States) 1 up	Hoch/Sigel
Godwin/Hutcheon	(United Kingdom) (Republic of Ireland) 2 up	West/Sutton
Brand/Kelley	(United States) 1 up	Fischesser/Holtgrieve
Brodie/Carslaw	(United Kingdom) (Republic of Ireland) 2 & 1	Griff/Gove
2	Foursomes	2
2	Overall	2

=== Afternoon singles ===
&	Results
Peter McEvoy	halved	Jay Sigel
John Davies	(United States) 8 & 7	Doug Clarke
Ian Hutcheon	(United States) 6 & 4	Jim Holtgrieve
Jimmy Buckley	(United States) 9 & 7	Scott Hoch
Brian Marchbank	(United Kingdom) (Republic of Ireland) 1 up	Mike Peck
Geoffrey Godwin	(United Kingdom) (Republic of Ireland) 3 & 2	Griff Moody
Michael Kelley	(United Kingdom) (Republic of Ireland) 3 & 2	Doug Fischesser
Allan Brodie	(United States) 3 & 2	Mike Gove
3½	Singles	4½
5½	Overall	6½

== Thursday's matches ==
=== Morning foursomes ===
&	Results
Godwin/Brand	(United States) 4 & 3	Hoch/Sigel
Kelley/Hutcheon	halved	West/Sutton
McEvoy/Marchbank	(United Kingdom) (Republic of Ireland) 2 & 1	Fischesser/Holtgrieve
Carslaw/Brodie	halved	Clarke/Peck
2	Foursomes	2
7½	Overall	8½

=== Afternoon singles ===
&	Results
Peter McEvoy	(United States) 3 & 1	Scott Hoch
Gordon Brand Jnr	(United States) 2 & 1	Doug Clarke
Geoffrey Godwin	(United States) 3 & 2	Mike Gove
Ian Hutcheon	(United States) 2 & 1	Mike Peck
Allan Brodie	(United Kingdom) (Republic of Ireland) 3 & 2	Marty West
Michael Kelley	(United States) 3 & 2	Griff Moody
Brian Marchbank	(United States) 3 & 1	Hal Sutton
Iain Carslaw	(United States) 2 & 1	Jay Sigel
1	Singles	7
8½	Overall	15½
