= Ed White (golfer) =

American golfer and engineer (1913–1999)

Edward White (October 29, 1913 – September 18, 1999) was an American amateur golfer. He had impressive golf achievements in the early to mid-1930s, winning several significant titles, and represented the United States, but never turned professional at golf, since the prize money was low at that time. He graduated in engineering from the University of Texas, and had a successful oil business career.

== Golf career ==
Edward White was a self-taught player from Bonham, Texas. He had worked as a caddie at the golf club in Bonham, but had minimal playing privileges there, so he laid out his own six-hole course, with the help of friends, and played on that. He studied photos of famous players, such as Bobby Jones and Walter Hagen, in golf magazines, to teach himself how to play. He moved to Austin, Texas in the summer of 1931, and joined the Austin Country Club. He enrolled at the University of Texas as an Engineering student in the fall of 1931, and made the varsity golf team, playing for coach Harvey Penick. At that stage, he had never had a golf lesson from a professional. In February 1932, White scored 252 for 72 holes in the qualifying tournament for the Texas university team, playing at the Austin Country Club (Riverside Drive course), with rounds of 61-64-65-62, winning the Massengill Trophy comfortably; his score in that event has never been challenged, and it may be the lowest ever recorded in the history of golf, over 72 holes on a regulation golf course. The current 72-hole scoring record on the PGA Tour is 254, set by Tommy Armour III in 2003.

As a freshman that year, White was ineligible at the time for full varsity competition (the rule was later changed). He won three consecutive Southwest Conference individual titles in golf, from 1933 to 1935. White advanced to the quarterfinals of the 1933 NCAA Golf Championship, lost in the finals of the 1934 NCAAs, but in 1935, he defeated Fred Haas in the finals of that event, held at the Congressional Country Club. He was the first University of Texas player to win this event. He won the Mexican Amateur Championship in 1935.

After graduation, White accepted a job in petroleum engineering with Gulf Oil, moved to Houston, and joined the Houston Country Club. He represented the United States in the 1936 Walker Cup at the Pine Valley Golf Club, winning all of his matches, and helping his team win the event. With the world still mired in the Great Depression at that time, and the PGA Tour still in its formative years, the prize money available in golf was still quite low. From 1936 onwards, White focused on his engineering career, started a family, and played some amateur golf in the state of Texas, all with success.

== Tributes ==
Penick, who later coached Betsy Rawls, Mickey Wright, Kathy Whitworth, Tom Kite, and Ben Crenshaw (all members of the World Golf Hall of Fame), and who is himself a member of the World Golf Hall of Fame, wrote that had White turned professional at golf in the mid-1930s, he would have been the best of his time. Penick stated that White had as much talent for golf as anyone he ever saw, drove the ball as long and accurately as Byron Nelson and Ben Hogan did in their primes, and was the best long-iron player he saw until the arrival of Jack Nicklaus on the PGA Tour in the early 1960s. Fred Haas, who later won the Canadian Amateur Championship and five events on the PGA Tour, said that White was the best player he ever saw.

White was inducted into the Texas Golf Hall of Fame in 1983.

== U.S. national team appearances ==
Amateur

- Walker Cup: 1936 (winners)
