= 1995 Walker Cup =

Golf tournament

Coordinates: 51.492°N 3.726°W

35th Walker Cup Match
- Dates: 9–10 September 1995
- Venue: Royal Porthcawl Golf Club
- Location: Porthcawl, Wales
- Captains: Clive Brown (GB&I); Downing Gray (USA)
(United Kingdom) (Republic of Ireland)	14	10	(United States)
- Great Britain & Ireland wins the Walker Cup

The 1995 Walker Cup, the 35th Walker Cup Match, was a team golf match played on 9 and 10 September 1995, at Royal Porthcawl Golf Club in Porthcawl, Wales. The event was won by the Great Britain and Ireland team 14 to 10.

== Format ==
The format for play on Saturday and Sunday was the same. There were four matches of foursomes in the morning and eight singles matches in the afternoon. In all, 24 matches were played.

Each of the 24 matches is worth one point in the larger team competition. If a match is all square after the 18th hole extra holes are not played. Rather, each side earns ½ a point toward their team total. The team that accumulates at least 12 ½ points wins the competition. If the two teams are tied, the previous winner retains the trophy.

== Teams ==
Ten players for the USA and Great Britain & Ireland participate in the event plus one non-playing captain for each team.

=== Great Britain & Ireland ===
&
Captain: (Wales) Clive Brown

- (Republic of Ireland) Jody Fanagan
- (England) Mark Foster
- (Scotland) Stephen Gallacher
- (Republic of Ireland) Pádraig Harrington
- (Scotland) Barclay Howard
- (England) David Howell
- (England) Lee S. James
- (Scotland) Graham Rankin
- (Scotland) Gordon Sherry
- (England) Gary Wolstenholme

=== United States ===
Captain: Downing Gray

- Notah Begay III
- Alan Bratton
- Jerry Courville Jr.
- Kris Cox
- John Harris
- Tim Jackson
- Trip Kuehne
- Buddy Marucci
- Chris Riley
- Tiger Woods

== Saturday's matches ==
=== Morning foursomes ===
&	Results
Sherry/Gallacher	(United States) 4 & 3	Harris/Woods
Foster/Howell	halved	Bratton/Riley
Rankin/Howard	(United States) 4 & 3	Begay/Jackson
Harrington/Fanagan	(United Kingdom) (Republic of Ireland) 5 & 3	Cox/Kuehne
1½	Foursomes	2½
1½	Overall	2½

=== Afternoon singles ===
&	Results
Gordon Sherry	(United Kingdom) (Republic of Ireland) 3 & 2	Notah Begay III
Lee S. James	(United States) 1 up	Kris Cox
Mark Foster	(United Kingdom) (Republic of Ireland) 4 & 3	Buddy Marucci
Stephen Gallacher	(United Kingdom) (Republic of Ireland) 4 & 3	Tim Jackson
Pádraig Harrington	(United Kingdom) (Republic of Ireland) 2 up	Jerry Courville Jr.
Barclay Howard	halved	Alan Bratton
Graham Rankin	(United States) 1 up	John Harris
Gary Wolstenholme	(United Kingdom) (Republic of Ireland) 1 up	Tiger Woods
5½	Singles	2½
7	Overall	5

== Sunday's matches ==
=== Morning foursomes ===
&	Results
Sherry/Gallacher	(United States) 4 & 2	Bratton/Riley
Foster/Howell	(United Kingdom) (Republic of Ireland) 3 & 2	Cox/Kuehne
Wolstenholme/James	(United States) 6 & 5	Marucci/Courville
Harrington/Fanagan	(United Kingdom) (Republic of Ireland) 2 & 1	Harris/Woods
2	Foursomes	2
9	Overall	7

=== Afternoon singles ===
&	Results
Gordon Sherry	(United Kingdom) (Republic of Ireland) 2 up	Chris Riley
David Howell	(United Kingdom) (Republic of Ireland) 2 & 1	Notah Begay III
Stephen Gallacher	(United Kingdom) (Republic of Ireland) 3 & 2	Trip Kuehne
Jody Fanagan	(United Kingdom) (Republic of Ireland) 3 & 2	Jerry Courville Jr.
Barclay Howard	halved	Tim Jackson
Mark Foster	halved	Buddy Marucci
Pádraig Harrington	(United States) 3 & 2	John Harris
Gary Wolstenholme	(United States) 4 & 3	Tiger Woods
5	Singles	3
14	Overall	10
