= 1965 Walker Cup =

Golf tournament

20th Walker Cup Match
- Dates: September 3–4, 1965
- Venue: Baltimore Country Club
- Location: Baltimore, Maryland
- Captains: Johnny Fischer (USA); Joe Carr (GB&I)
| (United States) | 11 | 11 | (United Kingdom) (Republic of Ireland) |
- United States retains the Walker Cup

The 1965 Walker Cup, the 20th Walker Cup Match, was played on September 3 and 4, 1965, at Baltimore Country Club, Baltimore, Maryland. The event was tied at 11 matches each with 2 matches halved.

Great Britain and Ireland took an 8–3 lead after the first day after winning six of the singles matches. They shared the second day foursomes and needed just two win in the singles. Gordon Cosh won his match but it seemed that the other seven matches would be lost. However Clive Clark, two down with three to play, halved his match. The overall match was tied at 11 each with the United States retaining the Cup, having won in 1963. Joe Carr, the Great Britain and Ireland playing captain, did not select himself for any of the matches.

== Format ==
The format for play on Friday and Saturday was the same. There were four matches of foursomes in the morning and eight singles matches in the afternoon. In all, 24 matches were played.

Each of the 24 matches was worth one point in the larger team competition. If a match was all square after the 18th hole extra holes were not played. The team with most points won the competition. If the two teams were tied, the previous winner would retain the trophy.

== Teams ==
Ten players for the United States and Great Britain & Ireland participated in the event. Great Britain & Ireland had a playing captain, while the United States had a non-playing captain.

=== United States ===
Captain: Johnny Fischer

- Don Allen
- Deane Beman
- William C. Campbell
- Dave Eichelberger
- Downing Gray
- John Mark Hopkins
- Dale Morey
- Billy Joe Patton
- Ed Tutwiler
- Ed Updegraff

=== Great Britain & Ireland ===
&
Playing captain: (Republic of Ireland) Joe Carr

- (England) Michael Bonallack
- (England) Clive Clark
- (England) Gordon Clark
- (Scotland) Gordon Cosh
- (England) Rodney Foster
- (England) Michael Lunt
- (Scotland) Sandy Saddler
- (Scotland) Ronnie Shade
- (England) Peter Townsend

== Friday's matches ==
=== Morning foursomes ===
| & | Results |
|---|---|---|
| Lunt/Cosh | (United Kingdom) (Republic of Ireland) 1 up | Campbell/Gray |
| Bonallack/C. Clark | halved | Beman/Allen |
| Foster/G. Clark | (United States) 5 & 4 | Patton/Tutwiler |
| Townsend/Shade | (United Kingdom) (Republic of Ireland) 2 & 1 | Hopkins/Eichelberger |
| 2 | Foursomes | 1 |
| 2 | Overall | 1 |

=== Afternoon singles ===
| & | Results |
|---|---|---|
| Michael Bonallack | (United States) 6 & 5 | William C. Campbell |
| Rodney Foster | (United States) 2 up | Deane Beman |
| Ronnie Shade | (United Kingdom) (Republic of Ireland) 3 & 1 | Downing Gray |
| Clive Clark | (United Kingdom) (Republic of Ireland) 5 & 3 | John Mark Hopkins |
| Peter Townsend | (United Kingdom) (Republic of Ireland) 3 & 2 | Billy Joe Patton |
| Sandy Saddler | (United Kingdom) (Republic of Ireland) 2 & 1 | Dale Morey |
| Gordon Cosh | (United Kingdom) (Republic of Ireland) 2 up | Don Allen |
| Michael Lunt | (United Kingdom) (Republic of Ireland) 2 & 1 | Ed Updegraff |
| 6 | Singles | 2 |
| 8 | Overall | 3 |

== Saturday's matches ==
=== Morning foursomes ===
| & | Results |
|---|---|---|
| Saddler/Foster | (United States) 4 & 3 | Campbell/Gray |
| Shade/Townsend | (United Kingdom) (Republic of Ireland) 2 & 1 | Beman/Eichelberger |
| Cosh/Lunt | (United States) 2 & 1 | Tutwiler/Patton |
| C. Clark/Bonallack | (United Kingdom) (Republic of Ireland) 2 & 1 | Allen/Morey |
| 2 | Foursomes | 2 |
| 10 | Overall | 5 |

=== Afternoon singles ===
| & | Results |
|---|---|---|
| Rodney Foster | (United States) 3 & 2 | William C. Campbell |
| Sandy Saddler | (United States) 1 up | Deane Beman |
| Ronnie Shade | (United States) 5 & 3 | Ed Tutwiler |
| Gordon Cosh | (United Kingdom) (Republic of Ireland) 4 & 3 | Don Allen |
| Peter Townsend | (United States) 1 up | Downing Gray |
| Clive Clark | halved | John Mark Hopkins |
| Michael Bonallack | (United States) 5 & 3 | Dave Eichelberger |
| Michael Lunt | (United States) 4 & 2 | Billy Joe Patton |
| 1 | Singles | 6 |
| 11 | Overall | 11 |
