= 1983 Walker Cup =

Golf tournament

29th Walker Cup Match
- Dates: 25–26 May 1983
- Venue: Royal Liverpool Golf Club
- Location: Hoylake, England
- Captains: Charlie Green (GB&I); Jay Sigel (USA)
| (United Kingdom) (Republic of Ireland) | 10½ | 13½ | (United States) |
- United States wins the Walker Cup

The 1983 Walker Cup, the 29th Walker Cup Match, was played on 25 and 26 May 1983, at Royal Liverpool Golf Club, Hoylake, England. The event was won by the United States 13½ to 10½.

The match was level after the second day foursomes. In the final round of 8 singles, Great Britain and Ireland had just two wins, by Philip Walton and Andrew Oldcorn, both of whom had also won their singles on the first day. The United States won 5 of the singles matches and halved the other to win the Walker Cup for the sixth successive time.

== Format ==
The format for play on Wednesday and Thursday was the same. There were four matches of foursomes in the morning and eight singles matches in the afternoon. In all, 24 matches were played.

Each of the 24 matches was worth one point in the larger team competition. If a match was all square after the 18th hole extra holes were not played. Rather, each side earned ½ a point toward their team total. The team that accumulated at least 12½ points won the competition. If the two teams were tied, the previous winner would retain the trophy.

== Teams ==
Ten players for the United States and Great Britain & Ireland participated in the event. The United States had a playing captain, while Great Britain & Ireland had a non-playing captain.

=== Great Britain & Ireland ===
&
Captain: (England) Charlie Green

- (Scotland) David Carrick
- (England) Stephen Keppler
- (England) Malcolm Lewis
- (Scotland) George Macgregor
- (Scotland) Lindsay Mann
- (England) Andrew Oldcorn
- (Wales) Philip Parkin
- (Republic of Ireland) Arthur Pierse
- (England) Martin Thompson
- (Republic of Ireland) Philip Walton

=== United States ===
Playing captain: Jay Sigel

- Nathaniel Crosby
- Brad Faxon
- Rick Fehr
- William Hoffer
- Jim Holtgrieve
- Bob Lewis
- David Tentis
- Billy Tuten
- Willie Wood

== Wednesday's matches ==
=== Morning foursomes ===
| & | Results |
|---|---|---|
| Macgregor/Walton | (United Kingdom) (Republic of Ireland) 3 & 2 | Sigel/Fehr |
| Keppler/Pierse | (United States) 3 & 1 | Wood/Faxon |
| Lewis/Thompson | (United States) 7 & 6 | Lewis/Holtgrieve |
| Mann/Oldcorn | (United Kingdom) (Republic of Ireland) 5 & 4 | Hoffer/Tentis |
| 2 | Foursomes | 2 |
| 2 | Overall | 2 |

=== Afternoon singles ===
| & | Results |
|---|---|---|
| Philip Walton | (United Kingdom) (Republic of Ireland) 1 up | Jay Sigel |
| Stephen Keppler | (United States) 1 up | Rick Fehr |
| George Macgregor | halved | Willie Wood |
| David Carrick | (United States) 3 & 1 | Brad Faxon |
| Andrew Oldcorn | (United Kingdom) (Republic of Ireland) 4 & 3 | Billy Tuten |
| Philip Parkin | (United Kingdom) (Republic of Ireland) 6 & 4 | Nathaniel Crosby |
| Arthur Pierse | (United States) 3 & 1 | Bob Lewis |
| Lindsay Mann | (United States) 6 & 5 | Jim Holtgrieve |
| 3½ | Singles | 4½ |
| 5½ | Overall | 6½ |

== Thursday's matches ==
=== Morning foursomes ===
| & | Results |
|---|---|---|
| Macgregor/Walton | (United States) 2 up | Crosby/Hoffer |
| Parkin/Thompson | (United Kingdom) (Republic of Ireland) 1 up | Faxon/Wood |
| Mann/Oldcorn | (United Kingdom) (Republic of Ireland) 1 up | Lewis/Holtgrieve |
| Keppler/Pierse | halved | Sigel/Fehr |
| 2½ | Foursomes | 1½ |
| 8 | Overall | 8 |

=== Afternoon singles ===
| & | Results |
|---|---|---|
| Philip Walton | (United Kingdom) (Republic of Ireland) 2 & 1 | Willie Wood |
| Philip Parkin | (United States) 3 & 2 | Brad Faxon |
| George Macgregor | (United States) 2 & 1 | Rick Fehr |
| Martin Thompson | (United States) 3 & 2 | Billy Tuten |
| Lindsay Mann | halved | David Tentis |
| Stephen Keppler | (United States) 6 & 5 | Bob Lewis |
| Andrew Oldcorn | (United Kingdom) (Republic of Ireland) 3 & 2 | Jim Holtgrieve |
| David Carrick | (United States) 3 & 1 | Jay Sigel |
| 2½ | Singles | 5½ |
| 10½ | Overall | 13½ |
