= 1932 Walker Cup =

Golf tournament

7th Walker Cup Match
- Dates: September 1–2, 1932
- Venue: The Country Club
- Location: Brookline, Massachusetts
- Captains: Francis Ouimet (USA); Tony Torrance (GB&I)
(United States)	8	1	(United Kingdom) (Republic of Ireland)
- United States wins the Walker Cup

The 1932 Walker Cup, the 7th Walker Cup Match, was played on September 1 and 2, 1932, at The Country Club, Brookline, Massachusetts. The United States won by 8 matches to 1 with 3 matches halved.

Because of the economic situation, there had been some doubt as to whether the match would take place. However, in January it was announced that the match would take place.

== Format ==
Four 36-hole matches of foursomes were played on Thursday and eight singles matches on Friday. Each of the 12 matches was worth one point in the larger team competition. If a match was all square after the 36th hole extra holes were not played. The team with most points won the competition. If the two teams were tied, the previous winner would retain the trophy.

== Teams ==
8 members of the 10-man Great Britain and Ireland team were announced in early April but no captain was mentioned at that time. The remaining two were announced in late May; John de Forest and Eric Fiddian, the two finalists in the Amateur Championship. Torrance was announced as the captain at the same time. 10 members of the 11-man United States team were selected at the end of May. Gus Moreland was added to the team in late August, as winner of the Western Amateur. Jimmy Johnston for the United States and Jack Bookless for Great Britain and Ireland were not selected for any matches. Johnston had been suffering from a twisted ankle and was not fully fit. Lister Hartley (1904–1969) and Rex Hartley (1905–1942) were brothers.

=== United States ===
Playing captain: Francis Ouimet

- George Dunlap
- Billy Howell
- Jimmy Johnston
- Maurice McCarthy
- Don Moe
- Gus Moreland
- Charles Seaver
- Jess Sweetser
- George Voigt
- Jack Westland

=== Great Britain & Ireland ===
&
Playing captain: (Scotland) Tony Torrance

- (Scotland) Jack Bookless
- (Republic of Ireland) John Burke
- (England) Leonard Crawley
- (England) John de Forest
- (England) Eric Fiddian
- (England) Lister Hartley
- (England) Rex Hartley
- (Scotland) Eric McRuvie
- (England) Bill Stout

== Thursday's foursomes ==
&	Results
R. Hartley/L. Hartley	(United States) 7 & 6	Sweetser/Voigt
Torrance/de Forest	(United States) 6 & 5	Moreland/Seaver
Stout/Burke	(United States) 7 & 6	Ouimet/Dunlap
Fiddian/McRuvie	(United States) 5 & 4	Moe/Howell
0	Foursomes	4
0	Overall	4

== Friday's singles ==
&	Results
Tony Torrance	halved	Francis Ouimet
Bill Stout	halved	Jess Sweetser
Rex Hartley	(United States) 2 & 1	Gus Moreland
Eric Fiddian	(United States) 7 & 6	Charlie Seaver
Leonard Crawley	(United Kingdom) (Republic of Ireland) 1 up	George Voigt
Lister Hartley	(United States) 3 & 2	Maurice McCarthy Jr
John Burke	halved	Jack Westland
Eric McRuvie	(United States) 10 & 9	George Dunlap
1	Singles	4
1	Overall	8
