= Eric Meeks =

American golfer (born 1965)

Personal information
- Nationality: United States
- Born: January 15, 1965 (age 61) San Bernardino, California, U.S.
- Height: 6 ft 0 in (1.83 m)
- Weight: 175 lb (79 kg; 12.5 st)

Career
- Sport: Golf
- College: University of Arizona
- Status: Professional
- Former tours: Nationwide Tour; Asian PGA Tour

Best results in major championships
- Masters Tournament: CUT: 1989
- PGA Championship: DNP
- U.S. Open: CUT: 1989, 1995
- The Open Championship: CUT: 1989

Eric Meeks (born January 15, 1965) is an American professional golfer.

Meeks won the 1988 U.S. Amateur. He played in the 1988 Eisenhower Trophy and in the 1989 Walker Cup match. He played his college golf for the Arizona Wildcats.

Meeks later turned professional and played on the Nike Tour/Nationwide Tour, where he had two runner-up finishes: 2001 Siouxland Open and 2002 Price Cutter Charity Championship. He also played on the Asian PGA Tour, finishing 8th on the Order of Merit in 1999.

== U.S. national team appearances ==
Amateur

- Eisenhower Trophy: 1988
- Walker Cup: 1989
