= 1936 Walker Cup =

Golf tournament

9th Walker Cup Match
- Dates: September 2–3, 1936
- Venue: Pine Valley Golf Club
- Location: Pine Valley, New Jersey
- Captains: Francis Ouimet (USA); William Tweddell (GB&I)
(United States)	9	0	(United Kingdom) (Republic of Ireland)
- United States wins the Walker Cup

The 1936 Walker Cup, the 9th Walker Cup Match, was played on September 2 and 3, 1936, at Pine Valley Golf Club, Pine Valley, New Jersey. The United States won by 9 matches to 0 with 3 matches halved.

== Format ==
Four 36-hole matches of foursomes were played on Wednesday and eight singles matches on Thursday. Each of the 12 matches was worth one point in the larger team competition. If a match was all square after the 36th hole extra holes were not played. The team with most points won the competition. If the two teams were tied, the previous winner would retain the trophy.

== Teams ==
The United States team of 11 was announced in April. Francis Ouimet was the captain and was given the option of whether to play himself or not. The day before the match started he announced that he had decided not to play, to give the younger players a chance and that all the other 10 members of the team would play in either the foursomes or the singles. Six members of the Great Britain and Ireland team were announced in late May, before the Amateur Championship. These were William Tweddell, the captain, Bentley, Langley, Lucas, McLean and Thomson. The remaining four were announced in early June. Tweddell did not select himself or Laddie Lucas for any of the matches. Lucas had recently had an attack of tonsilitis.

=== United States ===
Playing captain: Francis Ouimet

- Albert Campbell
- George Dunlap
- Walter Emery
- Johnny Fischer
- Harry Givan
- Johnny Goodman
- Reynolds Smith
- George Voigt
- Ed White
- Charlie Yates

=== Great Britain & Ireland ===
&
Playing captain: (England) William Tweddell

- (England) Harry Bentley
- (Scotland) Morton Dykes
- (Republic of Ireland) Cecil Ewing
- (England) Alec Hill
- (England) John Langley
- (England) Laddie Lucas
- (Scotland) Jack McLean
- (Scotland) Gordon Peters
- (Scotland) Hector Thomson

== Wednesday's foursomes ==
The American pair of Harry Givan and George Voigt were seven up on Alec Hill and Cecil Ewing after six holes of the second round and were still three up with four to play. However, Hill and Ewing won the next three holes to level the match after 17 holes and with the last hole halved in par fours the matches was halved.

&	Results
Thomson/Bentley	(United States) 7 & 5	Goodman/Campbell
McLean/Langley	(United States) 8 & 7	Smith/White
Peters/Dykes	halved	Yates/Emery
Hill/Ewing	halved	Givan/Voigt
0	Foursomes	2
0	Overall	2

== Thursday's singles ==
&	Results
Hector Thomson	(United States) 3 & 2	Johnny Goodman
Jack McLean	(United States) 5 & 4	Albert Campbell
Cecil Ewing	(United States) 8 & 7	Johnny Fischer
Alec Hill	(United States) 11 & 9	Reynolds Smith
Gordon Peters	(United States) 1 up	Walter Emery
Morton Dykes	(United States) 8 & 7	Charlie Yates
Harry Bentley	halved	George Dunlap
John Langley	(United States) 6 & 5	Ed White
0	Singles	7
0	Overall	9
