= 1930 Walker Cup =

Golf tournament

6th Walker Cup Match
- Dates: 15–16 May 1930
- Venue: Royal St George's Golf Club
- Location: Sandwich, Kent, England
- Captains: Roger Wethered (GB&I); Bobby Jones (USA)
(United Kingdom) (Republic of Ireland)	2	10	(United States)
- United States wins the Walker Cup

The 1930 Walker Cup, the 6th Walker Cup Match, was played on 15 and 16 May 1930, at Royal St George's Golf Club, Sandwich, Kent, England. The United States won by 10 matches to 2. The United States won three foursomes matches and seven of the singles matches.

== Format ==
Four 36-hole matches of foursomes were played on Thursday and eight singles matches on Friday. Each of the 12 matches was worth one point in the larger team competition. If a match was all square after the 36th hole extra holes were not played. The team with most points won the competition. If the two teams were tied, the previous winner would retain the trophy.

== Teams ==
The United States team of eight was announced in January, together with two reserves. The initial team included Jess Sweetser but he withdrew for business reasons in early April and was replaced by Roland MacKenzie. Maurice McCarthy became the first reserve but did not travel to the UK. Seven members of the Great Britain and Ireland team were selected in March, with Roger Wethered as captain. The last three members of the team, Campbell, Harris and Lang, were announced in mid-April. Great Britain and Ireland used the same eight players for the foursomes and singles. Harris and Lang being left out.

=== Great Britain & Ireland ===
&
Playing captain: (England) Roger Wethered

- (Scotland) William Campbell
- (Scotland) Robert Harris
- (England) Rex Hartley
- (England) Ernest Holderness
- (Scotland) Jack Lang
- (Scotland) John Nelson Smith
- (England) Bill Stout
- (England) Cyril Tolley
- (Scotland) Tony Torrance

=== United States ===
Playing captain: Bobby Jones

- Jimmy Johnston
- Roland MacKenzie
- Don Moe
- Francis Ouimet
- George Voigt
- George Von Elm
- Oscar Willing

== Thursday's foursomes ==
&	Results
Tolley/Wethered	(United Kingdom) (Republic of Ireland) 2 up	Von Elm/Voigt
Hartley/Torrance	(United States) 8 & 7	Willing/Jones
Holderness/Stout	(United States) 2 & 1	Moe/MacKenzie
Campbell/Smith	(United States) 2 & 1	Ouimet/Johnston
1	Foursomes	3
1	Overall	3

== Friday's singles ==
&	Results
Cyril Tolley	(United States) 5 & 4	Jimmy Johnston
Roger Wethered	(United States) 9 & 8	Bobby Jones
Rex Hartley	(United States) 3 & 2	George Von Elm
Ernest Holderness	(United States) 10 & 8	George Voigt
John Nelson Smith	(United States) 2 & 1	Oscar Willing
Tony Torrance	(United Kingdom) (Republic of Ireland) 7 & 6	Francis Ouimet
Bill Stout	(United States) 1 up	Don Moe
William Campbell	(United States) 6 & 5	Roland MacKenzie
1	Singles	7
2	Overall	10
