= 1977 Walker Cup =

Golf tournament

26th Walker Cup Match
- Dates: August 26–27, 1977
- Venue: Shinnecock Hills Golf Club
- Location: Southampton, New York
- Captains: Lewis Oehmig (USA); Sandy Saddler (GB&I)
(United States)	16	8	(United Kingdom) (Republic of Ireland)
- United States wins the Walker Cup

The 1977 Walker Cup, the 26th Walker Cup Match, was played on August 26 and 27, 1977, at Shinnecock Hills Golf Club, Southampton, New York. The event was won by the United States 16 to 8.

The United States led 9–3 after the first day and 11–5 after the second-day foursomes. Needing just a point to retain the trophy, the United States won 5 of the 8 singles matches for a convincing victory. There were no halved matches, although 8 matches went to the last hole.

== Format ==
The format for play on Friday and Saturday was the same. There were four matches of foursomes in the morning and eight singles matches in the afternoon. In all, 24 matches were played.

Each of the 24 matches was worth one point in the larger team competition. If a match was all square after the 18th hole extra holes were not played. Rather, each side earned ½ a point toward their team total. The team that accumulated at least 12½ points won the competition. If the two teams were tied, the previous winner would retain the trophy.

== Teams ==
Ten players for the United States and Great Britain & Ireland participated in the event plus one non-playing captain for each team.

=== United States ===
Captain: Lewis Oehmig

- Mike Brannan
- John Fought
- Gary Hallberg
- Vance Heafner
- Lindy Miller
- Fred Ridley
- Bill Sander
- Dick Siderowf
- Jay Sigel
- Scott Simpson

=== Great Britain & Ireland ===
&
Captain: (Scotland) Sandy Saddler

- (Scotland) Allan Brodie
- (England) John Davies
- (England) Peter Deeble
- (Scotland) Ian Hutcheon
- (England) Michael Kelley
- (England) Sandy Lyle
- (Scotland) Steve Martin
- (England) Peter McEvoy
- (Scotland) Paul McKellar
- (Scotland) Gordon Murray

== Friday's matches ==
=== Morning foursomes ===
&	Results
Lyle/McEvoy	(United States) 4 & 3	Fought/Heafner
Davies/Kelley	(United States) 5 & 4	Simpson/Miller
Hutcheon/Deeble	(United Kingdom) (Republic of Ireland) 1 up	Siderowf/Hallberg
Brodie/Martin	(United States) 1 up	Sigel/Brannan
1	Foursomes	3
1	Overall	3

=== Afternoon singles ===
&	Results
Peter McEvoy	(United States) 2 up	Lindy Miller
Ian Hutcheon	(United States) 4 & 3	John Fought
Gordon Murray	(United States) 7 & 6	Scott Simpson
John Davies	(United States) 4 & 3	Vance Heafner
Allan Brodie	(United Kingdom) (Republic of Ireland) 4 & 3	Bill Sander
Steve Martin	(United Kingdom) (Republic of Ireland) 3 & 2	Gary Hallberg
Sandy Lyle	(United States) 2 up	Fred Ridley
Paul McKellar	(United States) 5 & 4	Jay Sigel
2	Singles	6
3	Overall	9

== Saturday's matches ==
=== Morning foursomes ===
&	Results
Hutcheon/Deeble	(United States) 4 & 3	Fought/Heafner
McEvoy/Davies	(United States) 2 up	Miller/Simpson
Brodie/Martin	(United Kingdom) (Republic of Ireland) 6 & 4	Siderowf/Sander
Murray/Kelley	(United Kingdom) (Republic of Ireland) 4 & 3	Ridley/Brannan
2	Foursomes	2
5	Overall	11

=== Afternoon singles ===
&	Results
Steve Martin	(United States) 1 up	Lindy Miller
John Davies	(United States) 2 & 1	John Fought
Allan Brodie	(United Kingdom) (Republic of Ireland) 2 & 1	Bill Sander
Peter McEvoy	(United States) 4 & 3	Gary Hallberg
Michael Kelley	(United Kingdom) (Republic of Ireland) 2 & 1	Dick Siderowf
Ian Hutcheon	(United Kingdom) (Republic of Ireland) 2 up	Mike Brannan
Sandy Lyle	(United States) 5 & 3	Fred Ridley
Peter Deeble	(United States) 1 up	Jay Sigel
3	Singles	5
8	Overall	16
