= 1963 Walker Cup =

Golf tournament

19th Walker Cup Match
- Dates: 24–25 May 1963
- Venue: Turnberry
- Location: Ayrshire, Scotland
- Captains: Charles Lawrie (GB&I); Richard Tufts (USA)
(United Kingdom) (Republic of Ireland)	8	12	(United States)
- United States wins the Walker Cup

The 1963 Walker Cup, the 19th Walker Cup Match, was played on 24 and 25 May 1963, at Turnberry, Ayrshire, Scotland. The event was won by the United States 12 to 8 with 4 matches halved. This was the first Walker Cup in which 18-hole matches were played.

Great Britain and Ireland took a 6 to 3 lead on the first day after Billy Joe Patton was the only singles winner for the United States. However, the United States won all four foursomes matches on the second morning and five of the singles in the afternoon.

== Format ==
The format for play on Friday and Saturday was the same. There were four matches of foursomes in the morning and eight singles matches in the afternoon. In all, 24 matches were played.

Each of the 24 matches was worth one point in the larger team competition. If a match was all square after the 18th hole extra holes were not played. The team with most points won the competition. If the two teams were tied, the previous winner would retain the trophy.

== Teams ==
Ten players for the United States and Great Britain & Ireland participated in the event plus one non-playing captain for each team.

=== Great Britain & Ireland ===
&
Captain: (Scotland) Charles Lawrie

- (England) Michael Bonallack
- (Republic of Ireland) Joe Carr
- (England) Martin Christmas
- (Scotland) Charlie Green
- (England) Michael Lunt
- (Republic of Ireland) David Madeley
- (Scotland) Stuart Murray
- (Scotland) Sandy Saddler
- (Scotland) Ronnie Shade
- (Republic of Ireland) David Sheahan

=== United States ===
Captain: Richard Tufts

- Deane Beman
- Charles Coe
- Richard Davies
- Robert W. Gardner
- Downing Gray
- Labron Harris Jr.
- Billy Joe Patton
- R. H. Sikes
- Charlie Smith
- Ed Updegraff

== Friday's matches ==
=== Morning foursomes ===
&	Results
Bonallack/Murray	(United Kingdom) (Republic of Ireland) 4 & 3	Patton/Sikes
Carr/Green	(United States) 2 up	Gray/Harris
Lunt/Sheahan	(United States) 5 & 3	Beman/Coe
Madeley/Shade	halved	Gardner/Updegraff
1	Foursomes	2
1	Overall	2

=== Afternoon singles ===
&	Results
Stuart Murray	(United Kingdom) (Republic of Ireland) 3 & 1	Deane Beman
Martin Christmas	(United States) 3 & 2	Billy Joe Patton
Joe Carr	(United Kingdom) (Republic of Ireland) 7 & 5	R. H. Sikes
David Sheahan	(United Kingdom) (Republic of Ireland) 1 up	Labron Harris Jr
Michael Bonallack	(United Kingdom) (Republic of Ireland) 1 up	Richard Davies
Sandy Saddler	halved	Charles Coe
Ronnie Shade	(United Kingdom) (Republic of Ireland) 4 & 3	Downing Gray
Michael Lunt	halved	Charlie Smith
5	Singles	1
6	Overall	3

== Saturday's matches ==
=== Morning foursomes ===
&	Results
Bonallack/Murray	(United States) 1 up	Patton/Sikes
Lunt/Sheahan	(United States) 3 & 2	Gray/Harris
Green/Saddler	(United States) 3 & 1	Gardner/Updegraff
Madeley/Shade	(United States) 3 & 2	Beman/Coe
0	Foursomes	4
6	Overall	7

=== Afternoon singles ===
&	Results
Stuart Murray	(United States) 3 & 2	Billy Joe Patton
David Sheahan	(United Kingdom) (Republic of Ireland) 1 up	Richard Davies
Joe Carr	(United States) 4 & 3	Ed Updegraff
Michael Bonallack	(United States) 3 & 2	Labron Harris Jr
Michael Lunt	(United States) 3 & 2	Robert Gardner
Sandy Saddler	halved	Deane Beman
Ronnie Shade	(United Kingdom) (Republic of Ireland) 2 & 1	Downing Gray
Charlie Green	(United States) 4 & 3	Charles Coe
2	Singles	5
8	Overall	12
