= 1975 Walker Cup =

Golf tournament

25th Walker Cup Match
- Dates: 28–29 May 1975
- Venue: Old Course at St Andrews
- Location: St Andrews, Scotland
- Captains: David Marsh (GB&I); Ed Updegraff (USA)
(United Kingdom) (Republic of Ireland)	8½	15½	(United States)
- United States wins the Walker Cup

The 1975 Walker Cup, the 25th Walker Cup Match, was played on 28 and 29 May 1975, on the Old Course at St Andrews, Scotland. The event was won by the United States 15½ to 8½.

== Format ==
The format for play on Wednesday and Thursday was the same. There were four matches of foursomes in the morning and eight singles matches in the afternoon. In all, 24 matches were played.

Each of the 24 matches was worth one point in the larger team competition. If a match was all square after the 18th hole extra holes were not played. Rather, each side earned ½ a point toward their team total. The team that accumulated at least 12½ points won the competition. If the two teams were tied, the previous winner would retain the trophy.

== Teams ==
Ten players for the United States and Great Britain & Ireland participated in the event plus one non-playing captain for each team.

=== Great Britain & Ireland ===
&
Captain: (England) David Marsh

- (England) John Davies
- (England) Richard Eyles
- (Scotland) Charlie Green
- (England) Peter Hedges
- (Scotland) Ian Hutcheon
- (England) Mark James
- (Scotland) George Macgregor
- (Republic of Ireland) Pat Mulcare
- (England) Martin Poxon
- (Scotland) Hugh Stuart

=== United States ===
Captain: Ed Updegraff

- George Burns
- William C. Campbell
- Vinny Giles
- John Grace
- Jay Haas
- Gary Koch
- Jerry Pate
- Dick Siderowf
- Craig Stadler
- Curtis Strange

== Wednesday's matches ==
=== Morning foursomes ===
&	Results
James/Eyles	(United Kingdom) (Republic of Ireland) 1 up	Pate/Siderowf
Davies/Poxon	(United States) 5 & 4	Burns/Stadler
Green/Stuart	(United States) 2 & 1	Haas/Strange
Macgregor/Hutcheon	(United States) 5 & 4	Giles/Koch
1	Foursomes	3
1	Overall	3

=== Afternoon singles ===
&	Results
Mark James	(United Kingdom) (Republic of Ireland) 2 & 1	Jerry Pate
John Davies	halved	Curtis Strange
Pat Mulcare	(United Kingdom) (Republic of Ireland) 1 up	Dick Siderowf
Hugh Stuart	(United States) 3 & 2	Gary Koch
Martin Poxon	(United States) 3 & 1	John Grace
Ian Hutcheon	halved	William C. Campbell
Richard Eyles	(United States) 2 & 1	Jay Haas
George Macgregor	(United States) 3 & 2	Vinny Giles
3	Singles	5
4	Overall	8

== Thursday's matches ==
=== Morning foursomes ===
&	Results
Mulcare/Hutcheon	(United Kingdom) (Republic of Ireland) 1 up	Pate/Siderowf
James/Eyles	(United Kingdom) (Republic of Ireland) 5 & 3	Campbell/Grace
Green/Stuart	(United States) 1 up	Burns/Stadler
Hedges/Davies	(United States) 3 & 2	Haas/Strange
2	Foursomes	2
6	Overall	10

=== Afternoon singles ===
&	Results
Ian Hutcheon	(United Kingdom) (Republic of Ireland) 3 & 2	Jerry Pate
Pat Mulcare	(United States) 4 & 3	Curtis Strange
Mark James	(United States) 5 & 4	Gary Koch
John Davies	(United Kingdom) (Republic of Ireland) 2 & 1	George Burns
Charlie Green	(United States) 2 & 1	John Grace
George Macgregor	(United States) 3 & 2	Craig Stadler
Richard Eyles	(United States) 2 & 1	William C. Campbell
Peter Hedges	halved	Vinny Giles
2½	Singles	5½
8½	Overall	15½
