= Kris Cox =

American professional golfer (born 1973)

Personal information
- Nationality: United States
- Born: October 22, 1973 (age 53) Lafayette, Louisiana, U.S.
- Height: 5 ft 11 in (1.80 m)
- Weight: 200 lb (91 kg; 14 st)

Career
- Sport: Golf
- College: Oklahoma State University
- Turned professional: 1996
- Former tours: PGA Tour; Nationwide Tour; NGA Hooters Tour
- Professional wins: 4

Number of wins by tour
- Korn Ferry Tour: 1
- Other: 3

Best results in major championships
- Masters Tournament: DNP
- PGA Championship: DNP
- U.S. Open: T48: 2004
- The Open Championship: DNP

Kris Cox (born October 22, 1973) is an American professional golfer.

== Early life and amateur career ==
Cox was born in Lafayette, Louisiana. He played college golf at Oklahoma State University where he was a three-time All-American. He won three events at OSU, including the 1996 Big Eight Conference Championship. His team also won the 1995 NCAA Championship. Also as an amateur, Cox was a semi-finalist in 1994 U.S. Amateur and played on the 1995 Walker Cup team.

== Professional career ==
In 1996, Cox turned professional. He played on the PGA Tour's developmental tour in 1999, 2000, 2005, 2007, and 2009, winning once at the 2005 Permian Basin Charity Golf Classic. He played on the PGA Tour in 2004, 2006, and 2007 where his best finish was T-3 at the 2006 FedEx St. Jude Classic.

== Professional wins (4) ==
=== Nationwide Tour wins (1) ===
No.	Date	Tournament	Winning score	Margin of victory	Runners-up
1	Oct 16, 2005	Permian Basin Charity Golf Classic	−18 (69-65-68-68=270)	2 strokes	(United States) Craig Bowden, (United States) Jerry Smith, (United States) Chris Tidland

=== NGA Hooters Tour wins (2) ===
No.	Date	Tournament	Winning score	Margin of victory	Runner-up
1	Apr 29, 2001	Arkansas Michelob Light Classic	−22 (69-65-65-67=266)	3 strokes	(United States) David Howser
2	May 6, 2001	Louisiana Michelob Light Classic	−12 (65-72-70-69=276)	5 strokes	(United States) Steve Pope

=== Other wins (1) ===
- 1997 Texas State Open

== U.S. national team appearances ==
Amateur

- Walker Cup: 1995

== See also ==
- 2003 PGA Tour Qualifying School graduates
- 2005 Nationwide Tour graduates
