= Ed Updegraff =

American golfer and urologist (1922–2022)

Personal information
- Full name: Edgar Rice Updegraff
- Nationality: United States
- Born: March 1, 1922 Boone, Iowa, U.S.
- Died: December 23, 2022 (aged 100) Saddlebrooke, Arizona, U.S.

Career
- Sport: Golf
- Status: Amateur

Best results in major championships
- Masters Tournament: T44: 1966
- PGA Championship: DNP
- U.S. Open: DNP
- The Open Championship: DNP
- U.S. Amateur: 7th: 1969
- British Amateur: T3: 1963

Achievements and awards
- Bob Jones Award: 1999

Edgar Rice Updegraff (March 1, 1922 – December 23, 2022) was an American amateur golfer and urologist.

== Biography ==
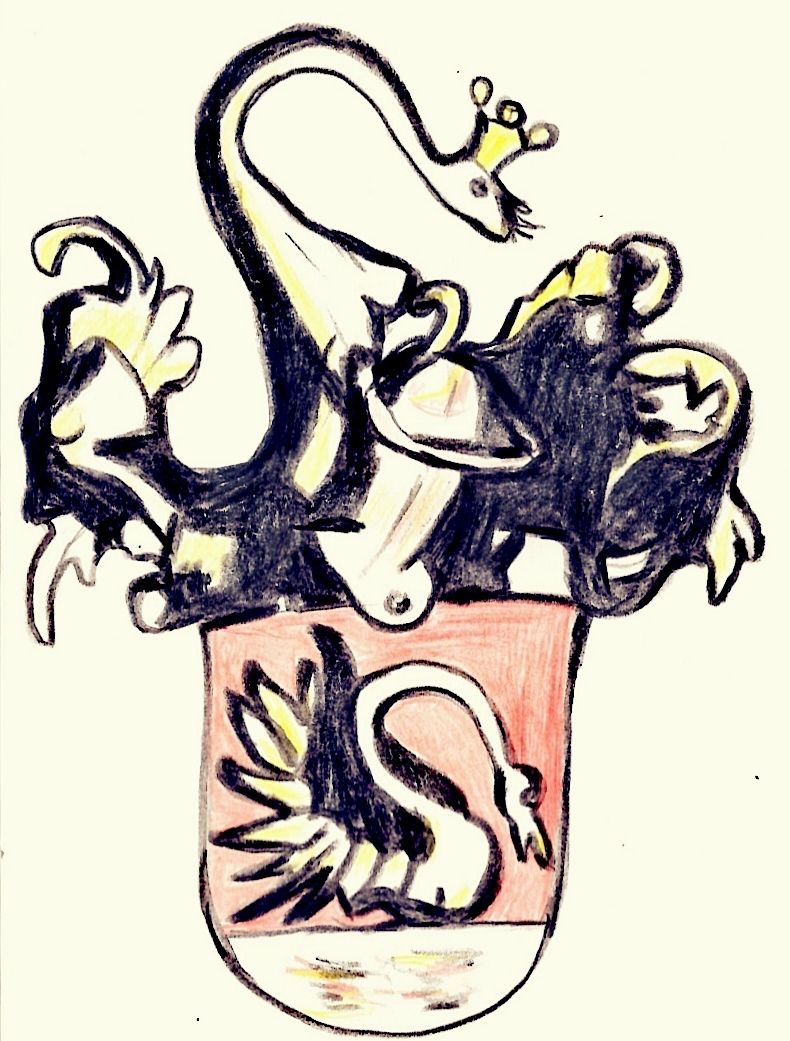
Possible, but not proven coat of arms Op den Graeff as descendants of Herman op den Graeff (Heraldic representation by Matthias Laurenz Gräff based on the Krefeld Op den Graeff stained glass window from 1630, which may depict the “Lohengrin swan” of the Kleve coat of arms in one window)

Updegraff was born in Boone, Iowa, and is a descendant of the Dutch and German Op den Graeff family. He was a direct descendant of Herman op den Graeff, mennonite leader of Krefeld, and his grandson Abraham op den Graeff, one of the founders of Germantown and in 1688 signer of the first protest against slavery in colonial America.

=== Medical career ===
He received his bachelor's and master's degrees from the Iowa State University and his medical degree from the University of Iowa. Unlike his father and brothers, who were otolaryngologists, Updegraff chose urology as a specialty. He eventually settled into practice in Tucson, Arizona, in 1951, partially because of the opportunity to continue playing golf there.

=== Sporting career ===
Updegraff had a long amateur career, winning many tournaments on a local, state, and national scale, including the Western Amateur (1957, 1959), Sunnehanna Amateur (1962), Pacific Coast Amateur (1967), and U.S. Senior Amateur (1981). He was a semi-finalist at 1963 British Amateur. He played on three winning Walker Cup teams (1963, 1965, 1969) and captained the 1975 team to a win. He also finished in a tie for 4th place at the 1969 Tucson Open on the PGA Tour but failed to sign his scorecard and was disqualified.

Updegraff received the Bob Jones Award from the United States Golf Association in 1999. He was inducted into the Arizona Golf Hall of Fame in 1969 and the Iowa Golf Association Hall of Fame in 2006.

As of June 2021, Updegraff lived at Saddlebrooke Ranch. He turned 100 in March 2022, and died on December 23, 2022, in Saddlebrooke, Arizona.

== Amateur wins ==
- 1940 Northwest Amateur
- 1941 Northwest Amateur
- 1947 Northwest Amateur
- 1952 Arizona Amateur
- 1954 Southwestern Amateur
- 1955 Southwestern Amateur, Arizona Amateur
- 1957 Western Amateur
- 1959 Western Amateur
- 1961 Southwestern Amateur, Arizona Amateur
- 1962 Sunnehanna Amateur
- 1967 Pacific Coast Amateur
- 1969 Southwestern Amateur, Arizona Amateur
- 1981 U.S. Senior Amateur

== U.S. national team appearances ==
- Walker Cup: 1963 (winners), 1965 (tied, cup retained), 1969 (winners), 1975 (winners, non-playing captain)
- Americas Cup: 1963 (winners), 1967 (winners, non-playing captain)

== See also ==
- List of male golfers
