= Max Marston =

American golfer (1892–1949)

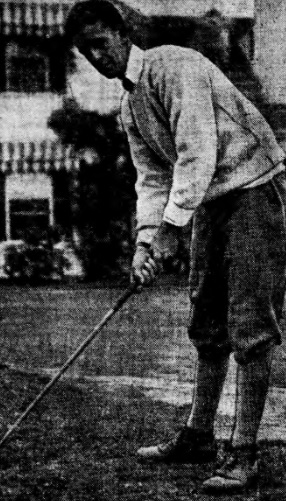
- Marston, 1916

Personal information
- Full name: Maxwell Rolston Marston
- Nationality: United States
- Born: June 12, 1892 Buffalo, New York, U.S.
- Died: May 7, 1949 (aged 56) Old Lyme, Connecticut, U.S.

Career
- Sport: Golf
- Status: Amateur

Best results in major championships (wins: 1)
- Masters Tournament: DNP
- PGA Championship: DNP
- U.S. Open: T19: 1915
- The Open Championship: DNP
- U.S. Amateur: Won: 1923
- British Amateur: T33: 1923

Maxwell Rolston Marston (June 12, 1892 – May 7, 1949) was an American amateur golfer.

== Career ==
He worked as an investment banker in Philadelphia. He was a member of the Cranford Golf Club in Cranford, New Jersey and lived on Central Avenue in the town.

At the 1923 U.S. Amateur at Flossmoor Country Club, Marston defeated three former or future Amateur champions: Bobby Jones (1924, 1925, 1927, 1928, 1930), Francis Ouimet (1914, 1931), and Jess Sweetser (1922) in the final (38th hole). He reached the final again in 1933, losing to George Dunlap, 6 and 5. Marston, who took lessons from James Maiden, also won the New Jersey Amateur twice and the Pennsylvania Amateur three times.

Marston played on the first three Walker Cup teams and again in 1934.

He is the namesake of the annual Marston Cup, a tournament for golfers between 40 and 54 years old and is run by the Golf Association of Philadelphia.

== Death ==
Marston died on May 7, 1949, in Old Lyme, Connecticut, aged 56.

== Amateur wins ==
Note: This list may be incomplete.

- 1915 New Jersey Amateur
- 1919 New Jersey Amateur
- 1921 Pennsylvania Amateur
- 1922 Pennsylvania Amateur
- 1923 **U.S. Amateur**, Pennsylvania Amateur

Amateur majors shown in bold.

== U.S. national team appearances ==
- Walker Cup: 1922 (winners), 1923 (winners), 1924 (winners), 1934 (winners)
