= Johnny Fischer =

American golfer (1912–1984)

- Fischer in 1934

Personal information
- Full name: John W. Fischer
- Nationality: United States
- Born: March 10, 1912 Cincinnati, Ohio, U.S.
- Died: May 25, 1984 (aged 72)

Career
- Sport: Golf
- Status: Amateur

Best results in major championships (wins: 1)
- Masters Tournament: DNP
- PGA Championship: DNP
- U.S. Open: T27: 1932
- The Open Championship: DNP
- U.S. Amateur: Won: 1936
- British Amateur: T33: 1934

John W. Fischer (March 10, 1912 – May 25, 1984) was an American amateur golfer in the 1930s.

== Career ==
Fischer was born in Cincinnati, Ohio in 1912. He won the 1932 NCAA individual golf championship and the Big Ten Conference individual championship in 1932, 1933 and 1935 while playing at the University of Michigan. He also won the 1936 U.S. Amateur.

Fischer played on the Walker Cup team in 1934, 1936, and 1938, and captained the team in 1965.

== Awards and honors ==
In 1980, Fischer was inducted into the University of Michigan Athletic Hall of Honor.

== Tournament wins ==
this list may be incomplete

- 1932 NCAA Championship
- 1932 Big Ten Championship
- 1933 Big Ten Championship
- 1935 Big Ten Championship
- 1936 U.S. Amateur

== Major championships ==
=== Amateur wins (1) ===
Year	Championship	Winning score	Runner-up
1936	U.S. Amateur	37 holes	(Scotland) Jack McLean

=== Results timeline ===
Tournament	1931	1932	1933	1934	1935	1936	1937	1938	1939	1940	1941	1942	1943	1944	1945	1946
U.S. Open		T27	T43									NT	NT	NT	NT	
U.S. Amateur	DNQ	QF M	R16 M	R128	R128	1	SF		R32	QF	R64	NT	NT	NT	NT	DNQ
British Amateur				R64				R256		NT	NT	NT	NT	NT	NT	

Win
Top 10
Did not play

M = Medalist
NT = No tournament
DNQ = Did not qualify for match play portion
R128, R64, R32, R16, QF, SF = Round in which player lost in match play
"T" indicates a tie for a place

Source for U.S. Open and U.S. Amateur: USGA Championship Database

Source for 1934 British Amateur: The Glasgow Herald, May 24, 1934, pg. 12.

Source for 1938 British Amateur: The Glasgow Herald, May 25, 1938, pg. 21.

== U.S. national team appearances ==
Amateur

- Walker Cup: 1934 (winners), 1936 (winners), 1938, 1965 (non-playing captain, tied, cup retained)
