= 1981 Walker Cup =

Golf tournament

28th Walker Cup Match
- Dates: August 28–29, 1981
- Venue: Cypress Point Club
- Location: Pebble Beach, California
- Captains: Jim Gabrielsen (USA); Rodney Foster (GB&I)
(United States)	15	9	(United Kingdom) (Republic of Ireland)
- United States wins the Walker Cup

The 1981 Walker Cup, the 28th Walker Cup Match, was played on August 28 and 29, 1981, at Cypress Point Club, Pebble Beach, California. The event was won by the United States 15 to 9.

The United States led 8–4 after the first day but Great Britain and Ireland won 3 of the 4 second-day foursomes to reduce the American lead to 9–7. Although Roger Chapman beat Hal Sutton in the top singles match, the United States won 5 and halved the other 2 of the remaining 7 matches for a comfortable victory.

== Format ==
The format for play on Friday and Saturday was the same. There were four matches of foursomes in the morning and eight singles matches in the afternoon. In all, 24 matches were played.

Each of the 24 matches was worth one point in the larger team competition. If a match was all square after the 18th hole extra holes were not played. Rather, each side earned ½ a point toward their team total. The team that accumulated at least 12½ points won the competition. If the two teams were tied, the previous winner would retain the trophy.

== Teams ==
Ten players for the United States and Great Britain & Ireland participated in the event plus one non-playing captain for each team.

=== United States ===
Captain: Jim Gabrielsen

- Ron Commans
- Frank Fuhrer III
- Jim Holtgrieve
- Bob Lewis
- Jodie Mudd
- Corey Pavin
- Joey Rassett
- Jay Sigel
- Hal Sutton
- Dick von Tacky

=== Great Britain & Ireland ===
&
Captain: (England) Rodney Foster

- (England) Roger Chapman
- (Scotland) Colin Dalgleish
- (England) Peter Deeble
- (Wales) Duncan Evans
- (England) Geoffrey Godwin
- (Scotland) Ian Hutcheon
- (England) Peter McEvoy
- (Republic of Ireland) Ronan Rafferty
- (Republic of Ireland) Philip Walton
- (England) Paul Way

== Friday's matches ==
=== Morning foursomes ===
&	Results
Walton/Rafferty	(United Kingdom) (Republic of Ireland) 4 & 2	Sutton/Sigel
Chapman/McEvoy	(United States) 1 up	Holtgrieve/Fuhrer
Deeble/Hutcheon	(United States) 2 & 1	Lewis/von Tacky
Evans/Way	(United States) 5 & 4	Commans/Pavin
1	Foursomes	3
1	Overall	3

=== Afternoon singles ===
&	Results
Ronan Rafferty	(United States) 3 & 1	Hal Sutton
Colin Dalgleish	(United States) 1 up	Joey Rassett
Philip Walton	(United Kingdom) (Republic of Ireland) 1 up	Ron Commans
Roger Chapman	(United Kingdom) (Republic of Ireland) 2 & 1	Bob Lewis
Geoffrey Godwin	(United States) 1 up	Jodie Mudd
Ian Hutcheon	(United States) 4 & 3	Corey Pavin
Paul Way	(United Kingdom) (Republic of Ireland) 3 & 1	Dick von Tacky
Peter McEvoy	(United States) 4 & 2	Jay Sigel
3	Singles	5
4	Overall	8

== Saturday's matches ==
=== Morning foursomes ===
&	Results
Chapman/Way	(United Kingdom) (Republic of Ireland) 1 up	Sutton/Sigel
Walton/Rafferty	(United Kingdom) (Republic of Ireland) 6 & 4	Holtgrieve/Fuhrer
Evans/Dalgleish	(United Kingdom) (Republic of Ireland) 3 & 2	Lewis/von Tacky
Hutcheon/Godwin	(United States) 5 & 4	Rassett/Mudd
3	Foursomes	1
7	Overall	9

=== Afternoon singles ===
&	Results
Roger Chapman	(United Kingdom) (Republic of Ireland) 1 up	Hal Sutton
Ronan Rafferty	(United States) 2 & 1	Jim Holtgrieve
Philip Walton	(United States) 4 & 2	Frank Fuhrer III
Paul Way	(United States) 6 & 5	Jay Sigel
Colin Dalgleish	(United States) 7 & 5	Jodie Mudd
Geoffrey Godwin	halved	Ron Commans
Peter Deeble	(United States) 4 & 3	Joey Rassett
Duncan Evans	halved	Corey Pavin
2	Singles	6
9	Overall	15
