= Jim Holtgrieve =

American golfer (born 1947)

Personal information
- Full name: James M. Holtgrieve
- Nationality: United States
- Born: December 26, 1947 (age 78) St. Louis, Missouri
- Height: 5 ft 10 in (1.78 m)
- Weight: 195 lb (88 kg; 13.9 st)

Career
- Sport: Golf
- College: University of Missouri; Washburn University
- Turned professional: 1998 re-instated amateur 2007
- Former tour: Champions Tour (1999-2003)

Best results in major championships
- Masters Tournament: T41: 1982
- PGA Championship: DNP
- U.S. Open: T57: 1978
- The Open Championship: DNP

James M. Holtgrieve (born December 26, 1947) is an American amateur golfer who had a brief professional career.

== Early life ==
Holtgrieve was born in St. Louis, Missouri. He attended the University of Missouri and Washburn University.

== Amateur career ==
Holtgrieve had the most success as an amateur golfer, winning the inaugural U.S. Mid-Amateur in 1981, finishing runner-up in the 1983 British Amateur, and losing in the semi-finals of the 1980 U.S. Amateur. He played on three winning Walker Cup teams (1979, 1981, and 1983) and captained the U.S. team in 2011 and 2013. He played on the winning U.S. team in the Eisenhower Trophy in 1980 and 1982.

== Professional career ==
Holtgrieve turned professional in 1998 and began playing on the Champions Tour. His best finish on tour was a T-2nd at The Home Depot Invitational in 1999.

== Re-instated amateur status ==
In 2007, Holtgrieve had his amateur status reinstated by the USGA.

== Results in major championships ==
Tournament	1978	1979	1980	1981	1982	1983	1984
Masters Tournament			T44	47	T41	CUT	CUT
U.S. Open	T57						

Note: Holtgrieve only played in the Masters and the U.S. Open.

Did not play

CUT = missed the half-way cut
"T" = tied

== U.S. national team appearances ==
Amateur

- Walker Cup: 1979 (winners), 1981 (winners), 1983 (winners), 2011 (non-playing captain), 2013 (non-playing captain)
- Eisenhower Trophy: 1980 (winners), 1982 (winners)
