= George Dunlap (golfer) =

American amateur golfer

Personal information
- Full name: George T. Dunlap Jr.
- Nationality: United States
- Born: December 23, 1908 Arlington, New Jersey, U.S.
- Died: November 24, 2003 (aged 94) Naples, Florida, U.S.

Career
- Sport: Golf
- College: Princeton University
- Status: Amateur

Best results in major championships (wins: 1)
- Masters Tournament: T34: 1934
- PGA Championship: DNP
- U.S. Open: DNP
- The Open Championship: T35: 1933
- U.S. Amateur: Won: 1933
- British Amateur: T3: 1933, 1934

George T. Dunlap Jr. (December 23, 1908 – November 24, 2003) was an American amateur golfer best known for winning the U.S. Amateur.

== Early life ==
Dunlap was born in the Arlington section of Kearny, New Jersey. His father was the co-founder of Grosset & Dunlap Publishers.

== Golf career ==
Dunlap graduated from Princeton University in 1931. He won the Intercollegiate Individual Championship in 1930 and 1931 and led Princeton to the team victory in 1930.

Dunlap won the U.S. Amateur in 1933 and also won seven North and South Amateurs from 1931 to 1942 including four in a row (1933–36).

Dunlap played on three winning Walker Cup teams; 1932, 1934, and 1936.

== Death ==
Dunlap died in Naples, Florida.

== Tournament wins (12) ==
- 1930 Intercollegiate Individual Championship
- 1931 Intercollegiate Individual Championship, North and South Amateur
- 1932 Long Island Amateur
- 1933 U.S. Amateur, North and South Amateur
- 1934 North and South Amateur
- 1935 North and South Amateur
- 1936 North and South Amateur, Metropolitan Amateur
- 1940 North and South Amateur
- 1942 North and South Amateur

== Major championships ==
=== Amateur wins (1) ===
| Year | Championship | Winning score | Runner-up |
|---|---|---|---|
| 1933 | U.S. Amateur | 6 & 5 | (United States) Max Marston |

=== Results timeline ===
| Tournament | 1928 | 1929 | 1930 | 1931 | 1932 | 1933 | 1934 | 1935 | 1936 |
|---|---|---|---|---|---|---|---|---|---|
| Masters Tournament | NYF | NYF | NYF | NYF | NYF | NYF | T34 | | |
| The Open Championship | | | | | | T35 | | | |
| U.S. Amateur | R16 | | R32 | R16 | | 1 | R64 | R128 | R32 |
| The Amateur Championship | | | | | | SF | SF | | |

Win
Top 10
Did not play

NYF = Tournament not yet founded
"T" indicates a tie for a place
DNQ = Did not qualify for match play portion
R256, R128, R64, R32, R16, QF, SF = Round in which player lost in match play

Source for U.S. Amateur: USGA Championship Database

Source for 1933 British Open: www.opengolf.com

Source for 1933 British Amateur: The Glasgow Herald, June 24, 1933, pg. 11.

Source for 1934 Masters: www.masters.com

Source for 1934 British Amateur: The American Golfer, July, 1934, pg. 16.

== U.S. national team appearances ==
- Walker Cup: 1932 (winners), 1934 (winners), 1936 (winners)
