= 1967 Walker Cup =

Golf tournament

21st Walker Cup Match
- Dates: 19–20 May 1967
- Venue: Royal St George's Golf Club
- Location: Sandwich, Kent, England
- Captains: Joe Carr (GB&I); Jess Sweetser (USA)
(United Kingdom) (Republic of Ireland)	7	13	(United States)
- United States wins the Walker Cup

The 1967 Walker Cup, the 21st Walker Cup Match, was played on 19 and 20 May 1967, at Royal St George's Golf Club, Sandwich, Kent, England. The event was won by the United States 13 to 7 with 4 matches halved.

The United States took an 8 to 1 lead on the first day. Great Britain and Ireland did much better on the second day, winning the morning foursomes. Needing just two wins in the afternoon singles, the United States won four and halved another for a convincing victory.

== Format ==
The format for play on Friday and Saturday was the same. There were four matches of foursomes in the morning and eight singles matches in the afternoon. In all, 24 matches were played.

Each of the 24 matches was worth one point in the larger team competition. If a match was all square after the 18th hole extra holes were not played. The team with most points won the competition. If the two teams were tied, the previous winner would retain the trophy.

== Teams ==
Ten players for the United States and Great Britain & Ireland participated in the event. Great Britain & Ireland had a playing captain, while the United States had a non-playing captain.

=== Great Britain & Ireland ===
&
Playing captain: (Republic of Ireland) Joe Carr

- (England) Michael Attenborough
- (England) Michael Bonallack
- (Republic of Ireland) Tom Craddock
- (England) Rodney Foster
- (England) Dudley Millensted
- (England) Peter Oosterhuis
- (Scotland) Sandy Pirie
- (Scotland) Sandy Saddler
- (Scotland) Ronnie Shade

=== United States ===
Captain: Jess Sweetser

- Don Allen
- William C. Campbell
- Ron Cerrudo
- Bob Dickson
- Marty Fleckman
- Jimmy Grant
- Downing Gray
- Jack Lewis Jr.
- Bob Murphy
- Ed Tutwiler

== Friday's matches ==
=== Morning foursomes ===
&	Results
Shade/Oosterhuis	halved	Murphy/Cerrudo
Foster/Saddler	(United States) 1 up	Campbell/Lewis
Bonallack/Attenborough	(United States) 4 & 2	Gray/Tutwiler
Carr/Craddock	(United States) 3 & 1	Dickson/Grant
0	Foursomes	3
0	Overall	3

=== Afternoon singles ===
&	Results
Ronnie Shade	(United States) 2 & 1	William C. Campbell
Rodney Foster	(United States) 2 & 1	Bob Murphy
Michael Bonallack	halved	Downing Gray
Michael Attenborough	(United States) 4 & 3	Ron Cerrudo
Peter Oosterhuis	(United States) 6 & 4	Bob Dickson
Tom Craddock	(United States) 2 & 1	Jack Lewis Jr
Sandy Pirie	halved	Don Allen
Sandy Saddler	(United Kingdom) (Republic of Ireland) 3 & 2	Marty Fleckman
1	Singles	5
1	Overall	8

== Saturday's matches ==
=== Morning foursomes ===
&	Results
Bonnallack/Craddock	(United Kingdom) (Republic of Ireland) 2 up	Murphy/Cerrudo
Saddler/Pirie	(United States) 1 up	Campbell/Lewis
Shade/Oosterhuis	(United Kingdom) (Republic of Ireland) 3 & 1	Gray/Tutwiler
Foster/Millensted	(United Kingdom) (Republic of Ireland) 2 & 1	Allen/Fleckman
3	Foursomes	1
4	Overall	9

=== Afternoon singles ===
&	Results
Ronnie Shade	(United States) 3 & 2	William C. Campbell
Michael Bonallack	(United Kingdom) (Republic of Ireland) 4 & 2	Bob Murphy
Sandy Saddler	(United Kingdom) (Republic of Ireland) 3 & 2	Downing Gray
Rodney Foster	halved	Ron Cerrudo
Sandy Pirie	(United States) 4 & 3	Bob Dickson
Tom Craddock	(United Kingdom) (Republic of Ireland) 5 & 4	Jack Lewis Jr
Peter Oosterhuis	(United States) 1 up	Jimmy Grant
Dudley Millensted	(United States) 3 & 1	Ed Tutwiler
3	Singles	4
7	Overall	13
