= 1989 Walker Cup =

Golf tournament

32nd Walker Cup Match
- Dates: August 16–17, 1989
- Venue: Peachtree Golf Club
- Location: Atlanta, Georgia
- Captains: Fred Ridley (USA); Geoff Marks (GB&I)
(United States)	11½	12½	(United Kingdom) (Republic of Ireland)
- Great Britain & Ireland wins the Walker Cup

The 1989 Walker Cup, the 32nd Walker Cup Match, was played on August 16 and 17, 1989, at Peachtree Golf Club, Atlanta, Georgia. The event was won by the Great Britain and Ireland team, 12½ to 11½. It was the Great Britain and Ireland team's third win in the Walker Cup and their first in the United States. Of the previous 31 matches, the United States had won 28, lost 2 and had tied once, at Baltimore Country Club in 1965.

Great Britain and Ireland had taken an 11–5 lead after the second-day foursomes, needing just 1½ points from the 8 afternoon singles matches. However, the United States staged a recovery and won 5 and halved 2 of the first 7 matches. That meant that if Jay Sigel beat Jim Milligan in the final match, the result would be a tie and the United States would retain the Cup as defending holders. Sigel was 3-up after 11 holes and still 2-up after 15. Milligan won the 16th hole after pitching close and then won the 17th after chipping in, leveling the match. Both players took bogey 5s at the final hole to leave the match halved and to give Great Britain and Ireland a 12½–11½ victory.

== Format ==
The format for play on Wednesday and Thursday was the same. There were four matches of foursomes in the morning and eight singles matches in the afternoon. In all, 24 matches were played.

Each of the 24 matches was worth one point in the larger team competition. If a match was all square after the 18th hole extra holes were not played. Rather, each side earned ½ a point toward their team total. The team that accumulated at least 12½ points won the competition. If the two teams were tied, the previous winner would retain the trophy.

== Teams ==
Ten players for the United States and Great Britain & Ireland participated in the event plus one non-playing captain for each team.

=== United States ===
Captain: Fred Ridley

- David Eger
- Robert Gamez
- Ralph Howe
- Kevin Johnson
- Greg Lesher
- Doug Martin
- Eric Meeks
- Phil Mickelson
- Jay Sigel
- Danny Yates

Allen Doyle was selected for the team but withdrew because of injury and was replaced by Greg Lesher.

=== Great Britain & Ireland ===
&
Captain: (England) Geoff Marks

- (England) Craig Cassells
- (England) Russell Claydon
- (Wales) Stephen Dodd
- (England) Andrew Hare
- (England) Peter McEvoy
- (Republic of Ireland) Garth McGimpsey
- (Scotland) Jim Milligan
- (Republic of Ireland) Eoghan O'Connell
- (England) Darren Prosser
- (Wales) Neil Roderick

== Wednesday's matches ==
=== Morning foursomes ===
&	Results
Claydon/Prosser	(United States) 3 & 2	Gamez/Martin
McEvoy/O’Connell	(United Kingdom) (Republic of Ireland) 6 & 5	Lesher/Sigel
Dodd/McGimpsey	halved	Yates/Mickelson
Milligan/Hare	(United Kingdom) (Republic of Ireland) 2 & 1	Eger/Johnson
2½	Foursomes	1½
2½	Overall	1½

=== Afternoon singles ===
&	Results
Jim Milligan	(United States) 7 & 6	Robert Gamez
Russell Claydon	(United Kingdom) (Republic of Ireland) 5 & 4	Doug Martin
Eoghan O’Connell	(United Kingdom) (Republic of Ireland) 5 & 4	Ralph Howe
Stephen Dodd	halved	Eric Meeks
Garth McGimpsey	(United States) 4 & 2	Phil Mickelson
Peter McEvoy	(United Kingdom) (Republic of Ireland) 2 & 1	Danny Yates
Craig Cassells	(United Kingdom) (Republic of Ireland) 1 up	Greg Lesher
Neil Roderick	halved	Jay Sigel
5	Singles	3
7½	Overall	4½

== Thursday's matches ==
=== Morning foursomes ===
&	Results
McEvoy/O’Connell	halved	Gamez/Martin
Claydon/Cassells	(United Kingdom) (Republic of Ireland) 3 & 2	Sigel/Lesher
Milligan/Hare	(United Kingdom) (Republic of Ireland) 2 & 1	Eger/Johnson
McGimpsey/Dodd	(United Kingdom) (Republic of Ireland) 2 & 1	Mickelson/Yates
3½	Foursomes	½
11	Overall	5

=== Afternoon singles ===
&	Results
Stephen Dodd	(United States) 1 up	Robert Gamez
Andrew Hare	halved	Doug Martin
Russell Claydon	(United States) 3 & 2	Greg Lesher
Peter McEvoy	(United States) 4 & 3	Danny Yates
Eoghan O’Connell	halved	Phil Mickelson
Neil Roderick	(United States) 4 & 2	David Eger
Craig Cassells	(United States) 4 & 2	Kevin Johnson
Jim Milligan	halved	Jay Sigel
1½	Singles	6½
12½	Overall	11½
