= 1928 Walker Cup =

Golf tournament

5th Walker Cup Match
- Dates: August 30–31, 1928
- Venue: Chicago Golf Club
- Location: Wheaton, Illinois
- Captains: Bobby Jones (USA); William Tweddell (GB&I)
(United States)	11	1	(United Kingdom) (Republic of Ireland)
- United States wins the Walker Cup

The 1928 Walker Cup, the 5th Walker Cup Match, was played on August 30 and 31, 1928, at Chicago Golf Club, Wheaton, Illinois. The United States won by 11 matches to 1.

== Format ==
Four 36-hole matches of foursomes were played on Thursday and eight singles matches on Friday. Each of the 12 matches was worth one point in the larger team competition. If a match was all square after the 36th hole extra holes were not played. The team with most points won the competition. If the two teams were tied, the previous winner would retain the trophy.

== Teams ==
The United States picked their team of 8 in late-April. Great Britain and Ireland selected a team of 10 in mid-June. This team included Cyril Tolley but he withdrew at the end of the month and was replaced by Noel Martin. At his time Tolley had become involved in a libel action against J. S. Fry & Sons of Bristol, chocolate manufacturers who had produced an advert in which Tolley was caricatured.

=== United States ===
Playing captain: Bobby Jones

- Chick Evans
- Watts Gunn
- Jimmy Johnston
- Roland MacKenzie
- Francis Ouimet
- Jess Sweetser
- George Von Elm

=== Great Britain & Ireland ===
&
Playing captain: (England) William Tweddell

- (England) John Beck
- (England) Ronald Hardman
- (Northern Ireland) Charles Hezlet
- (Scotland) William Hope
- (Scotland) Archibald MacCallum
- (Northern Ireland) Noel Martin
- (England) Philip Perkins
- (England) Eustace Storey
- (Scotland) Tony Torrance

== Thursday's foursomes ==
&	Results
Perkins/Tweddell	(United States) 7 & 6	Von Elm/Sweetser
Hezlet/Hope	(United States) 5 & 3	Jones/Evans
Storey/Torrance	(United States) 4 & 2	Johnston/Ouimet
Beck/MacCallum	(United States) 7 & 5	Gunn/MacKenzie
0	Foursomes	4
0	Overall	4

== Friday's singles ==
&	Results
Philip Perkins	(United States) 13 & 12	Bobby Jones
William Tweddell	(United States) 3 & 2	George Von Elm
Charles Hezlet	(United States) 8 & 7	Francis Ouimet
William Hope	(United States) 5 & 4	Jess Sweetser
Eustace Storey	(United States) 4 & 2	Jimmy Johnston
Tony Torrance	(United Kingdom) (Republic of Ireland) 1 up	Chick Evans
Ronald Hardman	(United States) 11 & 10	Watts Gunn
Noel Martin	(United States) 2 & 1	Roland MacKenzie
1	Singles	7
1	Overall	11
