= Todd Demsey =

American golfer (born 1972)

Personal information
- Nationality: United States
- Born: May 27, 1972 (age 54) Ridgewood, New Jersey, U.S.
- Height: 6 ft 2 in (1.88 m)
- Weight: 175 lb (79 kg; 12.5 st)

Career
- Sport: Golf
- College: Arizona State University
- Turned professional: 1995
- Former tours: PGA Tour; Nationwide Tour; Gateway Tour
- Professional wins: 6

Best results in major championships
- Masters Tournament: DNP
- PGA Championship: DNP
- U.S. Open: CUT: 1996
- The Open Championship: DNP

Todd Demsey (born May 27, 1972) is an American professional golfer on the PGA Tour and 1993 NCAA champion.

== Early life and amateur career ==
Demsey was born in Ridgewood, New Jersey. He graduated from Arizona State University in 1995 with a degree in Psychology. He earned All-American honors four years in a row while in college, from 1992 to 1995, and was on the winning American 1993 Walker Cup team. Demsey's college roommate was PGA Tour pro Phil Mickelson. He was inducted into the ASU Sports Hall of Fame in 2006.

== Professional career ==
In 1995, Demsey turned professional. He played on the PGA Tour in 1997, when he made the cut in only nine of 27 events as a rookie. Back injuries slowed his career on the Nationwide Tour, but the real jolt came in 2002 when he felt constant pressure in his left sinus. At the end of the year, doctors found a tumor, a fifth nerve schwannoma, behind his left sinus going into his brain. He has had two surgeries to remove the tumor.

In 2007, Demsey closed with an 8-under 64 in the sixth and final round of Q-school to earn a full-exempt card for the 2008 PGA Tour season.

== Awards and honors ==
In 2006, Demsey was inducted into Arizona State University's Sports Hall of Fame

== Amateur wins ==
- 1993 NCAA Division I Championship, Pacific Coast Amateur
- 1992 California State Amateur

== Professional wins (6) ==
=== Gateway Tour wins (3) ===
No.	Date	Tournament	Winning score	Margin of victory	Runner(s)-up
1	Jan 18, 2006	Desert Spring A3	−12 (72-65-67=204)	Playoff	(United States) John Douma, (United States) Brad Jacobson
2	Mar 17, 2011	Arizona Series 8	−13 (70-67-66=203)	4 strokes	(United States) Eric Meierdierks
3	Mar 25, 2011	Arizona Series 9	−17 (67-63-69=199)	4 strokes	(United States) Nick Hodge

=== Other wins (3) ===
- 1998 California State Open, Utah Open, Arizona Open

== Results in major championships ==
Tournament	1996
U.S. Open	CUT

Note: Demsey only played in the U.S. Open.
CUT = missed the half-way cut

== U.S. national team appearances ==
Amateur

- Walker Cup: 1993 (winners)
- Eisenhower Trophy: 1994 (winners)

== See also ==
- 1996 PGA Tour Qualifying School graduates
- 2007 PGA Tour Qualifying School graduates
