= Downing Gray =

American golfer (born 1938)

Personal information
- Full name: Albert Downing Gray
- Nationality: United States
- Born: 1938 (age 87–88) Pensacola, Florida, U.S.
- Height: 5 ft 9 in (1.75 m)

Career
- Sport: Golf
- College: Florida State University
- Status: Amateur

Best results in major championships
- Masters Tournament: T31: 1965
- PGA Championship: DNP
- U.S. Open: DNP
- The Open Championship: DNP

Albert Downing Gray (born 1938) is an American amateur golfer.

Gray played college golf at Florida State University, where he once won seven straight tournaments. He played in the Masters Tournament seven times, twice finishing as low amateur. He had a long relationship with the United States Walker Cup team, appearing three times as a player (1963, 1965, and 1967) and twice as a captain (1995 and 1997).

He played in the U.S. Amateur 19 times, finishing as runner-up in 1962.

Gray is a member of the FSU Hall of Fame, the Southern Golf Association Hall of Fame, and the Florida State Golf Association Hall of Fame.

== Results in major championships ==
Tournament	1963	1964	1965	1966	1967	1968	1969	1970	1971	1972	1973	1974
Masters Tournament	T46	CUT	T31LA	T54	T36LA	CUT						CUT

Note: The only major Gray played was the Masters.

Did not play

LA = Low amateur
CUT = missed the half-way cut
"T" = tied

== U.S. national team appearances ==
Amateur

- Walker Cup: 1963 (winners), 1965 (tied, cup retained), 1967 (winners), 1995 (non-playing captain), 1997 (non-playing captain, winners)
- Eisenhower Trophy: 1966
- Americas Cup: 1965, 1967 (winners)
