= Mike Brannan =

American professional golfer (1955–2013)

Personal information
- Full name: Michael Alan Brannan
- Nationality: United States
- Born: December 27, 1955 Salinas, California, U.S.
- Died: January 8, 2013 (aged 57) Alamo, California, U.S.
- Height: 5 ft 11 in (1.80 m)
- Weight: 185 lb (84 kg; 13.2 st)

Career
- Sport: Golf
- College: Brigham Young University
- Turned professional: 1978 reinstated amateur c.1988
- Former tour: PGA Tour
- Professional wins: 4

Best results in major championships
- Masters Tournament: CUT: 1978
- PGA Championship: CUT: 1979, 1980
- U.S. Open: T22: 1982
- The Open Championship: DNP

Michael Alan Brannan (December 27, 1955 – January 8, 2013) was an American professional golfer.

== Early life and amateur career ==
Brannan was born in Salinas, California. He won the U.S. Junior Amateur in 1971, beating Robert Steele in the final, 4 and 3, to become the tournament's youngest champion, at 15 years, 8 months. His record stood for 20 years until broken by Tiger Woods in 1991 (15 years, 6 months). He also played on the winning 1977 Walker Cup team. He played college golf at Brigham Young University, where he was a four-time All-American, graduating in 1978.

== Professional career ==
In 1978, Brannan turned professional. He played on the PGA Tour from 1979 to 1983. His best finish on tour was second place at the 1979 Houston Open, two strokes behind Wayne Levi. He won the 1979 Hassan II Golf Trophy, which would later become a European Tour event.

Brannan quit the tour after the 1983 season and became an equipment rep for Ping, a position he held until his death in 2013.

== Reinstated amateur status ==
In the late 1980s, Brannan was reinstated as an amateur golfer. He won the Northern California Senior Championship in 2012.

== Awards and honors ==
In 1989, Brannan was inducted into the BYU Hall of Fame

== Amateur wins ==
- 1970 Junior World Golf Championships (Boys 13–14)
- 1971 U.S. Junior Amateur
- 1973 California State Amateur, Pacific Coast Amateur, NCGA Junior, NGGA Four-Ball (with Jim Latham)
- 1976 California State Amateur, NCGA Amateur Match Play
- 2012 NCGA Senior Championship

== Professional wins ==
- 1973 California State Open (as an amateur)
- 1975 Utah Open
- 1979 Hassan II Golf Trophy
- 1981 Northern California Open

== U.S. national team appearances ==
- Walker Cup: 1977 (winners)

== See also ==
- 1982 PGA Tour Qualifying School graduates
