= 1934 Walker Cup =

Golf tournament

8th Walker Cup Match
- Dates: 11–12 May 1934
- Venue: Old Course at St Andrews
- Location: St Andrews, Scotland
- Captains: Michael Scott (GB&I); Francis Ouimet (USA)
(United Kingdom) (Republic of Ireland)	2	9	(United States)
- United States wins the Walker Cup

The 1934 Walker Cup, the 8th Walker Cup Match, was played on 11 and 12 May 1934, on the Old Course at St Andrews, Scotland. The United States won by 9 matches to 2 with one match halved. The United States won three foursomes matches and six of the singles matches.

== Format ==
Four 36-hole matches of foursomes were played on Friday and eight singles matches on Saturday. Each of the 12 matches was worth one point in the larger team competition. If a match was all square after the 36th hole extra holes were not played. The team with most points won the competition. If the two teams were tied, the previous winner would retain the trophy.

== Teams ==
The United States picked a 9-man team in early January, including Francis Ouimet as playing-captain. Great Britain and Ireland announced 8 of their 10-man team in mid-March with Michael Scott as playing-captain. Eric McRuvie and Lionel Munn were later added. Munn, from Northern Ireland, travelled to St Andrews but suffered from sciatica, withdrawing two days before the match. He was replaced by Leonard Crawley.

=== Great Britain & Ireland ===
&
Playing captain: (England) Michael Scott

- (England) Harry Bentley
- (England) Leonard Crawley
- (England) Eric Fiddian
- (Scotland) Sam McKinlay
- (Scotland) Jack McLean
- (Scotland) Eric McRuvie
- (England) Cyril Tolley
- (Scotland) Tony Torrance
- (England) Roger Wethered

=== United States ===
Playing captain: Francis Ouimet

- George Dunlap
- Chandler Egan
- Johnny Fischer
- Johnny Goodman
- Lawson Little
- Max Marston
- Gus Moreland
- Jack Westland

== Friday's foursomes ==
&	Results
Wethered/Tolley	(United States) 8 & 6	Goodman/Little
McRuvie/McLean	(United Kingdom) (Republic of Ireland) 4 & 2	Ouimet/Dunlap
Bentley/Fiddian	(United States) 6 & 5	Moreland/Westland
Scott/McKinlay	(United States) 3 & 2	Egan/Marston
1	Foursomes	3
1	Overall	3

== Saturday's singles ==
&	Results
Michael Scott	(United States) 7 & 6	Johnny Goodman
Cyril Tolley	(United States) 6 & 5	Lawson Little
Jack McLean	(United States) 4 & 3	George Dunlap
Leonard Crawley	(United States) 5 & 4	Francis Ouimet
Eric Fiddian	(United States) 5 & 4	Johnny Fischer
Tony Torrance	(United Kingdom) (Republic of Ireland) 4 & 3	Max Marston
Eric McRuvie	halved	Jack Westland
Sam McKinlay	(United States) 3 & 1	Gus Moreland
1	Singles	6
2	Overall	9
