= Oscar Willing =

Oscar Frederick "Doc" Willing (October 16, 1889 – March 2, 1962) was an American amateur golfer. He played in three Walker Cup matches.

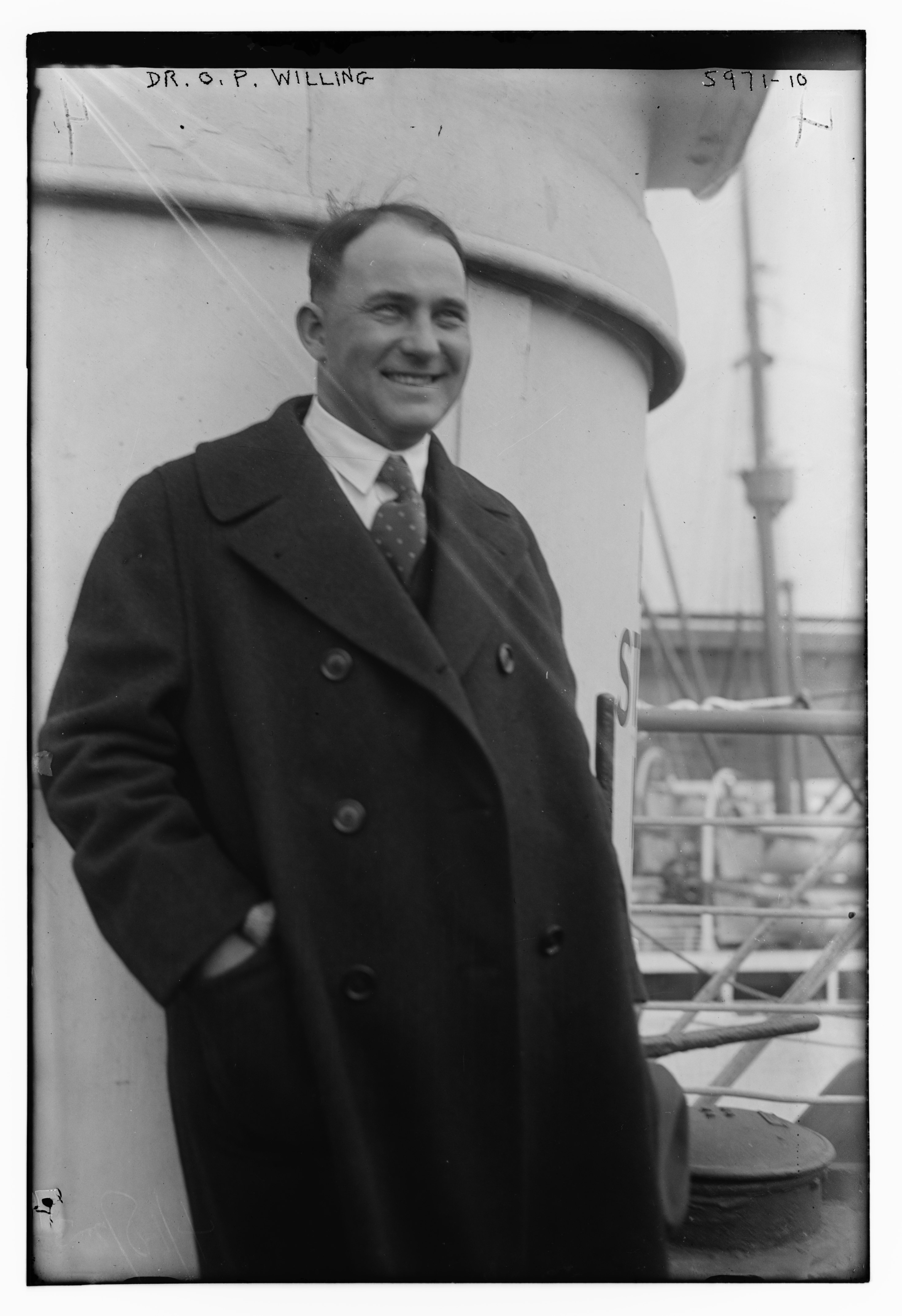
Oscar Willing

== Early life ==
Willing was born in Sellwood, Oregon (now a part of Portland), and caddied and learned to play golf at the nearby Waverley Country Club. He became a dentist, earning his DDS at North Pacific Dental College (later incorporated into Oregon Health & Science University School of Dentistry). Soon afterwards, he was drafted in the United States Navy for World War I where he became a military dentist. He married Helen Wadsworth and they had three children.

== Golf career ==
Following the war, Willing returned to Portland to set up a dental practice. His interest in golf was still strong, as he had been able to play golf while stationed on the east coast during the war. He began to compete in Northwest amateur tournaments, and his first win came in 1919 at the Oregon Coast Invitational in Gearhart, Oregon. He followed that up with back-to-back Portland City Amateur tournaments at Eastmoreland Golf Course in 1920 and 1921. Willing also played in the U.S. Amateur in 1921, losing in the second round to a young Bobby Jones. That same year, he returned to Oregon to win the Oregon Men's Amateur for the first of five times.

In 1928, Willing won two major Northwest tournaments, the Oregon Open and the Northwest Open, and also took his second Pacific Northwest Men's Amateur title. A year later, he had his biggest national finish at the U.S. Amateur played at Pebble Beach Golf Links, where he defeated two-time champion and fellow Portlander Chandler Egan in the semifinals before losing to Jimmy Johnston in the finals.

Willing was the first Pacific Northwesterner to be selected to the prestigious United States Walker Cup team in 1923, and was also chosen in 1924 and 1930. He was undefeated in all his matches and his victory in 1923 clinched the tournament for the Americans. He played as Bobby Jones partner in the 1930 tournament.

== Legacy ==
Willing continued to golf competitively into his 60s. He died in Orange County, California in 1962. He was named to the Pacific Northwest Golf Association Hall of Fame in 1993, and was an inaugural inductee of the Oregon Sports Hall of Fame in 1980.

== Tournament wins ==
- 1921 Oregon Amateur
- 1922 Oregon Amateur
- 1924 Oregon Amateur, Pacific Northwest Amateur
- 1928 Pacific Northwest Amateur, Northwest Open, Oregon Open
- 1929 Oregon Amateur
- 1938 Oregon Amateur

== Tournament runner-up finishes ==
- 1923 Oregon Men's Amateur
- 1926 Oregon Men's Amateur, Pacific Northwest Men's Amateur
- 1929 U.S. Amateur
- 1931 Pacific Northwest Men's Amateur

== Results in major championships ==
Tournament	1920	1921	1922	1923	1924	1925	1926	1927	1928	1929
U.S. Amateur		R16			DNQ			R32	QF	2
The Amateur Championship				R16						

Tournament	1930	1931	1932	1933	1934	1935	1936	1937	1938	1939
U.S. Amateur	R32							R32		
The Amateur Championship	R256									

Top 10
Did not play

"T" indicates a tie for a place
DNQ = Did not qualify for match play portion
R256, R128, R64, R32, R16, QF, SF = Round in which player lost in match play

Source U.S. Amateur: USGA Championship Database

Source for 1923 British Amateur: The American Golfer, July, 1923, pg. 48.

Source for 1930 British Amateur: The Glasgow Herald, May 28, 1930, pg. 4.

== U.S. national team appearances ==
Amateur

- Walker Cup: 1923 (winners), 1924 (winners), 1930 (winners)
