= Jimmy Johnston (golfer) =

American amateur golfer

Personal information
- Full name: Harrison Requa Johnston
- Nickname: Jimmy
- Nationality: United States
- Born: August 31, 1896 St. Paul, Minnesota, U.S.
- Died: November 18, 1969 (aged 73) Palm Beach County, Florida, U.S.
- Height: 5 ft 7 in (1.70 m)

Career
- Sport: Golf
- Status: Amateur
- Professional wins: 2

Best results in major championships (wins: 1)
- Masters Tournament: DNP
- PGA Championship: DNP
- U.S. Open: T19: 1927
- The Open Championship: DNP
- U.S. Amateur: Won: 1929
- British Amateur: T5: 1930

Harrison Requa "Jimmy" Johnston (August 31, 1896 – November 18, 1969) was an American amateur golfer.

== Early life ==
Johnston was born in Saint Paul, Minnesota, on August 31, 1896. He was the son of architect Clarence H. Johnston Sr. and Mary "May" Johnston (née Thurston).

== Golf career ==
Johnston won the Minnesota State Amateur title seven straight years (1921–1927) and won the Minnesota State Open twice (1927–28). He was elected to the Minnesota Golf Hall of Fame in 1988.

Johnston's biggest win came at the 1929 U.S. Amateur where he beat Oscar Willing, 4 and 3, at Pebble Beach Golf Links.

Johnston played on four winning Walker Cup teams: 1923, 1924, 1928, and 1930. He was also a member of the 1932 team but did not play in any matches.

Johnston led the 1927 U.S. Open after two rounds but slipped to tie for 19th after a third round 87.

== Personal life ==
Johnston served in the Army in both World War I and World War II.

He died on November 18, 1969, in Palm Beach County, Florida. He was buried at Fort Snelling National Cemetery in Minneapolis, Minnesota.

== Tournament wins ==
- 1921 Minnesota State Amateur
- 1922 Minnesota State Amateur
- 1923 Minnesota State Amateur
- 1924 Western Amateur, Minnesota State Amateur
- 1925 Minnesota State Amateur
- 1926 Minnesota State Amateur
- 1927 Minnesota State Amateur, Minnesota State Open
- 1928 Minnesota State Open
- 1929 **U.S. Amateur**

Note: Major championships in bold
