= List of Great Britain and Ireland Walker Cup golfers =

This is a list of all the golfers who have played in the Walker Cup for the Great Britain and Ireland team through 2025. Joe Carr holds the record with eleven appearances.

== Players ==
Player	Editions
(Scotland) Cameron Adam	2025
(Wales) James Ashfield	2023
(England) Michael Attenborough	1967
(England) Colin Aylmer	1922
(England) Eliot Baker	2025
(England) Peter Baker	1985
(England) John Beck	1928, 1938^
(England) Peter Benka	1969
(England) Harry Bentley	1934, 1936, 1938
(England) Jack Bigham	2023
(Scotland) David Blair	1955, 1961
(Scotland) Cecil Bloice	1985
(England) Jake Bolton	2021 (Note: He was a reserve but played because a number of players were ill.)
(England) Michael Bonallack	1957^, 1959, 1961, 1963, 1965, 1967, 1969, 1971, 1973
(Scotland) Jack Bookless	1932^
(Wales) David Boote	2017
(Scotland) Wallace Booth	2009
(Scotland) Gordon Brand Jnr	1979
(England) Orme Bristowe	1924
(Scotland) Allan Brodie	1977, 1979
(Scotland) Andrew Brooks	1969
(Scotland) Michael Brooks	1997
(England) Barclay Brown	2021, 2023
(England) Steven Brown	2011
(Northern Ireland) William Brownlow	1926
(Republic of Ireland) Jimmy Bruen	1938, 1949, 1951
(Wales) Jimmy Buckley	1979
(Republic of Ireland) John Burke	1932
(Northern Ireland) Raymond Burns	1993
(Scotland) Alan Bussell	1957
(Scotland) James Byrne	2011
(England) Stuart Cage	1993
(England) Ian Caldwell	1951, 1955
(Republic of Ireland) Jonathan Caldwell	2007
(Scotland) William Campbell	1930
(Republic of Ireland) Joe Carr	1947, 1949, 1951, 1953, 1955, 1957, 1959, 1961, 1963, 1965^, 1967
(Republic of Ireland) Roddy Carr	1971
(Scotland) David Carrick	1983, 1987
(Scotland) Iain Carslaw	1979
(England) Paul Casey	1999
(England) Craig Cassells	1989
(Scotland) Robin Cater	1955
(Scotland) John Caven	1922, 1923^
(England) Brian Chapman	1961
(England) Roger Chapman	1981
(England) Ashley Chesters	2015
(England) Martin Christmas	1961, 1963
(England) Clive Clark	1965
(England) Gordon Clark	1965
(England) Howard Clark	1973
(England) Russell Claydon	1989
(England) Dominic Clemons	2025
(Scotland) Andrew Coltart	1991
(Scotland) Gordon Cosh	1965
(Republic of Ireland) Richie Coughlan	1997
(Republic of Ireland) Tom Craddock	1967, 1969
(England) Leonard Crawley	1932, 1934, 1938, 1947
(England) Bruce Critchley	1969
(England) David Curry	1987
(Northern Ireland) Paul Cutler	2011
(Scotland) Colin Dalgleish	1981
(England) Bernard Darwin	1922
(Wales) Jack Davidson	2017
(England) John Davies	1973, 1975, 1977, 1979
(Wales) Rhys Davies	2005, 2007
(Scotland) Gavin Dear	2009
(England) Peter Deeble	1977, 1981
(England) John de Forest	1932
(Scotland) Frank Deighton	1951^, 1957
(England) Robert Dinwiddie	2005
(Wales) Stephen Dodd	1989
(England) Luke Donald	1999, 2001
(England) Nick Dougherty	2001
(Wales) Bradley Dredge	1993
(Northern Ireland) Norman Drew	1953
(Northern Ireland) Alan Dunbar	2011
(Wales) Tony Duncan	1953^
(Republic of Ireland) Paul Dunne	2015
(England) Jack Dyer	2021
(Scotland) Morton Dykes	1936
(England) Simon Dyson	1999
(Wales) Nigel Edwards	2001, 2003, 2005, 2007
(England) Bobby Eggo	1987
(England) Harry Ellis	2017
(England) Jamie Elson	2001
(Wales) Duncan Evans	1981
(England) Gary Evans	1991
(Republic of Ireland) Cecil Ewing	1936, 1938, 1947, 1949, 1951, 1955
(England) Richard Eyles	1975
(Republic of Ireland) Jody Fanagan	1995
(Scotland) Ewen Ferguson	2015
(England) Eric Fiddian	1932, 1934
(England) Oliver Fisher	2005
(England) Alex Fitzpatrick	2019, 2021
(England) Matt Fitzpatrick	2013
(England) Angus Flanagan	2021
(England) Tommy Fleetwood	2009
(Scotland) Grant Forrest	2015
(England) Charlie Forster	2025
(England) Mark Foster	1995
(England) Rodney Foster	1965, 1967, 1969, 1971, 1973
(Republic of Ireland) Noel Fox	2003
(England) David Frame	1961
(Scotland) Stephen Gallacher	1995
(England) David Gilford	1985
(Scotland) Paul Girvan	1987
(England) Luke Goddard	2009
(England) Geoffrey Godwin	1979, 1981
(Scotland) Graham Gordon	2003
(England) Conor Gough	2019, 2023
(Scotland) Connor Graham	2023, 2025
(Scotland) Charlie Green	1963, 1969, 1971, 1973, 1975
(England) Scott Gregory	2017
(Republic of Ireland) Stuart Grehan	2025
(Republic of Ireland) Paddy Gribben	1999
(England) Matt Haines	2009
(England) Harry Hall	2019
(England) Ronald Hardman	1928
(England) Andrew Hare	1989
(Republic of Ireland) Pádraig Harrington	1991, 1993, 1995
(Scotland) Robert Harris	1922^, 1923, 1926, 1930^
(England) Lister Hartley	1932
(England) Rex Hartley	1930, 1932
(England) John Hawksworth	1985
(Scotland) Garry Hay	1991
(England) Peter Hedges	1973, 1975
(Northern Ireland) Charles Hezlet	1924, 1926, 1928
(England) Alec Hill	1936
(England) Stiggy Hodgson	2009, 2011
(Republic of Ireland) Michael Hoey	2001
(England) Ernest Holderness	1923, 1926, 1930
(England) Trevor Homer	1973
(England) Chubby Hooman	1922, 1923
(Scotland) William Hope	1923, 1924, 1928
(England) David Horsey	2007
(England) Sam Horsfield	2015+
(Scotland) Barclay Howard	1995, 1997
(England) David Howell	1995
(England) Gordon Huddy	1961
(Republic of Ireland) Jack Hume	2015
(England) Warren Humphreys	1971
(Republic of Ireland) Gary Hurley	2015
(Scotland) Ian Hutcheon	1975, 1977, 1979, 1981
(England) Sam Hutsby	2009
(Scotland) David Inglis	2003
(Scotland) Reid Jack	1957, 1959
(England) Lee S. James	1995
(England) Mark James	1975
(Scotland) Andrew Jamieson Jr.	1926
(England) Ben Jones	2021
(England) Matthew Jordan	2017
(Republic of Ireland) Niall Kearney	2009
(England) Michael Kelley	1977, 1979
(Scotland) Lorne Kelly	1999
(England) Stephen Keppler	1983
(England) Nathan Kimsey	2013
(England) Michael King	1969, 1973
(Scotland) Alex Kyle	1938, 1947, 1951
(Scotland) Dennis Kyle	1924
(England) Matty Lamb	2021
(Scotland) Jack Lang	1930^
(England) John Langley	1936, 1951, 1953
(England) Malcolm Lewis	1983
(England) Tom Lewis	2011
(England) Gary Lockerbie	2005
(England) Joe Long	2021
(England) Laddie Lucas	1936^, 1947, 1949^
(England) Michael Lunt	1959, 1961, 1963, 1965
(England) Sandy Lyle	1977
(Scotland) Archibald MacCallum	1928
(Scotland) Scott Macdonald	1971
(Scotland) George Macgregor	1971, 1975, 1983, 1985, 1987
(Scotland) Roy MacGregor	1953
(Scotland) Robert MacIntyre	2017
(Scotland) Willis Mackenzie	1922, 1923
(Republic of Ireland) David Madeley	1963
(Republic of Ireland) Alex Maguire	2023
(Wales) Stuart Manley	2003
(Scotland) Lindsay Mann	1983
(Scotland) Brian Marchbank	1979
(England) Geoff Marks	1969, 1971
(England) David Marsh	1959^, 1971
(Northern Ireland) Noel Martin	1928
(Scotland) Steve Martin	1977
(Wales) Llewellyn Matthews	2007
(Wales) Paul Mayo	1985, 1987
(Republic of Ireland) Paul McBride	2017
(Northern Ireland) Matthew McClean	2023
(Northern Ireland) Max McCready	1949, 1951
(Scotland) Jack McDonald	2015
(Republic of Ireland) Graeme McDowell	2001
(Republic of Ireland) Brian McElhinney	2005
(England) Peter McEvoy	1977, 1979, 1981, 1985, 1989
(England) Richard McEvoy	2001
(Republic of Ireland) Garth McGimpsey	1985, 1989, 1991
(Republic of Ireland) Paul McGinley	1991
(Republic of Ireland) John McHenry	1987
(Republic of Ireland) Rory McIlroy	2007
(Scotland) Paul McKellar	1977
(Scotland) Sam McKinlay	1934
(Scotland) Jack McLean	1934, 1936
(Scotland) Eric McRuvie	1932, 1934
(England) Gerald Micklem	1947, 1949, 1953, 1955
(England) Dudley Millensted	1967
(Scotland) Jim Milligan	1989, 1991
(England) Bunny Millward	1949^, 1955
(Scotland) Willie Milne	1973
(Scotland) Colin Montgomerie	1985, 1987
(Wales) John Llewellyn Morgan	1951, 1953, 1955
(Republic of Ireland) Colm Moriarty	2003
(England) Jamie Moul	2007
(Republic of Ireland) Gavin Moynihan	2013, 2015
(Republic of Ireland) Pat Mulcare	1975
(England) Jimmy Mullen	2015
(Northern Ireland) Lionel Munn	1934+
(Republic of Ireland) John Murphy	2021
(Scotland) Gordon Murray	1977
(Scotland) Stuart Murray	1963
(Scotland) William Murray	1923, 1924, 1926
(Republic of Ireland) Keith Nolan	1997
(Republic of Ireland) Liam Nolan	2023
(Republic of Ireland) Eoghan O'Connell	1989
(Scotland) Steven O'Hara	2001
(England) Andrew Oldcorn	1983
(England) Peter Oosterhuis	1967
(England) Max Orrin	2013
(England) Paul Page	1993
(England) Chris Paisley	2009
(Wales) David Park	1997
(Wales) Philip Parkin	1983
(England) John Parry	2007
(Scotland) David Patrick	1999
(England) Jim Payne	1991
(England) Frank Pennink	1938
(England) Philip Perkins	1928
(England) Arthur Perowne	1949, 1953, 1959
(Scotland) Gordon Peters	1936, 1938
(Republic of Ireland) Kevin Phelan	2013
(England) Van Phillips	1993
(Republic of Ireland) Arthur Pierse	1983
(Scotland) Sandy Pirie	1967
(England) Alfie Plant	2017
(England) Thomas Plumb	2019
(England) Garrick Porteous	2013
(England) Luke Poulter	2025
(Republic of Ireland) Mark Power	2021, 2023
(England) Martin Poxon	1975
(England) Darren Prosser	1989
(Wales) Rhys Pugh	2011, 2013
(Republic of Ireland) Conor Purcell	2019
(England) Iain Pyman	1993
(Republic of Ireland) Caolan Rafferty	2019
(Republic of Ireland) Ronan Rafferty	1981
(Scotland) Richie Ramsay	2005
(Scotland) Graham Rankin	1995, 1997, 1999
(England) Neil Raymond	2013
(England) Matthew Richardson	2005
(Scotland) Dean Robertson	1993
(England) Jeremy Robinson	1987
(Wales) Neil Roderick	1989
(England) Justin Rose	1997
(England) Phil Rowe	1999
(Scotland) Raymond Russell	1993
(Scotland) Sandy Saddler	1963, 1965, 1967
(Scotland) Lloyd Saltman	2005, 2007
(England) Ben Schmidt	2021
(England) Michael Scott	1924, 1934
(Scotland) Robert Scott Jr.	1924
(Scotland) Calum Scott	2023
(Scotland) Sandy Scott	2019
(England) Philip Scrutton	1955, 1957
(England) Jack Senior	2011
(England) Doug Sewell	1957, 1959
(Scotland) Ronnie Shade	1961, 1963, 1965, 1967
(Northern Ireland) Cormac Sharvin	2015
(Scotland) Graeme Shaw	1987
(Republic of Ireland) David Sheahan	1963
(England) Alec Shepperson	1957, 1959
(Scotland) Gordon Sherry	1995
(Scotland) Niall Shiels Donegan	2025
(England) Callum Shinkwin	2013
(Scotland) Fred Simpson	1926
(England) Jack Singh Brar	2017
(England) Michael Skelton	2003
(England) Tom Sloman	2019
(Scotland) John Nelson Smith	1930
(England) Jordan Smith	2013
(Scotland) Dickson Smith	1959
(England) Matt Stanford	1993
(Scotland) Sandy Stephen	1985
(Scotland) Michael Stewart	2011
(England) Eustace Storey	1924, 1926, 1928
(England) Graeme Storm	1999
(England) Bill Stout	1930, 1932
(England) Charlie Stowe	1938, 1947
(Scotland) Hugh Stuart	1971, 1973, 1975
(Republic of Ireland) James Sugrue	2019
(England) Andy Sullivan	2011
(Scotland) Connor Syme	2017
(England) Alan Thirlwell	1957
(England) Ken Thom	1949
(England) Martin Thompson	1983
(Scotland) Hector Thomson	1936, 1938
(Republic of Ireland) Gavin Tiernan	2025
(England) Cyril Tolley	1922, 1923, 1924, 1926, 1928+, 1930, 1934
(Scotland) Tony Torrance	1924, 1928, 1930, 1932, 1934
(Scotland) William Breck Torrance	1922
(England) Peter Townsend	1965
(England) Peter Tupling	1969
(England) William Tweddell	1928, 1936^
(Scotland) Euan Walker	2019
(Scotland) James Walker	1961
(Republic of Ireland) Philip Walton	1981, 1983
(Scotland) Marc Warren	2001
(Scotland) Craig Watson	1997
(England) Paul Way	1981
(England) Tyler Weaver	2025
(England) Roger Wethered	1922, 1923, 1926, 1930, 1934
(England) Liam White	1991
(England) Ronnie White	1947, 1949, 1951, 1953, 1955
(England) Dale Whitnell	2009
(England) Danny Willett	2007
(England) Ricky Willison	1991
(Scotland) James Wilson	1947, 1953
(Scotland) John Wilson	1923
(England) Oliver Wilson	2003
(Scotland) Stuart Wilson	2003
(England) Gary Wolstenholme	1995, 1997, 1999, 2001, 2003, 2005
(England) Guy Wolstenholme	1957, 1959
(Scotland) Steven Young	1997

^ In the final team but did not play in any matches.
+ Selected for the team but withdrew and was replaced.

== Ryder Cup players ==
The following 30 Great Britain and Ireland Walker Cup players have subsequently played in the Ryder Cup:

Peter Baker, Gordon Brand Jnr, Paul Casey, Clive Clark, Howard Clark, Andrew Coltart, Luke Donald, Norman Drew, Matt Fitzpatrick, Tommy Fleetwood, Stephen Gallacher, David Gilford, Pádraig Harrington, David Howell, Mark James, Michael King, Sandy Lyle, Graeme McDowell, Paul McGinley, Rory McIlroy, Colin Montgomerie, Peter Oosterhuis, Ronan Rafferty, Justin Rose, Andy Sullivan, Peter Townsend, Philip Walton, Paul Way, Danny Willett, Oliver Wilson.

== See also ==
- List of American Walker Cup golfers
- Lists of golfers
