= Bobby Wyatt =

American professional golfer (born 1992)

Personal information
- Nationality: United States
- Born: August 1, 1992 (age 34) Mobile, Alabama, U.S.
- Height: 5 ft 11 in (1.80 m)
- Weight: 175 lb (79 kg; 12.5 st)

Career
- Sport: Golf
- College: University of Alabama
- Turned professional: 2014
- Former tour: PGA Tour

Bobby Wyatt (born August 1, 1992) is an American professional golfer. He had a successful amateur career, playing in the 2013 Walker Cup.

== Youth career ==
Wyatt attended UMS-Wright Preparatory School, graduating in 2010. He shot a 57 at the Alabama Boys State Junior Championship. He was a four-time AHSAA state champion.

== College career ==
He was part of the University of Alabama team that won the 2013 and 2014 NCAA Division I Championship. He won the Southeastern Conference individual championship in 2014. Wyatt was an All-American his senior year.

== Amateur career ==
He won the 2012 Sunnehanna Amateur.

Wyatt was the leading scorer and went undefeated at the 2013 Walker Cup for the United States.

== Professional career ==
Wyatt finished 4th in the 2016 Zurich Classic of New Orleans, playing on a sponsor exemption. This finish earned him enough non-member FedEx Cup points to qualify for the Web.com Tour Finals. He earned a PGA Tour card for 2017 by finishing 22nd on the Finals money list (excluding the 25 regular-season graduates).

== Amateur wins ==
- 2009 Junior Players Championship
- 2010 HP Boys at Carlton Woods, Alabama State Junior
- 2012 Sunnehanna Amateur
- 2014 SEC Championship

== U.S. national team appearances ==
Amateur

- Palmer Cup: 2013
- Walker Cup: 2013 (winners)

== See also ==
- 2016 Web.com Tour Finals graduates
