= Bryce Molder =

American professional golfer (born 1979)

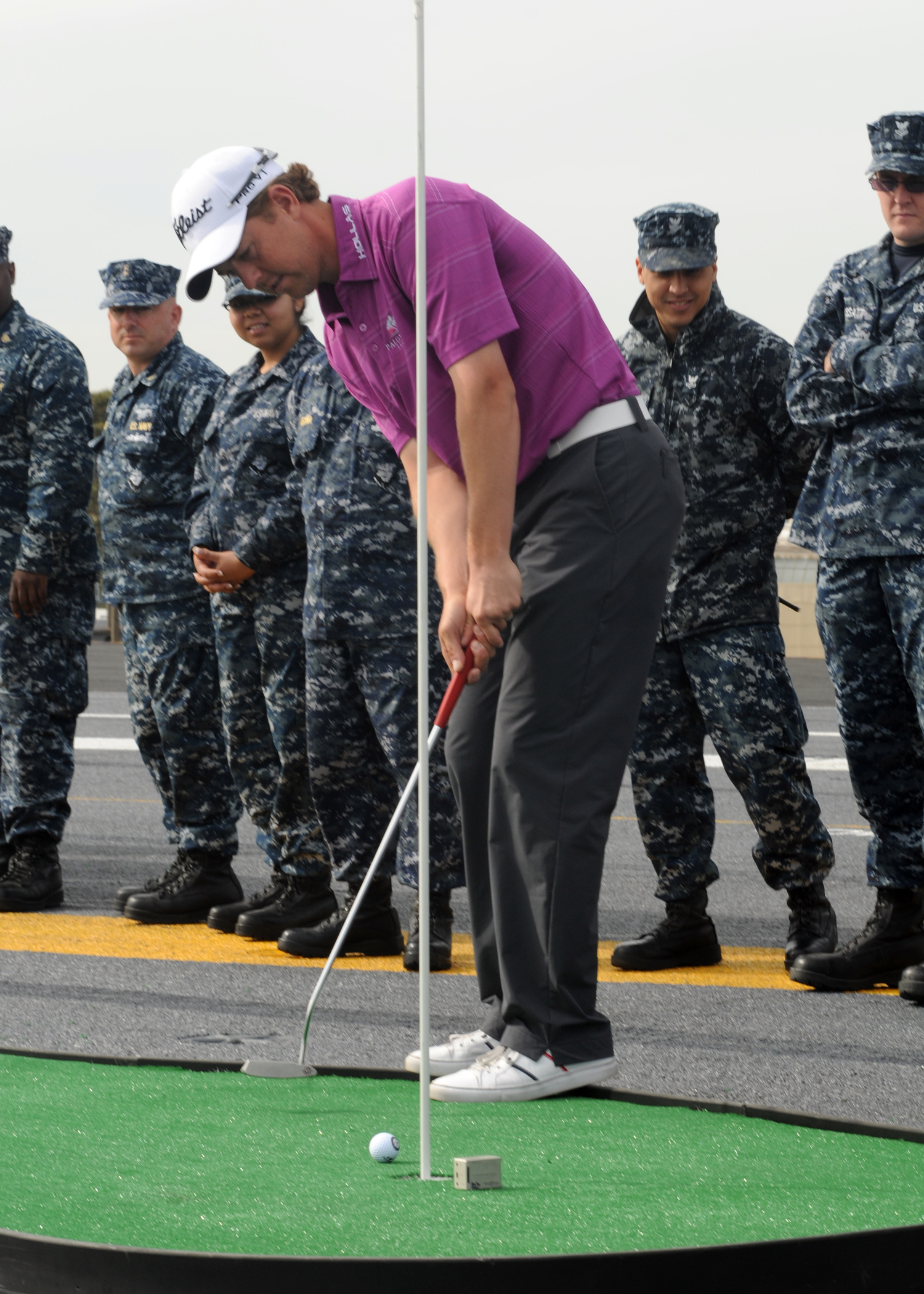
- Molder putting on the flight deck of USS Ronald Reagan (CVN-76) in 2011

Personal information
- Full name: Bryce Wade Molder
- Nationality: United States
- Born: January 27, 1979 (age 47) Harrison, Arkansas, U.S.
- Height: 6 ft 0 in (1.83 m)
- Weight: 180 lb (82 kg; 13 st)
- Spouse: Kelley Fike Molder (m. 2006)

Career
- Sport: Golf
- College: Georgia Tech
- Turned professional: 2001
- Current tour: PGA Tour
- Professional wins: 2
- Highest ranking: 64 (August 15, 2010)

Number of wins by tour
- PGA Tour: 1
- Korn Ferry Tour: 1

Best results in major championships
- Masters Tournament: DNP
- PGA Championship: T12: 2010
- U.S. Open: T30: 2001
- The Open Championship: T43: 2009

Achievements and awards
- Haskins Award: 2001

Bryce Wade Molder (born January 27, 1979) is an American former professional golfer who played on the PGA Tour.

== Early life ==
Molder was born in Harrison, Arkansas and attended public school in Tulsa, Oklahoma and Conway, Arkansas.

He has Poland syndrome, as a result of which he was born with no left pectoral muscle, his left hand is smaller than his right and four fingers on his left hand were webbed at birth. He had two surgeries before the age of five to correct the webbing and other issues with his left hand.

== Amateur career ==
After starring with the Conway High School Golf team, Molder attended Georgia Tech on a golf scholarship and graduated with a degree in management. At Tech, he was a four-time first-team All-American golfer and was named the national Collegiate Golfer of the Year for 2000-2001. Notable teammates at Georgia Tech included Matt Kuchar and Troy Matteson, later fellow PGA Tour professionals.

On a break from college in 1999, Molder shot a 60 at his home course, Chenal Country Club in Little Rock, Arkansas, while playing a round with fellow Arkansan, then-President Bill Clinton. He played in the 2001 U.S. Open as an amateur and shot a 68 during the third round, eventually finishing as low amateur in a tie for 30th place overall.

== Professional career ==
In 2001, Molder turned professional later that summer. He finished third in his first Tour event, the Reno-Tahoe Open, which was won by John Cook. Despite that strong first start at Reno, however, Molder missed earning membership status in the PGA Tour money rankings in the late summer and fall of 2001.

After failing to earn status via the Tour Qualifying school, he was able to secure sponsor invitations to Tour events in 2002, earning a T-9 finish at the Compaq Classic of New Orleans, together with top-15 finishes in two other events, securing Special Temporary Membership by finishing T-12 at the Buick Classic. Noting the pressure that attended his play of the 18th hole in the final round at Westchester Country Club's West Course, Molder, who needed to par the hole in order to insure earning the Temporary Card, said, "Sometimes the hardest thing in the world is to two-putt when you have to." For the remainder of the season, though, his good form of the spring did not hold, and he missed securing status on the Tour for the 2003 season by one place in the money rankings.

For several seasons which followed, Molder played in the Tour's developmental league, the Nationwide Tour, without earning his PGA Tour card, until a breakout season in 2006. Molder's 2006 Nationwide Tour season included four top-10s, eight top-25s, one win and $205,413 in earnings. All this placed him 22nd on the final money list. His first professional victory came in October 2006 at the Miccosukee Championship.

Molder's first full season on the PGA Tour in 2007 was mostly unsuccessful, with only 7 cuts made in 21 events and his only top-10 finish coming with a T-6 in the season-ending Children's Miracle Network Classic. As a result, he returned to the Nationwide Tour in 2008, where he finished 23rd on the money list, made 19 of 27 cuts and earned four top-10s, including a 2nd and a 3rd, winning $234,651.

In 2009 on the PGA Tour, Molder broke out in June at the St. Jude Classic, where he shot a second round 63 followed by a third round 65 and was one shot behind 54-hole leader Brian Gay going into the final round. Molder went on to finish in a tie for 2nd with David Toms on Sunday, four strokes behind the winner, Gay, for his best finish in a PGA Tour event at the time. A few weeks later, Molder finished fourth at the AT&T National, posting 272, five strokes back of winner Tiger Woods. The finish also secured a spot for Molder in the 2009 Open Championship. He finished the year ranked 63rd on the PGA Tour money list with eight top-25 and three top-10 finishes in twenty-one outings. He met with similar success in 2010 on Tour, with six top-10 and ten top-25 finishes in 26 starts.

At the 2011 Frys.com Open, after having secured his 2012 Tour card with five top-10 finishes in 25 tournaments, Molder defeated Briny Baird on the sixth hole of a sudden-death playoff for his maiden PGA Tour win. The win capped a superb weekend of near-flawless play for Molder, who went bogey-free –13 in the final 43 holes of regulation play and –4 in the playoff. He sank a 12-foot putt for birdie on the final hole of regulation play to square things just after Baird, playing one group behind Molder, dramatically chipped-in from 38 feet from the green-side rough for eagle on the 17th hole, temporarily taking a one-stroke lead. When Baird parred the 18th hole, the playoff ensued, with neither player – each seeking his first Tour win after years of trying – able to close it out until Molder's dramatic approach from 133 yards in the 18th fairway to six feet set up his conclusive birdie putt. The win extended Molder's Tour membership through 2013.

In 2017, while attending the ceremony for his induction into the Arkansas Golf Hall of Fame, he announced his retirement from professional golf, saying "I had gotten to the point that it was just not fulfilling anymore".

== Awards and honors ==
- In 2001, Molder won the Haskins Award, bestowed to the top college golfer in the United States.
- In 2017, Molder was inducted into the Arkansas Hall of Fame

== Professional wins (2) ==
=== PGA Tour wins (1) ===
No.	Date	Tournament	Winning score	Margin of victory	Runner-up
1	Oct 9, 2011	Frys.com Open	−17 (71-67-65-64=267)	Playoff	(United States) Briny Baird

PGA Tour playoff record (1–0)

No.	Year	Tournament	Opponent	Result
1	2011	Frys.com Open	(United States) Briny Baird	Won with birdie on sixth extra hole

=== Nationwide Tour wins (1) ===
No.	Date	Tournament	Winning score	Margin of victory	Runner-up
1	Oct 29, 2006	Miccosukee Championship	−14 (65-70-67-68=270)	1 stroke	(United States) Boo Weekley

== Results in major championships ==
Tournament	1999	2000	2001	2002	2003	2004	2005	2006	2007	2008	2009	2010	2011	2012	2013	2014	2015	2016
U.S. Open	CUT		T30LA		CUT													
The Open Championship											T43							
PGA Championship												T12	T56	CUT				CUT

Note: Molder never played in the Masters Tournament.

Did not play

LA = low amateur
CUT = missed the half-way cut
"T" = tied

== U.S. national team appearances ==
Amateur

- Palmer Cup: 1998 (tie), 1999 (winners), 2001 (winners)
- Walker Cup: 1999, 2001
- Eisenhower Trophy: 2000 (team winners and individual leader)

== See also ==
- 2006 Nationwide Tour graduates
- 2008 Nationwide Tour graduates
