= Buddy Marucci =

American amateur golfer (born 1952)

Personal information
- Full name: George Edward Marucci Jr.
- Nickname: Buddy
- Nationality: United States
- Born: March 6, 1952 (age 74) Malvern, Pennsylvania, U.S.
- Height: 5 ft 10 in (1.78 m)

Career
- Sport: Golf
- College: University of Maryland
- Status: Amateur

Best results in major championships
- Masters Tournament: CUT: 1996
- PGA Championship: DNP
- U.S. Open: DNP
- The Open Championship: DNP

George Edward "Buddy" Marucci Jr. (born March 6, 1952) is an American businessman and amateur golfer. He has played in more than 50 USGA amateur championships, and is perhaps best known for battling 19-year-old Tiger Woods in the final round of the 1995 U.S. Amateur, losing by two holes and forcing the defending champion to the 36th (and final) hole.

== Amateur career ==
Born in Malvern, Pennsylvania, the son of a certified public accountant, Marucci attended Haverford High School, and was a 3-time PIAA state golf champion. He went to the University of Maryland on a golf scholarship. He is a four-time Pennsylvania Amateur champion (1982, 1983, 1987 and 1991), two-time winner of the Philadelphia Amateur, and competed in the 1996 Masters Tournament. Marucci was introduced to the national golf audience in 1995 when he battled 19-year-old Tiger Woods down to the final round of the U.S. Amateur, losing by two holes. Marucci played on the U.S. Walker Cup teams in 1995 and 1997, going 3–0 in foursomes and 1–1–1 in singles, leading the U.S. to victory in 1997. He was the captain for the 2007 and 2009 Walker Cup team victories for the United States. In 2008, Marucci won the U.S. Senior Amateur where he beat George Zahringer in the final, 2 up, at Shady Oaks Country Club in Fort Worth, Texas – his first and only USGA Championship. Marucci has been a longtime member of the Merion Golf Club. In 2013, he was the vice-chairman of the 113th U.S. Open held at the Merion.

Marucci was fully exempt for the U.S. Senior Open with his win at the 2008 U.S. Senior Amateur. He was a quarterfinalist at the 2007 U.S. Senior Amateur, reached the match play portion at the 2006 U.S. Mid-Amateur and was a two-time quarterfinalist at the U.S. Amateur and U.S. Mid-Amateur.

== Business career ==
Marucci was co-owner of Pennmark Auto Group, which operated three Mercedes-Benz dealerships and one Porsche dealership in the Philadelphia, Pennsylvania area. The business was sold in 2007 to Condor Automotive Group. His business dealings made him wealthy enough to afford memberships in some of the most famous private golf clubs around the country, including Winged Foot, Seminole, Pine Valley, Caves Valley, and Cypress Point.

== Broadcasting career ==
In 2017, Marucci joined Fox Sports as a golf analyst, offering his thoughts from the course as well as the studio.
