= 1999 European Amateur Team Championship =

Golf competition

Tournament information
- Dates: 29 June – 3 July 1999
- Location: Como, Italy; 45°45′N 9°1′E
- Course: Golf Club Monticello
- Organized by: European Golf Association
- Format: Qualification round: 36 holes stroke play Knock-out match-play

Statistics
- Par: 72
- Length: 7,010 yards (6,410 m)
- Field: 22 teams 132 players

Champion
- Italy; Joachim Hassan, Roberto Paolillo, Stefano Reale, Michele Rigone, Massimiliano Secci, Andrea Zanini
- Qualification round: 718 (−2); Final match: 4–3

Location map
- Location in Europe Location in Italy Location in Lombardy region

The 1999 European Amateur Team Championship took place 29 June – 3 July at Golf Club Monticello in Cassina Rizzardi, 5 kilometres south-west of the city center of Como, Lombardy region, Italy. It was the 21st men's golf European Amateur Team Championship.

== Format ==
Each team consisted of six players, playing two rounds of an opening stroke-play qualifying competition over two days, counting the five best scores each day for each team.

The eight best teams formed flight A, in knock-out match-play over the next three days. The teams were seeded based on their positions after the stroke play. The first placed team were drawn to play the quarter-final against the eight placed team, the second against the seventh, the third against the sixth and the fourth against the fifth. Teams were allowed to use six players during the team matches, selecting four of them in the two morning foursome games and five players in to the afternoon single games. Games all square at the 18th hole were declared halved, if the team match was already decided. The elimination matches and the bronze match were decided with one foursome game and four single games.

The eight teams placed 9–16 in the qualification stroke-play formed flight B and the six teams placed 17–22 formed flight C, to play similar knock-out play, with one foursome game and four single games in each match, to decide their final positions.

== Teams ==
22 nation teams contested the event. Each team consisted of six players.

Players in the teams

Country	Players
Austria	Clemens Conrad Prader, Reinhard Krendl, Thomas Ortner, Ulrich Paulsen, Gerard Wagner, Martin Wiegele
Belgium	Stefan Boschmans, Frederik Dejaeghere, Florian Dohmen, Jerome Theunis, Francois Nicolas, Frederic de Vooght
Croatia	Zlatan Juras, Dragutin Kasapovic, Nicola Kovacevic, Miro Raic, Branko Stoter, Ivo Vokadin
Czech Republic	Miroslav Holub,Radek Horyna, Jakub Kucera, Lukas Nosek, Martin Peterka, Tomas Polisensky
Denmark	Thomas Havemann, Peter Jespersen, Allan Madsen, Søren Muller, Lars Storm, Morten Vildhøj
England	Luke Donald, Simon Dyson, Colin Edwards, Philip Rowe, Graeme Storm, Gary Wolstenholme
Estonia	Valdek Apivala, Jaan Martinson, Marko Palm, Raimond Palm, Mait Schmidt, Enrico Villo
Finland	Tobias Dahlberg, Mikko Ilonen, Mikko Korhonen, Panu Kylliäinen, Mikael Mustonen, Henri Salonen
France	Sebastian Branger, Olivier David, Grégory Havret, Nicolas Marin, Christophe Ravetto, Charles-Henry Quelin
Germany	Kariem Baraka, J.M. Pelz, Benjamin Schlichting, Tino Schuster, Marcel Siem, Michael Thannhäuser
Greece	George Aronis, Vassilis Aronis, Koslas Karagiannis, Steve Parthenis, Stathis Toumazanis, Dimitris Vlachos
Iceland	Ólafur Már Sigurðsson, Helgi Thorsson, Örn Ævar Hjartarson, Haraldur Heimisson, Sigurpall G. Sveinsson, Björgvin Thorstensson
Ireland	Gary Cullen, Eamon Brady, Michael Hoey, Garth McGimpsey, Ciaran McMonagle
Italy	Joachim Hassan, Roberto Paolillo, Stefano Reale, Michele Rigone, Massimiliano Secci, Andrea Zanini
Netherlands	Maarten van den Berg, Tim Nijenhuis, Robin Swane, Hiddo Uhlenbeck, Guido van der Valk, Inder van Weerelt
Norway	Lars Petter Brovold, Knut Ekjord, Peter Kensche, Jan Arne Larsen, Ørjan Larsen, Knut Schiager
Portugal	Nuno Campino, José Maria Cazal-Ribeiro, Stephane Castro Ferreira, Hugo Santos, Ricardo Soares, Filipe Tavares
Scotland	Graham Fox, Lorne Kelly, Simon MacKenzie, David Patrick, Graham Rankin, Craig Watson
Spain	Roger Albiñana, Jacobo Cestino, Carlos de Corral, Alejandro Larrazábal, Raúl Quirós, Oscar Sanchez
Sweden	Niclas Bruzelius, Anders Hultman, Linus Pettersson, Jonas Runnqvist, Rickard Sundgren, Jonas Wahlstedt
Switzerland	Franco Casellini, Alexandre Chopard, Julien Clement, Thomas Gottstein, Gregory Serex, Ronnie Zimmermann
Wales	Ian Campbell, Jamie Donaldson, Nigel Edwards, Lee Harpin, Neil Matthews, Craig Williams

== Winners ==
Team France won the opening 36-hole competition, with a 19-under-par score of 701, 10 strokes ahead of eight-time-winners England on 2nd place. Neither four-times-champions Scotland or two-times-champions Sweden did make it to the quarter-finals, finishing tied ninth.

There was no official award for the lowest individual score, but individual leader was Sebastian Branger, France, with an 8-under-par score of 136, one stroke ahead of Lorne Kelly, Scotland.

Host nation Italy won the gold medal, earning their first title, beating team Germany in the final 4–3.

Team France earned the bronze on third place, after beating England 3–2 in the bronze match.

== Results ==
Qualification round

Team standings

Place	Country	Score	To par
1	France	344-357=701	−19
2	England	359-252=711	−9
3	Germany	356-357=713	−7
4	Denmark	358-359=717	−3
5	Italy	362-356=718	−2
T6	Wales *	362-357=719	−1
T6	Ireland	361-358=719	−1
8	Spain	362-360=722	+2
9	Sweden *	368-355=723	+3
9	Scotland	367-356=723	+3
11	Portugal	365-365=730	+10
12	Finland *	370-361=731	+11
12	Netherlands	369-367=736	+11
14	Norway	370-366=736	+16
14	Switzerland	369-367=736	+16
16	Austria	374-368=742	+22
17	Belgium	368-376=744	+24
18	Iceland	402-376=778	+58
19	Czech Republic	392-390=782	+62
20	Greece	408-402=810	+90
21	Estonia	426-416=842	+122
22	Croatia	448-435=883	+163

* Note: In the event of a tie the order was determined by the best total of the two non-counting scores of the two rounds.

Individual leaders

Place	Player	Country	Score	To par
1	Sebastian Branger	France	65-71=136	−8
2	Lorne Kelly	Scotland	69-68=137	−7
T3	Luke Donald	England	68-70=138	−6
T3	Grégory Havret	France	68-70=138	−6
T5	Garth McGimpsey	Ireland	72-67=139	−5
T5	Stefano Reale	Italy	75-79=154	−5
T5	Tino Schuster	Germany	74-80=154	−5
T5	Gary Wolstenholme	England	78-76=154	−5
9	Thomas Havemann	Denmark	71-69=140	−4
T10	Olivier David	France	70-71=141	−3
T10	Lee Harpin	Wales	73-68=141	−3
T10	Joachim Hassan	Italy	69-72=141	−3
T10	Allan Madsen	Denmark	69-72=141	−3
T10	Nicolas Marin	France	70-71=141	−3
T10	Roberto Paolillo	Italy	70-71=141	−3
T10	Raul Quiros	Spain	69-72=141	−3
T10	Rickard Sundgren	Sweden	70-71=141	−3

Note: There was no official award for the lowest individual score.

Flight A

Bracket

Quarter finals
England	4.5
Ireland	2.5
Germany	5
Wales	2
Italy	5
Denmark	2
France	4
Spain	3

Semi finals
Germany	4
England	3
Italy	5
France	2

Final
Italy	4
Germany	3
Bronze match
France	5
England	2

Elimination matches
Ireland	4
Wales	1
Spain	3
Denmark	2

Match for 5th place
Spain	3
Ireland	2
Match for 7th place
Denmark	3
Wales	2

Final games

Italy	Germany
4	3
R. Paolillo / S. Reale 1 hole	M. Siem / J.M. Pelz
J. Hassan / M. Secci 21st hole	M. Thannhäuser / T. Schuster
Michele Rigone	Marcel Siem 2 & 1
Massimilano Secci	Tino Schuster 5 & 4
Joachim Hassan 2 & 1	Benjamin Schlichting
Stefano Reale 5 & 4	Kariem Baraka
Roberto Paolillo 2 & 1	Michael Thannhäuser

Flight B

Bracket

Round 1
Scotland	4.5
Switzerland	0.5
Portugal	4
Norway	1
Netherlands	3
Finland	2
Austria	3
Sweden	2

Round 2
Scotland	5
Portugal	0
Netherlands	5
Austria	0

Match for 9th place
Scotland	3
Netherlands	2
Match for 11th place
Austria	4
Portugal	2

Elimination matches
Switzerland	3
Norway	2
Sweden	4
Finland	1

Match for 13th place
Sweden	3
Switzerland	2
Match for 15th place
Norway	3
Finland	2

Flight C

Bracket

Round 1
Estonia	3.5
Greece	1.5
Czech Republic	4
Croatia	1

Round 2
Belgium	5
Estonia	0
Iceland	3.5
Czech Republic	1.5

Match for 17th place
Belgium	3
Iceland	2
Match for 19th place
Czech Republic	5
Estonia	0

Round 1

Match for 21st place
Croatia	5
Greece	0

Final standings

Place	Country
1st place, gold medalist(s)	Italy
2nd place, silver medalist(s)	Germany
3rd place, bronze medalist(s)	France
4	England
5	Spain
6	Ireland
7	Denmark
8	Wales
9	Scotland
10	Netherlands
11	Austria
12	Portugal
13	Sweden
14	Switzerland
15	Norway
16	Finland
17	Belgium
18	Iceland
19	Czech Republic
20	Estonia
21	Croatia
22	Greece

== See also ==
- Eisenhower Trophy – biennial world amateur team golf championship for men organized by the International Golf Federation.
- European Ladies' Team Championship – European amateur team golf championship for women organised by the European Golf Association.
