= Gary Wolstenholme =

English professional golfer

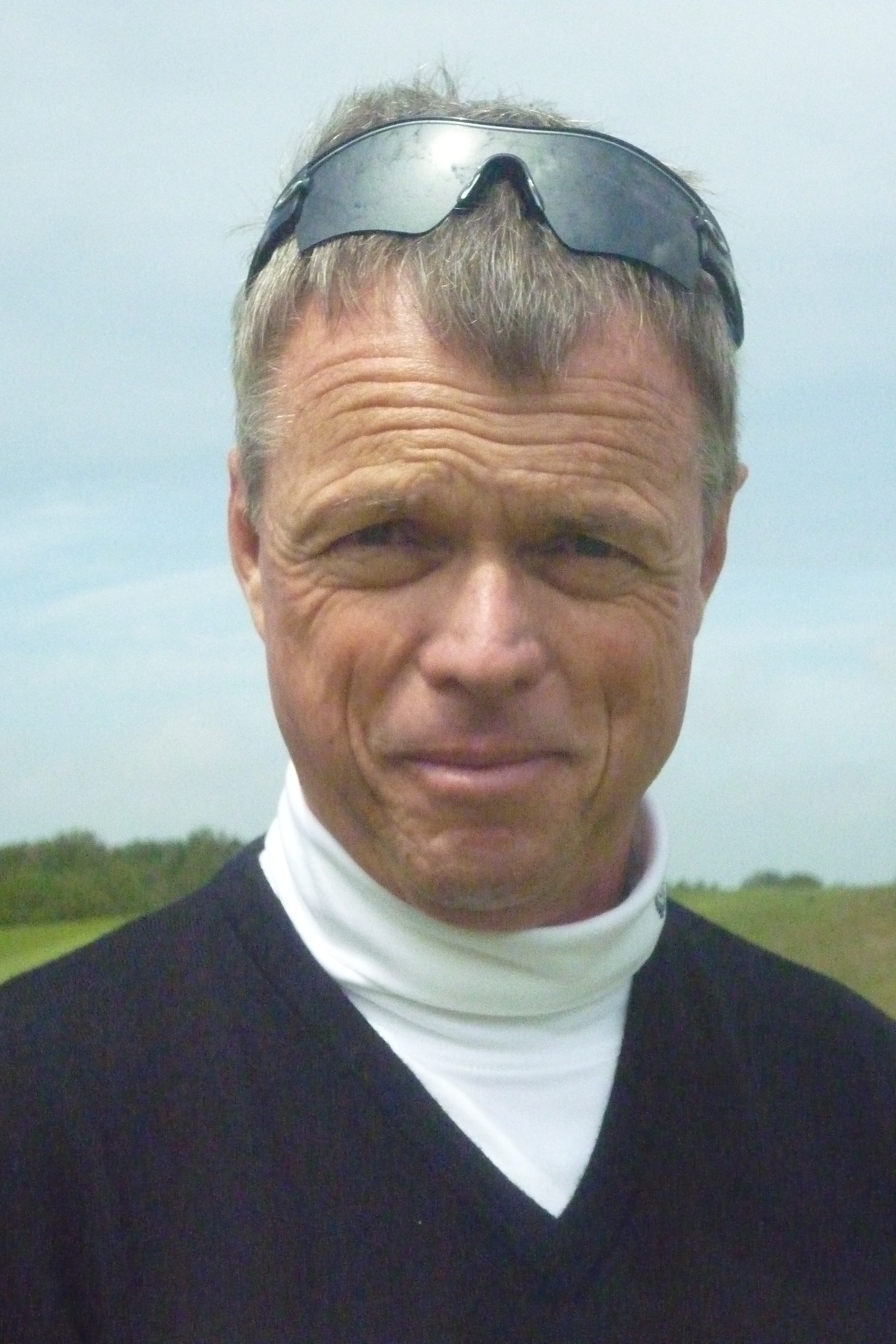

Personal information
- Full name: Gary P. Wolstenholme
- Nationality: England
- Born: 21 August 1960 (age 66) Egham, Surrey, England
- Height: 1.91 m (6 ft 3 in)
- Weight: 92 kg (203 lb; 14.5 st)

Career
- Sport: Golf
- Turned professional: 2008
- Current tours: European Senior Tour; Champions Tour
- Professional wins: 5

Number of wins by tour
- European Senior Tour: 3
- Other: 2

Best results in major championships
- Masters Tournament: CUT: 1992, 2004
- PGA Championship: DNP
- U.S. Open: CUT: 2008
- The Open Championship: CUT: 1992, 2003

Achievements and awards
- European Senior Tour Rookie of the Year: 2011

Gary P. Wolstenholme MBE (born 21 August 1960) is an English professional golfer. Wolstenholme is known for his long amateur career and now plays on the European Senior Tour.

== Early life and amateur career ==
Wolstenholme was born in Egham, Surrey. His father was Guy Wolstenholme a professional golfer. He has won The Amateur Championship twice (1991, 2003) as well as many other amateur tournaments around the world. He has played on six Walker Cup teams and is the all-time points leader for the Great Britain and Ireland side.

== Professional career ==
In September 2008, at the age of 48, Wolstenholme turned professional in anticipation of playing senior professional golf in 2010. He attempted to qualify for the European Tour through qualifying school, but failed to advance past the first stage.

Playing on the European Senior Tour, Wolstenholme has won three events: the 2010 Casa Serena Open, 2012 Mallorca Open Senior and the 2012 Benahavis Senior Masters.

== Amateur wins ==
- 1986 Midland Open Amateur Championship, Midland Closed Amateur Championship
- 1987 West of England Open Amateur Stroke Play Championship
- 1989 Golf Illustrated Gold Vase
- 1991 The Amateur Championship
- 1993 Chinese Amateur
- 1994 Duncan Putter, English County Champion of Champions
- 1995 United Arab Emirates Amateur, British Mid-Amateur
- 1996 British Mid-Amateur, Finnish Amateur Championship, Berkshire Trophy, Duncan Putter, English County Champion of Champions
- 1997 Welsh Amateur, Berkshire Trophy, Hampshire Hog
- 1998 British Mid-Amateur, St Mellion International Amateur, English County Champion of Champions
- 1999 Berkhamsted Trophy, Duncan Putter
- 2000 Sherry Cup
- 2001 Selborne Salver, Hampshire Salver, Sherry Cup, English County Champion of Champions
- 2002 South African Amateur Stroke Play, Berkhamsted Trophy, Hampshire Hog, Berkshire Trophy, Lagonda Trophy, Midland Open Amateur Championship
- 2003 The Amateur Championship, Scottish Amateur Stroke Play Championship, Sherry Cup
- 2005 New South Wales Medal, Sherry Cup
- 2006 European Mid-Amateur, South of England Open Amateur Championship, St Mellion International Amateur
- 2007 European Mid-Amateur, New South Wales Amateur
- 2008 Lee Westwood Trophy

== Professional wins (5) ==
=== PGA EuroPro Tour wins (1) ===
No.	Date	Tournament	Winning score	Margin of victory	Runners-up
1	1 Jul 2010	Stoke by Nayland	−15 (69-63-69=201)	4 strokes	(England) James Busby, (Republic of Ireland) Brendan McCarroll

=== European Senior Tour wins (3) ===
No.	Date	Tournament	Winning score	Margin of victory	Runner(s)-up
1	19 Sep 2010	Casa Serena Open	−13 (66-67-67=200)	3 strokes	(Scotland) Gordon Brand Jnr
2	13 May 2012	Mallorca Open Senior	−8 (70-66-69=205)	2 strokes	(Australia) Mike Harwood, (England) Paul Wesselingh, (South Africa) Chris Williams
3	3 Jun 2012	Benahavis Senior Masters	−13 (67-67-66=200)	1 stroke	(England) Mark James, (Wales) Mark Mouland

European Senior Tour playoff record (0–1)

No.	Year	Tournament	Opponents	Result
1	2016	Acorn Jersey Open	(Austria) Gordon Manson, (Wales) Ian Woosnam	Manson won with birdie on third extra hole

=== PGA of Australia Legends Tour wins (1) ===
- 2011 Handa Australian Senior Open

== Results in major championships ==
Tournament	1992	1993	1994	1995	1996	1997	1998	1999	2000	2001	2002	2003	2004	2005	2006	2007	2008
Masters Tournament	CUT												CUT				
U.S. Open																	CUT
The Open Championship	CUT											CUT					

Note: Wolstenholme never played in the PGA Championship.

Did not play

CUT = missed the half-way cut

== Team appearances ==
Amateur

- European Amateur Team Championship (representing England): 1995, 1997, 1999, 2001, 2003, 2005 (winners), 2007
- Walker Cup (representing Great Britain & Ireland): 1995 (winners), 1997, 1999 (winners), 2001 (winners), 2003 (winners), 2005
- St Andrews Trophy (representing Great Britain & Ireland): 1992 (winners), 1994 (winners), 1996 (winners), 1998, 2000 (winners), 2002 (winners), 2004 (winners)
- Eisenhower Trophy (representing Great Britain & Ireland): 1996, 1998 (winners)
- Eisenhower Trophy (representing England): 2002, 2004
- Bonallack Trophy (representing Europe): 1998 (winners), 2000 (winners), 2004, 2006 (winners)
