= Bob Lewis (golfer) =

American golfer (1944–2021)

Personal information
- Full name: Robert C. Lewis, Jr.
- Nationality: United States
- Born: July 12, 1944 Warren, Ohio, U.S.
- Died: March 23, 2021 (aged 76)

Career
- Sport: Golf
- College: Rollins College
- Status: Amateur; Professional (c.1970–1978)
- Former tour: PGA Tour
- Professional wins: 1

Best results in major championships
- Masters Tournament: T40: 1981
- PGA Championship: DNP
- U.S. Open: CUT: 1978, 1983, 1986
- The Open Championship: DNP

Achievements and awards
- Bob Jones Award: 2021

Robert C. Lewis, Jr. (July 12, 1944 – March 23, 2021) was an American amateur golfer from Pepper Pike, Ohio.

== Early life and amateur career ==
Lewis was born in Warren, Ohio. He played college golf at Rollins College, graduating in 1967. He won the 1968 Ohio Amateur on his 24th birthday.

== Professional career ==
Lewis turned professional and played on the PGA Tour from 1971 to 1974 without much success.

== Re-instated amateur status ==
Lewis then quit professional golf and had his amateur status reinstated.

As an amateur, Lewis finished runner-up at the 1980 U.S. Amateur and the 1981 and 1984 U.S. Mid-Amateurs. He played on four straight U.S. Walker Cup teams (1981, 1983, 1985, 1987) – all winners. He played on the winning 1982 Eisenhower Trophy team and the 1986 team that finished second.

Lewis captained the 2003 and 2005 Walker Cup teams.

== Personal life ==
Lewis died on March 23, 2021, from lung cancer.

== Awards and honors ==
- In 2002, Lewis was inducted into the Ohio Golf Association Hall of Fame.
- In 2003, he earned entry into the Northern Ohio Golf Association Hall of Fame.

== Tournament wins ==
this list may be incomplete

- 1968 Ohio Amateur
- 1978 Ohio Open (as amateur)
- 1987 Northeast Amateur

== Results in major championships ==
Tournament	1978	1979	1980	1981	1982	1983	1984	1985	1986	1987	1988
Masters Tournament				T40	CUT	CUT	T41		CUT	54LA	CUT
U.S. Open	CUT					CUT			CUT		

Note: Lewis only played in the Masters Tournament and the U.S. Open.

Did not play

LA = Low amateur
CUT = missed the half-way cut
"T" = tied

== U.S. national team appearances ==
Amateur

- Walker Cup: 1981 (winners), 1983 (winners), 1985 (winners), 1987 (winners), 2003 (non-playing captain), 2005 (non-playing captain, winners)
- Eisenhower Trophy: 1982 (winners), 1986

== See also ==
- 1970 PGA Tour Qualifying School graduates
