= Steven O'Hara =

Scottish golfer

Personal information
- Full name: Steven Owen O'Hara
- Nationality: Scotland
- Born: 17 July 1980 (age 46) Bellshill, Scotland
- Height: 6 ft 2 in (1.88 m)
- Weight: 168 lb (76 kg; 12.0 st)
- Spouse: Jill
- Children: 1

Career
- Sport: Golf
- Turned professional: 2001
- Former tours: European Tour; Challenge Tour

Best results in major championships
- Masters Tournament: DNP
- PGA Championship: DNP
- U.S. Open: DNP
- The Open Championship: CUT: 2012

Steven Owen O'Hara (born 17 July 1980) is a Scottish professional golfer.

== Early life and amateur career ==
O'Hara was born in Bellshill, and started playing golf at 7 years of age at Calderbraes Golf Club before moving to Colville Park GC. O'Hara's younger brother Paul (born 1986) is also a professional golfer.

O'Hara had a successful amateur career which included winning the Scottish Amateur in 2000 and the St Andrews Links Trophy in 2001.

== Professional career ==
In 2001, O'Hara turned professional after being part of the Scottish team winning the 2001 European Amateur Team Championship and a member of the first Great Britain and Ireland team to retain the Walker Cup, alongside future stars such as Luke Donald and Graeme McDowell.

After earning his card at qualifying school at the end of 2003, he competed on the European Tour, except for 2008 when he dropped down to the second tier Challenge Tour. O'Hara failed to regain his full playing rights on the European Tour for 2013 and failed to qualify for the final stages of Q-School.

== Amateur wins ==
- 1998 Boys Amateur Championship, Scottish Boys Championship
- 2000 Scottish Amateur Championship
- 2001 St Andrews Links Trophy

== Results in major championships ==
Tournament	2012
The Open Championship	CUT

Note: O'Hara only played in The Open Championship.
CUT = missed the half-way cut

== Team appearances ==
Amateur

- Jacques Léglise Trophy (representing Great Britain & Ireland): 1998 (winners)
- European Youths' Team Championship (representing Scotland): 2000
- Eisenhower Trophy (representing Great Britain & Ireland): 2000
- St Andrews Trophy (representing Great Britain & Ireland): 2000 (winners)
- European Amateur Team Championship (representing Scotland): 2001 (winners)
- Walker Cup (representing Great Britain & Ireland): 2001 (winners)

== See also ==
- 2008 Challenge Tour graduates
- 2009 European Tour Qualifying School graduates
- 2011 European Tour Qualifying School graduates
