= Spider Miller =

American amateur golfer (born 1950)

Personal information
- Full name: John Miller
- Nickname: Spider
- Nationality: United States
- Born: c. 1950 North Vernon, Indiana

Career
- Sport: Golf
- Status: Amateur

Best results in major championships
- Masters Tournament: CUT: 1997, 1999
- PGA Championship: DNP
- U.S. Open: DNP
- The Open Championship: DNP

John "Spider" Miller (born c. 1950) is an American amateur golfer. He represented the United States in the 1999 Walker Cup and was the captain of the team in 2015 and 2017. He won the U.S. Mid-Amateur in 1996 and 1998. Miller owns Best Beers, Inc and is married with five children.

== U.S. national team appearances ==
- Walker Cup: 1999, 2015 (non-playing captain), 2017 (non-playing captain, winners)
