= 2001 European Amateur Team Championship =

Golf competition

Tournament information
- Dates: 3–7 July 2001
- Location: Höllviken, Sweden; 55°24′N 12°55′E
- Course: Ljunghusen Golf Club
- Organized by: European Golf Association
- Format: Qualification round: 36 holes stroke play Knock-out match-play

Statistics
- Par: 71
- Length: 6,447 yards (5,895 m)
- Field: 23 teams 138 players

Champion
- Scotland; Craig Heap, Barry Hume, Simon Mackenzie, Steven O'Hara, Marc Warren, Craig Watson
- Qualification round: 720 (+10); Final match: 5–2

Location map
- Location in Europe Location in Sweden Location in Scania province

The 2001 European Amateur Team Championship took place 3–7 July at Ljunghusen Golf Club in Höllviken, Sweden. It was the 22nd men's golf European Amateur Team Championship.

== Venue ==
The club was founded in 1932 and by 1965 it was the first golf club in Scandinavia to feature 27 holes, one of three clubs with links courses at the south west tip of Sweden, in Vellinge Municipality, Scania County. The championship was played at holes 1–18, set up with par 71 (after the tournament changed to 72).

== Format ==
Each team consisted of six players, playing two rounds of an opening stroke-play qualifying competition over two days, counting the five best scores each day for each team.

The eight best teams formed flight A, in knock-out match-play over the next three days. The teams were seeded based on their positions after the stroke play. The first placed team were drawn to play the quarter-final against the eight placed team, the second against the seventh, the third against the sixth and the fourth against the fifth. Teams were allowed to use six players during the team matches, selecting four of them in the two morning foursome games and five players in to the afternoon single games. Games all square at the 18th hole were declared halved, if the team match was already decided. The elimination matches and the bronze match were decided with one foursome game and four single games.

The eight teams placed 9–16 in the qualification stroke-play formed flight B and the seven teams placed 17–23 formed flight C, to play similar knock-out play, with one foursome game and four single games in each match, to decide their final positions.

== Teams ==
A record number of 23 nation teams contested the event. A team representing Slovenia took part in the championship for the first time. Each team consisted of six players.

Players in the teams

Country	Players
Austria	Oliver Herti, Clemens Conrad Prader, Thomas Kogler, Michael Moser, Martin Wiegele, Matthias Wittmann
Belgium	Stefan Boschmans, Gerald Gresse, Francois Nicolas, Pierre Thomas, Aubin van Waetermeulen, Thomas van Wettere
Croatia	Dragutin Kasapovic, Nicola Kovacevic, Vanja Nikolic, Miroslav Raic, Branko Stoter, Ivo Vokadin
Czech Republic	Lukas Basler, Miroslav Holub, Petr Nic, Martin Peterka, Roman Svoboda, Petr Skopovy
Denmark	Christian Bindslev, Anders Bruun, Anders Schmidt Hansen, Allan Madsen, Fredrik Jacob Neltoft, Alexander Renard
England	Graeme Clark, Luke Donald, Nick Dougherty, Jamie Elson, Richard McEvoy, Gary Wolstenholme
Estonia	Andreas Hiis, Jaan Martinson, Marko Palm, Raimond Palm, Mait Schmidt, Philip Verzun
Finland	Toni Karjalainen, Panu Kylliäinen, Janne Mommo, Ari Savolainen, Thomas Sundström, Tuomas Tuovinen
France	Olivier Chabaud, François Delamontagne, Bruno Lecuona, Philippe Lima, Charles-Henry Quelin, Charles Russo
Germany	Manuel Kempe, Andre Kruse, Benjamin Miarka, Christian Reimbold, Helge Schmedt, Markus Zoller
Greece	Christis Diakov, Christos Nikopoulos, Cassimis Orestis, Steve Parthenis, Evangelos Ginnis
Ireland	Stephen Browne, Noel Fox, Michael Hoey, Graeme McDowell, Michael McDermott, Tim Rice
Iceland	Björgium Sigurbergsson, Ólafur Már Sigurðsson, Helgi Pórisson, Örn Ævar Hjartarson, Haraldur Heimisson, Ottó Sigurdsson
Italy	Simone Brizzocari, Stefano Mali, Edoardo Molinari, Francesco Molinari, Michele Rigone, Massimiliano Secci
Netherlands	Maarten van den Berg, Rutger Buschow, Alai Ruiz-Fonhof, Hiddo Uhlenbeck, Guido van der Valk, Inder van Weerelt
Norway	Lars Petter Brovold, Jan Arne Larsen, Eirik-Tage Johansen, Torstein Nevestad, Arn Sverre Salvesvoll, Knut Schlager
Portugal	Nuno Campino, Tiago Cruz, Romeo Goncalves, Hugo Santos, Ricardo Soares, Jorge Rodrigues
Scotland	Craig Heap, Barry Hume, Simon Mackenzie, Steven O'Hara, Marc Warren, Craig Watson
Slovenia	Miran Babnik, Matjaz Gojcic, Matjaz Gojcic, Ales Gregoric, Uros Gregoric, Miha Studen
Spain	Rafa Cabrera-Bello, Carlos de Corral, Gonzalo Fernández-Castaño, Alfredo Garcia, Alejandro Larrazábal, Inaki Alustiza
Sweden	Niclas Bruzelius, Lars Johansson, Pär Nilsson, Linus Pettersson, Wilhelm Schauman, Rickard Sundgren,
Switzerland	Julien Clement, Raphael de Sousa, Bilbp Perrot, Martin Rominger, Nicolas Sulzer, Ronnie Zimmermann
Wales	Ian Campbell, Nigel Edwards, Matthew Griffiths, Lee Harpin, Kyron Sullivan, Craig Williams

== Winners ==
Eight-time-winners team England won the opening 36-hole competition, with a 25-under-par score of 685, 14 strokes ahead of team Ireland on 2nd place and host nation Sweden another eight strokes behind. Neither former champions Spain or two-times-silver medalists France did make it to the quarter-finals, finishing ninth and tied tenth respectively.

There was no official award for the lowest individual score, but individual leader was Rickard Sundgren, Sweden, with an 11-under-par score of 131, two strokes ahead of Nick Dougherty, England. Sundgren was a substitute player, replacing Anders Hultman in the Swedish team just before the start of the tournament.

Luke Donald, England shot a new course record, with an 8-under-par-score of 63 in his first 18-hole round, including 8 birdies and 10 par.

Team Scotland won the gold medal, earning their fifth title, beating team Ireland in the final 5–2.

Team England earned the bronze on third place, after beating Iceland 4–1 in the bronze match. Iceland reached the semi-finals for the first time in the history of the championship, after beating host nation Sweden in the quarter-finals.

== Results ==
Qualification round

Team standings

Place	Country	Score	To par
1	England	339-346=685	−25
2	Ireland	339-360=699	−11
3	Sweden	347-360=707	−3
4	Finland	353-362=715	+5
5	Scotland	356-364=720	+10
T6	Iceland *	356-366=722	+12
T6	Germany *	360-362=722	+12
T6	Wales	353-369=722	+12
9	Spain	359-367=726	+16
T10	Switzerland *	361-366=727	+17
T10	France	357-370=727	+17
12	Netherlands	356-373=729	+19
13	Denmark	360-370=730	+20
14	Italy	362-369=731	+21
15	Austria	356-377=733	+23
16	Portugal	373-372=745	+35
17	Norway	374-380=754	+44
18	Belgium	380-381=761	+51
19	Czech Republic	384-396=780	+70
20	Slovenia	396-402=798	+88
21	Greece	403-401=804	+94
22	Estonia	409-429=838	+128
23	Croatia	417-431=848	+138

* Note: In the event of a tie the order was determined by the best total of the two non-counting scores of the two rounds.

Individual leaders

Place	Player	Country	Score	To par
1	Rickard Sundgren	Sweden	65-66=131	−11
2	Nick Dougherty	England	69-65=134	−8
3	Luke Donald	England	63-72=135	−7
4	Stephen Browne	Ireland	69-68=136	−6
5	Philippe Lima	France	67-70=137	−5
T6	Jamie Elson	England	69-69=138	−4
T6	Björgium Sigurbergsson	Iceland	70-68=138	−4
T8	Michael Hoey	Ireland	69-70=139	−3
T8	Richard McEvoy	England	69-70=139	−3
T8	Francesco Molinari	Italy	69-70=139	−3
T8	Gary Wolstenholme	England	69-70=139	−3

Note: There was no official award for the lowest individual score.

Flight A

Bracket

Quarter finals
Ireland	5
Germany	2
Iceland	4
Sweden	3
Scotland	4.5
Finland	2.5
England	6
Wales	1

Semi finals
Ireland	5
Iceland	2
Scotland	4
England	3

Final
Scotland	5
Ireland	2
Bronze match
England	4
Iceland	1

Elimination matches
Germany	3
Sweden	2
Wales	3.5
Finland	1.5

Match for 5th place
Wales	3
Germany	2
Match for 7th place
Finland	4
Sweden	1

Final games

Scotland	Ireland
5	2
B. Hume / S. O’Hara 20th hole	M. Hoey / G. McDowell
M. Warren / C. Heap 2 holes	S. Brownie / N. Fox
Barry Hume 4 & 3	Michael Hoey
Steven O’Hara 8 & 7	Noel Fox
Marc Warren	Graeme McDowell 1 hole
Simon Mackenzie AS *	Tim Rice AS *
Craig Watson AS *	Stephen Browne AS *

* Note: Game declared halved, since team match already decided.

Flight B

Bracket

Round 1
Switzerland	4
Austria	1
France	3.5
Italy	1.5
Netherlands	3
Denmark	2
Spain	4
Portugal	1

Round 2
Switzerland	3
France	2
Spain	4.5
Netherlands	0.5

Match for 9th place
Spain	5
Switzerland	0
Match for 11th place
France	3
Netherlands	2

Elimination matches
Austria	4
Italy	1
Denmark	4.5
Portugal	0.5

Match for 13th place
Denmark	3.5
Austria	1.5
Match for 15th place
Italy	3
Portugal	2

Flight C

Bracket

Round 1
Czech Republic	4.5
Croatia	0.5
Slovenia	3.5
Estonia	1.5

Round 2
Belgium	4
Czech Republic	1
Norway	4
Slovenia	1

Match for 17th place
Norway	3
Belgium	2
Match for 19th place
Czech Republic	4.5
Slovenia	0.5

Elimination match
Croatia	3.5
Greece	1.5

Match for 21st place
Croatia	3
Estonia	2

Final standings

Place	Country
1st place, gold medalist(s)	Scotland
2nd place, silver medalist(s)	Ireland
3rd place, bronze medalist(s)	England
4	Iceland
5	Wales
6	Germany
7	Finland
8	Sweden
9	Spain
10	Switzerland
11	France
12	Netherlands
13	Denmark
14	Austria
15	Italy
16	Portugal
17	Norway
18	Belgium
19	Czech Republic
20	Slovenia
21	Croatia
22	Estonia
23	Greece

== See also ==
- European Golf Association – Organizer of European amateur golf championships
- Eisenhower Trophy – biennial world amateur team golf championship for men organized by the International Golf Federation.
- European Ladies' Team Championship – European amateur team golf championship for women organised by the European Golf Association.
