= Craig Watson (golfer) =

Scottish golfer

Personal information
- Full name: Craig Robert Watson
- Nationality: Scotland
- Born: 1966 (age 59–60) Glasgow, Scotland

Career
- Sport: Golf
- Status: Amateur

Best results in major championships
- Masters Tournament: CUT: 1998
- PGA Championship: DNP
- U.S. Open: DNP
- The Open Championship: CUT: 1997
- British Amateur: Won: 1997

Craig Robert Watson (born 1966) is a Scottish amateur golfer. He won the 1997 Amateur Championship and was in the British Walker Cup team that year. He was the original captain of the 2017 Walker Cup Great Britain and Ireland team but withdrew just before the event because of a family illness. He was the captain of the 2019 Walker Cup team.

== Amateur wins ==
- 1992 St Andrews Links Trophy
- 1997 Amateur Championship
- 1998 St Andrews Links Trophy

== Major championships ==
=== Wins (1) ===
Year	Championship	Winning score	Runner-up
1997	Amateur Championship	3 & 2	(South Africa) Trevor Immelman

== Team appearances ==
=== Amateur ===
- European Amateur Team Championship (representing Scotland): 1997, 1999, 2001 (winners), 2003
- Walker Cup (representing Great Britain and Ireland): 1997, 2017 (non-playing captain, withdrew), 2019 (non-playing captain)
- St Andrews Trophy (representing Great Britain and Ireland): 1998, 2016 (non-playing captain, tie), 2018 (non-playing captain)
