= Nairn Golf Club =

Golf course in Nairn, Scotland

Coordinates: 57.587°N 3.895°W

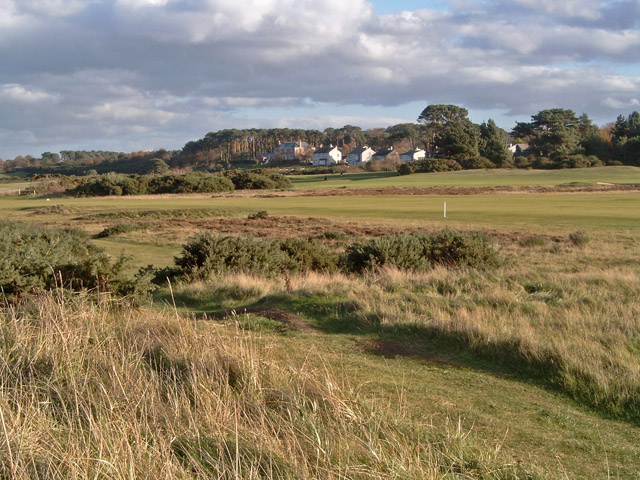
Fairways overlooking the Nairn Golf Club

Nairn Golf Club is a golf course in Nairn, Scotland.

The Nairn Golf Club is noted for hosting the 1999 Walker Cup, 2004 Jacques Léglise Trophy, 2012 Curtis Cup, and the 2021 Amateur Championship.
