= 1997 Walker Cup =

Golf tournament

36th Walker Cup Match
- Dates: August 9–10, 1997
- Venue: Quaker Ridge Golf Club
- Location: Scarsdale, New York
- Captains: Downing Gray (USA); Clive Brown (GB&I)
(United States)	18	6	(United Kingdom) (Republic of Ireland)
- United States wins the Walker Cup

The 1997 Walker Cup, the 36th Walker Cup Match, was played on August 9 and 10, 1997, at Quaker Ridge Golf Club in Scarsdale, New York. The event was won by the United States 18 to 6.

== Format ==
The format for play on Saturday and Sunday was the same. There were four matches of foursomes in the morning and eight singles matches in the afternoon. In all, 24 matches were played.

Each of the 24 matches is worth one point in the larger team competition. If a match is all square after the 18th hole, extra holes are not played. Rather, each side earns ½ a point toward their team total. The team that accumulates at least 12½ points wins the competition. If the two teams are tied, the previous winner retains the trophy.

== Teams ==
Ten players for the USA and Great Britain & Ireland participate in the event plus one non-playing captain for each team.

& Team Great Britain & Ireland
Name	Age	Hometown	Notes
(Wales) Clive Brown	45	Gwynedd, Wales	non-playing captain
(Scotland) Michael Brooks	25	Lanark, Scotland
(Republic of Ireland) Richie Coughlan	23	Birr, County Offaly, Ireland
(Scotland) Barclay Howard	44	Johnstone, Scotland	Low amateur in the 1995 Open Championship; played in 1995 Walker Cup
(Republic of Ireland) Keith Nolan	24	Bray, Ireland
(Wales) David Park	23	Credenhill, Wales
(Scotland) Graham Rankin	31	Airdrie, Scotland	Played in the 1995 Walker Cup
(England) Justin Rose	17	Hook, Hart, England	Youngest player to ever compete in Walker Cup
(Scotland) Craig Watson	31	Glasgow, Scotland	Won the 1997 Amateur Championship
(England) Gary Wolstenholme	36	Market Harborough, England	Played in the 1995 Walker Cup
(Scotland) Steven Young	20	Inverallochy, Scotland

Team USA
Name	Age	Hometown	Notes
Downing Gray	58	Pensacola, Florida	non-playing captain
Jerry Courville Jr.	38	Milford, Connecticut	1995 U.S. Mid-Amateur champion
Duke Delcher	41	Hilton Head Island, South Carolina
Brad Elder	22	Overland Park, Kansas
Jason Gore	23	Valencia, California	Won 1997 California Amateur and California Open
John Harris	45	Edina, Minnesota	1993 U.S. Amateur champion; played in 1993 Walker Cup
Joel Kribel	20	Pleasanton, California
Randy Leen	21	Dayton, Ohio
Buddy Marucci	45	Malvern, Pennsylvania	Played in 1995 Walker Cup; 1995 U.S. Amateur runner-up
Steve Scott	19	Coral Springs, Florida	1996 U.S. Amateur runner-up
Chris Wollmann	22	Parma, Ohio	1995 U.S. Amateur Public Links champion

== Saturday's matches ==
=== Morning foursomes ===
&	Results
Howard/Young	(United States) 4 and 3	Elder/Kribel
Rose/Brooks	(United States) 5 and 4	Courville/Marucci
Wolstenholme/Nolan	(United States) 6 and 4	Gore/Harris
Coughlan/Park	(United States) 1 up	Leen/Wollmann
0	Foursomes	4
0	Overall	4

=== Afternoon singles ===
&	Results
Craig Watson	(United Kingdom) (Republic of Ireland) 1 up	Steve Scott
Steven Young	(United Kingdom) (Republic of Ireland) 5 and 4	Duke Delcher
Barclay Howard	(United States) 5 and 4	Brad Elder
Justin Rose	(United Kingdom) (Republic of Ireland) 1 up	Joel Kribel
Keith Nolan	(United States) 3 and 2	Randy Leen
Graham Rankin	(United States) 3 and 2	Jason Gore
Richie Coughlan	halved	Chris Wollmann
Gary Wolstenholme	(United States) 1 up	John Harris
3½	Singles	4½
3½	Overall	8½

== Sunday's matches ==
=== Morning foursomes ===
&	Results
Watson/Young	(United States) 3 and 2	Elder/Harris
Howard/Rankin	(United States) 5 and 4	Courville/Marucci
Coughlan/Park	(United States) 1 up	Delcher/Scott
Wolstenholme/Rose	(United Kingdom) (Republic of Ireland) 2 and 1	Leen/Wollmann
1	Foursomes	3
4½	Overall	11½

=== Afternoon singles ===
&	Results
Steven Young	(United Kingdom) (Republic of Ireland) 2 and 1	Joel Kribel
Craig Watson	halved	Jason Gore
Justin Rose	(United States) 3 and 2	Jerry Courville
Keith Nolan	(United States) 2 and 1	Brad Elder
Michael Brooks	(United States) 6 and 5	John Harris
David Park	(United States) 4 and 3	Buddy Marucci
Gary Wolstenholme	(United States) 2 and 1	Duke Delcher
Richie Coughlan	(United States) 2 and 1	Steve Scott
1½	Singles	6½
6	Overall	18
