= 2011 Walker Cup =

Golf tournament

Coordinates: 57.1782°N 2.0837°W

43rd Walker Cup Match
- Dates: 10–11 September 2011
- Venue: Royal Aberdeen Golf Club
- Location: Aberdeen, Scotland
- Captains: Nigel Edwards (GB&I); Jim Holtgrieve (USA)
(United Kingdom) (Republic of Ireland)	14	12	(United States)
- Great Britain & Ireland wins the Walker Cup

The 43rd Walker Cup Match was played on 10 and 11 September 2011 at the Royal Aberdeen Golf Club in Aberdeen, Scotland, United Kingdom. Team Great Britain and Ireland won 14 to 12.

== Format ==
On Saturday, there are four matches of foursomes in the morning and eight singles matches in the afternoon. On Sunday, there are again four matches of foursomes in the morning, followed by ten singles matches (involving every player) in the afternoon. In all, 26 matches are played.

Each of the 26 matches is worth one point in the larger team competition. If a match is all square after the 18th hole extra holes are not played. Rather, each side earns ½ a point toward their team total. The team that accumulates at least 13½ points wins the competition. In the event of a tie, the previous winner retains the Cup.

== Course ==
The matches were played on the Balgownie Links of the Royal Aberdeen Golf Club in Aberdeen, Scotland, which is a par 71 course. The club was founded in 1780, and is the sixth-oldest golf club in the world. The club moved to the Balgownie Links in 1888, and has hosted a number of Scottish tournaments (including the Boys Amateur Championship) and the 2005 Senior British Open Championship. The club has one other course, named the Silverburn.

== Teams ==
Ten players for the US and Great Britain & Ireland participated in the event plus one non-playing captain for each team.

Team USA
Name	Rank	Age	Hometown	Notes
Jim Holtgrieve		63	St. Louis, Missouri	non-playing captain
Blayne Barber	51	21	Lake City, Florida	Won 2009 Florida State Amateur; member 2011 Palmer Cup team
Patrick Cantlay	1	19	Los Alamitos, California	Low amateur at 2011 U.S. Open
Harris English	6	22	Thomasville, Georgia	Won 2011 Children's Hospital Invitational
Russell Henley	20	22	Macon, Georgia	Won 2011 Stadion Classic; tied low amateur at 2010 U.S. Open
Kelly Kraft	12	22	Dallas, Texas	Won 2011 U.S. Amateur
Patrick Rodgers	3	18	Avon, Indiana	Won 2011 Porter Cup
Nathan Smith	108	33	Pittsburgh, Pennsylvania	Three-time U.S. Mid-Amateur winner; played 2009 Walker Cup
Jordan Spieth	2	18	Dallas, Texas	Won 2009 and 2011 U.S. Junior Amateur
Peter Uihlein	4	21	Orlando, Florida	Won 2010 U.S. Amateur; played 2009 Walker Cup
Chris Williams	10	20	Moscow, Idaho	Qualified for 2011 U.S. Open, won 2011 Pacific Coast Amateur

& Team Great Britain & Ireland
Name	Rank	Age	Hometown	Notes
(Wales) Nigel Edwards		43	Caerphilly, Wales	non-playing captain
(England) Steven Brown	23	24	Wentworth, England	Won 2011 English Amateur
(Scotland) James Byrne	66	22	Banchory, Scotland	Runner-up in 2010 Amateur Championship
(Northern Ireland) Paul Cutler	24	22	Portstewart, Northern Ireland	Won 2010 Lytham Trophy, 2011 Irish Amateur Close and West of Ireland
(Northern Ireland) Alan Dunbar	216	21	Rathmore, County Antrim, Northern Ireland	Won 2010 Irish Amateur Open and Northern Ireland Amateur
(England) Stiggy Hodgson	33	21	Sunningdale, England	Runner-up at 2011 Spanish Amateur; played 2009 Walker Cup
(England) Tom Lewis	7	20	Welwyn Garden City, England	Low amateur at 2011 Open Championship, led after first round
(Wales) Rhys Pugh	75	17	Vale of Glamorgan, Wales	Won 2011 Irish Amateur Open
(England) Jack Senior	11	23	Heysham, England	Won 2011 Lytham Trophy
(Scotland) Michael Stewart	14	21	Troon, Scotland	Runner-up in 2011 Amateur Championship
(England) Andy Sullivan	5	24	Nuneaton, England	Won 2011 Scottish Stroke Play; runner-up in 2011 Brabazon Trophy

Note: World Amateur Golf Ranking as of 4 September 2011.

== Saturday's matches ==
=== Morning foursomes ===
&	Results
Lewis/Stewart	(United Kingdom) (Republic of Ireland) 2 and 1	Uihlein/English
Senior/Sullivan	(United Kingdom) (Republic of Ireland) 2 and 1	Henley/Kraft
Cutler/Dunbar	(United Kingdom) (Republic of Ireland) 5 and 4	Smith/Barber
Brown/Hodgson	(United States) 5 and 3	Cantlay/Williams
3	Foursomes	1
3	Overall	1

=== Afternoon singles ===
&	Results
Tom Lewis	(United States) 2 and 1	Peter Uihlein
Jack Senior	(United States) 3 and 2	Jordan Spieth
Andy Sullivan	(United States) 2 and 1	Harris English
Rhys Pugh	(United Kingdom) (Republic of Ireland) 2 and 1	Patrick Rodgers
Steven Brown	(United Kingdom) (Republic of Ireland) 1 up	Russell Henley
James Byrne	(United Kingdom) (Republic of Ireland) 2 and 1	Nathan Smith
Paul Cutler	(United Kingdom) (Republic of Ireland) 2 and 1	Kelly Kraft
Michael Stewart	(United States) 2 and 1	Patrick Cantlay
4	Singles	4
7	Overall	5

== Sunday's matches ==
=== Morning foursomes ===
&	Results
Lewis/Stewart	halved	Spieth/Rodgers
Senior/Sullivan	(United Kingdom) (Republic of Ireland) 3 and 2	Uihlein/English
Cutler/Dunbar	(United Kingdom) (Republic of Ireland) 2 and 1	Kraft/Barber
Byrne/Pugh	(United Kingdom) (Republic of Ireland) 5 and 3	Cantlay/Williams
3½	Foursomes	½
10½	Overall	5½

=== Afternoon singles ===
&	Results
Tom Lewis	(United States) 4 and 2	Russell Henley
Andy Sullivan	(United States) 3 and 2	Jordan Spieth
Jack Senior	halved	Nathan Smith
Michael Stewart	(United Kingdom) (Republic of Ireland) 3 and 2	Patrick Rodgers
Stiggy Hodgson	(United States) 2 and 1	Peter Uihlein
Steven Brown	halved	Blayne Barber
Rhys Pugh	(United Kingdom) (Republic of Ireland) 2 and 1	Kelly Kraft
Alan Dunbar	(United States) 1 up	Chris Williams
James Byrne	(United States) 2 and 1	Harris English
Paul Cutler	halved	Patrick Cantlay
3½	Singles	6½
14	Overall	12
