= 2005 Walker Cup =

Golf tournament

Coordinates: 41.844757°N 88.116145°W

40th Walker Cup Match
- Dates: August 13–14, 2005
- Venue: Chicago Golf Club
- Location: Wheaton, Illinois
- Captains: Bob Lewis (USA); Garth McGimpsey (GB&I)
(United States)	12½	11½	(United Kingdom) (Republic of Ireland)
- United States wins the Walker Cup

The 40th Walker Cup Match was played on August 13 and 14, 2005 at the Chicago Golf Club in Wheaton, Illinois, United States. Team United States won 12½ to 11½.

== Format ==
The format for play on Saturday and Sunday are the same. There are four matches of foursomes in the morning and eight singles matches in the afternoon. In all, 24 matches are played. Each of the 24 matches is worth one point in the larger team competition. If a match is all square after the 18th hole extra holes are not played. Rather, each side earns ½ a point toward their team total. The team that accumulates at least 12½ points wins the competition.

== Teams ==
=== Team Great Britain & Ireland ===
&
Captain: (Northern Ireland) Garth McGimpsey

- (Wales) Rhys Davies
- (England) Robert Dinwiddie
- (Wales) Nigel Edwards
- (England) Oliver Fisher
- (England) Gary Lockerbie
- (Republic of Ireland) Brian McElhinney
- (Scotland) Richie Ramsay
- (England) Matthew Richardson
- (Scotland) Lloyd Saltman
- (England) Gary Wolstenholme

=== Team United States ===
Captain: Bob Lewis

- Matt Every
- Anthony Kim
- Brian Harman
- J. B. Holmes
- Billy Hurley III
- Jeff Overton
- Michael Putnam
- Kyle Reifers
- Nicholas Thompson
- Lee Williams

== Saturday's matches ==
=== Morning foursomes ===
&	Results
Edwards/Davies	halved	Kim/Harman
Lockerbie/Dinwiddie	(United States) 1 up	Williams/Every
Fisher/Richardson	(United States) 2 and 1	Overton/Putnam
Ramsay/Saltman	(United Kingdom) (Republic of Ireland) 4 and 3	Reifers/Hurley
1½	Foursomes	2½
1½	Overall	2½

=== Afternoon singles ===
&	Results
Rhys Davies	(United Kingdom) (Republic of Ireland) 4 and 3	Matthew Every
Gary Lockerbie	(United States) 6 and 5	Anthony Kim
Nigel Edwards	(United States) 5 and 4	Jeff Overton
Oliver Fisher	(United Kingdom) (Republic of Ireland) 2 up	Michael Putnam
Matthew Richardson	(United Kingdom) (Republic of Ireland) 5 and 4	Nicholas Thompson
Lloyd Saltman	(United Kingdom) (Republic of Ireland) 1 up	Billy Hurley III
Gary Wolstenholme	(United States) 1 up	J. B. Holmes
Brian McElhinney	(United States) 2 and 1	Lee Williams
4	Singles	4
5½	Overall	6½

== Sunday's matches ==
=== Morning foursomes ===
&	Results
Saltman/Ramsay	(United States) 4 and 2	Kim/Harman
Davies/Edwards	(United Kingdom) (Republic of Ireland) 2 and 1	Every/Williams
Fisher/Richardson	(United States) 2 and 1	Thompson/Holmes
Lockerbie/Dinwiddie	(United Kingdom) (Republic of Ireland) 5 and 3	Putnam/Overton
2	Foursomes	2
7½	Overall	8½

=== Afternoon singles ===
&	Results
Gary Wolstenholme	(United Kingdom) (Republic of Ireland) 1 up	Anthony Kim
Rhys Davies	(United States) 6 and 5	Brian Harman
Oliver Fisher	halved	Michael Putnam
Robert Dinwiddie	halved	Matthew Every
Matthew Richardson	(United Kingdom) (Republic of Ireland) 5 and 4	J. B. Holmes
Lloyd Saltman	(United Kingdom) (Republic of Ireland) 1 up	Kyle Reifers
Nigel Edwards	(United States) 1 up	Jeff Overton
Gary Lockerbie	(United States) 4 and 3	Lee Williams
4	Singles	4
11½	Overall	12½

== Venue ==
The Chicago Golf Club in Wheaton, Illinois is a par 70 course with a yardage of 6,782. World Golf Hall of Fame member Charles B. Macdonald is credited with designing the track. The course opened for play in 1894. In 1922, famed architect Seth Raynor made some revisions to the course. Chicago Golf Club has hosted various USGA events, including the 1897, 1900 and 1911 U.S. Open.
