= 1987 Walker Cup =

Golf tournament

31st Walker Cup Match
- Dates: 27–28 May 1987
- Venue: Sunningdale Golf Club
- Location: Sunningdale, Berkshire, England
- Captains: Geoff Marks (GB&I); Fred Ridley (USA)
(United Kingdom) (Republic of Ireland)	7½	16½	(United States)
- United States wins the Walker Cup

The 1987 Walker Cup, the 31st Walker Cup Match, was played on 27 and 28 May 1987, on the Old course at Sunningdale Golf Club, Sunningdale, Berkshire, England. The event was won by the United States 16½ to 7½, their eighth successive win.

The match was one-sided. The United States led 12–4 after the second day foursomes, already having retained the cup. They won 4 and halved one of the 8 remaining singles for their biggest win since 18 holes matches were introduced in 1963.

== Format ==
The format for play on Wednesday and Thursday was the same. There were four matches of foursomes in the morning and eight singles matches in the afternoon. In all, 24 matches were played.

Each of the 24 matches was worth one point in the larger team competition. If a match was all square after the 18th hole extra holes were not played. Rather, each side earned ½ a point toward their team total. The team that accumulated at least 12½ points won the competition. If the two teams were tied, the previous winner would retain the trophy.

== Teams ==
Ten players for the United States and Great Britain & Ireland participated in the event plus one non-playing captain for each team.

=== Great Britain & Ireland ===
&
Captain: (England) Geoff Marks

- (Scotland) David Carrick
- (England) David Curry
- (England) Bobby Eggo
- (Scotland) Paul Girvan
- (Scotland) George Macgregor
- (Wales) Paul Mayo
- (Republic of Ireland) John McHenry
- (Scotland) Colin Montgomerie
- (England) Jeremy Robinson
- (Scotland) Graeme Shaw

=== United States ===
Captain: Fred Ridley

- Buddy Alexander
- Billy Andrade
- Chris Kite
- Bob Lewis
- Bill Loeffler
- Len Mattiace
- Billy Mayfair
- Brian Montgomery
- Jay Sigel
- Jim Sorenson

== Wednesday's matches ==
=== Morning foursomes ===
&	Results
Montgomerie/Shaw	(United States) 5 & 4	Alexander/Mayfair
Curry/Paul	(United States) 2 & 1	Kite/Mattiace
Macgregor/Robinson	(United States) 2 & 1	Lewis/Loeffler
McHenry/Girvan	(United States) 3 & 2	Sigel/Andrade
0	Foursomes	4
0	Overall	4

=== Afternoon singles ===
&	Results
David Curry	(United Kingdom) (Republic of Ireland) 2 up	Buddy Alexander
Jeremy Robinson	(United States) 7 & 5	Billy Andrade
Colin Montgomerie	(United Kingdom) (Republic of Ireland) 3 & 2	Jim Sorenson
John McHenry	(United States) 1 up	Brian Montgomery
Bobby Eggo	(United States) 3 & 2	Jay Sigel
Paul Girvan	(United States) 3 & 2	Bob Lewis
David Carrick	(United States) 2 up	Billy Mayfair
Graeme Shaw	(United Kingdom) (Republic of Ireland) 1 up	Chris Kite
3	Singles	5
3	Overall	9

== Thursday's matches ==
=== Morning foursomes ===
&	Results
Curry/Carrick	(United States) 4 & 3	Lewis/Loeffler
Mongomerie/Shaw	(United States) 5 & 3	Kite/Mattiace
Mayo/Macgregor	(United States) 4 & 3	Sorenson/Montgomery
McHenry/Robinson	(United Kingdom) (Republic of Ireland) 4& 2	Sigel/Andrade
1	Foursomes	3
4	Overall	12

=== Afternoon singles ===
&	Results
David Curry	(United States) 5 & 4	Buddy Alexander
Colin Montgomerie	(United Kingdom) (Republic of Ireland) 4 & 2	Billy Andrade
John McHenry	(United Kingdom) (Republic of Ireland) 3 & 2	Bill Loeffler
Graeme Shaw	halved	Jim Sorenson
Jeremy Robinson	(United Kingdom) (Republic of Ireland) 1 up	Len Mattiace
David Carrick	(United States) 3 & 2	Bob Lewis
Bobby Eggo	(United States) 1 up	Billy Mayfair
Paul Girvan	(United States) 6 & 5	Jay Sigel
3½	Singles	4½
7½	Overall	16½
