= Nigel Edwards (golfer) =

Welsh amateur golfer

Nigel Edwards (born c. 1968) is a Welsh amateur golfer.

== Career ==
Edwards worked for the Golf Union of Wales for ten years. In early 2012, he became the Director of Coaching for the English Golf Union.

Edward was one of the leading Welsh amateurs for many years. He first played in the Walker Cup in 2001. In the 2003 Walker Cup, he made the winning putt at the Ganton Golf Club. He joined the team again in 2005 and 2007, and was captain of the winning team in 2011. He captained again in 2013.

On 16 January 2014 it was announced that Edwards had been re-appointed as captain of the Great Britain & Ireland for the 2015 Walker Cup at Royal Lytham and St Anne's, as well as the 2014 St Andrews Trophy.

== Team appearances ==
Amateur

- European Amateur Team Championship (representing Wales): 1997, 1999, 2001, 2003, 2005, 2008, 2009
- Walker Cup (representing Great Britain & Ireland): 2001 (winners), 2003 (winners), 2005, 2007, 2011 (winners, non-playing captain), 2013 (non-playing captain), 2015 (winners, non-playing captain)
- St Andrews Trophy (representing Great Britain & Ireland): 2002 (winners), 2004 (winners), 2006 (winners), 2010 (non-playing captain), 2012 (non-playing captain), 2014 (winners, non-playing captain)
- Bonallack Trophy (representing Europe): 2002, 2004, 2006 (winners), 2008 (winners)
- Eisenhower Trophy (representing Wales): 2002, 2004, 2006, 2008
