= 1991 Walker Cup =

Golf tournament

33rd Walker Cup Match
- Dates: 5–6 September 1991
- Venue: Portmarnock Golf Club
- Location: Portmarnock, County Dublin, Ireland
- Captains: George Macgregor (GB&I); Jim Gabrielsen (USA)
(United Kingdom) (Republic of Ireland)	10	14	(United States)
- United States wins the Walker Cup

The 1991 Walker Cup, the 33rd Walker Cup Match, was played on 5 and 6 September 1991, at Portmarnock Golf Club, Portmarnock, County Dublin, Ireland. The event was won by the United States 14 to 10.

== Format ==
The format for play on Thursday and Friday was the same. There were four matches of foursomes in the morning and eight singles matches in the afternoon. In all, 24 matches were played.

Each of the 24 matches was worth one point in the larger team competition. If a match was all square after the 18th hole extra holes were not played. Rather, each side earned ½ a point toward their team total. The team that accumulated at least 12½ points won the competition. If the two teams were tied, the previous winner would retain the trophy.

== Teams ==
Ten players for the United States and Great Britain & Ireland participated in the event plus one non-playing captain for each team.

=== Great Britain & Ireland ===
&
Captain: (Scotland) George Macgregor

- (Scotland) Andrew Coltart
- (England) Gary Evans
- (Republic of Ireland) Pádraig Harrington
- (Scotland) Garry Hay
- (Republic of Ireland) Garth McGimpsey
- (Republic of Ireland) Paul McGinley
- (Scotland) Jim Milligan
- (England) Jim Payne
- (England) Liam White
- (England) Ricky Willison

=== United States ===
Captain: Jim Gabrielsen

- Allen Doyle
- David Duval
- David Eger
- Franklin Langham
- Bob May
- Phil Mickelson
- Tom Scherrer
- Jay Sigel
- Mike Sposa
- Mitch Voges

== Thursday's matches ==
=== Morning foursomes ===
&	Results
Milligan/Hay	(United States) 5 & 3	Mickelson/May
Payne/Evans	(United States) 1 up	Duval/Sposa
McGimpsey/Willison	(United States) 1 up	Voges/Eger
McGinley/Harrington	(United States) 2 & 1	Sigel/Doyle
0	Foursomes	4
0	Overall	4

=== Afternoon singles ===
&	Results
Andrew Coltart	(United States) 4 & 3	Phil Mickelson
Jim Payne	(United Kingdom) (Republic of Ireland) 3 & 1	Franklin Langham
Gary Evans	(United Kingdom) (Republic of Ireland) 2 & 1	David Duval
Ricky Willison	(United States) 2 & 1	Bob May
Garth McGimpsey	(United Kingdom) (Republic of Ireland) 1 up	Mike Sposa
Paul McGinley	(United States) 6 & 4	Allen Doyle
Garry Hay	(United Kingdom) (Republic of Ireland) 1 up	Tom Scherrer
Liam White	(United States) 4 & 3	Jay Sigel
4	Singles	4
4	Overall	8

== Friday's matches ==
=== Morning foursomes ===
&	Results
Milligan/McGimpsey	(United Kingdom) (Republic of Ireland) 2 & 1	Voges/Eger
Payne/Willison	(United States) 1 up	Duval/Sposa
Evans/Coltart	(United Kingdom) (Republic of Ireland) 4 & 3	Langham/Scherrer
White/McGinley	(United Kingdom) (Republic of Ireland) 1 up	Mickelson/May
3	Foursomes	1
7	Overall	9

=== Afternoon singles ===
&	Results
Jim Milligan	(United States) 1 up	Phil Mickelson
Jim Payne	(United Kingdom) (Republic of Ireland) 2 & 1	Allen Doyle
Gary Evans	(United States) 4 & 2	Franklin Langham
Andrew Coltart	(United Kingdom) (Republic of Ireland) 1 up	Jay Sigel
Ricky Willison	(United Kingdom) (Republic of Ireland) 3 & 2	Tom Scherrer
Pádraig Harrington	(United States) 3 & 2	David Eger
Garth McGimpsey	(United States) 4 & 3	Bob May
Garry Hay	(United States) 3 & 1	Mitch Voges
3	Singles	5
10	Overall	14
