= 1973 Walker Cup =

Golf tournament

24th Walker Cup Match
- Dates: August 24–25, 1973
- Venue: The Country Club
- Location: Brookline, Massachusetts
- Captains: Jess Sweetser (USA); David Marsh (GB&I)
(United States)	14	10	(United Kingdom) (Republic of Ireland)
- United States wins the Walker Cup

The 1973 Walker Cup, the 24th Walker Cup Match, was played on August 24 and 25, 1973, at The Country Club, Brookline, Massachusetts. The event was won by the United States 14 to 10.

Great Britain and Ireland failed to win any foursomes matches, losing six and halving the other two. In first singles session Great Britain and Ireland won five matches but needing 6½ points from the final 8 singles they could only win three, halve two while two of the lost matches went to the last hole.

== Format ==
The format for play on Friday and Saturday was the same. There were four matches of foursomes in the morning and eight singles matches in the afternoon. In all, 24 matches were played.

Each of the 24 matches was worth one point in the larger team competition. If a match was all square after the 18th hole extra holes were not played. Rather, each side earned ½ a point toward their team total. The team that accumulated at least 12½ points won the competition. If the two teams were tied, the previous winner would retain the trophy.

== Teams ==
Ten players for the United States and Great Britain & Ireland participated in the event plus one non-playing captain for each team.

=== United States ===
Captain: Jess Sweetser

- Doug Ballenger
- Danny Edwards
- Jimmy Ellis
- Vinny Giles
- Mike Killian
- Gary Koch
- Mark Pfeil
- Bill Rogers
- Dick Siderowf
- Marty West

=== Great Britain & Ireland ===
&
Captain: (England) David Marsh

- (England) Michael Bonallack
- (England) Howard Clark
- (England) John Davies
- (England) Rodney Foster
- (Scotland) Charlie Green
- (England) Peter Hedges
- (England) Trevor Homer
- (England) Michael King
- (Scotland) Willie Milne
- (Scotland) Hugh Stuart

== Friday's matches ==
=== Morning foursomes ===
&	Results
King/Hedges	halved	Giles/Koch
Stuart/Davies	(United States) 5 & 4	Siderowf/Pfeil
Green/Milne	(United States) 2 & 1	Edwards/Ellis
Foster/Homer	(United States) 2 & 1	West/Ballenger
½	Foursomes	3½
½	Overall	3½

=== Afternoon singles ===
&	Results
Hugh Stuart	(United States) 5 & 4	Vinny Giles
Michael Bonallack	(United States) 4 & 2	Dick Siderowf
John Davies	(United Kingdom) (Republic of Ireland) 1 up	Gary Koch
Howard Clark	(United Kingdom) (Republic of Ireland) 2 & 1	Marty West
Rodney Foster	(United States) 2 up	Danny Edwards
Michael King	(United Kingdom) (Republic of Ireland) 1 up	Mike Killian
Charlie Green	(United Kingdom) (Republic of Ireland) 1 up	Bill Rogers
Willie Milne	(United Kingdom) (Republic of Ireland) 4 & 3	Mark Pfeil
5	Singles	3
5½	Overall	6½

== Saturday's matches ==
=== Morning foursomes ===
&	Results
Homer/Foster	(United States) 7 & 5	Giles/Koch
Clark/Davies	halved	Siderowf/Pfeil
Hedges/King	(United States) 2 & 1	Edwards/Ellis
Stuart/Milne	(United States) 1 up	Rogers/Killian
½	Foursomes	3½
6	Overall	10

=== Afternoon singles ===
&	Results
Charlie Green	halved	Vinny Giles
John Davies	(United Kingdom) (Republic of Ireland) 3 & 2	Dick Siderowf
Trevor Homer	(United States) 2 & 1	Danny Edwards
Hugh Stuart	(United Kingdom) (Republic of Ireland) 5 & 4	Jimmy Ellis
Michael King	(United States) 2 up	Marty West
Howard Clark	(United States) 1 up	Mark Pfeil
Willie Milne	(United Kingdom) (Republic of Ireland) 2 & 1	Mike Killian
Peter Hedges	halved	Gary Koch
4	Singles	4
10	Overall	14
