= Garth McGimpsey =

Northern Irish amateur golfer (born 1955)

Garth McGimpsey MBE
Personal information
- Full name: Garth McGimpsey
- Nationality: Northern Ireland
- Born: 17 July 1955 (age 71) Bangor, County Down, Northern Ireland

Career
- Sport: Golf
- Status: Amateur

Best results in major championships
- Masters Tournament: CUT: 1986, 1987
- PGA Championship: DNP
- U.S. Open: DNP
- The Open Championship: CUT: 1985, 1986

Garth McGimpsey (born 17 July 1955) is an amateur golfer from Bangor, Northern Ireland.

== Early life ==
McGimpsey attended Millfield School from 1972 to 1974.

== Playing career ==
McGimpsey won The Amateur Championship in 1985. He beat Graham Homewood, England, 8 and 7 in the final at Royal Dornoch Golf Club, Sutherland, Scotland.

His win gave an invitation to the Masters in 1986 and 1987 but he failed to make the cut on either occasion. He also played in The Open Championship in 1985 and 1986 but failed to make the cut.

He was part of the winning Great Britain and Ireland team at the 1988 Eisenhower Trophy and the winning Ireland teams at the 1983 and 1987 European Amateur Team Championship. He represented the combined Northern Ireland and Republic of Ireland team at ten consecutive European Amateur Team Championships.

McGimpsey was the Irish long driving champion in 1977 and the United Kingdom long driving champion in 1979.

== Captaincy career ==
He was appointed captain for the 2003 and 2005 Great Britain and Ireland Walker Cup teams.

== Personal life, honors ==
McGimpsey was made a Member of the Order of the British Empire in the 2004 New Year Honours.

In 2004, McGimpsey was charged after having cocaine delivered to his home but was cleared of having any links to the drugs.

== Amateur wins ==
- 1985 The Amateur Championship, Irish Amateur
- 1988 Irish Amateur

== Senior amateur wins ==
- 2010 Ulster Seniors
- 2011 Irish Senior Close, Ulster Seniors
- 2012 Irish Senior Close, Ulster Seniors
- 2013 Irish Senior Close, Connacht Seniors
- 2014 Ulster Seniors
- 2015 Ulster Seniors
- 2016 Ulster Seniors, Connacht Seniors, Munster Seniors
- 2017 Ulster Seniors
- 2019 Munster Seniors

== Team appearances ==
Amateur

- European Amateur Team Championship (representing Ireland): 1981, 1983 (winners), 1985, 1987 (winners), 1989, 1991, 1993, 1995, 1997, 1999
- Walker Cup (representing Great Britain and Ireland): 1985, 1989 (winners), 1991, 2003 (non-playing captain), 2005 (non-playing captain)
- Eisenhower Trophy (representing Great Britain and Ireland): 1984, 1986, 1988 (winners)
- St Andrews Trophy (representing Great Britain and Ireland): 1984 (winners), 1986 (winners), 1988 (winners), 1990 (winners), 1992 (winners), 2002 (non-playing captain), 2004 (non-playing captain)
