= 2001 Walker Cup =

Golf tournament

38th Walker Cup Match
- Dates: August 11–12, 2001
- Venue: Ocean Forest Golf Club
- Location: Sea Island, Georgia
- Captains: Danny Yates (USA); Peter McEvoy (GB&I)
(United States)	9	15	(United Kingdom) (Republic of Ireland)
- Great Britain & Ireland wins the Walker Cup

The 2001 Walker Cup, the 38th Walker Cup Match, was played on August 11 and 12, 2001, at Ocean Forest Golf Club in Sea Island, Georgia. The event was won by Great Britain and Ireland 15 to 9, marking the first time that Great Britain & Ireland retained the Cup (i.e., had two consecutive wins).

== Format ==
The format for play on Saturday and Sunday was the same. There were four matches of foursomes in the morning and eight singles matches in the afternoon. In all, 24 matches were played.

Each of the 24 matches is worth one point in the larger team competition. If a match is all square after the 18th hole extra holes are not played. Rather, each side earns ½ a point toward their team total. The team that accumulates at least 12½ points wins the competition. If the two teams are tied, the previous winner retains the trophy.

== Teams ==
Ten players for the USA and Great Britain & Ireland participate in the event plus one non-playing captain for each team.

& Team Great Britain & Ireland
Name	Age	Hometown	Notes
(England) Peter McEvoy	48	Copt Heath, Solihull, England	non-playing captain
(England) Luke Donald	23	High Wycombe, England
(England) Nick Dougherty	19	Chorley, England
(Wales) Nigel Edwards	33	Caerphilly, Wales
(England) Jamie Elson	20	Leamington Spa, England
(Northern Ireland) Michael Hoey	22	Belfast, Northern Ireland
(Northern Ireland) Graeme McDowell	22	Portrush, Northern Ireland
(England) Richard McEvoy	22	Shoeburyness, England	No relation to captain Peter McEvoy
(Scotland) Steven O'Hara	21	Motherwell, Scotland
(Scotland) Marc Warren	21	East Kilbride, Scotland
(England) Gary Wolstenholme	40	Market Harborough, England

Team USA
Name	Age	Hometown	Notes
Danny Yates	49	Atlanta, Georgia	non-playing captain
Nick Cassini	22	Athens, Georgia
Erik Compton	21	Miami, Florida
James Driscoll	23	Brookline, Massachusetts
David Eger	49	Ponte Vedra Beach, Florida
Lucas Glover	21	Greenville, South Carolina
Danny Green	44	Jackson, Tennessee
John Harris	49	Minneapolis, Minnesota
Bryce Molder	22	Conway, Arkansas
Jeff Quinney	22	Eugene, Oregon
D. J. Trahan	20	Inman, South Carolina

== Saturday's matches ==
=== Morning foursomes ===
&	Results
O'Hara/Wolstenholme	(United Kingdom) (Republic of Ireland) 5 and 3	Green/Trahan
Donald/Dougherty	(United States) 4 and 3	Cassini/Glover
Elson/McEvoy	halved	Eger/Molder
McDowell/Hoey	(United Kingdom) (Republic of Ireland) 3 and 1	Driscoll/Quinney
2½	Foursomes	1½
2½	Overall	1½

=== Afternoon singles ===
&	Results
Gary Wolstenholme	(United States) 3 and 2	Erik Compton
Steven O'Hara	(United States) 2 and 1	D.J. Trahan
Nick Dougherty	(United Kingdom) (Republic of Ireland) 2 and 1	James Driscoll
Nigel Edwards	(United States) 5 and 4	Nick Cassini
Marc Warren	(United Kingdom) (Republic of Ireland) 5 and 4	John Harris
Luke Donald	(United Kingdom) (Republic of Ireland) 4 and 2	Jeff Quinney
Graeme McDowell	(United States) 2 and 1	Bryce Molder
Michael Hoey	(United States) 1 up	Lucas Glover
3	Singles	5
5½	Overall	6½

== Sunday's matches ==
=== Morning foursomes ===
&	Results
Donald/Dougherty	(United Kingdom) (Republic of Ireland) 3 and 2	Compton/Harris
McDowell/Hoey	(United Kingdom) (Republic of Ireland) 2 and 1	Cassini/Glover
O'Hara/Warren	(United States) 7 and 6	Eger/Molder
Elson/McEvoy	(United Kingdom) (Republic of Ireland) 1 up	Green/Trahan
3	Foursomes	1
8½	Overall	7½

=== Afternoon singles ===
&	Results
Luke Donald	(United Kingdom) (Republic of Ireland) 3 and 2	Lucas Glover
Nick Dougherty	(United Kingdom) (Republic of Ireland) 1 up	D.J. Trahan
Graeme McDowell	(United States) 1 up	Bryce Molder
Steven O'Hara	(United Kingdom) (Republic of Ireland) 4 and 3	John Harris
Marc Warren	(United Kingdom) (Republic of Ireland) 2 and 1	James Driscoll
Michael Hoey	(United Kingdom) (Republic of Ireland) 1 up	Danny Green
Jamie Elson	halved	Erik Compton
Gary Wolstenholme	(United Kingdom) (Republic of Ireland) 4 and 3	Nick Cassini
6½	Singles	1½
15	Overall	9
