= 2007 Walker Cup =

Golf tournament

Coordinates: 54.218°N 5.884°W

41st Walker Cup Match
- Dates: 8–9 September 2007
- Venue: Royal County Down Golf Club
- Location: Newcastle, County Down, Northern Ireland
- Captains: Colin Dalgleish (GB&I); Buddy Marucci (USA)
(United Kingdom) (Republic of Ireland)	11½	12½	(United States)
- United States wins the Walker Cup

The 41st Walker Cup Match was played on 8 and 9 September 2007 at the Royal County Down Golf Club in Newcastle, County Down, Northern Ireland. Team United States won 12½ to 11½. The United States won by the same score in 2005.

== Format ==
The format for play on Saturday and Sunday are the same. There are four matches of foursomes in the morning and eight singles matches in the afternoon. In all, 24 matches are played.

Each of the 24 matches is worth one point in the larger team competition. If a match is all square after the 18th hole extra holes are not played – each side earns ½ a point toward their team total. The team that accumulates at least 12½ points wins the competition.

== Teams ==
Ten players for the USA and Great Britain & Ireland participate in the event plus one non-playing captain for each team.

Team USA
Name	Age	Hometown	Notes
Buddy Marucci	55	Villanova, Pennsylvania	non-playing captain
Rickie Fowler	18	Murrieta, California	Won 2007 Players Amateur, 2007 Sunnehanna Amateur
Billy Horschel	20	Grant, Florida	Played in 2006 U.S. Open
Dustin Johnson	23	Myrtle Beach, South Carolina	Won 2007 Monroe Invitational, 2007 Northeast Amateur
Chris Kirk	22	Woodstock, Georgia	2007 Ben Hogan Award winner
Colt Knost	22	Dallas, Texas	Won 2007 U.S. Amateur Public Links and U.S. Amateur
Trip Kuehne	35	Irving, Texas	Has played in four US Opens
Jamie Lovemark	19	Rancho Santa Fe, California	Won 2007 NCAA Division I Championship as a freshman
Jonathan Moore	22	Vancouver, Washington	Won 2006 NCAA Division I Championship as a freshman
Webb Simpson	22	Raleigh, North Carolina	Semi-finalist at the 2006 U.S. Amateur
Kyle Stanley	19	Gig Harbor, Washington	Division I first team All-American as a freshman

& Team Great Britain & Ireland
Name	Age	Hometown	Notes
(Scotland) Colin Dalgleish	46	Helensburgh, Scotland	non-playing captain
(Northern Ireland) Jonathan Caldwell	23	Newtownards, Northern Ireland	Semi-finalist in the Irish Amateur Close Championship
(Wales) Rhys Davies	22	Glamorgan, Wales	2003 British Boys' Championship winner
(Wales) Nigel Edwards	39	Caerphilly, Wales	4th appearance
(England) David Horsey	22	Wilmslow, England	Runner-up in the 2004 English Amateur
(Northern Ireland) Rory McIlroy	18	Holywood, Northern Ireland	T42nd at the 2007 Open Championship (silver medal for Best Amateur), won 2006 European Amateur, 1 week as World Amateur Golf Ranking number 1
(Wales) Llewellyn Matthews	23	Bridgend, Wales	Wire-to-wire winner of the St Andrews Links Trophy
(England) Jamie Moul	22	Colchester, England	#1 on the World Amateur Golf Ranking for 17 weeks
(England) John Parry	20	Knaresborough, England	2007 Spanish Amateur Championship
(Scotland) Lloyd Saltman	21	Gorebridge, Scotland	In 2007, won the Scottish Champion of Champions, the Craigmillar Park Open, the Lytham Trophy and the Irish Open Stroke Play Championship in a 5-week span. T15th at the 2005 Open Championship (silver medal for Best Amateur)
(England) Danny Willett	19	Sheffield, England	2007 English Amateur winner

== Saturday's matches ==
=== Morning foursomes ===
&	Results
Saltman/Davies	(United States) 4 and 3	Horschel/Fowler
McIlroy/Caldwell	halved	Knost/Johnson
Parry/Horsey	(United Kingdom) (Republic of Ireland) 2 and 1	Kuehne/Stanley
Moul/Willett	halved	Simpson/Moore
2	Foursomes	2
2	Overall	2

=== Afternoon singles ===
&	Results
Rory McIlroy	(United States) 1 up	Billy Horschel
Lloyd Saltman	(United States) 5 and 4	Rickie Fowler
Rhys Davies	(United Kingdom) (Republic of Ireland) 5 and 4	Dustin Johnson
Danny Willett	(United States) 2 up	Colt Knost
Llewellyn Matthews	(United States) 5 and 4	Jamie Lovemark
Nigel Edwards	(United Kingdom) (Republic of Ireland) 1 up	Kyle Stanley
Jamie Moul	(United Kingdom) (Republic of Ireland) 1 up	Chris Kirk
David Horsey	(United Kingdom) (Republic of Ireland) 1 up	Webb Simpson
4	Singles	4
6	Overall	6

== Sunday's matches ==
=== Morning foursomes ===
&	Results
Caldwell/McIlroy	(United States) 2 and 1	Horschel/Fowler
Davies/Edwards	(United States) 1 up	Knost/Johnson
Moul/Willett	(United States) 4 and 2	Kuehne/Moore
Parry/Horsey	(United States) 1 up	Kirk/Lovemark
0	Foursomes	4
6	Overall	10

=== Afternoon singles ===
&	Results
Rory McIlroy	(United Kingdom) (Republic of Ireland) 4 and 2	Billy Horschel
Rhys Davies	(United Kingdom) (Republic of Ireland) 3 and 2	Rickie Fowler
Danny Willett	halved	Colt Knost
Lloyd Saltman	(United Kingdom) (Republic of Ireland) 2 and 1	Trip Kuehne
Jonny Caldwell	(United Kingdom) (Republic of Ireland) 2 up	Kyle Stanley
Nigel Edwards	(United States) 1 up	Jonathan Moore
Jamie Moul	(United States) 4 and 3	Jamie Lovemark
David Horsey	(United Kingdom) (Republic of Ireland) 1 up	Webb Simpson
5½	Singles	2½
11½	Overall	12½

== The course ==
The Royal County Down Golf Club in Newcastle, County Down, Northern Ireland is a par 71 course with a yardage of 7,181. Old Tom Morris is credited with designing it in 1889. In 1908, King Edward VII conferred "Royal" status to the club.
