= 2013 Walker Cup =

Golf tournament

Coordinates: 40.909444°N 72.450833°W

44th Walker Cup Match
- Dates: September 7–8, 2013
- Venue: National Golf Links of America
- Location: Southampton, New York
- Captains: Jim Holtgrieve (USA); Nigel Edwards (GB&I)
(United States)	17	9	(United Kingdom) (Republic of Ireland)
- United States wins the Walker Cup

The 44th Walker Cup Match was played on September 7 and 8, 2013 at the National Golf Links of America in Southampton, New York. The United States won 17 to 9.

== Format ==
On Saturday, there are four matches of foursomes in the morning and eight singles matches in the afternoon. On Sunday, there are again four matches of foursomes in the morning, followed by ten singles matches (involving every player) in the afternoon. In all, 26 matches are played.

Each of the 26 matches is worth one point in the larger team competition. If a match is all square after the 18th hole extra holes are not played. Rather, each side earns ½ a point toward their team total. The team that accumulates at least 13½ points wins the competition. In the event of a tie, the previous winner retains the Cup.

== Teams ==
Ten players for the USA and Great Britain & Ireland participates in the event plus one non-playing captain for each team.

Team USA
Name	Rank	Age	Hometown	Notes
Jim Holtgrieve		65	Ft. Myers, Florida	non-playing captain
Max Homa	13	22	Valencia, California	won 2013 NCAA Individual Championship
Michael Kim	2	20	Del Mar, California	won 2013 Haskins Award
Jordan Niebrugge	24	20	Mequon, Wisconsin	won 2013 U.S. Amateur Public Links, Western Amateur
Patrick Rodgers	5	21	Avon, Indiana	played 2011 Walker Cup
Nathan Smith	148	35	Pittsburgh, Pennsylvania	played 2009, 2011 Walker Cups, won 2012 U.S. Mid-Amateur
Justin Thomas	12	20	Goshen, Kentucky	played 2012 Eisenhower Trophy
Michael Weaver	22	22	Fresno, California	runner-up in 2012 U.S. Amateur
Todd White	102	45	Spartanburg, South Carolina	won 2010 Palmetto Amateur, 2004 South Carolina Mid-Amateur
Cory Whitsett	3	21	Houston, Texas	won 2013 Northeast Amateur, 2007 U.S. Junior Amateur
Bobby Wyatt	27	21	Mobile, Alabama	won 2012 Sunnehanna Amateur

& Team Great Britain & Ireland
Name	Rank	Age	Hometown	Notes
(Wales) Nigel Edwards		45	Whitchurch, Cardiff, Wales	non-playing captain
(England) Matt Fitzpatrick	1	18	Hallamshire, Yorkshire	won 2013 U.S. Amateur, 2012 Boys Amateur, Low Amateur at 2013 Open Championship
(England) Nathan Kimsey	19	20	Woodhall Spa, Lincolnshire	won 2013 Terra Cotta Invitational
(Republic of Ireland) Gavin Moynihan	133	18	The Island, Dublin	won 2012 Irish Amateur Open Championship
(England) Max Orrin	7	19	North Foreland, Kent	won 2013 South East of England Links Championship
(Republic of Ireland) Kevin Phelan	52	22	Waterford Castle, County Waterford	played on 2013 Palmer Cup, 2012 & 2012 Eisenhower Trophy teams
(England) Garrick Porteous	18	23	Bamburgh Castle, Northumberland	won 2013 Amateur Championship
(Wales) Rhys Pugh	346	19	Pontypridd, Mid Glamorgan	played 2011 Walker Cup, won 2012 European Amateur
(England) Neil Raymond	23	27	Corhampton, Hampshire	won 2013 St Andrews Links Trophy, 2011 & 2012 Brabazon Trophy
(England) Callum Shinkwin	11	20	Moor Park, Hertfordshire	won 2013 English Amateur
(England) Jordan Smith	15	20	Bowood, Wiltshire	won 2013 Brabazon Trophy

Note: "Rank" is the World Amateur Golf Ranking as of 4 September 2013.

== Saturday's matches ==
=== Morning foursomes ===
&	Results
Kimsey/Orrin	halved	Whitsett/Wyatt
Fitzpatrick/Raymond	(United Kingdom) (Republic of Ireland) 1 up	Niebrugge/Smith
Porteous/Pugh	(United Kingdom) (Republic of Ireland) 3 & 1	Weaver/White
Moynihan/Phelan	(United States) 2 & 1	Rodgers/Thomas
2½	Foursomes	1½
2½	Overall	1½

=== Afternoon singles ===
&	Results
Neil Raymond	(United States) 2 up	Bobby Wyatt
Max Orrin	(United States) 5 & 3	Max Homa
Callum Shinkwin	(United States) 2 & 1	Michael Kim
Jordan Smith	(United States) 1 up	Cory Whitsett
Garrick Porteous	(United States) 1 up	Jordan Niebrugge
Matt Fitzpatrick	(United States) 3 & 1	Michael Weaver
Nathan Kimsey	halved	Justin Thomas
Gavin Moynihan	(United Kingdom) (Republic of Ireland) 2 & 1	Patrick Rodgers
1½	Singles	6½
4	Overall	8

== Sunday's matches ==
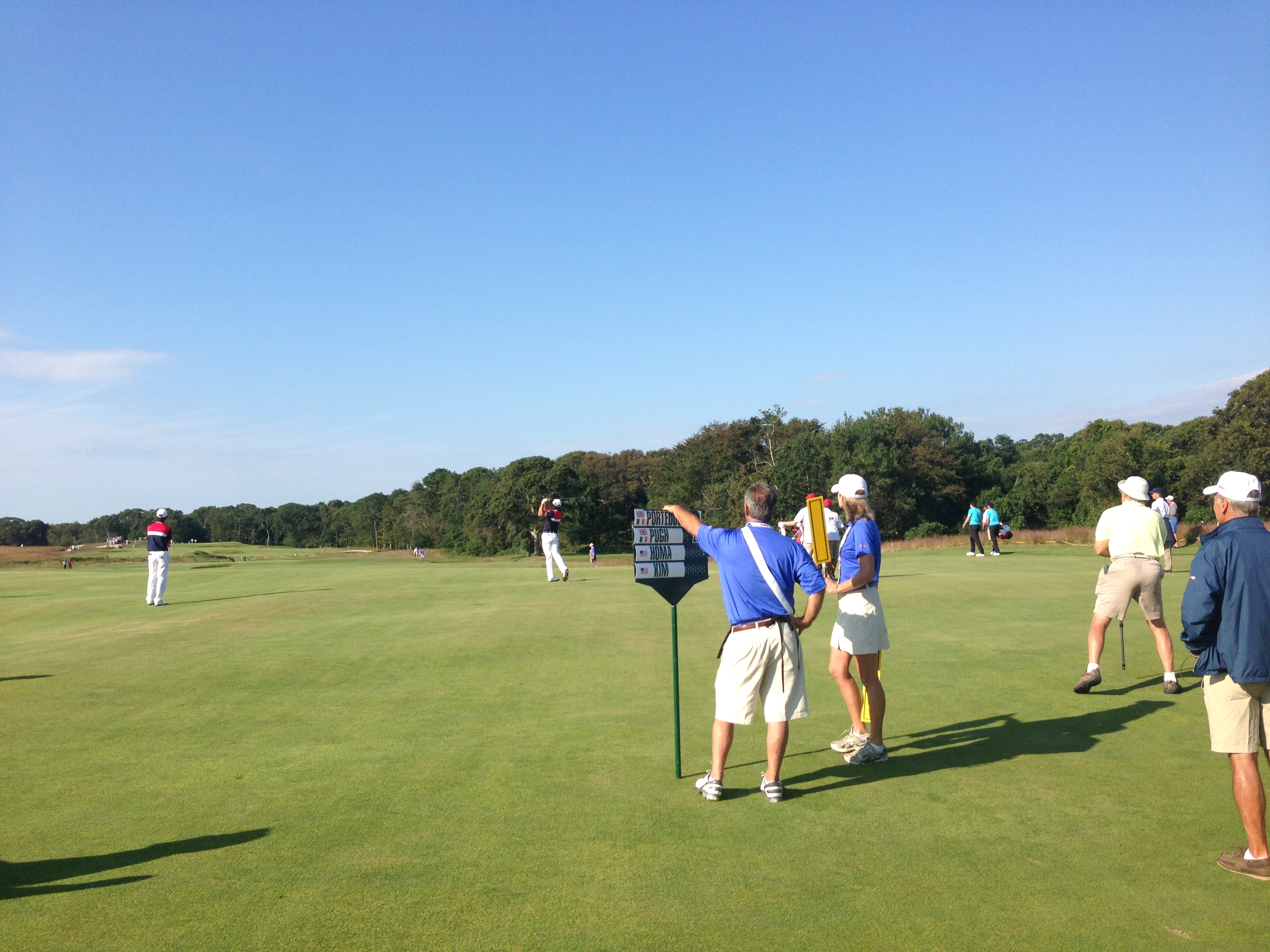
Max Homa approach shot in Sunday morning foursomes

=== Morning foursomes ===
&	Results
Kimsey/Orrin	(United States) 2 & 1	Wyatt/Whitsett
Fitzpatrick/Raymond	(United Kingdom) (Republic of Ireland) 3 & 2	Weaver/White
Porteous/Pugh	(United States) 1 up	Homa/Kim
Moynihan/Phelan	(United Kingdom) (Republic of Ireland) 2 up	Rodgers/Niebrugge
2	Foursomes	2
6	Overall	10

=== Afternoon singles ===
&	Results
Neil Raymond	(United States) 4 & 3	Bobby Wyatt
Max Orrin	(United States) 6 & 4	Justin Thomas
Matt Fitzpatrick	(United Kingdom) (Republic of Ireland) 3 & 2	Michael Weaver
Rhys Pugh	(United States) 4 & 3	Todd White
Nathan Kimsey	(United States) 4 & 3	Nathan Smith
Callum Shinkwin	(United Kingdom) (Republic of Ireland) 2 up	Cory Whitsett
Garrick Porteous	(United States) 4 & 2	Michael Kim
Kevin Phelan	(United Kingdom) (Republic of Ireland) 2 & 1	Max Homa
Jordan Smith	(United States) 6 & 5	Jordan Niebrugge
Gavin Moynihan	(United States) 1 up	Patrick Rodgers
3	Singles	7
9	Overall	17
