= 2003 Walker Cup =

Golf tournament

Coordinates: 54.1882°N 0.4962°W

39th Walker Cup Match
- Dates: 6–7 September 2003
- Venue: Ganton Golf Club
- Location: North Yorkshire, England
- Captains: Garth McGimpsey (GB&I); Bob Lewis (USA)
(United Kingdom) (Republic of Ireland)	12½	11½	(United States)
- Great Britain & Ireland wins the Walker Cup

The 2003 Walker Cup, the 39th Walker Cup Match, was played on 6 and 7 September 2003, at Ganton Golf Club in North Yorkshire, England. The event was won by Great Britain and Ireland 12½ to 11½, marking the first time that Great Britain & Ireland had three consecutive wins.

== Format ==
The format for play on Saturday and Sunday was the same. There were four matches of foursomes in the morning and eight singles matches in the afternoon. In all, 24 matches were played.

Each of the 24 matches is worth one point in the larger team competition. If a match is all square after the 18th hole extra holes are not played. Rather, each side earns ½ a point toward their team total. The team that accumulates at least 12½ points wins the competition.

== Teams ==
Ten players for the USA and Great Britain & Ireland participate in the event plus one non-playing captain for each team.

Team USA
Name	Age	Hometown	Notes
Bob Lewis	59	Pepper Pike, Ohio	non-playing captain
Bill Haas	21	Greer, South Carolina	Son of Jay Haas; 2002 U.S. Amateur semifinalist
Matt Hendrix	22	Aiken, South Carolina	Won 2003 Sunnehanna Amateur
Trip Kuehne	31	Irving, Texas	Low amateur at 2003 U.S. Open
Brock Mackenzie	22	Yakima, Washington	Won 2002 Pacific Coast Amateur
Ryan Moore	20	Puyallup, Washington	Won 2002 U.S. Amateur Public Links
Chris Nallen	21	Hackettstown, New Jersey	Won 2003 Northeast Amateur
Adam Rubinson	23	Fort Worth, Texas	Runner up at 2002 Western Amateur and NCAA Championship
Casey Wittenberg	18	Memphis, Tennessee	Won 2003 Porter Cup, Southern Amateur
Lee Williams	21	Alexander City, Alabama	Won 2002 Southern Amateur; runner-up at 2003 NCAAs
George Zahringer	50	New York City	Won 2002 U.S. Mid-Amateur

& Team Great Britain & Ireland
Name	Age	Hometown	Notes
(Northern Ireland) Garth McGimpsey	48	Bangor, Northern Ireland	non-playing captain
(Wales) Nigel Edwards	34	Caerphilly, Wales	Fourth in the 2003 Lytham Trophy and Brabazon Trophy
(Republic of Ireland) Noel Fox	29	Dublin, Ireland	Won 2003 Irish Amateur
(Scotland) Graham Gordon	23	Aberdeen, Scotland	Won 2003 Scottish Amateur and seven 2002 events
(Scotland) David Inglis	21	Roslin, Midlothian, Scotland	Won five 2003 U.S. collegiate events
(Wales) Stuart Manley	24	Mountain Ash, Wales
(Republic of Ireland) Colm Moriarty	24	Athlone, Ireland	Won 2003 New South Wales Amateur, third in Lytham Trophy
(England) Michael Skelton	19	Redcar, England	Won 2003 Welsh Open Amateur, runner-up in 2003 English Amateur
(England) Oliver Wilson	22	Mansfield, England	Won three 2003 U.S. college events
(Scotland) Stuart Wilson	26	Forfar, Scotland	Won the 2003 Lytham Trophy
(England) Gary Wolstenholme	42	Market Harborough, England	Won two Amateur Championships

== Saturday's matches ==
=== Morning foursomes ===
&	Results
Wolstenholme/Skelton	(United States) 2 and 1	Haas/Kuehne
S. Wilson/Inglis	(United Kingdom) (Republic of Ireland) 2 up	Williams/Zahringer
Edwards/Manley	(United Kingdom) (Republic of Ireland) 3 and 2	Nallen/Moore
Fox/Moriarty	(United Kingdom) (Republic of Ireland) 4 and 2	Rubinson/Wittenberg
3	Foursomes	1
3	Overall	1

=== Afternoon singles ===
&	Results
Gary Wolstenholme	(United States) 1 up	Bill Haas
Oliver Wilson	halved	Trip Kuehne
David Inglis	(United States) 3 and 2	Brock Mackenzie
Stuart Wilson	halved	Matt Hendrix
Nigel Edwards	(United Kingdom) (Republic of Ireland) 3 and 2	George Zahringer
Colm Moriarty	(United States) 2 up	Chris Nallen
Noel Fox	(United States) 3 and 2	Adam Rubinson
Graham Gordon	(United States) 5 and 4	Casey Wittenberg
2	Singles	6
5	Overall	7

== Sunday's matches ==
=== Morning foursomes ===
&	Results
Wolstenholme/O. Wilson	(United Kingdom) (Republic of Ireland) 5 and 4	Haas/Kuehne
Fox/Moriarty	(United States) 6 and 5	Mackenzie/Hendrix
S. Wilson/Inglis	halved	Wittenberg/Rubinson
Edwards/Manley	halved	Williams/Zahringer
2	Foursomes	2
7	Overall	9

=== Afternoon singles ===
&	Results
Oliver Wilson	(United Kingdom) (Republic of Ireland) 1 up	Bill Haas
Gary Wolstenholme	(United Kingdom) (Republic of Ireland) 3 and 2	Casey Wittenberg
Michael Skelton	(United Kingdom) (Republic of Ireland) 3 and 2	Adam Rubinson
Colm Moriarty	(United States) 3 and 1	Brock Mackenzie
Stuart Wilson	(United States) 5 and 4	Matt Hendrix
David Inglis	(United Kingdom) (Republic of Ireland) 4 and 3	Ryan Moore
Nigel Edwards	halved	Lee Williams
Stuart Manley	(United Kingdom) (Republic of Ireland) 3 and 1	Trip Kuehne
5½	Singles	2½
12½	Overall	11½
