= 1999 Walker Cup =

Golf tournament

Coordinates: 57.587°N 3.895°W

37th Walker Cup Match
- Dates: 11–12 September 1999
- Venue: Nairn Golf Club
- Location: Nairn, Scotland
- Captains: Peter McEvoy (GB&I); Danny Yates (USA)
(United Kingdom) (Republic of Ireland)	15	9	(United States)
- Great Britain & Ireland wins the Walker Cup

The 1999 Walker Cup, the 37th Walker Cup Match, was played on 11–12 September 1999, at Nairn Golf Club in Nairn, Scotland. The event was won by Great Britain and Ireland 15 to 9.

== Format ==
The format for play on Saturday and Sunday was the same. There were four matches of foursomes in the morning and eight singles matches in the afternoon. In all, 24 matches were played.

Each of the 24 matches is worth one point in the larger team competition. If a match is all square after the 18th hole extra holes are not played. Rather, each side earns ½ a point toward their team total. The team that accumulates at least 12½ points wins the competition. If the two teams are tied, the previous winner retains the trophy.

== Teams ==
Ten players for the US and Great Britain & Ireland participate in the event plus one non-playing captain for each team.

Team USA
Name	Age	Hometown	Notes
Danny Yates	49	Atlanta, Georgia	non-playing captain
Jonathan Byrd	21	Columbia, South Carolina
David Gossett	20	Germantown, Tennessee
Hunter Haas	22	Norman, Oklahoma
Tim Jackson	40	Germantown, Tennessee	Played in the 1995 Walker Cup
Edward Loar	21	Rockwall, Texas
Matt Kuchar	22	Lake Mary, Florida
Tom McKnight	45	Galax, Virginia
Spider Miller	49	Bloomington, Indiana
Bryce Molder	20	Conway, Arkansas
Steve Scott	22	Coral Springs, Florida	Played in the 1997 Walker Cup

& Team Great Britain & Ireland
Name	Age	Hometown	Notes
(England) Peter McEvoy	46	Copt Heath, Solihull, England	non-playing captain
(England) Paul Casey	22	Weybridge, England
(England) Luke Donald	21	High Wycombe, England
(England) Simon Dyson	21	Sand Moor, England
(Northern Ireland) Paddy Gribben	30	Warrenpoint, Northern Ireland
(Scotland) Lorne Kelly	25	Cowal, Scotland
(Scotland) David Pattrick	24	Mortonhall, Scotland
(Scotland) Graham Rankin	33	Drumpellier, Scotland	Played in the 1995 and 1997 Walker Cups
(England) Phil Rowe	20	West Cornwall, England
(England) Graeme Storm	21	Wynyard, England
(England) Gary Wolstenholme	38	Kilworth Springs, England	Played in the 1995 and 1997 Walker Cups

== Saturday's matches ==
=== Morning foursomes ===
&	Results
Rankin/Storm	(United States) 1 up	Haas/Miller
Casey/Donald	(United Kingdom) (Republic of Ireland) 5 and 3	Byrd/Scott
Gribben/Kelly	(United States) 3 and 1	Gossett/Jackson
Rowe/Wolstenholme	(United Kingdom) (Republic of Ireland) 1 up	Kuchar/Molder
2	Foursomes	2
2	Overall	2

=== Afternoon singles ===
&	Results
Graham Rankin	(United States) 4 and 3	Edward Loar
Luke Donald	(United Kingdom) (Republic of Ireland) 4 and 3	Tom McKnight
Graeme Storm	(United States) 4 and 3	Hunter Haas
Paul Casey	(United Kingdom) (Republic of Ireland) 4 and 3	Steve Scott
David Patrick	(United States) 6 and 5	Jonathan Byrd
Simon Dyson	halved	David Gossett
Paddy Gribben	halved	Bryce Molder
Lorne Kelly	(United States) 3 and 1	Tim Jackson
3	Singles	5
5	Overall	7

== Sunday's matches ==
=== Morning foursomes ===
&	Results
Storm/Rankin	(United Kingdom) (Republic of Ireland) 4 and 3	Loar/McKnight
Dyson/Gribben	(United States) 1 up	Haas/Miller
Casey/Donald	(United Kingdom) (Republic of Ireland) 1 up	Gossett/Jackson
Rowe/Wolstenholme	(United Kingdom) (Republic of Ireland) 4 and 3	Kuchar/Molder
3	Foursomes	1
8	Overall	8

=== Afternoon singles ===
&	Results
Graham Rankin	(United Kingdom) (Republic of Ireland) 1 up	Steve Scott
Simon Dyson	(United States) 5 and 4	Edward Loar
Paul Casey	(United Kingdom) (Republic of Ireland) 3 and 2	John "Spider" Miller
Graeme Storm	(United Kingdom) (Republic of Ireland) 1 up	Jonathan Byrd
Luke Donald	(United Kingdom) (Republic of Ireland) 3 and 2	Bryce Molder
Phil Rowe	(United Kingdom) (Republic of Ireland) 1 up	Matt Kuchar
Paddy Gribben	(United Kingdom) (Republic of Ireland) 3 and 2	Hunter Haas
Gary Wolstenholme	(United Kingdom) (Republic of Ireland) 1 up	David Gossett
7	Singles	1
15	Overall	9
