= 1971 Walker Cup =

Golf tournament

23rd Walker Cup Match
- Dates: 26–27 May 1971
- Venue: Old Course at St Andrews
- Location: St Andrews, Scotland
- Captains: Michael Bonallack (GB&I); John M. Winters (USA)
(United Kingdom) (Republic of Ireland)	13	11	(United States)
- Great Britain & Ireland wins the Walker Cup

The 1971 Walker Cup, the 23rd Walker Cup Match, was played on 26 and 27 May 1971, on the Old Course at St Andrews, Scotland. The event was won by Great Britain & Ireland 13 to 11, their first win in the event since 1938.

Although Great Britain and Ireland won all the first morning foursomes, the United States won six of the eight singles and held a one point lead after the first day. The United States lead increased to two points after the second day foursomes. However Great Britain and Ireland won six of the eight singles matches to win the Walker Cup for the first time since World War II.

== Format ==
The format for play on Wednesday and Thursday was the same. There were four matches of foursomes in the morning and eight singles matches in the afternoon. In all, 24 matches were played.

Each of the 24 matches was worth one point in the larger team competition. If a match was all square after the 18th hole extra holes were not played. Rather, each side earned ½ a point toward their team total. The team that accumulated at least 12½ points won the competition. If the two teams were tied, the previous winner would retain the trophy.

== Teams ==
Ten players for the United States and Great Britain & Ireland participated in the event. Great Britain & Ireland had a playing captain, while the United States had a non-playing captain.

=== Great Britain & Ireland ===
&
Playing captain: (England) Michael Bonallack

- (Republic of Ireland) Roddy Carr
- (England) Rodney Foster
- (Scotland) Charlie Green
- (England) Warren Humphreys
- (Scotland) Scott Macdonald
- (Scotland) George Macgregor
- (England) Geoff Marks
- (England) David Marsh
- (Scotland) Hugh Stuart

=== United States ===
Captain: John M. Winters

- William C. Campbell
- John Farquhar
- Jim Gabrielsen
- Vinny Giles
- Bill Hyndman
- Tom Kite
- Steve Melnyk
- Allen Miller
- Jim Simons
- Lanny Wadkins

== Wednesday's matches ==
=== Morning foursomes ===
&	Results
Bonallack/Humphreys	(United Kingdom) (Republic of Ireland) 1 up	Wadkins/Simons
Green/Carr	(United Kingdom) (Republic of Ireland) 1 up	Melnyk/Giles
Marsh/Macgregor	(United Kingdom) (Republic of Ireland) 2 & 1	Miller/Farquhar
Macdonald/Foster	(United Kingdom) (Republic of Ireland) 2 & 1	Campbell/Kite
4	Foursomes	0
4	Overall	0

=== Afternoon singles ===
&	Results
Charlie Green	(United States) 1 up	Lanny Wadkins
Michael Bonallack	(United States) 1 up	Vinny Giles
Geoff Marks	(United States) 1 up	Allen Miller
Scott Macdonald	(United States) 3 & 2	Steve Melnyk
Roddy Carr	halved	Bill Hyndman
Warren Humphreys	(United States) 1 up	Jim Gabrielson
Hugh Stuart	(United Kingdom) (Republic of Ireland) 3 & 2	John Farquhar
Rodney Foster	(United States) 3 & 2	Tom Kite
1½	Singles	6½
5½	Overall	6½

== Thursday's matches ==
=== Morning foursomes ===
&	Results
Marks/Green	(United States) 1 up	Melnyk/Giles
Stuart/Carr	(United Kingdom) (Republic of Ireland) 1 up	Wadkins/Gabrielson
Marsh/Bonallack	(United States) 5 & 4	Miller/Farquhar
Macdonald/Foster	halved	Campbell/Kite
1½	Foursomes	2½
7	Overall	9

=== Afternoon singles ===
&	Results
Michael Bonallack	(United States) 3 & 1	Lanny Wadkins
Hugh Stuart	(United Kingdom) (Republic of Ireland) 2 & 1	Vinny Giles
Warren Humphreys	(United Kingdom) (Republic of Ireland) 2 & 1	Steve Melnyk
Charlie Green	(United Kingdom) (Republic of Ireland) 1 up	Allen Miller
Roddy Carr	(United Kingdom) (Republic of Ireland) 2 up	Jim Simons
George Macgregor	(United Kingdom) (Republic of Ireland) 1 up	Jim Gabrielson
David Marsh	(United Kingdom) (Republic of Ireland) 1 up	Bill Hyndman
Geoff Marks	(United States) 3 & 2	Tom Kite
6	Singles	2
13	Overall	11
