= Walker Cup =

Golf trophy

Tournament information
- Location: 2026: Lahinch, County Clare, Ireland
- Established: 1922
- Course: 2026: Lahinch Golf Club
- Organized by: The R&A and United States Golf Association
- Format: Match play
- Month played: September

Current champion
- Great Britain & Ireland

Current tournament
- 2026 Walker Cup

The Walker Cup is a golf trophy contested in even-numbered years by leading male amateur golfers in two teams: United States, and Great Britain and Ireland featuring players from the United Kingdom and Ireland. The official name is the Walker Cup Match (not "Matches" as in Ryder Cup Matches). It is organised by The R&A and the United States Golf Association (USGA). In 1921 the Royal Liverpool Golf Club hosted an unofficial contest which was followed by official annual contests from 1922 through 1924. From 1925, they became biennial, held on even-number years. After World War II they switched to odd-numbered years. From 2026, it will be held in even-numbered years following the switch of the Eisenhower Trophy to odd-numbered years to avoid that event clashing with the Olympic Games. They are held alternately in the U.S., and Ireland or Britain.

The cup is named after George Herbert Walker who was president of the USGA in 1920 when the match was initiated. Walker is the grandfather and namesake of George H. W. Bush and great-grandfather of George W. Bush, the 41st and 43rd Presidents of the United States.

Unlike the Ryder Cup, which similarly began as a competition between the U.S. and the United Kingdom, the Walker Cup has never been expanded to include all European amateur golfers.

As of 2026, the U.S. lead the Walker Cup series 40 to 10, with one match tied, but the two teams have been more evenly matched since 1989 when the Great Britain and Ireland team ended the U.S. team's eight-match winning run. The 1989 match, the three matches from 2003 to 2007 and the 2026 match were all decided by a single point.

== Founding of the Cup ==
=== Royal Liverpool (Hoylake) 1921 ===
A team of American amateur golfers travelled in Britain in 1921, their objective being to win The Amateur Championship at Royal Liverpool (Hoylake). A match between American and British male amateur golfers was played on May 21, immediately before The Amateur Championship. This match was announced in The Times on May 10. The Times reports that the match was arranged by Gershom Stewart M.P., Chairman of Royal Liverpool Golf Club.

The British team was: Tommy Armour, Colin Aylmer, Ernest Holderness, James Jenkins, Reymond de Montmorency, Gordon Simpson, Cyril Tolley and Roger Wethered. The American team was Chick Evans, William C. Fownes Jr. (Captain), Jesse Guilford, Paul M. Hunter, Bobby Jones, Francis Ouimet, J. Wood Platt, Fred Wright. The Americans won the match 9–3.

== Format ==
The Walker Cup employs a combination of foursomes (alternate-shot) and singles competition and was originally the format used for the professional equivalent Ryder Cup. Up to 1961, 36 holes matches were played: four foursomes on the first day and eight singles matches on the second day. From 1963, 18 hole matches were played, with four foursomes and eight singles matches on each day. In 2009, the number of singles matches on the second day was increased to 10, so that all members of the team play on this final afternoon.

== Results ==
Half points for halved matches were first awarded in 1971. Note that in the following table, half points for halved matches are included in the total scores prior to 1971 for consistency with later years. The following scores include halved matches: 1923: 1, 1926: 1, 1932: 3, 1934: 1, 1936: 3, 1938: 1, 1951: 3, 1957: 1, 1963: 4, 1965: 2, 1967: 4, 1969: 6

Year	Venue	Winning team	Score		Losing team	Captains
2026	Lahinch Golf Club	Great Britain & Ireland	13 1/2	12 1/2	United States	(United States) Nathan Smith (Scotland) Dean Robertson
2025	Cypress Point Club	United States	17	9	Great Britain & Ireland	(United States) Nathan Smith (Scotland) Dean Robertson
2023	Old Course at St Andrews	United States	14 1/2	11 1/2	Great Britain & Ireland	(United States) Mike McCoy (Scotland) Stuart Wilson
2021	Seminole Golf Club	United States	14	12	Great Britain & Ireland	(United States) Nathaniel Crosby (Scotland) Stuart Wilson
2019	Royal Liverpool Golf Club	United States	15 1/2	10 1/2	Great Britain & Ireland	(United States) Nathaniel Crosby (Scotland) Craig Watson
2017	Los Angeles Country Club	United States	19	7	Great Britain & Ireland	(United States) Spider Miller (Wales) Andy Ingram
2015	Royal Lytham & St Annes Golf Club	Great Britain & Ireland	16 1/2	9 1/2	United States	(United States) Spider Miller (Wales) Nigel Edwards
2013	National Golf Links of America	United States	17	9	Great Britain & Ireland	(United States) Jim Holtgrieve (Wales) Nigel Edwards
2011	Royal Aberdeen Golf Club	Great Britain & Ireland	14	12	United States	(United States) Jim Holtgrieve (Wales) Nigel Edwards
2009	Merion Golf Club	United States	16 1/2	9 1/2	Great Britain & Ireland	(United States) Buddy Marucci (Scotland) Colin Dalgleish
2007	Royal County Down Golf Club	United States	12 1/2	11 1/2	Great Britain & Ireland	(United States) Buddy Marucci (Scotland) Colin Dalgleish
2005	Chicago Golf Club	United States	12 1/2	11 1/2	Great Britain & Ireland	(United States) Bob Lewis (Northern Ireland) Garth McGimpsey
2003	Ganton Golf Club	Great Britain & Ireland	12 1/2	11 1/2	United States	(United States) Bob Lewis (Northern Ireland) Garth McGimpsey
2001	Ocean Forest Golf Club	Great Britain & Ireland	15	9	United States	(United States) Danny Yates (England) Peter McEvoy
1999	Nairn Golf Club	Great Britain & Ireland	15	9	United States	(United States) Danny Yates (England) Peter McEvoy
1997	Quaker Ridge Golf Club	United States	18	6	Great Britain & Ireland	(United States) Downing Gray (Wales) Clive Brown
1995	Royal Porthcawl Golf Club	Great Britain & Ireland	14	10	United States	(United States) Downing Gray (Wales) Clive Brown
1993	Interlachen Country Club	United States	19	5	Great Britain & Ireland	(United States) Vinny Giles (Scotland) George Macgregor
1991	Portmarnock Golf Club	United States	14	10	Great Britain & Ireland	(United States) Jim Gabrielsen (Scotland) George Macgregor
1989	Peachtree Golf Club	Great Britain & Ireland	12 1/2	11 1/2	United States	(United States) Fred Ridley (England) Geoff Marks
1987	Sunningdale Golf Club	United States	16 1/2	7 1/2	Great Britain & Ireland	(United States) Fred Ridley (England) Geoff Marks
1985	Pine Valley Golf Club	United States	13	11	Great Britain & Ireland	(United States) Jay Sigel (Scotland) Charlie Green
1983	Royal Liverpool Golf Club	United States	13 1/2	10 1/2	Great Britain & Ireland	(United States) Jay Sigel (Scotland) Charlie Green
1981	Cypress Point Club	United States	15	9	Great Britain & Ireland	(United States) Jim Gabrielsen (England) Rodney Foster
1979	Muirfield	United States	15 1/2	8 1/2	Great Britain & Ireland	(United States) Dick Siderowf (England) Rodney Foster
1977	Shinnecock Hills Golf Club	United States	16	8	Great Britain & Ireland	(United States) Lewis Oehmig (Scotland) Sandy Saddler
1975	Old Course at St Andrews	United States	15 1/2	8 1/2	Great Britain & Ireland	(United States) Ed Updegraff (England) David Marsh
1973	The Country Club	United States	14	10	Great Britain & Ireland	(United States) Jess Sweetser (England) David Marsh
1971	Old Course at St Andrews	Great Britain & Ireland	13	11	United States	(United States) John M. Winters (England) Michael Bonallack
1969	Milwaukee Country Club	United States	13	11	Great Britain & Ireland	(United States) Billy Joe Patton (England) Michael Bonallack
1967	Royal St George's Golf Club	United States	15	9	Great Britain & Ireland	(United States) Jess Sweetser (Republic of Ireland) Joe Carr
1965	Baltimore Country Club	United States	12	12	Great Britain & Ireland	(United States) Johnny Fischer (Republic of Ireland) Joe Carr
1963	Turnberry	United States	14	10	Great Britain & Ireland	(United States) Richard Tufts (Scotland) Charles Lawrie
1961	Seattle Golf Club	United States	11	1	Great Britain & Ireland	(United States) Jack Westland (Scotland) Charles Lawrie
1959	Muirfield	United States	9	3	Great Britain & Ireland	(United States) Charles Coe (England) Gerald Micklem
1957	The Minikahda Club	United States	8 1/2	3 1/2	Great Britain & Ireland	(United States) Charles Coe (England) Gerald Micklem
1955	Old Course at St Andrews	United States	10	2	Great Britain & Ireland	(United States) William C. Campbell (England) Alec Hill
1953	The Kittansett Club	United States	9	3	Great Britain & Ireland	(United States) Charlie Yates (Wales) Tony Duncan
1951	Royal Birkdale Golf Club	United States	7 1/2	4 1/2	Great Britain & Ireland	(United States) Willie Turnesa (England) Raymond Oppenheimer
1949	Winged Foot Golf Club	United States	10	2	Great Britain & Ireland	(United States) Francis Ouimet (England) Laddie Lucas
1947	Old Course at St Andrews	United States	8	4	Great Britain & Ireland	(United States) Francis Ouimet (England) John Beck
1940–1946: Not held due to World War II
1940	Town & Country Club	1940 event was awarded to The Town & Country Club of St. Paul, Minnesota but the matches were canceled due to World War II				
1938	Old Course at St Andrews	Great Britain & Ireland	7 1/2	4 1/2	United States	(United States) Francis Ouimet (England) John Beck
1936	Pine Valley Golf Club	United States	10 1/2	1 1/2	Great Britain & Ireland	(United States) Francis Ouimet (England) William Tweddell
1934	Old Course at St Andrews	United States	9 1/2	2 1/2	Great Britain & Ireland	(United States) Francis Ouimet (England) Michael Scott
1932	The Country Club	United States	9 1/2	2 1/2	Great Britain & Ireland	(United States) Francis Ouimet (Scotland) Tony Torrance
1930	Royal St George's Golf Club	United States	10	2	Great Britain & Ireland	(United States) Bobby Jones (England) Roger Wethered
1928	Chicago Golf Club	United States	11	1	Great Britain & Ireland	(United States) Bobby Jones (England) William Tweddell
1926	Old Course at St Andrews	United States	6 1/2	5 1/2	Great Britain & Ireland	(United States) Robert Gardner (Scotland) Robert Harris
1924	Garden City Golf Club	United States	9	3	Great Britain & Ireland	(United States) Robert Gardner (England) Cyril Tolley
1923	Old Course at St Andrews	United States	6 1/2	5 1/2	Great Britain & Ireland	(United States) Robert Gardner (Scotland) Robert Harris
1922	National Golf Links of America	United States	8	4	Great Britain & Ireland	(United States) William C. Fownes Jr. (Scotland) Robert Harris

Of the 51 matches, USA has won 40 matches, Great Britain and Ireland have won 10 with 1 match tied.

== Future sites ==
- 2028 – Bandon Dunes Golf Resort (Bandon, Oregon)
- 2030 – Prince's Golf Club (Sandwich, England)
- 2032 – Oakmont Country Club (Oakmont, Pennsylvania)
- 2036 – Chicago Golf Club (Wheaton, Illinois)
- 2040 – National Golf Links of America (Southampton, New York)
- 2044 – Pine Valley Golf Club (Pine Valley, New Jersey)
- 2048 – Cypress Point Club (Pebble Beach, California)
- 2052 – Seminole Golf Club (Juno Beach, Florida)

From 2026, matches will be held in even-numbered years.

== See also ==
- List of American Walker Cup golfers
- List of Great Britain and Ireland Walker Cup golfers
- Curtis Cup
