= Nantucket Regional Transit Authority =

- Parent: Massachusetts Department of Transportation
- Founded: 1993
- Headquarters: 20-R S. Water Street, Nantucket, MA 02554
- Locale: Nantucket, Massachusetts
- Service type: Bus service, paratransit
- Routes: 9
- Hubs: Greenhound Building
- Fleet: 23 buses
- Fuel type: Electric and diesel
- Operator: •Valley Transportation Services of Massachusetts, Inc.1995-2026 •Kelios North America 2026-Present
- Chief executive: Town Of Nantucket
- Administrator: Gary Roberts (Feb 2023)
- Website: nrtawave.com

The Nantucket Regional Transit Authority (NRTA) is the public transport authority serving the island of Nantucket, Massachusetts. It operates a small network of shuttle buses and paratransit service year-round.

The NRTA's shuttle bus service, The Wave (also referred to as the NRTA Wave), is branded using blue and white colors. Paratransit service is branded as Your Island Ride using red and white livery.

== History ==
NRTA was created by Massachusetts General Laws Chapter 161B in 1993, but did not begin to operate until 1995, when it had only four buses operating on two seasonal routes.

The Wave began year-round fixed-route operation on April 27, 2018. Prior to that date, only Your Island Ride was available year-round.

In February 2026 it was announced after 30 years the contract with the NRTA’s original operator Valley Transportation of Massachusetts inc. (vts)contact expired and was awarded to Kelios North America a division of French Transport Company (Keolis SA) to help with operational demand and better benefits for drivers and staff.

== Services ==
The Wave operates three year-round and six seasonal fixed-route bus services, operated by Valley Transportation Services of Massachusetts (VTS of MA)(now Kelios North America).Buses serve various points around the island, including Madaket, Miacomet, Nantucket Memorial Airport, and Siasconset.

The "Your Island Ride" paratransit service for persons with disabilities and seniors has been operational year-round since 2001. It operates as a door-to-door service for those unable to access fixed-route services.

== Fares ==
Fares on The Wave vary by $2 to $3 per route, with one-day, three-day, and seven-day passes also being available. Individuals may pay a half fare if they are 65 or older, have a disability, or are a veteran or active military personnel. Children 6 and under ride for free. Your Island Ride varies by $1 to $2 depending on the time of service.
