= Birmingham Country Club =

Birmingham Country Club

- Birmingham Country Club (Alabama)
- Birmingham Country Club (Michigan)
