= Auld Lang Syne (disambiguation) =

"Auld Lang Syne" is a poem by Robert Burns and set to the tune of a traditional folk song.

Auld Lang Syne may also refer to:

== Film ==
- Auld Lang Syne, a 1911 American silent film directed by Laurence Trimble
- Auld Lang Syne (1917 film), a British silent film directed by Sidney Morgan
- Auld Lang Syne (1929 film), a British film directed by George Pearson
- Auld Lang Syne (1937 film), a British film directed by James A. FitzPatrick
- Snoopy Presents: For Auld Lang Syne, a 2021 film

== Music ==
- Auld Lang Syne (Bing Crosby album), 1948
- Auld Lang Syne (Suidakra album), 1998
- "Auld Lang Syne (The New Year's Anthem)", a song by Mariah Carey, 2010
- "Same Old Lang Syne, song by Dan Fogelberg, 1980

== Other uses ==
- Auld Lang Syne (comics), a comic based on the television series Angel
- Auld Lang Syne (house), a historic house on Nantucket, Massachusetts, US
- Auld Lang Syne, a variant of the solitaire card game Sir Tommy
