= U.S. Senior Amateur =

Golf tournament

The U.S. Senior Amateur is a national tournament for amateur golf competitors at least 55 years of age. It is operated by the United States Golf Association (USGA).

The tournament starts with 36 holes of stroke play, with the top 64 competitors advancing to the match play portion of the tournament. Golfers must have a USGA handicap index of 7.4 or lower to enter.

The tournament was founded in 1955, expanding on a tournament conducted by the U.S. Senior Golf Association (not affiliated with the USGA), which itself had grown from a senior amateur event at the Apawamis Club in 1905. Membership in this precursor tournament was limited, so the USGA agreed to start a national championship open to all senior golfers.

Senior Amateur contestants have been permitted to ride in carts since 1969.

Winners received exemptions to the following events: next year's U.S. Senior Open provided he still is an amateur; U.S. Amateur for the following two years; U.S. Mid-Amateur for this year and next year; and the next 10 years of the U.S. Senior Amateur.

== Winners ==
| Year | Venue | Winner | Score | Runner-up |
|---|---|---|---|---|
| 2026 | Baltimore Country Club, East Course at Five Farms (MD) | Mike Sposa | 3 & 2 | Todd White |
| 2025 | Oak Hills Country Club (TX) | Mike McCoy | 3 & 2 | Greg Sanders |
| 2024 | Honors Course (TN) | Louis Brown | 4 & 3 | Dan Sullivan |
| 2023 | Martis Camp Club (CA) | Todd White | 4 & 3 | Jody Fanagan |
| 2022 | Kittansett Club (MA) | Rusty Strawn | 3 & 2 | Doug Hanzel |
| 2021 | Country Club of Detroit (MI) | Gene Elliott | 1 up | Jerry Gunthorpe |
| 2020 | Country Club of Detroit | Canceled due to the COVID-19 pandemic | | |
| 2019 | Old Chatham Golf Club (NC) | Bob Royak | 1 up | Roger Newsom |
| 2018 | Eugene Country Club (OR) | Jeff Wilson | 2 & 1 | Sean Knapp |
| 2017 | The Minikahda Club (MN) | Sean Knapp | 2 & 1 | Paul Simson |
| 2016 | Old Warson Country Club (MO) | Dave Ryan | 5 & 3 | Matthew Sughrue |
| 2015 | Hidden Creek Golf Club (NJ) | Chip Lutz | 5 & 3 | Tom Brandes |
| 2014 | Big Canyon Country Club (CA) | Patrick Tallent | 2 & 1 | Bryan Norton |
| 2013 | Wade Hampton Golf Club (NC) | Doug Hanzel | 3 & 2 | Pat O'Donnell |
| 2012 | Mountain Ridge Country Club (NJ) | Paul Simson | 4 & 3 | Curtis Skinner |
| 2011 | Kinloch Golf Club (VA) | Louis Lee | 1 up | Philip Pleat |
| 2010 | Lake Nona Golf & Country Club (FL) | Paul Simson | 2 & 1 | Patrick Tallent |
| 2009 | Beverly Country Club (IL) | Vinny Giles | 1 up | John Grace |
| 2008 | Shady Oaks Country Club (TX) | Buddy Marucci | 2 up | George Zahringer |
| 2007 | Flint Hills National Golf Club (KS) | Stan Lee | 4 & 3 | Sam Farlow |
| 2006 | Victoria National Golf Club (IN) | Mike Bell | 1 up | Tom McGraw |
| 2005 | The Farm (GA) | Mike Rice | 1 up | Mark Bemowski |
| 2004 | Bel-Air Country Club (CA) | Mark Bemowski | 4 & 3 | Greg Reynolds |
| 2003 | The Virginian Golf Club (VA) | Kemp Richardson | 19th hole | Frank Abbott |
| 2002 | Timuquana Country Club (FL) | Greg Reynolds | 4 & 3 | Mark Bemowski |
| 2001 | Norwood Hills Country Club (MO) | Kemp Richardson | 2 & 1 | Bill Ploeger |
| 2000 | Charlotte Country Club (NC) | Bill Shean Jr. | 2 & 1 | Richard Van Leuvan |
| 1999 | Portland Golf Club (OR) | Bill Ploeger | 3 & 2 | Gary Menzel |
| 1998 | Skokie Country Club (IL) | Bill Shean Jr. | 5 & 3 | William King |
| 1997 | Atlantic Golf Club (NY) | Cliff Cunningham | 5 & 3 | Ed Bartlett |
| 1996 | Taconic Golf Club (MA) | O. Gordon Brewer Jr. | 2 up | Heyward Sullivan |
| 1995 | Prairie Dunes Country Club (KS) | James Stahl Jr. | 2 & 1 | Rennie Law |
| 1994 | Champions Golf Club (KY) | O. Gordon Brewer Jr. | 5 & 4 | Bob Hullender |
| 1993 | Farmington Country Club (VA) | Joe Ungvary | 7 & 6 | Jerry Nelson |
| 1992 | The Loxahatchee Club (FL) | Clarence Moore | 6 & 4 | Robert Harris |
| 1991 | Crystal Downs Country Club (MI) | Bill Bosshard | 5 & 4 | Morris Beecroft |
| 1990 | Desert Forest Golf Club (AZ) | Jackie Cummings | 3 & 2 | Bobby Clark |
| 1989 | Lochinvar Golf Club (TX) | R. S. Williams | 19th hole | Joe Simpson |
| 1988 | Milwaukee Country Club (WI) | Clarence Moore | 5 & 4 | Bud Stevens |
| 1987 | Saucon Valley Country Club (PA) | John Richardson | 5 & 4 | James Kite Jr. |
| 1986 | Interlachen Country Club (MN) | R. S. Williams | 3 & 2 | John Harbottle |
| 1985 | Wild Dunes Beach & Racquet Club (SC) | Lewis Oehmig | 20th hole | Ed Hopkins |
| 1984 | Birmingham Country Club (MI) | Robert Rawlins | 19th hole | Richard Runkle |
| 1983 | Crooked Stick Golf Club (IN) | Bill Hyndman | 1 up | Richard Runkle |
| 1982 | Tucson Country Club (AZ) | Alton Duhon | 2 up | Ed Updegraff |
| 1981 | Seattle Golf Club (WA) | Ed Updegraff | 2 & 1 | Dale Morey |
| 1980 | The Homestead (Cascades Course) (VA) | William C. Campbell | 3 & 2 | Keith K. Compton |
| 1979 | Chicago Golf Club (IL) | William C. Campbell | 2 & 1 | Lewis Oehmig |
| 1978 | Pine Tree Golf Club (FL) | Keith K. Compton | 1 up | John W. Kline |
| 1977 | Salem Country Club (MA) | Dale Morey | 4 & 3 | Lewis Oehmig |
| 1976 | Cherry Hills Country Club (CO) | Lewis Oehmig | 4 & 3 | John Richardson |
| 1975 | Carmel Valley Golf & Country Club (CA) | William F. Colm | 4 & 3 | Stephen Stimac |
| 1974 | Harbour Town Golf Links (SC) | Dale Morey | 4 & 2 | Lewis Oehmig |
| 1973 | Onwentsia Club (IL) | Bill Hyndman | 3 & 2 | Harry Welch |
| 1972 | Sharon Golf Club (OH) | Lewis Oehmig | 20th hole | Ernest Pieper Jr. |
| 1971 | Sunnybrook Golf Club (PA) | Tom Draper | 3 & 1 | Ernest Pieper Jr. |
| 1970 | California Golf Club of San Francisco (CA) | Gene Andrews | 1 up | James Ferrie |
| 1969 | Wichita Country Club (KS) | Curtis Person, Sr. | 1 up | David Goldman |
| 1968 | Atlanta Country Club (GA) | Curtis Person, Sr. | 2 & 1 | Ben Goodes |
| 1967 | Shinnecock Hills Golf Club (NY) | Ray Palmer | 3 & 2 | Walter D. Bronson |
| 1966 | Tucson National Golf Club (AZ) | Dexter H. Daniels | 1 up | George Beechler |
| 1965 | Fox Chapel Golf Club (PA) | Robert B. Kiersky | 19th hole | George Beechler |
| 1964 | Waverley Country Club (OR) | William D. Higgins | 2 & 1 | Edward Murphy |
| 1963 | Sea Island Golf Club (GA) | Merrill L. Carlsmith | 3 & 2 | William D. Higgins |
| 1962 | Evanston Golf Club (IL) | Merrill L. Carlsmith | 4 & 2 | Willis H. Blakely |
| 1961 | Southern Hills Country Club (OK) | Dexter H. Daniels | 2 & 1 | William K. Lanman |
| 1960 | Oyster Harbors Club (MA) | Michael Cestone | 20th hole | David Rose |
| 1959 | Memphis Country Club (TN) | J. Clark Espie | 3 & 1 | J. Wolcott Brown |
| 1958 | Monterey Peninsula Country Club (CA) | Thomas C. Robbins | 2 & 1 | Johnny Dawson |
| 1957 | Ridgewood Country Club (NJ) | J. Clark Espie | 2 & 1 | Fred Wright |
| 1956 | Somerset Country Club (MN) | Fred Wright | 4 & 3 | J. Clark Espie |
| 1955 | Belle Meade Country Club (TN) | J. Wood Platt | 5 & 4 | George Studinger |

== Multiple winners ==
- 3 wins: Lewis Oehmig
- 2 wins: J. Clark Espie, Merrill L. Carlsmith, Dexter H. Daniels, Curtis Person, Sr., Dale Morey, William C. Campbell, Bill Hyndman, R. S. Williams, Clarence Moore, O. Gordon Brewer Jr., Bill Shean Jr., Kemp Richardson, Paul Simson

== Future sites ==
| Year | Edition | Course | Location | Dates |
|---|---|---|---|---|
| 2027 | 72nd | Seattle Golf Club | Shoreline, Washington | August 28–September 2 |
| 2028 | 73rd | Biltmore Forest Country Club | Asheville, North Carolina | August 26–31 |
| 2029 | 74th | The Homestead (Cascades Course) | Hot Springs, Virginia | August 25–30 |
| 2030 | 75th | Country Club of North Carolina | Pinehurst, North Carolina | August 24–29 |
| 2032 | 77th | Country Club of Buffalo | Williamsville, New York | August 28–September 2 |
| 2033 | 78th | Canterbury Golf Club | Cleveland, Ohio | August 27–September 1 |
| 2034 | 79th | Portland Golf Club | Portland, Oregon | August 26–31 |
| 2035 | 80th | Columbia Country Club | Chevy Chase, Maryland | August 25–30 |
| 2036 | 81st | Belle Meade Country Club | Nashville, Tennessee | August 23–28 |
| 2038 | 83rd | Quaker Ridge Golf Club | Scarsdale, New York | TBD |
