= Pennsylvania Amateur =

The Pennsylvania Amateur Golf Championship is an annual golf tournament in the state of Pennsylvania.

Jay Sigel won the event a record 11 times.

== Winners ==
Year	Champion	Score	Runner(s)-up	Venue	Ref.
2024	Patrick Sheehan	207	Jon Rusk	Huntingdon Valley CC	
2023	Gregor Meyer	204	Tanner Grzegorczyk, William Pabst	Pittsburgh Field Club	
2022	Neal Shipley	208	Rij Patel, Nathan Piatt	Llanerch Country Club	
2021	John Peters	210	Mark Goetz, Patrick Sheehan	Merion Golf Club	
2020	Michael Brown Jr.	206	Rick Stimmel, Will Davenport	Lookaway Golf Club	
2019	Christopher Tanabe	205	Kyle Vance, Nate Menon	Aronimink Golf Club	
2018	Connor Schmidt	203	Anthony Sebastianelli	Sunnehanna Country Club	
2017	J. D. Hughes	203	Cole Miller, Chris Ault	White Manor Country Club	
2016	Cole Miller	200	J. D. Dornes	Moselem Springs Golf Club	
2015	Isaiah Logue	207	P. J. Acierno	Country Club of Scranton	
2014	John Sawin	214	Arnie Cutrell, Kyle Sterbinsky	Oakmont Country Club	
2013	Chris Ault	213	Brandon Matthews, David Denlinger	Saucon Valley Country Club	
2012	Andrew Mason	205	Daniel Charen	Rolling Green Golf Club	
2011	Andrew Mason	210	Matthew Burkhart	Lancaster Country Club	
2010	Cory Siegfried	208	Grant Martens	Nemacolin Woodlands	
2009	Nathan Smith	206	Robert Rohanna	Waynesborough Country Club	
2008	Mike Van Sickle	211	Nathan Smith	Saucon Valley Country Club	
2007	Adam Hofmann	208	Nathan Smith	Longue Vue Club	
2006	Chad Bricker	208	Chris Schultz, Kyle Davis	Moselem Spring Golf Club	
2005	Alex Knoll	208	Randall Rolfe, Dan Walters	Huntingdon Valley Country Club	
2004	Blaine Peffley	200	Sean R. Knapp	Fox Chapel Golf Club	
2003	Brandon Knaub	204	James Bohn	Country Club of Scranton	
2002	Nathan Smith	215	John G. Jones	Oakmont Country Club	
Format change from 72-hole stroke play to 54-hole stroke play
2001	Peter A. Toole	278	Nathan Smith, John Sweeney	Berkshire Country Club	
2000	Michael McDermott	289	Steve Wheatcroft	Lancaster Country Club	
1999	Chris Lange	219	Craig Cochran	Treesdale Country Club	
1998	Paul Schlachter	287	Sean Knapp	Bent Creek Country Club	
1997	Sean R. Knapp	283	Rick Stimmel	Country Club of Scranton	
1996	Rick Stimmel	282	Jeff Schroder	Lake View Country Club	
1995	James Spagnolo	286	Sean R. Knapp	Huntingdon Valley Country Club	
1994	John G. Jones III	281	David Brookreson	Pittsburgh Field Club	
1993	Jason Tyska	283	Vince Zachetti	Lancaster Country Club	
1992	Frank Fuhrer III	290	Warren Choate	Fox Chapel Country Club	
1991	George Marucci	272	Jay Sigel	Gulph Mills Golf Club	
1990	Warren Choate	286	David M. Patterson	Pittsburgh Field Club	
1989	Vince Zachetti	284	Wayne Bartolacci	Sunnybrook Country Club	
1988	Don Erickson III	283	Arnold Cutrell	Lancaster Country Club	
1987	George Marucci	293	Curt Culter	Oakmont Country Club	
1986	James Hagstrom	286	Ted Tryba	Merion Golf Club	
1985	Bob Friend	276	Ted Tryba	Longue Vue Club	
1984	O. Gordon Brewer Jr.	296	Chuck Scally Jr.	Huntingdon Valley Country Club	
1983	George Marucci	297	Rocco Mediate	Pittsburgh Field Club	
1982	George Marucci	282	Billy Musto	Sunnybrook Country Club	
1981	Jay Sigel	226	Dick Von Tacky Jr.	Oakmont Country Club	
1980	Charlie Bolling	284	Dick Von Tacky Jr.	Lancaster Country Club	
1979	Jay Sigel	209	Warren Choate	Manufacturers Golf and Country Club	
1978	Jay Sigel	283	James Spagnolo	Westmoreland Country Club	
1977	Frank Fuhrer III	294	Duke Delcher & Warren Choate	Merion Golf Club	
1976	Jay Sigel	221	Mike Nicolette	Sewickley Heights Country Club	
1975	Jay Sigel	212	Steve Brewton	Huntingdon Valley Country Club	
1974	Jay Sigel	300	John Birmingham	Oakmont Country Club	
1973	Jay Sigel	297	Fred Von Bargen	Philadelphia Cricket	
1972	Jay Sigel	268	John Birmingham	Allegheny Country Club	
1971	Dudley Merchant	287	Jay Sigel	Fox Chapel Country Club	
1970	Jim Simons	145	Jay Sigel	Sunnybrook Country Club	
1969	Jim Simons	281	John Birmingham	Longue Vue Club	
1968	Jay Sigel	291	Andy Thompson	Waynesborough Country Club	
1967	Richard Stephens	295	Tommy Smith	Oakmont Country Club	
1966	Jay Sigel	298	Harry Toscano	Lancaster Country Club	
Format change from match play to 72-hole stroke play
1965	John Birmingham	2 & 1	Jay Sigel	Allegheny Country Club	
1964	Harry Toscano	6 & 5	Allan Sussel	Huntingdon Valley Country Club	
1963	Richard Stephens	5 & 4	F. W. Arasin	Fox Chapel Country Club	
1962	Jay Sigel	37 holes	Harry Toscano	Merion Golf Club	
1961	John Birmingham	19 holes	Frank Souchak	Pittsburgh Field Club	
1960	Bob Batdorff II	19 holes	Harvey Smith	Philadelphia Cricke	
1959	Bob Batdorff II	2 & 1	Fred Paine	Allegheny Country Club	
1958	John Dyniewski	2 & 1	Fred Paine	Philadelphia Cricket	
1957	John Dyniewski	20 holes	Fred Paine	Oakmont Country Club	
1956	Howard Everitt	3 & 2	N.H. Steward III	Merion Golf Club	
1955	Fred Paine	2 & 1	Tommy Smith	Sunnehanna Country Club	
1954	James D. Sykes	3 & 2	Dick Sperry	Philadelphia Cricket	
1953	Pete Jordan	5 & 3	Jack Mahaffey Jr.	Longue Vue Club	
1952	John Guenther Jr.	3 & 2	Lynn Creason	Berkshire Country Club	
1951	Jim Gardner	2 & 1	Frank Rizak	Allegheny Country Club	
1950	H. H. Haverstick	3 & 1	Neil White	Philadelphia Cricket	
1949	Art Wall Jr.	1 up	Howard Everitt	Fox Chapel Country Club	
1948	H. H. Haverstick Jr.	4 & 3	W. B. McCullough Jr.	Lancaster Country Club	
1947	Art Wall Jr.	1 up	Lynn Creason	Pittsburgh Field Golf Club	
1946	Howard Everitt	3 & 2	Ed Gonsky	Philadelphia Country Club	
1943–1945: No tournament due to World War II
1942	Knox M. Young Jr.	2 up	T.S. Jamison Jr.	Oakmont Country Club	
1941	Steve Kovach	3 & 2	Bill Hyndman	Aronimink Golf Club	
1940	Knox M. Young Jr.	n/a	n/a	Allegheny Country Club	
1939	Frank Allan	2 up	Steve Kovach	Huntingdon Valley Country Club	
1938	H. H. Haverstick Jr.	4 & 3	J.C. Benson	Fox Chapel Country Club	
1937	W. B. McCullough Jr.	6 & 5	Kean Donnelly	Lancaster Country Club	
1936	Alton Lyons	5 & 3	Burt Parker	Allegheny Country Club	
1935	J. Wood Platt	4 & 2	Perry E. Hall	Aronimink Golf Club	
1934	H. L. Beyer Jr.	4 & 2	J. R. Royston Jr.	Fox Chapel Country Club	
1933	Will Gunn Jr.	n/a	Harold S. Cross Jr.	Merion Cricket Club	
1932	Chris Brinke	3 & 2	G.H. Flinn Jr.	Oakmont Country Club	
1931	H. L. Beyer Jr.	5 & 3	W. B. McCullough	Aronimink Golf Club	
1930	Greer Mcllvain	1 up	Watts Gunn	Allegheny Country Club	
1929	S.D. Herron	1 up	Hugh Hamill	Merion Golf Club	
1928	J. W. Crookston	3 & 2	William C. Fownes Jr.	Oakmont Country Club	
1927	A. R. Maxwell	5 & 4	E. D. Leisenring	Merion Cricket Club	
1926	J. M. Robbins	2 up	H. H. Pearce	Allegheny Country Club	
1925	William J. Platt	6 & 5	William McIntire	Philmont Country Club	
1924	J. W. Crookston	6 & 5	William C. Fownes Jr.	Oakmont Country Club	
1923	Max Marston	6 & 5	D. C. Corkran	Huntingdon Valley Country Club	
1922	Max Marston	6 & 5	Ormiston	Allegheny Country Club	
1921	Max Marston	2 up	C. A. Reckner	Merion Cricket Club	
1920	S. D. Herron	5 & 3	Maxwell Marston	Oakmont Country Club	
1919	Patrick Grant	3 & 2	Paul Tewksbury	Whitemarsh Valley Country Club	
1917–1918: No tournament due to World War I
1916	William C. Fownes Jr.	1 up	J. B. Crookston	Allegheny Country Club	
1915	F. W. Dyer	5 & 3	J. F. Byers	Shawnee Country Club	
1914	H. W. Croft Jr.	5 & 3	J. B. Crookston	Oakmont Country Club	
1913	William C. Fownes Jr.	3 & 1	H. B. McFarland	Philadelphia Cricket	
1912	William C. Fownes Jr.	5 & 4	G. A. Ormiston	Oakmont Country Club	
1911	Henry Heyburn	3 & 2	Wirt L. Thompson	Huntingdon Valley Country Club	
1910	William C. Fownes Jr.	4 & 3	G. A. Ormiston	Allegheny Country Club	
1909	Harold B. McFarland	8 & 6	A. W. Tillinghast	Huntingdon Valley Country Club	
