= Saucon Valley Country Club =

Country club in Upper Saucon Township, Pennsylvania

Coordinates: 40.5537°N 75.3771°W

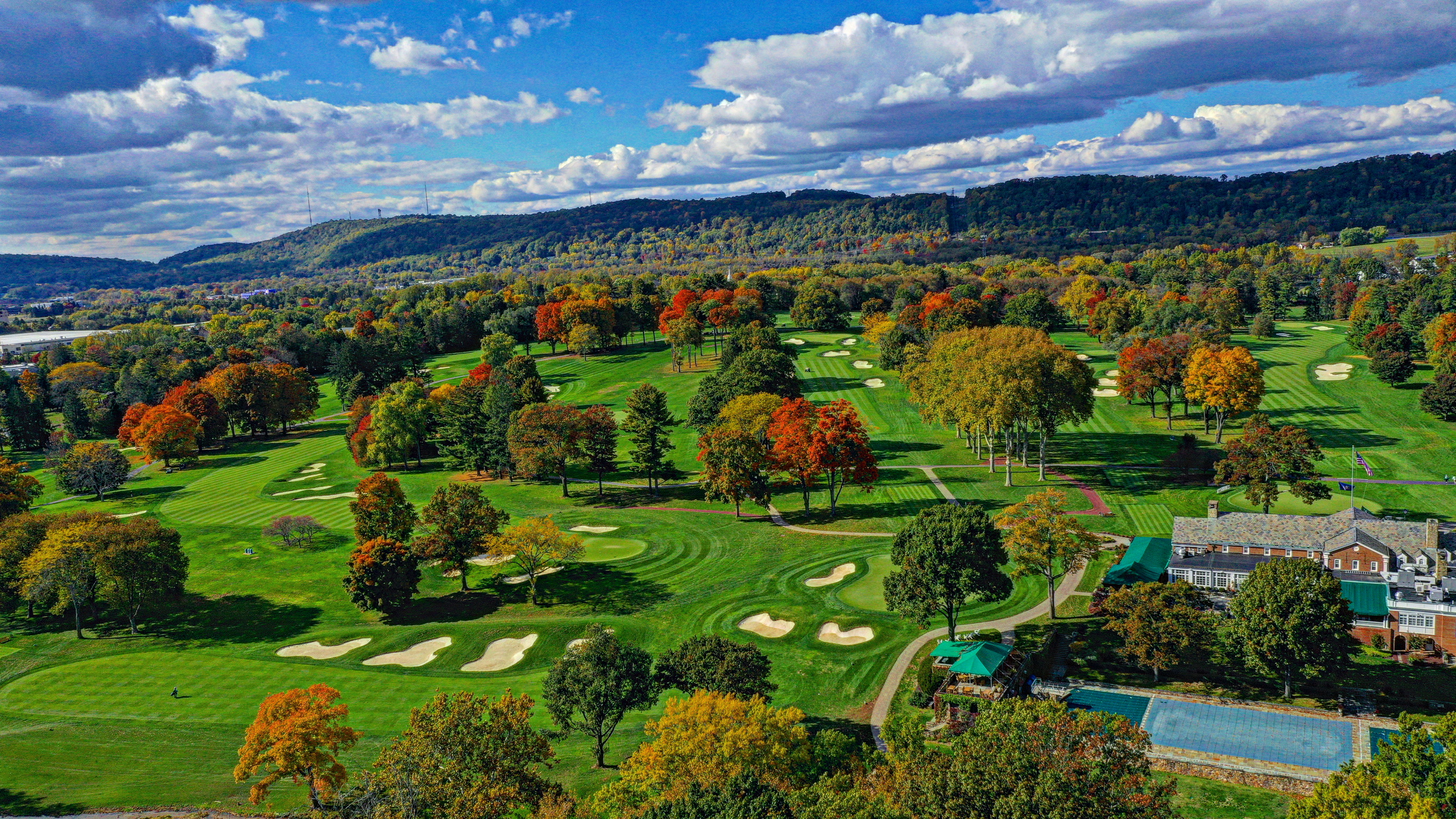
- Fall on the Old Course (2022)
- Interactive map of Saucon Valley Country Club

Club information
- Location: Upper Saucon Township, Pennsylvania, U.S.
- Established: 1920
- Type: Private
- Total holes: 60
- Tournaments: U.S. Amateur (1951); U.S. Junior Amateur (1983, 2026); U.S. Senior Amateur (1987); U.S. Mid-Amateur (2014); U.S. Senior Open (1992, 2000, 2022); U.S. Women's Open (2009)
- Website: Saucon Valley Country Club

Old Course
- Designer: Herbert Strong
- Par: 71
- Length: 7,129
- Course rating: 74.6

Grace Course
- Designer: William Gordon
- Par: 72
- Length: 7,091
- Course rating: 73.9

Weyhill Course
- Designer: David Gordon and William Gordon
- Par: 72
- Length: 7,099
- Course rating: 75.0

Saucon Valley Country Club is a country club in Upper Saucon Township in the Lehigh Valley region of eastern Pennsylvania near both Allentown and Bethlehem. Its facilities include three 18-hole golf courses and a six-hole beginners course.

The old course has hosted nine United States Golf Association (USGA) tournaments, including the 1992, 2000, and 2022 U.S. Senior Opens. In 2009, it was the site of the U.S. Women's Open. Five years later, it was the host of the U.S. Mid-Amateur. Saucon Valley Country Club is also the home site of the Lehigh University golf team. All three of Saucon Valley's 18-hole courses have made appearances on golf magazine rankings of top courses.

== History ==
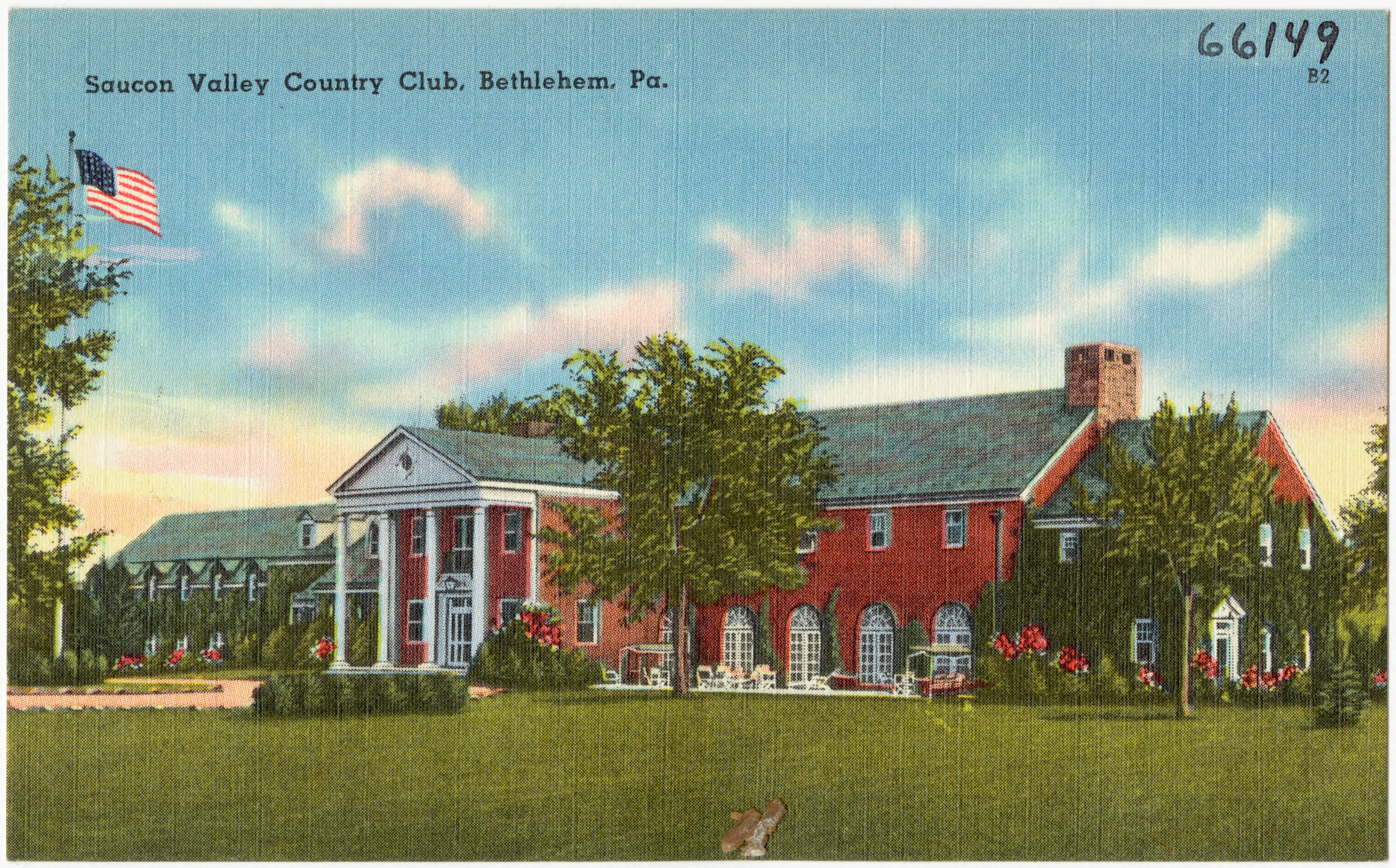
Early postcard drawing of Saucon Valley Country Club, c. 1930 to 1945

Saucon Valley Country Club was founded in 1920 by a group of local businessmen, mostly from Bethlehem Steel. Architect Herbert Strong was hired to design the Saucon Course, now known as the Old Course. Construction of the course concluded in 1921, and it was opened the following year. A fire destroyed Saucon Valley's clubhouse in January 1928; construction on a replacement building began shortly after the fire, and was finished in 1929. The club elected to build a second course after World War II, due to an increase in membership. William Gordon was the architect, working with his son David. The first nine holes of the Grace Course, named after founding member Eugene Grace, were finished in 1953; five years later, the last nine holes were completed. The Weyhill Course, the third 18-hole course built at the club, opened in 1968.

== Courses ==
The Old Course used to be a 6,799-yard course, but after renovations that added more than 300 yards of length, it is now 7,129 yards with a par of 71. Among its holes are three par-fives that are more than 550 yards. The Grace Course is a 7,091-yard par 72, which Links Magazine describes as "a big hitters' paradise". The Weyhill Course is a par-72 that measures out to 7,099 yards. ,

== Events hosted ==
The USGA has held eight national tournaments at Saucon Valley Country Club's Old Course. The first USGA event played at Saucon Valley was the 1951 U.S. Amateur, which was won by future PGA Tour player Billy Maxwell. In 1983, the Old Course hosted the U.S. Junior Amateur; it was won by Tim Straub. Four years later, John Richardson won the U.S. Senior Amateur at the club.

Saucon Valley hosted its first U.S. Senior Open, a major championship on the Senior PGA Tour (now known as the PGA Tour Champions), in 1992. With a four-day total score of 275 (nine-under-par), Larry Laoretti won the tournament by four strokes over Dave Stockton. The U.S. Senior Open returned to Saucon Valley in 2000, when Hale Irwin won the event by three strokes; his total score of 267 (17-under-par) broke the tournament's scoring record. In July 2009, Saucon Valley hosted the U.S. Women's Open, a major championship on the Ladies Professional Golf Association (LPGA) Tour. South Korean Eun-Hee Ji made a 20-foot birdie putt on the last hole of the tournament to win by one stroke. The course received a positive reception from players following the U.S. Women's Open. The Old and Weyhill Courses hosted the U.S. Mid-Amateur in 2014. Both courses were used for the stroke play part of the competition, while the 64-man match play was held on the Old Course. Scott Harvey was the tournament's champion. Saucon Valley became the first club to host the U.S. Senior Open for a third time in 2022. Pádraig Harrington posted a one-stroke victory over Steve Stricker. Four years later, the Old Course hosted a second U.S. Junior Amateur, with Noah Maclauchlan the champion.

The club serves as the site of home matches for the golf team of Lehigh University, the college attended by Eugene Grace, the president of Bethlehem Steel when Saucon Valley Country Club was founded. On four occasions—1996, 2003, 2008, and 2013—Saucon Valley hosted the men's golf championship of Lehigh's athletic conference, the Patriot League, which Lehigh won in 2013. The Old Course has also played host to the Pennsylvania Amateur Championship twice, in 2008 and 2013.

== Other facilities ==
In addition to its three 18-hole courses, the club has a six-hole Short Course, which is aimed at beginning golfers. There are 16 tennis courts at the club, along with four swimming pools. Saucon Valley also has squash and platform tennis courts.

== Rankings ==
The Old and Grace courses have appeared numerous times on golf magazine listings of leading golf courses in the U.S. In 1995 and 1997, Golf Magazine named the Grace Course one of the "Top 100 Courses in the U.S." The course was selected as one of "America's 100 Best Classical Courses" by Golfweek magazine each year from 1997 to 1999. The Old Course joined the Grace Course in Golf Magazine's' "Top 100 Courses in the U.S." ranking in 1995; Baltusrol Golf Club and Winged Foot Golf Club are the only other private clubs that have had multiple courses on the publication's list. Golfweek placed the Old Course on its "America's 100 Best Classical Courses" annually from 1997 to 1999, along with the Grace Course. After renovations in preparation for the 2009 U.S. Women's Open, the Old Course won the 2008 Best Remodel award from Golf Digest magazine.
