= O. Gordon Brewer Jr. =

American golfer and business executive (born 1936)

Personal information
- Full name: Oliver Gordon Brewer Jr.
- Nationality: United States
- Born: December 8, 1936 (age 89) Winston-Salem, North Carolina, U.S.
- Children: 2

Career
- Sport: Golf
- College: Guilford College; Dartmouth College

Oliver Gordon Brewer Jr. (born December 8, 1936) is an American amateur golfer and former business executive. In his golf career, Brewer reached the fourth round of the 1976 U.S. Amateur and was runner-up at the 1985 U.S. Mid-Amateur. He won the U.S. Senior Amateur in 1994 and 1996. He was the captain for the American team that finished in first at the 2002 Eisenhower Trophy. He held executive positions for Pine Valley Golf Club, United States Golf Association and PGA of America.

As an business executive, Brewer worked the Philadelphia National Bank during the 1960s. He then worked for Alco Standard Corporation from 1970 to the 1990s. The USGA gave Brewer an Ike Grainger Award during 2006. He was also given their 2009 Bob Jones Award.

== Early life and education ==
Brewer was born on December 8, 1936, in Winston-Salem, North Carolina. He played basketball and golf at Guilford College before he finished his studies in 1960. Brewer went to Dartmouth College for his postgraduate education during the late 1960s.

== Career ==
=== Business ===
During 1960, Brewer started his finance career with the Philadelphia National Bank. He became an assistant cashier there in 1963. Throughout the late 1960s, Brewer was assistant vice president before becoming one of their vice presidents.

He joined the Alco Standard Corporation as a treasurer in 1970. Brewer held his position leading up to the late 1980s. While there, Brewer was a vice president during the 1970s. He became their vice president of finance during 1986. His tenure continued during the 1990s.

=== Golf ===
==== Playing career ====
Brewer reached the fourth round of the 1975 North and South Amateur and 1976 U.S. Amateur. He won the 1984 Pennsylvania Amateur. He was the runner-up at the U.S. Mid-Amateur the following year. As a U.S. Senior Amateur player, Brewer won the event in 1994 and 1996. Leading up to 2002, he did not qualify at the U.S. Senior Open during his multiple attempts.

Outside of the United States, Brewer reached the fourth round of the 1974 British Amateur. He missed the cut at the 1995 British Senior Open. At the 2002 Eisenhower Trophy, he was the captain for the winning American team. Brewer was continuing his golfing experience in 2024.

==== Executive career ====
Brewer was the president of the Pennsylvania Golf Association in 1975. He briefly led the Huntingdon Valley Country Club during the 1980s. Brewer joined Pine Valley Golf Club as their president during 1998. Brewer held his position until 2010.

Brewer was selected to join the Executive Committee for the United States Golf Association during 1996. After becoming their Implements and Balls chair during 1998, Brewer held these positions until 2001. He was also on their championship committee during the late 1990s. Brewer became a director for the PGA of America in 2001. His position remained until 2003.

== Honors and personal life ==
As a member of the Golf Association of Philadelphia, Brewer was the 1997 Senior Player of the Year. He received an Arnold Palmer Lifetime Service Award in 2001 and joined their hall of fame in 2011. Following "the creation of the Brewer Cup" during 2007, the event was first played in 2008.

The United States Golf Association gave Brewer an Ike Grainger Award during 2006. This was for "25 years with the USGA as a volunteer". He was also given their 2009 Bob Jones Award. Brewer is married and has two children.
