= U.S. Amateur Four-Ball =

Golf tournament

The U.S. Amateur Four-Ball is an amateur golf tournament conducted by the United States Golf Association (USGA). It was first played in 2015 and replaced the U.S. Amateur Public Links, an individual tournament that was played from 1922 to 2014.

The U.S. Amateur Four-Ball is played by "sides" of two golfers, each with handicap indexes of 5.4 or less. 128 sides compete in a 36-hole stroke play qualifier that determines the field of 32 sides for match play. Play is conducted using a four-ball format, where the lowest score by either player on each hole is the score for the side.

The women's counterpart is the U.S. Women's Amateur Four-Ball, also started in 2015.

== Winners ==
Year	Venue	Location	Winners	Runners-up	Ref
2026	Desert Mountain Club (Cochise), (Outlaw)	Scottsdale, Arizona	(Scotland) Lawrence Allan & (United States) Grady Brame Jr.	(Wales) Jonathan Bale & (Wales) Tomi Bowen	
2025	Plainfield Country Club; Echo Lake Country Club	Edison, New Jersey; Westfield, New Jersey	(United States) Will Hartman & (United States) Tyler Mawhinney	(United States) Evan Beck & (United States) Dan Walters	
2024	Philadelphia Cricket Club (Wissahickon Course), (Militia Hill Course)	Flourtown, Pennsylvania	(United States) Brian Blanchard & (United States) Sam Engel	(United States) Blades Brown & (United States) Jackson Herrington	
2023	Kiawah Island Club (Cassique), (River)	Kiawah Island, South Carolina	(China) Aaron Du & (China) Sampson Zheng	(United States) Drew Kittleson & (United States) Drew Stoltz	
2022	Country Club of Birmingham (West Course), (East Course)	Birmingham, Alabama	(United States) Chad Wilfong & (United States) Davis Womble	(United States) Drew Kittleson & (United States) Drew Stoltz	
2021	Chambers Bay; The Home Course	University Place, Washington; DuPont, Washington	(Portugal) Kiko Francisco Coelho & (Venezuela) Leopoldo Herrera III	(Canada) Brendan Macdougall & (Canada) Sam Meek	
2020	Canceled due to the COVID-19 pandemic				
2019	Bandon Dunes Golf Resort (Old Macdonald), (Pacific Dunes)	Bandon, Oregon	(United States) Scott Harvey & (United States) Todd Mitchell	(United States) Logan Shuping & (United States) Blake Taylor	
2018	Jupiter Hills Club (Hills Course), (Village Course)	Tequesta, Florida	(United States) Garrett Barber & (United States) Cole Hammer	(United States) Chip Brooke & (United States) Marc Dull	
2017	Pinehurst Resort (Course No. 2), (Course No. 8)	Pinehurst, North Carolina	(United States) Frankie Capan & (Hong Kong) Shuai Ming Wong	(United States) Clark Collier & (United States) Kyle Hudelson	
2016	Winged Foot Golf Club (East Course), (West Course)	Mamaroneck, New York	(United States) Ben Baxter & (United States) Andrew Buchanan	(United States) Brandon Cigna & (United States) Ben Warnquist	
2015	Olympic Club (Lake Course), (Ocean Course)	San Francisco, California	(United States) Nathan Smith & (United States) Todd White	(United States) Sherrill Britt & (United States) Greg Earnhardt	

== Future sites ==
Year	Edition	Course	Location	Dates	Previous championships hosted
2027	12th	Erin Hills	Erin, Wisconsin	May 22–26	
2028	13th	Chambers Bay	University Place, Washington	May 20–24	2021
2029	14th	Metedeconk National Golf Club	Jackson, New Jersey	May 19–23	
2030	15th	Ridgewood Country Club	Paramus, New Jersey	TBD	
2037	22nd	Bandon Dunes Golf Resort	Bandon, Oregon	TBD	2019
