= Seattle Golf Club =

Coordinates: 47.738°N 122.360°W

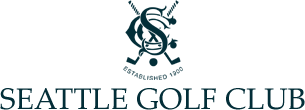

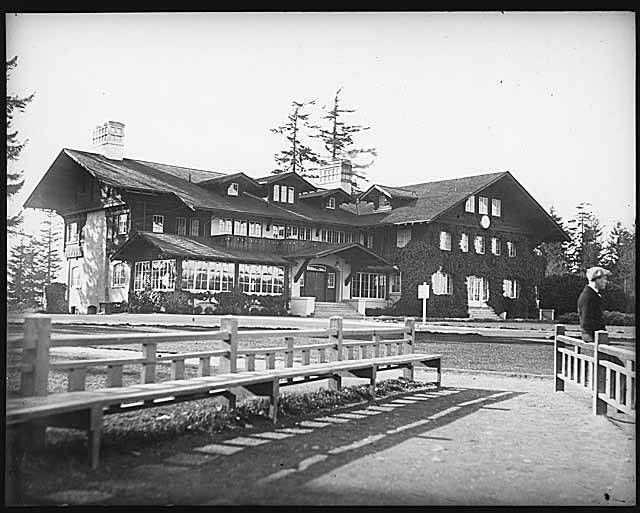
Seattle Golf Club clubhouse, 1925

The Seattle Golf Club (SGC; until November 2, 1912 Seattle Golf and Country Club or SCC) occupies about 150 acres (61 ha) in Shoreline, Washington, immediately north of Seattle. Although accounts disagree, Lou Gellos's history of the club confidently states that the 18-hole golf course was originally designed by Minneapolis-based Scottish golf course designer John Ball. It was most recently redesigned in 1996 by Arnold Palmer. The golf course and clubhouse (built in 1908, designed by Cutter & Malmgren) were developed in conjunction with The Highlands, an adjacent residential development. The club had purchased 380 acres (150 ha), and the portion not used for the course was divided into fifty parcels of land, all of which were initially sold to members of the club; those fifty parcels constitute The Highlands. Membership can be obtained only by invitation "through the sponsorship of Active members."

While the club always has been, and remains, specifically a men's club, many women also play the course. In the early years, about twenty wives of members played; they paid dues under a status of Lady Golfers. In 1975, longstanding practice was formalized and any wife of a member was welcome to join as a Lady Golfer without a separate process of application. A women's locker facility was added when the clubhouse was remodeled in the 1980s.

== History ==
At the time the club was founded in 1900, Seattle's only golf course was a 5-hole course with a tent clubhouse near present-day Gas Works Park. The Seattle Golf Club was incorporated August 8, 1900 with the intention to build a proper course. From the outset, it was an elite organization. The initial US$50 initiation fee and US$30 annual dues were among the highest in western North America at the time. The club's initial president was judge Thomas Burke. Other founders included Seattle fire chief (later state senator) Josiah Collins; former Seattle corporation counsel George Donworth; Manson F. Backus (banker, philanthropist, book and art collector); Ira Nadeau, who would later serve as director general of the Alaska-Yukon-Pacific Exposition; banker Jacob Furth; Pierre P. Ferry, whose home later became the official residence of the bishop of the Episcopal Diocese of Olympia; former Seattle mayor John Leary; businessman Horace Chapin Henry, whose art collection became the basis for the Henry Art Gallery; and a number of Seattle's other leading attorneys and businessmen.

On September 5, 1900 the Board approved a 10-year lease on a property in what is now the Laurelhurst neighborhood sufficient for a 9-hole course. In the initial years, the course doubled as pasture for landlord David Ferguson's cows and goats. At some unknown date in the next several years the club purchased the land outright. The course was designed by a Scot, John Ball, who lived in Minneapolis, with assistance from another Scot, Willie Watson, who designed several golf courses in the Pacific Northwest. A farmhouse was converted to a clubhouse; that building was later moved about a block and is still extant as a residence at 5100 NE Latimer Place.

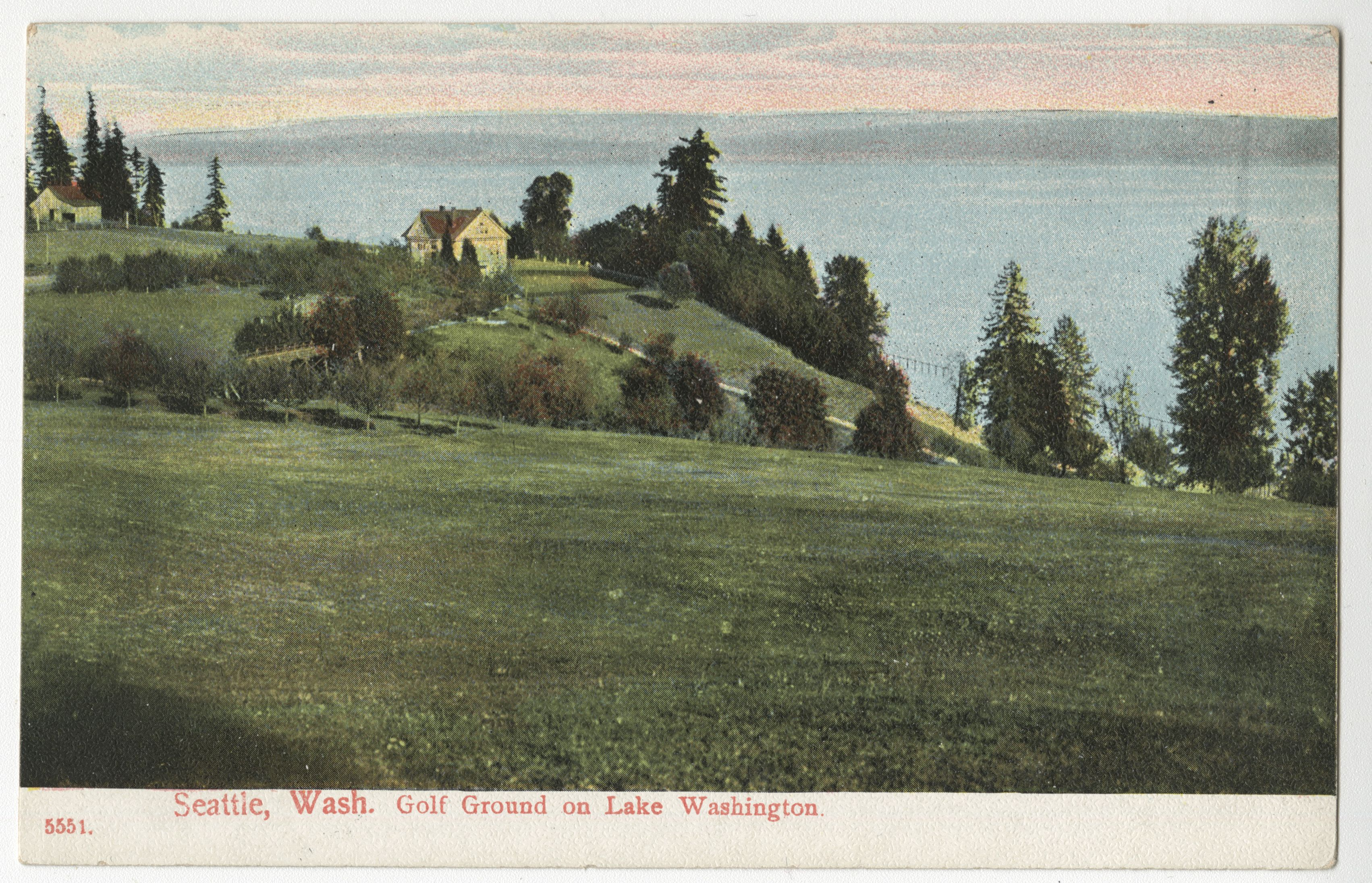
A postcard shows SGC's golf course at Laurelhurst in the 1900s. Clubhouse is left of center. To the right of that you can see the steep path down to the landing on Lake Washington.

At that time the area was known as "Yesler" (after Seattle pioneer Henry Yesler) and was outside city limits and rather remote. To reach it from Seattle, golfers took the Madison Street Cable Car to the end of the line on Lake Washington, the took a naptha-powered launch called the "Sunny Jim" to a landing near the present-day Shoreline Street End 127, where 51st Ave NE hits the west shore of Lake Washington. (The "Sunny Jim" was operated strictly for the golf club, and riders had to give a password to board.) Golfers then needed to climb up a 100-foot (30 m) ravine to the clubhouse. (There was an alternative land route, that required a long walk from the Floyd station of the Seattle-Everett Interurban.)

The six holes closest to the clubhouse (1, 2, 3, 4, 8, and 9) were completed by the time the course opened on September 6, 1901, and three more were added later. However, the club decided to move. Accounts of the reasons for this vary. Lou Gellos dismisses the claims that the space at Laurelhurst was inadequate. Thirty members of the club, organized as the Seaboard Security Company, owned a large, mostly logged-off, tract of land on the Puget Sound shore north of the city, about four miles north of Ballard. They proposed to buy the club's Yesler/Laurelhurst property for US$100,000. The rest of the transaction is a bit foggy: money from the Meadows racetrack (on the site of present-day Boeing Field) may have been involved. In any case, the club used US$40,555 of this same money to purchase the tract up north. Another US$44,000 was set aside for a clubhouse, and dues were significantly increased.

On March 21, 1907, after deciding to purchase the 360 acres (150 ha) at their current location, the Board approved the sale of the Laurelhurst property, and agreed to lease back that property while building their new facility. That location was purchased April 4, 1907, and work began once again with course designer John Ball and with Spokane-based clubhouse architects Cutter & Malmgren. The Laurelhurst lease ended June 30, 1908 and official play at the new location began June 12, 1909.

In that era, transportation to the new site in present-day Shoreline was a problem as well. This was an issue both for construction and for golfers to reach the course. For construction purposes, it appears that Joshua Green's Puget Sound Navigation Company brought materials to the nearby Puget Sound shore; these were then hauled up 550 feet (170 m) by an "overhead tram" powered by a donkey engine.

As for the golfers, although the property could be reached by dirt and plank roads that went to Richmond Beach, most people, even most wealthy people, didn't own automobiles, or considered the primitive road inadequate. It took an hour to drive the 11 miles from Downtown Seattle. That was solved when Stone & Webster agreed to build an east-west branch line off of their Seattle-Everett Interurban line to serve the new location with an electric shuttle car. By 1918, members either lived in the nearby Highlands or arrived almost entirely by automobile, and the shuttle was discontinued, as eventually was the Interurban.

Despite a 1912 fire and various alterations and renovations, the Cutter & Malmgren clubhouse remained essentially the same until the mid-1980s, but it was not always well-maintained. By 1987, it was "literally coming apart." A renovation in 1987-1988 cost nearly US$3 million, and was essentially a rebuild except for the exterior walls: they gutted the interior, rebuilt the basement shear wall, and rearranged the interior design so that an elevator could be added. Chimneys were rebuilt, steel beams were added, and for the first time the building joined the irrigation system in being connected to the city water supply rather than its own well.

== The course ==
The Seattle Golf Club course is somewhat unusual for an American golf course in that virtually no private homes (or, really, any man-made structures other than the clubhouse) are visible from any part of the course. The club is also somewhat unusual for being strictly a golf club: no tennis courts, no swimming pool, not even a billiards table.

Until 1920, only the greens were watered; the greens were hand-mowed, but the fairways were meadows, left to nature. As gasoline-powered mowers became available, the fairways began to be watered and mowed as well, and golf became more of a spring and summer game, less of a fall and winter game. Some time in the 1920s, a city water supply connection was obtained to water the course via wooden irrigation pipes, which were replaced by cast iron in 1931, and were in turn replaced again circa 1960 as the course switched over to a built-in sprinkler system.

Due in part to problems caused by maple trees planted in the course's early years, the course underwent a significant remodeling in 1968-1969. Under a design by Ted Robinson, all of the greens and most of the tee boxes were reworked. Two holes (the 8th and 12th) were completely redesigned. The project required closing the whole course for the duration, took longer than expected to be completed, and resulted in several club members resigning in anger, while others pitched in and assisted by walking the courses and picking up rocks that had surfaced during the construction. The remodel was completed May 19, 1969. The new course was "christened" by a foursome of some of the club's oldest members, including the 98-year-old Joshua Green.

A further renovation in the early 1990s by Arnold Palmer went much more smoothly. Palmer was initially brought in because there was a general consensus that the 18th hole didn't allow for enough strategic choices. Palmer redesigned that hole to make it a more reasonable gamble to try to start off with a long drive in an effort to birdie. He also ended up completely redesigning the 8th hole, and re-engineering several bodies of water He also improved the practice area and convinced the club to remove about 300 trees, including one that had stood in the middle of the 3rd-hole fairway and had made it almost impossible to approach the hole in anything like a conventional manner. The renovation also lengthened the course by some 300 yards (270 m).

The latest course update occurred in 2022, led by Thad Layton of the Arnold Palmer Design Company. This update revised the greens, fairway bunkers, and tees.

== Players and tournaments ==
U.S. President William Howard Taft, an avid golfer, played both the Laurelhurst course when he visited Seattle in 1907, and the current course when he visited as president in 1909 for the Alaska-Yukon-Pacific Exposition.

Among the tournaments held at the current course have been the 1952 U.S. Amateur, the 1961 Walker Cup, and the 1981 U.S. Senior Men's Amateur.

The course will host the US Senior Men's Amateur Championship again in 2027.
