= Bob Jones Award =

Highest award by the United States Golf Association

The Bob Jones Award is the highest honor given by the United States Golf Association in recognition of distinguished sportsmanship in golf. It is named in honor of Bobby Jones.

== Winners ==
- 1955 Francis Ouimet
- 1956 William C. Campbell
- 1957 Babe Zaharias
- 1958 Margaret Curtis
- 1959 Findlay S. Douglas
- 1960 Chick Evans
- 1961 Joe Carr
- 1962 Horton Smith
- 1963 Patty Berg
- 1964 Charles Coe
- 1965 Glenna Collett Vare
- 1966 Gary Player
- 1967 Richard Tufts
- 1968 Bob Dickson
- 1969 Gerald Micklem
- 1970 Roberto De Vicenzo
- 1971 Arnold Palmer
- 1972 Michael Bonallack
- 1973 Gene Littler
- 1974 Byron Nelson
- 1975 Jack Nicklaus
- 1976 Ben Hogan
- 1977 Joseph Dey
- 1978 Bing Crosby and Bob Hope
- 1979 Tom Kite
- 1980 Charlie Yates
- 1981 JoAnne Carner
- 1982 Billy Joe Patton
- 1983 Maureen Ruttle Garrett
- 1984 Jay Sigel
- 1985 Fuzzy Zoeller
- 1986 Jess Sweetser
- 1987 Tom Watson
- 1988 Isaac B. Grainger
- 1989 Chi-Chi Rodríguez
- 1990 Peggy Kirk Bell
- 1991 Ben Crenshaw
- 1992 Gene Sarazen
- 1993 P. J. Boatwright Jr.
- 1994 Lewis Oehmig
- 1995 Herbert Warren Wind
- 1996 Betsy Rawls
- 1997 Fred Brand Jr.
- 1998 Nancy Lopez
- 1999 Ed Updegraff
- 2000 Barbara McIntire
- 2001 Tom Cousins
- 2002 Judy Rankin
- 2003 Carol Semple Thompson
- 2004 Jack Burke Jr.
- 2005 Nick Price
- 2006 Jay Haas
- 2007 Louise Suggs
- 2008 George H. W. Bush
- 2009 O. Gordon Brewer Jr.
- 2010 Mickey Wright
- 2011 Lorena Ochoa
- 2012 Annika Sörenstam
- 2013 Davis Love III
- 2014 Payne Stewart
- 2015 Barbara Nicklaus
- 2016 Judy Bell
- 2017 Bob Ford
- 2018 Dennis Walters
- 2019 Lee Elder
- 2020 Pak Se-Ri
- 2021 Bob Lewis
- 2022 Juli Inkster
- 2023 Johnny Miller
- 2024 Tiger Woods
- 2025 Mike Keiser
- 2026 Ellen Port
