= Blaine Peffley =

American professional golfer

Blaine Peffley (born August 25, 1984 in Lebanon, Pennsylvania) is an American professional golfer who has played on the NGA Hooters Tour and the eGolf Professional Tour. He is a former Pennsylvania Amateur champion.

== Amateur career ==
Peffley attended Cedar Crest High School in Lebanon, Pennsylvania. There, he earned four letters. He was a three-year Lancaster-Lebanon League champion and two-year District III champion. In 2000, he qualified for the U.S. Junior Amateur Golf Championship. In 2001, Peffley won three national events, including the AJGA Club Corp Junior Player's Championship and the AJGA Marsh Junior Championship. That year, he was Pennsylvania high school Player of the Year, and was the top-ranked junior player in the US and an AJGA All-American. Peffley was an all-state selection in 2000 and 2001. In 2002, he won the PIAA Boys' Championship. breaking former All-American Jim Furyk's scoring record in the process.

Peffley began his college golf career at the University of Arizona and later transferred to the University of Maryland. In 2004, he won the Pennsylvania Amateur.

== Professional career ==
Peffley won twice on NGA Hooters Tour, in 2007 at the Loma Linda Classic and in 2009 at I-40 Hooters Tour Open. In 2010, he qualified for the U.S. Open through the sectional qualifier in Summit, New Jersey.

== Amateur wins ==
- 2001 AJGA Club Corp Junior Players Championship, AJGA Marsh Junior Championship
- 2001–2002 PIAA Boys' Golf Championship
- 2004 Pennsylvania Amateur

== Professional wins (2) ==
=== NGA Hooters Tour wins (2) ===
| No. | Date | Tournament | Winning score | Margin of victory | Runner-up |
|---|---|---|---|---|---|
| 1 | Jun 17, 2007 | Loma Linda Classic | −17 (66-66-69-66=267) | 3 strokes | (United States) Martin Flores |
| 2 | Mar 15, 2009 | I-40 Hooters Tour Open | −7 (72-69-68=209) | 3 strokes | (United States) Scott Stallings |
