= Lew Oehmig =

American amateur golfer

Personal information
- Full name: Lewis West Oehmig
- Born: May 11, 1916 Cincinnati, Ohio, U.S.
- Died: September 25, 2002 (aged 86) Nashville, Tennessee, U.S.
- Spouse: Mary King Oehmig
- Children: 2

Career
- Sport: Golf
- College: University of Virginia
- Status: Amateur

Achievements and awards
- Bob Jones Award: 1994

Lewis West Oehmig (pronounced EMM-ig; May 11, 1916 – September 25, 2002), was an American amateur golfer from Chattanooga, Tennessee, active in the mid-twentieth century. He is known for his longevity and success in senior-level competition. Over his career he won more than 50 golf tournaments and was inducted into multiple golf halls of fame. In Scotland, Oehmig won the International Seniors Amateur title. He captured the U.S. Senior Amateur title three times. His last victory was at age 69, making him the oldest USGA champion at that time. In Tennessee, Oehmig won eight state golf championships over five decades; the first in 1937 at age 21, and the last in 1974. He played college golf at the University of Virginia. In 1948, after military service, he had promising business opportunities and chose not to play professional golf. Once he reached the age for senior golf competitions, he became a dominant national figure in the sport. He won the Tennessee Golf Association (TGA) Senior Amateur eight times and the state Senior Amateur seven times. In 1977, he was chosen as (non-playing) captain of the U.S. Walker Cup team that defeated Great Britain and Ireland. His achievements earned him the USGA's highest honor, the Bob Jones Award (1994).

== Early life ==
Oehmig was born in Cincinnati, Ohio, on May 11, 1916; his family soon moved to Chattanooga where he remained all his life. He was the second son of William G. Oehmig Jr. and Ruth Daniel Oehmig. He had three brothers—Dan, Bill, and Von. His home was within walking distance of the Chattanooga Golf and Country Club, and his father encouraged him to take up golf. His early instruction came from Wilbur Oakes, the club's Scottish-born professional. Oakes taught the traditional golf swing for hickory-shafted clubs, but Oehmig did not like rolling his wrists as Oakes taught. He modified his swing to take the club straight back and through the ball to take advantage of the steel-shafted clubs that began replacing the hickory shafts in the 1930s.

In high school at Chattanooga's Baylor School, Oehmig played multiple sports, including football, basketball, and golf. As a seventh grader, he won the school golf championship and was team captain every year. He won the Chattanooga City Amateur golf title at age 18 (1934), and graduated from Baylor in 1935, cum laude and cum honore. He claimed his first Tennessee State Amateur title in 1937 in Memphis, and he later competed in notable matches during the late 1930s and early 1940s. Among these was a tough loss to Cary Middlecoff in the 1940 State Amateur finals at Knoxville's Holston Hills, 6 and 5. (Note: In match-play golf, this tells how decisively a player wins. If one player was six holes ahead with only five holes left to play, it would be impossible for the other player to catch up. The match is over. This would be considered a dominant victory as compared to a 2 and 1 finish.)

In his youth, Oehmig had access to a strong golf culture, observing players that included Tennessee State Amateur winners Garner Watkins, Polly Boyd, Ewing Watkins, and Darden Hampton. When state and southern amateur championships were hosted in Chattanooga, he observed prominent Memphis golfers like Emmett Spicer and Chasteen Harris.

Oehmig attended the University of Virginia, where he earned a law degree. He played varsity golf there four years and, in his fourth year, he captained the remarkable 1938 team – which boasted of having four current state amateur champions as starters. In 1938, he won medalist honors at the National Intercollegiate Championship, and finished the tournament as a semifinalist. During his college years, he occasionally played practice rounds with future World Golf Hall of Fame golfer Sam Snead at Farmington Country Club in Charlottesville, Virginia. Golf writer Chris Dorch said Oehmig always held his own against Snead. Oehmig said, "We took a few sheckles off him. Sam might deny that. I should have had his money framed".

== Wartime experience ==
Oehmig served as a naval lieutenant during World War II and was stationed aboard the aircraft carrier Intrepid, participating in combat operations in the Pacific theater, including the Battle of the Coral Sea. On April 16, 1945, off the coast of Okinawa, his ship sustained a Kamikaze attack . The enemy plane struck the center of the flight deck at a near-vertical angle, driving the engine and part of the fuselage into the ship's interior creating an inferno below. Oehmig was below decks in the "ready room" with some of the pilots. Smoke billowed in the main door which was blocked. While many were working on the main door, Oehmig found a hatch in the back, that allowed them to escape. In the incident, eight men were killed and 21 wounded.

== Personal life ==
At age 30, after coming home from the war, he met Mary King at a dinner party in 1946. He had previously known her family. They had "immediate chemistry" and were married in 1947. Her father, Henry King, owned the Fleetwood Coffee Company, and died a year or so later. The company needed help to run it. Oehmig became sales director and the new job allowed him more time to play golf. The couple had two children, West and King.

== Business career ==
After the war, Ohemig returned to Chattanooga and pursued a business career. He worked for the Coca-Cola–Thomas Company, then became sales manager and vice president at Fleetwood Coffee Company. He was president and chief executive officer of Professional Golf/First Flight for eleven years. This company manufactured golf clubs and arranged golfers such as Gary Player to endorse their products. The company was later merged into the Arnold Palmer Golf Company. Oehmig subsequently held an executive role at American National Bank. He was offered this position as more of a goodwill ambassador than a banker; he was valuable in bringing new business – the bank even encouraged him to play golf.

== Senior golf ==
In the years after the war, Oehmig was devoted to family matters and his business endeavors, and did not consistently play a national amateur schedule. According to author Chris Dorch, Oehmig would have very likely won a U.S. Amateur or played on a Walker Cup Team if he had competed in major tournaments every year. But he made up for lost time by the time he reached senior status. In the early days of the Tennessee Senior Amateur, the eligibility age was only 50. Oehmig took full advantage of this, winning five in a row from 1969 to 1973. Twice in that span, in 1970 and 1971, he also won the state amateur. With the benefit of hindsight, this shows what his game might have been in his younger decades. Possibly because of Oehmig's dominance, the TGA soon raised the minimum age for senior competition to 55 years.

The time spent until he reached this age hardened Oehmig for national and international seniors competition. Oehmig's friend Bill Campbell said, "He was a better senior than he was a younger player... he didn’t burn out... he only played when he wanted to." Oehmig subsequently played in nineteen U.S. Senior Amateurs, qualified for match play eighteen times, won a record three tournaments (1972,1976,1985) and finished runner-up (1974,1977,1979) a record three times. Oehmig's last victory' may have been the most remarkable; at sixty-nine he was the oldest winner in the tournament's history.

== Walker Cup team ==
In 1977, he was appointed non-playing captain of the United States Walker Cup team. His team defeated Great Britain and Ireland, 14.5 to 3.5, at Shinnecock Hills Golf Club in Southampton, New York. In the competition, he benched Bill Sander and Fred Ridley, both former U.S. Amateur champions. Team members and the press criticized his decision. He said, "Their games weren't up to their usual standards and I saw that." In the end, the American team soundly defeated their opponents.

== Tournament victories ==
Over the course of his amateur golf career, Oehmig won more than 50 tournaments, including:

- Eight Tennessee Golf Association (TGA) State Amateurs (1937, 1949, 1951, 1952, 1955, 1962, 1970, 1971)
- Seven Tennessee State Senior Amateurs (1969, 1970, 1971, 1972, 1973, 1982, 1983)
- Three U.S. Senior Amateurs (1972, 1976, 1985)
- Two National Righty-Lefty Championships
- One U.S. Pro-Am title
- One International Seniors Amateur Golf Society Championship
- One U.S. Seniors' Golf Association title

== Honors ==
Oehmig was inducted into multiple halls of fame in recognition of his contributions to amateur golf, including:

- Tennessee Golf Hall of Fame
- Tennessee Sports Hall of Fame
- National Senior Amateur Hall of Fame (1986)
- Southern Golf Association Hall of Fame
- Chattanooga Area Old Timers Sports Hall of Fame

In 1994, he was awarded the Bob Jones Award, the highest honor bestowed by the USGA.

== Legacy ==
Oehmig died at age 86 on September 25, 2002. Over his lifetime, he was repeatedly asked why he did not become a pro golfer. He said, "There just wasn't enough money in professional golf at that time. I was fortunate enough to do well in business early on in life." His life-long friend, golfer Ira Templeton, said, "He was always a real gentleman. I never saw him display his temper. He's an unusual person, really. There's nothing you can say really bad about him." Jeff Boehm, historian at Chattanooga Golf and Country Club: "He had a gentlemanly way about him that you rarely associate with an athlete". Sportswriter Tom King: "Lew Oehmig is the most unpretenious soul who ever crossed my path."
