= Birmingham Country Club (Alabama) =

Country club in Birmingham, Alabama

Coordinates: 33.4957556°N 86.765519°W

The Country Club of Birmingham
- Interactive map of The Country Club of Birmingham

Club information
- Location: Mountain Brook, Alabama, U.S.
- Established: 1898
- Type: Private
- Total holes: 36
- Tournaments: U.S. Mid-Amateur (2013); U.S. Amateur Four-Ball (2024)
- Greens: Bent
- Fairways: Bermuda

East Course
- Designed by: Donald Ross (1927)
- Par: 70
- Length: 6,644 yards
- Course rating: 73.1
- Slope rating: 132

West Course
- Designed by: Donald Ross (1929); Robert Trent Jones (1959); Pete Dye (1986)
- Par: 71
- Length: 7,226 yards
- Course rating: 75.4
- Slope rating: 146

The Country Club of Birmingham, previously known as Birmingham Country Club, located in Birmingham, Alabama, United States, was founded in 1898. It moved in 1900 from North Birmingham to Lakeview, then again in 1926 to a site in Shades Valley, now within the city of Mountain Brook. The Lakeview club hosted former president Theodore Roosevelt and several Women's Southern Golf Association tournaments. The present site features two 18-hole courses designed in the 1920s by Donald Ross.
