= Siasconset Golf Club =

Golf course in Siasconset, Massachusetts

Siasconset Golf Course
- Location within Massachusetts
- 41°15′44″N 69°59′52″W

Club information
- Location: Siasconset, Massachusetts, U.S.
- Established: 1894
- Type: Public
- Owner: Nantucket Land Bank (2012-present); The Coffin Family (1894-2012)
- Operator: Alan Costa
- Total holes: 9
- Tournaments: The Skinner Open (annual from 1977 to 2011)
- Website: www.miacometgolf.com/sconset-golf
- Designed by: John Grout and Alex Findlay
- Par: 35

Siasconset Golf Club, also known as the Siasconset Golf Course and commonly shortened to the Sconset Golf Course, is one of the easternmost golf courses in Massachusetts, perched on the eastern edge of Nantucket Island in Siasconset, Massachusetts. This is the oldest golf course still active on Nantucket and one of the oldest golf courses in America. It once was considered the oldest privately owned golf course in the country still open to the public but, as of 1 May 2012, it is no longer privately owned. It is still known by island locals as "Skinner's Golf Club", or "Skinner's", because Robert "Skinner" Coffin was a co-owner and the superintendent of the course for many years and use to host a recreational golf tournament, known as "The Skinner Open", which was held during the years 1977 to 2011. It is currently operating as a public 9-hole course. This course was also listed in Links Magazine's article titled "The Top 10 Old Courses You Can Play". On 24 October 2019, this course was named the New England Golf Course Owners Association's "Golf Course of New England" for 2020.

== History ==
Tourism was responsible for the creation of the island's golf courses as Nantucket catered more to this sport at the end of the 19th century. In 1894, John Grout leased property near Siasconset from owner Levi Starbuck Coffin to develop this course on the land which was the old Bloomingdale Farm. The current course's clubhouse is the old farmhouse. This course was designed by John Grout and Alex Findlay.

In 1917, Mike Brady set the United States record for scoring two holes in one in an 18-hole match which was a record held until 1949.

This course thrived until 1922 which was when the Sankaty Head Golf Club was established and became its competition. After this, many golfers started playing at Sankaty Head Golf Club instead. Due to this competition, this course was abandoned by the Coffin family for many years until. In 1930, Henry Coffin Jr., at age 16, took over running it. The course had numerous changes over its history. The original square greens were changed to the well-known round greens. Even the amount of holes changed from 9-holes to 18-holes and then back to 9-holes before World War II. Henry Coffin Jr. was the golf superintendent of this course until he died in June 1994.

In 1994, after Henry Coffin Jr.'s death, Robert Coffin became the course's new superintendent. Robert Coffin was already working with his father on the course before his death. The then Coffin estate, comprising 460 acres, was passed down to his four children: Robert ("Skinner"), Henry ("Hank") III, Stephanie, and Mitchell Coffin.

In 1995, the four children were forced to sell off 250 acres to pay inheritance taxes to keep the golf course property. The Nantucket Golf Club, Inc. purchased the 250 acres for $8.25 million and, in 1998, their new 18-hole private course opened. The land they purchased included the second and third holes of the original Siaconset Golf Course, so these holes needed to be redesigned. Now the second hole is a 480-yard stretch with a dog-leg right hook and the third hole is a par 3 tight 217 yard stretch with a sloping fairway.

Also in 1995, the Nantucket Golf Club, Inc. leased the Siasconset Golf Course from the Coffin family for a 10-year period. Robert Coffin was the superintendent of the course throughout the lease and maintained the course independently. The Coffin family chose not to renew the lease when the course fell into disrepair toward the end of the lease period.

In 2005, Robert Coffin retired as the course's superintendent and was succeeded by his brother and fellow co-owner Henry Coffin III who came out of retirement to be the course's next superintendent. Henry Coffin III previously had worked at Sankaty Head Golf Club as their course superintendent for 22 years. Robert Coffin remained the bookkeeper of the club.

In 2012, Henry Coffin III retired as the course's superintendent as it was then acquired on 1 May 2012 by a joint effort of The Nantucket Island Land Bank and The 'Sconset Trust. This was when this course ceased to be privately owned.

Shortly thereafter, on 19 July 2012, which is 118 years after the course's creation, the course had its first website www.siasconsetgolf.com, which expired on 10 November 2015. Currently this course is managed by Nantucket Golf Management (NGM) Inc, which is the same management team running the Miacomet Golf Course; one of the other golf courses on Nantucket. The current general manager is Alan Costa. The current superintendent is Sean Oberly.

On 24 October 2019, the Siasconset Golf Course was named the New England Golf Course Owners Association's "Golf Course of New England" for 2020. The course was also chosen as one of four nominees for the National Golf Course Owners Association's 2020 Best Course in the U.S.

On 28 May 2021, which is 127 years after this course's creation, the course will be finally requiring tee times in order to play golf. The lack of a tee time requirement was unique to this course throughout its history.

== Course Information ==
=== Course Statistics ===
- White (Men's) Tees: 2472 yards - 30.0 rating - 98 slope.
- White (Women's) Tees: 2472 yards - 30.5 rating - 100 slope.

=== Scorecard ===
Siasconset Golf Club (All measurements made in yards)
Tee	Rating/Slope	1	2	3	4	5	6	7	8	9	Out	10	11	12	13	14	15	16	17	18	In	Total
White	M: 30.0 / 98 W: 30.5 / 100	200	480	217	400	140	245	215	310	265	2472	-	-	-	-	-	-	-	-	-	-	2472
Par		3	5	3	4	3	4	3	4	4	33	-	-	-	-	-	-	-	-	-	-	33
SI		4	5	3	1	7	8	2	6	9		-	-	-	-	-	-	-	-	-

== See also ==
- Sankaty Head Golf Club
- Miacomet Golf Course
