= Golf at the 2026 Asian Games – Men's team =

Golf – Men's team at the 2026 Asian Games
- Venue: Kasugai Country Club
- Date: 30 September 2026 – 3 October 2026
- Competitors: 62 from 21 nations

Medalists
gold medal	China; Ding Wenyi, Jin Zihao; Zheng Yunhe
silver medal	South Korea; Kim Seong-hyeon, Kim Joo-hyung; Mun Do-yeob
bronze medal	Japan; Kazuki Higa, Taishi Moto; Keita Nakajima

The men's team competition at the 2026 Asian Games in Nagoya and Aichi, Japan was held from 30 September to 3 October 2026 at the Kasugai Country Club.

== Schedule ==
All times are Japan Standard Time (UTC+09:00)

Date	Time	Event
Wednesday, 30 September 2026	06:30	Round 1
Thursday, 1 October 2026	10:40	Round 2
Friday, 2 October 2026	06:30	Round 3
Saturday, 3 October 2026	08:15	Round 4

== Results ==
Rank	Team	Round				Total	To par
Rank	Team	1	2	3	4	Total	To par
1st place, gold medalist(s)	China (CHN)	133	132	137	130	532	−28
	Ding Wenyi	67	64	~~70~~	64		
	Jin Zihao	~~70~~	68	68	66		
	Zheng Yunhe	66	68	69	~~73~~		
2nd place, silver medalist(s)	South Korea (KOR)	133	133	134	134	534	−26
	Kim Joo-hyung	67	66	65	64		
	Mun Do-yeob	66	67	69	70		
	Kim Seong-hyeon	~~68~~	~~71~~	69	~~73~~		
3rd place, bronze medalist(s)	Japan (JPN)	131	133	137	136	537	−23
	Kazuki Higa	65	67	67	66		
	Taishi Moto	~~74~~	~~68~~	~~72~~	70		
	Keita Nakajima	66	66	70	~~71~~		
T4	Chinese Taipei (TPE)	136	133	133	136	538	−22
	Hung Chien-yao	~~72~~	~~69~~	~~70~~	67		
	Chan Shih-chang	71	67	65	69		
	Wang Wei-hsuan	65	66	68	~~70~~		
T4	Thailand (THA)	142	136	130	130	538	−22
	Sadom Kaewkanjana	70	69	63	63		
	Pongsapak Laopakdee	72	67	~~73~~	67		
	Poom Saksansin	~~74~~	69	67	~~71~~		
6	India (IND)	137	136	136	133	542	−18
	Saptak Talwar	66	68	71	66		
	Veer Ahlawat	71	68	65	67		
	Yuvraj Sandhu	71>	~~69~~	71	~~70~~		
7	Hong Kong (HKG)	137	138	139	131	545	−15
	Hak Shunyat	~~73~~	68	~~73~~	65		
	Matthew Cheung	68	70	70	66		
	Kho Taichi	69	70	69	~~71~~		
8	Singapore (SGP)	142	143	136	131	552	−8
	Hiroshi Tai	70	70	69	64		
	James Leow	72	73	67	67		
	Nicklaus Chiam	~~75~~	~~75~~	~~70~~	~~68~~		
9	Philippines (PHI)	137	137	142	137	553	−7
	Carl Jano Corpus	69	~~72~~	~~77~~	66		
	Justin de los Santos	68	67	71	71		
	Miguel Tabuena	~~70~~	70	71	71		
10	Indonesia (INA)	139	137	142	136	554	−6
	Randy Arbenata Bintang	~~73~~	~~76~~	~~74~~	67		
	Jonathan Wijono	68	68	72	69		
	Naraajie Ramadhan Putra	71	69	70	~~72~~		
11	Vietnam (VIE)	140	141	141	135	557	−3
	Lê Khánh Hưng	~~77~~	70	74	66		
	Nguyễn Anh Minh	71	71	67	69		
	Nguyễn Tuấn Anh	69	~~74~~	~~75~~	~~75~~		
12	Bangladesh (BAN)	140	137	147	139	563	+3
	Siddikur Rahman	69	~~71~~	73	69		
	Badal Hossain	71	68	~~76~~	70		
	Jamal Hossain	~~75~~	69	74	~~75~~		
CUT	Macau (MAC)	144	142			286	+6
	Si Ngai	69	69				
	Lei Kun Wang	75	73				
	Hun Pui In	~~77~~	~~79~~				
CUT	Nepal (NEP)	146	143			289	+9
	Sadbhav Acharya	WD	WD				
	Subash Tamang	70	67				
	Rahul Bishwakarma	76	76				
CUT	Sri Lanka (SRI)	147	145			292	+12
	Mithun Chamika	74	70				
	Thangaraja Nadaraja	73	75				
	Dhanushan Kanas Kumar	~~80~~	75				
CUT	Qatar (QAT)	148	149			297	+17
	Daniil Sokolov	72	73				
	Saleh Ali Alkaabi	76	76				
	Ali Al-Shahrani	76	~~82~~				
CUT	Uzbekistan (UZB)	149	148			297	+17
	Kanatbek Kurbanaliev	76	71				
	Akbarjon Inoyatov	76	77				
	Sergey Chen	73	~~84~~				
CUT	United Arab Emirates (UAE)	152	147			299	+19
	Sam Mullane	76	69				
	Jonathan Selvaraj	76	78				
	Syed Rayan Ahmed	~~79~~	~~82~~				
CUT	Palestine (PLE)	169	155			324	+44
	Joseph Easmeil	84	76				
	Heneri Ismail	~~95~~	79				
	Amro Alhouseini	85	~~89~~				
CUT	Kazakhstan (KAZ)	172	156			328	+48
	Akhmetzhan Tagashev	87	75				
	Marat Bagtzhanov	85	81				
CUT	Mongolia (MGL)	174	176			350	+70
	Solongobat Otgonbaatar	81	88				
	Anarbat Jargalsaikhan	~~96~~	88				
	Javkhlan Boldbaatar	93	~~93~~				
