= Sampson Zheng =

Chinese professional golfer (born 2001)

Personal information
- Full name: Zheng Sampson-Yunhe
- Nationality: China
- Born: 16 July 2001 (age 25) Tianjin, China
- Height: 6 ft 0 in (183 cm)
- Weight: 210 lb (95 kg)

Career
- Sport: Golf
- College: University of California, Berkeley
- Turned professional: 2024
- Current tour: Asian Tour

Best results in major championships
- Masters Tournament: DNP
- PGA Championship: DNP
- U.S. Open: DNP
- The Open Championship: CUT: 2025

Achievements and awards
- Cal Golf Most Valuable Player: 2023, 2024
Medal record
Men's golf
Representing China
Asian Games
Gold medal – first place	2026 Aichi–Nagoya	Men's team

Zheng Sampson-Yunhe (born 16 July 2001), commonly known as Sampson Zheng, is a Chinese professional golfer. He plays on the Asian Tour, where he was runner-up at the 2024 Indonesia Open. He won the 2023 U.S. Amateur Four-Ball.

== Early life and amateur career ==
Zheng was born in Tianjin, China and picked up a golf club for the first time when he was nine. He grew up in Japan, and attended high school in Florida.

Zheng attended the University of California, Berkeley between 2020 and 2024. Playing with the California Golden Bears men's golf team he was named All-American and Cal Golf Most Valuable Player his junior and senior years.

In 2023, Zheng shot a 65 in third round, an amateur course record, at the Asia-Pacific Amateur Championship at Royal Melbourne Golf Club, to finish runner-up after he lost a playoff to Australian Jasper Stubbs. He won the U.S. Amateur Four-Ball Championship alongside Aaron Du at Kiawah Island Club.

== Professional career ==
Zheng turned professional mid-way through 2024 and joined the Asian Tour. He tied for 4th in the International Series England and was the halfway leader at the Indonesia Open, ultimately losing in a play-off.

In 2025, Zheng was in contention in the International Series Philippines, ultimately finishing tied 4th.

Zheng made his major debut at the 2025 Open Championship at Royal Portrush Golf Club, having finished second in Final Qualifying at West Lancashire with rounds of 68 and 69.

== Amateur wins ==
- 2018 Daniel Berger Junior Championship
- 2020 Florida Collegiate Invitational
- 2023 John Burns Intercollegiate, U.S. Amateur Four-Ball (with Aaron Du)

== Playoff record ==
Asian Tour playoff record (0–1)

No.	Year	Tournament	Opponents	Result
1	2024	Mandiri Indonesia Open	(England) Steve Lewton, (Australia) Aaron Wilkin	Lewton won with birdie on second extra hole

== Results in major championships ==
Tournament	2025
Masters Tournament	
PGA Championship	
U.S. Open	
The Open Championship	CUT

Did not play

CUT = missed the half way cut

== Team appearances ==
- Arnold Palmer Cup (representing the International team): 2023
- Bonallack Trophy (representing Asia-Pacific): 2023
