= Tennessee Open =

Golf tournament

The Tennessee Open is the Tennessee state open golf tournament, open to both amateur and professional golfers. It is organized by the Tennessee Golf Association. It has been played annually since 1949 at a variety of courses around the state.

== Winners ==
- 2026 Adam Forgey
- 2025 Harrison Ott
- 2024 Jackson Herrington (a)
- 2023 Hunter Wolcott
- 2022 Brad Hawkins
- 2021 Nolan Ray
- 2020 No tournament due to COVID-19 pandemic
- 2019 Hunter Green
- 2018 Joey Savoie (a)
- 2017 Jonathan Hodge
- 2016 Jason Millard
- 2015 Garrett Willis
- 2014 Steven Fox
- 2013 Garrett Willis
- 2012 Craig Smith (a)
- 2011 Jonathan Fly (a)
- 2010 Grant Leaver
- 2009 Bryce Ledford
- 2008 Codie Hale (a)
- 2007 Derek Rende (a)
- 2006 Justin Metzger
- 2005 Andrew Pratt
- 2004 Andrew Pratt (a)
- 2003 Rob Long (a)
- 2002 Tim Jackson (a)
- 2001 Trey Lewis (a)
- 2000 Garrett Willis
- 1999 Loren Roberts
- 1998 Richard Smith (a)
- 1997 Kip Henley
- 1996 Walt Chapman
- 1995 Jared Melson
- 1994 Chuck Jabaley (a)
- 1993 Jimmy Ellis
- 1992 Bobby Nichols
- 1991 Steve Munson
- 1990 Gibby Gilbert
- 1989 Gibby Gilbert
- 1988 Gibby Gilbert
- 1987 Rob Long (a)
- 1986 Gibby Gilbert
- 1985 Mike Nelms
- 1984 Gary Robinson
- 1983 Bob Wolcott (a)
- 1982 Kip Henley (a)
- 1981 Mike Nelms
- 1980 Bill Argabrite (a)
- 1979 Jimmy Paschal
- 1978 Sam Young (a)
- 1977 Richard Eller
- 1976 Larry White
- 1975 Greg Powers
- 1974 Bobby Bray
- 1973 Joe Campbell
- 1972 Mason Rudolph
- 1971 Richard Eller
- 1970 Larry Gilbert
- 1969 Harold Lane (a)
- 1968 Bobby Greenwood (a)
- 1967 John Deal (a)
- 1966 Mason Rudolph
- 1965 Joe Campbell
- 1964 Mason Rudolph
- 1963 Mason Rudolph
- 1962 Pat Abbott
- 1961 J. C. Goosie
- 1960 J. C. Goosie
- 1959 Mason Rudolph
- 1958 Joe Campbell
- 1957 Curtis Person, Sr. (a)
- 1956 Mason Rudolph (a)
- 1955 Pat Abbott
- 1954 Pat Abbott
- 1953 Curtis Person, Sr. (a)
- 1952 Albert Stone, Jr. (a)
- 1951 Ira Templeton (a)
- 1950 Johnny Morris
- 1949 Pat Abbott

Earlier events

- 1921 Frank Sprogell

a = amateur
