= Pat Abbott =

American professional golfer (1912–1984)

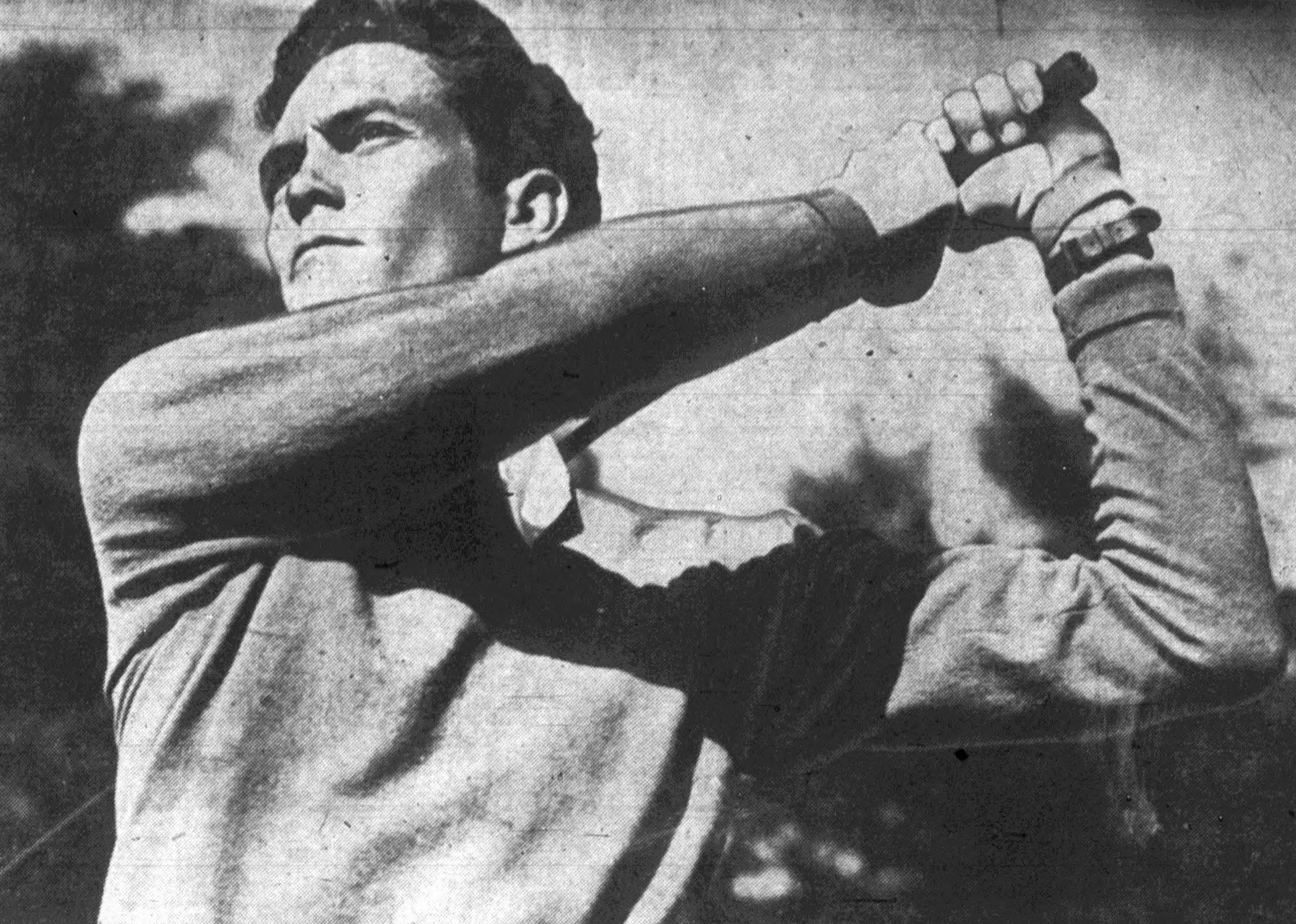
Abbott, circa 1941

Buell Patrick Abbott (January 18, 1912 – May 13, 1984) was an American professional golfer.

== Early life ==
Abbott was born in Pasadena, California.

== Amateur career ==
In 1936, Abbott won the U.S. Amateur Public Links, beating Claude Rippy 4 & 3. In 1938, he lost the U.S. Amateur to Willie Turnesa 8 & 7. He would lose the U.S. Amateur again in 1941 to Bud Ward 4 & 3. He won the 1942 Western Amateur as well as the Southern California Amateur, twice, and the Southern California Open in 1935.

== Professional career ==
Abbott turned professional after World War II and served as a club pro at Memphis Country Club in Memphis, Tennessee for 34 years. He won the Tennessee Open four times and the Tennessee PGA Senior Championship three times.

== Awards and honors ==
In 2002, Abbott was inducted into the Tennessee Golf Hall of Fame.

== Later life and death ==
Abbott and his wife Charlotte both worked as amateur actors for many years at Theatre Memphis, and both served as board members of that community theatre. He died in Memphis, Tennessee on May 13, 1984 at the age of 72.

== Amateur wins ==
- 1936 U.S. Amateur Public Links
- 1938 Southern California Amateur
- 1941 Southern California Amateur
- 1942 Western Amateur

== Professional wins (8) ==
- 1935 Southern California Open (as an amateur)
- 1949 Tennessee Open
- 1954 Tennessee Open
- 1955 Tennessee Open
- 1962 Tennessee Open
- 1969 Tennessee PGA Senior Championship
- 1971 Tennessee PGA Senior Championship
- 1974 Tennessee PGA Senior Championship
