= Sunnehanna Amateur =

Golf tournament

Tournament information
- Location: Johnstown, Pennsylvania, U.S.
- Established: 1954
- Course: Sunnehanna Country Club
- Par: 70
- Format: Stroke play
- Month played: June

Tournament record score
- Aggregate: 266 Allen Doyle (1992)

Current champion
- Grant Roscich

The Sunnehanna Amateur, officially the Sunnehanna Amateur Tournament for Champions, is a men's amateur golf tournament. Founded in 1954, it is hosted annually at the Sunnehanna Country Club in Johnstown, Pennsylvania, United States. It is considered to be one of the top amateur golf tournaments held in the United States and is classified as a Category A event by the World Amateur Golf Rankings.

The Sunnehanna Amateur is played in stroke play format; 72 holes (four rounds) held over four days. Many current and former PGA Tour, Champions Tour, Walker Cup and Ryder Cup players have competed in the tournament. Tiger Woods played in the tournament twice, finishing 5th in 1992 and tied for 12th in 1993.

In December 2021, the Sunnehanna Amateur joined with six other tournaments to form the Elite Amateur Golf Series.

== Winners ==
- 2026 Grant Roscich
- 2025 Tyler Watts
- 2024 Ben Warian
- 2023 Jackson Van Paris
- 2022 Bryce Lewis
- 2021 Trent Phillips
- 2020 Preston Summerhays
- 2019 Alex Smalley
- 2018 Alex Smalley
- 2017 Braden Thornberry
- 2016 Collin Morikawa
- 2015 Derek Bard
- 2014 Will Murphy
- 2013 Steven Ihm
- 2012 Bobby Wyatt
- 2011 Nathan Smith
- 2010 Bobby Hudson
- 2009 Kevin Foley
- 2008 Rickie Fowler
- 2007 Rickie Fowler
- 2006 Webb Simpson
- 2005 Michael Sim
- 2004 Jack Ferguson
- 2003 Matt Hendrix
- 2002 Dillard Pruitt
- 2001 Lucas Glover
- 2000 Edward Loar
- 1999 Edward Loar
- 1998 Steve Sheehan
- 1997 Duke Delcher
- 1996 Jeff Thomas
- 1995 John Harris
- 1994 Allen Doyle
- 1993 Jaxon Brigman
- 1992 Allen Doyle
- 1991 Paul Claxton
- 1990 Allen Doyle
- 1989 Allen Doyle
- 1988 Jay Sigel
- 1987 Greg Lesher
- 1986 Billy Andrade
- 1985 Scott Verplank
- 1984 Scott Verplank
- 1983 Dillard Pruitt
- 1982 Brad Faxon
- 1981 Jodie Mudd
- 1980 Bobby Clampett
- 1979 John Cook
- 1978 Jay Sigel
- 1977 John Cook
- 1976 Jay Sigel
- 1975 Jaime Gonzalez
- 1974 Dave Strawn
- 1973 Ben Crenshaw
- 1972 Mark Hayes
- 1971 Bob Zender
- 1970 Howard Twitty
- 1969 Leonard Thompson
- 1968 Bobby Greenwood
- 1967 Bill Hyndman
- 1966 Jack Lewis Jr.
- 1965 Bobby Greenwood
- 1964 Gary Cowan
- 1963 Roger McManus
- 1962 Ed Updegraff
- 1961 Dick Siderowf
- 1960 Gene Dahlbender
- 1959 Tommy Aaron
- 1958 Bill Hyndman
- 1957 Joe Campbell
- 1956 Gene Dahlbender
- 1955 Hillman Robbins
- 1954 Don Cherry
