= Sankaty Head Golf Club =

Golf course in Siasconset, Massachusetts

- Location within Massachusetts
- 41°16′40″N 69°58′08″W

Club information
- Location: Siasconset, Massachusetts, USA
- Established: 1921
- Type: Private
- Operator: Lori Snell
- Tota holes: 18
- Website: www.sankatyheadgc.com

Sankaty Head Golf Club is one of the easternmost golf courses in Massachusetts, perched on the edge of Nantucket Island in Siasconset, Massachusetts. The course was designed by Emerson Armstrong and opened in 1921. It is an 18-hole course. It is one of the few examples of world-class links-style golf outside of the UK (see Shinnecock Hills). The Atlantic wraps around 270 degrees of the layout and the Sankaty Head Lighthouse looms over the front nine.

Sankaty members are a driving force behind the Francis Ouimet Scholarship Fund. They also have successfully sustained one of the few remaining caddy camps in the world, Camp Sankaty Head, which has existed since the late 1930s. Membership is private. Famous members include Jack Welch (whose island residence is just off the 4th tee-box), Lawrence Bossidy, Robert Charles Wright, Harry Fraker, Amos Hostetter Jr., Henry C. Pfaff, and Bill Belichick.

On June 4, 2019, the Sankaty Head Golf Club was chosen to be the host site of the USGA's 41st U.S. Mid-Amateur. This was their first hosted USGA championship and was played September 25–30, 2021.

== The Caddy Camp ==
The Sankaty Head Caddy Camp, directed by Dave Hinman, is the last remaining caddy camp in the United States and one of the last in the world. Here, 60 caddies, 6 junior staff members, a program director, caddymaster, camp director, assistant camp director, and cook are located between the 11th and 13th fairways on the course. After being picked through an application process, caddies come to this camp from Iowa, Florida, New York, South Carolina, Maine, New Jersey and other states.

There are three "huts" in the camp, with 20 boys in each. Other buildings in camp include a mess hall, recreational hall, library, laundry shack, staff hut, and the director's hut. While the boys are not caddying, they can enjoy organized team sports of softball, volleyball, football, basketball, and of course, golf. Also in their free time, the boys can enjoy recreational golf, a workout in the weight "pit", or a game of ping pong in the rec hall.

On August 2, 2011, a fire at the caddy camp erupted during a propane delivery. The fire consumed three buildings and injured the driver of the propane tanker truck.

=== Scorecard ===
Sankaty Head Golf Club (All measurements made in yards)
Tee	Rating/Slope	1	2	3	4	5	6	7	8	9	Out	10	11	12	13	14	15	16	17	18	In	Total
Black	72.6 / 126	405	375	195	495	420	180	410	540	285	3305	425	450	225	380	150	410	350	545	385	3320	6625
White	70.8 / 123	390	355	185	485	410	160	390	520	280	3175	405	400	190	370	135	385	340	495	375	3095	6270
Blue	M:67.2/118 W:72.5/119	350	295	180	410	360	130	350	420	280	2775	360	350	175	325	110	365	330	450	340	2805	5580
Yellow	M:65.7/111 W:70.7/115	315	290	145	400	360	110	350	415	260	2645	330	350	160	320	105	325	315	410	310	2625	5270
Par	Men's and Women's	4	4	3	5	4	3	4	5	4	36	4	4	3	4	3	4	4	5	4	35	71
SI	Men's	11	9	15	5	3	17	7	1	13		4	6	15	10	18	8	12	2	14
SI	Women's	5	13	15	11	1	17	7	3	9		10	8	18	12	14	2	16	4	6

== See also ==
- Siasconset Golf Club
- Miacomet Golf Course
