= Dennis Walters (golfer) =

American trick-shot golfer (born 1949)

Personal information
- Nationality: United States
- Born: September 14, 1949 (age 77) Neptune Township, New Jersey, U.S.

Career
- Sport: Golf
- College: North Texas State
- Turned professional: 1971

Achievements and awards
- World Golf Hall of Fame: 2019 (member page)
- Bob Jones Award: 2018

Dennis Walters (born September 14, 1949) is an American trick-shot golfer. He won the Bob Jones Award in 2018 and was inducted into the World Golf Hall of Fame with the class of 2019.

== Early life and education ==
In 1949, Walters was born and raised in Neptune Township, New Jersey, where he attended Neptune High School. Before starting his golf career, Walters played Little League softball and bowling during his childhood. For his post-secondary education, Walters went to North Texas State on a golf scholarship. At North Texas, he captained the winning team of the Missouri Valley Conference four years in a row.

== Career ==
In 1967, Walters won the New Jersey Junior Championship, Public Links Junior Championship, and Caddie Championship. At the time, Walters was the first golfer to win all three New Jersey amateur tournaments. In 1971, he participated at the U.S. Amateur and came in eleventh place.

Walters began his professional career in 1971 after graduating from North Texas. After failing to earn a Tour card at the PGA Tour Qualifying Tournament in 1972, Walters began golfing on the South African Tour. In July 1974, Walters had finished playing on the South African Tour before becoming paralyzed in a golf cart accident. At the time of his accident, Walters was working at the Wykagyl Country Club.

As a wheelchair golfer, Walters continued to play golf in 1975 and had a customized golf cart made for him. Walters decided to perform wheelchair trick shots after he was inspired by golfers Paul Hahn Jr. and Joe Kirkwood Sr. His first event was at the 1977 PGA Merchandise Show and he appeared in a 1979 episode of That's Incredible!.

Walters currently lives in Jupiter, Florida.

== Awards ==
In 2018, Walters was given the Bob Jones Award by the United States Golf Association. He was inducted into the World Golf Hall of Fame for the class of 2019 alongside Retief Goosen, Billy Payne, Jan Stephenson and Peggy Kirk Bell. The induction ceremony was held near Pebble Beach, California at the Sunset Center, kicking off the men's U.S. Open.

== Personal life ==
In 2013, Walters broke his tibia during an accident while going out for groceries.
