= Jackson Herrington =

American amateur golfer (born c. 2007)

Personal information
- Nationality: United States
- Born: c. 2007 Nashville, Tennessee, U.S.
- Height: 6 ft 0 in (183 cm)

Career
- Sport: Golf
- College: University of Tennessee
- Status: Amateur

Best results in major championships
- Masters Tournament: CUT: 2026
- PGA Championship: DNP
- U.S. Open: CUT: 2026
- The Open Championship: DNP

Jackson Herrington (born c. 2007) is an American amateur golfer. He attends the University of Tennessee. He appeared in his first major at the 2026 Masters Tournament.

In May 2024, Herrington, teamed with Blades Brown, finished runner-up at the U.S. Amateur Four-Ball. Also in 2024, he won the Tennessee Open.

In August 2025, he finished runner-up to Mason Howell in the U.S. Amateur at the Olympic Club in California.

== Professional wins ==
- 2024 Tennessee Open (as an amateur)

== Results in major championships ==
Tournament	2026
Masters Tournament	CUT
PGA Championship	
U.S. Open	CUT
The Open Championship	

Did not play

CUT = missed the halfway cut
