= Kinloch Golf Club =

Golf club in Virginia, US

Coordinates: 37°38′9″N 77°41′15″W

- Interactive map of Kinloch Golf Club

Club information
- Established: 2001
- Type: Private
- Website: https://kinlochgolfclub.com

Kinloch Golf Club logo

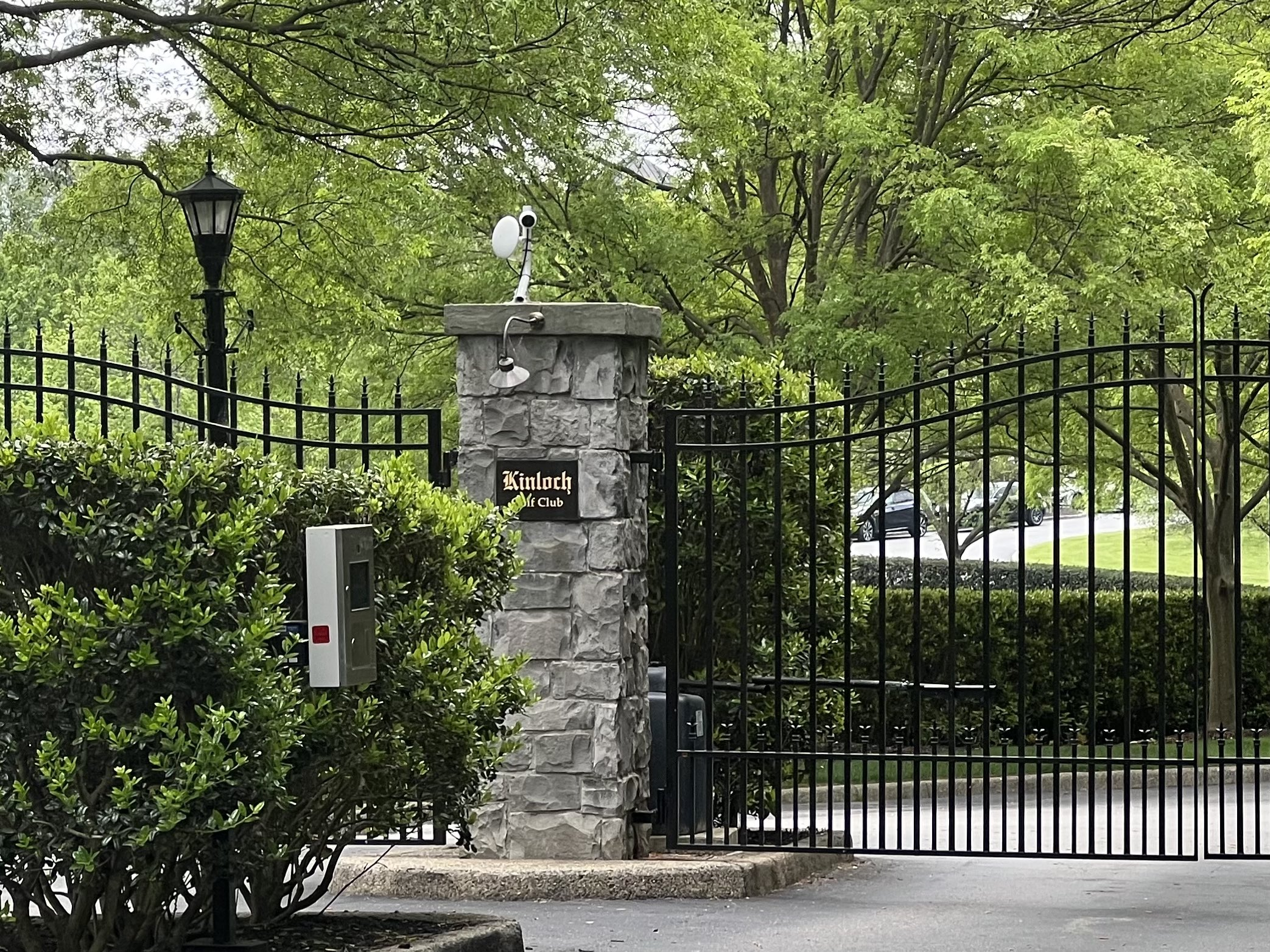
Kinloch Golf Club entrance gate.

Kinloch Golf Club is a golf club in Manakin-Sabot, Virginia. The club was selected as Golf Digest's "Best New Course" in 2001, the year it opened, and has been on numerous "best of" lists in its existence.

Kinloch is a private golf club with a business model that differs from most private clubs. Resident, non-resident, and national memberships are available on a single-member basis (meaning members of a family must all have individual memberships).

The golf course was designed by golf course architect Lester George and U.S. Amateur Champion, Marvin "Vinny" Giles.

The practice facility at Kinloch has been used as an example of the golf industry's changing approach to teaching and practice.

Kinloch Golf Club hosted the 2011 U.S. Senior Amateur and the 2024 U.S. Mid-Amateur.

In 2025, Kinloch was ranked #1 in the state by Golf Digest.
