= Nathan Smith (golfer) =

American amateur golfer (born 1978)

Personal information
- Full name: Nathan T. Smith
- Nationality: United States
- Born: August 16, 1978 (age 48) Brookville, Pennsylvania
- Height: 6 ft 1 in (1.85 m)
- Weight: 160 lb (73 kg; 11 st)

Career
- Sport: Golf
- College: Allegheny College
- Status: Amateur

Best results in major championships
- Masters Tournament: CUT: 2004, 2010, 2011, 2013
- PGA Championship: DNP
- U.S. Open: CUT: 2004
- The Open Championship: DNP

Nathan T. Smith (born August 16, 1978) is an American amateur golfer.

== Golf career ==
Smith won the U.S. Mid-Amateur four times (2003, 2009, 2010, 2012), the Sunnehanna Amateur (2011), the Pennsylvania Amateur twice (2002, 2009), the West Penn Amateur four times (2007–10), and the R. Jay Sigel Match Play three times (2011, 2013, 2015). He also won the inaugural U.S. Amateur Four-Ball, with Todd White, in 2015.

Smith played in three consecutive Walker Cups (2009, 2011, 2013). He captained the 2025 Walker Cup.

Smith has played in five major championships (four Masters and one U.S. Open) but missed the cut in each of them. He came within one shot of making the cut at the 2004 Masters Tournament, but had a double-bogey on the 36th and final hole.

== Amateur wins ==
- 2002 Pennsylvania Amateur
- 2003 U.S. Mid-Amateur
- 2007 West Penn Amateur
- 2008 West Penn Amateur
- 2009 West Penn Amateur, U.S. Mid-Amateur, Pennsylvania Amateur
- 2010 West Penn Amateur, U.S. Mid-Amateur
- 2011 R. Jay Sigel Match Play, Sunnehanna Amateur
- 2012 U.S. Mid-Amateur
- 2013 R. Jay Sigel Match Play
- 2015 U.S. Amateur Four-Ball (with Todd White), R. Jay Sigel Match Play
- 2017 R. Jay Sigel Match Play

== Results in major championships ==
Tournament	2004	2005	2006	2007	2008	2009	2010	2011	2012	2013
Masters Tournament	CUT						CUT	CUT		CUT
U.S. Open	CUT									

Note: Smith only played in the Masters Tournament and the U.S. Open.

Did not play

CUT = missed the half-way cut

== U.S. national team appearances ==
Amateur

- Walker Cup: 2009 (winners), 2011, 2013 (winners)
