= Bobby Greenwood (golfer) =

American professional golfer (born 1938)

Personal information
- Full name: Robert Stanton Greenwood, Jr.
- Nationality: United States
- Born: October 27, 1938 (age 88) Cookeville, Tennessee, U.S.
- Children: 3

Career
- Sport: Golf
- College: North Texas State University
- Turned professional: 1969
- Former tours: PGA Tour; Champions Tour
- Professional wins: 5

Best results in major championships
- Masters Tournament: DNP
- PGA Championship: DNP
- U.S. Open: T49: 1971
- The Open Championship: DNP

Robert Stanton Greenwood, Jr. (born October 27, 1938) is an American professional golfer who played on the PGA Tour from 1969 to 1975. He is a PGA of America Life Member.

== Early life ==
Greenwood was born in Cookeville, Tennessee. He began golfing at the Cookeville Country Club at the age of 12.

== Amateur career ==
Greenwood played college golf at North Texas State University. During this era, he was ranked in the Top Ten Amateurs in the United States by Golf Magazine and Golf Digest three times each.

== Professional career ==
In 1969, Greenwood turned pro. Late in the year, he earned playing privileges for the PGA Tour at Spring 1969 PGA Tour Qualifying School. He played the PGA Tour for seven years. In 1970, he won the Rhode Island Open, a satellite event on tour.

After leaving the PGA Tour in 1975, Greenwood was Director of Golf at Sawgrass Country Club in Ponte Vedra Beach, Florida, 1977 and 1978. A PGA of America Life Member, Greenwood also received the Tennessee 2007 PGA Distinguished Career Award and 2005 PGA President's Council Award.

Greenwood is now a golf course architect out of his hometown, Cookeville, Tennessee.

== Awards and honors ==
- In 1962, he was awarded the Dick Smith Memorial Award for Outstanding College Golfer
- In November 2002, Greenwood was inducted into the North Texas State University Sports Hall of Fame
- In 2005, he was awarded the PGA President's Council Award
- In September 2007, Greenwood was inducted into the Tennessee Golf Hall of Fame
- In October 2007, Greenwood was inducted as a charter member of the Riverside Military Academy Centennial All-Sports Hall of Fame
- In 2010, he earned the Tennessee PGA Distinguished Career Award (retroactive 2007)

== Amateur wins ==
- 1960 Irvin Cobb Open Championship (amateur division)
- 1963 Irvin Cobb Open Championship (amateur division)
- 1965 Sunnehanna Amateur
- 1966 Tennessee Amateur
- 1968 Sunnehanna Amateur

== Professional wins (5) ==
- 1968 Tennessee Open
- 1970 Rhode Island Open
- 1991 Tennessee Senior PGA Champion
- 1992 Tennessee Senior PGA Champion
- 1994 Tennessee Senior PGA Champion

== See also ==
- Spring 1969 PGA Tour Qualifying School graduates
