= Miacomet Golf Course =

Public golf club in Nantucket, Massachusetts

- Location within Massachusetts
- 41°15′24.2244″N 70°7′20.5248″W

Club information
- Location: Nantucket, Massachusetts, U.S.
- Established: 1963
- Type: Public
- Owner: Nantucket Land Bank (1985-present)
- Operator: NGM, Inc.
- Tota holes: 18
- Website: www.miacometgolf.com

Miacomet Golf Course is the only public 18-hole golf course on Nantucket.

== History ==
In 1956, Ralph P. Marble, a Michigan-native, bought 400-acres of land on Nantucket with dairy farm intentions. The area he bought was called by the old Wampanoag inhabitants "Miacomet", which meant "The Meeting Place". Marble stated that he decided to build a golf course because the dairy market was not doing well.

In 1960, Marble began building the Miacomet Golf Course. In 1963, the Miacomet Golf Course opened as a public year-round golf course. In the early 1970s, due to a fire, the clubhouse was rebuilt without spending any money as the island community provided donated lumber and free labor to replace the original.

In 1983, Marble put the course up for sale and it was planned to be developed into a 216-lot subdivision. In 1985, the Nantucket Island Land Bank (Land Bank) worked with developers to negotiate the purchase of the Miacomet Golf Course for $4.5 million.

After this purchase, the Land Bank made a deal to lease the course operations back to the previous owners who still owned the clubhouse property. During the 1990s, the Land Bank was working on plans to expand this 9-hole course into a 18-hole course.

In 2003, the Lank Bank expanded the original 9-hole course into the only public 18-hole course on the island. It was at this point that the previous owners deeded the clubhouse property to the Land Bank in exchange for grandfathered-in course memberships.

=== Current operations ===
Miacomet Golf Course is currently a public golf course with memberships capped at 300 members. The Land Bank currently contracts course management to Nantucket Golf Management (NGM), Inc, an affiliate of Morningstar Golf and Hospitality, LLC which is the same management team running the Siasconset Golf Club; one of the other golf courses on Nantucket, Falmouth CC and clubs in the New York metro area and the United Kingdom.

During the 41st U.S. Mid-Amateur, Miacomet Golf Course was one of the stroke play co-hosts alongside other co-host Sankaty Head Golf Club.

== Scorecard ==
Miacomet Golf Course (All measurements made in yards)
Tee	Rating/Slope	1	2	3	4	5	6	7	8	9	Out	10	11	12	13	14	15	16	17	18	In	Total
Gold	73.6 / 128	397	347	213	500	510	387	437	233	383	3407	410	378	206	425	510	177	439	446	492	3483	6890
Blue	71.5 / 125	380	328	191	464	473	350	389	210	357	3142	398	351	184	390	486	152	397	416	477	3251	6393
Blue/White	70.6 / 124	368	328	163	464	453	350	345	210	330	3011	369	351	184	377	486	122	397	393	439	3156	6169
White	70.0 / 124	368	311	163	434	453	315	345	187	330	2906	369	331	167	377	450	122	374	393	439	3022	5928
Red/White	M: 69.2 / 123 W: 72.3 / 125	299	311	152	434	408	315	312	109	330	2670	313	331	167	337	450	122	330	292	439	2781	5451
Red	70.6 / 121	299	284	152	402	408	277	312	109	272	2515	313	313	133	337	400	93	330	292	419	2630	5145
Par	Men's and Women's	4	4	3	5	5	4	4	3	4	36	4	4	3	4	5	3	4	4	5	36	72
SI	Men's	3	11	15	5	9	13	1	7	17		6	16	14	8	12	18	2	4	10
SI	Women's	5	13	15	3	1	9	7	17	11		12	8	16	10	2	18	6	14	4

* Source: BlueGolf

== See also ==
- Siasconset Golf Club
- Sankaty Head Golf Club
