= Bill Hyndman =

American amateur golfer (1915–2001)

Personal information
- Full name: William Hyndman III
- Nationality: United States
- Born: December 25, 1915 Glenside, Pennsylvania, U.S.
- Died: September 6, 2001 (aged 85) Huntingdon Valley, Pennsylvania, U.S.

Career
- Sport: Golf

Best results in major championships
- Masters Tournament: T18: 1959
- PGA Championship: DNP
- U.S. Open: T13: 1957
- The Open Championship: DNP

William Hyndman III (December 25, 1915 – September 6, 2001) was an American amateur golfer. He finished runner-up in four amateur major championships.

== Career ==
Hyndman was born in Glenside, Pennsylvania, on December 25, 1915.

Hyndman had success in a lot of amateur tournaments. He was runner-up at the 1955 U.S. Amateur. At the 1959 British Amateur, he defeated Jack Nicklaus in the quarterfinals but lost to Deane Beman in the final match. He finished runner-up again in 1969 and 1970.

Hyndman won the U.S. Senior Amateur twice: in 1973 and 1983.

== Death ==
Ailing with Parkinson's disease during the final years of his life, Hyndman died at the age of 85 at his home in Huntingdon Valley, Pennsylvania on September 6, 2001.

== Tournament wins ==
- 1935 Philadelphia Amateur
- 1958 Philadelphia Amateur
- 1961 North and South Amateur
- 1958 Sunnehanna Amateur
- 1965 Philadelphia Amateur
- 1967 Sunnehanna Amateur
- 1968 Philadelphia Open Championship (as an amateur), Trans-Mississippi Amateur
- 1969 Philadelphia Open Championship (as an amateur)
- 1970 American Seniors Golf Association Stroke Play Championship
- 1971 American Seniors Golf Association Stroke Play Championship
- 1973 U.S. Senior Amateur, American Seniors Golf Association Match Play Championship
- 1974 Northeast Amateur, American Seniors Golf Association Stroke Play Championship
- 1977 American Seniors Golf Association Match Play Championship
- 1978 American Seniors Golf Association Stroke Play Championship
- 1980 Philadelphia Senior Amateur, American Seniors Golf Association Stroke Play Championship
- 1983 U.S. Senior Amateur

== Results in major championships ==
Tournament	1949	1950	1951	1952	1953	1954	1955	1956	1957	1958	1959
Masters Tournament								T53		T26	T18
U.S. Open								T37	T13		CUT
U.S. Amateur	R256	R64	R256			R128	2	R256	R128	R128	QF
The Amateur Championship											2

Tournament	1960	1961	1962	1963	1964	1965	1966	1967	1968	1969
Masters Tournament		CUT	WD	T35		T42				
U.S. Open		T42	T45	CUT				CUT		
U.S. Amateur	QF	R256	R256	R256		–	–	–	–	–
The Amateur Championship						QF	R32			2

Tournament	1970	1971	1972	1973	1974
Masters Tournament	CUT		CUT		
U.S. Open	WD				T63
The Amateur Championship	2	R256			

Top 10
Did not play

CUT = missed the half-way cut
WD = withdrew
R256, R128, R64, R32, R16, QF, SF = round in which player lost in match play
"T" indicates a tie for a place

Source for The Masters: www.masters.com

Source for U.S. Amateur and U.S. Open: USGA Championship Database

== U.S. national team appearances ==
- Walker Cup: 1957 (winners), 1959 (winners), 1961 (winners), 1969 (winners), 1971
- Eisenhower Trophy: 1958 (individual leader, tie), 1960 (winners)
- Americas Cup: 1958 (winners), 1960 (winners), 1961 (winners)
