= Auld Lang Syne (house) =

Historic house on Nantucket Island, Massachusetts, United States

Coordinates: 41.262581°N 69.963855°W

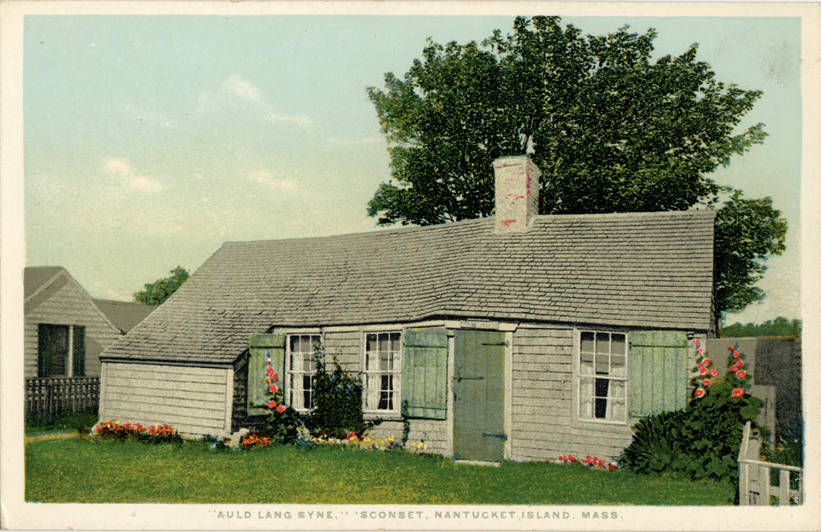
Auld Lang Syne in an early postcard

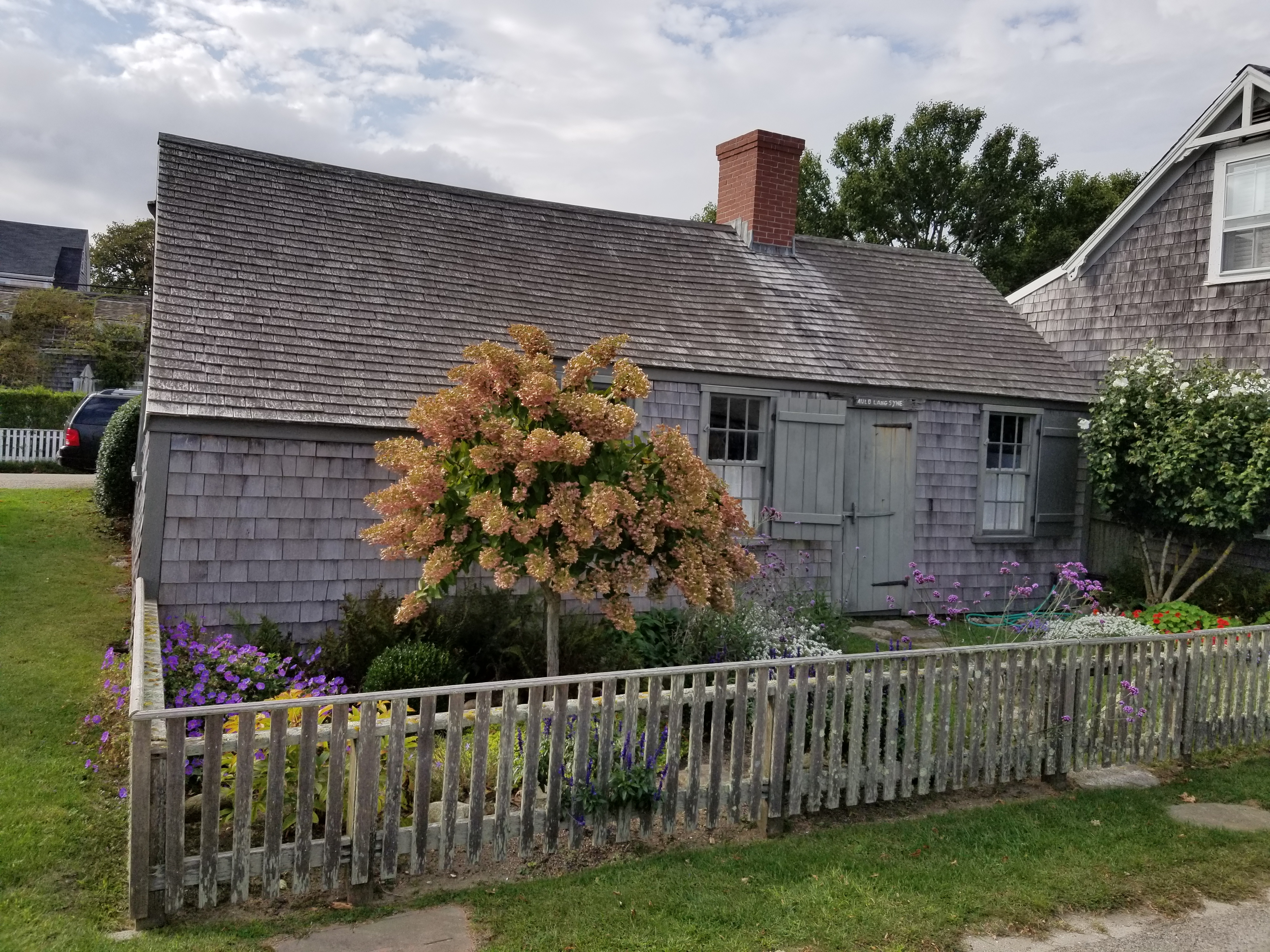
Auld Lang Syne in Siasconset village on Nantucket

Auld Lang Syne is one of the oldest houses on the island Nantucket, Massachusetts and is located at 6 Broadway in Siasconset. The oldest part of the house was constructed around 1675 making it possibly older than the more well-known Jethro Coffin House. According to one source, Auld Lang Syne was constructed

by Michael [or Micah] Coffin, who employed Native Americans to fish for him while he remained ashore to do the cooking. The house grew from a rectangular structure with a great room and two small chambers to the south. In the eighteenth century it evolved into a T-plan structure with low shed-roof extensions. It was expanded in the eighteenth and nineteenth centuries with warts on the south side, a kitchen at the north side, and a shed.

Some had speculated that the house was moved to the current location from an earlier location at a fishing village in Pedee near Quidnet, but there's no evidence to support this. The house was owned by Captain Henry Coleman and his heirs from the eighteenth century to 1937 when it was acquired by architect Sartain Smith and then his heir Mishi Kamiya and then her sister Matsuko (Dorothy) Suga. In the early 1990s Max Johnson then purchased and restored the house which was then in deteriorating condition and near collapse; Sam Daniel bought the house in 2002.

== See also ==
- List of the oldest buildings in Massachusetts
