= U.S. Mid-Amateur =

Amateur golf tournament

The U.S. Mid-Amateur, often called the Mid-Am for short, is the leading annual golf tournament in the United States for post-college amateur golfers, organized by the USGA.

== History ==
It was first played in 1981 (45 years ago) at Bellerive Country Club in Creve Coeur, Missouri, near St. Louis. The Mid-Am was the first new USGA championship in 19 years, since the U.S. Senior Women's Amateur was added in 1962.

Qualifications for the Mid-Am are similar to those for the U.S. Amateur, except for the following:

- Competitors must be at least 25 years old as of the opening day of the main tournament.
- Competitors must have a USGA handicap index of 2.4 or lower, as opposed to 0.4 or lower for the U.S. Amateur.

The U.S. Mid-Amateur does not have a gender restriction, but there has never been a female champion. The USGA's analogous event for women only is the U.S. Women's Mid-Amateur, first played in 1987.

The USGA specifically intended the Mid-Am as a championship for post-college golfers who were not pursuing golf as a career, as virtually all golfers who pursue a professional career decide to do so no later than their early twenties. This was most likely a response to the fact that less than half of all U.S. Amateur qualifiers are 25 or older, and most older golfers found themselves disadvantaged in competing against college golfers who typically play much more often.

Like the U.S. Amateur, the Mid-Am consists of two days of stroke play, with the leading 64 competitors then playing a knockout competition held at match play to decide the champion. The profile of Mid-Am champions, with respect to age, is somewhat similar to that of U.S. Amateur champions before World War II. In that era, more top-level golfers chose to remain amateur, and the average age of U.S. Amateur Champions was higher.

While the list of winners is considerably less illustrious than that of the U.S. Amateur, one notable winner was Jay Sigel, a three-time winner of this event and a two-time U.S. Amateur champion who went on to play the Champions Tour. The winner receives an automatic invitation to play in the Masters Tournament and the U.S. Open (starting in 2018).

== Winners ==
Year	Winner	Score	Runner-up	Venue
2026	(United States) Andrew Bailey	5 & 4	(United States) Nate Smith	Sand Valley Resort (The Lido and Sand Valley Courses) (WI)
2025	(United States) Brandon Holtz	3 & 2	(United States) Jeg Coughlin III	Troon Country Club; Troon North Golf Club (AZ)
2024	(United States) Evan Beck	9 & 8	(United States) Bobby Massa	Kinloch Golf Club; Independence Golf Club (VA)
2023	(United States) Stewart Hagestad (3)	3 & 2	(United States) Evan Beck	Sleepy Hollow Country Club; Fenway Golf Club (NY)
2022	(Northern Ireland) Matthew McClean	3 & 1	(Republic of Ireland) Hugh Foley	Erin Hills; Blue Mound Golf & Country Club (WI)
2021	(United States) Stewart Hagestad (2)	2 & 1	(United States) Mark Costanza	Sankaty Head Golf Club; Miacomet Golf Course (MA)
2020	Tournament canceled due to the COVID-19 pandemic			Kinloch Golf Club
2019	(Australia) Lukas Michel	2 & 1	(United States) Joseph Deraney	Colorado Golf Club; CommonGround Golf Course (CO)
2018	(United States) Kevin O'Connell	4 & 3	(United States) Brett Boner	Charlotte Country Club; Carolina Golf Club (NC)
2017	(United States) Matt Parziale	8 & 6	(United States) Josh Nichols	Capital City Club; Atlanta National Golf Club (GA)
2016	(United States) Stewart Hagestad	37 holes	(United States) Scott Harvey	Stonewall (Old and North Courses) (PA)
2015	(United States) Sammy Schmitz	3 & 2	(United States) Marc Dull	John's Island Club (West and North Courses) (FL)
2014	(United States) Scott Harvey	6 & 5	(United States) Brad Nurski	Saucon Valley Country Club (Old and Weyhill Courses) (PA)
2013	(United States) Mike McCoy	8 & 6	(United States) Bill Williamson	Country Club of Birmingham (West and East Courses) (AL)
2012	(United States) Nathan Smith (4)	1 up	(Canada) Garrett Rank	Conway Farms Golf Club; Knollwood Club (IL)
2011	(United States) Randal Lewis	3 & 2	(United States) Kenny Cook	Shadow Hawk Golf Club; Houstonian Golf and Country Club (TX)
2010	(United States) Nathan Smith (3)	7 & 5	(United States) Tim Hogarth	Atlantic Golf Club; The Bridge (NY)
2009	(United States) Nathan Smith (2)	7 & 6	(United States) Tim Spitz	The Kiawah Island Club (Cassique and River Courses) (SC)
2008	(United States) Steve Wilson	5 & 4	(United States) Todd Mitchell	Milwaukee Country Club; Brown Deer Park (WI)
2007	(United States) Trip Kuehne	9 & 7	(United States) Dan Whitaker	Bandon Dunes Golf Resort (Bandon Dunes and Bandon Trails) (OR)
2006	(United States) Dave Womack	1 up	(United States) Ryan Hybl	Forest Highlands Golf Club (Canyon and Meadow Courses) (AZ)
2005	(United States) Kevin Marsh	10 & 9	(United States) Carlton Forrester	The Honors Course; Black Creek Club (TN)
2004	(United States) Austin Eaton III	1 up	(United States) Josh Dennis	Sea Island Golf Club (Seaside and Plantation Courses) (GA)
2003	(United States) Nathan Smith	9 holes*	(United States) Bryan Norton	Wilmington Country Club (South and North Courses) (DE)
2002	(United States) George Zahringer	3 & 2	(United States) Jerry Courville Jr.	The Stanwich Club; Round Hill Club (CT)
2001	(United States) Tim Jackson (2)	1 up	(United States) George Zahringer	San Joaquin Country Club (CA)
2000	(United States) Greg Puga	3 & 1	(South Africa) Wayne Raath	The Homestead (Cascades Course) (VA)
1999	(United States) Danny Green	2 & 1	(United States) Jerry Courville Jr.	Old Warson Country Club (MO)
1998	(United States) Spider Miller (2)	1 up	(United States) Chip Halcombe	NCR Country Club (South Course) (OH)
1997	(United States) Ken Bakst	1 up	(United States) Rick Stimmel	Dallas Athletic Club (Blue Course) (TX)
1996	(United States) Spider Miller	3 & 2	(United States) Randal Lewis	Hartford Golf Club (CT)
1995	(United States) Jerry Courville Jr.	1 up	(Canada) Warren Sye	Caves Valley Golf Club (MD)
1994	(United States) Tim Jackson	1 up	(United States) Tommy Brennan	Hazeltine National Golf Club (MN)
1993	(United States) Jeff Thomas	1 up	(United States) Joey Ferrari	Eugene Country Club (OR)
1992	(United States) Danny Yates	1 up	(United States) David Lind	Detroit Golf Club (North Course) (MI)
1991	(United States) Jim Stuart (2)	1 up	(United States) Bert Atkinson	Long Cove Club (SC)
1990	(United States) Jim Stuart	1 up	(United States) Mark Sollenberger	Troon Golf & Country Club (AZ)
1989	(United States) James Taylor	4 & 3	(United States) Bill Hadden	Crooked Stick Golf Club (IN)
1988	(United States) David Eger	2 & 1	(Bermuda) Scott Mayne	Prairie Dunes Country Club (KS)
1987	(United States) Jay Sigel (3)	20 holes	(United States) David Lind	Brook Hollow Golf Club (TX)
1986	(United States) Bill Loeffler	4 & 3	(United States) Charles Pinkard	Annandale Golf Club (WI)
1985	(United States) Jay Sigel (2)	3 & 2	(United States) O. Gordon Brewer Jr.	The Vintage Club (Mountain Course) (CA)
1984	(United States) Michael Podolak	5 & 4	(United States) Bob Lewis	Atlanta Athletic Club (Highlands Course) (GA)
1983	(United States) Jay Sigel	1 up	(United States) Randy Sonnier	Cherry Hills Country Club (CO)
1982	(United States) William Hoffer	3 & 2	(United States) Jeffrey Ellis	Knollwood Club (IL)
1981	(United States) Jim Holtgrieve	2 up	(United States) Bob Lewis	Bellerive Country Club (MO)

* Match was conceded due to injury

== Future sites ==
Year	Edition	Course	Location	Dates
2027	46th	Jupiter Hills Club	Tequesta, Florida	September 18–23
2028	47th	Country Club of Charleston	Charleston, South Carolina	September 23–28
2029	48th	The Golf Club of Tennessee	Kingston Springs, Tennessee	TBD
2030	49th	Bel-Air Country Club	Los Angeles, California	September 14−19
2031	50th	Sunriver Resort (Crosswater Course)	Sunriver, Oregon	September 6–11
2032	51st	Salem Country Club	Peabody, Massachusetts	TBD
2033	52nd	Baltusrol Golf Club	Springfield, New Jersey	TBD
2034	53rd	Champions Golf Club	Houston, Texas	TBD
2036	55th	Southern Hills Country Club	Tulsa, Oklahoma	TBD
