= Troon Country Club =

Community in Maricopa County, Arizona, US

Coordinates: 33°42′45″N 111°51′10″W

Troon is a development consisting of a country club, golf course and housing in North Scottsdale, Arizona, United States. The golf course was designed by Jay Morrish and Tom Weiskopf.
