= Scott Harvey =

American golfer

Personal information
- Nationality: United States
- Born: May 30, 1978 (age 48) Greensboro, North Carolina, U.S.
- Height: 6 ft 4 in (1.93 m)
- Weight: 190 lb (86 kg; 14 st)

Career
- Sport: Golf
- College: University of West Florida; High Point University
- Status: Amateur
- Professional wins: 1

Best results in major championships
- Masters Tournament: CUT: 2015
- PGA Championship: DNP
- U.S. Open: CUT: 2017
- The Open Championship: DNP

Scott Harvey (born May 30, 1978) is an American amateur golfer.

== Career ==
In 2014, he won the U.S. Mid-Amateur, defeating Brad Nurski, 6 and 5, in the 36-hole championship match. His win in the U.S. Mid-Amateur resulted in an invitation to the 2015 Masters Tournament, his first major championship, where he was cut after the second round after shooting 76-81, with a total score of +13.

Harvey also won the 2015 South American Amateur in Peru, finishing with a two shot margin of victory.

== Tournament wins ==
- 2011 Carolinas Amateur, North Carolina Open
- 2012 Carolinas Mid-Amateur, North Carolina Mid-Amateur
- 2013 Carolinas Mid-Amateur
- 2014 Cardinal Amateur, U.S. Mid-Amateur
- 2015 South American Amateur, Gasparilla Invitational
- 2016 Carolinas Mid Amateur, George C Thomas Invitational
- 2017 Pine Needles Invitational w/ Brian Westveer, George L Coleman Invitational, George C Thomas Invitational, North Carolina Mid-Amateur
- 2018 George C Thomas Invitational
- 2019 George L Coleman Invitational, George C Thomas Invitational - Mid-Amateur, U.S. Amateur Four-Ball (with Todd Mitchell)
- 2021 Carolinas Amateur Championship
- 2023 Huddleston Cup
- 2024 Huddleston Cup

== Results in major championships ==
! Tournament	2015	2016	2017
Masters Tournament	CUT		
U.S. Open			CUT
The Open Championship			
PGA Championship			

Did not play

CUT = missed the half-way cut

== U.S. national team appearances ==
Amateur

- Walker Cup: 2015
