= Siasconset, Massachusetts =

- Census designated place
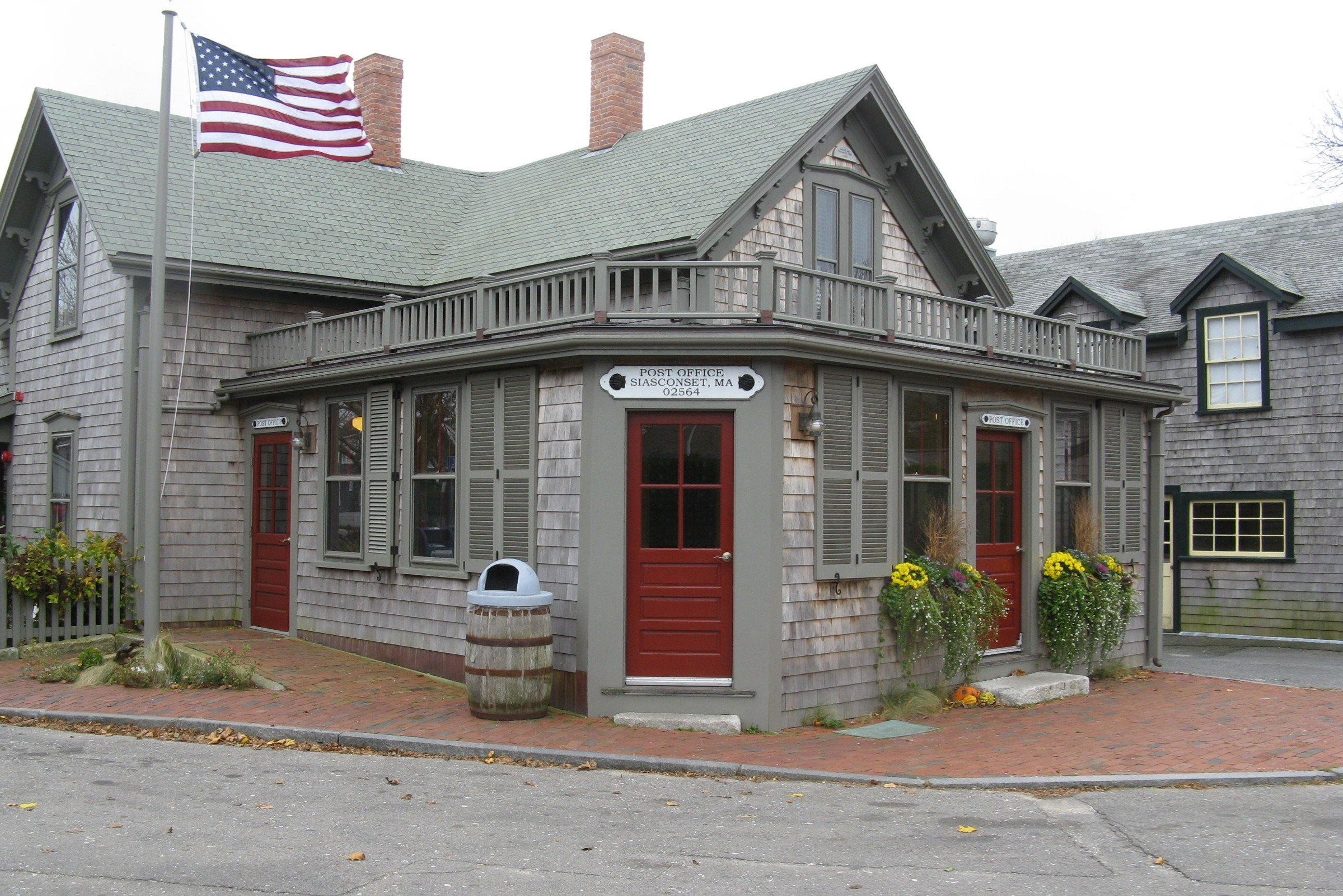
- Post Office, Siasconset, Massachusetts

- Location in Nantucket County and the state of Massachusetts.
- Coordinates: 41°15′45″N 69°57′58″W
- Country: United States
- State: Massachusetts
- County: Nantucket
- Elevation: 52 ft (16 m)

Population (2010)
  - Total: 205
- Time zone: UTC-5 (Eastern (EST))
  - Summer (DST): UTC-4 (EDT)
- ZIP Code: 02564
- Area code: 508
- GNIS feature ID: 616962

Siasconset is a census-designated place (CDP) at the eastern end of Nantucket Island, Massachusetts, United States, with an elevation of 52 feet (16 m). As of the 2020 census, Siasconset had a population of 505. Although unincorporated, the village has a post office, with the ZIP code 02564.

The various spellings of its name, 'Sconset, Sconset, Seconset, Siasconsett, or Sweseckechi led the Board on Geographic Names to designate its official spelling in 1892. Three of the four golf courses located on the island are in Siasconset: the Siasconset Golf Club, the Sankaty Head Golf Club, and the Nantucket Golf Club.

== History ==
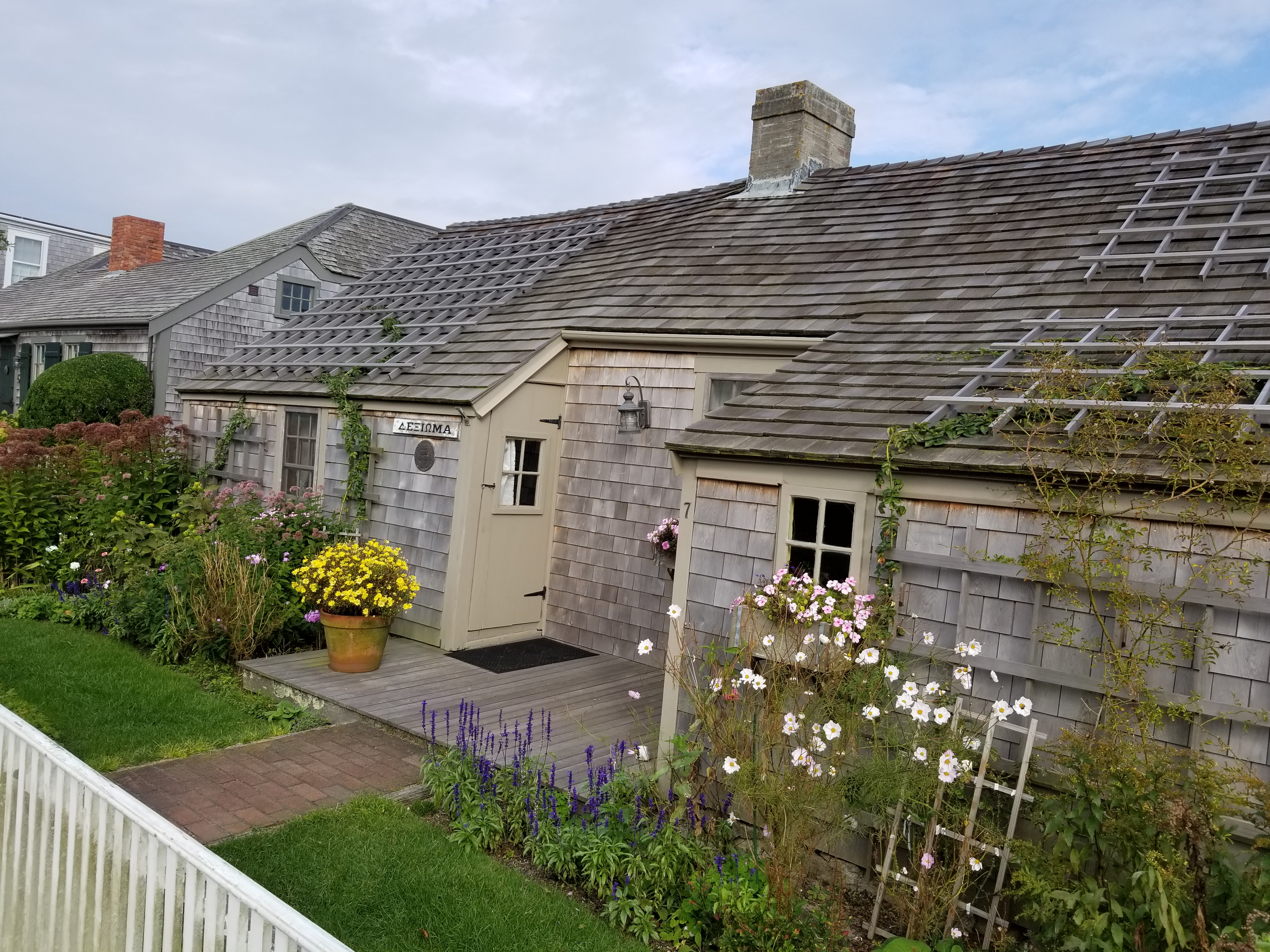
Dexioma House in Sconset

The area was settled as a fishing village in the 17th century. The core of Auld Lang Syne, one of the older fishing shacks, is believed to date from the 1670s, potentially making it one of the oldest houses on Nantucket. Various other cottages date from the 18th and 19th centuries. Many of the houses were haphazardly expanded, contributing to the unique look of these Nantucket cottages.

In the 19th century a whaling station was present in the village. In 1877 Edward Underhill from Wolcott, New York, bought land in the village, and constructed new cottages in the fashion of the original fishing shacks, and then rented them to summer tourists before they were sold after his death.

In the early 20th century, Sconset was a summer retreat for an actor's colony which included Digby Bell, George Fawcett, Joseph Jefferson, Charles Penrose, Hassard Short, William H. Thompson and his wife Isabel Irving, DeWolf Hopper, Frank Gillmore and his daughters Ruth and Margalo Gillmore, among others.

Bill Belichick, former coach of the New England Patriots football team, has lived in Siasconset in the NFL off-season since 1979 and owns several properties in the town with a combined value of over $10 million.

In recent years, the exposed bluffs of the village have experienced significant erosion. A local remediation program using geotubes has proven controversial.

== Etymology ==
Siasconset is a Wampanoag Algonquian term for “place of great bones.” Si from missi, meaning “great;” ascon from askon, meaning “horn or bone”.
