= First Tee =

Non-Profit Golf Organization

First Tee is a 501(c)(3) nonprofit organization with the stated goal of improving children's life skills through golf lessons. Based in Ponta Vedra Beach, Florida, the organization claims to teach more than 3.6 million youth annually through programs across the country and internationally.

PGA Tour commissioner Jay Monahan serves as chairman of the board of governors, which is composed of business leaders. Sports broadcaster Jim Nantz serves as the honorary chair; he succeeded former President George W. Bush and President George H. W. Bush.

== History ==
First Tee was founded in 1997. Started by PGA Tour Commissioner Tim Finchem, the organization began as a partnership among the PGA Tour, PGA of America, LPGA, USGA, and the Masters Tournament Foundation. The goal was to make golf affordable and accessible for all kids.

In 2019, First Tee became a nonprofit corporation, PGA Tour First Tee Foundation. First Tee has featured in the PURE Insurance Championship, a PGA Tour Champions event played annually in September at the Pebble Beach Golf Links and Spyglass Hill Golf Course in California.

== Demographics ==
The participants of First Tee are children aged five to 18, with participants progressing through the program over time.

== First Tee School Program ==
Since 2004, First Tee claims to have trained educators at more than 10,000 elementary schools to teach physical education courses.

== See also ==
- Walter Morgan
