= Vinny Giles =

American amateur golfer and golf administrator

Personal information
- Full name: Marvin M. Giles III
- Nationality: United States
- Born: January 4, 1943 (age 83) Lynchburg, Virginia, U.S.
- Height: 6 ft 0 in (1.83 m)
- Weight: 170 lb (77 kg; 12 st)

Career
- Sport: Golf
- College: University of Georgia; University of Virginia
- Status: Amateur

Best results in major championships
- Masters Tournament: T22: 1968
- PGA Championship: DNP
- U.S. Open: 17th: 1973
- The Open Championship: DNP

Marvin McCrary "Vinny" Giles III (born January 4, 1943) is an American amateur golfer. He is best known for winning the U.S. Amateur, British Amateur and U.S. Senior Amateur, one of only two men to have accomplished the feat, the last at age 66.

== Career ==
In 1943, Giles was born in Lynchburg, Virginia. He studied at the Episcopal High School in Alexandria, Virginia. In 1966, he graduated from the University of Georgia where he was a three-time All-American on the golf team. Three years later he graduated from the University of Virginia Law School.

Giles finished second in the U.S. Amateur three straight years, 1967 to 1969, before finally winning in 1972. This was in the stroke play era. His victory in the British Amateur came in 1975. He won numerous other amateur tournaments, including seven Virginia State Amateurs as well as three Virginia Open titles.

Giles played on four Walker Cup teams: in 1969, 1971, 1973, 1975. His team won three times and he captained the 1993 team to victory. He also played on three victorious Eisenhower Trophy teams (1968, 1970, 1972) and captained the 1992 team to a runner-up finish.

Giles played in 11 professional majors, making the cut in three of his nine Masters Tournament appearances and in both U.S. Open appearances. He was low amateur in the 1968 Masters Tournament (tied for 22nd) and in the 1973 U.S. Open (17th). He was also low amateur in three U.S. Senior Opens: in 1993, 1996, and 1997.

Giles served on the Executive Committee of the Virginia State Golf Association for over 20 years and then was first an Associate Director and then a Director of the Southern Golf Association for three years. Giles is also the owner and president of a golf management firm which represents such golfers as Tom Kite, Davis Love III, Lanny Wadkins, Bobby Wadkins, Beth Daniel, and Meg Mallon.

== Personal life ==
Giles lives in Richmond, Virginia.

== Awards and honors ==
- In 1976, Giles was inducted into the Virginia Sports Hall of Fame.
- In 1984, Giles was inducted into the Southern Golf Association Hall of Fame.
- In 2016, Giles was inducted into the Virginia Golf Hall of Fame

== Tournament wins ==
- 1962 Virginia State Amateur
- 1963 Dogwood Invitational
- 1964 Virginia State Amateur
- 1965 Dogwood Invitational
- 1966 Virginia State Amateur
- 1967 Southern Amateur
- 1968 Virginia State Amateur
- 1969 Virginia State Amateur, Virginia Open
- 1971 Northeast Amateur, Virginia State Amateur
- 1972 U.S. Amateur
- 1973 Porter Cup, Eastern Amateur
- 1974 Virginia Open
- 1975 British Amateur, Southern Amateur
- 1987 Virginia State Amateur
- 1990 Crump Cup
- 1993 Virginia Open
- 2000 Virginia State Senior Amateur
- 2002 Society of Seniors Dale Morey Championship, George Coleman Invitational Senior, David A. King Senior Legends Invitational, Senior Hall of Fame
- 2007 Crump Cup Senior
- 2009 U.S. Senior Amateur
- 2010 Crump Cup Senior

== Results in major championships ==
| Tournament | 1968 | 1969 | 1970 | 1971 | 1972 | 1973 | 1974 | 1975 | 1976 | 1977 |
|---|---|---|---|---|---|---|---|---|---|---|
| Masters Tournament | T22LA | CUT | T38 | CUT | CUT | T34 | CUT | | CUT | CUT |
| U.S. Open | | | T66 | | | 17LA | | | | |

Note: Giles never played in The Open Championship or PGA Championship

Did not play

LA = low amateur
CUT = missed the half way cut
"T" indicates a tie for a place.

== U.S. national team appearances ==
Amateur

- Walker Cup: 1969 (winners), 1971, 1973 (winners), 1975 (winners), 1993 (winners, non-playing captain)
- Eisenhower Trophy: 1968 (team winners and individual leader, tie), 1970 (winners), 1972 (winners)
- Americas Cup: 1967 (winners)
