= Kuzuha International =

Tournament information
- Location: Hirakata, Osaka, Japan
- Established: 1965
- Course: Kuzuha Public Golf Course
- Par: 70
- Tour: Japan Golf Tour
- Format: Stroke play
- Prize fund: ¥15,000,000
- Final year: 1990

Tournament record score
- Aggregate: 129 Tsutomu Irie (1985)
- To par: −11 as above

Final champion
- (Japan) Yoshimi Niizeki
- Location in Japan Location in the Osaka Prefecture

The Kuzuha International was a professional golf tournament in Japan between 1965 and 1990. It was played at the Kuzuha Public Golf Course in Kuzuha, Hirakata, Osaka. From 1978 to 1983, it was a Japan Golf Tour event.

In 1985, Tsutomu Irie became the first player to break the 60 barrier in major professional tournament in Japan when he scored 59 (11 under par) in the first round.

== History ==
The first two editions were a five-man invitation event played over 18 holes, after which it was a larger single-day 36-hole tournament. The first international players competed in 1971. It was reduced to a 27-hole event in 1972 and 1973, before becoming a two-day 36 hole tournament from 1974.

== Winners ==
Year	Winner	Score	To par	Margin of victory	Runner(s)-up	Ref
1990	(Japan) Yoshimi Niizeki	132	−8	1 stroke	(Japan) Tadao Nakamura	
1989	(Japan) Tōru Nakamura	133	−7	1 stroke	(Japan) Satoshi Higashi	
1988	(Australia) Wayne Smith	131	−9	2 strokes	(Japan) Yasuhiro Funatogawa (Australia) Craig Parry	
1987	(Japan) Katsunari Takahashi	131	−9	1 stroke	(Australia) Brian Jones	
1986	(Japan) Yoshitaka Yamamoto	137	−3	Playoff (Note: Yamamoto won with a par on the first hole of a sudden-death playoff.)	(Japan) Seiichi Kanai	
1985	(Japan) Tsutomu Irie	129	−11	3 strokes	(United States) David Ishii	
1984	(Japan) Norio Suzuki	133	−7	1 stroke	(Australia) Wayne Grady (Japan) Yasuhiro Miyamoto	
1983	(Japan) Kikuo Arai	138	−2	Playoff (Note: Arai won with a par on the fourth hole of a sudden-death playoff; Sugimoto was eliminated when he made a bogey on the second extra hole.)	(United States) David Ishii (Japan) Teruo Sugihara	
1982	(Japan) Namio Takasu	102 (Note: Shortened to 27 holes due to weather.)	−3	1 stroke	(Japan) Yoshikazu Yokoshima	
1981	(Japan) Kosaku Shimada	133	−7	2 strokes	(Taiwan) Lu Liang-Huan (Japan) Nobumitsu Yuhara	
1980	(Japan) Yoshikazu Yokoshima	134	−6	2 strokes	(Japan) Tsutomu Irie (Japan) Shinsaku Maeda (Japan) Kenichi Yamada	
1979	(Taiwan) Hsieh Min-Nan	134	−6	2 strokes	(Japan) Fujio Kobayashi	
1978	(Japan) Akira Yabe	135	−5	1 stroke	(Australia) Brian Jones (Japan) Yoshikazu Yokoshima	
1977	(Australia) Greg Norman	135	−5	2 strokes	(Japan) Kikuo Arai	
1976	(Japan) Fujio Kobayashi	133	−7	1 stroke	(Taiwan) Chen Chien-chung (Taiwan) Hsieh Min-Nan	
1975	(Japan) Norio Suzuki	133	−7	1 stroke	(Australia) Ted Ball	
1974	(Japan) Namio Takasu	131	−9	3 strokes	(Japan) Masashi Ozaki	
1973	(South Korea) Han Chang-sang	102		Playoff (Note: Han won with a par on the first hole of a sudden-death playoff.)	(Australia) Graham Marsh	
1972	(Taiwan) Lu Liang-Huan	107		Playoff	(New Zealand) Walter Godfrey	
1971	(England) Guy Wolstenholme	139	−3	1 stroke	(Japan) Akio Kanemoto	
1970	(Japan) Hideyo Sugimoto	145	−1	2 strokes	(Japan) Kosaku Shimada	
1969	(Japan) Tadashi Kitta	136	−4	4 strokes	(Japan) Torakichi Nakamura	
1968	(Japan) Shozo Miyamoto	134	−6	2 strokes	(Japan) Susumu Arai	
1967	(Japan) Teruo Sugihara	136	−8	Playoff	(Japan) Hideyo Sugimoto	
1966	(Japan) Tadashi Kitta	65	−7	2 strokes	(Japan) Shozo Miyamoto	
1965	(Japan) Teruo Sugihara and (Japan) Toichiro Toda	65	−7	Tie	n/a	
