= Lanto Griffin =

American professional golfer (born 1988)

Personal information
- Full name: Lanto Maitreya Griffin
- Nationality: United States
- Born: June 15, 1988 (age 38) Mount Shasta, California, U.S.
- Height: 6 ft 3 in (1.91 m)
- Weight: 190 lb (86 kg; 14 st)

Career
- Sport: Golf
- College: Virginia Commonwealth University
- Turned professional: 2010
- Current tour: PGA Tour
- Former tours: Korn Ferry Tour; PGA Tour Latinoamérica
- Professional wins: 5
- Highest ranking: 49 (March 14, 2021) (as of October 25, 2026)

Number of wins by tour
- PGA Tour: 1
- Korn Ferry Tour: 2
- Other: 2

Best results in major championships
- Masters Tournament: CUT: 2020, 2021
- PGA Championship: T19: 2020
- U.S. Open: T35: 2021
- The Open Championship: T33: 2021

Lanto Maitreya Griffin (born June 15, 1988) is an American professional golfer on the PGA Tour.

== Early life ==
Griffin was born in Mount Shasta, California, and moved with his family at a young age to Blacksburg, Virginia. He played college golf at Virginia Commonwealth University where he was the 2009 Colonial Athletic Association Player of the Year. He turned professional in 2010.

== Professional career ==
Griffin played on the PGA Tour Latinoamérica in 2015 and 2016. He won the Roberto De Vicenzo Punta del Este Open Copa NEC in 2015. Also in 2015, Griffin won the Virginia Open.

At the Web.com Tour qualifying tournament in December 2016, Griffin missed qualification by just one stroke. Nonetheless, this enabled him to enter tournaments in 2017 as a reserve and to be eligible for a place in the reorder category.

Griffin won the Nashville Golf Open in June 2017, becoming the first player on tour in 13 years to win an event after making the cut on the number. He finished 23rd on the regular season Web.com Tour money list to secure his PGA Tour card for the 2017–18 season.

During the 2017–18 PGA season Griffin finished 171st in FedEx points.

Griffin played on the Korn Ferry Tour during its 2019 season and finished 6th overall for the regular season (The 25) driven by consistent performance and a win at the Robert Trent Jones Golf Trail Championship, earning him a spot on the PGA Tour for the second time.

Griffin had a great start to the 2019–20 PGA Tour season. He finished in the top 20 at A Military Tribute at The Greenbrier, the Sanderson Farms Championship, the Safeway Open, the Shriners Hospitals for Children Open, and the Bermuda Championship. On October 13, 2019, Griffin earned his first PGA Tour victory by winning the Houston Open.

== Professional wins (5) ==
=== PGA Tour wins (1) ===
| No. | Date | Tournament | Winning score | To par | Margin of victory | Runners-up |
|---|---|---|---|---|---|---|
| 1 | Oct 13, 2019 | Houston Open | 66-74-65-69=274 | −14 | 1 stroke | (United States) Scott Harrington, (United States) Mark Hubbard |

=== Korn Ferry Tour wins (2) ===
| No. | Date | Tournament | Winning score | To par | Margin of victory | Runner-up |
|---|---|---|---|---|---|---|
| 1 | Jul 2, 2017 | Nashville Golf Open | 72-70-62-68=272 | −16 | Playoff | (Mexico) Abraham Ancer |
| 2 | Apr 21, 2019 | Robert Trent Jones Golf Trail Championship | 68-68-69-68=273 | −15 | Playoff | (United States) Robby Shelton |

Korn Ferry Tour playoff record (2–0)

| No. | Year | Tournament | Opponent | Result |
|---|---|---|---|---|
| 1 | 2017 | Nashville Golf Open | (Mexico) Abraham Ancer | Won with birdie on first extra hole |
| 2 | 2019 | Robert Trent Jones Golf Trail Championship | (United States) Robby Shelton | Won with birdie on fourth extra hole |

=== PGA Tour Latinoamérica wins (1) ===
| No. | Date | Tournament | Winning score | To par | Margin of victory | Runner-up |
|---|---|---|---|---|---|---|
| 1 | Nov 1, 2015 | Roberto De Vicenzo Punta del Este Open Copa NEC | 67-68-68-68=271 | −9 | 2 strokes | (Puerto Rico) Rafael Campos |

=== Other wins (1) ===
- 2015 Virginia Open

== Results in major championships ==
Results not in chronological order before 2019 and in 2020.

| Tournament | 2018 | 2019 | 2020 | 2021 | 2022 | 2023 | 2024 | 2025 |
|---|---|---|---|---|---|---|---|---|
| Masters Tournament | | | CUT | CUT | | | | |
| PGA Championship | | | T19 | CUT | T60 | | | |
| U.S. Open | CUT | | T43 | T35 | CUT | | | CUT |
| The Open Championship | | | NT | T33 | | | | |

Did not play

CUT = missed the halfway cut
"T" = tied
NT = no tournament due to COVID-19 pandemic

== Results in The Players Championship ==
| Tournament | 2021 | 2022 | 2023 | 2024 | 2025 |
|---|---|---|---|---|---|
| The Players Championship | T35 | CUT | | | CUT |

Did not play

CUT = missed the halfway cut
"T" indicates a tie for a place

== Results in World Golf Championships ==
| Tournament | 2020 | 2021 |
|---|---|---|
| Championship | T29 | T22 |
| Match Play | NT^{1} | T61 |
| Invitational | | |
| Champions | NT^{1} | NT^{1} |

^{1}Cancelled due to COVID-19 pandemic

Did not play

NT = No tournament
"T" = Tied

== See also ==
- 2017 Web.com Tour Finals graduates
- 2019 Korn Ferry Tour Finals graduates
- 2024 PGA Tour Qualifying School graduates
