= Claude King (disambiguation) =

Claude King (1923–2013) was an American country music singer and songwriter.

Claude King may also refer to:

- Claude King (actor) (1875–1941), English actor
- Claude King (American football) (1938–2024), American football player
- Claude King, golfer who participated in the Virginia Open
- Claude King, founder of Sports Afield
