= Robert Wrenn (disambiguation) =

Robert Wrenn is the name of:

- Robert Wrenn (1873–1925), tennis champion
- Robert Wrenn (golfer) (born 1959), PGA Tour golfer

== See also ==
- Bob Wren, ice hockey player
