= Robert Trent Jones Golf Trail Championship =

Tournament information
- Location: Prattville, Alabama
- Established: 2019
- Courses: Robert Trent Jones Golf Trail (The Senator Course)
- Par: 72
- Length: 6,599 yards (6,034 m)
- Tour: Korn Ferry Tour
- Format: Stroke play
- Prize fund: US$550,000
- Month played: April
- Final year: 2019

Tournament record score
- Aggregate: 273 Lanto Griffin (2019); 273 Robby Shelton (2019)
- To par: −15 as above

Final champion
- (United States) Lanto Griffin

Location map
- Location in the United States Location in Alabama

The Robert Trent Jones Golf Trail Championship was a golf tournament on the Korn Ferry Tour. It was played in April 2019 at the Senator Course of the Robert Trent Jones Golf Trail in Prattville, Alabama. Lanto Griffin won the tournament, defeating Robby Shelton in a playoff. Both players finished the Web.com Tour regular season inside the top 25 on the points list, thereby graduating to the PGA Tour.

== Winners ==
Year	Winner	Score	To par	Margin of victory	Runner-up
2019	(United States) Lanto Griffin	273	−15	Playoff	(United States) Robby Shelton
