= 1970 Eisenhower Trophy =

Coordinates: 40.461°N 3.737°W

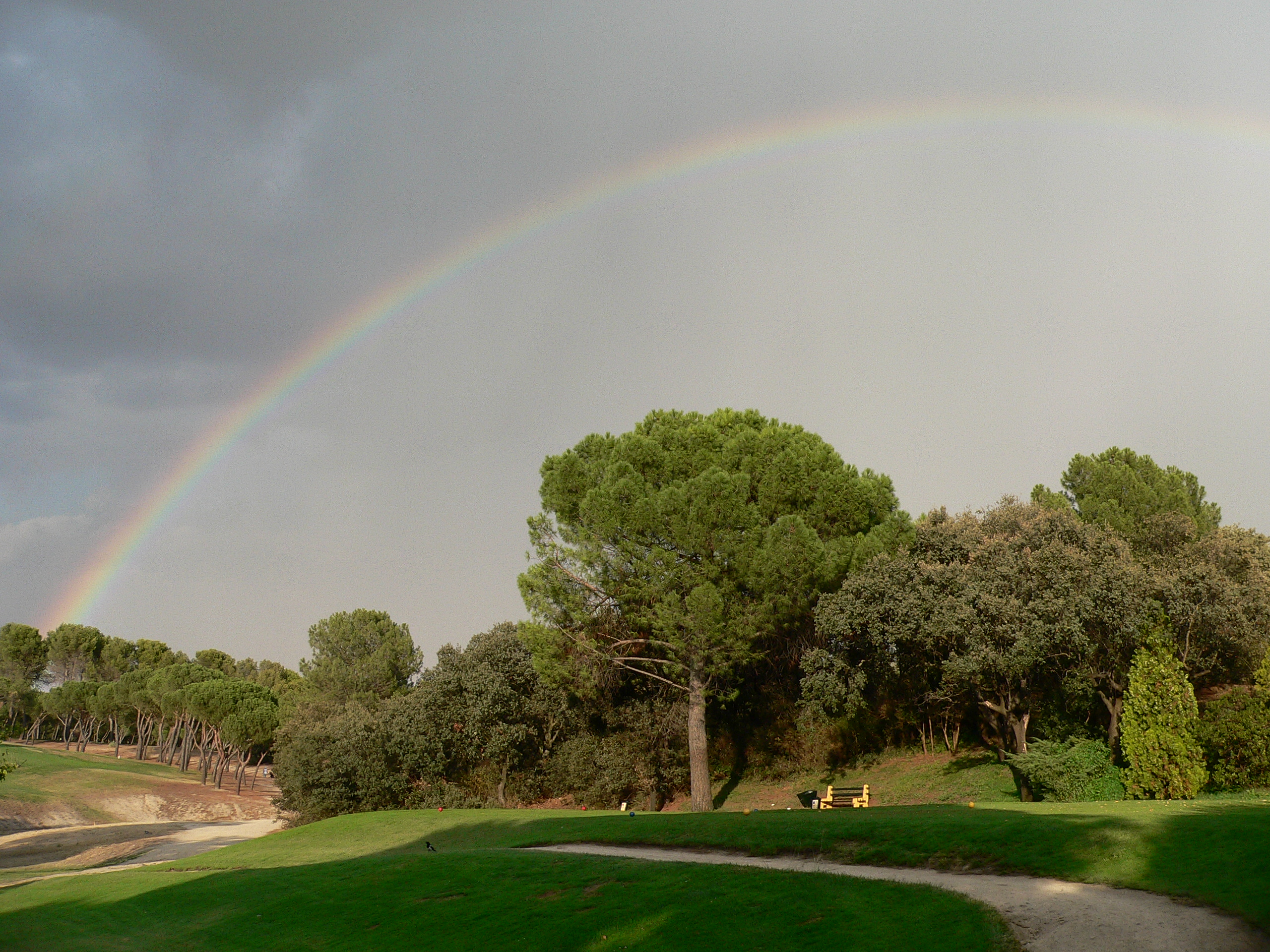
- Course at Puerta de Hierro

Tournament information
- Dates: 23–26 September
- Location: Madrid, Spain
- Course: Real Club de la Puerta de Hierro
- Format: 72 holes stroke play

Statistics
- Par: 72
- Length: 7,043 yards (6,440 m)
- Field: 36 teams 144 players

Champion
- United States; Vinny Giles, Tom Kite, Allen Miller & Lanny Wadkins
- 857 (−7)

The 1970 Eisenhower Trophy took place 23 to 26 September at the Real Club de la Puerta de Hierro in Madrid, Spain. It was the seventh World Amateur Team Championship for the Eisenhower Trophy. The tournament was a 72-hole stroke play team event with 36 four-man teams. The best three scores for each round counted towards the team total.

The United States won the Eisenhower Trophy for the fourth time, finishing 12 strokes ahead of the silver medalists, New Zealand. South Africa took the bronze medal while Australia finished fourth. Victor Regalado from Mexico had the lowest individual score, eight-under-par 280, three strokes better than Dale Hayes from South Africa. Tom Kite was ill on the final day and didn't complete his final round.

== Teams ==
36 four-man teams contested the event.

Country	Players
Argentina	Alberto Barreira, Carlos Bracht, Jorge Ledesma, Roberto Monguzzi
Australia	Kevin Donohoe, Terry Gale, Tony Gresham, Kevin Hartley
Austria	Max Lamberg, Alexander Maculan, Klaus Nierlich, Helmuth Reichel
Belgium	George Boomer, Jaques Moerman, Fredric Rodesch, Philippe Toussaint
Bermuda	Ford Hutchings, Brendam Ingham, Lois Moniz, Keith Pearman
Brazil	José Joaquin Borbosa, Jaime Gonzalez, Lee Smith, Carlos Alfredo Sozio
Canada	Keith Alexander, Gary Cowan, Stu Hamilton, Wayne McDonald
Chile	Guy Barroilhet, Francisco Condon, Mauricio Galeno, Eric van der Valk
Republic of China	Chang Tung-chan, Chen Chien-chin, Ho Ming-chung, Li Chang-hsiung
Colombia	Diego Correa Gomez, Juan Pablo Gutierrez, Emilio Saidi Aparicio, Fernando Arriola Sierra
Denmark	Nils Elsøe Jensen, Klaus Hove, John Jacobsen, Henry Knudsen
Finland	Jalo Grönlund, Juhani Hämäläinen, Harry Safonoff, Kari Salonen
France	Didier Charmat, Hervé Frayssineau, Alexis Godillot, Roger Lagarde
Guatemala	Roberto Cottone, Oscar Escobar, Juan José Hermosilla, Adolfo Rios
Great Britain & Ireland	Michael Bonallack, Rodney Foster, Charlie Green, Geoff Marks
Hong Kong	C.R. Cribben, J.D. Mackie, H.M.P. Miles, Bartie To Jr
Iceland	Johann Benediktsson, Thorarinn B. Jonsson, Torbjörn Kjaerbo, Gunnilugur Ragnarsson
Italy	Stefano Cimatti, Baldovino Dassù, Alberto Schiaffino, Lorenzo Silva
Japan	Tsutomu Irie, Tetsuo Sakata, Nobuo Takahashi, Kenichi Yamada
Mexico	Hector Alvarez, Enrique Farias, Tomás Lehmann, Victor Regalado
Netherlands	Piet-Hein Streutgers, Lout Mangelaar Maertens, Victor Swane, Jaap van Neck
New Zealand	Geoff Clarke, Stuart Jones, Ted McDougall, Ross Murray
Norway	Erik Dønnestad, Yngve Eriksen, Johan Horn, Lars Musæus Jr
Pakistan	Masud Ahmed, Asad I.A. Khan, M.M. Hashim Khan, Mohammed Hassan Musa
Papua New Guinea	John Keating, Ian Trevena, John Wilkinson, James Wu
Peru	Enrique Grau, Felipe Osma, Carlos Rafio, Guillermo Salazar
Philippines	Tommy Manotoc, Miguel Preysler, Luis Silverio, Edmundo Unson
Portugal	Nuno A. De Brito a Cunha, Antonio Carmona Santos, Daniel B. Lane, José Lara de Sousa e Melo
South Africa	Hugh Baiocchi, John Fourie, Dale Hayes, Dave Symons
South Korea	Hang Soo Kim, Sung Long Kim, Yuong Chang Kim, Kyo Won Lee
Spain	José Gancedo, Iván Maura, Eduardo de la Riva Casanueva, Javier Viladomiu
Sweden	Hans Hedjerson, Claes Jöhncke, Magnus Lindberg, Sven Tumba
Switzerland	Thomas Fortmann, Peter Gutermann, Jürg Pesko, Michel Rey
United States	Vinny Giles, Tom Kite, Allen Miller, Lanny Wadkins
Venezuela	Jonathan Coles, Fernan Frias, Gustavo Kalen, Carlos Raza
West Germany	Heini Adam, Walter Bruhne, Peter Jochums, Jan G. Müller

== Scores ==
Place	Country	Score	To par
1st place, gold medalist(s)	United States	213-213-214-217=857	−7
2nd place, silver medalist(s)	New Zealand	220-214-218-217=869	+5
3rd place, bronze medalist(s)	South Africa	214-219-216-221=870	+6
4	Australia	224-215-212-220=871	+7
5	Mexico	221-212-220-220=873	+9
6	Canada	218-216-228-218=880	+16
7	Great Britain & Ireland	222-216-225-219=882	+18
8	Japan	223-222-220-218=883	+19
9	France	226-221-222-217=886	+22
10	Philippines	221-220-223-225=889	+25
11	Chinese Taipei	223-224-222-221=890	+26
12	Spain	224-224-218-226=892	+28
13	Sweden	228-227-224-222=901	+37
14	West Germany	226-224-226-227=903	+39
15	Italy	219-229-233-223=904	+40
T16	Belgium	230-228-224-227=909	+45
T16	Brazil	228-217-231-233=909	+45
18	Argentina	226-236-230-225=917	+53
19	Venezuela	231-229-222-236=918	+54
20	South Korea	228-226-230-235=919	+55
21	Colombia	233-227-233-230=923	+59
22	Switzerland	227-225-238-235=925	+61
T23	Austria	228-239-230-232=929	+65
T23	Norway	233-228-240-228=929	+65
25	Denmark	236-229-227-238=930	+66
26	Bermuda	235-234-235-230=934	+70
27	Netherlands	234-233-237-234=938	+74
28	Portugal	227-238-242-232=939	+75
29	Papua New Guinea	237-227-237-239=940	+76
30	Chile	233-232-240-238=943	+79
31	Hong Kong	242-237-235-241=955	+91
32	Finland	244-243-234-236=957	+93
33	Peru	240-244-247-251=982	+118
34	Pakistan	254-251-253-255=1013	+149
35	Guatemala	264-249-254-250=1017	+153
36	Iceland	262-255-255-276=1048	+184

== Individual leaders ==
There was no official recognition for the lowest individual scores.

Place	Player	Country	Score	To par
1	Victor Regalado	Mexico	72-67-71-70=280	−8
2	Dale Hayes	South Africa	70-71-68-74=283	−5
3	Lanny Wadkins	United States	70-72-72-72=286	−2
T4	Tony Gresham	Australia	71-74-71-71=287	−1
T4	Allen Miller	United States	72-71-71-73=287	−1
6	Ted McDougall	New Zealand	72-73-73-70=288	E
T7	Vinny Giles	United States	73-73-71-72=289	+1
T7	Nobuo Takahashi	Japan	72-74-70-73=289	+1
9	Kenichi Yamada	Japan	73-75-74-68=290	+2
T10	Geoff Clarke	New Zealand	75-71-71-74=291	+3
T10	Ho Ming-chung	Republic of China	72-75-73-71=291	+3
