= Tsutomu Irie =

Japanese golfer

Personal information
- Nationality: Japan
- Born: 6 May 1948 (age 78) Hyōgo Prefecture, Japan
- Height: 1.70 m (5 ft 7 in)
- Weight: 65 kg (143 lb; 10.2 st)

Career
- Sport: Golf
- Status: Professional
- Former tour: Japan Golf Tour
- Professional wins: 3

Number of wins by tour
- Japan Golf Tour: 2

Tsutomu Irie (born 6 May 1948) is a Japanese professional golfer.

== Career ==
Irie played on the Japan Golf Tour, winning twice. In 1985, he became the first player to break the 60 barrier in major professional tournament in Japan when he scored 59 (11 under par) in the first round of the Kuzuha International; he went on the win the two-round tournament.

== Professional wins (3) ==
=== PGA of Japan Tour wins (2) ===
No.	Date	Tournament	Winning score	Margin of victory	Runners-up
1	14 Oct 1979	Tokai Classic	−13 (70-69-68-68=275)	5 strokes	(Taiwan) Hsieh Min-Nan, (Japan) Masaji Kusakabe
2	8 Sep 1985	Kansai Open	−8 (68-71-75-66=280)	3 strokes	(Japan) Hisao Inoue, (Japan) Yoshitaka Yamamoto

=== Other wins (1) ===
- 1985 Kuzuha International

== Team appearances ==
- Eisenhower Trophy (representing Japan): 1970, 1972, 1974
