= Bobby Wadkins =

American professional golfer (born 1951)

Personal information
- Full name: Robert Edwin Wadkins
- Nationality: United States
- Born: July 26, 1951 (age 75) Richmond, Virginia, U.S.
- Height: 6 ft 1 in (1.85 m)
- Weight: 215 lb (98 kg; 15.4 st)

Career
- Sport: Golf
- College: University of Houston; East Tennessee State University
- Turned professional: 1973
- Current tour: Champions Tour
- Former tour: PGA Tour
- Professional wins: 11
- Highest ranking: 33 (September 27, 1987)

Number of wins by tour
- European Tour: 1
- Japan Golf Tour: 2
- PGA Tour Champions: 4
- Other: 4

Best results in major championships
- Masters Tournament: 21st: 1987
- PGA Championship: T7: 1987
- U.S. Open: T4: 1987
- The Open Championship: DNP

Robert Edwin Wadkins (born July 26, 1951) is an American professional golfer.

== Early life and amateur career ==
Wadkins was born in Richmond, Virginia. His brother is Lanny Wadkins, a professional golfer. Between Bobby and Lanny, they held the Richmond, Virginia city junior title for six consecutive years – two by Bobby and four by Lanny. After attending the University of Houston for one year, Wadkins earned All-American honors in 1972–73 at East Tennessee State University.

== Professional career ==
In 1973, Wadkins turned pro. He never won on the PGA Tour despite six runner-up finishes in 715 events, but he did win on the European Tour and the Japan Golf Tour.

Since turning 50, he has played on the Champions Tour and won four times, including one senior major, the 2006 Senior Players Championship. Wadkins is tied with Mark Wiebe as the Champions Tour's youngest winner at the age of 50 years and 10 days when he captured the Lightpath Long Island Classic.

== Amateur wins ==
- 1972 Virginia State Amateur

== Professional wins (10) ==
=== European Tour wins (1) ===
No.	Date	Tournament	Winning score	Margin of victory	Runners-up
1	Oct 22, 1978	European Open Championship	−5 (71-72-72-68=283)	Playoff	(Scotland) Bernard Gallacher, (United States) Gil Morgan

European Tour playoff record (1–0)

No.	Year	Tournament	Opponents	Result
1	1978	European Open Championship	(Scotland) Bernard Gallacher, (United States) Gil Morgan	Won with birdie on first extra hole

=== PGA of Japan Tour Tour wins (2) ===
No.	Date	Tournament	Winning score	Margin of victory	Runner(s)-up
1	Nov 25, 1979	Dunlop Phoenix Tournament	−4 (73-67-71-73=284)	3 strokes	(Taiwan) Lu Liang-Huan, (Japan) Namio Takasu
2	Nov 23, 1986	Dunlop Phoenix Tournament (2)	−11 (69-73-67-68=277)	1 stroke	(Australia) Graham Marsh

=== Other wins (4) ===
- 1981 Virginia PGA Open
- 1982 Virginia PGA Open
- 1983 Virginia PGA Open
- 1990 Fred Meyer Challenge (with Lanny Wadkins)

=== Champions Tour wins (4) ===
Legend
Champions Tour major championships (1)
Other Champions Tour (3)

No.	Date	Tournament	Winning score	Margin of victory	Runner-up
1	Aug 5, 2001	Lightpath Long Island Classic	−14 (65-69-68=202)	1 stroke	(United States) Allen Doyle
2	May 14, 2006	The Boeing Championship at Sandestin	−10 (62-71-70=203)	1 stroke	(United States) Raymond Floyd
3	Jul 16, 2006	Ford Senior Players Championship	−14 (69-72-65-68=274)	1 stroke	(United States) Jim Thorpe
4	Feb 25, 2007	ACE Group Classic	−15 (64-69-68=201)	1 stroke	(United States) Allen Doyle

== Playoff record ==
PGA Tour playoff record (0–2)

No.	Year	Tournament	Opponent	Result
1	1979	IVB-Philadelphia Golf Classic	(United States) Lou Graham	Lost to birdie on first extra hole
2	1985	Sea Pines Heritage	(West Germany) Bernhard Langer	Lost to par on first extra hole

== Results in major championships ==
Tournament	1976	1977	1978	1979
Masters Tournament				
U.S. Open	T35		T46	
PGA Championship			T54	71

Tournament	1980	1981	1982	1983	1984	1985	1986	1987	1988	1989
Masters Tournament		CUT						21	CUT	
U.S. Open	T12	T43	T60	T65		T46	T15	T4	CUT	66
PGA Championship	T59	T67	T49	T27	CUT	WD	T41	T7	T66	CUT

Tournament	1990	1991	1992	1993	1994	1995	1996	1997	1998	1999
Masters Tournament										
U.S. Open	T33	CUT								CUT
PGA Championship	T66	CUT				CUT				

Note: Wadkins never played in The Open Championship.

Top 10
Did not play

CUT = missed the half-way cut
WD = withdrew
"T" = tied

=== Summary ===
Tournament	Wins	2nd	3rd	Top-5	Top-10	Top-25	Events	Cuts made
Masters Tournament	0	0	0	0	0	1	3	1
U.S. Open	0	0	0	1	1	3	14	11
The Open Championship	0	0	0	0	0	0	0	0
PGA Championship	0	0	0	0	1	1	15	10
Totals	0	0	0	1	2	5	32	22

- Most consecutive cuts made – 6 (twice)
- Longest streak of top-10s – 2 (1987 U.S. Open – 1987 PGA)

== Results in The Players Championship ==
Tournament	1975	1976	1977	1978	1979	1980	1981	1982	1983	1984	1985	1986	1987	1988	1989
The Players Championship	T8	CUT	CUT	T12	CUT	CUT	T37	T56	T49	CUT	T64	CUT	CUT	T51	CUT

Tournament	1990	1991	1992	1993	1994	1995	1996	1997	1998	1999	2000	2001	2002	2003	2004	2005	2006	2007
The Players Championship	T36	T9	CUT			T61	T41											CUT

Top 10
Did not play

CUT = missed the halfway cut
"T" indicates a tie for a place

== Senior major championships ==
=== Wins (1) ===
Year	Championship	Winning score	Margin	Runner-up
2006	Ford Senior Players Championship	−14 (69-72-65-68=274)	1 stroke	(United States) Jim Thorpe

=== Results timeline ===
Results not in chronological order before 2017.

Tournament	2002	2003	2004	2005	2006	2007	2008	2009	2010	2011	2012	2013	2014	2015	2016	2017	2018	2019
The Tradition	T13	T52	T24	T49	3	T52	T18	T50	T34	WD	73	T74	77	T77	T72			
Senior PGA Championship	T2	2	T25	CUT	T63	CUT	T53	T49	61	CUT	T51	CUT	T73	CUT				
U.S. Senior Open	T11	T35	CUT	WD	CUT	T29	T37	T47	CUT									
Senior Players Championship	T12	T40	T34	T37	1	T25	T18	73	T52	T37	T60			WD				74
Senior British Open Championship	–	T32						T58										

The Senior British Open was not a senior major until 2003.

Win
Top 10
Did not play

CUT = missed the halfway cut
WD = withdrew
"T" indicates a tie for a place

== See also ==
- 1974 PGA Tour Qualifying School graduates
- 1997 Nike Tour graduates
