= Robert Wrenn (golfer) =

American professional golfer (born 1959)

Personal information
- Full name: Robert Brenaman Wrenn Jr.
- Nationality: United States
- Born: September 11, 1959 (age 67) Richmond, Virginia, U.S.
- Height: 5 ft 10 in (1.78 m)
- Weight: 170 lb (77 kg; 12 st)

Career
- Sport: Golf
- College: Wake Forest University
- Turned professional: 1981
- Former tour: PGA Tour
- Professional wins: 5
- Highest ranking: 86 (July 2, 1989)

Number of wins by tour
- PGA Tour: 1
- Other: 4

Best results in major championships
- Masters Tournament: T25: 1988
- PGA Championship: T40: 1987
- U.S. Open: T26: 1989
- The Open Championship: DNP

Robert Brenaman Wrenn Jr. (born September 11, 1959) is an American professional golfer. He has also worked as a sportscaster and golf course design consultant.

== Early life ==
Wrenn was born in Richmond, Virginia. He attended Wake Forest University in Winston-Salem, North Carolina, and was an all-ACC member of the golf team in each of his four years from 1978–1981.

== Professional career ==
In 1981, Wrenn turned professional. He played in 308 PGA Tour events between 1982 and 1998 with 15 top-10 finishes including a victory at the 1987 Buick Open. He established the tournament record of 262 (26-under-par), which still stands. In fact, at the time this was only one stroke off the all-time PGA Tour record in a 72-hole tournament. His best finish in a major was T-25 at The Masters in 1988. Toward the end of his playing career, Wrenn played some on the Nationwide Tour. His best two finishes in that venue, both in 1995, were a T-2 at the NIKE South Carolina Classic and a T-3 at the NIKE Tri-Cities Open.

== Amateur wins ==
- 1981 Trans-Mississippi Amateur

== Professional wins (5) ==
=== PGA Tour wins (1) ===
No.	Date	Tournament	Winning score	Margin of victory	Runner-up
1	Jul 26, 1987	Buick Open	−26 (65-63-67-67=262)	7 strokes	(United States) Dan Pohl

PGA Tour playoff record (0–1)Random article[clarification needed]

No.	Year	Tournament	Opponent	Result
1	1989	Las Vegas Invitational	(United States) Scott Hoch	Lost to birdie on fifth extra hole

=== Asia Golf Circuit wins (1) ===
No.	Date	Tournament	Winning score	Margin of victory	Runner-up
1	Mar 20, 1983	Indonesia Open	−6 (69-63-71-71=274)	4 strokes	(Philippines) Paterno Braza

=== Other wins (3) ===
- 1983 Virginia Open
- 1989 Virginia Open
- 1991 Virginia Open

== Results in major championships ==
Tournament	1987	1988	1989	1990	1991	1992	1993
Masters Tournament		T25					
U.S. Open	CUT		T26				87
PGA Championship	T40	T52	CUT				

Note: Wrenn never played in The Open Championship

Did not play

CUT = missed the half-way cut
"T" = tied

== See also ==
- 1984 PGA Tour Qualifying School graduates
- 1985 PGA Tour Qualifying School graduates
- 1986 PGA Tour Qualifying School graduates
- 1995 PGA Tour Qualifying School graduates
