= Kuzuha, Hirakata, Osaka =

District of Osaka, Japan

Coordinates: 34°51′45″N 135°40′35″E

Kuzuha (樟葉) is a district of north Hirakata, Osaka, in Japan. It is located approximately 23 minutes by train from Sanjō Keihan Station in Kyoto and approximately 31 minutes from Yodoyabashi Station in Osaka.

Since 2004, Kuzuha has seen substantial redevelopment in the immediate station vicinity. This has been through investment by the Keihan company, and because of its prime location as a commuter town. The station itself is yet to receive any major redevelopment.

== Buildings ==
Kuzuha's most notable draw is its shopping mall, Kuzuha Mall. Originally built in 1972 in front of the station, it was a two-story open-air mall with a former JNR Class D51 steam locomotive at its centre. The mall was rebuilt in 2005, opening on April 14, 2005, and the locomotive was moved to Torokko Saga Station in Kyoto. The new Kuzuha Mall consists of multiple buildings, with a separate building for the Kuzuha Mall Kids and Uniqlo (and other stores above), along with the main three-story covered mall. Inside are modern shops, a department store, bakery, small art gallery and a two-storey cluster of restaurants in the 'Dining St.' food court.

Its most obvious landmark building is Kuzuha Tower City, built in 2004. Kuzuha Tower City consists of four residential towers, the tallest being 41 storeys and a height of 138.6 m. There is also a fourth four-storey fitness tower. At the time of its construction it was the highest known base isolation condominium in the world.

== Kuzuha Public Golf Course ==
Kuzuha Public Golf Course was established in 1957, and is an 18-hole par 70 course. Between 1965 and 1990 the golf course held over 26 international professional tournaments, and still holds regular national competitions.

Its close proximity to Yodo River has led to problems with flooding since 1963.

== Local area ==
Along the northern edge of Kuzuha is the bamboo forest of Mount Otokoyama in neighbouring Yawata, Kyoto. It was the bamboo from this forest that Thomas Edison (1847–1931) used as filament in his first electric light bulbs. There is a monument to Edison at the Iwashimizu Hachiman Shrine, also located on the mountain.

The Shinto shrine of Iwashimizu Hachiman-gū is notable in itself, being one of the three great Hachiman shrines of Japan. Founded in 859, the present main shrine was built in 1634, by the third Tokugawa shōgun, Tokugawa Iemitsu.
