= Virginia Open =

Golf tournament in Virginia, U.S.

The Virginia Open is the Virginia state open golf tournament, open to both amateur and professional golfers. It is organized by the Virginia State Golf Association and the Middle Atlantic section of the PGA of America. It has been played annually since 1924 (except for war years) at a variety of courses around the state. From 1958 to 1984, both organizations held an Open, with the one sponsored by the PGA generally known as the Virginia PGA Open. The tournament was considered a PGA Tour event in at least 1936 and 1946.

== Winners ==
Merged
2026	Mark Lawrence Jr.
2025	Larkin Gross
2024	Logan Reilly (a)
2023	Connor Burgess
2022	Nick Taliaferro (a)
2021	Evan Beck (a)
2020	Mark Lawrence Jr. (a)
2019	Jack Montague (a)
2018	Fielding Brewbaker
2017	Ryan Zylstra
2016	Jay Woodson
2015	Lanto Griffin
2014	Jay Woodson
2013	Jay Woodson
2012	Jay Woodson
2011	Roger Newsom
2010	Evan Beck (a)
2009	Faber Jamerson
2008	Roger Newsom (a)
2007	Joshua Meador
2006	Faber Jamerson
2005	Ted Brown
2004	Spence Andrews (a)
2003	Jon Corliss
2002	Keith Decker (a)
2001	Keith Decker (a)
2000	Billy Judah
1999	Faber Jamerson (a)
1998	Rick Schuller
1997	Jerry Wood
1996	Keith Decker (a)
1995	Rob McNamara
1994	Jerry Wood
1993	Vinny Giles (a)
1992	Craig Gunn
1991	Robert Wrenn
1990	Bruce Lenhard
1989	Robert Wrenn
1988	Woody FitzHugh
1987	Tim White
1986	Woody FitzHugh
1985	Tom McKnight (a)

	VSGA	MA-PGA
1984	Mark Carnevale	Woody FitzHugh
1983	Robert Wrenn	Bobby Wadkins
1982	Bill Sibbick (a)	Bobby Wadkins
1981	Tony DeLuca (a)	Bobby Wadkins
1980	Clem King	Billy King
1979	Stephen Smith (a)	Tony DeLuca (a)
1978	Robert Black, Jr. (a)	Bobby Inman (a)
1977	Bob Post	John Bruce (a)
1976	Mike Pratt (a)	John Bruce (a)
1975	Chip Heyl (a)	John Bruce (a)
1974	Vinny Giles (a)	John Bruce (a)
1973	Bruce Lenhard	Herbert Hooper
1972	Jennings House	Nelson Long, Jr.
1971	Lanny Wadkins	Claude King
1970	Rick Bendall (a)	Chandler Harper
1969	Vinny Giles (a)	Chandler Harper
1968	Chandler Harper	Chandler Harper
1967	Tom Strange	Chandler Harper
1966	Herbert Hooper	Tom Strange
1965	Bobby Mitchell	Bobby Mitchell
1964	Herbert Hooper	Tom Strange
1963	Claude King	Tom Strange
1962	Claude King	Mac Main
1961	Claude King	Jack Isaacs
1960	Al Smith	Chandler Harper
1959	Joe Cannon	Al Smith
1958	Al Smith	Jack Isaacs

Merged
1957	Tom Strange (a)
1956	Jack Isaacs
1955	Johnny O'Donnell
1954	Johnny O'Donnell
1953	Johnny O'Donnell
1952	Chandler Harper
1951	Johnny O'Donnell
1950	Jack Isaacs
1949	Jack Isaacs
1948	Johnny O'Donnell
1947	George Payton
1946	Sam Snead
1942–45	No tournament
1941	Chandler Harper
1940	Chandler Harper
1939	Bobby Cruickshank
1938	Chandler Harper
1937	Bobby Cruickshank
1936	Bobby Cruickshank
1935	Bobby Cruickshank
1934	Bobby Cruickshank
1933	Bobby Cruickshank
1932	Chandler Harper (a)
1931	Buddy Clement (a)
1930	Harry Thompson (a)
1929	Roland Hancock
1928	Charlie Isaacs
1927	Jimmy Thomson
1926	Pat Petranck
1925	Pat Petranck
1924	Elmer Loving
