= Jay Monahan =

PGA Tour commissioner (born 1970)

4th Commissioner of the PGA Tour
- Incumbent
- Assumed office January 1, 2017
- Preceded by: Tim Finchem

Personal details
- Born: Joseph William Monahan IV; May 7, 1970 (age 56) Belmont, Massachusetts, U.S.
- Spouse: Susan Monahan
- Children: 2 daughters
- Education: Trinity College, Connecticut (BA); University of Massachusetts, Amherst (MS)

Joseph William "Jay" Monahan IV (born May 7, 1970) is the fourth and current commissioner of golf's PGA Tour. He ascended to this position in January 2017, succeeding Tim Finchem (who was the PGA Tour's third commissioner from 1994 to 2017). Monahan previously served as executive director of The Players Championship.

== Early years ==
Monahan was born and raised in Belmont, Massachusetts, a suburb northwest of Boston. Following graduation from Belmont Hill School, he did a post-graduate year at Lawrenceville School in New Jersey.

Monahan was immersed in the sport of golf as a child and went on to play Division III golf and hockey at Trinity College in Hartford, Connecticut, where he was an Academic All-American in his senior season under golf coach Bill Detrick. He graduated with a history degree in 1993 and then earned a master's degree in sports management from the University of Massachusetts Amherst in 1995.

== Early career ==
Monahan worked at IMG Worldwide where he played an integral role in the development of the Deutsche Bank Championship at TPC Boston in Norton, and served as the tournament’s first director at age 32. In 2003, Monahan co-created Golf Fights Cancer, a charity that has raised nearly $5 million for cancer research. Later, he worked in sales for the Fenway Sports Group (FSG) in Boston.

== PGA Tour ==
In June 2008, Monahan came to the PGA Tour as the executive director of The Players Championship, and was named the Tour’s Senior Vice President for Business Development in 2010. He was promoted to Executive Vice President and Chief Marketing Officer in March 2013, overseeing business development, corporate marketing and partnerships, title sponsor relations, retail licensing, and media sales.

Monahan served as Deputy Commissioner for two years and then became the Chief Operating Officer. PGA Tour commissioner Tim Finchem announced his retirement in 2016 on November 7, and Monahan officially took over as commissioner two months later in January 2017.

In February 2022, Monahan received a letter from Saudi Arabian Public Investment Fund (PIF) financed LIV Golf's CEO Greg Norman. The letter detailed how players "were and still are interested in playing for a new league, in addition to the PGA Tour." Norman stated that he wanted the leagues to co-exist, to which Monahan responded that he "doesn't want that at all." After the creation and completion of several LIV Golf events, the Department of Justice launched an investigation into potential monopolization and anticompetitive behavior on behalf of the PGA Tour.

Having leaned heavily into the undesirable nature of LIV Golf's financiers to see off the perceived threat of LIV Golf, Monahan controversially came to an agreement with the Public Investment Fund (or the PIF). The fund is accused of "sportswashing" to divert the focus from the crimes committed by the regime led by Mohammed bin Salman (the Crown Prince of Saudi Arabia), who became the target of criticism from both PGA Tour players and the families of the 9/11 victims.

== Personal ==
Monahan and his wife Susan have two daughters; they reside in Ponte Vedra Beach, Florida, near PGA Tour headquarters and home of The Players Championship at TPC Sawgrass.
