= Lanny Wadkins =

American professional golfer (born 1949)

Personal information
- Full name: Jerry Lanston Wadkins Jr.
- Nickname: Lanny
- Nationality: United States
- Born: December 5, 1949 (age 76) Richmond, Virginia, U.S.
- Height: 5 ft 9 in (1.75 m)
- Weight: 175 lb (79 kg; 12.5 st)
- Spouse: Penelope
- Children: 3

Career
- Sport: Golf
- College: Wake Forest University
- Turned professional: 1971
- Former tours: PGA Tour; Champions Tour
- Professional wins: 33
- Highest ranking: 5 (March 1, 1987)

Number of wins by tour
- PGA Tour: 21
- European Tour: 1
- Japan Golf Tour: 1
- PGA Tour of Australasia: 1
- PGA Tour Champions: 1
- Other: 8

Best results in major championships (wins: 1)
- Masters Tournament: T3: 1990, 1991, 1993
- PGA Championship: Won: 1977
- U.S. Open: T2: 1986
- The Open Championship: T4: 1984

Achievements and awards
- World Golf Hall of Fame: 2009 (member page)
- PGA Player of the Year: 1985

Jerry Lanston "Lanny" Wadkins Jr. (born December 5, 1949) is an American professional golfer. He won 21 tournaments on the PGA Tour, including one major, the 1977 PGA Championship. He ranked in the top 10 of the Official World Golf Ranking for 86 weeks from the ranking's debut in 1986 to 1988.

== Early life and amateur career ==
Wadkins was born in Richmond, Virginia. He has a younger brother, Bobby Wadkins, who also became a professional golfer. Wadkins attended Meadowbrook High School in Chesterfield County.

After high school, he attended Wake Forest University on an Arnold Palmer golf scholarship. He joined Kappa Sigma fraternity at Wake Forest. He won the 1970 U.S. Amateur by one stroke over Tom Kite, when the tournament was played as stroke play.

== Professional career ==
In 1971, Wadkins turned professional. In the summer he won the Greater Bangor Open in Maine for his first professional victory. His first win on the PGA Tour came at the Sahara Invitational in Las Vegas in October 1972 where he finished one stroke ahead of runner-up Palmer, his scholarship benefactor. Wadkins was later voted Rookie of the Year on the tour in 1972. Two more wins followed in 1973 before his form dipped for three years. He bounced back to win his sole major title at the 1977 PGA Championship. He prevailed on the third hole of a sudden-death playoff at Pebble Beach against Gene Littler. It was the first time the sudden-death format was used in a stroke-play major championship.

Wadkins was runner-up in four subsequent majors (U.S. Open in 1986, PGA Championship in 1982, 1984, 1987) and finished third in the Masters three times (1990, 1991, 1993). At The Open Championship his best finish was fourth at St. Andrews in 1984.

On the PGA Tour, Wadkins won 1979 Tournament Players Championship and was voted PGA Player of the Year in 1985. Over his career, he picked up a win more seasons than not until 1992 when he achieved his twenty-first and final PGA Tour victory at the Canon Greater Hartford Open.

Like many star American golfers Wadkins was invited to play in a number of international tournaments. He won the 1978 Victorian PGA Championship on the PGA Tour of Australia and the 1979 Bridgestone Open on the Japan Golf Tour. He also finished runner-up at the 1979 German Open, 1980 Air New Zealand Shell Open, and 1990 Austrian Open. He also won significant events in South America and Canada.

Wadkins played for the United States in the Ryder Cup eight times between 1977 and 1993. Wadkins collected 21 1/2 points during his Ryder Cup career, one of the very best records on either side in the history of the competition. He also captained the team in 1995 at Oak Hill Country Club.

=== Senior career ===
Wadkins began play on the Champions Tour in 2000, and picked up a win in his first event at the ACE Group Classic in a four-way playoff. As a senior, he divided his time between competition and broadcasting work and did not become a regular winner at the senior level.

Following the retirement of Ken Venturi in June 2002, Wadkins was the lead golf analyst for CBS Sports for over four years, until he was replaced by Nick Faldo after the 2006 season. Later, he was the lead analyst for the Champions Tour on Golf Channel for 13 years until he retired in January 2025, and was succeeded by Paul Azinger.

== Honors ==
- In 1972, Wadkins was voted Rookie of the Year for the PGA Tour
- In 1985, Wadkins was named PGA Player of the Year
- In 2009, Wadkins was elected to the World Golf Hall of Fame

== Personal life ==
Lanny is married to Penelope Wadkins and they have three children: Jessica, Travis, and Tucker. Travis played on the Wake Forest University golf team 2006–2010. Tucker played on the University of Arizona golf team from 2011–2015. In 2011, Travis played on the eGolf Tour and made it to the final stage of the PGA Tour's Qualifying School but failed to earn a card.

A nephew, Ron Whittaker, is a professional golfer on the second-tier Web.com Tour with 77 PGA Tour starts.

== Amateur wins ==
- 1968 Southern Amateur
- 1969 Eastern Amateur
- 1970 U.S. Amateur, Southern Amateur, Western Amateur

== Professional wins (33) ==
=== PGA Tour wins (21) ===
Legend
Major championships (1)
Players Championships (1)
Other PGA Tour (19)

No.	Date	Tournament	Winning score	To par	Margin of victory	Runner(s)-up
1	Oct 29, 1972	Sahara Invitational	65-69-70-69=273	−11	1 stroke	(United States) Arnold Palmer
2	Apr 29, 1973	Byron Nelson Golf Classic	71-68-71-67=277	−3	Playoff	(United States) Dan Sikes
3	Aug 19, 1973	USI Classic	71-69-70-69=279	−9	2 strokes	(United States) Lee Elder, (United States) Tom Jenkins, (United States) Rik Massengale
4	Aug 14, 1977	PGA Championship	69-71-72-70=282	−6	Playoff	(United States) Gene Littler
5	Sep 5, 1977	World Series of Golf	69-66-67-65=267	−13	5 strokes	(United States) Hale Irwin, (United States) Tom Weiskopf
6	Feb 25, 1979	Glen Campbell-Los Angeles Open	66-72-69-69=276	−8	1 stroke	(United States) Lon Hinkle
7	Mar 25, 1979	Tournament Players Championship	67-68-76-72=283	−5	5 strokes	(United States) Tom Watson
8	Jan 25, 1982	Phoenix Open	65-70-63-65=263	−21	6 strokes	(United States) Jerry Pate
9	Apr 18, 1982	MONY Tournament of Champions	67-72-68-73=280	−8	3 strokes	(United States) Andy Bean, (Australia) David Graham, (United States) Craig Stadler, (United States) Ron Streck
10	Aug 22, 1982	Buick Open	66-71-71-65=273	−15	1 stroke	(United States) Tom Kite
11	Apr 3, 1983	Greater Greensboro Open	72-69-67-67=275	−13	5 strokes	(United States) Craig Stadler, (Zimbabwe) Denis Watson
12	Apr 24, 1983	MONY Tournament of Champions (2)	67-70-71-72=280	−8	1 stroke	(United States) Raymond Floyd
13	Jan 13, 1985	Bob Hope Classic	67-67-68-66-65=333	−27	Playoff	(United States) Craig Stadler
14	Jan 27, 1985	Los Angeles Open (2)	63-70-67-64=264	−20	7 strokes	(United States) Hal Sutton
15	Oct 13, 1985	Walt Disney World/Oldsmobile Classic	68-67-69-63=267	−21	1 stroke	(United States) Mike Donald, (United States) Scott Hoch
16	Mar 1, 1987	Doral-Ryder Open	75-66-66-70=277	−11	3 strokes	(Spain) Seve Ballesteros, (United States) Tom Kite, (United States) Don Pooley
17	Feb 14, 1988	Hawaiian Open	68-71-66-66=271	−17	1 stroke	(Canada) Richard Zokol
18	May 22, 1988	Colonial National Invitation	67-68-70-65=270	−10	1 stroke	(United States) Mark Calcavecchia, (United States) Ben Crenshaw, (United States) Joey Sindelar
19	Jul 8, 1990	Anheuser-Busch Golf Classic	65-66-67-68=266	−18	5 strokes	(United States) Larry Mize
20	Jan 20, 1991	United Hawaiian Open (2)	69-67-69-65=270	−18	4 strokes	(United States) John Cook
21	Aug 2, 1992	Canon Greater Hartford Open	68-70-71-65=274	−6	2 strokes	(United States) Dan Forsman, (United States) Donnie Hammond, (Zimbabwe) Nick Price

PGA Tour playoff record (3–3)

No.	Year	Tournament	Opponent(s)	Result
1	1972	Phoenix Open	(United States) Homero Blancas	Lost to birdie on first extra hole
2	1973	Byron Nelson Golf Classic	(United States) Dan Sikes	Won with par on first extra hole
3	1977	PGA Championship	(United States) Gene Littler	Won with par on third extra hole
4	1983	Joe Garagiola-Tucson Open	(United States) Gil Morgan, (United States) Curtis Strange	Morgan won with birdie on second extra hole
5	1985	Bob Hope Classic	(United States) Craig Stadler	Won with birdie on fifth extra hole
6	1987	PGA Championship	(United States) Larry Nelson	Lost to par on first extra hole

=== European Tour wins (1) ===
Legend
Major championships (1)
Other European Tour (0)

No.	Date	Tournament	Winning score	To par	Margin of victory	Runner-up
1	Aug 14, 1977	PGA Championship	69-71-72-70=282	−6	Playoff	(United States) Gene Littler

European Tour playoff record (1–2)

No.	Year	Tournament	Opponent	Result
1	1977	PGA Championship	(United States) Gene Littler	Won with par on third extra hole
2	1987	PGA Championship	(United States) Larry Nelson	Lost to par on first extra hole
3	1990	Austrian Open	(Germany) Bernhard Langer	Lost to birdie on third extra hole

=== PGA of Japan Tour wins (1) ===
No.	Date	Tournament	Winning score	To par	Margin of victory	Runner-up
1	Oct 28, 1979	Bridgestone Tournament	66-71-69-71=277	−11	1 stroke	(Japan) Yoshikazu Yokoshima

=== PGA Tour of Australasia wins (1) ===
No.	Date	Tournament	Winning score	To par	Margin of victory	Runner-up
1	Oct 22, 1978	Garden State Victorian PGA Championship	75-68-69-69=281	−7	3 strokes	(Australia) Bob Shearer

=== Other wins (9) ===
- 1971 Virginia Open, Greater Bangor Open
- 1978 Labatt's International Golf Classic
- 1980 PGA Grand Slam of Golf (United States - unofficial event)
- 1981 Caribbean Open (Colombia)
- 1984 World Nissan Championship (Japan)
- 1990 Fred Meyer Challenge (with Bobby Wadkins)
- 1991 Shark Shootout (with Tom Purtzer)
- 2015 PNC Father Son Challenge (with son Tucker)

=== Senior PGA Tour wins (1) ===
No.	Date	Tournament	Winning score	To par	Margin of victory	Runners-up
1	Feb 13, 2000	ACE Group Classic	67-68-67=202	−14	Playoff	(Spain) José María Cañizares, (United States) Walter Hall, (United States) Tom Watson

Senior PGA Tour playoff record (1–0)

No.	Year	Tournament	Opponents	Result
1	2000	ACE Group Classic	(Spain) José María Cañizares, (United States) Walter Hall, (United States) Tom Watson	Won with par on third extra hole Hall and Watson eliminated by par on first hole

== Major championships ==
=== Wins (1) ===
Year	Championship	54 holes	Winning score	Margin	Runner-up
1977	PGA Championship	6 shot deficit	−6 (69-71-72-70=282)	Playoff^{1}	(United States) Gene Littler

^{1}Defeated Littler with a par on the third extra hole.

=== Results timeline ===
Tournament	1970	1971	1972	1973	1974	1975	1976	1977	1978	1979
Masters Tournament	CUT	CUT	T19	T29	CUT				T18	T7
U.S. Open		T13	T25	T7	T26	T38			CUT	T19
The Open Championship				T7	T22	CUT			CUT	
PGA Championship			T16	T3	CUT		CUT	1	T34	70

Tournament	1980	1981	1982	1983	1984	1985	1986	1987	1988	1989
Masters Tournament	CUT	T21	T33	T8	CUT	T18	T31	T12	T11	T26
U.S. Open	CUT	T14	T6	7	T11	T5	T2	T36	T12	CUT
The Open Championship				T29	T4	CUT		T29	T34	T26
PGA Championship	T30	T33	2	CUT	T2	T10	T11	2	T25	CUT

Tournament	1990	1991	1992	1993	1994	1995	1996	1997	1998	1999
Masters Tournament	T3	T3	T48	T3	T18	CUT				
U.S. Open	T51	T63	CUT							
The Open Championship	CUT	T73	T45	CUT						
PGA Championship	CUT	T43	T40	T14	T61	T63	CUT	T58		T34

Tournament	2000	2001
Masters Tournament		
U.S. Open		
The Open Championship		
PGA Championship	CUT	CUT

Win
Top 10
Did not play

CUT = missed the halfway cut (3rd round cut in 1985 Open Championship)
"T" indicates a tie for a place.

=== Summary ===
Tournament	Wins	2nd	3rd	Top-5	Top-10	Top-25	Events	Cuts made
Masters Tournament	0	0	3	3	5	12	23	17
U.S. Open	0	1	0	2	5	11	20	16
The Open Championship	0	0	0	1	2	3	14	9
PGA Championship	1	3	1	5	6	10	28	20
Totals	1	4	4	11	18	36	85	62

- Most consecutive cuts made – 13 (1985 PGA – 1989 Masters)
- Longest streak of top-10s – 3 (twice)

== The Players Championship ==
=== Wins (1) ===
Year	Championship	54 holes	Winning score	Margin	Runner-up
1979	Tournament Players Championship	3 shot lead	−5 (67-68-76-72=283)	5 strokes	(United States) Tom Watson

=== Results timeline ===
Tournament	1975	1976	1977	1978	1979	1980	1981	1982	1983	1984	1985	1986	1987	1988	1989	1990	1991	1992	1993	1994	1995	1996
The Players Championship	WD	T65	T34	CUT	1	T45	CUT	CUT	CUT	T5	CUT	T40	CUT	T6	T41	CUT	62	T29	CUT	CUT	CUT	CUT

Win
Top 10

CUT = missed the halfway cut
WD = withdrew
"T" indicates a tie for a place.

== U.S. national team appearances ==
Amateur

- Walker Cup: 1969 (winners), 1971
- Eisenhower Trophy: 1970 (winners)

Professional

- Ryder Cup: 1977 (winners), 1979 (winners), 1983 (winners), 1985, 1987, 1989 (tie), 1991 (winners), 1993 (winners), 1995 (captain)
- World Cup: 1977, 1984, 1985
- Dunhill Cup: 1986
- Four Tours World Championship: 1985 (winners), 1987 (winners), 1991
- US v Japan: 1982, 1983

== See also ==
- 1971 PGA Tour Qualifying School graduates
- List of golfers with most PGA Tour wins
- List of men's major championships winning golfers
