= Kenichi Yamada =

Japanese golfer

Personal information
- Nationality: Japan
- Born: 24 March 1947 (age 79) Tokyo, Japan
- Height: 1.74 m (5 ft 9 in)
- Weight: 77 kg (170 lb; 12.1 st)

Career
- Sport: Golf
- Status: Professional
- Former tour: Japan Golf Tour
- Professional wins: 2

Number of wins by tour
- Japan Golf Tour: 2

Kenichi Yamada (山田 健一, Yamada Ken'ichi; born 24 March 1947) is a Japanese professional golfer.

== Professional career ==
Yamada played on the Japan Golf Tour, winning twice.

== Professional wins (2) ==
=== PGA of Japan Tour wins (2) ===
No.	Date	Tournament	Winning score	Margin of victory	Runner(s)-up
1	5 Oct 1975	Golf Digest Tournament	−12 (67-73-67-33=240) (Note: Shortened to 63 holes due to Typhoon Cora.)	1 stroke	(Japan) Shozo Miyamoto
2	27 Aug 1978	KBC Augusta	−12 (68-67-71-70=276)	2 strokes	(Japan) Isao Aoki, (Japan) Shiro Kubo, (United States) Gene Littler, (Japan) Yasuhiro Miyamoto

== Team appearances ==
Amateur

- Eisenhower Trophy (representing Japan): 1968, 1970
