= Tim Finchem =

American lawyer

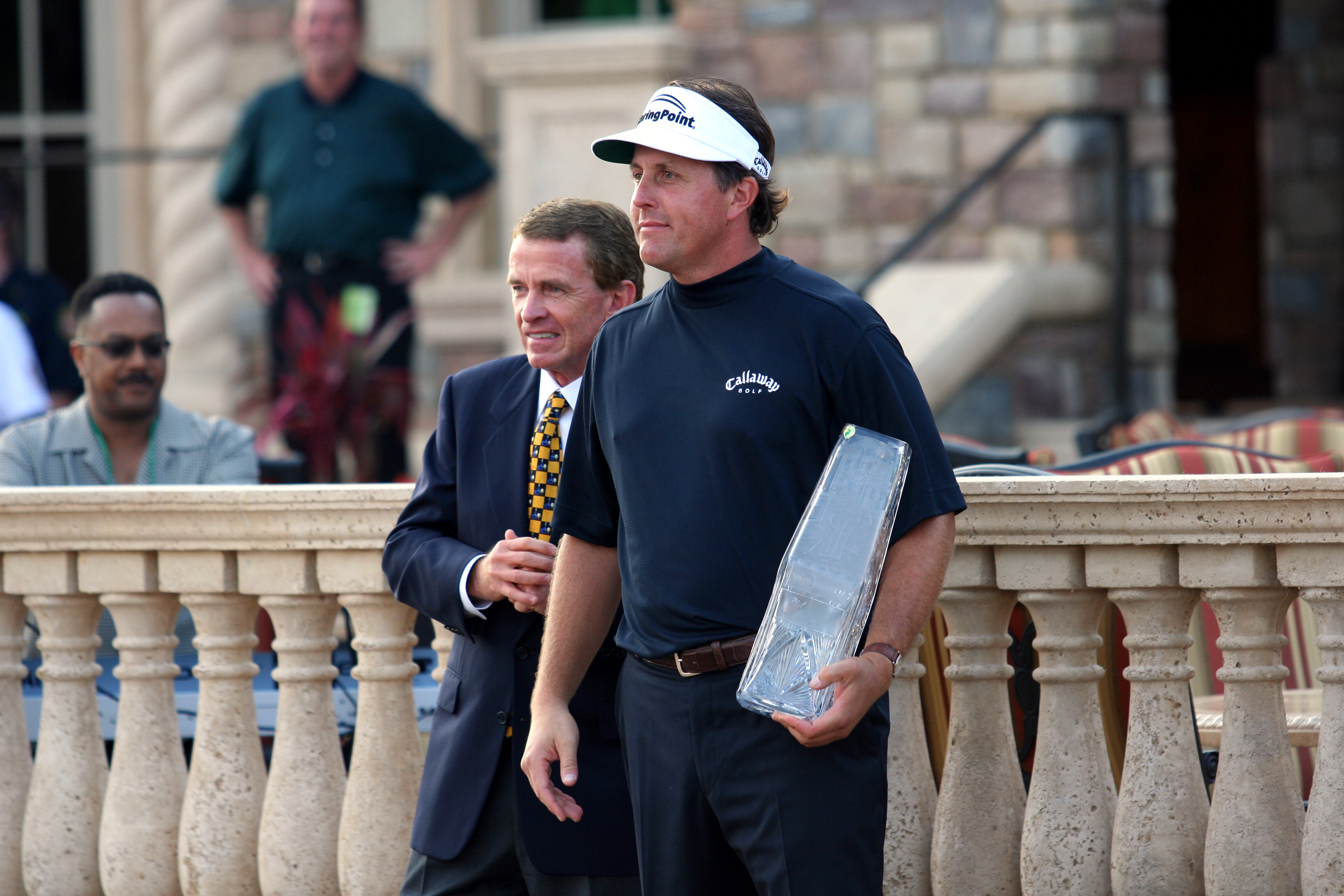
- Finchem (left) with Phil Mickelson at The Players Championship awards ceremony

3rd Commissioner of the PGA Tour
- In office June 1, 1994 – January 1, 2017
- Preceded by: Deane Beman
- Succeeded by: Jay Monahan

Personal details
- Born: April 19, 1947 (age 79) Ottawa, Illinois, U.S.
- Education: University of Richmond (B.A.); University of Virginia (J.D.)
- Occupation: Former PGA Tour commissioner

Timothy W. Finchem (born April 19, 1947) is an American lawyer and retired golf administrator, who served as commissioner of golf's PGA Tour from 1994 to 2016. He served in the White House for two years during the administration of President Jimmy Carter, from 1978 to 1979. He was inducted into the World Golf Hall of Fame in 2021.

== Early life and education ==
Finchem was born in Ottawa, Illinois. He graduated from Princess Anne High School in Virginia Beach, Virginia. He attended the University of Richmond on a debate scholarship, receiving his Bachelor of Arts degree in 1969. While at Richmond, Finchem was a member of the Phi Gamma Delta Rho Chi chapter. Finchem later graduated from the University of Virginia School of Law in 1973. While at UVA, Finchem was a member of the Kappa Alpha, Lambda chapter.

== Early career ==
After practicing law in Virginia Beach for three years, Finchem served in the White House during the administration of Jimmy Carter as Deputy Advisor to the President in the Office of Economic Affairs in 1978 and 1979. In the early 1980s, Finchem co-founded the National Marketing and Strategies Group in Washington, D.C.

== PGA Tour Commissioner ==
Finchem took the position of Commissioner on June 1, 1994, succeeding Deane Beman, who retired after nearly 20 years in the post. Finchem had previously served as Vice President of Business Affairs, Deputy Commissioner, and Chief Operating Officer of the Tour.

Finchem was succeeded by Jay Monahan in January 2017.

On March 12, 2025, in conjunction with The Players Championship, Monahan presented Finchem with the Tour's Lifetime Achievement Award, making him the 14th recipient of that honor. That same night, the Tour unveiled the Commissioner Tim Finchem Library, located inside the TPC Sawgrass clubhouse.

Preceded by Deane Beman	Commissioner of the PGA Tour; 1994–2016	Succeeded by Jay Monahan
