= PGA Tour =

Golf tour in the United States

- Current season, competition or edition: 2026 PGA Tour
- Formerly: TPA Tour
- Sport: Golf
- Founded: December 2, 1929 (split from PGA in 1968)
- CEO: Brian Rolapp
- Commissioner: Jay Monahan
- Country: Based in the United States (Note: Schedules have included events in Puerto Rico, as well as internationally in Australia, the Bahamas, Bermuda, Canada, China, Cuba, Dominican Republic, England, Ireland, Japan, Malaysia, Mexico, Northern Ireland, Scotland, South Korea, Spain and Venezuela.)
- Most titles: Money list titles: (United States) Tiger Woods (10); Tournament wins: (United States) Sam Snead (82) (United States) Tiger Woods (82)
- Broadcasters: CBS/CBSSN/Paramount+ NBC/NBCSN/Peacock; Golf Channel; ABC/ESPN/ESPN DTC; Sky Sports (UK & Ireland); HBO Max/Discovery+ (outside US); JTBC Sports (South Korea)
- Related competitions: Korn Ferry Tour; PGA Tour Americas; PGA Tour Champions; PGA Tour Canada (Note: Ceased in 2023; merged to form PGA Tour Americas.); PGA Tour China (Note: Ceased 2020.); PGA Tour Latinoamérica
- Website: pgatour.com

The PGA Tour (stylized as PGA TOUR by its officials) is an organizer of professional golf tours in North America. It organizes most (Note: Notably, the PGA Tour does not organize any of the four men's major golf championships.) of the events on the flagship annual series of tournaments also known as the PGA Tour, the PGA Tour Champions (age 50 and older), the Korn Ferry Tour (for professional players who have not yet qualified to play on the PGA Tour), and PGA Tour Americas. The PGA Tour is a nonprofit organization headquartered in Ponte Vedra Beach, Florida, a suburb southeast of Jacksonville.

Originally established by the Professional Golfers' Association of America (PGA of America), it was spun off in December 1968 into a separate organization for tour players, as opposed to club professionals, the focal members of today's PGA of America. Originally the "Tournament Players Division", it adopted the name "PGA Tour" in 1975 and runs most of the week-to-week professional golf events on the tournament known as the PGA Tour, including The Players Championship, hosted at TPC Sawgrass; the FedEx Cup, with its finale at the Tour Championship at East Lake Golf Club; and the biennial Presidents Cup. The remaining events on the PGA Tour are run by different organizations, as are the American-based LPGA Tour for women and other men's and women's professional tours around the world.

== History ==
The roots of the modern PGA Tour stretch back to April 10, 1916, when the Professional Golfers' Association of America (PGA) was formed. The modern tour recognizes wins from this era as "PGA Tour" victories despite the formal founding of the tour as a separate entity coming much later.

=== 1910s ===
By 1916, several prestigious golf tournaments offering prize money to the winner had been established in North America, including the North and South Open, the Metropolitan Open, the Canadian Open, the Shawnee Open, the Western Open and the U.S. Open. They formed the initial schedule of what came to be known much later as the "PGA Tour", with the addition of the PGA Championship in 1916. The Open Championship in the UK, the oldest golf tournament in the world founded in 1860, would become a PGA Tour event much later in 1995. All Open Championship wins dating back to 1860 were retroactively recognized as PGA Tour victories in 2002.

=== 1920s ===
Throughout the 1920s and 1930s, various state open tournaments began, many organized by sections of the PGA. Tournaments recognized as PGA Tour wins from this era include the California Open, Connecticut Open, Florida Open, Maryland Open, Massachusetts Open, New Jersey State Open, New York State Open, Ohio Open, Oklahoma Open, Oregon Open, Pennsylvania Open Championship, Utah Open, Virginia Open and the Wisconsin State Open. This legacy lives on with the modern PGA Tour as the Valero Texas Open dates back to this era of state opens on the tour.

The tour, then known informally as "The Circuit" for professional golfers in the PGA, became more formalized in 1929. A tournament committee was formed, consisting of Tommy Armour, Al Espinosa and J.J. Patterson.

=== 1930s ===
In 1930, Bob Harlow was hired as manager of the PGA Tournament Bureau and worked to formalize a year-round schedule of tournaments.

=== 1940s ===
In 1945, Byron Nelson enjoyed a record-breaking year, winning 18 PGA tournaments out of the 30 he played, including 11 in a row that he played in. Both records are yet to be beaten. The Byron Nelson, which became the first PGA Tour event to be named for a professional golfer in 1968, is played annually near Dallas.

=== 1950s ===
Throughout the 1950s, despite injuries from a car crash, star player Ben Hogan won 10 PGA Tour tournaments, including 6 major championships and three times at his hometown tournament in Fort Worth, Texas, the Colonial National Invitation. Younger working class player Arnold Palmer won 13 PGA Tour tournaments, becoming a crowd favorite and TV star including capturing his first Masters Tournament on CBS in 1958. Sam Snead was dominant on his way to a record-setting 82 PGA Tour career victories.

=== 1960s ===
Arnold Palmer and Jack Nicklaus were the dominant players of the 1960s, with Palmer winning 43 titles and Nicklaus winning 30.

With an increase of revenue in the late 1960s due to expanded television coverage, a dispute arose between the touring professionals and the PGA of America on how to distribute the windfall. The tour players wanted larger purses, where the PGA desired the money to go to the general fund to help grow the game at the local level. Following the final major in July 1968 at the PGA Championship, several leading tour pros voiced their dissatisfaction with the venue and the abundance of club pros in the field. The increased friction resulted in a new entity in August, what would eventually become the PGA Tour. Tournament players formed their own organization, American Professional Golfers, Inc. (APG), independent of the PGA of America. Its headquarters were in New York City.

After several months, a compromise was reached in December: the tour players agreed to abolish the APG and form the PGA "Tournament Players Division", a fully autonomous division under the supervision of a new 10-member Tournament Policy Board. The board consisted of four tour players, three PGA of America executives, and three outside members, initially business executives.

Joseph Dey, the recently retired USGA executive director, was selected by the board as the tour's first commissioner in January 1969 and agreed to a five-year contract. He was succeeded by tour player Deane Beman in early 1974, who served for twenty years.

=== 1970s ===
Jack Nicklaus continued his dominance, winning 38 titles.

The tour's name officially changed to the "PGA Tour" in 1975. In 1978 the PGA Tour "removed its restriction on women." However, no women have joined the tour since this date.

Without the tour players, the PGA of America became primarily an association of club professionals, but retained control of two significant events; the PGA Championship and the Ryder Cup. The former was an established major championship, but the latter was an obscure match play team event which was not particularly popular with golf fans, due to predictable dominance by the United States. With the addition of players from continental Europe in 1979 and expanded television coverage, it became very competitive and evolved into the premier international team event, lately dominated by Europe. Both events are very important revenue streams for the PGA of America.

The Players Championship, the tour's flagship event, was introduced in 1974.

=== 1980s ===
In late August 1981, the PGA Tour had a marketing dispute with the PGA of America and officially changed its name to the TPA Tour, for the "Tournament Players Association". The disputed issues were resolved within seven months and the tour's name was changed back to the "PGA Tour" in March 1982.

The Official World Golf Ranking was introduced in 1986, with the PGA Tour competing with the European Tour for the top golfers, including the world number one.

The Tour Championship was introduced in 1987.

=== 1990s ===
Tim Finchem became the third commissioner in June 1994 and continued for over 22 years; on January 1, 2017, he was succeeded by Jay Monahan.

As Tiger Woods emerged as a dominant player, TV ratings and revenues soared for the tour.

In 1999, the tour began play of the World Golf Championships.

=== 2000s ===
Tiger Woods continued his dominance of the tour in the 2000s, winning 57 of his 82 career titles.

Three of the four majors had settled into a pattern of play in eight weeks between June and August. In the past, this had threatened to make the last 2 1/2 months of the season anticlimactic, as some of the very top players competed less from that point on. In response, the PGA Tour introduced a new format in 2007, the FedEx Cup. From January through mid-August players competed in "regular season" events and earn FedEx Cup points, in addition to prize money. At the end of the regular season, the top 125 FedEx Cup points winners are eligible to compete in the "playoffs", four events taking place from mid-August to mid-September. The field sizes for these events are reduced from 125 to 100 to 70 and finally the traditional 30 for the Tour Championship. Additional FedEx Cup points are earned in these events. At the end of the championship, the top point winner is the season champion. To put this new system into place, the PGA Tour has made significant changes to the traditional schedule.

In 2007, The Players Championship moved to May so as to have a marquee event in five consecutive months. The Tour Championship moved to mid-September, with an international team event (Ryder Cup or Presidents Cup) following at the end of September. The schedule was tweaked slightly in both 2008 and 2009. After the third FedEx Cup playoff event, the BMW Championship, the Tour takes a full week off. In 2008, the break came before the Ryder Cup, with the Tour Championship the week after that. In 2009, the break was followed by the Tour Championship, with the Presidents Cup taking place two weeks after that.

2007 saw the introduction of a tournament in Mexico, an alternate event staged the same week as the WGC-Accenture Match Play Championship. A tournament in Puerto Rico was introduced in 2008 as an alternate event staged opposite the WGC-CA Championship.

The Tour continues through the fall, with the focus on the scramble of the less successful players to earn enough money to retain their tour cards. A circuit known as the Fall Series, originally with seven tournaments but now with four, was introduced in 2007. In its inaugural year, its events were held in seven consecutive weeks, starting the week after the Tour Championship. As was the case for the FedEx Cup playoff schedule, the Fall Series schedule was also tweaked in 2008 and 2009. The first 2008 Fall Series event was held opposite the Ryder Cup, and the Fall Series took a week off for the Tour Championship before continuing with its remaining six events.

In 2008, the PGA Tour Policy Board approved a change in the number of players that will make the cut. The cut will continue to be low 70 professionals and ties, unless that results in a post-cut field of more than 78 players. Under that circumstance, the cut score will be selected to make a field as close to 70 players as possible without exceeding 78. Players who are cut in such circumstances but who have placed 70th or worse will get credit for making the cut and will earn official money and FedEx Cup points. This policy affected two of the first three events with cuts, the Sony Open in Hawaii and the Buick Invitational. In late February, the Policy Board announced a revised cut policy, effective beginning with the Honda Classic. The new policy calls for 36-hole cut to the low 70 professionals and ties and, if that cut results in more than 78 players, a second 54-hole cut to the low 70 professionals and ties. Those who do not survive the 54-hole cut were designated as MDF (made the cut, did not finish). For the 2020 season, the cut line was reduced to 65 plus ties and eliminated the 54-hole cut.

The Fall Series saw major changes for 2009, with one of its events moving to May and another dropping off the schedule entirely. It returned to its original start date of the week after the Tour Championship. Then, as in 2008, it took a week off, this time for the Presidents Cup. It then continued with events in three consecutive weeks, took another week off for the HSBC Champions (now elevated to World Golf Championships status), and concluded the week after that.

=== 2010s ===
The Fall Series was reduced to four events, all held after the Tour Championship, for 2011. This followed the move of the Viking Classic into the regular season as an alternate event.

The 2013 season, which was the last before the tour transitioned to a schedule spanning two calendar years, had 40 official-money events in 38 weeks, including three alternate events played the same week as a higher-status tournament. The other event that is considered part of the 2013 season is the biennial Presidents Cup, matching a team of golfers representing the US with an "International" team consisting of non-European players (Europeans instead play in the Ryder Cup, held in even-numbered years).

Before the transition, the Tour held a group of events known as the PGA Tour Fall Series, which provided a final opportunity for golfers to make the top 125 in season earnings and thereby retain their Tour cards. With the change to an October-to-September season, several of the former Fall Series events will now open the season. The Tour also sanctions two events in Asia during that part of the year:

- The CIMB Classic, a limited-field event held in Malaysia and the Tour's first sanctioned event in Southeast Asia. The field is limited to 40 players—the top-25 available players in the final FedEx Cup standings, the top ten available Asian players and five sponsor's exemptions, with at least one place reserved for a Malaysian player. The 2013 edition, which was part of the 2014 season, was the first as an official-money event.
- The WGC-HSBC Champions, traditionally held the week after the Malaysia tournament. Despite its elevation to World Golf Championships status in 2009, it initially was not an official-money event. Starting in 2010, if the event was won by a PGA Tour member, it counted as an official win and carried the three-year exemption of the other WGCs. Starting in 2013, the HSBC Champions became an official money event, and wins are official for Tour and non-Tour members alike.

On March 20, 2012, the tour announced radical changes to the tour's season and qualifying process. Further details of these changes relating to the Fall Series were announced on June 26, with the remaining details announced on July 10. One of the final details received a minor tweak, effective for the 2013 season only, on September 11.

First, the 2013 season was the last to be conducted entirely within a calendar year. Since the 2014 season, the season starts in October of the previous calendar year, shortly after the Tour Championship. The tournaments in the now season-opening Fall Series are awarded full FedEx Cup points.

As a result of the schedule change, the qualifying school no longer grants playing rights on the PGA Tour, but only privileges on the Korn Ferry Tour.

The criterion for retaining tour cards at the end of the season also changed. Through 2012, the top 125 players on the money list at the end of the PGA Tour season retained their tour cards. For the 2013 season only, the top 125 players on both the money list and the FedEx Cup points list at the end of the FedEx Cup regular season in August retained their cards. The tour also said that it would decide at a later time whether to keep this aspect of the qualifying system in place in future seasons.

Otherwise, the planned move by the tour to have the top 125 players on the FedEx Cup points list retain their tour cards took effect with the 2014 season. The next 75 players on the points list, along with the top 75 on the money list of the Korn Ferry Tour at the end of that tour's regular season, are eligible to play a series of three tournaments in September known as the Korn Ferry Tour Finals. The Finals field, however, is not expected to consist of all 150 players, as some of the PGA Tour players will be exempt by other criteria, such as a tournament win in the previous two years. A total of 50 PGA Tour cards for the next season is awarded at the end of the Finals.

The 25 leading money winners during the Korn Ferry Tour regular season receive cards, and total money earned during the Finals determines the remaining 25 card earners. For all 50 new card earners, their positions on the PGA Tour's priority order for purposes of tournament are based on money earned in the Finals. College players who turn professional can enter the series if their earnings are equivalent to a top-200 PGA Tour or top-75 Korn Ferry Tour finish.

In addition, the leading money winners on the Korn Ferry Tour in both the regular season and Finals receive automatic invitations to The Players Championship (note that if a golfer tops both money lists, only one Players invitation is awarded).

Finally, two events held in Asia after the end of the PGA Tour's current regular season – the CIMB Classic in Malaysia and the HSBC Champions, a World Golf Championships event held in China – became full PGA Tour events, with official prize money, for the first time. Before 2013, neither event had full PGA Tour status despite being sanctioned by the Tour. Wins in the CIMB Classic were not classified as official PGA Tour wins, and HSBC Champions victories were official wins only for current PGA Tour members. Money earned in these events did not count as official PGA Tour earnings for any purpose.

=== 2020s ===
In June 2022, the PGA Tour suspended 17 players who played in the inaugural LIV Golf Invitational Series event. Monahan wrote in a memo to the tour's membership that any players who take part in future LIV Golf events will be subjected to the same punishment. PGA Tour members who joined LIV Golf included major champions Brooks Koepka, Bryson DeChambeau, Patrick Reed, Dustin Johnson, and Phil Mickelson.

In July 2022, it was reported that the US Department of Justice was investigating the PGA Tour to determine if it engaged in anti-competitive behavior with LIV Golf. In late 2021, the PGA Tour had begun speaking with White House officials and members of Congress to express concerns over LIV Golf. The tour paid over $400,000 to the firm DLA Piper to lobby lawmakers on their behalf for various topics including LIV Golf proposals. The tour had previously been investigated in the early 1990s, but despite tour policies having been found to be in violation of antitrust laws, no further action was taken.

In August 2022, 11 players who had joined LIV Golf filed an antitrust lawsuit against the PGA Tour to challenge their suspensions. Three players failed to obtain a temporary restraining order to allow them to participate in the FedEx Cup playoffs. The trial for the main case was scheduled to begin in September 2023.

On June 6, 2023, the PGA Tour, PGA European Tour, and LIV Golf announced that they would enter into an agreement to merge their commercial rights into a single, for-profit entity. The Saudi Public Investment Fund—which funded LIV Golf—will initially serve as the "exclusive investor" in the entity and have right of first refusal for future investments, while the PGA Tour will appoint the majority of its board members and have its commissioner Jay Monahan act as CEO. The agreement does not impact the three entities' administrative oversight over their events, hence the PGA Tour as a sanctioning entity will remain a 501(c)(6) nonprofit organization. The agreement ends all pending litigation between the organizations, and there are plans for a "fair and objective" process to readmit players blacklisted by the PGA Tour for defecting to LIV.

The announcement was met with shock from players, who did not learn of the agreement until it was officially announced, with media outlets describing them as having felt "betrayed" by the decision.

The deadline for completing the deal was December 31, 2023, although it was reported that the parties were attempting to negotiate an extension. Concurrently, the PGA Tour was negotiating with another investor, Strategic Sports Group, which is a consortium of professional sports owners—including Tom Werner, Arthur Blank, Steve Cohen, Wyc Grousbeck, Thomas S. Ricketts, and others—led by Fenway Sports Group. On January 31, 2024, the PGA Tour announced that it had agreed to a $3 billion investment by Strategic Sports Group into its for-profit arm, PGA Tour Enterprises. The consortium will pay $1.5 billion initially, and then a second $1.5 billion following the conclusion of negotiations between the PGA Tour and the Saudi Public Investment Fund. In addition, active players will be given an opportunity to receive grants of equity in PGA Tour Enterprises.

In June 2025, NFL executive Brian Rolapp was announced as the next CEO effective 2026.

In August 2025, Tiger Woods was appointed chair of the PGA Tour's newly created Future Competition Committee, which was established to review and propose reforms to the Tour's competition model.

In November 2025, the PGA Tour announced that any players who played for the LIV Golf Promotions event would not be granted conflicting events or media releases for tournaments in North America, and could be sanctioned or subjected to a one-year ban from PGA Tour events.

In January 2026, the PGA Tour announced its limited time Returning Member's Program. This program will allow select former tour members who had been previously banned from the PGA Tour after competing in LIV Golf events to reenter the Tour. As this announcement was made, 9-time PGA Tour winner Brooks Koepka announced that he would be returning to the PGA Tour through this program, making him the first player to do so.

== Tournaments ==
Most members of the tour play between 20 and 30 tournaments in the season. The geography of the tour is determined by climate. It starts in Hawaii in January and spends most of its first two months in California and Arizona during what is known as the "West Coast Swing" and then moves to the American Southeast for the "Southern Swing". Each swing culminates in a significant tour event. In April, tour events begin to drift north. The summer months are spent mainly in the Northeast and the Midwest, and in the fall (autumn) the tour heads south again.

In most of the regular events on tour, the field is either 132, 144 or 156 players, depending on time of year (and available daylight hours). All players making the cut earn money for the tournament with the winner usually receiving 18% of the total purse.

In the event that the PGA Tour cannot guarantee four rounds of play, the PGA Tour can shorten an event to 54 holes. A 54-hole event is still considered official, with full points and monies awarded. Any tournament stopped before 54 holes can be completed is reverted to the 36-hole score and the win is considered unofficial, notably Adam Scott at the 2005 Nissan Open.

- Desert Classic, first played in 1960
- The Sentry, first played in 1952
- AT&T Pebble Beach Pro-Am, first played in 1937
- Phoenix Open, first played in 1932
- Los Angeles Open, first played in 1926
- Mexico Open, first played in 1944
- Cognizant Classic, first played in 1972
- Arnold Palmer Invitational, first played in 1966
- Puerto Rico Open, first played in 2008
- The Players Championship, first played in 1974
- Valspar Championship, first played in 2000
- Houston Open, first played in 1946
- Valero Texas Open, first played in 1922
- Masters Tournament, first played in 1934
- Corales Puntacana Championship, first played in 2016
- RBC Heritage, first played in 1969
- Zurich Classic of New Orleans, first played in 1938
- The Byron Nelson, first played in 1944
- Truist Championship, first played in 2003
- Myrtle Beach Classic, first played in 2024
- PGA Championship, first played in 1916
- Colonial National Invitation, first played in 1946
- Canadian Open, first played in 1904
- Memorial Tournament, first played in 1976
- U.S. Open, first played in 1895
- Travelers Championship, first played in 1952
- Rocket Mortgage Classic, first played in 2019
- John Deere Classic, first played in 1971
- Scottish Open, first played in 1972
- ISCO Championship, first played in 2015
- The Open Championship, first played in 1860
- 3M Open, first played in 2019
- Golf at the Summer Olympics (no official prize money)
- Wyndham Championship, first played in 1938
- St. Jude Championship, first played in 1958
- BMW Championship, first played in 2007
- Ryder Cup, first played in 1927 (no official prize money)
- Presidents Cup, first played in 1994 (no official prize money)
- Sanderson Farms Championship, first played in 1968
- Zozo Championship, first played in 2019
- World Wide Technology Championship, first played in 2007
- Bermuda Championship, first played in 2019
- RSM Classic, first played in 2010
- Tour Championship, first played in 1987
- Hero World Challenge, first played in 2000
- Father/Son Challenge, first played in 1995

=== Future ===
In June 2026, the PGA Tour unveiled a new competitive model to debut for the 2028 season. The new model will split the tour into two series, the Championship Series and Challenger Series, with a promotion and relegation system between the two. The Championship Series will have a schedule of approximately 23–24 tournaments from February to August (including majors and other special events), and each tournament will have a field of approximately 120 and a purse of at least $20 million. The Challenger Series schedule will run concurrently with the Championship Series, and will also feature tournaments on seven weekends that the Championship Series will be off. All Challenger Series tournaments will have a field of approximately 144 and a purse of at least $4 million.

A new points system will be developed to determine rankings of players in both series. Approximately 130 players will play in the Championship Series, and at least the top 90 finishers in rankings will be retained. In the Challenger Series, the top 20 finishers on the season will be promoted.

== Tours operated by the PGA Tour ==
The PGA Tour does not run any of the four major championships (Masters, PGA Championship, U.S. Open, The Open), or the Ryder Cup. The PGA of America, not the PGA Tour, runs the PGA Championship and the Senior PGA Championship, and co-organizes the Ryder Cup with Ryder Cup Europe, a company controlled by the PGA European Tour. Additionally, the PGA Tour is not involved with the women's golf tours in the U.S., which are mostly controlled by the LPGA. The PGA Tour is also not the governing body for the game of golf in the United States; this, instead, is the role of the United States Golf Association (USGA), which organizes the U.S. Open. What the PGA Tour does organize are the remaining 43 (in 2009) week-to-week events, including The Players Championship and the FedEx Cup events, as well as the biennial Presidents Cup. It also runs the main tournaments on five other tours: PGA Tour Champions, the Korn Ferry Tour (formerly known as Web.com Tour), PGA Tour Canada, PGA Tour China, and PGA Tour Latinoamérica.

The PGA Tour operates six tours. Three of them are primarily contested in the U.S., and the other three are international developmental tours centered on a specific country or region.

- PGA Tour, the top tour.
  - Some events take place outside the United States: Canada, South Korea, Japan, the United Kingdom, the Dominican Republic and Bermuda host one sole-sanctioned event each year; Mexico hosts two. The events in Bermuda and the Dominican Republic are alternate events held opposite World Golf Championships tournaments (similar to the Puerto Rican Open) and therefore have weaker fields than regular Tour events. In addition, China hosts a World Golf Championships event and the United Kingdom hosts a major championship.
- PGA Tour Champions, for golfers age 50 and over
  - As of 2016, one regular tournament is held in Canada, and one of the senior majors is held in the UK, the rest in the US.
  - For the 2026 season, the Portugal Invitational will make its debut.
- Korn Ferry Tour, a US developmental tour and the primary pipeline to the PGA Tour.
  - As of 2026, Bahamas, Colombia, Panama, Argentina, Chile, Brazil, Mexico, host one tournament each.
- PGA Tour Latinoamérica, an international developmental tour
  - Originally, nine Latin American countries hosted tournaments. Now as of 2026, it has merged with PGA Tour Canada to form PGA Tour Americas.
- PGA Tour Canada, another international developmental tour
  - Historically known as the "Canadian Tour", it was taken over by the PGA Tour in November 2012. The 2013 season, the first under PGA Tour operation, began with a qualifying school in California, followed by nine tournaments in Canada. As of 2026, it merged with PGA Tour Latinoamerica to form PGA Tour Americas
- PGA Tour Americas, a new international development tour that serves as a stepping stone to the Korn Ferry Tour.
  - It was formed in 2024 with the merger of PGA Tour Canada and PGA Tour Latinoamerica. The first six events are played in Central and South America and the following nine events are played in North America. The season finale is played in the Dominican Republic.
- PGA Tour China, also an international developmental tour
  - Launched in 2014, it is independent of the former China Tour, which folded after its 2009 season.

The PGA Tour also conducts an annual Qualifying Tournament, known colloquially as "Q-School" and held over six rounds each fall. Before 2013, the official name of the tournament was the PGA Tour Qualifying Tournament; it is now officially the Korn Ferry Tour Qualifying Tournament. Through the 2012 edition, the top-25 finishers, including ties, received privileges to play on the following year's PGA Tour. Remaining finishers in the top 75, plus ties, received full privileges on the Korn Ferry Tour. Since 2013, all competitors who made the final phase of Q-School earned status on the Korn Ferry Tour at the start of the following season, with high finishers receiving additional rights as follows:

- Golfers who finish 11th through 45th (including ties) are exempt until the second "reshuffle" of the following season (first eight events).
  - On the Korn Ferry Tour, a "reshuffle" refers to a reordering of the tour's eligibility list, which determines the players who can enter tournaments. After four tournaments, and every fourth tournament thereafter until the Korn Ferry Tour Finals, players are re-ranked according to their tour earnings on the season. However, the ranking position of players who are exempt from a "reshuffle" does not change.
- Those who finish 2nd through 10th (including ties) are exempt until the third reshuffle of the following season (first 12 events).
- The medalist (top finisher) has full playing privileges for the entire regular season, which carries with it automatic entry to the Tour Finals.

Since 2013, 50 Korn Ferry Tour golfers earn privileges during the next PGA Tour season, which now begins the month after the Tour Finals. The top 25 money winners over the regular season (i.e., before the Tour Finals) receive PGA Tour cards, as do the top 25 money winners in the Finals. The priority position of all 50 golfers on the PGA Tour is based on money earned during the Tour Finals, except that the regular season money leader shares equal status with the Finals money leader. In addition, a golfer who wins three events on that tour in a calendar year earns a "performance promotion" (informally a "battlefield promotion") which garners PGA Tour privileges for the remainder of the year plus the following full season.

At the end of each year, the top 125 in FedEx Cup points (top 125 on the money list before 2013) receive a tour card for the following season, which gives them exemption from qualifying for most of the next year's tournaments. However, at some events, known as invitationals, exemptions apply only to the previous year's top 70 players. Since 2013, players who are ranked between 126 and 200 in FedEx Cup points (and are not already exempt by other means) are eligible for entry in the Korn Ferry Tour Finals, where they can regain their PGA Tour privileges. Non-exempt players who finish 126th–150th in the FedEx Cup but fail to regain their PGA Tour cards are given conditional PGA Tour status for the season and are fully exempt on the Korn Ferry Tour.

Winning a PGA Tour event provides a tour card for a minimum of two years, with an extra year added for each additional win with a maximum of five years. Winning a World Golf Championships event, The Tour Championship, the Arnold Palmer Invitational, or the Memorial Tournament provides a three-year exemption. Winners of the major championships, The Players Championship, and the FedEx Cup earn a five-year exemption. Other types of exemptions include lifetime exemptions for players with twenty wins on the tour; one-time, one-year exemptions for players in the top fifty on the career money earnings list who are not otherwise exempt; two-time, one-year exemptions for players in the top twenty-five on the career money list; and medical exemptions for players who have been injured or are going through a family crisis, which give them an opportunity to regain their tour card after a period out of the tour. In 2015, the PGA Tour added a clause which would freeze an exemption for those required to perform military service in their native countries in response to South Korea's Bae Sang-moon having to leave the Tour for that reason. Once a player wins a PGA Tour event, he will have at minimum past champion status should he fail to retain PGA Tour privileges.

Non-members can play their way into the PGA Tour by finishing the equivalent or better of 125th in FedEx Cup points. Those who fail but fall within the top 200 in current season points are eligible for the Korn Ferry Tour Finals. During the season, non-members can earn Special Temporary Member status by exceeding the equivalent of 150th in the previous season's FedEx Cup. Special Temporary Members receive unlimited sponsor exemptions, while non-members are limited to seven per season and twelve total events.

Similar to other major league sports, there is no rule that limits PGA Tour players to "men only". In 1938, Babe Zaharias became the first woman to compete in a PGA Tour event. In 1945, Zaharias became the first and only woman to make a cut in a PGA Tour event. In 2003, Annika Sörenstam and Suzy Whaley played in PGA Tour events, and Michelle Wie did so in each year from 2004 through 2008. In 2011, Isabelle Beisiegel became the first woman to earn a Tour card on a "men's" professional golf tour, the Canadian Tour, now PGA Tour Canada.

The LPGA Tour like all other women's sports, is limited to female participants only, except for mixed tournaments.

An organization called the PGA European Tour, separate from both the PGA Tour and the PGA of America, runs a tour, mostly in Europe, but with events throughout the world outside of North America. Several other regional tours are around the world. However, the PGA Tour, European Tour, and many of the regional tours co-sponsor the World Golf Championships. These, along with the major championships, usually count toward the official money lists of each tour as well as the Official World Golf Ranking.

== Charity fundraising ==
The PGA Tour places a strong emphasis on charity fundraising, usually on behalf of local charities in cities where events are staged. With the exception of a few older events, PGA Tour rules require all Tour events to be non-profit; the Tour itself is also a non-profit company. In 2005, it started a campaign to push its all-time fundraising tally past one billion dollars ("Drive to a Billion"), and it reached that mark one week before the end of the season. However, monies raised for charities derive from the tournaments' positive revenues (if any), and not any actual monetary donation from the PGA Tour, whose purse monies and expenses are guaranteed. The number of charities which receive benefits from PGA Tour, PGA Tour Champions and Korn Ferry Tour events is estimated at over 2,000. In 2009, the total raised for charity was some $108 million. The organization announced to have generated $180 million for charities in 2017 through the tournaments of its six tours.

== Media coverage ==
=== Domestic ===
The PGA Tour's broadcast television rights are held by CBS Sports and NBC Sports, under contracts most recently renewed in 2020 to last through 2030. While it considered invoking an option to opt out of its broadcast television contracts in 2017, the PGA Tour ultimately decided against doing so. Golf Channel (which, since the acquisition of NBC Universal by Golf Channel owner Comcast, is a division of NBC Sports) has served as the pay television rightsholder of the PGA Tour since 2007. Under the contracts, CBS broadcasts weekend coverage for an average of 20 events per season, and NBC broadcasts weekend coverage for an average of 10 events per season. Golf Channel broadcasts early-round and weekend morning coverage of all events, as well as weekend coverage of events not broadcast on terrestrial television, and primetime encores of all events.

On March 9, 2020, the PGA Tour announced that it had reached an agreement to renew its contracts with CBS and NBC, which expired after the 2020–21 season, through 2030, maintaining most of the existing broadcast arrangements, but with the rights to the final three events of the FedEx Cup playoffs now alternating between CBS and NBC annually. A notable change in production under the new contract is that the PGA Tour now controls the on-site production and infrastructure for all media partners, although each individual broadcaster continues to employ their own on-air talent and personnel.

Tournaments typically featured in NBC's package include marquee events such as The Players Championship, and the biennial Presidents Cup event. The 2011 contract granted more extensive digital rights, as well as the ability for NBC to broadcast supplemental coverage of events on Golf Channel during its broadcast windows. Until 2022, coverage of the final three FedEx Cup playoff tournaments was also exclusive to NBC.

The PGA Tour operates a streaming service known as PGA Tour Live, which carries early-round coverage of events preceding Golf Channel television coverage, including featured groups. The service is offered as a subscription basis; until 2019, it was operated by BAMTech (formerly MLB Advanced Media), and for a period, was also carried as part of ESPN+. From 2019 to 2021, it has been operated under NBC Sports' subscription streaming platform NBC Sports Gold, adding featured holes coverage during Golf Channel's windows. Since 2017, following a pilot at the end of the 2016 season, portions of the PGA Tour Live coverage are also carried for free via the PGA Tour's Twitter account. Under the 2022–2030 contract, the service moved back to ESPN+.

In 2005, the PGA Tour reached a deal with XM Satellite Radio to co-produce a channel, the PGA Tour Network (now SiriusXM PGA Tour Radio), featuring event coverage and talk programming relating to golf (which, since 2013, has also included audio simulcasts of selected Golf Channel programs). Its contract with SiriusXM was renewed through 2021.

=== International ===
The PGA Tour is also covered extensively outside the United States. In the United Kingdom, Sky Sports was the main broadcaster of the tour for a number of years up to 2006. Setanta Sports won exclusive UK and Ireland rights for six years from 2007 for a reported cost of £103 million. The deal includes Champions Tour and the Nationwide Tour events, but like the U.S. television deals it does not include the major championships, and unlike the U.S. deal, it does not include the World Golf Championships. Setanta set up the Setanta Golf channel to present its coverage. On June 23, 2009, Setanta's UK arm went into administration and ceased broadcasting. The Sky Sports Golf channel is currently the UK broadcaster.

Eurosport picked up the television rights for the remainder of the 2009 season. Sky Sports regained the TV rights with an eight-year deal from 2010 to 2017. In South Korea, SBS, which has been the tour's exclusive TV broadcaster in that country since the mid-1990s, agreed in 2009 to extend its contract with the PGA Tour through 2019. As a part of that deal, it became sponsor of the season's opening tournament, a winners-only event that was renamed the SBS Championship effective in 2010. In 2011 however, Korean automobile manufacturer Hyundai took over the title sponsorship, but SBS still remains a sponsor of the event.

In June 2018, it was announced that Eurosport's parent company Discovery, Inc. had acquired exclusive international media rights to the PGA Tour outside of the United States, beginning 2019, under a 12-year, US$2 billion deal. The contract covers Discovery's international channels (including Eurosport), sub-licensing arrangements with local broadcasters, and development of an international PGA Tour over the top subscription service—which was unveiled in October under the brand GolfTV. The service would replace PGA Tour Live in international markets as existing rights lapse, beginning with Australia, Canada, Italy, Japan, the Netherlands, Portugal, Russia and Spain in January 2019. GolfTV also acquired rights to the Ryder Cup and European Tour in selected markets, and signed a deal with Tiger Woods to develop original content centered upon him. GolfTV was shuttered in November 2022 after Discovery merged with WarnerMedia, with Warner Bros. Discovery prioritizing its Discovery+ and HBO Max services instead.

Beginning at the 2025 Players Championship, the PGA Tour began to produce a dedicated world feed for international broadcasters, separate from the American network coverage.

== Priority ranking system ==
The PGA Tour maintains a priority ranking system that is used to select the fields for most tournaments on tour. Below is the 2016–17 ranking system, in order of priority.

1. Winner of PGA Championship or U.S. Open prior to 1970 or in the last five seasons and the current season
2. Winner of The Players Championship in the last five seasons and the current season
3. Winners of the Masters Tournament in the last five seasons and the current season
4. Winners of The Open Championship in the last five seasons and the current season
5. Winners of the Tour Championship in the last three seasons and the current season
6. Winners of World Golf Championships events in the last three seasons and the current season
7. Winners of the Arnold Palmer Invitational and the Memorial Tournament in the last three seasons and the current season, beginning with the 2015 winners
8. Leader from the final FedExCup Points List in each of the last five seasons
9. Leaders from the final PGA Tour Money List prior to 2017 for the subsequent five seasons
10. Winners of PGA Tour co-sponsored or approved tournaments, whose victories are considered official, within the last two seasons, or during the current season; winners receive an additional season of exemption for each additional win, up to five seasons
11. Career earnings
  A. Players among the top 50 in career earnings as of the end of the preceding season may elect to use a one-time exemption for the next season
  B. Players among the Top 25 in career earnings as of the end of the preceding season may elect to use this special one-time exemption for the next season
12. Sponsor exemptions (a maximum of eight, which may include amateurs with handicaps of 0 or less), on the following basis:
  A. Not less than two sponsor invitees shall be PGA Tour members not otherwise exempt.
  B. Not less than two of the 2016 Top Finishers of the Web.com Tour, if not all can otherwise be accommodated.
13. Two international players designated by the Commissioner.
14. The current PGA Club Professional Champion up to six open events (3 must be opposite The Open Championship and World Golf Championships events), in addition to any sponsor selections. The exemption does not apply to open, limited-field events.
15. PGA Section Champion or Player of the Year of the Section in which the tournament is played.
16. Four low scorers at Open Qualifying which shall normally be held on Monday of tournament week.
17. Past champions of the particular event being contested that week, if cosponsored by the PGA Tour and the same tournament organizer (not title sponsor), as follows:
  A. Winners prior to July 28, 1970: unlimited exemptions for such events.
  B. Winners after Jan. 1, 2000: five seasons of exemptions for such events.
18. Life Members (who have been active members of the PGA Tour for 15 years and have won at least 20 co-sponsored events).
19. Top 125 on the previous season's FedExCup points list.
20. Top 125 on previous season's Official Money List through the Wyndham Championship
21. Players who finished greater than or equal to top 125 on the 2015–16 PGA Tour Official Season FedExCup Points List or top 125 on the 2015–16 Official Season Money List through the Wyndham Championship as non-members
22. Major Medical Extension: If granted by the Commissioner, if not otherwise eligible, and if needed to fill the field, Special Medical Extension
23. Leading Money Winner from the previous season's Top 25 regular season players using combined money earned on the Official Web.com Tour Regular Season Money List and Web.com Tour Finals Money List, Leading Money Winner from the previous season's Web.com Tour Finals and Three-Time Winners from previous season Web.com Tour.
24. Leading money winner from Web.com Tour medical
25. Top 10 and ties, not otherwise exempt, among professionals from the previous open tournament whose victory has official status are exempt into the next open tournament whose victory has official status.
26. Top Finishers of the Web.com Tour
27. Top Finishers from the Web.com Tour medical
28. Players winning three Web.com Tour events in the current season
29. Minor medical extension
30. Twenty-five finishers beyond 125th place on prior season's FedExCup Points List (126–150)
31. Nonexempt, major medical/family crisis
32. The following categories are reordered after the end of calendar year tournament, The Players, and the majors, based on FedEx Cup points the previous season, and then if necessary, career earnings, for players outside 150th on the FedEx Cup points list.
  Past Champions - Players who have won a PGA Tour event.
  Special Temporary Members - Non-members who scored more points than 150th place in the previous year's FedEx Cup points list.
  Team Tournament Winners - Players who have won a team tournament.
  Veteran Members - Players with over 150 cuts made in the PGA Tour. Ordered by money won in career.

Some tournaments deviate from this system; for example, the Phoenix Open has only five sponsor exemptions and three Monday qualifying spots, while invitational tournaments such as the Arnold Palmer Invitational, Memorial Tournament, and Dean & DeLuca Invitational have completely different eligibility categories.

== Event categories ==
Majors
The four leading annual events in world golf are the Masters Tournament, U.S. Open, The (British) Open Championship, and the PGA Championship. These events each automatically receive 100 OWGR points.
World Golf Championships (WGC)
A set of events co-sanctioned by the International Federation of PGA Tours which attract the leading golfers from all over the world, including those who are not members of the PGA Tour. The HSBC Champions was made a WGC event in 2009.
Unique
The Players Championship is the only event, apart from the majors and the World Golf Championships, which attracts entries from almost all of the world's elite golfers. It is the designated OWGR flagship event for the PGA Tour and awards 80 OWGR points to its winner. Only major championships can be awarded more OWGR points. For purposes of the FedEx Cup standings, The Players has had an identical point allocation to that of the majors since the Cup was instituted in 2007.

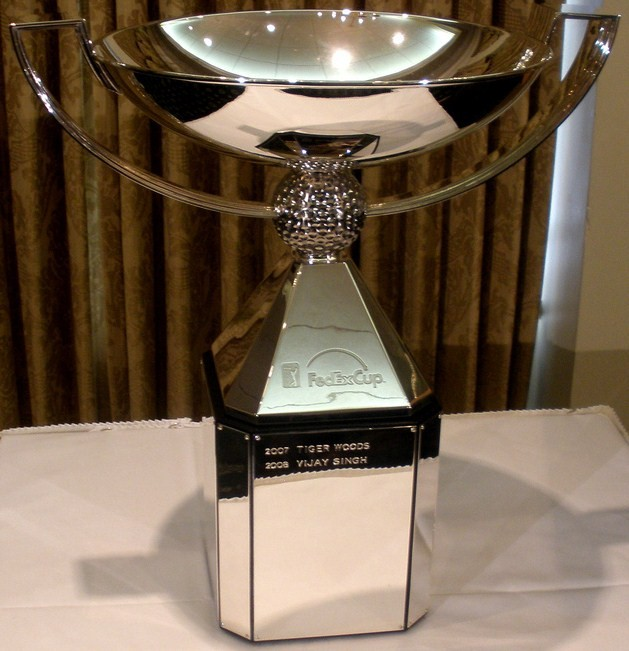
The FedEx Cup, presented to the winner of the season-ending playoffs

Playoff event
The final three events of the season (four from 2007 to 2018) are the FedEx Cup playoffs. The top 125 players on the points list are eligible for the first event and the field size decreases to The Tour Championship with 30 players.

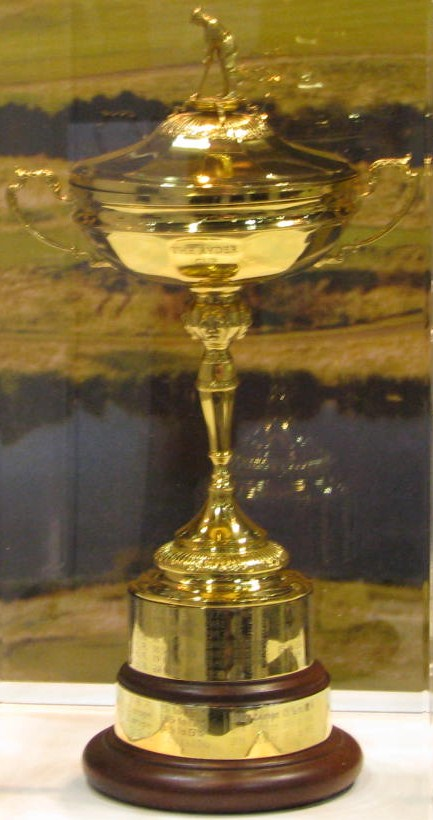
The Ryder Cup, contested in even-numbered years between teams from Europe and the United States

Signature events
Starting in 2024, the PGA Tour established events featuring limited fields of the tour's top players, as a response to the threat of LIV Golf. These events feature an increased purse of $20 million and additional FedEx cup points. Qualification for these events are limited to:

- The top 50 players in the previous year's FedEx Cup standings
- The top 10 players in the current FedEx Cup rankings who did not finish in the previous year's top 50 (branded as the "Aon Next 10")
- The five otherwise-ineligible players who accumulated the most FedEx Cup points in events which took place between each Signature event (branded as the "Aon Swing 5")
- All PGA Tour members ranked within the top 30 in the OWGR
- Four sponsor's exemptions per tournament, plus additional exemptions at the Arnold Palmer, Genesis Invitational, and Memorial

For 2025, eight tournaments were designated as "Signature Events": the Sentry Tournament of Champions, AT&T Pebble Beach Pro-Am, Genesis Invitational, Arnold Palmer Invitational, RBC Heritage, Truist Championship, The Memorial Tournament, and the Travelers Championship.

Regular
Routine weekly tour events. The "regular" events vary somewhat in status, but this is fairly subjective and not usually based on the size of the purse. Some of the factors which can determine the status of a tournament are:

- Its position in the schedule, which influences the number of leading players that choose to enter.
- Its age and the distinction of its past champions.
- The repute of the course on which it is played.
- Any associations with "legends of golf". Six events in particular have such associations (four of these are invitational events):
  - The AT&T Byron Nelson, named after Byron Nelson, was until 2007 the only current event named after a PGA Tour golfer.
  - The Arnold Palmer Invitational, formerly the Bay Hill Invitational, closely identified with Arnold Palmer and played at a resort he owned.
  - The Genesis Invitational, identified with Tiger Woods through his foundation as of 2020.
  - The Charles Schwab Challenge, identified with Ben Hogan.
  - The Memorial Tournament, founded by Jack Nicklaus, played on a course he designed, and annually honoring a selected "legend".

Team
A United States team of 12 elite players competes in the Ryder Cup and the Presidents Cup in alternate years. The Ryder Cup, pitting a team of U.S. golfers against a European team, is arguably the highest profile event in golf, outranking the majors. The Presidents Cup, which matches a team of U.S. golfers against an international team of golfers not eligible for the Ryder Cup, is less well established, but is still the main event of the week when it is played. There is no prize money in these events, so they are irrelevant to the money list, but an immense amount of pride rides on the results.
Invitational
These events are similar to the regular ones, but have a slightly smaller field and do not follow the normal PGA Tour exemption categories. Invitational tournaments include the Genesis Invitational, the Charles Schwab Challenge, the Arnold Palmer Invitational, the RBC Heritage, the Memorial Tournament. The tournaments usually have an association with a golf legend, or in the case of the RBC Heritage, a famous course. The table below illustrates some of the notable features of the exemption categories for these events:

Overview of PGA Tour events
Tournament	Field size	Exemptions based on FedEx Cup standings		Sponsor exemptions	Method of filling field
Tournament	Field size	Previous year	Current	Sponsor exemptions	Method of filling field
Genesis Invitational	120	Top 125	Top 10	8	Current FedEx Cup standings
Arnold Palmer Invitational	120	Top 70	Top 70	18	Current FedEx Cup standings
RBC Heritage	132	Top 125	Top 10	8	Standard exemption categories
Charles Schwab Challenge	120+	Top 80	Top 80	12	Current FedEx Cup standings
Memorial Tournament	120	Top 70	Top 70	14	Alternating current and previous year's FedEx Cup standings

Alternate
Events which are played in the same week as a higher status tournament (either a Signature Event or the Open Championship) and therefore have significantly weakened fields and reduced prize money. They are often considered an opportunity for players who would not qualify for certain events due to their world rankings, positions on the FedEx Cup points list, or position on the Tour's priority list to move up more easily or have an easier attempt at a two-year exemption for winning a tournament. Because of their weaker fields, these events usually receive the minimum amount of world ranking points reserved for PGA Tour events (24 points) and fewer FedEx Cup points than most tournaments (300 points instead of 500). Alternate event winners also do not earn Masters invitations. Fields for alternate events have 132 players. These events have 12 unrestricted sponsor exemptions, four more than the regular events.
Fall Series (defunct)
Prior to the 2013 season, the PGA Tour included a fall series consisting of those events after the final playoff event of the FedEx Cup season (The Tour Championship) through the end of the calendar year. These events provided extra opportunities for players to retain their cards by finishing within the top 125 of the money list. Since fall 2013 (the 2014 season), the events held in the fall have opened the tour season, and receive full FedEx Cup points allocations and Masters invitations
Challenge Season
There are also a number of events which are recognized by the PGA Tour, but which do not count towards the official money list. Most of these take place in the off season (November and December). This slate of unofficial, often made-for-TV events (which have included the PGA Grand Slam of Golf, the Wendy's 3-Tour Challenge, the Franklin Templeton Shootout, the Skins Game, etc.) is referred to as the "Challenge Season" or more commonly as the "Silly Season".

== PGA Tour University ==
In June 2020, the PGA Tour announced the creation of PGA Tour University, a scheme to create pathways for collegiate golfers to join development tours operated by the PGA Tour. At its start, it planned to award Korn Ferry Tour cards to the top five collegiate golfers in the United States, and playing status on the PGA Tour Canada, PGA Tour Latinoamérica, or PGA Tour China to the golfers ranked no. 6 through 15. The eligibility for these rankings was limited to seniors, as an incentive to encourage the top golfers to stay in college.

The PGA Tour University system was modified in November 2022, and beginning in 2023 the top-ranked collegiate golfer would immediately be awarded membership on the PGA Tour. Golf Magazine stated this change was a response to LIV Golf, which had recruited Eugenio Chacarra and David Puig directly from college in the preceding few months. Ludvig Åberg of Texas Tech University topped the PGA Tour University rankings after the conclusion of the 2023 NCAA D-I National Championship, and so became the first player to receive a PGA Tour card through the university ranking system. In October 2023, following the World Team Amateur Championship in Dubai, Gordon Sargent reached the 20-point threshold and became the first ever player to earn PGA Tour card through PGA Tour University Accelerated program. He is eligible to take up the membership following the conclusion of 2024 NCAA Division I Championship but elected to defer his membership and return for his senior year at Vanderbilt.

In 2024, PGA Tour University gave PGA Tour Americas cards to golfers who finished 11th-25th (up from 20th) in the rankings and entry into the second stage of PGA Tour Q School. Those 6th through 10th are conditionally exempt on the Korn Ferry Tour, fully exempt on PGA Tour Americas, and earn entry into the second stage of Q School. Players ranked 2nd to 5th are fully exempt on the Korn Ferry Tour, can earn unlimited PGA Tour sponsor exemptions, and are entered into the final stage of PGA Tour Q School. The top player is fully exempt on the PGA Tour for the remainder of the current season and all of the next season. The Division II Jack Nicklaus Award winner also earns status on PGA Tour Americas.

=== List of PGA Tour card winners ===
This is a list of the players to have won PGA Tour cards by topping the PGA Tour University rankings. A player's "point average" is the average number of points he receives at each tournament on the PGA Tour University schedule, multiplied by 100.

Year	Winner	Points average
2026	(United States) Ben James	1270.2865
2025	(United States) David Ford	1214.0040
2024	(United States) Michael Thorbjornsen	1334.7682
2023	(Sweden) Ludvig Åberg	1339.9660

== Money list winners ==
Season	Winner	Prize money ($)
2025	(United States) Scottie Scheffler (4)	27,659,550
2024	(United States) Scottie Scheffler (3)	29,228,357
2022–23	(United States) Scottie Scheffler (2)	21,014,342
2021–22	(United States) Scottie Scheffler	14,046,910
2020–21	(Spain) Jon Rahm	7,705,933
2019–20	(United States) Justin Thomas (3)	7,344,040
2018–19	(United States) Brooks Koepka	9,684,006
2017–18	(United States) Justin Thomas (2)	8,694,821
2016–17	(United States) Justin Thomas	9,921,560
2015–16	(United States) Dustin Johnson	9,365,185
2014–15	(United States) Jordan Spieth	12,030,465
2013–14	(Northern Ireland) Rory McIlroy (2)	8,280,096
2013	(United States) Tiger Woods (10)	8,553,439
2012	(Northern Ireland) Rory McIlroy	8,047,952
2011	(England) Luke Donald	6,683,214
2010	(United States) Matt Kuchar	4,910,477
2009	(United States) Tiger Woods (9)	10,508,163
2008	(Fiji) Vijay Singh (3)	6,601,094
2007	(United States) Tiger Woods (8)	10,867,052
2006	(United States) Tiger Woods (7)	9,941,563
2005	(United States) Tiger Woods (6)	10,628,024
2004	(Fiji) Vijay Singh (2)	10,905,166
2003	(Fiji) Vijay Singh	7,573,907
2002	(United States) Tiger Woods (5)	6,912,625
2001	(United States) Tiger Woods (4)	5,687,777
2000	(United States) Tiger Woods (3)	9,188,321
1999	(United States) Tiger Woods (2)	6,616,585
1998	(United States) David Duval	2,591,031
1997	(United States) Tiger Woods	2,066,833
1996	(United States) Tom Lehman	1,780,159
1995	(Australia) Greg Norman (3)	1,654,959
1994	(Zimbabwe) Nick Price (2)	1,499,927
1993	(Zimbabwe) Nick Price	1,478,557
1992	(United States) Fred Couples	1,344,188
1991	(United States) Corey Pavin	979,430
1990	(Australia) Greg Norman (2)	1,165,477
1989	(United States) Tom Kite (2)	1,395,278
1988	(United States) Curtis Strange (3)	1,147,644
1987	(United States) Curtis Strange (2)	925,941
1986	(Australia) Greg Norman	653,296
1985	(United States) Curtis Strange	542,321
1984	(United States) Tom Watson (5)	476,260
1983	(United States) Hal Sutton	426,668
1982	(United States) Craig Stadler	446,462
1981	(United States) Tom Kite	375,699
1980	(United States) Tom Watson (4)	530,808
1979	(United States) Tom Watson (3)	462,636
1978	(United States) Tom Watson (2)	362,429
1977	(United States) Tom Watson	310,653
1976	(United States) Jack Nicklaus (8)	266,438
1975	(United States) Jack Nicklaus (7)	298,149
1974	(United States) Johnny Miller	353,021
1973	(United States) Jack Nicklaus (6)	308,362
1972	(United States) Jack Nicklaus (5)	320,542
1971	(United States) Jack Nicklaus (4)	244,491
1970	(United States) Lee Trevino	157,037
1969	(United States) Frank Beard	164,707
1968	(United States) Billy Casper (2)	205,168
1967	(United States) Jack Nicklaus (3)	188,998
1966	(United States) Billy Casper	121,945
1965	(United States) Jack Nicklaus (2)	140,752
1964	(United States) Jack Nicklaus	113,285
1963	(United States) Arnold Palmer (4)	128,230
1962	(United States) Arnold Palmer (3)	81,448
1961	(South Africa) Gary Player	64,540
1960	(United States) Arnold Palmer (2)	80,968
1959	(United States) Art Wall Jr.	53,168
1958	(United States) Arnold Palmer	42,608
1957	(United States) Dick Mayer	65,835
1956	(United States) Ted Kroll	72,836
1955	(United States) Julius Boros (2)	63,122
1954	(United States) Bob Toski	65,820
1953	(United States) Lew Worsham	34,002
1952	(United States) Julius Boros	37,033
1951	(United States) Lloyd Mangrum	26,089
1950	(United States) Sam Snead (3)	35,759
1949	(United States) Sam Snead (2)	31,594
1948	(United States) Ben Hogan (5)	32,112
1947	(United States) Jimmy Demaret	27,937
1946	(United States) Ben Hogan (4)	42,556
1945	(United States) Byron Nelson (2)	63,336
1944	(United States) Byron Nelson	37,968
1943: No information known
1942	(United States) Ben Hogan (3)	13,143
1941	(United States) Ben Hogan (2)	18,358
1940	(United States) Ben Hogan	10,655
1939	(United States) Henry Picard	10,303
1938	(United States) Sam Snead	19,534
1937	(United States) Harry Cooper	14,139
1936	(United States) Horton Smith	7,682
1935	(United States) Johnny Revolta	9,543
1934	(United States) Paul Runyan	6,767
1916–1933: No information known

=== Multiple winners ===
Rank	Player	Wins	Years won
1	(United States) Tiger Woods	10	1997, 1999, 2000, 2001, 2002, 2005, 2006, 2007, 2009, 2013
2	(United States) Jack Nicklaus	8	1964, 1965, 1967, 1971, 1972, 1973, 1975, 1976
T3	(United States) Ben Hogan	5	1940, 1941, 1942, 1946, 1948
T3	(United States) Tom Watson	5	1977, 1978, 1979, 1980, 1984
T5	(United States) Arnold Palmer	4	1958, 1960, 1962, 1963
T5	(United States) Scottie Scheffler	4	2021–22, 2022–23, 2024, 2025
T7	(Australia) Greg Norman	3	1986, 1990, 1995
T7	(Fiji) Vijay Singh	3	2003, 2004, 2008
T7	(United States) Sam Snead	3	1938, 1949, 1950
T7	(United States) Curtis Strange	3	1985, 1987, 1988
T7	(United States) Justin Thomas	3	2016–17, 2017–18, 2019–20
T12	(United States) Julius Boros	2	1952, 1955
T12	(United States) Billy Casper	2	1966, 1968
T12	(United States) Tom Kite	2	1981, 1989
T12	(Northern Ireland) Rory McIlroy	2	2012, 2013–14
T12	(United States) Byron Nelson	2	1944, 1945
T12	(Zimbabwe) Nick Price	2	1993, 1994

== Player and rookie of the year awards ==
=== PGA Tour Player of the Year ===
The PGA Tour Player of the Year award, also known as the Jack Nicklaus Trophy, is administered by the PGA Tour and was introduced in 1990; the recipient is selected by the tour players by ballot, although the results are not released other than to say who has won. More often than not the same player wins both awards; in fact, as seen in the table below, the PGA and PGA Tour Players of the Year have been the same every year from 1992 through 2018.

=== PGA Player of the Year ===
The PGA Player of the Year award dates back to 1948 (originally named the PGA Golfer of the Year) and was awarded by the PGA of America. From 1982 to 2022, the winner has been selected using a points system with points awarded for wins, money list position and scoring average. The award was last given in 2022.

=== Rookie of the Year ===
The Rookie of the Year award was also introduced in 1990. Players are eligible in their first season of PGA Tour membership if they competed in less than seven events from any prior season. Several of the winners had a good deal of international success before their PGA Tour rookie season, and some have been in their thirties when they won the award.

=== PGA Tour Courage Award ===
In March 2012, a new award, the PGA Tour Courage Award, was introduced in replacement of the defunct Comeback Player of the Year award. The award recognizes talents that have battled with “extraordinary adversity such as personal tragedy or debilitating injury or illness” and have overcome the adversity “to make a significant and meaningful contribution to the game of golf.”

=== Winners ===
Season	PGA Tour Player of the Year	PGA Player of the Year	Rookie of the Year	PGA Tour Courage Award
2025	(United States) Scottie Scheffler (4)	No award	(South Africa) Aldrich Potgieter	No award
2024	(United States) Scottie Scheffler (3)	No award	(United States) Nick Dunlap	(United States) Gary Woodland
2022–23	(United States) Scottie Scheffler (2)	No award	(United States) Eric Cole	(United States) Chris Kirk
2021–22	(United States) Scottie Scheffler	(Australia) Cameron Smith	(United States) Cameron Young	D.J. Gregory
2020–21	(United States) Patrick Cantlay	(Spain) Jon Rahm	(United States) Will Zalatoris	No award
2019–20	(United States) Dustin Johnson (2)	(United States) Justin Thomas (2)	(United States) Scottie Scheffler	(United States) Morgan Hoffmann
2018–19	(Northern Ireland) Rory McIlroy (3)	(United States) Brooks Koepka (2)	(South Korea) Im Sung-jae	No award
2017–18	(United States) Brooks Koepka	(United States) Brooks Koepka	(United States) Aaron Wise	No award
2016–17	(United States) Justin Thomas	(United States) Justin Thomas	(United States) Xander Schauffele	(United States) Gene Sauers
2015–16	(United States) Dustin Johnson	(United States) Dustin Johnson	(Argentina) Emiliano Grillo	No award
2014–15	(United States) Jordan Spieth	(United States) Jordan Spieth	(United States) Daniel Berger	(Australia) Jarrod Lyle
2013–14	(Northern Ireland) Rory McIlroy (2)	(Northern Ireland) Rory McIlroy (2)	(United States) Chesson Hadley	No award
2013	(United States) Tiger Woods (11)	(United States) Tiger Woods (11)	(United States) Jordan Spieth	(United States) Erik Compton
2012	(Northern Ireland) Rory McIlroy	(Northern Ireland) Rory McIlroy	(United States) John Huh	No award
2011	(England) Luke Donald	(England) Luke Donald	(United States) Keegan Bradley	No award
Year	PGA Tour Player of the Year	PGA Player of the Year	PGA Tour Rookie of the Year	Comeback Player of the Year
2010	(United States) Jim Furyk	(United States) Jim Furyk	(United States) Rickie Fowler	(Australia) Stuart Appleby
2009	(United States) Tiger Woods (10)	(United States) Tiger Woods (10)	(Australia) Marc Leishman	No award
2008	(Republic of Ireland) Pádraig Harrington	(Republic of Ireland) Pádraig Harrington	(Argentina) Andrés Romero	(United States) Dudley Hart
2007	(United States) Tiger Woods (9)	(United States) Tiger Woods (9)	(United States) Brandt Snedeker	(United States) Steve Stricker (2)
2006	(United States) Tiger Woods (8)	(United States) Tiger Woods (8)	(South Africa) Trevor Immelman	(United States) Steve Stricker
2005	(United States) Tiger Woods (7)	(United States) Tiger Woods (7)	(United States) Sean O'Hair	(United States) Olin Browne
2004	(Fiji) Vijay Singh	(Fiji) Vijay Singh	(United States) Todd Hamilton	(United States) John Daly
2003	(United States) Tiger Woods (6)	(United States) Tiger Woods (6)	(United States) Ben Curtis	(United States) Peter Jacobsen
2002	(United States) Tiger Woods (5)	(United States) Tiger Woods (5)	(United States) Jonathan Byrd	(United States) Gene Sauers
2001	(United States) Tiger Woods (4)	(United States) Tiger Woods (4)	(United States) Charles Howell III	(United States) Joe Durant
2000	(United States) Tiger Woods (3)	(United States) Tiger Woods (3)	(United States) Michael Clark II	(United States) Paul Azinger
1999	(United States) Tiger Woods (2)	(United States) Tiger Woods (2)	(Paraguay) Carlos Franco	(United States) Steve Pate
1998	(United States) Mark O'Meara	(United States) Mark O'Meara	(United States) Steve Flesch	(United States) Scott Verplank
1997	(United States) Tiger Woods	(United States) Tiger Woods	(United States) Stewart Cink	(United States) Bill Glasson
1996	(United States) Tom Lehman	(United States) Tom Lehman	(United States) Tiger Woods	(United States) Steve Jones
1995	(Australia) Greg Norman	(Australia) Greg Norman	(United States) Woody Austin	(United States) Bob Tway
1994	(Zimbabwe) Nick Price (2)	(Zimbabwe) Nick Price (2)	(South Africa) Ernie Els	(United States) Hal Sutton
1993	(Zimbabwe) Nick Price	(Zimbabwe) Nick Price	(Fiji) Vijay Singh	(United States) Howard Twitty
1992	(United States) Fred Couples (2)	(United States) Fred Couples	(United States) Mark Carnevale	(United States) John Cook
1991	(United States) Fred Couples	(United States) Corey Pavin	(United States) John Daly	(United States) Bruce Fleisher and (United States) D. A. Weibring (shared)
1990	(United States) Wayne Levi	(England) Nick Faldo	(United States) Robert Gamez	No award
1989	No award	(United States) Tom Kite	(United States) Bob Estes	No award
1988	No award	(United States) Curtis Strange	(United States) Jim Benepe	No award
1987	No award	(United States) Paul Azinger	(United States) Keith Clearwater	No award
1986	No award	(United States) Bob Tway	(United States) Brian Claar	No award
1985	No award	(United States) Lanny Wadkins	(United States) Phil Blackmar	No award
1984	No award	(United States) Tom Watson (6)	(United States) Corey Pavin	No award
1983	No award	(United States) Hal Sutton	No award	No award
1982	No award	(United States) Tom Watson (5)	(United States) Hal Sutton	No award
1981	No award	(United States) Bill Rogers	(United States) Mark O'Meara	No award
1980	No award	(United States) Tom Watson (4)	(United States) Gary Hallberg	No award
1979	No award	(United States) Tom Watson (3)	(United States) John Fought	No award
1978	No award	(United States) Tom Watson (2)	No award	No award
1977	No award	(United States) Tom Watson	No award	No award
1976	No award	(United States) Jack Nicklaus (5)	No award	No award
1975	No award	(United States) Jack Nicklaus (4)	No award	No award
1974	No award	(United States) Johnny Miller	No award	No award
1973	No award	(United States) Jack Nicklaus (3)	No award	No award
1972	No award	(United States) Jack Nicklaus (2)	No award	No award
1971	No award	(United States) Lee Trevino	No award	No award
1970	No award	(United States) Billy Casper (2)	No award	No award
1969	No award	(United States) Orville Moody	No award	No award
1968	No award	No award (Note: No award was presented in 1968 due to the rift between the PGA of America and the professional golfers on the PGA Tour.)	No award	No award
1967	No award	(United States) Jack Nicklaus	No award	No award
1966	No award	(United States) Billy Casper	No award	No award
1965	No award	(United States) Dave Marr	No award	No award
1964	No award	(United States) Ken Venturi	No award	No award
1963	No award	(United States) Julius Boros (2)	No award	No award
1962	No award	(United States) Arnold Palmer (2)	No award	No award
1961	No award	(United States) Jerry Barber	No award	No award
1960	No award	(United States) Arnold Palmer	No award	No award
1959	No award	(United States) Art Wall Jr.	No award	No award
1958	No award	(United States) Dow Finsterwald	No award	No award
1957	No award	(United States) Dick Mayer	No award	No award
1956	No award	(United States) Jack Burke Jr.	No award	No award
1955	No award	(United States) Doug Ford	No award	No award
1954	No award	(United States) Ed Furgol	No award	No award
1953	No award	(United States) Ben Hogan (4)	No award	No award
1952	No award	(United States) Julius Boros	No award	No award
1951	No award	(United States) Ben Hogan (3)	No award	No award
1950	No award	(United States) Ben Hogan (2)	No award	No award
1949	No award	(United States) Sam Snead	No award	No award
1948	No award	(United States) Ben Hogan	No award	No award

=== Multiple Player of the Year Awards ===
The following players have won more than one PGA Player of the Year Award through 2022:

- 11: Tiger Woods
- 6: Tom Watson
- 5: Jack Nicklaus
- 4: Ben Hogan
- 2: Julius Boros, Billy Casper, Brooks Koepka, Rory McIlroy, Arnold Palmer, Nick Price, Justin Thomas

The following players have won more than one PGA Tour Player of the Year Award through 2025 (first awarded in 1990):

- 11: Tiger Woods
- 4: Scottie Scheffler
- 3: Rory McIlroy
- 2: Fred Couples, Dustin Johnson, Nick Price

== Career money leaders ==
The top ten career money leaders on the tour as of the 2026 season are as follows:

Position	Player	Prize money ($)
1	(United States) Scottie Scheffler	130,390,661
2	(United States) Tiger Woods	120,999,166
3	(Northern Ireland) Rory McIlroy	119,555,515
4	(England) Justin Rose	79,356,373
5	(Australia) Adam Scott	74,880,596
6	(United States) Justin Thomas	74,568,294
7	(United States) Jim Furyk	71,507,269
8	(Fiji) Vijay Singh	71,312,738
9	(United States) Xander Schauffele	70,124,484
10	(United States) Jordan Spieth	69,044,203

A complete list updated weekly is available on the PGA Tour's website. Phil Mickelson ($96.7M) and Dustin Johnson ($75.7M) were dropped from this list after being suspended from the tour.

Due to increases in prize funds over the years, this list consists entirely of current players. The figures are not the players' complete career prize money as they do not include FedEx Cup bonuses, winnings from unofficial money events, or earnings on other tours such as the European Tour. In addition, elite golfers often earn several times as much from endorsements and golf-related business interests as they do from prize money.

Tiger Woods held the top spot on the list from February 13, 2000 until August 30, 2026, when he was surpassed by Scottie Scheffler.

== Commissioners ==
No.	Name	Service	Years
1	Joe Dey	1969–1974	5
2	Deane Beman	1974–1994	20
3	Tim Finchem	1994–2017	23
4	Jay Monahan	2017–	

== See also ==
- Golf in the United States
- Professional golf tours
- List of golfers with most PGA Tour wins
- List of golfers with most wins in one PGA Tour event
- Most PGA Tour wins in a year
- Vardon Trophy
