= List of American Arnold Palmer Cup golfers =

This is a list of all the American golfers who have played in the Arnold Palmer Cup through 2026. The Arnold Palmer Cup was known as the Palmer Cup until 2015.

== Players ==
=== Women ===
- Amari Avery 2022, 2023
- Addie Baggarly 2020
- Kaylee Benton 2019
- Amely Bochaton 2026
- Zoe Campos 2023, 2024
- Abbey Carlson 2019
- Jennifer Chang 2019
- Kylie Chong 2026
- Hailee Cooper 2019
- Allisen Corpuz 2020, 2021
- Anna Davis 2024, 2025, 2026
- Maisie Filler 2024
- Jamie Freedman 2018
- Mariel Galdiano 2018, 2019
- Megha Ganne 2025
- Allyson Geer 2020
- Kristen Gillman 2018
- Melanie Green 2024
- Haylee Harford 2019
- Hanna Harrison 2021
- Lauren Hartlage 2021
- Rachel Heck 2022
- Jaime Jacob 2020
- Julia Johnson 2020, 2021
- Gurleen Kaur 2022
- Dylan Kim 2018, 2019
- Gina Kim 2020, 2021
- Irene Kim 2021
- Jasmine Koo 2025, 2026
- Chloe Kovelesky 2026
- Rachel Kuehn 2020, 2021, 2022, 2023, 2024
- Jennifer Kupcho 2018
- Stephanie Lau 2019
- Andrea Lee 2018
- Mackenzie Lee 2026
- Antonia Malate 2022, 2023
- Isabella McCauley 2025
- Ashley Menne 2023
- Brooke Matthews 2021
- Emilia Migliaccio/Doran 2018, 2019, 2020, 2021, 2023
- Olivia Mitchell 2022, 2023
- Anna Morgan 2022, 2024
- Mary Kelly Mulcahy 2024, 2025
- Malia Nam 2019
- Lauryn Nguyen 2025
- Farah O'Keefe 2024, 2025, 2026
- Kaitlyn Papp 2018, 2019, 2020
- Ashleigh Park 2023
- Catherine Park 2024, 2025
- Jennie Park 2023
- Ann Parmerter 2019
- Macy Pate 2025, 2026
- Megan Propeck 2026
- Kiara Romero 2024, 2025, 2026
- Calynne Rosholt 2022
- Amanda Sambach 2023, 2024
- Megan Schofill 2020, 2023
- Sophia Schubert 2018
- Brooke Seay 2022
- Erica Shepherd 2021, 2022
- Bailey Shoemaker 2026
- Kate Smith 2021
- Lauren Stephenson 2018
- Latanna Stone 2020, 2021, 2022, 2024
- Kendall Todd 2025
- Alana Uriell 2018
- Lilia Vu 2018
- Crystal Wang 2023
- Avery Weed 2026
- Kenzie Wright 2020
- Kelly Xu 2025
- Rose Zhang 2022

=== Men ===
- Kihei Akina 2026
- Anders Albertson 2015
- Tyson Alexander 2010
- Cole Anderson 2023
- Jeremy Anderson 1998, 1999
- John Augenstein 2019, 2020
- Ryan Baca 2006
- Carson Bacha 2025
- Shintaro Ban 2018
- Blayne Barber 2011, 2012
- Derek Bard 2016
- Zach Bauchou 2018
- Sam Bennett 2021, 2022
- Daniel Berger 2013
- Ryan Blaum 2005, 2006
- Dustin Bray 2003
- Michael Brennan 2022
- Jacob Bridgeman 2021
- Jonathan Brightwell 2020
- Sam Burns 2017
- Jonathan Byrd 1999, 2000
- Patrick Cantlay 2011
- Alex Carpenter 2011, 2013
- Nick Cassini 2000, 2001
- Ricky Castillo 2020, 2021
- Roberto Castro 2005, 2006
- Bud Cauley 2009
- Kevin Chappell 2008
- John Chin 2010
- David Chung 2010
- Wyndham Clark 2014
- Erik Compton 2001
- Pierceson Coody 2020, 2021
- John Coultas 2017
- Ryder Cowan 2026
- Sean Crocker 2017
- Quade Cummins 2019, 2020
- Ben Curtis 1999
- Sean Dale 2013
- Brad Dalke 2018
- Charlie Danielson 2016
- Bryson DeChambeau 2014
- Alistair Docherty 2016
- Jake Doggett 2022
- Cooper Dossey 2020
- Adam Duncan 2025
- Austin Eckroat 2019
- Brad Elder 1997
- John Engler 1999, 2000, 2001
- Wheaton Ennis 2026
- James Erkenbeck 2013
- Derek Ernst 2012
- Matt Every 2004, 2005
- Ethan Fang 2025
- Derek Fathauer 2008
- Jack Ferguson 2004
- Erik Flores 2009
- David Ford 2023, 2024
- Maxwell Ford 2024
- Rickie Fowler 2008
- Stephen Franken 2018
- Nick Gabrelcik 2021, 2022, 2023
- Doug Ghim 2016, 2017
- Josiah Gilbert 2025, 2026
- Ian Gilligan 2024
- Lucas Glover 2000, 2001
- Aaron Goldberg 2008
- Will Gordon 2016, 2019
- Austin Greaser 2023
- Will Grimmer 2019
- Bill Haas 2002, 2003
- Chesson Hadley 2008
- Brandon Hagy 2014
- Ryan Hall 2021
- Cole Hammer 2019
- Nick Hardy 2017
- Brian Harman 2006, 2007
- Jason Hartwick 2003, 2004
- Russell Henley 2010, 2011
- J. J. Henry 1998
- Max Herendeen 2025, 2026
- Derek Hitchner 2023
- Rico Hoey 2014, 2016
- Morgan Hoffmann 2009
- J. B. Holmes 2005
- Billy Horschel 2007, 2008
- Beau Hossler 2015
- Charles Howell III 1998
- Brian Hull 1997
- Billy Hurley III 2004
- Ryan Hybl 2002
- Palmer Jackson 2022
- J. J. Jakovac 2004
- Ben James 2023, 2024
- William Jennings 2026
- Dustin Johnson 2007
- Michael Johnson 2016
- Stewart Jolly 2014
- Kyle Jones 2015
- Evan Katz 2020
- Johnny Keefer 2022
- Michael Kim 2013
- Chris Kirk 2006, 2007
- Jeff Klauk 2000, 2002
- Jackson Klutznick 2024
- Jackson Koivun 2024, 2025
- Joel Kribel 1997
- Matt Kuchar 1998, 1999
- Hank Kuehne 1998, 1999
- Peter Kuest 2019
- Tommy Kuhl 2023
- Doug LaBelle II 1998
- Scott Lander 2001
- Scott Langley 2010
- Kevin Larsen 2006
- Michael La Sasso 2024, 2025
- S.M. Lee 2018
- Walker Lee 2022
- Trent Leon 2009
- Spencer Levin 2005
- Luke List 2006, 2007
- Edward Loar 1998
- Jamie Lovemark 2007
- Jack Lundin 2024
- Anthony Maccaglia 2014
- Brock Mackenzie 2002
- Jack Maguire 2014, 2015
- Hunter Mahan 2002
- Patrick Martin 2019
- Lee McCoy 2015
- Jonathan McEwen 2026
- Maverick McNealy 2015, 2017
- Dylan Menante 2021, 2022
- Nahum Mendoza III 2016
- Daniel Miernicki 2010, 2011
- Andy Miller 2000
- Corbin Mills 2012
- Adam Mitchell 2008, 2009
- Jacob Modleski 2025, 2026
- Bryce Molder 1998, 1999, 2001
- Maxwell Moldovan 2023
- William Moll 2021
- Jonathan Moore 2007
- Ryan Moore 2003, 2004
- Collin Morikawa 2017, 2018
- Michael Morrison 1999
- Trey Mullinax 2014
- Corey Nagy 2010
- Chris Nallen 2003, 2004
- Trevor Norby 2021
- Alberto Ochoa 1997
- Clay Ogden 2006
- Ted Oh 1997
- Jeff Overton 2005
- John Pak 2020
- Chandler Phillips 2017, 2018, 2019
- Trent Phillips 2021
- Alex Price 2023
- Michael Putnam 2005
- Jeff Quinney 2001
- Cayden Pope 2026
- Jonathan Randolph 2010
- Garett Reband 2020
- Brad Reeves 2021
- Davis Riley 2018
- Patrick Rodgers 2012, 2013
- Matthew Rosenfeld 2005
- Adam Rubinson 2003
- Andy Sanders 2000
- Gordon Sargent 2022, 2023, 2024
- Ollie Schniederjans 2014, 2015
- Alex Scott 2019
- Robby Shelton 2014, 2015
- Cole Sherwood 2022
- Benjamin Shipp 2021
- Webb Simpson 2007
- Alex Smalley 2019
- Brandt Snedeker 2003
- Jimmy Stanger 2017
- Hunter Stewart 2015
- Preston Stout 2025
- Chris Stroud 2004
- Justin Suh 2018
- Preston Summerhays 2023, 2024
- Jase Summy 2025
- Caleb Surratt 2023
- Sahith Theegala 2018
- Justin Thomas 2012, 2013
- Davis Thompson 2020
- Michael Thompson 2008
- Michael Thorbjornsen 2022
- Braden Thornberry 2018
- Peter Tomasulo 2003
- D. J. Trahan 2002
- Cameron Tringale 2009
- Jack Turner 2025, 2026
- Brendan Valdes 2024
- Jackson Van Paris 2024
- Bo Van Pelt 1997
- Mike Van Sickle 2009
- Carr Vernon 2015
- Travis Vick 2022
- Arnond Vongvanij 2011
- Willy Walsh 2026
- Charles Warren 1997
- Nick Watney 2002
- Michael Weaver 2013
- James White 2012
- Cory Whitsett 2013
- Chris Williams 2011, 2012
- Connor Williams 2026
- Wells Williams 2025
- Lee Williamson 2002
- Chris Wisler 2000, 2001
- Matthew Wolff 2018
- Chris Wollmann 1997
- Zach Wright 2016
- Brandon Wu 2019
- Bobby Wyatt 2013
- Norman Xiong 2017
- Andrew Yun 2011, 2012
- Will Zalatoris 2016
- Zach Zediker 2020
- Steve Ziegler 2009

== See also ==
- Golf in the United States
- List of International Arnold Palmer Cup golfers
- Lists of golfers
