= 1998 Palmer Cup =

Team golf competition in Scotland

- Dates: 3–4 August 1998
- Venue: Old Course and New Course
- Location: St Andrews, Scotland
| (United Kingdom) (Republic of Ireland) | 12 | 12 | (United States) |
- A tie in the Palmer Cup

The 1998 Palmer Cup was held on 3–4 August 1998 on the Old Course and New Course at St Andrews, Scotland. The match was tied 12–12.

== Format ==
On Monday, there were four matches of four-ball in the morning, followed by four foursomes matches in the afternoon. Eight singles matches were played on the Tuesday morning with a further eight more in the afternoon.. In all, 24 matches were played.

Each of the 24 matches was worth one point in the larger team competition. If a match was all square after the 18th hole, each side earned half a point toward their team total. The team that accumulated at least 12½ points won the competition.

== Teams ==
Eight college golfers from the Great Britain and Ireland and the United States participated in the event.

Great Britain & Ireland
| Name | Country | College |
|---|---|---|
| Peter Dawson head coach | England | |
| Alistair Crinson team manager | England | |
| Luke Donald | England | Northwestern |
| Robert Duck | England | Augusta State |
| Max Harris | England | North Carolina |
| Oliver Lindsay | Scotland | St Andrews |
| Graeme Maly | England | St Andrews |
| Oliver Pughe | Wales | Wales |
| Rory Sabbatini | England | Arizona |
| Kyron Sullivan | Wales | Wales |

United States
| Name | College |
|---|---|
| Rod Myers head coach | Duke |
| Tim Brown team manager | Skidmore |
| Jeremy Anderson | UNLV |
| J. J. Henry | TCU |
| Charles Howell III | Oklahoma State |
| Matt Kuchar | Georgia Tech |
| Hank Kuehne | SMU |
| Doug LaBelle II | New Mexico |
| Edward Loar | Oklahoma State |
| Bryce Molder | Georgia Tech |

== Monday's matches ==
=== Morning four-ball ===
| & | Results |
|---|---|---|
| Donald/Duck | (United Kingdom) (Republic of Ireland) 1 up | Kuehne/Molder |
| Pughe/Sullivan | (United Kingdom) (Republic of Ireland) 3 & 2 | Anderson/Kuchar |
| Maly/Sabbatini | (United Kingdom) (Republic of Ireland) 2 & 1 | Howell/LaBelle |
| Harris/Lindsay | halved | Henry/Loar |
| 3½ | Four-ball | ½ |
| 3½ | Overall | ½ |

=== Afternoon foursomes ===
| & | Results |
|---|---|---|
| Pughe/Sullivan | (United States) 5 & 3 | Kuchar/Molder |
| Donald/Duck | (United Kingdom) (Republic of Ireland) 1 up | Anderson/Howell |
| Maly/Sabbatini | (United States) 1 up | LaBelle/Loar |
| Harris/Lindsay | (United Kingdom) (Republic of Ireland) 4 & 3 | Henry/Kuehne |
| 2 | Foursomes | 2 |
| 5½ | Overall | 2½ |

== Tuesday's matches ==
=== Morning singles ===
| & | Results |
|---|---|---|
| Kyron Sullivan | (United Kingdom) (Republic of Ireland) 1 up | Edward Loar |
| Rory Sabbatini | (United Kingdom) (Republic of Ireland) 2 & 1 | J. J. Henry |
| Oliver Lindsay | halved | Hank Kuehne |
| Max Harris | (United States) 4 & 3 | Jeremy Anderson |
| Robert Duck | (United States) 5 & 4 | Doug LaBelle II |
| Luke Donald | (United Kingdom) (Republic of Ireland) 2 up | Charles Howell III |
| Oliver Pughe | (United States) 1 up | Bryce Molder |
| Graeme Maly | (United Kingdom) (Republic of Ireland) 2 & 1 | Matt Kuchar |
| 4½ | Singles | 3½ |
| 10 | Overall | 6 |

=== Afternoon singles ===
| & | Results |
|---|---|---|
| Kyron Sullivan | (United States) 3 & 2 | Jeremy Anderson |
| Rory Sabbatini | (United Kingdom) (Republic of Ireland) 4 & 3 | Doug LaBelle II |
| Graeme Maly | (United States) 1 up | Charles Howell III |
| Luke Donald | (United States) 1 up | Hank Kuehne |
| Oliver Lindsay | halved | J. J. Henry |
| Oliver Pughe | (United States) 2 & 1 | Edward Loar |
| Robert Duck | (United States) 1 up | Matt Kuchar |
| Max Harris | halved | Bryce Molder |
| 2 | Singles | 6 |
| 12 | Overall | 12 |
