= 2001 Palmer Cup =

Golf competition in Springfield, New Jersey, United States

- Dates: June 27–28, 2001
- Venue: Baltusrol Golf Club
- Location: Springfield, New Jersey
(United States)	18	6	(United Kingdom) (Republic of Ireland)
- United States wins the Palmer Cup

The 2001 Palmer Cup was held on June 27–28, 2001 at the Baltusrol Golf Club, Springfield, New Jersey. The United States won 18 to 6.

== Format ==
On Wednesday, there were four matches of four-ball in the morning, followed by four foursomes matches in the afternoon. Eight singles matches were played on the Thursday morning with a further eight more in the afternoon. In all, 24 matches were played.

Each of the 24 matches was worth one point in the larger team competition. If a match was all square after the 18th hole, each side earned half a point toward their team total. The team that accumulated at least 12½ points won the competition.

== Teams ==
Eight college golfers from the United States and Great Britain and Ireland participated in the event.

United States
Name	College
Bob Ellis head coach	Texas A&M
Mark Simpson team manager	Colorado
Nick Cassini	Georgia
Erik Compton	Georgia
John Engler	Clemson
Lucas Glover	Clemson
Scott Lander	UNLV
Bryce Molder	Georgia Tech
Jeff Quinney	Arizona State
Chris Wisler	East Tennessee State

Great Britain & Ireland
Name	Country	College
Clive Brown team manager	Wales	
Jamie Elson	England	Augusta State
David Inglis	Scotland	Tulsa
Justin Kehoe	Ireland	University College Dublin
Graeme McDowell	Northern Ireland	UAB
Phil Rowe	England	Stanford
Kyron Sullivan	Wales	Wales
Oliver Wilson	England	Augusta State
Stuart Wilson	Scotland	Abertay Dundee

== Wednesday's matches ==
=== Morning four-ball ===
&	Results
Rowe/Sullivan	(United States) 4 & 3	Engler/Glover
Kehoe/McDowell	(United States) 4 & 3	Cassini/Lander
Elson/O. Wilson	halved	Quinney/Wisler
Inglis/S. Wilson	(United States) 1 up	Compton/Molder
½	Four-ball	3½
½	Overall	3½

=== Afternoon foursomes ===
&	Results
Elson/McDowell	(United States) 5 & 3	Cassini/Glover
Rowe/Sullivan	(United States) 5 & 3	Lander/Quinney
Kehoe/O. Wilson	(United States) 2 & 1	Engler/Wisler
Inglis/S. Wilson	(United Kingdom) (Republic of Ireland) 4 & 3	Compton/Molder
1	Foursomes	3
1½	Overall	6½

== Thursday's matches ==
=== Morning singles ===
&	Results
Graeme McDowell	halved	Bryce Molder
Jamie Elson	(United States) 3 & 2	Lucas Glover
David Inglis	(United States) 1 up	Nick Cassini
Stuart Wilson	(United States) 2 up	John Engler
Oliver Wilson	(United States) 4 & 2	Chris Wisler
Justin Kehoe	(United States) 6 & 4	Erik Compton
Kyron Sullivan	(United States) 1 up	Scott Lander
Phil Rowe	(United States) 6 & 5	Jeff Quinney
½	Singles	7½
2	Overall	14

=== Afternoon singles ===
&	Results
Graeme McDowell	(United Kingdom) (Republic of Ireland) 1 up	Lucas Glover
David Inglis	(United Kingdom) (Republic of Ireland) 2 up	Bryce Molder
Jamie Elson	(United States) 3 & 2	Jeff Quinney
Stuart Wilson	halved	Nick Cassini
Kyron Sullivan	(United States) 5 & 3	Erik Compton
Phil Rowe	halved	John Engler
Justin Kehoe	(United States) 6 & 5	Chris Wisler
Oliver Wilson	(United Kingdom) (Republic of Ireland) 3 & 2	Scott Lander
4	Singles	4
6	Overall	18
