= 1997 Palmer Cup =

Team golf competition in the United States

- Dates: July 10–12, 1997
- Venue: Bay Hill Club and Lodge
- Location: Orlando, Florida
(United States)	19	5	(United Kingdom) (Republic of Ireland)
- United States wins the Palmer Cup

The 1997 Palmer Cup was held on July 10–12, 1997 at Bay Hill Club and Lodge in Orlando, Florida. The United States won 19 to 5.

== Format ==
On Thursday, there were four matches of four-ball in the morning, followed by four foursomes matches in the afternoon. Eight singles matches were played on Friday, and eight more on Saturday.. In all, 24 matches were played.

Each of the 24 matches was worth one point in the larger team competition. If a match was all square after the 18th hole, each side earned half a point toward their team total. The team that accumulated at least 12½ points won the competition.

== Teams ==
Eight college golfers from the United States and Great Britain and Ireland participated in the event.

United States
Name	College
Dwaine Knight head coach	UNLV
Dick Spybey team manager	Alabama
Brad Elder	Texas
Brian Hull	Southern California
Joel Kribel	Stanford
Alberto Ochoa	TCU
Ted Oh	UNLV
Bo Van Pelt	Oklahoma State
Charles Warren	Clemson
Chris Wollmann	Ohio State

Great Britain & Ireland
Name	Country	College
Peter Dawson head coach	England	
Alistair Crinson team manager	England	
Richie Coughlan	Ireland	Clemson
Andrew Laurence	Scotland	UAB
Peter Lawrie	Ireland	Dublin
Martin Le Mesurier	England	Minnesota
Allan MacDonald	Scotland	Alabama
Keith Nolan	Ireland	East Tennessee State
Neil Steven	Scotland	Edinburgh
Andrew White	England	Emory

== Thursday's matches ==
=== Morning four-ball ===
&	Results
Nolan/Steven	(United States) 3 & 1	Elder/Van Pelt
MacDonald/White	(United States) 2 & 1	Hull/Kribel
Coughlan/Lawrie	(United Kingdom) (Republic of Ireland) 2 & 1	Warren/Wollmann
Laurence/Le Mesurier	(United States) 5 & 4	Ochoa/Oh
1	Four-ball	3
1	Overall	3

=== Afternoon foursomes ===
&	Results
Laurence/Le Mesurier	(United States) 2 & 1	Ochoa/Oh
Nolan/Steven	(United States) 5 & 4	Elder/Van Pelt
MacDonald/White	(United States) 4 & 3	Hull/Kribel
Coughlan/Lawrie	(United States) 7 & 6	Warren/Wollmann
0	Foursomes	4
1	Overall	7

== Friday's singles matches ==
&	Results
Richie Coughlan	(United States) 3 & 2	Bo Van Pelt
Andrew White	(United States) 2 & 1	Brad Elder
Keith Nolan	(United Kingdom) (Republic of Ireland) 3 & 2	Ted Oh
Peter Lawrie	halved	Chris Wollmann
Martin Le Mesurier	(United States) 4 & 2	Charles Warren
Allan MacDonald	(United States) 7 & 6	Brian Hull
Neil Steven	(United States) 4 & 2	Alberto Ochoa
Andrew Laurence	(United States) 2 up	Joel Kribel
1½	Singles	6½
2½	Overall	13½

== Saturday's singles matches ==
&	Results
Peter Lawrie	halved	Alberto Ochoa
Neil Steven	(United States) 4 & 2	Joel Kribel
Keith Nolan	(United Kingdom) (Republic of Ireland) 2 & 1	Brian Hull
Richie Coughlan	(United States) 4 & 2	Chris Wollmann
Martin Le Mesurier	(United States) 2 up	Ted Oh
Andrew Laurence	(United Kingdom) (Republic of Ireland) 1 up	Charles Warren
Allan MacDonald	(United States) 2 up	Bo Van Pelt
Andrew White	(United States) 1 up	Brad Elder
2½	Singles	5½
5	Overall	19
