= 2003 Palmer Cup =

Team golf competition in the United States

- Dates: July 10–11, 2003
- Venue: Cassique Course, Kiawah Island Club
- Location: Kiawah Island, South Carolina
(United States)	10	14	(Europe)
- Europe wins the Palmer Cup

The 2003 Palmer Cup was held on July 10–11, 2003 on the Cassique Course, Kiawah Island Club, Kiawah Island, South Carolina. Europe won 14 to 10. This was the first Palmer Cup in which qualification was extended to the whole of Europe.

== Format ==
The format was revised so that there were singles matches on both afternoons rather than two sessions of singles on the second day. On Thursday, there were four matches of four-ball in the morning, followed by eight singles matches in the afternoon. Four foursomes matches were played on the Friday morning with a further eight singles in the afternoon. In all, 24 matches were played.

Each of the 24 matches was worth one point in the larger team competition. If a match was all square after the 18th hole, each side earned half a point toward their team total. The team that accumulated at least 12 1/2 points won the competition.

== Teams ==
Eight college golfers from the United States and Europe participated in the event.

United States
Name	College
Bruce Heppler head coach	Georgia Tech
Joe Feaganes assistant coach	Marshall
Dustin Bray	North Carolina
Bill Haas	Wake Forest
Jason Hartwick	Texas
Ryan Moore	UNLV
Chris Nallen	Arizona
Adam Rubinson	TCU
Brandt Snedeker	Vanderbilt
Peter Tomasulo	California

Europe
Name	Country	College
Keith Williams head coach	Wales	
Peter Mattsson assistant coach	Scotland	
Alejandro Cañizares	Spain	Arizona State
Gonzalo Fernández-Castaño	Spain	San Pablo, Madrid
David Inglis	Scotland	Tulsa
Pär Nilsson	Sweden	Oklahoma State
David Price	Wales	Glamorgan
Wilhelm Schauman	Sweden	Minnesota
David Skinns	England	Tennessee
Oliver Wilson	England	Augusta State

== Thursday's matches ==
=== Morning four-ball ===
	Results
Cañizares/Wilson	(United States) 4 & 3	Haas/Nallen
Fdez-Castaño/Inglis	(United States) 2 & 1	Bray/Snedeker
Price/Skinns	(Europe) 1 up	Rubinson/Tomasulo
Nilsson/Schauman	(United States) 1 up	Hartwick/Moore
1	Four-ball	3
1	Overall	3

=== Afternoon singles ===
	Results
Gonzalo Fdez-Castaño	(Europe) 3 & 2	Bill Haas
Oliver Wilson	(Europe) 2 & 1	Chris Nallen
Alejandro Cañizares	(Europe) 1 up	Dustin Bray
David Inglis	(United States) 2 & 1	Brandt Snedeker
David Skinns	halved	Peter Tomasulo
Wilhelm Schauman	(Europe) 7 & 6	Adam Rubinson
David Price	(Europe) 3 & 1	Jason Hartwick
Pär Nilsson	halved	Ryan Moore
6	Singles	2
7	Overall	5

== Friday's matches ==
=== Morning foursomes ===
	Results
Cañizares/Fdez-Castaño	(Europe) 3 & 1	Haas/Nallen
Skinns/Wilson	(United States) 2 & 1	Bray/Snedeker
Nilsson/Schauman	halved	Rubinson/Tomasulo
Inglis/Price	(Europe) 1 up	Hartwick/Moore
2 1/2	Foursomes	1 1/2
9 1/2	Overall	6 1/2

=== Afternoon singles ===
	Results
Oliver Wilson	(United States) 2 & 1	Dustin Bray
Alejandro Cañizares	(Europe) 3 & 1	Brandt Snedeker
Gonzalo Fdez-Castaño	(Europe) 3 & 2	Bill Haas
David Skinns	(Europe) 1 up	Peter Tomasulo
Wilhelm Schauman	(United States) 2 & 1	Chris Nallen
Pär Nilsson	(Europe) 3 & 2	Ryan Moore
David Inglis	halved	Jason Hartwick
David Price	(United States) 2 & 1	Adam Rubinson
4 1/2	Singles	3 1/2
14	Overall	10

== Michael Carter award ==
The Michael Carter Award winners were Bill Haas and David Price.
