= 2015 Palmer Cup =

Team golf competition in the United States

- Dates: June 12–14, 2015
- Venue: Rich Harvest Farms
- Location: Big Rock Township, Illinois
(United States)	18	12	(Europe)
- United States wins the Palmer Cup

The 2015 Palmer Cup was held on June 12–14, 2015 at Rich Harvest Farms in Big Rock Township, Illinois. The United States won 18 to 12.

== Format ==
On Friday, there were five matches of foursomes in the morning, followed by five four-ball matches in the afternoon. Ten singles matches were played on Saturday, and ten more on Sunday. In all, 30 matches were played.

Each of the 30 matches was worth one point in the larger team competition. If a match was all square after the 18th hole, each side earned half a point toward their team total. The team that accumulated at least 15½ points won the competition.

== Teams ==
Ten college golfers from the United States and Europe participated in the event plus a non-playing head coach and assistant coach for each team.

Europe
Name	Country	Class	College	Qualification method
Jean van de Velde	France	non-playing head coach		
Janice Moodie	Scotland	non-playing assistant coach		
Jon Rahm	Spain	Jr.	Arizona State	1st in Arnold Palmer Cup Ranking
Max Rottluff	Germany	Jr.	Arizona State	2nd in Arnold Palmer Cup Ranking
Rowin Caron	Netherlands	Jr.	Florida State	3rd in Arnold Palmer Cup Ranking
Adrian Meronk	Poland	Jr.	East Tennessee State	4th in Arnold Palmer Cup Ranking
Clément Sordet	France	Sr.	Texas Tech	5th in Arnold Palmer Cup Ranking
Thomas Detry	Belgium	Jr.	Illinois	6th in Arnold Palmer Cup Ranking
Gary Hurley	Ireland	Sr.	Maynooth	Committee pick
Matthias Schwab	Austria	So.	Vanderbilt	Committee pick
Mathias Eggenberger	Switzerland	Jr.	Stirling	Winner of R&A Foundation Scholars Tournament
Pep Anglès	Spain	Sr.	Central Arkansas	Coach's pick

United States
Name	Class	College	Qualification method
Bruce Heppler	non-playing head coach		
Chris Hill	non-playing assistant coach		
Lee McCoy	Jr.	Georgia	1st in Arnold Palmer Cup Ranking
Maverick McNealy	So.	Stanford	2nd in Arnold Palmer Cup Ranking
Hunter Stewart	Sr.	Vanderbilt	3rd in Arnold Palmer Cup Ranking
Robby Shelton	So.	Alabama	4th in Arnold Palmer Cup Ranking
Jack Maguire	So.	Florida State	5th in Arnold Palmer Cup Ranking
Beau Hossler	So.	Texas	6th in Arnold Palmer Cup Ranking
Kyle Jones	Sr.	Baylor	Committee pick
Ollie Schniederjans	Sr.	Georgia Tech	Committee pick
Carr Vernon	Jr.	Cal State Monterey Bay	Committee pick, non-Division I
Anders Albertson	Sr.	Georgia Tech	Coach's pick

== Friday's matches ==
=== Morning foursomes ===
	Results
Detry/Rahm	(United States) 4 & 3	McCoy/Schniederjans
Rottluff/Schwab	(United States) 3 & 2	Jones/Vernon
Caron/Sordet	(United States) 3 & 2	Shelton/Stewart
Eggenberger/Hurley	(United States) 1 up	Albertson/Maguire
Anglès/Meronk	(Europe) 3 & 2	Hossler/McNealy
1	Foursomes	4
1	Overall	4

=== Afternoon four-ball ===
	Results
Detry/Meronk	(Europe) 4 & 3	McCoy/Schniederjans
Eggenberger/Hurley	(Europe) 3 & 2	Jones/Vernon
Caron/Sordet	(United States) 1 up	Shelton/Stewart
Rottluff/Schwab	(Europe) 2 & 1	Albertson/Maguire
Anglès/Rahm	(United States) 2 & 1	Hossler/McNealy
3	Four-ball	2
4	Overall	6

== Saturday's singles matches ==
	Results
Thomas Detry	(Europe) 5 & 4	Lee McCoy
Jon Rahm	(United States) 2 & 1	Ollie Schniederjans
Max Rottluff	(Europe) 1 up	Carr Vernon
Adrian Meronk	halved	Kyle Jones
Rowin Caron	(United States) 3 & 2	Robby Shelton
Mathias Eggenberger	(United States) 6 & 5	Hunter Stewart
Clément Sordet	(United States) 2 & 1	Anders Albertson
Gary Hurley	(United States) 6 & 5	Jack Maguire
Matthias Schwab	(United States) 1 up	Beau Hossler
Pep Anglès	(United States) 2 & 1	Maverick McNealy
2½	Singles	7½
6½	Overall	13½

== Sunday's singles matches ==
	Results
Clément Sordet	(Europe) 2 & 1	Anders Albertson
Thomas Detry	(United States) 4 & 3	Hunter Stewart
Pep Anglès	(United States) 2 & 1	Beau Hossler
Adrian Meronk	(Europe) 3 & 2	Maverick McNealy
Max Rottluff	(United States) 5 & 3	Ollie Schniederjans
Matthias Schwab	(Europe) 1 up	Carr Vernon
Gary Hurley	(Europe) 1 up	Jack Maguire
Rowin Caron	(Europe) 2 & 1	Kyle Jones
Mathias Eggenberger	(United States) 4 & 3	Robby Shelton
Jon Rahm	halved	Lee McCoy
5½	Singles	4½
12	Overall	18

== Michael Carter award ==
The Michael Carter Award winners were Hunter Stewart and Matthias Schwab.
