= 1999 Palmer Cup =

Amateur team golf tournament

- Dates: June 12–13, 1999
- Venue: Honors Course
- Location: Chattanooga, Tennessee
(United States)	17½	6½	(United Kingdom) (Republic of Ireland)
- United States wins the Palmer Cup

The 1999 Palmer Cup was held on June 12–13, 1999 on the Honors Course, Chattanooga, Tennessee. The United States won 17½ to 6½.

== Format ==
On Saturday, there were four matches of four-ball in the morning, followed by four foursomes matches in the afternoon. Eight singles matches were played on the Sunday morning with a further eight more in the afternoon. In all, 24 matches were played.

Each of the 24 matches was worth one point in the larger team competition. If a match was all square after the 18th hole, each side earned half a point toward their team total. The team that accumulated at least 12½ points won the competition.

== Teams ==
Eight college golfers from the United States and Great Britain and Ireland participated in the event.

United States
Name	College
Jim Brown head coach	Ohio State
Tim Brown team manager	Skidmore
Jeremy Anderson	UNLV
Jonathan Byrd	Clemson
Ben Curtis	Kent State
John Engler	Clemson
Hank Kuehne	SMU
Matt Kuchar	Georgia Tech
Bryce Molder	Georgia Tech
Michael Morrison	Georgia

Great Britain & Ireland
Name	Country	College
Alistair Crinson team manager	England	
Luke Donald	England	Northwestern
Johnny Foster	Northern Ireland	Ulster
Max Harris	England	North Carolina
Michael Hoey	Northern Ireland	Clemson
Oliver Lindsay	Scotland	St Andrews
Phil Rowe	England	Stanford
Kyron Sullivan	Wales	Wales
Andrew White	Scotland	St Andrews

== Saturday's matches ==
=== Morning four-ball ===
&	Results
Donald/Rowe	(United Kingdom) (Republic of Ireland) 4 & 3	Anderson/Kuchar
Foster/Hoey	(United States) 4 & 3	Engler/Molder
Harris/Sullivan	(United States) 3 & 2	Curtis/Byrd
Lindsay/White	(United States) 5 & 4	Kuehne/Morrison
1	Four-ball	3
1	Overall	3

=== Afternoon foursomes ===
&	Results
Donald/Harris	(United Kingdom) (Republic of Ireland) 2 & 1	Kuchar/Molder
Foster/Sullivan	(United Kingdom) (Republic of Ireland) 1 up	Curtis/Engler
Lindsay/White	(United States) 3 & 2	Byrd/Morrison
Hoey/Rowe	(United States) 3 & 2	Anderson/Kuehne
2	Foursomes	2
3	Overall	5

== Sunday's matches ==
=== Morning singles ===
&	Results
Phil Rowe	(United States) 1 up	Matt Kuchar
Luke Donald	(United Kingdom) (Republic of Ireland) 3 & 2	John Engler
Michael Hoey	(United States) 2 & 1	Bryce Molder
Kyron Sullivan	(United States) 2 & 1	Jeremy Anderson
Johnny Foster	(United States) 3 & 2	Ben Curtis
Oliver Lindsay	(United States) 6 & 4	Jonathan Byrd
Andrew White	(United States) 2 up	Michael Morrison
Max Harris	halved	Hank Kuehne
1½	Singles	6½
4½	Overall	11½

=== Afternoon singles ===
&	Results
Andrew White	(United Kingdom) (Republic of Ireland) 2 up	John Engler
Phil Rowe	(United States) 4 & 3	Matt Kuchar
Johnny Foster	(United States) 5 & 3	Michael Morrison
Kyron Sullivan	(United States) 5 & 4	Ben Curtis
Oliver Lindsay	(United States) 5 & 4	Jeremy Anderson
Max Harris	(United Kingdom) (Republic of Ireland) 3 & 1	Bryce Molder
Michael Hoey	(United States) 3 & 1	Jonathan Byrd
Luke Donald	(United States) 3 & 2	Hank Kuehne
2	Singles	6
6½	Overall	17½
