= David Skinns =

English professional golfer (born 1982)

Personal information
- Full name: David Andrew Skinns
- Nationality: England
- Born: 1 February 1982 (age 44) Lincoln, England
- Height: 6 ft 0 in (1.83 m)
- Weight: 175 lb (79 kg; 12.5 st)

Career
- Sport: Golf
- College: University of Tennessee
- Turned professional: 2005
- Current tour: PGA Tour
- Former tours: Korn Ferry Tour; PGA Tour Canada; NGA Hooters Tour
- Professional wins: 10

Number of wins by tour
- Korn Ferry Tour: 3
- Other: 7

David Andrew Skinns (born 1 February 1982) is an English professional golfer.

Skinns was born in Lincoln, England. He was the losing finalist in the 2000 Boys Amateur Championship. He attended the University of Tennessee and majored in psychology.

Skinns competed on the NGA Hooters Tour and won seven times on the tour between 2008 and 2012. He played in a number of event on the Web.com Tour in 2012 and 2014 and on the PGA Tour Canada in 2013, 2015 and 2016.

In 2017, Skinns started the season Web.com Tour season finale 115th on the money list. A T2 at the WinCo Foods Portland Open moved him to 58th. Skinns failed to earn a PGA Tour card, but was guaranteed full Web.com Tour status for the first time in his career. The next year, Skinns earned his first win on a major professional tour at the Pinnacle Bank Championship. He fell short again of qualifying for the PGA Tour, finishing 41st on the regular season money list and outside the top 25 in the Finals. Skinns won the same event in 2021, but this time, his win was enough to earn him a PGA Tour card.

== Professional wins (10) ==
=== Korn Ferry Tour wins (3) ===
No.	Date	Tournament	Winning score	To par	Margin of victory	Runner(s)-up
1	22 Jul 2018	Pinnacle Bank Championship	68-66-69-65=268	−16	2 strokes	(South Korea) Im Sung-jae
2	15 Aug 2021	Pinnacle Bank Championship (2)	67-67-69-67=270	−14	1 stroke	(China) Dou Zecheng, (United States) Jared Wolfe
3	26 Mar 2023	Club Car Championship	67-68-68-68=271	−17	1 stroke	(United States) Shad Tuten, (United States) Tom Whitney

Korn Ferry Tour playoff record (0–1)

No.	Year	Tournament	Opponents	Result
1	2021	TPC Colorado Championship	(United States) Tag Ridings, (Taiwan) Kevin Yu	Ridings won with par on second extra hole Yu eliminated by birdie on first hole

=== NGA Hooters Tour wins (7) ===
- 2008 Dothan Classic, First-Tee Inverrary Country Club Open, Base Camp Realty/Chesdin Landing Open
- 2011 River Islands Golf Club Classic
- 2012 Cutter Creek Golf Classic, Three Ridges NGA Knoxville Classic, NGA Tour Classic at Achasta

== Results in The Players Championship ==
Tournament	2025
The Players Championship	CUT

CUT = missed the half-way cut

== Team appearances ==
Amateur

- Men's Home Internationals (representing England): 2000 – 2006
- European Youths' Team Championship (representing England): 2002
- Palmer Cup (representing Europe): 2003 (winners), 2005

== See also ==
- 2021 Korn Ferry Tour Finals graduates
- 2023 Korn Ferry Tour graduates
