= 2002 Palmer Cup =

Team golf competition in Ireland

- Dates: 11–12 July 2002
- Venue: Doonbeg Golf Club
- Location: County Clare, Ireland
(United Kingdom) (Republic of Ireland)	8 1/2	15 1/2	(United States)
- United States wins the Palmer Cup

The 2002 Palmer Cup was held on 11–12 July 2002 at Doonbeg Golf Club in County Clare, Ireland. The United States won 15 1/2–8 1/2.

== Format ==
On Thursday, there were four matches of four-ball in the morning, followed by four foursomes matches in the afternoon. Eight singles matches were played on the Friday morning with a further eight more in the afternoon.. In all, 24 matches were played.

Each of the 24 matches was worth one point in the larger team competition. If a match was all square after the 18th hole, each side earned half a point toward their team total. The team that accumulated at least 12 1/2 points won the competition.

== Teams ==
Eight college golfers from the Great Britain and Ireland and the United States participated in the event.

Great Britain & Ireland
Name	Country	College
David Ridley head coach	England	
Paul Ashwell team manager	England	
Geoff Harris	England	Old Dominion
Justin Kehoe	Ireland	University College Dublin
Stuart Manley	Wales	West Florida
Phil Rowe	England	Stanford
Andy Smith	England	Southeastern Louisiana
Justin Walters	England	North Carolina State
Oliver Wilson	England	Augusta State
Stuart Wilson	Scotland	Abertay Dundee

United States
Name	College
Chris Haack head coach	Georgia
Mark Simpson team manager	Colorado
Bill Haas	Wake Forest
Ryan Hybl	Georgia
John Klauk	Texas
Brock Mackenzie	Washington
Hunter Mahan	Oklahoma State
D. J. Trahan	Clemson
Nick Watney	Fresno State
Lee Williamson	Purdue

== Thursday's matches ==
=== Morning four-ball ===
&	Results
Rowe/O. Wilson	(United Kingdom) (Republic of Ireland) 1 up	Mackenzie/Watney
Smith/Walters	(United Kingdom) (Republic of Ireland) 6 & 4	Hybl/Williamson
Harris/Manley	(United States) 1 up	Klauk/Mahan
Kehoe/S. Wilson	(United States) 1 up	Haas/Trahan
2	Four-ball	2
2	Overall	2

=== Afternoon foursomes ===
&	Results
Rowe/O. Wilson	halved	Hybl/Williamson
Smith/Walters	(United States) 6 & 4	Mackenzie/Watney
Harris/Manley	(United Kingdom) (Republic of Ireland) 5 & 4	Klauk/Mahan
Kehoe/S. Wilson	(United States) 2 & 1	Haas/Trahan
1 1/2	Foursomes	2 1/2
3 1/2	Overall	4 1/2

== Friday's matches ==
=== Morning singles ===
&	Results
Oliver Wilson	(United States) 2 up	Bill Haas
Phil Rowe	(United States) 1 up	Nick Watney
Geoff Harris	(United States) 2 up	John Klauk
Stuart Manley	halved	Ryan Hybl
Stuart Wilson	halved	Brock Mackenzie
Andy Smith	(United States) 3 & 2	Lee Williamson
Justin Walters	(United Kingdom) (Republic of Ireland) 2 & 1	Hunter Mahan
Justin Kehoe	(United States) 3 & 2	D. J. Trahan
2	Singles	6
5 1/2	Overall	10 1/2

=== Afternoon singles ===
&	Results
Oliver Wilson	(United States) 2 up	Bill Haas
Phil Rowe	(United States) 1 up	Nick Watney
Justin Kehoe	(United Kingdom) (Republic of Ireland) 3 & 1	John Klauk
Justin Walters	(United States) 7 & 6	Ryan Hybl
Stuart Wilson	halved	Brock Mackenzie
Stuart Manley	halved	Lee Williamson
Andy Smith	halved	Hunter Mahan
Geoff Harris	halved	D. J. Trahan
3	Singles	5
8 1/2	Overall	15 1/2

== Michael Carter award ==
The Michael Carter Award was inaugurated in 2002. On 13 February 2002, former Penn State University golfer Michael Carter died in an automobile accident at the age of 19. "The Michael Carter "Junior" Memorial Award is presented to the Arnold Palmer Cup participant from each team who best represents the qualities and ideals that made this young man unique."

The first winners were Justin Walters.and Bill Haas.
