= 2011 Palmer Cup =

Team golf competition in the United States

- Dates: June 9–11, 2011
- Venue: The Stanwich Club
- Location: Greenwich, Connecticut
(United States)	13	11	(Europe)
- United States wins the Palmer Cup

The 2011 Palmer Cup was held on June 9–11, 2011 at The Stanwich Club, Greenwich, Connecticut. The United States won 13 to 11.

== Format ==
On Thursday, there were four matches of four-ball in the morning, followed by eight singles matches in the afternoon. Four foursomes matches were played on the Friday morning with a further eight singles in the afternoon. In all, 24 matches were played.

Each of the 24 matches was worth one point in the larger team competition. If a match was all square after the 18th hole, each side earned half a point toward their team total. The team that accumulated at least 12½ points won the competition.

== Teams ==
Eight college golfers from the United States and Europe participated in the event.

United States
Name	College
Tim Poe head coach	Central Missouri
Michael Burcin assistant coach	South Carolina
Blayne Barber	Auburn
Patrick Cantlay	UCLA
Alex Carpenter	Abilene Christian
Russell Henley	Georgia
Daniel Miernicki	Oregon
Arnond Vongvanij	Florida
Chris Williams	Washington
Andrew Yun	Stanford

Europe
Name	Country	College
Rickard Lindberg head coach	Sweden	
David Ingles assistant coach	Scotland	Northwestern
Sebastian Cappelen	Denmark	Arkansas
Nacho Elvira	Spain	Texas A&M
Nils Florén	Sweden	Texas Tech
Jeff Karlsson	Sweden	Kennesaw State
Robert S. Karlsson	Sweden	Liberty
Henrik Norlander	Sweden	Augusta State
Nick Macandrew	Scotland	Aberdeen
Pontus Widegren	Sweden	UCLA

== Thursday's matches ==
=== Morning four-ball ===
	Results
Cappelen/Elvira	(United States) 2 & 1	Vongvanij/Yun
Florén/J. Karlsson	(Europe) 4 & 2	Cantlay/Carpenter
R. Karlsson/Macandrew	(United States) 4 & 3	Miernicki/Williams
Norlander/Widegren	(United States) 3 & 2	Barber/Henley
1	Four-ball	3
1	Overall	3

=== Afternoon foursomes ===
	Results
Florén/Macandrew	(United States) 5 & 4	Vongvanij/Yun
Cappelen/Elvira	(Europe) 5 & 3	Barber/Carpenter
J. Karlsson/R. Karlsson	halved	Miernicki/Williams
Norlander/Widegren	(Europe) 5 & 4	Cantlay/Henley
2½	Foursomes	1½
3½	Overall	4½

== Friday's singles matches ==
	Results
Pontus Widegren	(Europe) 6 & 4	Arnond Vongvanij
Nick Macandrew	(United States) 7 & 6	Andrew Yun
Nils Florén	(Europe) 3 & 2	Daniel Miernicki
Jeff Karlsson	(Europe) 2 & 1	Alex Carpenter
Robert S. Karlsson	halved	Patrick Cantlay
Sebastian Cappelen	(Europe) 1 up	Russell Henley
Nacho Elvira	halved	Chris Williams
Henrik Norlander	(United States) 2 & 1	Blayne Barber
5	Singles	3
8½	Overall	7½

== Saturday's singles matches ==
	Results
Nick Macandrew	(United States) 3 & 1	Patrick Cantlay
Nils Florén	(Europe) 4 & 2	Alex Carpenter
Jeff Karlsson	(United States) 6 & 5	Arnond Vongvanij
Robert S. Karlsson	(United States) 5 & 3	Daniel Miernicki
Sebastian Cappelen	(Europe) 1 up	Russell Henley
Nacho Elvira	halved	Blayne Barber
Henrik Norlander	(United States) 3 & 2	Chris Williams
Pontus Widegren	(United States) 1 up	Andrew Yun
2½	Singles	5½
11	Overall	13

== Michael Carter award ==
The Michael Carter Award winners were Russell Henley and Nacho Elvira.
