= Kristoffer Ventura =

Norwegian professional golfer (born 1995)

Personal information
- Full name: Kristoffer Evensen Ventura
- Nationality: Norway
- Born: 24 February 1995 (age 31) Puebla, Mexico
- Height: 6 ft 3 in (191 cm)
- Weight: 180 lb (82 kg)

Career
- Sport: Golf
- College: Oklahoma State University
- Turned professional: 2018
- Current tour: PGA Tour
- Former tour: Korn Ferry Tour
- Professional wins: 2

Number of wins by tour
- Korn Ferry Tour: 2

Kristoffer Evensen Ventura (born 24 February 1995) is a Norwegian professional golfer who plays on the PGA Tour.

== Amateur career ==
Born in Puebla, Mexico to a Mexican father and Norwegian mother, Ventura spent his first years in Mexico before moving to Rygge, Norway, aged 12. As an amateur, he represented Norway at the 2012 and 2016 Eisenhower Trophy, and represented Europe in the 2010 Junior Ryder Cup and the Continent of Europe in the 2011 and 2013 Jacques Léglise Trophy. He was runner-up at the 2011 European Young Masters and won the 2011 French International Boys Championship and the 2012 French Boys Championship. He attended the WANG Toppidrett Golf School in Oslo, before playing collegiate golf at Oklahoma State University where he was teammates with Viktor Hovland and Matthew Wolff and member of the 2018 NCAA Division I Men's Golf Championship team.

== Professional career ==
In November 2018, just before final stage of Korn Ferry Tour Qualifying Tournament, Ventura was forced to have an emergency appendectomy. He competed in the event, despite not being able to swing fully, and finished near the bottom, entering the 2019 Korn Ferry Tour season with minimal status. He won the Utah Championship and Pinnacle Bank Championship and earned PGA Tour membership by finishing fourth on the Korn Ferry Tour regular season points list, entering the 2020 PGA Tour 14th in the final priority ranking. After a few weeks on the PGA Tour he moved into the top 150 on the Official World Golf Ranking in October 2019.

After two top-5 finishes on the PGA Tour in 2026, Ventura shot a final round 63 to finish runner-up at the VidantaWorld Mexico Open, behind Andrew Novak.

== Amateur wins ==
- 2011 Trophee Carlhian (French International Boys Championship), Titleist Tour 2
- 2012 French Boys Championship, Norgesmesterskapet
- 2013 Team Norway Junior Tour 8 Superfinale
- 2014 Titleist Tour 3, International Trophy
- 2016 The Aggie Invitational, NCAA Stillwater Regional
- 2018 Big 12 Championship

== Professional wins (2) ==
=== Korn Ferry Tour wins (2) ===
No.	Date	Tournament	Winning score	Margin of victory	Runner(s)-up
1	30 Jun 2019	Utah Championship	−14 (69-70-66-65=270)	Playoff	(United States) Joshua Creel
2	21 Jul 2019	Pinnacle Bank Championship	−16 (67-64-67-70=268)	2 strokes	(United States) Andres Gonzales, (United States) Chad Ramey

Korn Ferry Tour playoff record (1–1)

No.	Year	Tournament	Opponent	Result
1	2019	Utah Championship	(United States) Joshua Creel	Won with par on third extra hole
2	2024	Visa Argentina Open	(United States) Mason Andersen	Lost to birdie on second extra hole

== Results in The Players Championship ==
Tournament	2021	2022	2023	2024	2025
The Players Championship	CUT				CUT

Did not play

CUT = missed the halfway cut

== Team appearances ==
Amateur

- European Boys' Team Championship (representing Norway): 2010, 2011, 2012, 2013
- Junior Ryder Cup (representing Europe): 2010
- Eisenhower Trophy (representing Norway): 2012, 2016
- Jacques Léglise Trophy (representing the Continent of Europe): 2011, 2013
- European Amateur Team Championship (representing Norway): 2016, 2017
- Arnold Palmer Cup (representing Europe): 2017

== See also ==
- 2019 Korn Ferry Tour Finals graduates
- 2024 Korn Ferry Tour graduates
