= 2005 Palmer Cup =

Team golf competition in the United States

- Dates: June 8–9, 2005
- Venue: Irish Course, Whistling Straits
- Location: Haven, Wisconsin
(United States)	14	10	(Europe)
- United States wins the Palmer Cup

The 2005 Palmer Cup was held on June 8–9, 2005 on the Irish Course, Whistling Straits, Haven, Wisconsin. The United States won 14 to 10.

== Format ==
On Wednesday, there were four matches of four-ball in the morning, followed by eight singles matches in the afternoon. Four foursomes matches were played on the Thursday morning with a further eight singles in the afternoon. In all, 24 matches were played.

Each of the 24 matches was worth one point in the larger team competition. If a match was all square after the 18th hole, each side earned half a point toward their team total. The team that accumulated at least 12½ points won the competition.

== Teams ==
Eight college golfers from the United States and Europe participated in the event.

United States
Name	College
Buddy Alex head coach	Florida
Tom Drennan assistant coach	Rhode Island
Ryan Blaum	Duke
Roberto Castro	Georgia Tech
Matt Every	Florida
J. B. Holmes	Kentucky
Spencer Levin	New Mexico
Jeff Overton	Indiana
Michael Putnam	Pepperdine
Matthew Rosenfeld	Texas

Europe
Name	Country	College
Magnus Grankvist head coach	Sweden	
David Llewellyn assistant coach	Wales	
Alejandro Cañizares	Spain	Arizona State
Rhys Davies	Wales	East Tennessee State
Kalle Edberg	Sweden	Augusta State
Scott Jamieson	Scotland	Arizona State
Pablo Martín	Spain	Oklahoma State
Alex Norén	Sweden	Oklahoma State
David Skinns	England	Tennessee
Steven Tiley	England	Georgia State

== Wednesday's matches ==
=== Morning four-ball ===
	Results
Davies/Tiley	(United States) 6 & 4	Holmes/Levin
Jamieson/Skinns	(Europe) 3 & 2	Every/Rosenfeld
Cañizares/Martín	(Europe) 2 & 1	Overton/Putnam
Edberg/Norén	(United States) 1 up	Blaum/Castro
2	Four-ball	2
2	Overall	2

=== Afternoon singles ===
	Results
Rhys Davies	halved	Spencer Levin
David Skinns	(United States) 4 & 2	Matt Every
Steven Tiley	(United States) 3 & 2	J. B. Holmes
Pablo Martín	halved	Jeff Overton
Scott Jamieson	(United States) 5 & 4	Michael Putnam
Alex Norén	(Europe) 5 & 4	Ryan Blaum
Alejandro Cañizares	(Europe) 3 & 1	Matthew Rosenfeld
Kalle Edberg	(Europe) 3 & 1	Roberto Castro
4	Singles	4
6	Overall	6

== Thursday's matches ==
=== Morning foursomes ===
	Results
Edberg/Norén	(Europe) 3 & 2	Every/Rosenfeld
Jamieson/Skinns	(Europe) 3 & 1	Holmes/Putnam
Davies/Tiley	(United States) 3 & 2	Blaum/Levin
Cañizares/Martín	(United States) 5 & 4	Castro/Overton
2	Foursomes	2
8	Overall	8

=== Afternoon singles ===
	Results
Scott Jamieson	(United States) 2 & 1	Matt Every
David Skinns	(United States) 3 & 1	Michael Putnam
Alex Norén	(United States) 3 & 2	J. B. Holmes
Kalle Edberg	(Europe) 1 up	Matthew Rosenfeld
Rhys Davies	(United States) 3 & 2	Ryan Blaum
Steven Tiley	(United States) 4 & 3	Roberto Castro
Pablo Martín	(United States) 4 & 3	Jeff Overton
Alejandro Cañizares	(Europe) 1 up	Spencer Levin
2	Singles	6
10	Overall	14

== Michael Carter award ==
The Michael Carter Award winners were Matt Every and David Skinns.
