= Stuart Wilson (golfer) =

Scottish amateur golfer (born 1977)

Personal information
- Nationality: Scotland
- Born: 18 July 1977 (age 49) Scotland

Career
- Sport: Golf
- Status: Amateur

Best results in major championships
- Masters Tournament: CUT: 2005
- PGA Championship: DNP
- U.S. Open: DNP
- The Open Championship: T63: 2004

Stuart Wilson (born 18 July 1977) is a Scottish amateur golfer.

== Career ==
Wilson won the 2004 Amateur Championship at St Andrews Links. His win gave him an entry to the 2004 Open Championship where he was the only Amateur to make the cut, and so winning the Silver Medal as the leading Amateur.

Wilson was the European Junior Ryder Cup captain in 2012 and 2014 and was the captain of the 2021 Walker Cup team.

Wilson was the managing secretary at Forfar Golf Club for 15 years before taking up a similar position at The Blairgowrie Golf Club in January 2021.

== Amateur wins ==
- 2003 Lytham Trophy
- 2004 The Amateur Championship

== Results in major championships ==
Tournament	2001	2002	2003	2004	2005
Masters Tournament					CUT
The Open Championship	CUT			T63LA	

Note: Wilson never played in the U.S. Open or the PGA Championship.

Did not play

LA = Low amateur
CUT = missed the half-way cut
"T" = tied

== Team appearances ==
- Palmer Cup (representing Great Britain & Ireland): 2001, 2002
- European Amateur Team Championship (representing Scotland): 2003
- Walker Cup (representing Great Britain & Ireland): 2003 (winners), 2021 (non-playing captain)
- Eisenhower Trophy (representing Scotland): 2004
- St Andrews Trophy (representing Great Britain & Ireland): 2004 (winners)
- Bonallack Trophy (representing Europe): 2002, 2004
