= 2007 Palmer Cup =

Team golf competition in the United States

- Dates: June 7–8, 2007
- Venue: Caves Valley Golf Club
- Location: Owings Mills, Maryland
(United States)	18	6	(Europe)
- United States wins the Palmer Cup

The 2007 Palmer Cup was held on June 7–8, 2007 on the Caves Valley Golf Club, Owings Mills, Maryland. The United States won 18 to 6. Europe took a 3–1 lead on the first morning but the United States won all 8 of the afternoon singles matches to lead 9–3.

== Format ==
On Thursday, there were four matches of four-ball in the morning, followed by eight singles matches in the afternoon. Four foursomes matches were played on the Friday morning with a further eight singles in the afternoon. In all, 24 matches were played.

Each of the 24 matches was worth one point in the larger team competition. If a match was all square after the 18th hole, each side earned half a point toward their team total. The team that accumulated at least 12 1/2 points won the competition.

== Teams ==
Eight college golfers from the United States and Europe participated in the event.

United States
Name	College
Mike McGraw head coach	Oklahoma State
John Knauer assistant coach	Arizona
Brian Harman	Georgia
Billy Horschel	Florida
Dustin Johnson	Coastal Carolina
Chris Kirk	Georgia
Luke List	Vanderbilt
Jamie Lovemark	Southern California
Jonathan Moore	Oklahoma State
Webb Simpson	Wake Forest

Europe
Name	Country	College
Chris van der Velde head coach	Netherlands	
Peter Svallin assistant coach	Sweden	
Jonas Blixt	Sweden	Florida State
Jorge Campillo	Spain	Indiana
Rhys Davies	Wales	East Tennessee State
Oscar Florén	Sweden	Texas Tech
Mark Haastrup	Denmark	Georgia State
Pedro Oriol	Spain	Arizona
Gareth Shaw	Northern Ireland	East Tennessee State
Gordon Yates	Scotland	Stirling

== Thursday's matches ==
=== Morning four-ball ===
	Results
Davies/Shaw	(Europe) 9 & 7	List/Lovemark
Campillo/Oriol	(United States) 3 & 2	Harman/Horschel
Haastrup/Yates	(Europe) 1 up	Moore/Simpson
Blixt/Florén	(Europe) 2 & 1	Johnson/Kirk
3	Four-ball	1
3	Overall	1

=== Afternoon singles ===
	Results
Rhys Davies	(United States) 4 & 2	Jamie Lovemark
Jorge Campillo	(United States) 2 up	Luke List
Gareth Shaw	(United States) 2 up	Billy Horschel
Pedro Oriol	(United States) 4 & 2	Brian Harman
Gordon Yates	(United States) 2 & 1	Jonathan Moore
Jonas Blixt	(United States) 2 & 1	Webb Simpson
Mark Haastrup	(United States) 1 up	Chris Kirk
Oscar Florén	(United States) 4 & 2	Dustin Johnson
0	Singles	8
3	Overall	9

== Friday's matches ==
=== Morning foursomes ===
	Results
Campillo/Oriol	(United States) 5 & 4	Harman/Horschel
Blixt/Florén	(Europe) 5 & 4	List/Lovemark
Haastrup/Yates	(United States) 4 & 3	Moore/Simpson
Davies/Shaw	(United States) 2 & 1	Johnson/Kirk
1	Foursomes	3
4	Overall	12

=== Afternoon singles ===
	Results
Oscar Florén	(United States) 4 & 3	Billy Horschel
Gordon Yates	(United States) 6 & 5	Luke List
Gareth Shaw	(United States) 1 up	Brian Harman
Jonas Blixt	(Europe) 1 up	Webb Simpson
Mark Haastrup	(United States) 2 & 1	Jamie Lovemark
Pedro Oriol	(United States) 2 & 1	Jonathan Moore
Jorge Campillo	(United States) 2 & 1	Dustin Johnson
Rhys Davies	(Europe) 4 & 2	Chris Kirk
2	Singles	6
6	Overall	18

== Michael Carter award ==
The Michael Carter Award winners were Jonathan Moore and Rhys Davies.
