= Sebastian Cappelen =

Danish professional golfer (born 1990)

Personal information
- Nationality: Denmark
- Born: 14 April 1990 (age 36) Odense, Denmark
- Height: 6 ft 0 in (1.83 m)
- Weight: 190 lb (86 kg; 14 st)
- Spouse: Audrey

Career
- Sport: Golf
- College: University of Arkansas
- Turned professional: 2014
- Current tour: PGA Tour
- Former tour: Korn Ferry Tour
- Professional wins: 2

Number of wins by tour
- Korn Ferry Tour: 2

Best results in major championships
- Masters Tournament: DNP
- PGA Championship: DNP
- U.S. Open: CUT: 2015
- The Open Championship: DNP

Sebastian Cappelen (born 14 April 1990) is a Danish professional golfer.

== Amateur career ==
Cappelen played college golf at the University of Arkansas where he was a four-time All-American and won four times including the 2013 SEC Championship. He also played for the European team in the Palmer Cup three times.

== Professional career ==
After graduating, Cappelen turned professional in June 2014. He Monday qualified for the Air Capital Classic on the Web.com Tour, surviving a seven-man playoff for his spot in the tournament. In the tournament itself, Cappelen shot an 18-under-par 262 to beat Matt Weibring by one stroke. The win, the first by a Dane on the Web.com Tour, earned Cappelen his card for the rest of the 2014 season. He was the 14th player to win his Web.com Tour debut and the first since Ben Kohles in 2012. Despite the win, Cappelen barely missed earning a PGA Tour card, finishing 30th on the regular season money list and outside the Top 50 in the finals money list.

Cappelen made his PGA Tour debut at the 2014 Sanderson Farms Championship, playing on a sponsor's exemption, where he led after the first round. He faded in the last three rounds to finish T35.

== Professional wins (2) ==
=== Korn Ferry Tour wins (2) ===
No.	Date	Tournament	Winning score	Margin of victory	Runner(s)-up
1	22 Jun 2014	Air Capital Classic	−18 (66-65-65-66=262)	1 stroke	(United States) Matt Weibring
2	2 Jun 2019	Rex Hospital Open	−21 (65-65-69-64=263)	3 strokes	(United States) Grayson Murray, (United States) Zack Sucher

Korn Ferry Tour playoff record (0–1)

No.	Year	Tournament	Opponents	Result
1	2019	Wichita Open	(United States) Bryan Bigley, (United States) Erik Compton, (United States) Kevin Dougherty, (Sweden) Henrik Norlander	Norlander won with par on third extra hole Cappelen, Compton and Dougherty eliminated by birdie on first hole

== Results in major championships ==
Tournament	2015
Masters Tournament	
U.S. Open	CUT
The Open Championship	
PGA Championship	

Did not play

CUT = missed the half-way cut
"T" indicates a tie for a place

== Team appearances ==
Amateur

- European Amateur Team Championship (representing Denmark): 2009, 2011
- Palmer Cup (representing Europe): 2011, 2012 (winners), 2013

== See also ==
- 2019 Korn Ferry Tour Finals graduates
