= 2000 Palmer Cup =

Team golf competition in England

- Dates: 15–16 August 2000
- Venue: Royal Liverpool Golf Club
- Location: Hoylake, England
(United Kingdom) (Republic of Ireland)	12½	11½	(United States)
- Great Britain and Ireland wins the Palmer Cup

The 2000 Palmer Cup was held on 15–16 August 2000 at Royal Liverpool Golf Club in Hoylake, England. Great Britain and Ireland won 12½–11½. At the final hole of the final match, Phil Rowe holed a 20-foot putt for a birdie, to halve his match and win the Palmer Cup.

== Format ==
On Tuesday, there were four matches of four-ball in the morning, followed by four foursomes matches in the afternoon. Eight singles matches were played on the Wednesday morning with a further eight more in the afternoon.. In all, 24 matches were played.

Each of the 24 matches was worth one point in the larger team competition. If a match was all square after the 18th hole, each side earned half a point toward their team total. The team that accumulated at least 12½ points won the competition.

== Teams ==
Eight college golfers from the Great Britain and Ireland and the United States participated in the event.

Great Britain & Ireland
Name	Country	College
Clive Brown team manager	Wales	
Mark Booker	England	Surrey
Jamie Elson	England	Augusta State
Max Harris	England	North Carolina
Joel Hendry	Scotland	New Mexico
Graeme McDowell	Northern Ireland	Alabama at Birmingham
Simon Robinson	England	Houston
Phil Rowe	England	Stanford
Kyron Sullivan	Wales	Wales

United States
Name	College
Ross Randall head coach	Kansas
Mark Simpson team manager	Colorado
Jonathan Byrd	Clemson
Nick Cassini	Georgia
John Engler	Clemson
Lucas Glover	Clemson
Jeff Klauk	Florida Southern
Andy Miller	Brigham Young
Andy Sanders	Houston
Chris Wisler	East Tennessee State

== Tuesday's matches ==
=== Morning four-ball ===
&	Results
Elson/Harris	(United Kingdom) (Republic of Ireland) 3 & 2	Cassini/Sanders
Booker/Hendry	(United States) 5 & 3	Glover/Miller
McDowell/Sullivan	(United Kingdom) (Republic of Ireland) 2 up	Klauk/Wisler
Robinson/Rowe	halved	Byrd/Engler
2½	Four-ball	1½
2½	Overall	1½

=== Afternoon foursomes ===
&	Results
Elson/Harris	(United States) 5 & 3	Miller/Sanders
Booker/Hendry	(United States) 5 & 4	Byrd/Cassini
McDowell/Robinson	(United Kingdom) (Republic of Ireland) 1 up	Engler/Wisler
Rowe/Sullivan	(United Kingdom) (Republic of Ireland) 3 & 1	Glover/Klauk
2	Foursomes	2
4½	Overall	3½

== Wednesday's matches ==
=== Morning singles ===
&	Results
Graeme McDowell	(United Kingdom) (Republic of Ireland) 6 & 4	Lucas Glover
Joel Hendry	(United Kingdom) (Republic of Ireland) 3 & 2	Andy Miller
Max Harris	halved	Nick Cassini
Jamie Elson	(United States) 1 up	Jonathan Byrd
Simon Robinson	(United States) 3 & 2	John Engler
Mark Booker	(United Kingdom) (Republic of Ireland) 3 & 2	Andy Sanders
Kyron Sullivan	(United States) 1 up	Chris Wisler
Phil Rowe	(United Kingdom) (Republic of Ireland) 1 up	Jeff Klauk
4½	Singles	3½
9	Overall	7

=== Afternoon singles ===
&	Results
Graeme McDowell	(United Kingdom) (Republic of Ireland) 1 up	Lucas Glover
Max Harris	(United States) 3 & 2	Andy Miller
Joel Hendry	(United States) 1 up	Nick Cassini
Kyron Sullivan	(United States) 5 & 4	Chris Wisler
Jamie Elson	(United Kingdom) (Republic of Ireland) 1 up	John Engler
Mark Booker	(United Kingdom) (Republic of Ireland) 4 & 3	Jeff Klauk
Simon Robinson	(United States) 3 & 2	Andy Sanders
Phil Rowe	halved	Jonathan Byrd
3½	Singles	4½
12½	Overall	11½
