= 2017 Arnold Palmer Cup =

Team golf competition in the United States

- Dates: June 9–11, 2017
- Venue: Atlanta Athletic Club; Highlands course
- Location: Johns Creek, Georgia
(United States)	19½	10½	(Europe)
- USA wins the Arnold Palmer Cup

The 2017 Arnold Palmer Cup was a team golf competition held from June 9–11, 2017 at Atlanta Athletic Club in Johns Creek, Georgia, United States. The 21st playing of the Arnold Palmer Cup, it was the first since the death of namesake Arnold Palmer.

The score was level at 5 points each after the first day but the United States team won 9 of the 10 singles matches on the second day and halved the other. This gave them an overwhelming lead, needing just 1 point from 10 singles matches on the final day to win the match. The second set of singles was split 5–5, to give the United States a comfortable 19½–10½ victory in the match.

== Format ==
On Friday, there were five matches of foursomes in the morning, followed by five four-ball matches in the afternoon. Ten singles matches were played on Saturday, and ten more on Sunday. In all, 30 matches were played.

Each of the 30 matches was worth one point in the larger team competition. If a match was all square after the 18th hole, each side earned half a point toward their team total. The team that accumulated at least 15½ points won the competition.

== Teams ==
Ten college golfers from the United States and Europe participated in the event plus a non-playing head coach and assistant coach for each team.

United States
Name	Class	College	Qualification method
John Fields	non-playing head coach		
Andrew DiBitetto	non-playing assistant coach		
Sam Burns	So.	LSU	1st in Arnold Palmer Cup Ranking
Chandler Phillips	So.	Texas A&M	2nd in Arnold Palmer Cup Ranking
Collin Morikawa	So.	California	3rd in Arnold Palmer Cup Ranking
Jimmy Stanger	Sr.	Virginia	4th in Arnold Palmer Cup Ranking
Maverick McNealy	Sr.	Stanford	5th in Arnold Palmer Cup Ranking
Norman Xiong	Fr.	Oregon	6th in Arnold Palmer Cup Ranking
John Coultas	Jr.	Florida Southern	Committee pick, non-Division I
Sean Crocker	Jr.	Southern California	Committee pick
Nick Hardy	Jr.	Illinois	Committee pick
Doug Ghim	Jr.	Texas	Coach's pick

Europe
Name	Country	Class	College	Qualification method
David Inglis	Scotland	non-playing head coach		
Alan Murray	Ireland	non-playing assistant coach		
Hannes Rönneblad	Sweden	Sr.	Texas Tech	1st in Arnold Palmer Cup Ranking
Fredrik Niléhn	Sweden	Jr.	Texas Tech	2nd in Arnold Palmer Cup Ranking
Kristoffer Ventura	Norway	Jr.	Oklahoma State	3rd in Arnold Palmer Cup Ranking
David Wicks	England	Jr.	Jacksonville	4th in Arnold Palmer Cup Ranking
Harry Ellis	England	Jr.	Florida State	5th in Arnold Palmer Cup Ranking
Rory Franssen	Scotland	Fr.	Missouri	6th in Arnold Palmer Cup Ranking
Stuart Grehan	Ireland		Maynooth	Committee pick
Viktor Hovland	Norway	Fr.	Oklahoma State	Committee pick
Richard Mansell	England	Sr.	Nova Southeastern	Coach's pick
Harry Hall	England	So.	UNLV	Pick

The final place was allocated to the winner of the R&A Foundation Scholars Tournament. This was won by Stuart Grehan, who had already been selected for the team. Harry Hall was later selected as the final member of the team.

== Friday's matches ==
=== Morning foursomes ===
	Results
Franssen/Grehan	halved	Burns/Phillips
Hovland/Ventura	(United States) 6 & 5	Coultas/Stanger
Ellis/Hall	(Europe) 1 up	Hardy/Xiong
Niléhn/Rönneblad	(United States) 4 & 2	Crocker/Ghim
Mansell/Wicks	(United States) 2 & 1	McNealy/Morikawa
1½	Foursomes	3½
1½	Overall	3½

=== Afternoon four-ball ===
	Results
Wicks/Mansell	(Europe) 3 & 1	Burns/Phillips
Ventura/Hovland	(Europe) 1 up	Coultas/Stanger
Grehan/Franssen	halved	Hardy/Xiong
Niléhn/Rönneblad	(Europe) 4 & 2	Crocker/Morikawa
Ellis/Hall	(United States) 3 & 2	Ghim/McNealy
3½	Four-ball	1½
5	Overall	5

== Saturday's singles matches ==
	Results
Richard Mansell	(United States) 4 & 3	Norman Xiong
Harry Hall	(United States) 7 & 5	Doug Ghim
Harry Ellis	(United States) 3 & 2	Jimmy Stanger
David Wicks	(United States) 5 & 4	Nick Hardy
Stuart Grehan	(United States) 2 & 1	Sam Burns
Rory Franssen	(United States) 3 & 2	Collin Morikawa
Viktor Hovland	halved	Maverick McNealy
Kristoffer Ventura	(United States) 4 & 3	John Coultas
Fredrik Niléhn	(United States) 4 & 3	Sean Crocker
Hannes Rönneblad	(United States) 1 up	Chandler Phillips
½	Singles	9½
5½	Overall	14½

== Sunday's singles matches ==
	Results
Harry Hall	(United States) 8 & 7	Norman Xiong
Stuart Grehan	(United States) 2 & 1	Doug Ghim
Viktor Hovland	(Europe) 3 & 2	Jimmy Stanger
Harry Ellis	(United States) 3 & 2	Nick Hardy
Kristoffer Ventura	(Europe) 2 & 1	Sam Burns
Fredrik Niléhn	(Europe) 2 & 1	Collin Morikawa
Rory Franssen	(United States) 8 & 7	Maverick McNealy
Richard Mansell	(Europe) 2 up	John Coultas
David Wicks	(United States) 3 & 2	Sean Crocker
Hannes Rönneblad	(Europe) 2 & 1	Chandler Phillips
5	Singles	5
10½	Overall	19½

== Michael Carter award ==
The Michael Carter Award winners were David Wicks and Maverick McNealy.
