= Alejandro Cañizares =

Spanish professional golfer

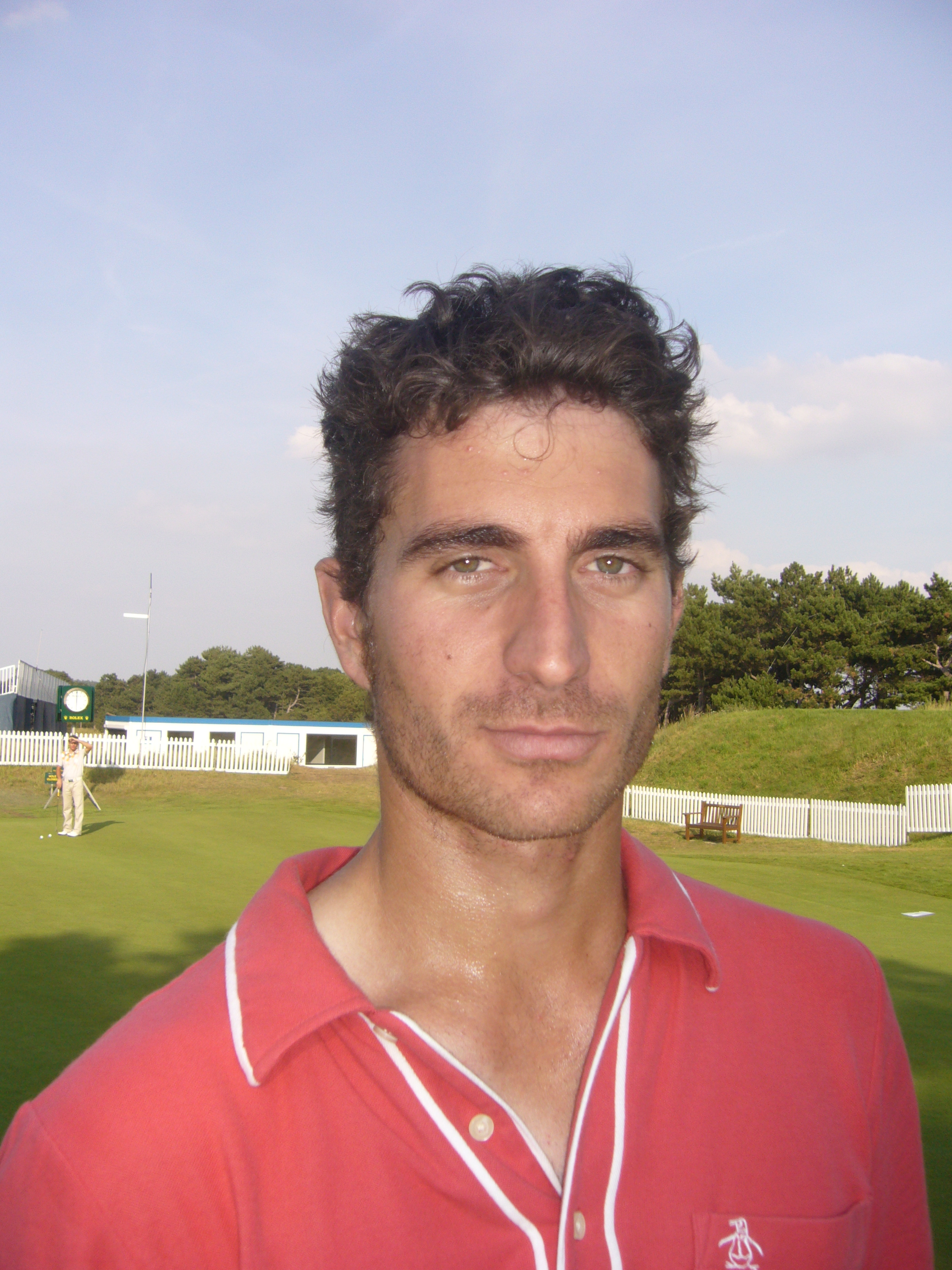
- Cañizares at the 2009 KLM Open

Personal information
- Full name: José Alejandro Cañizares Gómez
- Nationality: Spain
- Born: 9 January 1983 (age 43) Madrid, Spain
- Height: 1.80 m (5 ft 11 in)
- Weight: 72 kg (159 lb; 11.3 st)

Career
- Sport: Golf
- College: Arizona State University
- Turned professional: 2006
- Current tour: European Tour
- Former tour: PGA Tour
- Professional wins: 2
- Highest ranking: 89 (16 March 2014)

Number of wins by tour
- European Tour: 2

Best results in major championships
- Masters Tournament: DNP
- PGA Championship: DNP
- U.S. Open: DNP
- The Open Championship: T27: 2010

José Alejandro Cañizares Gómez (born 9 January 1983) is a Spanish professional golfer who plays on the European Tour.

== Career ==
Cañizares was born in Madrid, and is the son of five-time European Tour winner and four-time European Ryder Cup team member, José María Cañizares. He attended college in the United States, where he won the 2003 individual NCAA men's golf championship while at Arizona State University. He turned professional in 2006.

In August 2006, Cañizares won on his third start as an affiliate member of the European Tour, at the Imperial Collection Russian Open. The win gave him full membership of the tour for two years. It also put him into the record books as the fastest affiliate member to win on the tour, surpassing Sergio García and Graeme McDowell who had both won in their fourth tournaments.

Cañizares earned his PGA Tour card for 2008 through the 2007 PGA Tour Qualifying Tournament. He divided his time between both the PGA and European tours during the season, but was only able to retain his playing status in Europe.

In March 2014, Cañizares won his second European Tour title at the Trophée Hassan II tournament in Morocco. He shot a 62 in the first round and led wire-to-wire, culminating in a five-stroke victory to end an eight-year drought on the tour.

== Amateur wins ==
- 2001 Copa Nacional Puerta de Hierro
- 2002 Spanish Amateur Under 21 Championship
- 2003 National Invitational, NCAA Championship
- 2004 ASU Thunderbird Invitational
- 2005 Big-10/Pac-10 Challenge, PING-Arizona Intercollegiate, Puerto Rico Classic

== Professional wins (2) ==
=== European Tour wins (2) ===
No.	Date	Tournament	Winning score	Margin of victory	Runner-up
1	20 Aug 2006	Imperial Collection Russian Open	−22 (66-67-67-66=266)	4 strokes	(Scotland) David Drysdale
2	16 Mar 2014	Trophée Hassan II	−19 (62-68-69-70=269)	5 strokes	(England) Andy Sullivan

European Tour playoff record (0–2)

No.	Year	Tournament	Opponent(s)	Result
1	2010	Iberdrola Open Cala Millor Mallorca	(Sweden) Peter Hanson	Lost to par on first extra hole
2	2010	Alstom Open de France	(Spain) Miguel Ángel Jiménez, (Italy) Francesco Molinari	Jiménez won with par on first extra hole

== Results in major championships ==
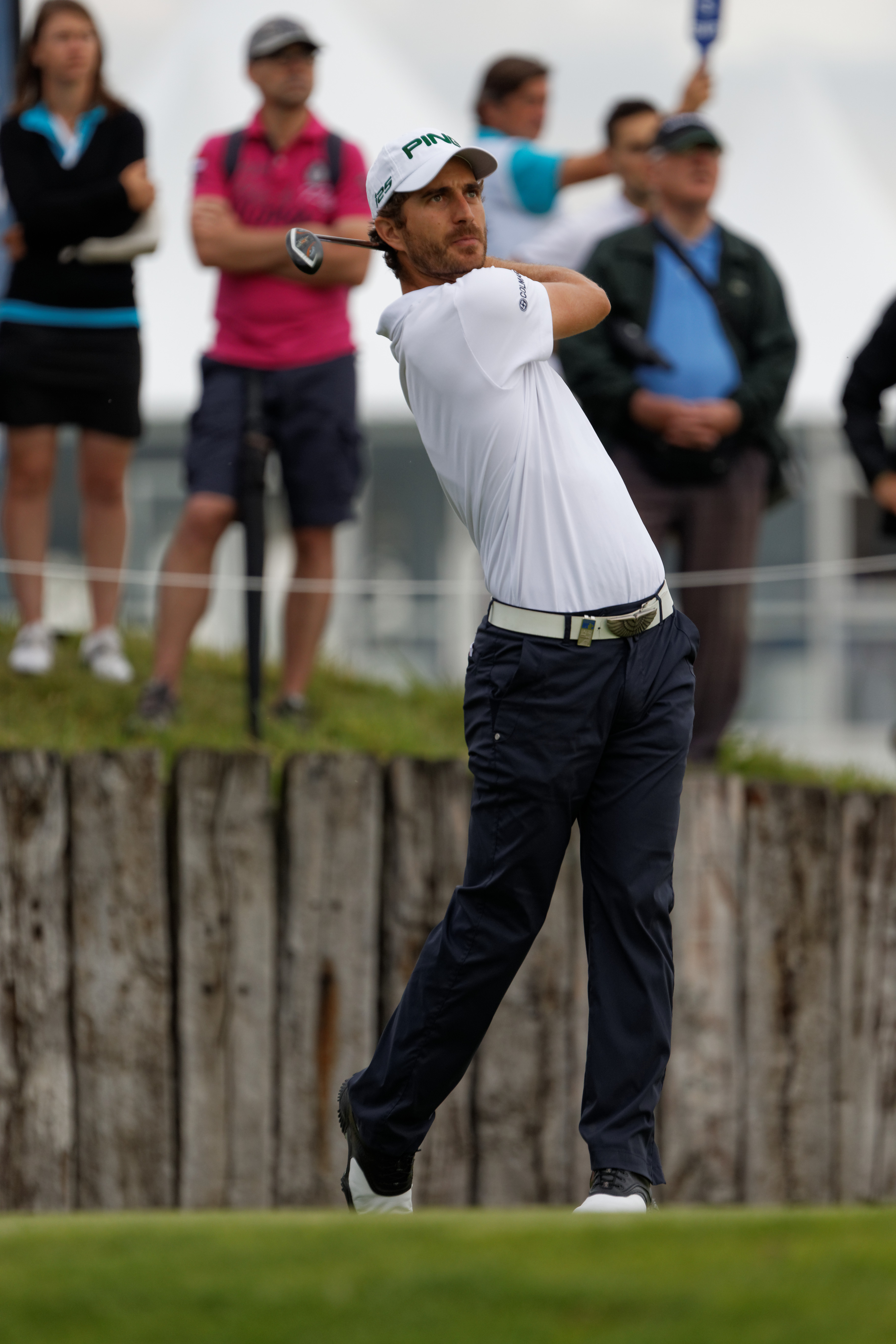
Alejandro Cañizares

Tournament	2010	2011	2012	2013	2014	2015	2016	2017	2018
Masters Tournament									
U.S. Open									
The Open Championship	T27	CUT	CUT						
PGA Championship									

Tournament	2019	2020	2021	2022	2023
Masters Tournament					
PGA Championship					
U.S. Open					
The Open Championship		NT			CUT

Did not play

CUT = missed the half-way cut
"T" = tied
NT = No tournament due to COVID-19 pandemic

== Team appearances ==
Amateur

- European Boys' Team Championship (representing Spain): 2001
- Jacques Léglise Trophy (representing Continental Europe): 2001 (winners)
- European Youths' Team Championship (representing Spain): 2002, 2004
- European Amateur Team Championship (representing Spain): 2003 (winners), 2005
- Palmer Cup (representing Europe): 2003 (winners), 2004 (winners), 2005, 2006 (winners)

== See also ==
- 2007 PGA Tour Qualifying School graduates
- 2009 European Tour Qualifying School graduates
- 2018 European Tour Qualifying School graduates
- 2019 European Tour Qualifying School graduates
