= David Chung (golfer) =

American professional golfer (born 1990)

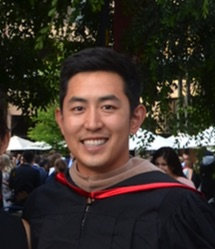

Personal information
- Nationality: United States
- Born: January 14, 1990 (age 36) Fayetteville, North Carolina, U.S.
- Height: 5 ft 9 in (1.75 m)
- Weight: 170 lb (77 kg; 12 st)

Career
- Sport: Golf
- College: Stanford University
- Turned professional: 2012

Best results in major championships
- Masters Tournament: CUT: 2011
- PGA Championship: DNP
- U.S. Open: CUT: 2011
- The Open Championship: DNP

David Chung (born January 14, 1990) is an American professional golfer. He was the number one ranked golfer in the World Amateur Golf Ranking in late 2010 and early 2011.

== Early life ==
Chung was born in Fayetteville, North Carolina to parents of Korean heritage, Christian and Elise Chung.

In 2004, at age 14, Chung was the runner-up in the U.S. Junior Amateur. He also advanced to the semifinals of the U.S. Junior Amateur in 2005. He was the 2005 runner-up in the Western Junior. In 2005, Chung was the Junior Boys Carolinas Player of the year and in 2010, he was the Men's Carolinas Player of the Year. In addition, he was the 2007 First-Team AJGA Rolex Junior All-American.

== Amateur career ==
Chung attended Stanford University. In 2009, as a freshman, he was named to the All-Pac-10 Conference second team. In May 2010, as a Stanford sophomore, Chung was named to the All-Pac-10 Conference first team.

As a junior at Stanford, Chung won the 2009 North and South Amateur, 2010 Porter Cup, and the 2010 Western Amateur. He finished runner-up at the 2010 U.S. Amateur to Peter Uihlein. This earned him invitations to the 2011 Masters Tournament and the 2011 U.S. Open, where he missed the cut.

Chung was a member of the victorious U.S. Team at the 2010 Palmer Cup, where he compiled a 4-0-0 match record. He also played on the 2010 U.S. Eisenhower Trophy team in the World Amateur Team Championship. The team finished third and Chung finished tied for ninth.

== Professional career ==
Chung turned professional in September 2012. In 2013 he won an eGolf Tour Florida tournament and got a 4th place at an Adams Golf Pro Tour event. In 2014, he joined PGA Tour Latinoamérica, where he finished T-8 at the TransAmerican Power Products CRV Open in Mexico, one shot short of a playoff.

== Amateur wins ==
- 2009 North and South Amateur
- 2010 Porter Cup, Western Amateur

== Results in major championships ==
Tournament	2011
Masters Tournament	CUT
U.S. Open	CUT

CUT = missed the half-way cut
Note: Chung only played in the Masters Tournament and the U.S. Open.

== U.S. national team appearances ==
Amateur

- Palmer Cup: 2010 (winners)
- Eisenhower Trophy: 2010
