= 2013 Palmer Cup =

Team golf competition in the United States

- Dates: June 7–9, 2013
- Venue: South Course, Wilmington Country Club
- Location: Wilmington, Delaware
(United States)	20½	9½	(Europe)
- United States wins the Palmer Cup

The 2013 Palmer Cup was held on June 7–9, 2013 on the South Course at Wilmington Country Club, Wilmington, Delaware. The United States won 20½ to 9½. The teams were increased from 8 to 10.

== Format ==
The order of the sessions was changed. On Friday, there were five matches of four-ball, while there were ten singles matches on Saturday. Five foursomes matches were played on Sunday morning followed by ten singles matches in the afternoon. In all, 30 matches were played.

Each of the 30 matches was worth one point in the larger team competition. If a match was all square after the 18th hole, each side earned half a point toward their team total. The team that accumulated at least 15½ points won the competition.

== Teams ==
Ten college golfers from the United States and Europe participated in the event.

United States
Name	College
Jay Seawell head coach	Alabama
Jim Anderson assistant coach	Arizona
Daniel Berger	Florida State
Alex Carpenter	Abilene Christian
Sean Dale	North Florida
James Erkenbeck	New Mexico
Michael Kim	California
Patrick Rodgers	Stanford
Justin Thomas	Alabama
Michael Weaver	California
Cory Whitsett	Alabama
Bobby Wyatt	Alabama

Europe
Name	Country	College
Andrew Coltart head coach	Scotland	
Phil Rowe assistant coach	England	Stanford
Julien Brun	France	TCU
Sebastian Cappelen	Denmark	Arkansas
Greg Eason	England	Central Florida
Scott Fernández	Spain	Iowa State
Pedro Figueiredo	Portugal	UCLA
Gary Hurley	Ireland	NUI Maynooth
Kevin Phelan	Ireland	North Florida
Joël Stalter	France	California
Ben Taylor	England	Nova Southeastern
Pontus Widegren	Sweden	UCLA

== Friday's four-ball matches ==
	Results
Cappelen/Widegren	(United States) 5 & 4	Dale/Wyatt
Eason/Taylor	(United States) 5 & 3	Rodgers/Thomas
Brun/Stalter	(United States) 3 & 2	Carpenter/Whitsett
Fernández/Figueiredo	(United States) 4 & 3	Berger/Erkenbeck
Hurley/Phelan	halved	Kim/Weaver
½	Four-ball	4½
½	Overall	4½

== Saturday's singles matches ==
	Results
Sebastian Cappelen	(United States) 3 & 2	Bobby Wyatt
Greg Eason	(United States) 5 & 3	Justin Thomas
Julien Brun	(United States) 4 & 3	Patrick Rodgers
Pontus Widegren	(United States) 2 up	Sean Dale
Ben Taylor	(United States) 2 & 1	Daniel Berger
Scott Fernández	halved	Cory Whitsett
Gary Hurley	halved	Alex Carpenter
Joël Stalter	halved	James Erkenbeck
Kevin Phelan	(Europe) 3 & 1	Michael Weaver
Pedro Figueiredo	halved	Michael Kim
3	Singles	7
3½	Overall	11½

== Sunday's matches ==
=== Morning foursomes ===
	Results
Hurley/Phelan	(United States) 5 & 3	Whitsett/Wyatt
Brun/Stalter	(United States) 1 up	Carpenter/Kim
Cappelen/Eason	(Europe) 1 up	Berger/Dale
Fernández/Taylor	(Europe) 4 & 3	Erkenbeck/Weaver
Figueiredo/Widegren	halved	Rodgers/Thomas
2½	Foursomes	2½
6	Overall	14

=== Afternoon singles ===
	Results
Kevin Phelan	halved	Bobby Wyatt
Scott Fernández	(United States) 3 & 2	Cory Whitsett
Julien Brun	halved	Sean Dale
Ben Taylor	(Europe) 2 & 1	Daniel Berger
Pedro Figueiredo	(United States) 2 & 1	James Erkenbeck
Pontus Widegren	(Europe) 1 up	Michael Kim
Greg Eason	halved	Alex Carpenter
Joël Stalter	(United States) 3 & 1	Michael Weaver
Sebastian Cappelen	(United States) 2 & 1	Justin Thomas
Gary Hurley	(United States) 2 & 1	Patrick Rodgers
3½	Singles	6½
9½	Overall	20½

== Michael Carter award ==
The Michael Carter Award winners were James Erkenbeck and Pedro Figueiredo.
