= Kyron Sullivan =

Welsh golfer (born 1976)

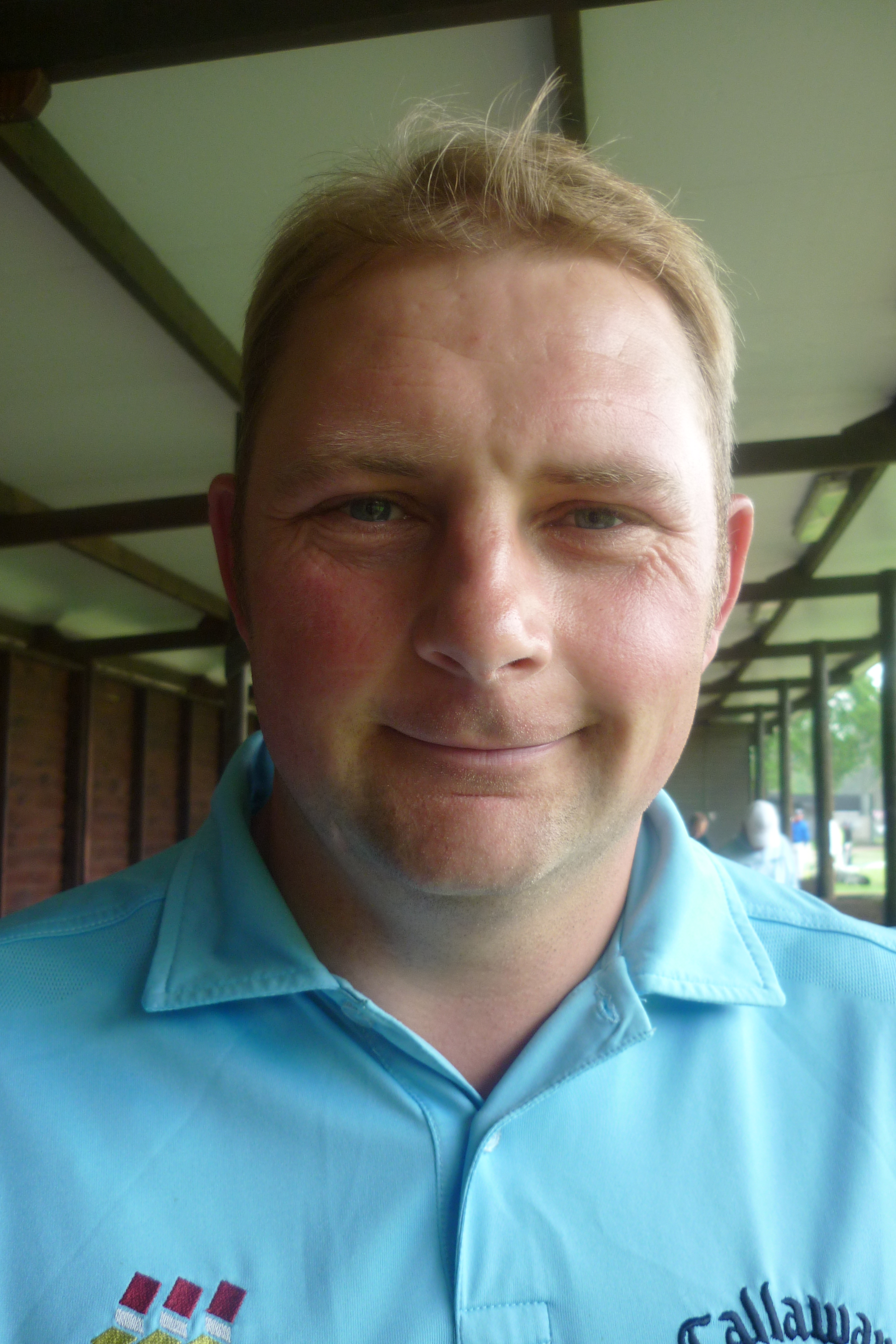
- Sullivan at the 2010 Telenet Trophy

Personal information
- Full name: Kyron Lee Sullivan
- Nationality: Wales
- Born: 22 June 1976 (age 50) Cardiff, Wales
- Height: 5 ft 11 in (1.80 m)
- Weight: 192 lb (87 kg; 13.7 st)
- Spouse: Joanne (m. 2003)
- Children: 2

Career
- Sport: Golf
- College: University of Wales Institute, Cardiff
- Turned professional: 2002 (later reinstated amateur)
- Former tours: European Tour; Challenge Tour
- Professional wins: 3

Number of wins by tour
- Challenge Tour: 1
- Other: 2

Kyron Lee Sullivan (born 22 June 1976) is a Welsh golfer, formerly professional and reinstated as an amateur

== Early life ==
In 1976, Sullivan was born in Cardiff, Wales. Sullivan attended the University of Wales Institute, Cardiff. Afterwards, he worked as an IT analyst.

== Professional career ==
In 2002, he jettisoned his career as an IT analyst and decided to work as a professional golfer. He spent two years playing on the PGA EuroPro Tour and a further three on the Challenge Tour, where he won for the first time in 2006. This helped him to fifth place in the rankings, earning him a place on the European Tour for 2007.

On the European Tour, Sullivan ended his debut year 131st in the Order of Merit, just outside the players who automatically retained their cards, but he still gained entry to several events in 2008. Since 2009, he has returned to the Challenge Tour full-time.

In 2008, Sullivan also won the South Wales Open.

== Reinstated as an amateur ==
Reinstated as an amateur, Sullivan qualified for the 2026 Senior Open Championship, was the only amateur to make the 36-hole-cut and received the award as best amateur.

== Professional wins (3) ==
=== Challenge Tour wins (1) ===
No.	Date	Tournament	Winning score	Margin of victory	Runner-up
1	26 Feb 2006	Estoril Challenge	−4 (70-69-71-74=284)	Playoff	(England) Ben Mason

Challenge Tour playoff record (1–1)

No.	Year	Tournament	Opponent	Result
1	2006	Estoril Challenge	(England) Ben Mason	Won with par on first extra hole
2	2006	Tessali-Metaponto Open di Puglia e Basilicata	(France) Anthony Snobeck	Lost to par on first extra hole

=== PGA EuroPro Tour wins (1) ===
No.	Date	Tournament	Winning score	Margin of victory	Runners-up
1	30 Aug 2002	Highland Spring Golf Challenge	−12 (67-65-66=198)	1 stroke	(England) David Griffiths, (England) Martin LeMesurier

=== Other wins (1) ===
- 2008 South Wales Open

== Team appearances ==
Amateur

- Palmer Cup (representing Great Britain & Ireland): 1998 (tie), 1999, 2000 (winners), 2001
- European Amateur Team Championship (representing Wales): 2001

== See also ==
- 2006 Challenge Tour graduates
