= Northeast Amateur =

Amateur golf tournament in Rhode Island

The Northeast Amateur is an amateur golf tournament played annually at the Wannamoisett Country Club in Rumford, Rhode Island. It was first played in 1962.

In December 2021, the Northeast Amateur joined with six other tournaments to form the Elite Amateur Golf Series.

== Winners ==
- 2026 Tyler Watts
- 2025 Preston Stout
- 2024 Anthony Delisanti
- 2023 Nick Dunlap
- 2022 Dylan Menante
- 2021 Dylan Menante
- 2020 Canceled
- 2019 Garrett May
- 2018 Justin Suh
- 2017 Collin Morikawa
- 2016 Fred Wedel
- 2015 Hunter Stewart
- 2014 Stewart Jolly
- 2013 Cory Whitsett
- 2012 Shin Yong-gu
- 2011 Peter Uihlein
- 2010 Joseph Bramlett
- 2009 Dan Woltman
- 2008 Brendan Gielow
- 2007 Dustin Johnson
- 2006 Carlton Forrester
- 2005 Kyle Reifers
- 2004 Anthony Kim
- 2003 Chris Nallen
- 2002 Brian Quackenbush
- 2001 Luke Donald
- 2000 Luke Donald
- 1999 Jonathan Byrd
- 1998 Michael Harris
- 1997 Brad Elder
- 1996 Jason Enloe
- 1995 Notah Begay III
- 1994 Gary Simpson
- 1993 Allen Doyle
- 1992 David Duval
- 1991 Jay Sigel
- 1990 Todd White
- 1989 Jeff Barlow
- 1988 Brett Quigley
- 1987 Bob Lewis
- 1986 Bob Friend
- 1985 Jay Sigel
- 1984 Jay Sigel
- 1983 Bill Hadden
- 1982 Chris Perry
- 1981 Dick von Tacky
- 1980 Hal Sutton
- 1979 John Cook
- 1978 John Cook
- 1977 Scott Hoch
- 1976 Bob Byman
- 1975 Rocky Waitt
- 1974 Bill Hyndman
- 1973 Ben Crenshaw
- 1972 Wally Kuchar
- 1971 Vinny Giles
- 1970 Allen Miller
- 1969 Jerry Courville
- 1968 Pete Bostwick, Jr.
- 1967 Marty Fleckman
- 1966 Dick Siderowf
- 1965 Ronnie Quinn
- 1964 Ronnie Quinn
- 1963 Gene Francis
- 1962 Dick Siderowf
