= Charles Warren (golfer) =

American golfer (born 1975)

Personal information
- Full name: Charles Otis Warren
- Nationality: United States
- Born: June 21, 1975 (age 51) Columbia, South Carolina, U.S.
- Height: 5 ft 8 in (1.73 m)
- Weight: 160 lb (73 kg; 11 st)

Career
- Sport: Golf
- College: Clemson University
- Turned professional: 1998
- Former tours: PGA Tour; Web.com Tour; Tour de las Américas
- Professional wins: 4

Number of wins by tour
- Korn Ferry Tour: 3
- Other: 1

Best results in major championships
- Masters Tournament: DNP
- PGA Championship: T62: 2006
- U.S. Open: T37: 2000
- The Open Championship: DNP

Charles Otis Warren (born June 21, 1975) is an American professional golfer.

== Early life and amateur career ==
Warren won the NCAA Division I Championship in 1997 while attending Clemson University.

== Professional career ==
Warren was a member of the PGA Tour's developmental tour in 1998 and from 2000–2004 and 2011–2012. He was also a member of the PGA Tour in 1999 and from 2005–2010.

== Amateur wins ==
- 1997 NCAA Division I Championship

== Professional wins (4) ==
=== Nationwide Tour wins (3) ===
No.	Date	Tournament	Winning score	Margin of victory	Runner-up
1	Apr 28, 2002	BMW Charity Pro-Am	−22 (67-65-64-68=264)	4 strokes	(United States) Todd Fischer
2	Jul 25, 2004	Samsung Canadian PGA Championship	−19 (71-65-66-67=269)	7 strokes	(United States) Doug Barron
3	Aug 8, 2004	Cox Classic	−21 (65-71-65-66=267)	1 stroke	(United States) John Elliott

=== Tour de las Américas wins (1) ===
No.	Date	Tournament	Winning score	Margin of victory	Runner-up
1	Jan 18, 2003	Samsung Panama Open	−4 (70-73-70-71=284)	1 stroke	(United States) Ken Duke

== Results in major championships ==
Tournament	2000	2001	2002	2003	2004	2005	2006	2007	2008	2009	2010
U.S. Open	T37										CUT
PGA Championship							T62				

Note: Warren never played in the Masters Tournament nor The Open Championship.

Did not play

CUT = missed the half-way cut
"T" = tied

== U.S. national team appearances ==
Amateur

- Palmer Cup: 1997 (winners)

== See also ==
- 1998 PGA Tour Qualifying School graduates
- 2004 Nationwide Tour graduates
