= Cory Whitsett =

American professional golfer (born 1991)

Personal information
- Nationality: United States
- Born: May 29, 1991 (age 35) Houston, Texas, U.S.
- Height: 6 ft 1 in (185 cm)
- Weight: 180 lb (82 kg)

Career
- Sport: Golf
- College: University of Alabama
- Turned professional: 2014
- Former tour: Web.com Tour

Best results in major championships
- Masters Tournament: DNP
- PGA Championship: DNP
- U.S. Open: CUT: 2014
- The Open Championship: DNP

Achievements and awards
- National High School Senior Athlete of the Year: 2010
- NCAA Elite 89 Award: 2012, 2013
- SEC Player of the Year: 2013

Cory Whitsett (born May 29, 1991) is an American professional golfer, noted for his amateur success. He won the 2007 U.S. Junior Amateur and reached number one in the World Amateur Golf Ranking in October 2013. He appeared in the NCAA championship final with Alabama three years straight 2012–14, winning back-to-back in 2013 and 2014, recording a record seven wins in NCAA match-play.

== Amateur career ==
Whitsett had success as a junior golfer and won the 2007 U.S. Junior Amateur at the age of 15. In 2008, he won the Rolex Tournament of Champions and the 2008 Western Junior, and played for the United States in the Junior Ryder Cup. He was runner-up behind Bud Cauley in 2008 and behind Justin Thomas in 2010 at the Terra Cotta Invitational at Naples National Golf Club.

The National High School Coaches Association selected Whitsett as the 2010 National High School Senior Athlete of the Year for men's golf.

In 2013, Whitsett won the Northeast Amateur. He lost a playoff to Patrick Rodgers at the SH Collegiate Masters and was runner-up at the Sunnehanna Amateur behind Steven Ihm. He played for the United States in the Arnold Palmer Cup and Walker Cup, where he sported a 2–1–1 record.

== College career ==
Whitsett attended the University of Alabama 2010–14 and competed for the Alabama Crimson Tide men's golf team. He won five individual titles at the 2011, 2012 and 2013 Linger Longer Invitational, the 2011 Western Refining College All-America Golf Classic and the 2013 Aggie Invitational. He was named 2013 SEC Player of the Year and received the NCAA Elite 89 Award in 2012 and 2013, as the student-athlete with the best GPA at the NCAA Championships.

Whitsett has the most wins in NCAA match-play history with seven, and was the linchpin of Alabama's three-year dynasty 2012–14. He tied for 4th individually at the 2012 NCAA Championship as Alabama lost the final to Texas 3–2. He then helped lead Alabama to the 2013 NCAA Championship, tying for 16th in stroke play and then going 3–0 in match play. Both years, he played in the match that decided the championship. In 2012 at Riviera, Whitsett whiffed a chip on 18 and saw his opponent Dylan Frittelli sink a 20-footer to win the title for Texas. The next year at Capital City Club, he clinched the title for the Crimson Tide on the 15th hole. He then helped Alabama secure the title again at the 2014 NCAA Championship with a win against Jordan Niebrugge of Oklahoma State.

== Professional career ==
Whitsett turned professional after the competed in the 2014 U.S. Open at Pinehurst. He made six starts on the 2014 Web.com Tour but failed to establish himself. His best PGA Tour finish came at the 2014 Sanderson Farms Championship where he tied for 14th.

== Amateur wins ==
- 2007 U.S. Junior Amateur
- 2008 Rolex Tournament of Champions, Western Junior
- 2011 Linger Longer Invitational, Western Refining College All-America Golf Classic, Patriot All-America Championship
- 2012 Linger Longer Invitational
- 2013 Linger Longer Invitational, Aggie Invitational, Northeast Amateur

== Results in major championships ==
Tournament	2014
U.S. Open	CUT

CUT = missed the halfway cut
Note: Whitsett only played in the U.S. Open.

== U.S. national team appearances ==
Amateur

- Junior Ryder Cup: 2008 (winners)
- Arnold Palmer Cup: 2013 (winners)
- Walker Cup: 2013 (winners)
