= Robby Shelton =

American professional golfer (born 1995)

Personal information
- Full name: Robert Shelton IV
- Nationality: United States
- Born: August 25, 1995 (age 31) Mobile, Alabama, U.S.
- Height: 6 ft 0 in (1.83 m)
- Weight: 190 lb (86 kg; 14 st)

Career
- Sport: Golf
- College: University of Alabama
- Turned professional: 2016
- Current tour: PGA Tour
- Former tours: PGA Tour Canada; Korn Ferry Tour
- Professional wins: 6

Number of wins by tour
- Korn Ferry Tour: 4
- Other: 2

Best results in major championships
- Masters Tournament: DNP
- PGA Championship: DNP
- U.S. Open: CUT: 2014, 2021
- The Open Championship: DNP

Robert Shelton IV (born August 25, 1995) is an American professional golfer from Mobile, Alabama.

Shelton attended and played college for three years at the University of Alabama from 2013 to 2016. He turned professional in 2016 after his junior year.

Shelton played on the 2015 Walker Cup team where he posted a record of 2–1. He also played on the U.S. Palmer Cup team in 2014 and 2015.

As an amateur, he finished tied for third at the 2015 Barbasol Championship on the PGA Tour. This was the highest finish by an amateur in a PGA Tour event since Phil Mickelson in 1991. He also qualified for the 2014 U.S. Open where he missed the cut.

Shelton won the Southern Hills Plantation on the Swing Thought Tour in February 2017, his first professional win. He followed it up with a June win on the PGA Tour Canada en route to finishing second on the tour's money list to earn a promotion to the Web.com Tour.

== Professional wins (6) ==
=== Korn Ferry Tour wins (4) ===
No.	Date	Tournament	Winning score	To par	Margin of victory	Runner-up
1	May 5, 2019	Nashville Golf Open	64-73-65-71=273	−15	Playoff	(United States) Scottie Scheffler
2	May 19, 2019	Knoxville Open	67-65-66-71=269	−15	1 stroke	(United States) Mark Anderson
3	Jun 12, 2022	BMW Charity Pro-Am	66-65-61-71=263	−22	Playoff	(United States) Ben Griffin
4	Aug 14, 2022	Pinnacle Bank Championship	66-70-66-65=267	−17	1 stroke	(England) Ben Taylor

Korn Ferry Tour playoff record (2–1)

No.	Year	Tournament	Opponent	Result
1	2019	Robert Trent Jones Golf Trail Championship	(United States) Lanto Griffin	Lost to birdie on fourth extra hole
2	2019	Nashville Golf Open	(United States) Scottie Scheffler	Won with birdie on first extra hole
3	2022	BMW Charity Pro-Am	(United States) Ben Griffin	Won with par on second extra hole

=== PGA Tour Canada wins (1) ===
No.	Date	Tournament	Winning score	To par	Margin of victory	Runners-up
1	Jun 18, 2017	GolfBC Championship	63-68-65-69=265	−19	1 stroke	(United States) Cody Blick, (United States) Jonathan Ruiz, (United States) Adam Webb

=== Swing Thought Tour wins (1) ===
- 2017 Southern Hills Plantation

== Results in major championships ==
Results not in chronological order in 2020.

Tournament	2014	2015	2016	2017	2018
Masters Tournament					
U.S. Open	CUT				
The Open Championship					
PGA Championship					

Tournament	2019	2020	2021
Masters Tournament			
PGA Championship			
U.S. Open			CUT
The Open Championship		NT	

Did not play

CUT = missed the halfway cut
NT = No tournament due to COVID-19 pandemic

== Results in The Players Championship ==
Tournament	2021	2022	2023	2024
The Players Championship	CUT		CUT	CUT

Did not play

CUT = missed the halfway cut

== Team appearances ==
Amateur

- Junior Ryder Cup (representing the United States): 2012 (winners)
- Palmer Cup (representing the United States): 2014, 2015 (winners)
- Walker Cup (representing the United States): 2015

Professional

- Aruba Cup (representing PGA Tour Canada): 2017 (winners)

== See also ==
- 2019 Korn Ferry Tour Finals graduates
- 2022 Korn Ferry Tour Finals graduates
- List of golfers with most Korn Ferry Tour wins
