= Brad Elder =

American professional golfer (born 1975)

Personal information
- Full name: Bradley Ryan Elder
- Nationality: United States
- Born: March 17, 1975 (age 51) Tulsa, Oklahoma, U.S.
- Height: 6 ft 4 in (1.93 m)
- Weight: 195 lb (88 kg; 13.9 st)
- Spouse: Peggy Elder
- Children: 1

Career
- Sport: Golf
- College: University of Texas
- Turned professional: 1998
- Current tour: Web.com Tour
- Former tour: PGA Tour
- Professional wins: 3

Number of wins by tour
- Korn Ferry Tour: 3

Best results in major championships
- Masters Tournament: DNP
- PGA Championship: DNP
- U.S. Open: T58: 2015
- The Open Championship: DNP

Achievements and awards
- Haskins Award: 1997
- University of Texas Hall of Honor: 2020
- Texas Golf Hall of Fame: 2022
- Jack Nicklaus college player of the year: 1997

Bradley Ryan Elder (born March 17, 1975) is an American professional golfer who has played on the Nationwide Tour and the PGA Tour.

== Early life and amateur career ==
In 1975, Elder was born in Tulsa, Oklahoma. He got his start in golf from his father.

Elder attended the University of Texas and was a member of the golf team. He won the Haskins Award for most outstanding collegiate golfer in 1997, his senior year.

== Professional career ==
In 1998, Elder turned professional and debuted on the Nike Tour. He won two events in that venue in 1999, which allowed him to move up to the PGA Tour.

Elder played on the PGA Tour from 2000 to 2003; his best finishes in that period were T-2 at the SEI Pennsylvania Classic in 2000 and a solo 3rd at the Southern Farm Bureau Classic in 2002.

In 2004, Elder rejoined the developmental tour, now called the Nationwide Tour. In 2007, he finished in the top-25 on the Nationwide Tour's money list, which included a win at the Preferred Health Systems Wichita Open for the second time. This allowed him to regain his PGA Tour card for 2008, but he did not retain the card, and returned to the Nationwide Tour in 2009.

== Awards and honors ==
- In 1997, Elder won the Haskins Award, bestowed to the top college golfer of the year. He also won the Jack Nicklaus College Player of the Year
- In 2020, he entered the University of Texas Hall of Honor
- In 2022, he was inducted into the Texas Golf Hall of Fame

== Amateur wins ==
this list may be incomplete

- 1994 Western Junior
- 1997 Northeast Amateur

== Professional wins (3) ==
=== Nationwide Tour wins (3) ===
No.	Date	Tournament	Winning score	Margin of victory	Runner-up
1	Jul 25, 1999	Nike Wichita Open	−20 (66-65-66-71=268)	2 strokes	(United States) Mark Wurtz
2	Oct 3, 1999	Nike Inland Empire Open	−21 (70-64-67-66=267)	3 strokes	(United States) Dick Mast
3	Aug 5, 2007	Preferred Health Systems Wichita Open	−19 (65-64-71-65=265)	4 strokes	(Argentina) Fabián Gómez

== Results in major championships ==
Tournament	2000	2001	2002	2003	2004	2005	2006	2007	2008	2009	2010	2011	2012	2013	2014	2015
U.S. Open	CUT			CUT												T58

Note: Elder only played in the U.S. Open.

Did not play

CUT = missed the half-way cut
"T" = tied

== U.S. national team appearances ==
Amateur

- Palmer Cup: 1997 (winners)
- Walker Cup: 1997 (winners)

== See also ==
- 1999 Nike Tour graduates
- 2001 PGA Tour Qualifying School graduates
- 2007 Nationwide Tour graduates
