= Chris Nallen =

American golfer (born 1982)

Personal information
- Nationality: United States
- Born: April 9, 1982 (age 44) Queens, New York, U.S.
- Height: 5 ft 11 in (1.80 m)
- Weight: 180 lb (82 kg; 13 st)

Career
- Sport: Golf
- College: University of Arizona
- Turned professional: 2004
- Former tour: Nationwide Tour
- Professional wins: 1

Number of wins by tour
- Korn Ferry Tour: 1

Best results in major championships
- Masters Tournament: DNP
- PGA Championship: DNP
- U.S. Open: T80: 2005
- The Open Championship: DNP

Chris Nallen (born April 9, 1982) is an American professional golfer.

Nallen was born in Queens, New York but he grew up in Hackettstown, New Jersey. In high school, Nallen went to Blair Academy where he excelled as one of top golfers in the state. He played college golf at the University of Arizona where he won six tournaments and was a four-time All-American. He also won the 2003 Northeast Amateur and the 2004 Dogwood Invitational. He played on the U.S. teams in the 2003 and 2004 Palmer Cups and the 2003 Walker Cup. He was a semi-finalist in 2004 U.S. Amateur. He turned professional after the U.S. Amateur.

In his first pro start, Nallen finished T-49 at the 2004 Buick Championship. In October 2004, he Monday-qualified for the Gila River Classic at Wild Horse Pass Resort on the Nationwide Tour by shooting a round of 63. He shot 60 in the first round and led wire-to-wire for his first pro win. He was the 17th Monday qualifier to win, the 10th player to win in his first career start and the 19th player to lead wire-to-wire. He was the first player to accomplish all three feats simultaneously. He has played on the Nationwide Tour since that win.

== Amateur wins ==
- 2003 Northeast Amateur
- 2004 Dogwood Invitational

== Professional wins (1) ==
=== Nationwide Tour wins (1) ===
No.	Date	Tournament	Winning score	Margin of victory	Runner-up
1	Oct 10, 2004	Gila River Classic	−24 (60-66-67-71=264)	8 strokes	(United States) Troy Matteson

== U.S. national team appearances ==
Amateur

- Walker Cup: 2003
- Palmer Cup: 2003, 2004
