= Brandon Hagy =

American professional golfer (born 1991)

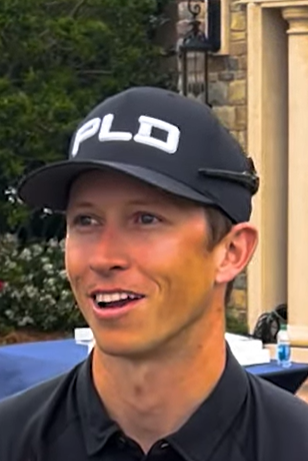

Personal information
- Full name: Brandon Cardell Hagy
- Nationality: United States
- Born: March 21, 1991 (age 35) Santa Monica, California, U.S.
- Height: 5 ft 11 in (1.80 m)
- Weight: 170 lb (77 kg; 12 st)

Career
- Sport: Golf
- College: University of California, Berkeley
- Turned professional: 2014
- Former tours: PGA Tour; Korn Ferry Tour; PGA Tour Americas

Best results in major championships
- Masters Tournament: DNP
- PGA Championship: CUT: 2021
- U.S. Open: CUT: 2015
- The Open Championship: DNP

Brandon Cardell Hagy (born March 21, 1991) is an American professional golfer.

In college, he competed for the California Golden Bears. While there, he won the 2014 Byron Nelson Award.

After turning pro in 2014, Hagy competed in Web.com Tour Q School but failed to advance to the final stage, and therefore had no status on any major tour in 2015. Through sponsor exemptions and Monday qualifying, he made six starts in 2015 on the Web.com Tour and eight on the PGA Tour, including the 2015 U.S. Open, for which he earned a spot through local and sectional qualifying.

Hagy finished tied for 79th at the final stage of Web.com Tour Q School in 2015, earning conditional status for the 2016 Web.com Tour. Thanks to five top-ten finishes in 16 events, he finished 19th on the regular-season money list, earning a PGA Tour card for the 2017 season.

Hagy was not considered a PGA Tour rookie for 2017 since he played in eight PGA Tour events in 2015 (more than seven allowed to retain rookie status). He recorded a top-5 finish at that season's RBC Canadian Open, which helped him to make the 2017 FedEx Cup Playoffs and finish the season 113th to retain his tour card for 2018.

Hagy missed most of the 2018 season due to a wrist injury. He played just three events, with a best result of T18 at Sanderson Farms Championship, and finished the season 215th in points. He was healthy again in 2019 and made a number of starts on PGA Tour thanks to being granted a major medical extension.

== Playoff record ==
Web.com Tour playoff record (0–1)

No.	Year	Tournament	Opponents	Result
1	2018	Wichita Open	(United States) Scott Pinckney, (United States) Brady Schnell	Schnell won with birdie on second extra hole Pinckney eliminated by birdie on first hole

== Results in major championships ==
Results not in chronological order in 2020.

Tournament	2015	2016	2017	2018
Masters Tournament				
U.S. Open	CUT			
The Open Championship				
PGA Championship				

Tournament	2019	2020	2021
Masters Tournament			
PGA Championship			CUT
U.S. Open			
The Open Championship		NT	

Did not play

CUT = missed the half-way cut
NT = No tournament due to COVID-19 pandemic

== Results in The Players Championship ==
Tournament	2022
The Players Championship	CUT

CUT = missed the halfway cut

== U.S. national team appearances ==
Amateur

- Palmer Cup: 2014

== See also ==
- 2016 Web.com Tour Finals graduates
- 2019 Korn Ferry Tour Finals graduates
