= Pinnacle Bank Championship =

Golf tournament

Tournament information
- Location: Omaha, Nebraska
- Established: 2017
- Course: The Club at Indian Creek
- Par: 71
- Length: 7,571 yards (6,923 m)
- Tour: Korn Ferry Tour
- Format: Stroke play
- Prize fund: US$1,000,000
- Month played: August

Tournament record score
- Aggregate: 262 Alistair Docherty (2026); 262 Frankie Harris (2026)
- To par: −22 as above

Current champion
- (United States) Frankie Harris

Location map
- Location in the United States Location in Nebraska

The Pinnacle Bank Championship is a golf tournament on the Korn Ferry Tour. It was first played in July 2017 at The Club at Indian Creek in Omaha, Nebraska.

== Winners ==
Year	Winner	Score	To par	Margin of victory	Runner(s)-up
2026	(United States) Frankie Harris	262	−22	Playoff	(United States) Alistair Docherty
2025	(South Africa) Christo Lamprecht	265	−19	1 stroke	(United States) Peter Kuest
2024	(United States) Matt McCarty	270	−14	1 stroke	(United States) Danny Walker
2023	(Argentina) Alejandro Tosti	265	−19	3 strokes	(United States) Max Greyserman (United States) John VanDerLaan
2022	(United States) Robby Shelton	267	−17	1 stroke	(England) Ben Taylor
2021	(England) David Skinns (2)	270	−14	1 stroke	(China) Dou Zecheng (United States) Jared Wolfe
2020	(United States) Seth Reeves	273	−11	1 stroke	(United States) Tyson Alexander (Canada) Taylor Pendrith (Australia) Ryan Ruffels (New Zealand) Nick Voke (China) Yuan Yechun
2019	(Norway) Kristoffer Ventura	268	−16	2 strokes	(United States) Andres Gonzales (United States) Chad Ramey
2018	(England) David Skinns	268	−16	2 strokes	(South Korea) Im Sung-jae
2017	(United States) Sam Ryder	263	−21	8 strokes	(United States) Scott Gutschewski (United States) Scott Harrington (United States) Michael Johnson (United States) Andrew Landry

== See also ==
- Cox Classic, a previous Korn Ferry Tour event in Omaha, played from 1996 to 2013
