= 2014 Palmer Cup =

Team golf competition in England

- Dates: 26–28 June 2014
- Venue: Walton Heath Golf Club
- Location: Walton-on-the-Hill, Surrey, England
(Europe)	18½	11½	(United States)
- Europe wins the Palmer Cup

The 2014 Palmer Cup was held on 26–28 June 2014 at Walton Heath Golf Club near Walton-on-the-Hill in Surrey, England. Europe won 18½–11½.

== Format ==
On Thursday, there were five matches of foursomes matches in the morning, followed by five four-balls in the afternoon. Ten singles matches were played on Friday, and ten more on Saturday.. In all, 24 matches were played.

Each of the 30 matches was worth one point in the larger team competition. If a match was all square after the 18th hole, each side earned half a point toward their team total. The team that accumulated at least 15½ points won the competition.

== Teams ==
Ten college golfers from Europe and the United States participated in the event.

Europe
Name	Country	College
Andrew Coltart assistant coach	Scotland	
Phil Rowe assistant coach	England	Stanford
Pep Anglès	Spain	Central Arkansas
Thomas Detry	Belgium	Illinois
Paul Dunne	Ireland	UAB
Grant Forrest	Scotland	San Diego
Ricardo Gouveia	Portugal	Central Florida
Jack McDonald	Scotland	Stirling
Erik Oja	Sweden	Arizona
Jon Rahm	Spain	Arizona State
James Ross	Scotland	Houston
Louis Tomlinson	England	Myerscough

United States
Name	College
Ryan Murphy head coach	Texas
Steve Desimone assistant coach	California
Wyndham Clark	Oklahoma State
Bryson DeChambeau	SMU
Brandon Hagy	California
Rico Hoey	Southern California
Stewart Jolly	LSU
Anthony Maccaglia	Oglethorpe
Jack Maguire	Florida State
Trey Mullinax	Alabama
Ollie Schniederjans	Georgia Tech
Robby Shelton	Alabama

== Thursday's matches ==
=== Morning foursomes ===
	Results
Dunne/Forrest	(United States) 2 & 1	Hagy/Schniederjans
Detry/Rahm	(Europe) 2 & 1	Mullinax/Shelton
Gouveia/Oja	(Europe) 3 & 2	Hoey/Maguire
Anglès/Tomlinson	halved	Clark/Maccaglia
McDonald/Ross	(United States) 1 up	Dechambeau/Jolly
2½	Foursomes	2½
2½	Overall	2½

=== Afternoon four-ball ===
	Results
Detry/Rahm	(Europe) 3 & 2	Hagy/Schniederjans
Gouveia/Oja	(United States) 4 & 3	Mullinax/Shelton
Dunne/Forrest	(United States) 4 & 2	Hoey/Maguire
Anglès/Tomlinson	(Europe) 1 up	Dechambeau/Maccaglia
McDonald/Ross	(Europe) 3 & 1	Clark/Jolly
3	Four-ball	2
5½	Overall	4½

== Friday's singles matches ==
	Results
Thomas Detry	(United States) 3 & 1	Trey Mullinax
Jon Rahm	(United States) 1 up	Robby Shelton
Pep Anglès	(United States) 3 & 1	Ollie Schniederjans
Ricardo Gouveia	(Europe) 1 up	Brandon Hagy
Erik Oja	halved	Wyndham Clark
James Ross	(Europe) 4 & 2	Stewart Jolly
Louis Tomlinson	(United States) 5 & 4	Bryson Dechambeau
Paul Dunne	halved	Anthony Maccaglia
Grant Forrest	(Europe) 3 & 2	Jack Maguire
Jack McDonald	halved	Rico Hoey
4½	Singles	5½
10	Overall	10

== Saturday's singles matches ==
	Results
James Ross	(Europe) 3 & 2	Brandon Hagy
Grant Forrest	(Europe) 3 & 2	Trey Mullinax
Paul Dunne	(Europe) 1 up	Robby Shelton
Louis Tomlinson	(United States) 5 & 3	Ollie Schniederjans
Jack McDonald	(Europe) 2 & 1	Bryson Dechambeau
Thomas Detry	(Europe) 4 & 3	Jack Maguire
Jon Rahm	(Europe) 4 & 3	Wyndham Clark
Erik Oja	(Europe) 3 & 2	Anthony Maccaglia
Ricardo Gouveia	(Europe) 3 & 2	Stewart Jolly
Pep Anglès	halved	Rico Hoey
8½	Singles	1½
18½	Overall	11½

== Michael Carter award ==
The Michael Carter Award winners were Ricardo Gouveia and Rico Hoey.
