= 2008 Palmer Cup =

Team golf competition in Scotland

- Dates: 26–27 June 2008
- Venue: Gailes Links
- Location: Irvine, North Ayrshire, Scotland
(Europe)	14	10	(United States)
- Europe wins the Palmer Cup

The 2008 Palmer Cup was held on 26–27 June 2008 on the Gailes Links in Irvine, North Ayrshire, Scotland. Europe won 14–10.

== Format ==
On Thursday, there were four matches of four-ball in the morning, followed by eight singles matches in the afternoon. Four foursomes matches were played on the Friday morning with a further eight singles in the afternoon. In all, 24 matches were played.

Each of the 24 matches was worth one point in the larger team competition. If a match was all square after the 18th hole, each side earned half a point toward their team total. The team that accumulated at least 12½ points won the competition.

== Teams ==
Eight college golfers from Europe and the United States participated in the event.

Europe
Name	Country	College
Mårten Olander head coach	Sweden	
Adam Mednick assistant coach	Sweden	
Jonas Blixt	Sweden	Florida State
Scott Borrowman	Scotland	Stirling
Jonathan Caldwell	Northern Ireland	South Alabama
Jorge Campillo	Spain	Indiana
Jonas Enander Hedin	Sweden	Charlotte
Charlie Ford	England	Tennessee
Gareth Shaw	Northern Ireland	East Tennessee State
Tim Sluiter	Netherlands	Southern California

United States
Name	College
Conrad Ray head coach	Stanford
Andy Bischel assistant coach	UNLV
Kevin Chappell	UNLV
Derek Fathauer	Louisville
Rickie Fowler	Oklahoma State
Aaron Goldberg	San Diego State
Chesson Hadley	Georgia Tech
Billy Horschel	Florida
Adam Mitchell	Georgia
Michael Thompson	Alabama

== Thursday's matches ==
=== Morning four-ball ===
	Results
Blixt/Enander Hedin	(Europe) 1 up	Hadley/Mitchell
Caldwell/Shaw	halved	Chappell/Goldberg
Borrowman/Ford	(United States) 2 & 1	Fathauer/Thompson
Campillo/Sluiter	(Europe) 4 & 2	Fowler/Horschel
2½	Four-ball	1½
2½	Overall	1½

=== Afternoon singles ===
	Results
Jonas Enander Hedin	(United States) 2 up	Aaron Goldberg
Jonas Blixt	(Europe) 5 & 4	Adam Mitchell
Jonathan Caldwell	(United States) 2 & 1	Chesson Hadley
Gareth Shaw	(United States) 1 up	Derek Fathauer
Scott Borrowman	(Europe) 1 up	Billy Horschel
Charlie Ford	(United States) 4 & 3	Rickie Fowler
Jorge Campillo	(United States) 4 & 3	Kevin Chappell
Tim Sluiter	(Europe) 1 up	Michael Thompson
3	Singles	5
5½	Overall	6½

== Friday's matches ==
=== Morning foursomes ===
	Results
Blixt/Enander Hedin	(Europe) 4 & 3	Goldberg/Thompson
Borrowman/Ford	(Europe) 3 & 1	Horschel/Mitchell
Caldwell/Shaw	(Europe) 1 up	Fathauer/Hadley
Campillo/Sluiter	(Europe) 3 & 2	Chappell/Fowler
4	Foursomes	0
9½	Overall	6½

=== Afternoon singles ===
	Results
Jorge Campillo	halved	Rickie Fowler
Jonas Blixt	(Europe) 2 & 1	Michael Thompson
Charlie Ford	halved	Billy Horschel
Gareth Shaw	(United States) 1 up	Chesson Hadley
Scott Borrowman	halved	Kevin Chappell
Jonas Enander Hedin	(Europe) 3 & 2	Adam Mitchell
Jonathan Caldwell	(Europe) 3 & 2	Aaron Goldberg
Tim Sluiter	(United States) 3 & 1	Derek Fathauer
4½	Singles	3½
14	Overall	10

== Michael Carter award ==
The Michael Carter Award winners were Jonas Enander Hedin and Michael Thompson.
