= 2004 Palmer Cup =

Team golf competition in Ireland

- Dates: 6–7 August 2004
- Venue: Ballybunion Golf Club
- Location: County Kerry, Ireland
(Europe)	14½	9½	(United States)
- Europe wins the Palmer Cup

The 2004 Palmer Cup was held on 6–7 August 2004 at Ballybunion Golf Club in County Kerry, Ireland. Europe won 14½–9½.

== Format ==
On Friday, there were four matches of four-ball in the morning, followed by eight singles matches in the afternoon. Four foursomes matches were played on the Saturday morning with a further eight singles in the afternoon. In all, 24 matches were played.

Each of the 24 matches was worth one point in the larger team competition. If a match was all square after the 18th hole, each side earned half a point toward their team total. The team that accumulated at least 12½ points won the competition.

== Teams ==
Eight college golfers from Europe and the United States participated in the event.

Europe
Name	Country	College
Graham Kaye head coach	Switzerland	
Lars Brovold	Norway	Alabama
Alejandro Cañizares	Spain	Arizona State
Gonzalo Fernández-Castaño	Spain	San Pablo, Madrid
Rhys Davies	Wales	East Tennessee State
Gareth Maybin	Northern Ireland	South Alabama
Francesco Molinari	Italy	Turin
Martin Rominger	Switzerland	South Carolina
Alex Norén	Sweden	Oklahoma State

United States
Name	College
Larry Penley head coach	Clemson
Joe Feaganes assistant coach	Marshall
Matt Every	Florida
Jack Ferguson	Clemson
Jason Hartwick	Texas
Billy Hurley III	Navy
J. J. Jakovac	Chico State
Ryan Moore	UNLV
Chris Nallen	Arizona
Chris Stroud	Lamar

== Friday's matches ==
=== Morning four-ball ===
	Results
Cañizares/Fdez-Castaño	(Europe) 2 & 1	Ferguson/Hurley
Molinari/Rominger	(United States) 1 up	Hartwick/Stroud
Davies/Maybin	(Europe) 1 up	Every/Nallen
Brovold/Norén	(Europe) 4 & 2	Jakovac/Moore
3	Four-ball	1
3	Overall	1

=== Afternoon singles ===
	Results
Francesco Molinari	(United States) 4 & 3	Billy Hurley III
Alejandro Cañizares	(Europe) 2 & 1	Matt Every
Martin Rominger	(Europe) 4 & 3	J. J. Jakovac
Rhys Davies	(Europe) 1 up	Jason Hartwick
Gonzalo Fdez-Castaño	(Europe) 8 & 6	Jack Ferguson
Gareth Maybin	(Europe) 2 up	Chris Stroud
Lars Brovold	(Europe) 2 & 1	Chris Nallen
Alex Norén	(United States) 3 & 1	Ryan Moore
6	Singles	2
9	Overall	3

== Saturday's matches ==
=== Morning foursomes ===
	Results
Cañizares/Fdez-Castaño	(United States) 2 up	Jakovac/Moore
Molinari/Rominger	(Europe) 1 up	Every/Nallen
Davies/Maybin	(United States) 2 & 1	Hartwick/Stroud
Brovold/Norén	(United States) 1 up	Ferguson/Hurley
1	Foursomes	3
10	Overall	6

=== Afternoon singles ===
	Results
Alejandro Cañizares	(Europe) 2 up	J. J. Jakovac
Martin Rominger	(United States) 3 & 1	Chris Nallen
Rhys Davies	(Europe) 3 & 2	Matt Every
Francesco Molinari	halved	Jack Ferguson
Gareth Maybin	(United States) 2 & 1	Jason Hartwick
Alex Norén	(United States) 2 & 1	Chris Stroud
Lars Brovold	(Europe) 8 & 6	Billy Hurley III
Gonzalo Fdez-Castaño	(Europe) 4 & 3	Ryan Moore
4½	Singles	3½
14½	Overall	9½

== Michael Carter award ==
The Michael Carter Award winners were Gareth Maybin and Chris Stroud.
