= 2010 Palmer Cup =

Team golf competition in Northern Ireland

- Dates: 24–26 June 2010
- Venue: Royal Portrush Golf Club
- Location: Portrush, County Antrim, Northern Ireland
(Europe)	11	13	(United States)
- United States wins the Palmer Cup

The 2010 Palmer Cup was held on 24–26 June 2010 at the Royal Portrush Golf Club in Portrush, County Antrim, Northern Ireland. The United States won 13–11.

== Format ==
The format was revised with play being over three days rather than two. On Thursday, there were four matches of four-ball in the morning, followed by four foursomes matches in the afternoon. Eight singles matches were played on Friday, and eight more on Saturday. In all, 24 matches were played.

Each of the 24 matches was worth one point in the larger team competition. If a match was all square after the 18th hole, each side earned half a point toward their team total. The team that accumulated at least 12½ points won the competition.

== Teams ==
Eight college golfers from Europe and the United States participated in the event.

Europe
Name	Country	College
Dean Robertson head coach	Scotland	
Walle Danewid assistant coach	Sweden	
James Byrne	Scotland	Arizona State
Rhys Enoch	Wales	East Tennessee State
Jesper Kennegård	Sweden	Arizona State
David Lingmerth	Sweden	Arkansas
Henrik Norlander	Sweden	Augusta State
Andrea Pavan	Italy	Texas A&M
Patrick Spraggs	England	Stirling
Pontus Widegren	Sweden	UCLA

United States
Name	College
Chris Zambri head coach	Southern California
Brian Sharp assistant coach	Virginia Tech
Tyson Alexander	Florida
John Chin	UC Irvine
David Chung	Stanford
Russell Henley	Georgia
Scott Langley	Illinois
Daniel Miernicki	Oregon
Corey Nagy	Charlotte
Jonathan Randolph	Mississippi

== Thursday's matches ==
=== Morning four-ball ===
	Results
Norlander/Widegren	(Europe) 4 & 3	Langley/Nagy
Enoch/Pavan	(Europe) 3 & 2	Chin/Miernicki
Lingmerth/Spraggs	(United States) 1 up	Chung/Randolph
Byrne/Kennegard	(United States) 3 & 1	Alexander/Henley
2	Four-ball	2
2	Overall	2

=== Afternoon foursomes ===
	Results
Enoch/Pavan	(United States) 1 up	Chin/Miernicki
Lingmerth/Spraggs	(United States) 5 & 4	Chung/Randolph
Byrne/Widegren	(United States) 2 up	Langley/Nagy
Kennegard/Norlander	(United States) 1 up	Alexander/Henley
0	Foursomes	4
2	Overall	6

== Friday's singles matches ==
	Results
Henrik Norlander	(Europe) 1 up	Daniel Miernicki
David Lingmerth	(Europe) 2 & 1	John Chin
Pontus Widegren	(Europe) 3 & 2	Corey Nagy
Andrea Pavan	(Europe) 5 & 4	Scott Langley
James Byrne	(United States) 4 & 3	Jonathan Randolph
Rhys Enoch	(United States) 4 & 3	David Chung
Patrick Spraggs	(United States) 2 & 1	Tyson Alexander
Jesper Kennegard	(Europe) 2 & 1	Russell Henley
5	Singles	3
7	Overall	9

== Saturday's singles matches ==
	Results
James Byrne	(United States) 5 & 3	Daniel Miernicki
Henrik Norlander	(United States) 4 & 2	David Chung
David Lingmerth	(Europe) 2 up	Jonathan Randolph
Pontus Widegren	(Europe) 6 & 5	Corey Nagy
Patrick Spraggs	(Europe) 1 up	John Chin
Rhys Enoch	(United States) 1 up	Scott Langley
Andrea Pavan	(Europe) 2 & 1	Tyson Alexander
Jesper Kennegard	(United States) 4 & 2	Russell Henley
4	Singles	4
11	Overall	13

== Michael Carter award ==
The Michael Carter Award winners were Henrik Norlander and Daniel Miernicki.
