= 2006 Palmer Cup =

Team golf competition in Scotland

- Dates: 29–30 June 2006
- Venue: Prestwick Golf Club
- Location: Prestwick, South Ayrshire, Scotland
(Europe)	19½	4½	(United States)
- Europe wins the Palmer Cup

The 2006 Palmer Cup was held on 29–30 June 2006 at Prestwick Golf Club in Prestwick, South Ayrshire, Scotland. Europe won 19½–4½.

== Format ==
On Thursday, there were four matches of four-ball in the morning, followed by eight singles matches in the afternoon. Four foursomes matches were played on the Friday morning with a further eight singles in the afternoon. In all, 24 matches were played.

Each of the 24 matches was worth one point in the larger team competition. If a match was all square after the 18th hole, each side earned half a point toward their team total. The team that accumulated at least 12½ points won the competition.

== Teams ==
Eight college golfers from Europe and the United States participated in the event.

Europe
Name	Country	College
Peter Mattsson head coach	Sweden	
Alejandro Cañizares	Spain	Arizona State
Rhys Davies	Wales	East Tennessee State
Oscar Florén	Sweden	Texas Tech
Mark Haastrup	Denmark	Georgia State
Joost Luiten	Netherlands	Randstad Topsport
Steve Lewton	England	North Carolina State
Pablo Martín	Spain	Oklahoma State
Richie Ramsay	Scotland	Stirling

United States
Name	College
Chris Haack head coach	Georgia
Ryan Baca	Baylor
Ryan Blaum	Duke
Roberto Castro	Georgia Tech
Brian Harman	Georgia
Chris Kirk	Georgia
Kevin Larsen	Georgia Tech
Luke List	Vanderbilt
Clay Ogden	Brigham Young

== Thursday's matches ==
=== Morning four-ball ===
	Results
Cañizares/Martín	(Europe) 5 & 3	Harman/Kirk
Haastrup/Luiten	(Europe) 4 & 3	List/Ogden
Davies/Ramsay	(Europe) 6 & 4	Baca/Blaum
Florén/Lewton	(Europe) 2 & 1	Castro/Larsen
4	Four-ball	0
4	Overall	0

=== Afternoon singles ===
	Results
Pablo Martín	(Europe) 6 & 5	Brian Harman
Alejandro Cañizares	(Europe) 2 & 1	Clay Ogden
Mark Haastrup	(United States) 3 & 2	Ryan Baca
Joost Luiten	(Europe) 1 up	Luke List
Richie Ramsay	(United States) 1 up	Roberto Castro
Oscar Florén	(Europe) 5 & 4	Kevin Larsen
Steve Lewton	(Europe) 1 up	Chris Kirk
Rhys Davies	(Europe) 4 & 3	Ryan Blaum
6	Singles	2
10	Overall	2

== Friday's matches ==
=== Morning foursomes ===
	Results
Cañizares/Martín	(Europe) 6 & 5	Blaum/Castro
Florén/Haastrup	(Europe) 1 up	Baca/Ogden
Luiten/Ramsay	(Europe) 3 & 2	Harman/List
Davies/Lewton	(Europe) 4 & 3	Kirk/Larsen
4	Foursomes	0
14	Overall	2

=== Afternoon singles ===
	Results
Pablo Martín	(Europe) 3 & 2	Roberto Castro
Oscar Florén	(United States) 4 & 2	Ryan Blaum
Mark Haastrup	(Europe) 5 & 3	Brian Harman
Alejandro Cañizares	(Europe) 1 up	Ryan Baca
Joost Luiten	(Europe) 2 up	Kevin Larsen
Steve Lewton	halved	Clay Ogden
Rhys Davies	(Europe) 3 & 2	Luke List
Richie Ramsay	(United States) 1 up	Chris Kirk
5½	Singles	2½
19½	Overall	4½

== Michael Carter award ==
The Michael Carter Award winners were Steve Lewton and Clay Ogden.
