= Western Junior =

National junior golf tournament based in the US

Tournament information
- Location: Hinsdale, Illinois (2024)
- Established: 1914
- Course: Ruth Lake Country Club (2024)
- Format: Stroke play
- Website: thewesternjunior.com

Current champion
- (United States) Hans Risvaer

The Western Junior is the oldest national junior golf tournament in the United States. It was founded in 1914 and is organized by the Western Golf Association. It is played at a different course each year, primarily in the midwest. From 1914 to 1998, it was played with stroke play qualifying followed by a match play championship. Since 1999, it has been a 72-hole stroke play tournament.

The championship was first played in 1914 at Chicago Golf Club in Wheaton, Illinois and was won by Charles Grimes.

The Western Junior draws the top junior players from more than 40 states and internationally each year. The field is limited to 156 entrants. Exemptions into the Western Amateur are awarded to the top three finishers and ties. The tournament has been a testing ground for stars of the future, such as current PGA Tour golfers Collin Morikawa, Scottie Scheffler, and Rickie Fowler, and veterans Tiger Woods, Phil Mickelson, Hunter Mahan, Corey Pavin, and Fred Couples.

== Winners ==
- 2025 Trevor Gutschewski
- 2024 Parker Sands
- 2023 Hans Risvaer
- 2022 Eduardo Derbez Torres
- 2021 Caleb Surratt
- 2020 No tournament
- 2019 Piercen Hunt
- 2018 Jeff Doty
- 2017 William Mouw
- 2016 Sean Maruyama
- 2015 Kevin Yu
- 2014 K. K. Limbhasut
- 2013 Collin Morikawa
- 2012 Adam Wood
- 2011 Connor Black
- 2010 Patrick Rodgers
- 2009 Zack Fischer
- 2008 Cory Whitsett
- 2007 Cody Gribble
- 2006 Jhared Hack
- 2005 Rickie Fowler
- 2004 Jamie Lovemark
- 2003 Brady Schnell
- 2002 Brett Lange
- 2001 Jonathan Moore
- 2000 Buck Williams
- 1999 Hunter Mahan
- 1998 David Wagenseller
- 1997 Nick Cassini
- 1996 Andy Rapp
- 1995 James Driscoll
- 1994 Brad Elder
- 1993 Michael Jones
- 1992 John Curley
- 1991 Trip Kuehne
- 1990 Kelly Mitchum
- 1989 Craig Darling
- 1988 Chris Smith
- 1987 Jim Furyk
- 1986 Jon Worrell
- 1985 Don Edwards
- 1984 Steve LaMontagne
- 1983 Brad Meek
- 1982 Jim Benepe
- 1981 Gregg VonThaden
- 1980 Eugene Elliott
- 1979 Willie Wood
- 1978 Bobby Clampett
- 1977 Gary Wilks
- 1976 Gary Hallberg
- 1975 Britt Harrison
- 1974 Edwin Fisher, Jr.
- 1973 Tommy Jones
- 1972 Dennis Sullivan
- 1971 Richard Brooke
- 1970 Jeff Reaume
- 1969 Jim Simons
- 1968 Don Hawken
- 1967 Mike Goodart
- 1966 Ross Elder
- 1965 John Richart
- 1964 Jim Wiechers
- 1963 George Boutell
- 1962 George Shortridge
- 1961 Phil Marston
- 1960 Labron Harris Jr.
- 1959 Steve Spray
- 1958 Jack Rule, Jr.
- 1957 Don Essig III
- 1956 Dick Foote
- 1955 Gerald McFerren
- 1954 Herbert Klontz
- 1953 Henry Loeb
- 1952 Don Nichols
- 1951 Hillman Robbins
- 1950 Dean Lind
- 1949 Dean Lind
- 1948 Gene Coulter
- 1947 Tom Veech
- 1946 Mac Hunter
- 1943–45 No tournament
- 1942 William Witzleb
- 1941 Ben Downing
- 1940 Ben Downing
- 1939 Sam Kocsis
- 1938 Charles Betcher
- 1937 John Holmstrom
- 1936 Sid Richardson
- 1935 Fred Haas
- 1934 Fred Haas
- 1933 Frank Bredall
- 1932 John Banks
- 1931 Bob Cochran
- 1930 C. K. Collins
- 1929 Fred Lyon
- 1928 Dick Mullin
- 1927 Albert Hakes
- 1926 Sam Alpert
- 1925 Emerson Carey, Jr.
- 1924 Eldridge Robinson
- 1923 Ira Couch
- 1922 Kenneth Hisert
- 1921 Burton Mudge, Jr.
- 1920 Harold Martin
- 1919 Howard Sassman
- 1918 No tournament
- 1917 Frederick Wright
- 1916 John Simpson
- 1915 DeWitt Balch
- 1914 Charles Grimes

== Future sites ==
- 2025 The Harvester Club (Rhodes, Iowa)
