= Foursomes =

Type of match in golf

Foursomes, also known as alternate shot, is a pairs playing format in the sport of golf.

Golfers compete in teams of two, using only one ball per team, and taking alternate shots until the hole is completed. Team members take turns in teeing off on each hole, i.e. one player will take the tee shot on odd-numbered holes, and the other on even-numbered holes.

Foursomes is most commonly played as match play, with each hole being won by the team that completes it in the fewest shots. This form of golf is often played in team golf competitions such as the Ryder Cup, Solheim Cup and the Presidents Cup.

Foursomes can also be played in stroke play competitions, with the winners being the team who have taken the fewest strokes to complete a set number of holes. Since 2000 this format has been used with alternating rounds of four-ball by the World Cup of Golf, and since 2017, again combined with four-ball rounds, by the Zurich Classic on the PGA Tour.

== Variations ==
Greensomes, also known as "Scotch foursomes", follows the same format as foursomes except that both players tee off on every hole. The better ball is chosen and alternate strokes are then played to complete the hole. This format is used at the Bass Pro Shops Legends of Golf, where two rounds are played on a par three course; in each round, nine holes are played as greensomes and nine as better ball.

Bloodsomes, or gruesomes, follows the same format as greensomes except the opposition pairing choose which ball is played.

Chapman, also known as Pinehurst or American foursomes, is a combination of alternate shot and fourball. The pair each play a ball from the tee, play their partner's ball for the second shot, before selecting which ball to complete the hole with. The players then take alternate strokes, with the next (third) being played by the player who hit the chosen ball from the tee. It is named after American amateur golfer Dick Chapman, who collaborated with the USGA in devising the system.

== See also ==
- Four-ball golf
