= Four-ball golf =

Pairs playing format in the game of golf

Four-ball is a pairs playing format in the game of golf. It is also known as better ball or best ball. It is also sometimes abbreviated as 4BBB.

In a stroke play competition, competitors are paired and play as a team. Each golfer plays their own ball; the team's score on each hole is the lower of the two players' scores. Only one of a pair is required to complete each hole. The winners are the team with the lowest aggregate score over a set number of holes. Since 2017 this format, along with foursomes, has been used by the Zurich Classic on the PGA Tour.

In a match play competition, a four-ball consists of two teams of two players competing directly against each other. All four golfers play their own balls throughout the round (rather than alternating shots on a single ball); each hole is won by the team whose member has the lowest score. This form of golf is commonly played in team golf competitions such as the Ryder Cup, Solheim Cup, and Presidents Cup.

== See also ==
- Foursomes
- Celebrity Bowling (adapted the best-ball format for bowling)
