= Arnold Palmer Cup =

Annual team golf competition

Tournament information
- Location: 2026: Tralee, County Kerry, Ireland
- Established: 1997
- Course: 2026: Tralee Golf Club
- Format: Match play

Current champion
- International

The Arnold Palmer Cup is an annual team golf competition for college/university golfers. It is named for Arnold Palmer. From 2018 it has been contested between a United States team and an International team representing the rest of the world. The teams consist of 12 men and 12 women. The teams are selected on the basis of nationality, not according to the location of the players' universities.

The 2026 event was held July 3 to 5 at Tralee Golf Club, in Ireland.

== History ==
From its foundation in 1997 until 2017 the event was only contested by men. From 1997 until 2002 the United States played Great Britain & Ireland while from 2003 to 2017 the United States played a European team. Many of the European players attended American universities as sports scholarships have never been a feature of the university system in Europe. Until 2016, the event was known as the Palmer Cup.

From 1997 until 2013 the match was contested between eight-man teams. There were four four-ball matches, four foursome matches, and two sets of eight singles matches for a total of 24 points. From 2014 the teams were increased from eight to ten with five four-ball matches, five foursome matches, and two sets of ten singles matches for 30 points overall. The order of the four sessions has varied with the match being played over either two or three days.

From 2018 it has been contested between a United States team and an International team representing the rest of the world. The teams consist of 12 men and 12 women.

== Results ==
Year	Winner	Margin	Venue	Location
2026	International	30 1/2–29 1/2	Tralee Golf Club	Ireland
2025	International	35–25	Congaree Golf Club	South Carolina
2024	United States	32 1/2–27 1/2	Lahinch Golf Club	Ireland
2023	United States	32–28	Laurel Valley Golf Club	Pennsylvania
2022	International	33–27	Golf Club de Genève	Switzerland
2021	United States	33–27	Rich Harvest Farms	Illinois
2020	International	40 1/2–19 1/2	Bay Hill Club and Lodge	Florida
2019	International	33 1/2–26 1/2	The Alotian Club	Arkansas
2018	United States	38 1/2–21 1/2	Evian Resort Golf Club	France
2017	United States	19 1/2–10 1/2	Atlanta Athletic Club	Georgia
2016	Europe	18 1/2–11 1/2	Formby Golf Club	England
2015	United States	18–12	Rich Harvest Farms	Illinois
2014	Europe	18 1/2–11 1/2	Walton Heath Golf Club	England
2013	United States	20 1/2–9 1/2	Wilmington Country Club	Delaware
2012	Europe	13 1/2–10 1/2	Royal County Down Golf Club	Northern Ireland
2011	United States	13–11	The Stanwich Club	Connecticut
2010	United States	13–11	Royal Portrush Golf Club	Northern Ireland
2009	Europe	13–11	Cherry Hills Country Club	Colorado
2008	Europe	14–10	Glasgow Golf Club Gailes Links	Scotland
2007	United States	18–6	Caves Valley Golf Club	Maryland
2006	Europe	19 1/2–4 1/2	Prestwick Golf Club	Scotland
2005	United States	14–10	Whistling Straits, Irish Course	Wisconsin
2004	Europe	14 1/2–9 1/2	Ballybunion Golf Club	Ireland
2003	Europe	14–10	Kiawah Island Club, Cassique Course	South Carolina
2002	United States	15 1/2–8 1/2	Doonbeg Golf Club	Ireland
2001	United States	18–6	Baltusrol Golf Club	New Jersey
2000	Great Britain & Ireland	12 1/2–11 1/2	Royal Liverpool Golf Club	England
1999	United States	17 1/2–6 1/2	Honors Course	Tennessee
1998	Tied	12–12	Old Course and New Course	Scotland
1997	United States	19–5	Bay Hill Club and Lodge	Florida

Of the 29 matches, the United States team has won 15, the International/European/Great Britain and Ireland team has won 14, with 1 match tied.

== Michael Carter award ==
The Michael Carter Award was inaugurated in 2002. On February 13, 2002, former Penn State University golfer Michael Carter died in an automobile accident at the age of 19. "The Michael Carter “Junior” Memorial Award is presented to the Arnold Palmer Cup participant from each team who best represents the qualities and ideals that made this young man unique."

== Former participants ==
The following competitors have subsequently played in either the Ryder Cup or the Presidents Cup: Daniel Berger, Kevin Chappell, Ben Curtis, Luke Donald (2), Rickie Fowler, Lucas Glover (2), Bill Haas (2), J. J. Henry, J. B. Holmes, Dustin Johnson, Chris Kirk, Matt Kuchar (2), Hunter Mahan, Graeme McDowell (2), Francesco Molinari, Thomas Pieters, Webb Simpson, Brandt Snedeker, Justin Thomas (2), Oliver Wilson (3).

== See also ==
- Walker Cup
- NCAA Division I Men's Golf Championships
- NCAA Division II Men's Golf Championships
- NCAA Division III Men's Golf Championships
