= 2020 U.S. Open field =

This page lists the criteria used to determine the field for the 2020 U.S. Open at Winged Foot Golf Club, and the players who qualified.

Normally, about half the field at the U.S. Open gain entry via local and sectional qualifying. However, due to the COVID-19 pandemic, in 2020, the entire field consisted of players who were exempt from qualifying. The revised exemption criteria were announced on June 25. Existing exemptions were retained and the field was reduced from 156 down to 144. Among several changes to exemption criteria, additional places were awarded based on performances in tournaments on the PGA and European tours, and many other spots were filled from various ranking and money lists with cut-off dates nearer the rescheduled tournament dates.

== Rule changes ==
The U.S. Amateur champion no longer forfeits his U.S. Open exemption if he turns professional.

== Entrants by eligibility criteria ==
Each player is classified according to the first category in which he qualified, and other categories are shown in parentheses.

=== 1. Previous winners of the U.S. Open ===
Winners of the U.S. Open during the previous ten years:

- Dustin Johnson (11,15)
- Martin Kaymer
- Graeme McDowell (15)
- Rory McIlroy (2,9,11,12,15)
- Justin Rose (2,11,15)
- Webb Simpson (9,11,12,15)
- Jordan Spieth (6,8,15)
- Gary Woodland (2,11,15)
- Brooks Koepka (2,7,11,15) did not play.

=== 2. Leading players from the previous U.S. Open ===
The top 10 and ties at the 2019 U.S. Open:

- Chesson Hadley
- Louis Oosthuizen (11,15)
- Jon Rahm (11,15)
- Chez Reavie (11,15)
- Xander Schauffele (11,15)
- Adam Scott (11,15)
- Henrik Stenson (8,15)

=== 3. Winner of the U.S. Senior Open in 2019 ===
Winner of the 2019 U.S. Senior Open:

- Steve Stricker

=== 4. Winner of the U.S. Amateur in 2019 ===
Winner of the 2019 U.S. Amateur:

- Andy Ogletree (a)

=== 5. Top finishers from USGA amateur tournaments in 2019 ===
Winners of the 2019 U.S. Junior Amateur and 2019 U.S. Mid-Amateur; and runner-up at the 2019 U.S. Amateur: (Note: Players qualifying via these amateur categories must remain an amateur through to completion of the championship.)

- John Augenstein (a)
- Lukas Michel (a)
- Preston Summerhays (a)

=== 6. Recent winners of the Masters Tournament ===
Winners of the Masters Tournament from 2016 to 2019:

- Sergio García (15)
- Patrick Reed (11,12,15)
- Danny Willett (10,15)
- Tiger Woods (15)

=== 7. Recent winners of the PGA Championship ===
Winners of the PGA Championship from 2015 to 2020:

- Jason Day (15)
- Collin Morikawa (15)
- Justin Thomas (11,12,15)
- Jimmy Walker

=== 8. Recent winners of The Open Championship ===
Winners of The Open Championship from 2015 to 2019:

- Zach Johnson
- Shane Lowry (15)
- Francesco Molinari (15) did not play.

=== 9. Recent winners of The Players Championship ===
Winners of The Players Championship from 2018 to 2020:

=== 10. Winner of the BMW PGA Championship in 2019 ===
Winner of the 2019 BMW PGA Championship:

=== 11. Players who qualified for the Tour Championship in 2019 ===
Players who qualified for the season-ending 2019 Tour Championship on the PGA Tour:

- Abraham Ancer (15)
- Patrick Cantlay (15)
- Paul Casey (15)
- Corey Conners (15)
- Bryson DeChambeau (15)
- Tony Finau (15)
- Tommy Fleetwood (15)
- Rickie Fowler (15)
- Lucas Glover
- Charles Howell III
- Im Sung-jae (15)
- Kevin Kisner (15)
- Jason Kokrak
- Matt Kuchar (15)
- Marc Leishman (15)
- Hideki Matsuyama (15)
- Brandt Snedeker (15)

=== 12. Winners of multiple events on the PGA Tour ===
Winners of multiple PGA Tour events that award a full-point allocation for the FedEx Cup, between the 2019 U.S. Open and the originally scheduled date of the 2020 U.S. Open:

=== 13. Winner of The Amateur Championship in 2019 ===
Winner of the 2019 Amateur Championship:

- James Sugrue (a)

=== 14. Winner of the Mark H. McCormack Medal in 2019 ===
Winner of the 2019 Mark H. McCormack Medal (men's World Amateur Golf Ranking):

- Cole Hammer (a)

=== 15. Leading players from the Official World Golf Ranking ===
The top 70 points leaders and ties as of March 15 in the Official World Golf Ranking: (Note: The Official World Golf Ranking was frozen from March 15 through to June 14; originally the top 60 and ties as of May 18 and June 15 would have gained exemption.)

- An Byeong-hun
- Christiaan Bezuidenhout
- Keegan Bradley
- Rafa Cabrera-Bello
- Joel Dahmen
- Matt Fitzpatrick
- Adam Hadwin
- Tyrrell Hatton
- Lucas Herbert
- Billy Horschel
- Viktor Hovland
- Shugo Imahira
- Jazz Janewattananond
- Kang Sung-hoon
- Chan Kim
- Kurt Kitayama
- Tom Lewis
- Robert MacIntyre
- Phil Mickelson
- Kevin Na
- Shaun Norris
- Eddie Pepperell
- Victor Perez
- Ian Poulter
- Andrew Putnam
- Cameron Smith
- Brendon Todd
- Erik van Rooyen
- Matt Wallace
- Bubba Watson
- Lee Westwood
- Bernd Wiesberger
- Scottie Scheffler withdrew after testing positive for COVID-19.

=== 16. Leading finishers from designated tournaments in 2020 ===
==== 16a. The Memorial Tournament ====
The top two players, (Note: Ties will be broken by OWGR.) not otherwise exempt, (Note: As of the beginning of the tournament.) in the top 10 and ties of the 2020 Memorial Tournament:

- Mackenzie Hughes
- Ryan Palmer

==== 16b. 3M Open ====
The top two players, not otherwise exempt, in the top 10 and ties of the 2020 3M Open:

- Adam Long
- Michael Thompson

==== 16c. WGC-FedEx St. Jude Invitational ====
The top two players, not otherwise exempt, in the top 10 and ties of the 2020 WGC-FedEx St. Jude Invitational:

- Daniel Berger

==== 16d. Barracuda Championship ====
The top two players, not otherwise exempt, in the top 10 and ties of the 2020 Barracuda Championship:

- Troy Merritt
- Richy Werenski

==== 16e. PGA Championship ====
The top three players, not otherwise exempt, in the top 10 and ties of the 2020 PGA Championship:

- Cameron Champ
- Matthew Wolff

==== 16f. Wyndham Championship ====
The top two players, not otherwise exempt, in the top 10 and ties of the 2020 Wyndham Championship:

- Jim Herman
- Kim Si-woo

=== 17. Leading players from the FedEx Cup points standings ===
The top five players, not otherwise exempt, (Note: As of the start of the Tour Championship.) from the final 2019–20 FedEx Cup standings:

- Tyler Duncan
- Brian Harman
- Mark Hubbard
- Danny Lee
- Sebastián Muñoz

=== 18. Leading players from the European Tour's UK Swing ===
The top ten aggregate point earners, not otherwise exempt, in the five European Tour events from the Betfred British Masters through the ISPS Handa Wales Open:

- Thomas Detry
- Justin Harding
- Rasmus Højgaard
- Romain Langasque
- Adrián Otaegui
- Renato Paratore
- Andy Sullivan
- Connor Syme
- Sami Välimäki
- Sam Horsfield withdrew after testing positive for COVID-19.

=== 19. Leading players from the Korn Ferry Tour regular season points standings ===
The top five players, not otherwise exempt, (Note: As of the start of the WinCo Foods Portland Open.) from the 2020 Korn Ferry Tour Regular Season Points List through the WinCo Foods Portland Open:

- Paul Barjon
- Lee Hodges
- Taylor Pendrith
- Davis Riley
- Will Zalatoris

=== 20. Leading players from the Korn Ferry Tour Championship Series ===
The top five aggregate point earners, not otherwise exempt, (Note: As of the start of the Korn Ferry Tour Championship.) from the three Korn Ferry Tour events beginning with the Albertsons Boise Open through the Korn Ferry Tour Championship:

- Stephan Jäger
- Curtis Luck
- Dan McCarthy
- Greyson Sigg
- Brandon Wu

=== 21. Leading players from the Japan Golf Tour in 2019 ===
The top two players, not otherwise exempt as of July 15, from the 2019 Japan Golf Tour Order of Merit:

- Ryo Ishikawa
- Hwang Jung-gon did not play due to mandatory military service in South Korea.

=== 22. Leading player from the Sunshine Tour in 2019–20 ===
The top player, not otherwise exempt as of July 15, from the 2019–20 Sunshine Tour Order of Merit:

- J. C. Ritchie

=== 23. Leading player from the Asian Tour in 2019 ===
The top player, not otherwise exempt as of July 15, from the 2019 Asian Tour Order of Merit:

- Scott Hend

=== 24. Leading player from the PGA Tour of Australasia in 2019 ===
The top player, not otherwise exempt as of July 15, from the 2019 PGA Tour of Australasia Order of Merit:

- Ryan Fox

=== 25. Leading PGA professionals ===
The top three players from the 2019 PGA Professional Player of the Year Standings: (Note: Criteria changed following cancellation of the 2020 PGA Professional Championship; originally set to be the top three players (not otherwise exempt) in that tournament.)

- Danny Balin
- Marty Jertson
- Ryan Vermeer

=== 26. Leading amateur players ===
The top seven players, not otherwise exempt, from the August 19 World Amateur Golf Ranking:

- Ricky Castillo (a)
- Takumi Kanaya (a)
- John Pak (a)
- Eduard Rousaud (a)
- Sandy Scott (a)
- Davis Thompson (a)
- Kevin Yu (a)

=== 27. Leading players from the Official World Golf Ranking ===
Remaining places in the field, as well as alternate positions, are allocated based on the August 23 Official World Golf Ranking:

- Kevin Streelman (48th)
- Harris English (53rd)
- J. T. Poston (68th)
- Joaquín Niemann (71st)
- Thomas Pieters (73rd)
- Max Homa (75th)
- Lanto Griffin (78th)
- Mike Lorenzo-Vera (79th)
- Matthias Schwab (84th)
- Alex Norén (87th)
- Matt Jones (89th)

==== 27.1 Alternates ====
- Paul Waring (90th) – replaced Brooks Koepka
- Branden Grace (91st) – replaced Scottie Scheffler
- Rory Sabbatini (92nd) – replaced Sam Horsfield

=== 28. Special exemptions ===
Special exemptions given by the USGA:

- No players were given special exemptions.
