= 2020 Arnold Palmer Cup =

Team golf competition in the United States

- Dates: December 21–23, 2020
- Venue: Bay Hill Club and Lodge
- Location: Bay Hill, Florida
USA	19½	40½	International
- International team wins the Arnold Palmer Cup

The 2020 Arnold Palmer Cup was a team golf competition held from December 21–23, 2020 at Bay Hill Club and Lodge, Bay Hill, Florida. It was the 24th time the event had been contested and the third under the new format in which women golfers played in addition to men and an international team, representing the rest of the world, replaced the European team. The international team won the match 40½–19½.

The event was originally planned to be played at Lahinch Golf Club, Lahinch, Ireland from July 3–5 but was moved because of the COVID-19 pandemic.

== Format ==
The contest was played over three days. On Monday, there were 12 mixed four-ball matches. On Tuesday there were 12 mixed foursomes matches in the morning and 12 fourball matches in the afternoon, six all-women matches and six all-men matches. 24 singles matches were played on Wednesday. In all, 60 matches were played.

Each of the 60 matches was worth one point in the larger team competition. If a match was all square after the 18th hole, each side earned half a point toward their team total. The team that accumulated at least 30½ points won the competition.

== Teams ==
The teams were announced in March 2020, before the postponement of the event. A number of players were unable to compete and were replaced. Four replacements were announced on December 4, 2020 and another on December 15. For the United States, Kaitlin Milligan and Andy Ogletree were in the original teams, while Vivian Hou, Aline Krauter and Hazel MacGarvie were in the International team announced in March 2020. Ogletree had turned professional before the event.

William Mouw (Pepperdine), a member of the American team, was a late withdrawal and was not replaced. On the first day his partner, Megan Schofill, played the fourball match alone. In the other three sessions, matches involving him were deemed to be tied.

The head coaches were announced in August 2019 with the assistant coaches selected in September 2019.

United States
Name	College	Qualification method
Alan Bratton	non-playing head coach	
Dan Brooks	non-playing head coach	
Kate Golden	non-playing assistant coach	
Armen Kirakossian	non-playing assistant coach	
Women
Addie Baggarly	Florida	Arnold Palmer Cup Ranking
Allisen Corpuz	USC	Replacement
Allyson Geer	Michigan State	Arnold Palmer Cup Ranking
Jaime Jacob	Cal State San Marcos	Committee selection
Julia Johnson	Ole Miss	Arnold Palmer Cup Ranking
Gina Kim	Duke	Committee selection
Rachel Kuehn	Wake Forest	Arnold Palmer Cup Ranking
Emilia Migliaccio	Wake Forest	Committee selection
Kaitlyn Papp	Texas	Committee selection
Megan Schofill	Auburn	Committee selection
Latanna Stone	LSU	Arnold Palmer Cup Ranking
Kenzie Wright	Alabama	Arnold Palmer Cup Ranking
Men
John Augenstein	Vanderbilt	Arnold Palmer Cup Ranking
Jonathan Brightwell	UNC Greensboro	Replacement
Ricky Castillo	Florida	Committee selection
Pierceson Coody	Texas	Committee selection
Quade Cummins	Oklahoma	Arnold Palmer Cup Ranking
Cooper Dossey	Baylor	Arnold Palmer Cup Ranking
Evan Katz	Duke	Arnold Palmer Cup Ranking
John Pak	Florida State	Committee selection
Garett Reband	Oklahoma	Arnold Palmer Cup Ranking
Davis Thompson	Georgia	Committee selection
Zach Zediker	Delta State	Committee selection

International
Name	Country	College	Qualification method
Alan Murray	Ireland	non-playing head coach	
Ria Quiazon Scott	Philippines	non-playing head coach	
Sofie Aagaard	Sweden	non-playing assistant coach	
Barry Fennelly	Ireland	non-playing assistant coach	
Women
Alyaa Abdulghany	Malaysia	USC	Replacement
Sofia Garcia	Paraguay	Texas Tech	Committee selection
Linn Grant	Sweden	Arizona State	Arnold Palmer Cup Ranking
Sophie Guo	China	Texas	Arnold Palmer Cup Ranking
Ingrid Lindblad	Sweden	LSU	Committee selection
Olivia Mehaffey	Ireland	Arizona State	Committee selection
Pauline Roussin-Bouchard	France	South Carolina	Committee selection
Gabriela Ruffels	Australia	USC	Replacement
Emma Spitz	Austria	UCLA	Arnold Palmer Cup Ranking
Maja Stark	Sweden	Oklahoma State	Replacement
Kaleigh Telfer	South Africa	Auburn	Arnold Palmer Cup Ranking
Angelina Ye	China	Stanford	Committee selection
Men
Ludvig Åberg	Sweden	Texas Tech	Committee selection
Puwit Anupansuebsai	Thailand	San Diego State	Arnold Palmer Cup Ranking
Sam Choi	South Korea	New Mexico	Arnold Palmer Cup Ranking
Alex Fitzpatrick	England	Wake Forest	Committee selection
Angus Flanagan	England	Minnesota	Arnold Palmer Cup Ranking
Lin Yuxin	China	USC	Arnold Palmer Cup Ranking
Vincent Norrman	Sweden	Georgia Southwestern State	Committee selection
Adrien Pendaries	France	Duke	Arnold Palmer Cup Ranking
Mark Power	Ireland	Wake Forest	Arnold Palmer Cup Ranking
David Puig	Spain	Arizona State	Committee selection
Caolan Rafferty	Ireland	Maynooth	Committee selection
Matti Schmid	Germany	Louisville	Committee selection

== Monday's mixed fourball matches ==
Match	International	Results	United States
1	Pendaries/Roussin-Bouchard	2 & 1	Baggarly/Castillo
2	Fitzpatrick/Ruffels	1 up	Dossey/Migliaccio
3	Mehaffey/Rafferty	1 up	Cummins/Jacob
4	Choi/Garcia	4 & 3	Zediker/Corpuz
5	Flanagan/Abdulghany	2 & 1	Stone/Thompson
6	Grant/Norrman	tied	Johnson/Reband
7	Lindblad/Puig	6 & 5	Wright/Brightwell
8	Anupansuebsai/Guo	2 & 1	Schofill/
9	Power/Telfer	3 & 2	Katz/Kim
10	Åberg/Stark	2 & 1	Augenstein/Geer
11	Lin/Ye	tied	Kuehn/Pak
12	Schmid/Spitz	3 & 2	Coody/Papp
	9	Session	3
	9	Overall	3

== Tuesday's matches ==
=== Morning mixed foursomes matches ===
Match	Tee	International	Results	United States
13	1	Grant/Stark	4 & 3	Geer/Migliaccio
14	10	Pendaries/Schmid	1 up	Castillo/Pak
15	1	Fitzpatrick/Power	6 & 4	Augenstein/Thompson
16	10	Garcia/Lindblad	1 up	Kim/Wright
17	1	Mehaffey/Telfer	3 & 2	Baggarly/Schofill
18	10	Anupansuebsai/Choi	1 up	Cummins/Dossey
19	1	Lin/Puig	5 & 4	Katz/Zediker
20	10	Abdulghany/Guo	1 up	Johnson/Stone
21	1	Roussin-Bouchard/Spitz	3 & 2	Jacob/Kuehn
22	10	Åberg/Norrman	4 & 3	Coody/Reband
23	1		tied
24	10	Ruffels/Ye	3 & 2	Corpuz/Papp
		10½	Session	1½
		19½	Overall	4½

=== Afternoon fourball matches ===
Match	Tee	International	Results	United States
25	1	Pendaries/Roussin-Bouchard	4 & 2	Augenstein/Geer
26	10	Power/Telfer	3 & 1	Baggarly/Castillo
27	1	Fitzpatrick/Ruffels	3 & 2	Cummins/Schofill
28	10	Mehaffey/Rafferty	1 up	Katz/Kim
29	1	Schmid/Spitz	2 up	Brightwell/Wright
30	10	Abdulghany/Flanagan	1 up	Dossey/Migliaccio
31	1	Grant/Norrman	tied	Kuehn/Pak
32	10	Choi/Garcia	4 & 3	Corpuz/Thompson
33	1	Lin/Ye	3 & 1	Jacob/Zediker
34	10	Åberg/Stark	2 & 1	Johnson/Reband
35	1	Lindblad/Puig	2 & 1	Coody/Papp
36	10		tied
		7	Session	5
		26½	Overall	9½

== Wednesday's singles matches ==
Match	Tee	International	Results	United States
37	1	Olivia Mehaffey	tied	Rachel Kuehn
38	10	Mark Power	3 & 2	Quade Cummins
39	1	Caolan Rafferty	1 up	Evan Katz
40	10	David Puig	1 up	Cooper Dossey
41	1	Pauline Roussin-Bouchard	1 up	Megan Schofill
42	10	Ingrid Lindblad	2 & 1	Kaitlyn Papp
43	1	Ludvig Åberg	5 & 4	Zach Zediker
44	10	Maja Stark	tied	Allyson Geer
45	1	Matti Schmid	2 & 1	John Augenstein
46	10	Alex Fitzpatrick	tied	Davis Thompson
47	1	Lin Yuxin	8 & 6	Jonathan Brightwell
48	10	Alyaa Abdulghany	4 & 3	Gina Kim
49	1	Linn Grant	3 & 1	Allisen Corpuz
50	10	Vincent Norrman	2 & 1	John Pak
51	1	Adrien Pendaries	4 & 2	Pierceson Coody
52	10	Emma Spitz	1 up	Kenzie Wright
53	1	Kaleigh Telfer	2 up	Addie Baggarly
54	10	Angus Flanagan	6 & 5	Ricky Castillo
55	1	Puwit Anupansuebsai	3 & 2	Garett Reband
56	10	Angelina Ye	3 & 2	Julia Johnson
57	1	Sofia Garcia	2 & 1	Jaime Jacob
58	10	Gabriela Ruffels	2 & 1	Latanna Stone
59	1	Sophie Guo	5 & 4	Emilia Migliaccio
60	10		tied
		14	Session	10
		40½	Overall	19½

== Michael Carter award ==
The Michael Carter Award winners were John Pak and Puwit Anupansuebsai.
