= 2021 Walker Cup =

Golf tournament

48th Walker Cup Match
- Dates: May 8–9, 2021
- Venue: Seminole Golf Club
- Location: Juno Beach, Florida
- Captains: Nathaniel Crosby (USA); Stuart Wilson (GB&I)
(United States)	14	12	(United Kingdom) (Republic of Ireland)
- United States wins the Walker Cup

Location map
- Location in the United States Location in Florida

The 48th Walker Cup Match was held May 8–9, 2021, in the United States at Seminole Golf Club in Juno Beach, Florida. It was the first time the Walker Cup was played in Florida. The United States won by 14 points to 12.

== Format ==
On Saturday, were four matches of foursomes in the morning and eight singles matches in the afternoon. On Sunday, there were again four matches of foursomes in the morning, followed by ten singles matches (involving every player) in the afternoon. In all, 26 matches were played.

Each of the 26 matches was worth one point in the larger team competition. If a match was all square after the 18th hole extra holes are not played. Rather, each side earned ½ a point toward their team total. The team that accumulated at least 13½ points won the competition. In the event of a tie, the previous winner retained the Cup.

== Teams ==
=== U.S. team ===
Tyler Strafaci was the first player to qualify for the team, by winning the 2020 U.S. Amateur. Ricky Castillo, John Pak and Davis Thompson were the next players to make the team, as the top three Americans in the World Amateur Golf Ranking as on February 10, 2021. The remaining members of the team were announced on March 1, 2021. Two alternates for the team were also announced: Mac Meissner and Garett Reband. Reband later decided not travel to the venue and was replaced as the second alternate by Cooper Dossey.

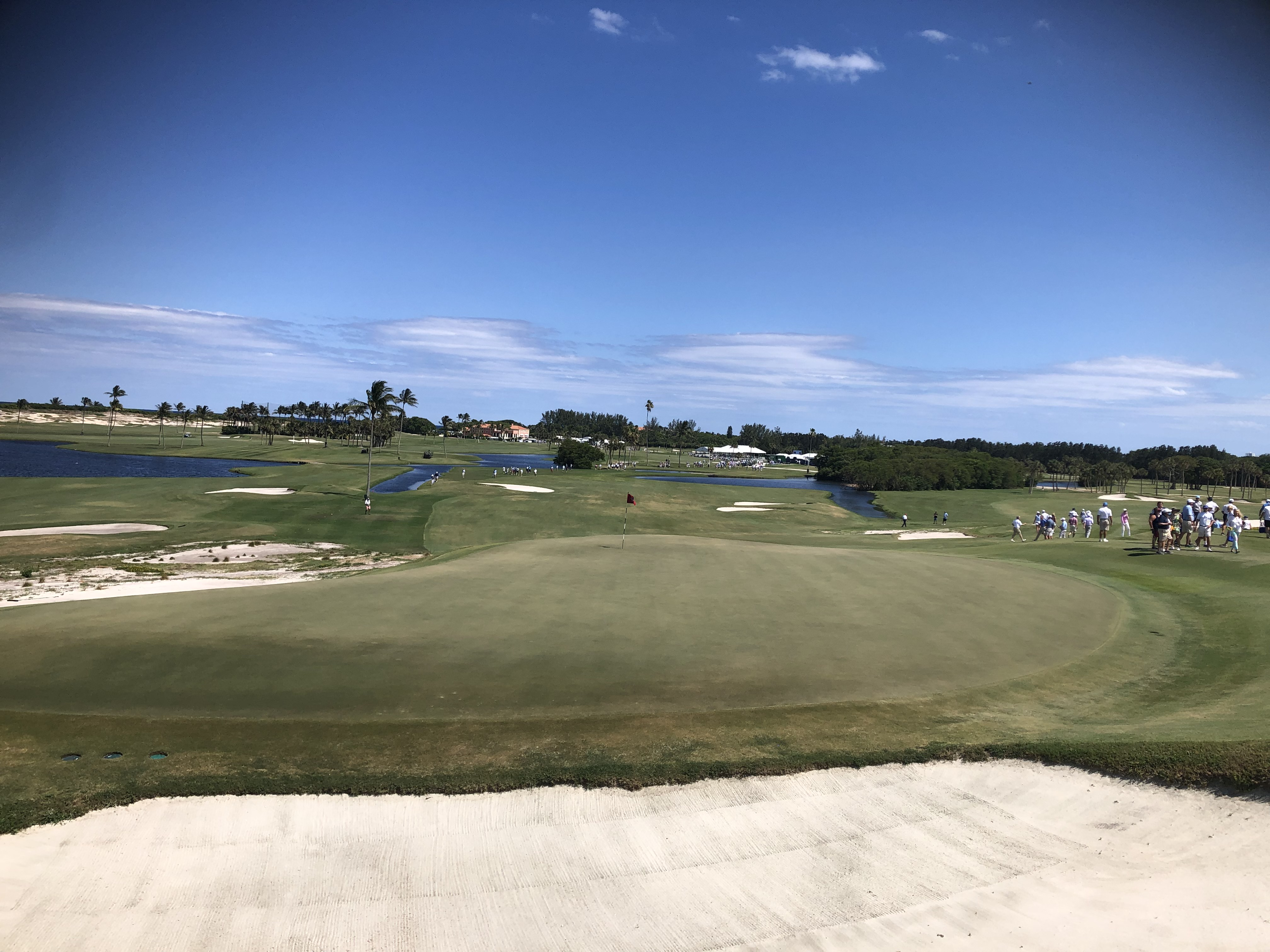
Par 4 second hole

USA
Name	Rank	Age	Notes
Nathaniel Crosby		59	non-playing captain
Ricky Castillo	10	20
Pierceson Coody	2	21
Quade Cummins	16	25
Austin Eckroat	11	22
Stewart Hagestad	17	30	Played in 2017 and 2019
Cole Hammer	14	21	Played in 2019
William Mouw	34	20
John Pak	4	22	Played in 2019
Tyler Strafaci	9	22
Davis Thompson	3	21
Mac Meissner	19	22	Alternate

=== Great Britain and Ireland team ===
The Great Britain and Ireland team was announced on March 30, 2021. Joe Long gained automatic selection by winning the 2020 Amateur Championship. Two more players were automatic selections as the leading two in the World Amateur Golf Ranking: Sandy Scott and Alex Fitzpatrick. The travelling reserves were Jack Dyer and Jake Bolton. Scott later withdrew because of a wrist injury and was replaced by Dyer, Joe Pagdin being added as the second reserve.

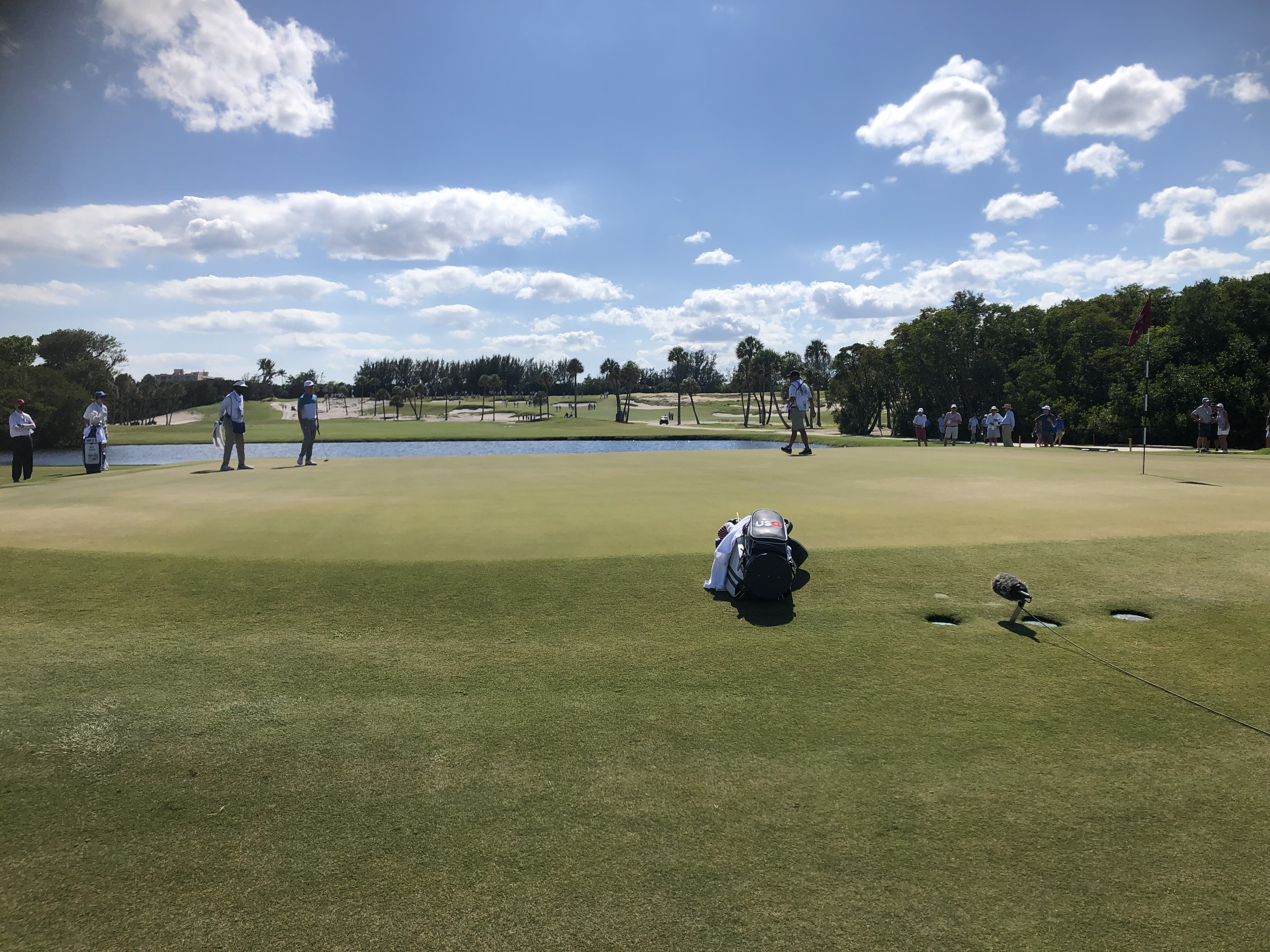
Hole 7 at Seminole

& Great Britain & Ireland
Name	Rank	Age	Notes
(Scotland) Stuart Wilson		43	non-playing captain
(England) Barclay Brown	79	20
(England) Jack Dyer	190	23
(England) Alex Fitzpatrick	12	22	Played in 2019
(England) Angus Flanagan	42	21
(England) Ben Jones	54	22
(England) Matty Lamb	107	23
(England) Joe Long	27	23
(Republic of Ireland) John Murphy	114	22
(Republic of Ireland) Mark Power	29	20
(England) Ben Schmidt	33	18
(England) Jake Bolton	57	22	Reserve

Note: "Rank" is the World Amateur Golf Ranking as of the start of the Cup.

== Saturday's matches ==
A number of players from both teams were affected by gastrointestinal illness. As a result, the rules were changed so that if players were unable to compete, the captains could use the two alternates/reserves that were present at the venue. The original players were used in later matches when they became healthy.

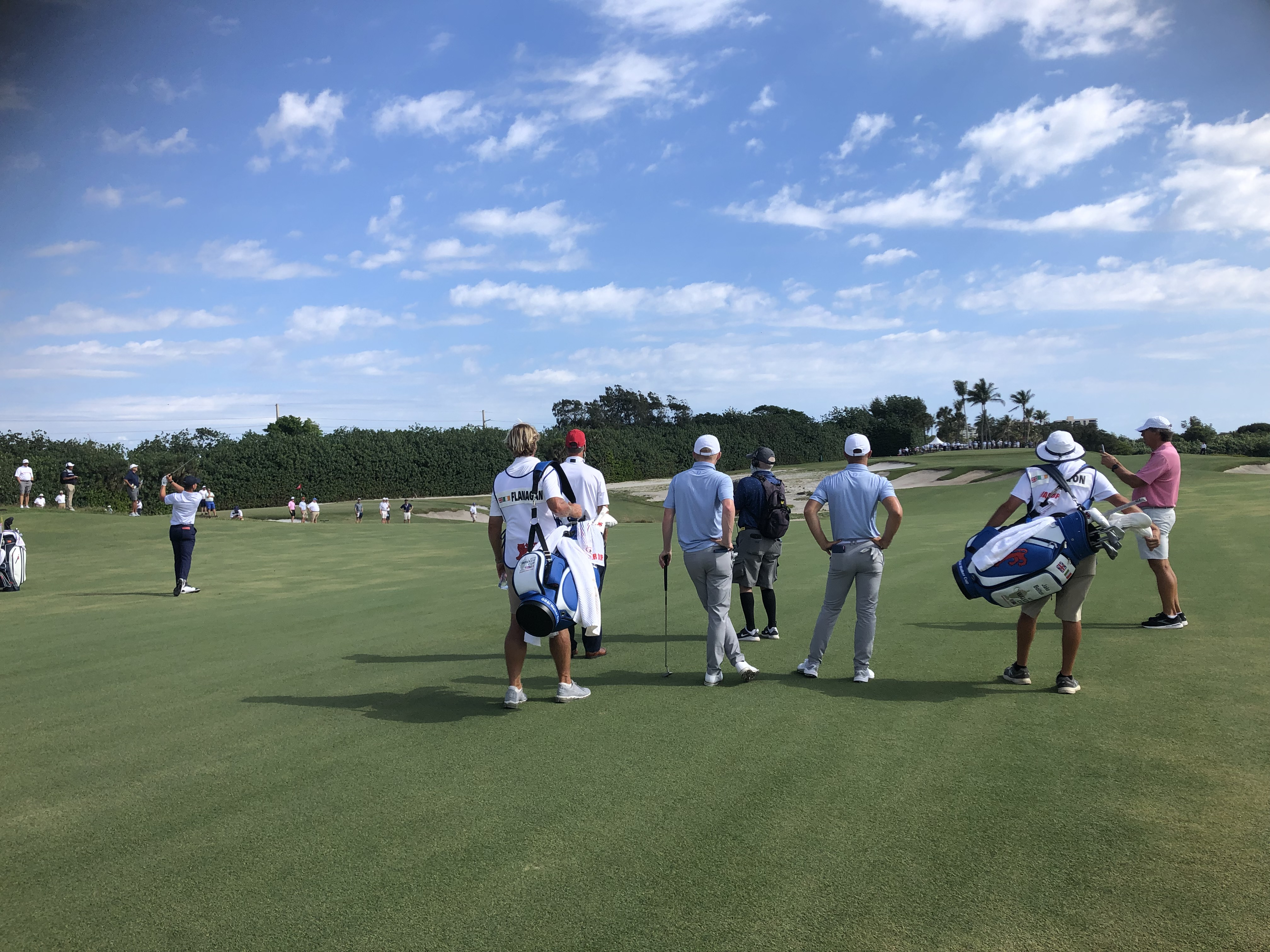
William Mouw approach shot on 4th hole in Saturday morning foursomes

=== Morning foursomes ===
Mac Meissner, the first American alternate, and Jake Bolton, the first reserve for the Great Britain and Ireland team were used in the morning foursomes.

&	Results
Fitzpatrick/Brown	(United States) 1 up	Hammer/Thompson
Power/Murphy	(United Kingdom) (Republic of Ireland) 1 up	Cummins/Eckroat
Dyer/Lamb	(United States) 2 up	Meissner/Castillo
Flanagan/Bolton	(United Kingdom) (Republic of Ireland) 1 up	Hagestad/Mouw
2	Foursomes	2
2	Overall	2

=== Afternoon singles ===
&	Results
Alex Fitzpatrick	(United States) 2 up	Pierceson Coody
Mark Power	(United Kingdom) (Republic of Ireland) 3 & 2	Davis Thompson
Ben Schmidt	(United States) 5 & 3	Ricky Castillo
Ben Jones	(United States) 4 & 3	Tyler Strafaci
Matty Lamb	(United Kingdom) (Republic of Ireland) 2 & 1	Quade Cummins
Angus Flanagan	(United States) 1 up	Austin Eckroat
Barclay Brown	(United Kingdom) (Republic of Ireland) 2 & 1	John Pak
John Murphy	(United States) 3 & 1	Cole Hammer
3	Singles	5
5	Overall	7

== Sunday's matches ==
=== Morning foursomes ===
&	Results
Power/Murphy	(United Kingdom) (Republic of Ireland) 1 up	Coody/Pak
Fitzpatrick/Brown	(United States) 1 up	Castillo/Mouw
Flanagan/Schmidt	tied	Thompson/Hammer
Lamb/Dyer	(United Kingdom) (Republic of Ireland) 6 & 5	Hagestad/Strafaci
2 1/2	Foursomes	1 1/2
7 1/2	Overall	8 1/2

=== Afternoon singles ===
&	Results
Mark Power	(United States) 7 & 6	Austin Eckroat
Alex Fitzpatrick	(United States) 3 & 1	Pierceson Coody
Joe Long	(United Kingdom) (Republic of Ireland) 1 up	John Pak
Matty Lamb	(United Kingdom) (Republic of Ireland) 2 up	Davis Thompson
Barclay Brown	tied	Quade Cummins
Angus Flanagan	(United Kingdom) (Republic of Ireland) 1 up	William Mouw
John Murphy	(United States) 2 & 1	Ricky Castillo
Jack Dyer	(United Kingdom) (Republic of Ireland) 1 up	Tyler Strafaci
Ben Schmidt	(United States) 4 & 3	Cole Hammer
Ben Jones	(United States) 4 & 2	Stewart Hagestad
4 1/2	Singles	5 1/2
12	Overall	14
