= 2020 U.S. Open (golf) =

Coordinates: 40.958°N 73.754°W

Tournament information
- Dates: September 17–20, 2020
- Location: Mamaroneck, New York
- Courses: Winged Foot Golf Club; West Course
- Organized by: USGA
- Tours: PGA Tour; European Tour; Japan Golf Tour

Statistics
- Par: 70
- Length: 7,477 yards (6,837 m)
- Field: 144, 62 after cut
- Cut: 146 (+6)
- Prize fund: $12,500,000 €10,550,000
- Winner's share: $2,250,000 €1,899,000

Champion
- (United States) Bryson DeChambeau
- 274 (−6)
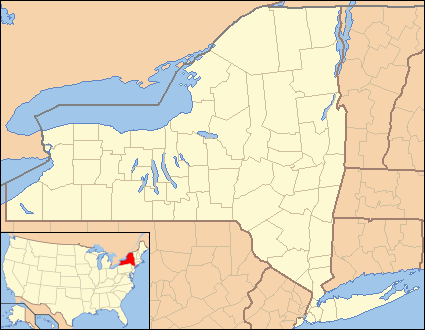
- Location in United States Location in New York state

The 2020 United States Open Championship was the 120th U.S. Open, held September 17–20 over the West Course at Winged Foot Golf Club in Mamaroneck, New York, a suburb northeast of New York City. Originally scheduled for June 18–21, the championship was postponed three months due to the COVID-19 pandemic and was played without spectators. It was the first U.S. Open held in September in 107 years.

Bryson DeChambeau won his first major title with a six-under-par 274. His final round 67 (−3) was three strokes better than the rest of the field and turned a two-stroke deficit into a six-stroke victory margin over runner-up Matthew Wolff, the 54-hole leader who shot 75. In his five previous U.S. Opens, DeChambeau's best result was a tie for fifteenth. The 21-year-old Wolff was attempting to become the youngest U.S. Open champion since Bobby Jones in 1923 and the first to win in his U.S. Open debut since amateur Francis Ouimet in 1913.

== Course ==
It was the sixth time the U.S. Open had been held on West Course at Winged Foot, regarded as one of the toughest courses in major championship golf. Previously in 2006, Geoff Ogilvy won with a five-over-par 285; and Hale Irwin won with 287 (+7) in 1974, later dubbed the "Massacre at Winged Foot."

The A. W. Tillinghast designed course underwent renovations starting in 2017 under the guidance of architect Gil Hanse, with the overall length being increased and the designated par of the 5th and 9th holes being switched from the last time it hosted the U.S. Open; the 5th becoming a par 4 and the 9th a par 5.

Hole	Name	Yards	Par	Hole	Name	Yards	Par
1	Genesis	451	4	10	Pulpit	214	3
2	Elm	484	4	11	Billows	384	4
3	Pinnacle	243	3	12	Cape	633	5
4	Sound View	467	4	13	White Mule	212	3
5	Long Lane	502	4	14	Shamrock	452	4
6	El	321	4	15	Pyramid	426	4
7	Babe-in-the-Woods	162	3	16	Hells Bells	498	4
8	Arena	490	4	17	Well-Well	504	4
9	Meadow	565	5	18	Revelations	469	4
Out		3,685	35	In		3,792	35
				Total		7,477	70

Lengths of the course for previous majors:

- 7,264 yards (6,642 m), par 70 – 2006 U.S. Open
- 6,987 yards (6,389 m), par 70 – 1997 PGA Championship
- 6,930 yards (6,340 m), par 70 – 1984 U.S. Open
- 6,961 yards (6,365 m), par 70 – 1974 U.S. Open
- 6,873 yards (6,285 m), par 70 – 1959 U.S. Open
- 6,786 yards (6,205 m), par 72 – 1929 U.S. Open

2020 yardages by round

Round	Hole	1	2	3	4	5	6	7	8	9	Out	10	11	12	13	14	15	16	17	18	In	Total
	Par	4	4	3	4	4	4	3	4	5	35	3	4	5	3	4	4	4	4	4	35	70
1	Yards	455	477	231	453	483	329	165	478	566	3,637	207	373	643	215	449	422	497	507	466	3,779	7,416
2	Yards	448	489	224	476	514	328	148	495	557	3,679	228	370	615	217	459	437	488	501	465	3,780	7,459
3	Yards	447	493	214	478	500	332	154	485	572	3,675	202	375	623	227	452	424	489	500	474	3,766	7,441
4	Yards	452	479	247	457	514	307	170	503	556	3,685	198	365	577	224	444	440	508	516	472	3,744	7,429

- Scoring average: 74.018
  - by round: 72.561, 75.275, 73.629, 74.900
- Most difficult holes in relation to par: 3, 18, 2, 5, and 10

== Field ==
Normally, about half the field qualifies for the U.S. Open via local and sectional qualifying. However, due to the COVID-19 pandemic, in 2020, the entire field consisted of players who were exempt from qualifying. The revised exemption criteria were announced on June 25. Existing exemptions were retained and the field was reduced from 156 to 144. Among several changes to exemption criteria, additional places were awarded based on performances in tournaments on the PGA and European tours, and many other spots were filled from various ranking and money lists with cut-off dates nearer the rescheduled tournament dates.

Ten past U.S. Open champions were in the field. They were Lucas Glover, world number one Dustin Johnson, Martin Kaymer, Graeme McDowell, Rory McIlroy, Justin Rose, Webb Simpson, Jordan Spieth, defending champion Gary Woodland, and three-time winner Tiger Woods. 2017 and 2018 champion Brooks Koepka did not play due to injury.

=== Rule changes ===
Due to a rule change, the U.S. Amateur champion no longer forfeits his U.S. Open exemption if he turns professional.

== Weather ==
- Thursday: Partly cloudy. High of 78 °F/26 °C. Wind SW 6-10 mph.
- Friday: Partly cloudy. High of 70 °F/21 °C. Wind N 10-15 mph.
- Saturday: Mostly sunny and cooler with a high of 64 °F/18 °C. Wind NNW 6-12 mph.
- Sunday: Mostly sunny with a high of 62 °F/17 °C. Wind NE 16-20 mph.

== Round summaries ==
=== First round ===
Thursday, September 17, 2020

2017 PGA Champion and world number three Justin Thomas returned a five-under-par round of 65, the lowest round ever recorded in a U.S. Open at Winged Foot, to take the first round lead. One stroke behind were Thomas Pieters, Matthew Wolff, and 2018 Masters champion Patrick Reed, who made a hole-in-one on the par-3 seventh hole.

Louis Oosthuizen played his final nine holes in five under par to join Lee Westwood and 2011 U.S. Open champion Rory McIlroy in a tie for fifth place at three under par; Oosthuizen's round was his eighth time shooting 67 or better at the U.S. Open, a new tournament record. Six players tied at two under par, three strokes off the lead.

The scoring average for the first round was 72.56, the second-lowest for a first round in U.S. Open history behind 1993. Twenty-one players finished the round under par; just twelve under-par rounds were completed during the entire tournament the last time the U.S. Open was held at Winged Foot in 2006.

Place	Player	Score	To par
1	(United States) Justin Thomas	65	−5
T2	(Belgium) Thomas Pieters	66	−4
T2	(United States) Patrick Reed	66	−4
T2	(United States) Matthew Wolff	66	−4
T5	(Northern Ireland) Rory McIlroy	67	−3
T5	(South Africa) Louis Oosthuizen	67	−3
T5	(England) Lee Westwood	67	−3
T8	(Spain) Rafa Cabrera-Bello	68	−2
T8	(United States) Harris English	68	−2
T8	(United States) Jason Kokrak	68	−2
T8	(Chile) Joaquín Niemann	68	−2
T8	(United States) Xander Schauffele	68	−2
T8	(United States) Brendon Todd	68	−2

=== Second round ===
Friday, September 18, 2020

Patrick Reed made five birdies and five bogeys in an even-par round of 70 to take the 36-hole lead at four-under par. Bryson DeChambeau hit his second shot on the par-5 9th hole, his final hole of the day, to six feet and converted the eagle putt to return a two-under-par round of 68, the lowest round of the day, and move into second place, one stroke behind Reed. Overnight leader Justin Thomas made four bogeys in his first eight holes and a double-bogey on the 1st, his 10th, before finishing with two birdies to return a three-over-par round of 73 to tie for third place alongside Harris English and Rafa Cabrera-Bello.

Jason Kokrak followed an opening round 68 with a one-over par 71 to sit alone in 6th place at one under par, three strokes off the lead. A stroke further behind were Hideki Matsuyama (69), Xander Schauffele (72), Brendon Todd (72), Thomas Pieters (74) and Matthew Wolff (74). After starting with a birdie, Rory McIlroy made seven bogeys, a double-bogey and just two further birdies to finish at six over par for the day and three over par for the tournament. A day after 21 players completed under-par rounds, windier conditions contributed to just three (DeChambeau, Matsuyama, and Bubba Watson) managing to do so in the second round.

The 36-hole cut came at 146 (six-over par). Among the players to miss the cut were three-time champion Tiger Woods, defending champion Gary Woodland, PGA Champion Collin Morikawa, Phil Mickelson, Tommy Fleetwood, and former U.S. Open champions Jordan Spieth, Justin Rose, Graeme McDowell, and Martin Kaymer. John Pak, a senior at Florida State, was the only amateur to make the cut.

Place	Player	Score	To par
1	(United States) Patrick Reed	66-70=136	−4
2	(United States) Bryson DeChambeau	69-68=137	−3
T3	(Spain) Rafa Cabrera-Bello	68-70=138	−2
T3	(United States) Harris English	68-70=138	−2
T3	(United States) Justin Thomas	65-73=138	−2
6	(United States) Jason Kokrak	68-71=139	−1
T7	(Japan) Hideki Matsuyama	71-69=140	E
T7	(Belgium) Thomas Pieters	66-74=140	E
T7	(United States) Xander Schauffele	68-72=140	E
T7	(United States) Brendon Todd	68-72=140	E
T7	(United States) Matthew Wolff	66-74=140	E

Amateurs: Pak (+5), Kanaya (+7), Thompson (+7), Ogletree (+8), Augenstein (+9), Scott (+9), Summerhays (+9), Yu (+10), Hammer (+11), Castillo (+12), Michel (+17), Sugrue (+17), Rousaud (+21)

=== Third round ===
Saturday, September 19, 2020

Matthew Wolff, making his U.S. Open debut, began the round four strokes off the lead but quickly made up that deficit with five birdies on the front nine. He did not make a bogey until the 16th hole, despite hitting just two of 14 fairways, and closed the round with a 10-foot birdie putt on the 18th hole for a five-under-par round of 65, the lowest round of the day, and a two-stroke lead. At 21, Wolff was the youngest 54-hole leader at the U.S. Open since amateur Jim Simons in 1971.

Bryson DeChambeau bogeyed his first two holes before playing his next 15 in three under par to get within one stroke of Wolff; however, he finished with a bogey on the 18th hole to end the day at three under par, two off the lead. Louis Oosthuizen was the only other player under par after the third round; a two-under-par round of 68, which included three birdies on the back-nine, left him four strokes behind Wolff at one under par. Harris English (72), Hideki Matsuyama (70), and Xander Schauffele (70) were tied for fourth place at even par.

Second-round leader Patrick Reed built a three-stroke advantage with a birdie at the second hole. After nine holes, he retained a share of the lead with Wolff, but he played the back nine in eight over par to tie for 11th place, eight strokes off the lead. After falling away with a second round 76, Rory McIlroy got back into contention at one over par with one of only seven under-par rounds during the day, a two-under-par 68.

Place	Player	Score	To par
1	(United States) Matthew Wolff	66-74-65=205	−5
2	(United States) Bryson DeChambeau	69-68-70=207	−3
3	(South Africa) Louis Oosthuizen	67-74-68=209	−1
T4	(United States) Harris English	68-70-72=210	E
T4	(Japan) Hideki Matsuyama	71-69-70=210	E
T4	(United States) Xander Schauffele	68-72-70=210	E
7	(Northern Ireland) Rory McIlroy	67-76-68=211	+1
T8	(Spain) Rafa Cabrera-Bello	68-70-74=212	+2
T8	(Norway) Viktor Hovland	71-71-70=212	+2
T8	(United States) Zach Johnson	70-74-68=212	+2

=== Final round ===
Sunday, September 20, 2020

==== Summary ====
Starting the final round two strokes behind, Bryson DeChambeau took the lead on the fifth hole as overnight leader Matthew Wolff made his second bogey of the day. At the par-5 9th hole, both players were on the green in two strokes; after DeChambeau had made a 39-foot putt for an eagle, Wolff was able to match it by holing his putt from ten feet to remain just a stroke behind going into the last nine holes.

At the par-3 10th hole Wolff hit his tee shot into thick rough lining a greenside bunker and was unable to get up and down. DeChambeau then increased his lead to three strokes at the next hole, the par-4 11th, by holing his birdie putt from just off the green. Wolff fell six strokes behind after making another bogey at the 14th hole followed by a double-bogey at the 16th, as DeChambeau recorded a run of pars. Two more pars for DeChambeau, including a seven-foot putt on the 18th, gave him a six-stroke victory.

DeChambeau's three-under-par round of 67 was the best of the day by three shots. He was the only player not to shoot over par in any round, despite hitting just 23 of 56 fairways for the week, the fewest by a U.S. Open champion since at least 1981. He also joined Jack Nicklaus and Tiger Woods as the only players to win the U.S. Amateur, an NCAA title, and the U.S. Open. It was Wolff's second top-5 finish in just his second major championship.

In third place was Louis Oosthuizen at two over par. Harris English was a stroke further back in fourth place, his best finish and first top-ten in a major championship. Xander Schauffele extended his run of finishing in the top 10 of each U.S. Open he has played, securing fifth place on his own with a birdie on the 18th hole. World number one Dustin Johnson finished at five over par alongside Korn Ferry Tour qualifier Will Zalatoris in sixth place. Tied for eighth place at six over par were Tony Finau and four former major winners: Zach Johnson, Justin Thomas, Webb Simpson, and Rory McIlroy, whose challenge effectively ended with a four-putt double-bogey on the first hole and two further bogeys on the opening holes.

==== Final leaderboard ====
Champion
Silver Cup winner (leading amateur)
(a) = amateur
(c) = past champion

Place	Player	Score	To par	Money ($)
1	(United States) Bryson DeChambeau	69-68-70-67=274	−6	2,250,000
2	(United States) Matthew Wolff	66-74-65-75=280	E	1,350,000
3	(South Africa) Louis Oosthuizen	67-74-68-73=282	+2	861,457
4	(United States) Harris English	68-70-72-73=283	+3	603,903
5	(United States) Xander Schauffele	68-72-70-74=284	+4	502,993
T6	(United States) Dustin Johnson (c)	73-70-72-70=285	+5	424,040
T6	(United States) Will Zalatoris	70-74-70-71=285	+5	424,040
T8	(United States) Tony Finau	69-73-73-71=286	+6	302,236
T8	(United States) Zach Johnson	70-74-68-74=286	+6	302,236
T8	(Northern Ireland) Rory McIlroy (c)	67-76-68-75=286	+6	302,236
T8	(United States) Webb Simpson (c)	71-71-71-73=286	+6	302,236
T8	(United States) Justin Thomas	65-73-76-72=286	+6	302,236

Leaderboard below the top 10
Place	Player	Score	To par	Money ($)
T13	(Norway) Viktor Hovland	71-71-70-75=287	+7	210,757
T13	(United States) Adam Long	71-74-69-73=287	+7	210,757
T13	(United States) Patrick Reed	66-70-77-74=287	+7	210,757
T13	(England) Lee Westwood	67-76-72-72=287	+7	210,757
T17	(England) Paul Casey	76-70-69-73=288	+8	157,931
T17	(United States) Lucas Glover (c)	71-71-71-75=288	+8	157,931
T17	(United States) Jason Kokrak	68-71-77-72=288	+8	157,931
T17	(Japan) Hideki Matsuyama	71-69-70-78=288	+8	157,931
T17	(Sweden) Alex Norén	72-74-67-75=288	+8	157,931
22	(South Korea) Im Sung-jae	70-75-73-71=289	+9	129,407
T23	(Spain) Rafa Cabrera-Bello	68-70-74-78=290	+10	101,797
T23	(Chile) Joaquín Niemann	68-73-72-77=290	+10	101,797
T23	(Canada) Taylor Pendrith	71-74-75-70=290	+10	101,797
T23	(Belgium) Thomas Pieters	66-74-73-77=290	+10	101,797
T23	(Spain) Jon Rahm	69-72-76-73=290	+10	101,797
T23	(United States) Brendon Todd	68-72-75-75=290	+10	101,797
T23	(South Africa) Erik van Rooyen	70-74-76-70=290	+10	101,797
30	(United States) Charles Howell III	73-72-72-74=291	+11	83,422
T31	(Australia) Lucas Herbert	72-74-74-72=292	+12	75,649
T31	(Italy) Renato Paratore	71-72-73-76=292	+12	75,649
T31	(United States) Bubba Watson	72-69-74-77=292	+12	75,649
T34	(United States) Daniel Berger	73-70-74-76=293	+13	64,024
T34	(United States) Tyler Duncan	73-71-77-72=293	+13	64,024
T34	(Germany) Stephan Jäger	71-70-79-73=293	+13	64,024
T34	(France) Romain Langasque	71-74-75-73=293	+13	64,024
T38	(Australia) Jason Day	72-74-76-72=294	+14	52,074
T38	(United States) Brian Harman	74-72-75-73=294	+14	52,074
T38	(United States) Billy Horschel	72-70-72-80=294	+14	52,074
T38	(Australia) Adam Scott	71-74-74-75=294	+14	52,074
T38	(Australia) Cameron Smith	71-73-78-72=294	+14	52,074
T43	(United States) Patrick Cantlay	70-76-76-73=295	+15	39,275
T43	(United States) Lanto Griffin	71-74-71-79=295	+15	39,275
T43	(Republic of Ireland) Shane Lowry	76-70-77-72=295	+15	39,275
T43	(England) Matt Wallace	70-75-73-77=295	+15	39,275
T43	(Austria) Bernd Wiesberger	73-72-76-74=295	+15	39,275
48	(United States) Michael Thompson	70-75-75-76=296	+16	38,254
T49	(Belgium) Thomas Detry	71-72-73-81=297	+17	30,312
T49	(United States) Rickie Fowler	69-77-72-79=297	+17	30,312
T51	(United States) Chesson Hadley	73-73-77-75=298	+18	28,563
T51	(Japan) Ryo Ishikawa	72-74-74-78=298	+18	28,563
T51	(United States) John Pak (a)	69-76-79-74=298	+18	0
54	(Canada) Adam Hadwin	72-73-74-80=299	+19	27,720
55	(South Africa) Christiaan Bezuidenhout	70-76-72-82=300	+20	27,461
T56	(Mexico) Abraham Ancer	71-75-79-76=301	+21	27,073
T56	(Scotland) Robert MacIntyre	74-72-76-79=301	+21	27,073
58	(United States) Troy Merritt	72-74-78-78=302	+22	26,684
T59	(Colombia) Sebastián Muñoz	71-74-77-82=304	+24	26,296
T59	(Slovakia) Rory Sabbatini	69-76-78-81=304	+24	26,296
61	(Japan) Shugo Imahira	71-74-78-82=305	+25	25,901
WD	(New Zealand) Danny Lee	70-75-78=223	+13	
CUT	(South Korea) An Byeong-hun	71-76=147	+7	
CUT	(Canada) Corey Conners	71-76=147	+7	
CUT	(United States) Joel Dahmen	73-74=147	+7	
CUT	(England) Matt Fitzpatrick	74-73=147	+7	
CUT	(Japan) Takumi Kanaya (a)	72-75=147	+7	
CUT	(Germany) Martin Kaymer (c)	71-76=147	+7	
CUT	(United States) Chan Kim	71-76=147	+7	
CUT	(United States) Kurt Kitayama	70-77=147	+7	
CUT	(United States) Collin Morikawa	76-71=147	+7	
CUT	(United States) Davis Thompson (a)	69-78=147	+7	
CUT	(France) Paul Barjon	77-71=148	+8	
CUT	(United States) Keegan Bradley	75-73=148	+8	
CUT	(England) Tommy Fleetwood	74-74=148	+8	
CUT	(Canada) Mackenzie Hughes	72-76=148	+8	
CUT	(South Africa) Shaun Norris	69-79=148	+8	
CUT	(United States) Andy Ogletree (a)	71-77=148	+8	
CUT	(United States) Ryan Palmer	73-75=148	+8	
CUT	(United States) Kevin Streelman	73-75=148	+8	
CUT	(England) Andy Sullivan	71-77=148	+8	
CUT	(United States) Gary Woodland (c)	74-74=148	+8	
CUT	(United States) John Augenstein (a)	74-75=149	+9	
CUT	(South Korea) Kim Si-woo	72-77=149	+9	
CUT	(United States) Matt Kuchar	74-75=149	+9	
CUT	(Scotland) Sandy Scott (a)	75-74=149	+9	
CUT	(United States) Preston Summerhays (a)	72-77=149	+9	
CUT	(England) Paul Waring	72-77=149	+9	
CUT	(United States) Danny Balin	73-77=150	+10	
CUT	(United States) Jim Herman	73-77=150	+10	
CUT	(Thailand) Jazz Janewattananond	73-77=150	+10	
CUT	(Australia) Matt Jones	76-74=150	+10	
CUT	(France) Mike Lorenzo-Vera	73-77=150	+10	
CUT	(Spain) Adrián Otaegui	71-79=150	+10	
CUT	(France) Victor Perez	76-74=150	+10	
CUT	(England) Justin Rose (c)	73-77=150	+10	
CUT	(Scotland) Connor Syme	75-75=150	+10	
CUT	(United States) Jimmy Walker	72-78=150	+10	
CUT	(England) Danny Willett	77-73=150	+10	
CUT	(United States) Tiger Woods (c)	73-77=150	+10	
CUT	(United States) Brandon Wu	74-76=150	+10	
CUT	(Taiwan) Kevin Yu (a)	70-80=150	+10	
CUT	(United States) Cameron Champ	73-78=151	+11	
CUT	(United States) Cole Hammer (a)	77-74=151	+11	
CUT	(Australia) Marc Leishman	73-78=151	+11	
CUT	(England) Tom Lewis	74-77=151	+11	
CUT	(Australia) Curtis Luck	75-76=151	+11	
CUT	(United States) Chez Reavie	75-76=151	+11	
CUT	(Sweden) Henrik Stenson	74-77=151	+11	
CUT	(United States) Steve Stricker	74-77=151	+11	
CUT	(United States) Ricky Castillo (a)	73-79=152	+12	
CUT	(England) Tyrrell Hatton	74-78=152	+12	
CUT	(United States) Kevin Kisner	76-76=152	+12	
CUT	(United States) Kevin Na	75-77=152	+12	
CUT	(England) Ian Poulter	75-77=152	+12	
CUT	(South Africa) J. C. Ritchie	74-78=152	+12	
CUT	(United States) Brandt Snedeker	75-77=152	+12	
CUT	(United States) Richy Werenski	73-79=152	+12	
CUT	(South Africa) Justin Harding	77-76=153	+13	
CUT	(United States) Lee Hodges	76-77=153	+13	
CUT	(United States) Dan McCarthy	76-77=153	+13	
CUT	(United States) Phil Mickelson	79-74=153	+13	
CUT	(United States) J. T. Poston	71-82=153	+13	
CUT	(South Africa) Branden Grace	75-79=154	+14	
CUT	(Denmark) Rasmus Højgaard	77-77=154	+14	
CUT	(United States) Max Homa	78-76=154	+14	
CUT	(United States) Mark Hubbard	76-78=154	+14	
CUT	(England) Eddie Pepperell	78-76=154	+14	
CUT	(United States) Davis Riley	79-75=154	+14	
CUT	(Austria) Matthias Schwab	77-77=154	+14	
CUT	(United States) Jordan Spieth (c)	73-81=154	+14	
CUT	(Finland) Sami Välimäki	78-76=154	+14	
CUT	(Spain) Sergio García	74-81=155	+15	
CUT	(United States) Ryan Vermeer	78-77=155	+15	
CUT	(Northern Ireland) Graeme McDowell (c)	76-80=156	+16	
CUT	(United States) Marty Jertson	76-81=157	+17	
CUT	(Australia) Lukas Michel (a)	80-77=157	+17	
CUT	(Republic of Ireland) James Sugrue (a)	78-79=157	+17	
CUT	(Australia) Scott Hend	74-84=158	+18	
CUT	(New Zealand) Ryan Fox	74-85=159	+19	
CUT	(South Korea) Kang Sung-hoon	74-86=160	+20	
CUT	(United States) Greyson Sigg	75-85=160	+20	
CUT	(Spain) Eduard Rousaud (a)	76-85=161	+21	
WD	(United States) Andrew Putnam	73	+3	

==== Scorecard ====
Hole	1	2	3	4	5	6	7	8	9	10	11	12	13	14	15	16	17	18
Par	4	4	3	4	4	4	3	4	5	3	4	5	3	4	4	4	4	4
(United States) DeChambeau	−3	−3	−3	−4	−4	−4	−4	−3	−5	−5	−6	−6	−6	−6	−6	−6	−6	−6
(United States) Wolff	−5	−5	−4	−4	−3	−3	−3	−2	−4	−3	−3	−3	−3	−2	−2	E	E	E
(South Africa) Oosthuizen	−1	−1	−1	E	E	−1	−1	E	E	+1	+1	+1	+1	+1	+2	+2	+3	+2
(United States) English	+2	+1	+1	+1	+1	+2	+2	+2	+1	+1	E	E	+1	+1	+2	+2	+2	+3
(United States) Schauffele	E	E	E	+1	+2	+2	+2	+1	E	E	E	E	+1	+2	+3	+4	+5	+4
(United States) D. Johnson	+5	+6	+7	+7	+7	+7	+7	+7	+5	+5	+5	+5	+5	+5	+6	+5	+5	+5
(United States) Zalatoris	+4	+4	+5	+5	+6	+5	+4	+5	+5	+5	+4	+4	+4	+4	+4	+4	+5	+5
(Northern Ireland) McIlroy	+3	+3	+3	+4	+4	+4	+5	+5	+4	+4	+3	+3	+3	+3	+4	+6	+6	+6
(Japan) Matsuyama	+2	+3	+4	+5	+5	+4	+4	+5	+5	+5	+5	+5	+6	+7	+7	+8	+8	+8

Cumulative tournament scores, relative to par

Eagle	Birdie	Bogey	Double bogey

== Media ==
On June 29, 2020, it was announced that Fox Sports had opted out of the remaining seven years of its 12-year contract to carry USGA championships and had sold the remainder of the contract to NBCUniversal—marking the return of the U.S. Open to NBC for the first time since 2014. The rescheduling of the tournament had created conflicts with Fox's NFL and college football coverage, and the USGA declined a proposal for the entirety of the tournament to be carried on Fox's cable channel FS1 instead. Fox discussed the possibility of partnering with NBC on the 2020 tournament, but this eventually "led to a broader conversation and eventual agreement for NBCUniversal to take over the USGA media rights".

Early-round coverage aired on Golf Channel; Peacock carried featured groups coverage of the early rounds. Per a sponsorship agreement with Rolex, the final hour of coverage during the final round was broadcast with no commercial interruptions.

The 2020 edition of the U.S. Open featured a total of 43.5 hours of coverage, made up of 11.5 hours on each of Thursday and Friday, 10.5 hours on Saturday, and 10 hours on Sunday. Golf Channel carried a total of 15 hours of coverage: 6.5 hours on each of Thursday and Friday and 2 hours on Sunday; NBC had a total of 20.5 hours of coverage: 3 hours on each of Thursday and Friday, 8.5 hours on Saturday, and 6 hours on Sunday; Peacock streamed 2 hours of coverage each day.
