= 2019 Walker Cup =

Golf tournament

Coordinates: 53.387°N 3.186°W

47th Walker Cup Match
- Dates: 7–8 September 2019
- Venue: Royal Liverpool Golf Club
- Location: Hoylake, Merseyside, England
- Captains: Craig Watson (GB&I); Nathaniel Crosby (USA)
| (United Kingdom) (Republic of Ireland) | 10½ | 15½ | (United States) |
- United States wins the Walker Cup

The 47th Walker Cup Match was played 7 and 8 September 2019 at Royal Liverpool Golf Club, Hoylake, Merseyside, England. Royal Liverpool hosted the 1983 Walker Cup. The United States won by 15½ points to 10½. They trailed 7½ to 8½ coming in to the final day singles but won 8 of the 10 matches to win convincingly.

== Format ==
On Saturday, there were four matches of foursomes in the morning and eight singles matches in the afternoon. On Sunday, there were four matches of foursomes in the morning, followed by ten singles matches (involving every player) in the afternoon. In all, 26 matches were played.

Each of the 26 matches was worth one point in the larger team competition. If a match was all square after the 18th hole extra holes were not played. Rather, each side earned ½ a point toward their team total. The team that accumulated at least 13½ points won the competition. In the event of a tie, the previous winner would retain the Cup.

== Teams ==
Ten players for the United States and Great Britain & Ireland played in the event with each team having a non-playing captain. The two teams were announced following the U.S. Amateur.

Craig Watson was the captain of the Great Britain & Ireland team, while Nathaniel Crosby captained the United States team.

& Great Britain & Ireland
| Name | Rank | Age | Notes |
| (Scotland) Craig Watson | | 53 | non-playing captain |
| (England) Alex Fitzpatrick | 41 | 20 |
| (England) Conor Gough | 2 | 16 |
| (England) Harry Hall | 76 | 21 |
| (England) Thomas Plumb | 138 | 20 |
| (Republic of Ireland) Conor Purcell | 16 | 21 |
| (Republic of Ireland) Caolan Rafferty | 23 | 26 |
| (Scotland) Sandy Scott | 51 | 20 |
| (England) Tom Sloman | 35 | 22 |
| (Republic of Ireland) James Sugrue | 62 | 22 |
| (Scotland) Euan Walker | 14 | 24 |

Note: "Rank" is the World Amateur Golf Ranking.

=== U.S. team ===
The first three members of the team were selected in July 2019 as the leading three Americans in the World Amateur Golf Ranking. They were Texas sophomore Cole Hammer, high school senior Akshay Bhatia and mid-amateur Stewart Hagestad. The final members of the team were announced on 18 August 2019. With his victory in the U.S. Amateur at Pinehurst Resort, Georgia Tech senior Andy Ogletree earned an automatic place in the team. John Augenstein, who lost to Ogletree in the U.S. Amateur final was also chosen. Also selected were one current college golfer, John Pak of Florida State, and four recent graduates: Steven Fisk (Georgia Southern), Alex Smalley (Duke), Isaiah Salinda (Stanford), and Brandon Wu (Stanford). The USGA named two alternates for the team: Chandler Phillips and Ricky Castillo.

USA
| Name | Rank | Age | Notes |
| Nathaniel Crosby | | 57 | non-playing captain |
| John Augenstein | 38 | 21 |
| Akshay Bhatia | 5 | 17 |
| Steven Fisk | 12 | 22 |
| Stewart Hagestad | 7 | 28 | Played in 2017 Walker Cup |
| Cole Hammer | 1 | 19 |
| Andy Ogletree | 120 | 21 |
| John Pak | 25 | 20 |
| Isaiah Salinda | 20 | 22 |
| Alex Smalley | 18 | 22 |
| Brandon Wu | 11 | 22 |

Note: "Rank" is the World Amateur Golf Ranking.

== Saturday's matches ==
=== Morning foursomes ===
| & | Results |
|---|---|---|
| Fitzpatrick/Purcell | (United Kingdom) (Republic of Ireland) 2 & 1 | Augenstein/Ogletree |
| Scott/Walker | (United States) 2 & 1 | Pak/Salinda |
| Hall/Gough | (United Kingdom) (Republic of Ireland) 2 & 1 | Hagestad/Bhatia |
| Sloman/Plumb | (United States) 2 & 1 | Wu/Smalley |
| 2 | Foursomes | 2 |
| 2 | Overall | 2 |

=== Afternoon singles ===
| & | Results |
|---|---|---|
| Alex Fitzpatrick | (United Kingdom) (Republic of Ireland) 2 up | Cole Hammer |
| Euan Walker | (United Kingdom) (Republic of Ireland) 2 up | Steven Fisk |
| Sandy Scott | (United Kingdom) (Republic of Ireland) 1 up | Andy Ogletree |
| Conor Purcell | (United States) 2 & 1 | John Augenstein |
| James Sugrue | (United States) 1 up | John Pak |
| Conor Gough | (United Kingdom) (Republic of Ireland) 2 up | Isaiah Salinda |
| Caolan Rafferty | (United Kingdom) (Republic of Ireland) 2 & 1 | Alex Smalley |
| Tom Sloman | (United States) 4 & 2 | Brandon Wu |
| 5 | Singles | 3 |
| 7 | Overall | 5 |

== Sunday's matches ==
=== Morning foursomes ===
| & | Results |
|---|---|---|
| Fitzpatrick/Purcell | (United States) 2 & 1 | Wu/Smalley |
| Walker/Scott | halved | Ogletree/Augenstein |
| Hall/Gough | (United States) 3 & 2 | Hagestad/Bhatia |
| Sloman/Plumb | (United Kingdom) (Republic of Ireland) 5 & 3 | Hammer/Fisk |
| 1½ | Foursomes | 2½ |
| 8½ | Overall | 7½ |

=== Afternoon singles ===
| & | Results |
|---|---|---|
| Alex Fitzpatrick | (United States) 2 up | Isaiah Salinda |
| Euan Walker | (United States) 2 & 1 | John Pak |
| Sandy Scott | (United Kingdom) (Republic of Ireland) 4 & 3 | Brandon Wu |
| Caolan Rafferty | (United States) 2 & 1 | Alex Smalley |
| Harry Hall | (United States) 5 & 3 | Stewart Hagestad |
| Conor Gough | (United States) 2 & 1 | Andy Ogletree |
| Thomas Plumb | (United States) 4 & 3 | John Augenstein |
| James Sugrue | (United States) 4 & 2 | Akshay Bhatia |
| Conor Purcell | (United States) 6 & 5 | Cole Hammer |
| Tom Sloman | (United Kingdom) (Republic of Ireland) 2 up | Steven Fisk |
| 2 | Singles | 8 |
| 10½ | Overall | 15½ |
