= Alex Fitzpatrick =

English professional golfer (born 1999)

Personal information
- Nationality: England
- Born: 2 January 1999 (age 27) Sheffield, South Yorkshire, England

Career
- Sport: Golf
- College: Wake Forest University
- Turned professional: 2022
- Current tours: PGA Tour; European Tour
- Former tours: Challenge Tour; PGA Tour Canada
- Professional wins: 3
- Highest ranking: 56 (13 September 2026) (as of 25 October 2026)

Number of wins by tour
- PGA Tour: 1
- European Tour: 1
- Challenge Tour: 1

Best results in major championships
- Masters Tournament: DNP
- PGA Championship: T75: 2026
- U.S. Open: T23: 2026
- The Open Championship: T17: 2023

Alex Fitzpatrick (born 2 January 1999) is an English professional golfer who currently plays on the PGA Tour and the European Tour. He is also the younger brother of Matt Fitzpatrick.

== Amateur career ==
In 2018, Fitzpatrick reached the final of the Spanish International Amateur Championship at La Manga, losing 3 and 2 to fellow countryman Billy McKenzie. The same year Fitzpatrick reached the quarterfinals of the 2018 U.S. Amateur.

Fitzpatrick played college golf from 2018 to 2022 at Wake Forest University in North Carolina. He made his PGA Tour debut as an amateur at the 2022 Valspar Championship at Innisbrook Resort, Palm Harbor, Florida, being invited after winning the 2021 Valspar Collegiate.

He represented England at the 2019 European Amateur Team Championship at Ljunghusen Golf Club in Sweden, finishing tied 4th individually in the stroke-play competition and earning a silver medal with his team since they lost in the final against host nation Sweden. He also played in the 2019 and 2021 Walker Cup. His best ranking on the World Amateur Golf Ranking was 4th.

== Professional career ==
Fitzpatrick turned professional in June 2022 and became an affiliate member of the European Tour. He made his professional debut at the 2022 Horizon Irish Open.

In August 2022, Fitzpatrick played five tournaments on the PGA Tour Canada, with a best finish of tied 11th at the Ontario Open.

He made the cut in his next four tournaments on the European Tour, earning a total of €129,014, with a best finish of tied 13th at the 2022 Cazoo Open de France in September.

Fitzpatrick qualified for the 2023 Open Championship at Royal Liverpool. He entered his first major championship, via the qualifying competition held at West Lancashire prior. After the third round he shared 9th place. He eventually finished tied 17th, four strokes better than his brother Matt Fitzpatrick, who finished tied 41st. Fitzpatrick's third round of 65 tied the previous lowest round at an Open Championship at Royal Liverpool.

In August 2023, Fitzpatrick claimed his first professional victory at the British Challenge on the Challenge Tour. He shot a final-round 68 to win by five shots.

Later in the same month, Fitzpatrick finished second at a European Tour event, the ISPS Handa World Invitational, played at Galgorm Castle in the Northern Ireland.

In March 2026, Fitzpatrick overcame a six-shot deficit to win the Hero Indian Open for his first European Tour victory.

The following month, Fitzpatrick teamed up with his brother Matt at the Zurich Classic of New Orleans on the PGA Tour. The pair shot 31-under-par, including a Saturday 57 in the four-ball format, to win the tournament by one stroke. This was Fitzpatrick's first win on the PGA Tour, which earned him a two-year PGA Tour exemption through 2028.

== Amateur wins ==
- 2017 Yorkshire Amateur Match Play Championship
- 2020 Golf Club of Georgia Amateur Championship
- 2021 Valspar Collegiate, Old Town Club Collegiate

== Professional wins (3) ==
=== PGA Tour wins (1) ===
No.	Date	Tournament	Winning score	Margin of victory	Runners-up
1	26 Apr 2026	Zurich Classic of New Orleans (with (England) Matt Fitzpatrick)	−31 (64-65-57-71=258)	1 stroke	(Norway) Kristoffer Reitan and (Norway) Kristoffer Ventura, (United States) Alex Smalley and (United States) Hayden Springer

=== European Tour wins (1) ===
No.	Date	Tournament	Winning score	Margin of victory	Runner-up
1	29 Mar 2026	Hero Indian Open^{1}	−9 (70-68-72-69=279)	2 strokes	(Spain) Eugenio Chacarra

^{1}Co-sanctioned by the Professional Golf Tour of India

=== Challenge Tour wins (1) ===
No.	Date	Tournament	Winning score	Margin of victory	Runners-up
1	6 Aug 2023	British Challenge	−12 (72-66-70-68=276)	5 strokes	(Wales) Stuart Manley, (England) Ross McGowan, (France) Tom Vaillant

== Results in major championships ==
Tournament	2023	2024	2025	2026
Masters Tournament				
PGA Championship				T75
U.S. Open				T23
The Open Championship	T17			T71

Did not play

"T" = tied

== Team appearances ==
Amateur

- Boys Home Internationals (representing England): 2016, 2017 (winners)
- Jacques Léglise Trophy (representing Great Britain & Ireland): 2016, 2017
- European Amateur Team Championship (representing England): 2019
- Walker Cup (representing Great Britain & Ireland): 2019, 2021
- Arnold Palmer Cup (representing International team): 2020 (winners), 2021
