= 2020 U.S. Open =

2020 U.S. Open may refer to:

- 2020 U.S. Open (golf), a major golf tournament
- 2020 US Open (tennis), a grand slam tennis event
- 2020 U.S. Open Cup, a planned soccer tournament not held due to the COVID-19 pandemic
