= Mitsuki Katahira =

Japanese professional golfer

Personal information
- Nickname: Mickey
- Nationality: Japan
- Born: 4 September 1989 (age 37) Kanagawa Prefecture, Japan

Career
- Sport: Golf
- College: Daytona State College
- Turned professional: 2011
- Former tours: LPGA Tour; Symetra Tour

Mitsuki Katahira (片平 光紀, Katahira Mitsuki; born 4 September 1989) is a retired Japanese professional golfer. In 2011, she was world No. 1 in the inaugural World Amateur Golf Ranking.

== Amateur career ==
Katahira was born in 1989 in the Greater Tokyo Area, Japan. After graduating from junior high school, she moved to Hilton Head, South Carolina, to attend the International Junior Golf Academy. When she arrived, she couldn't speak English, a situation she shared with classmate I. K. Kim. In 2007, she won The Memorial Junior, an AJGA event.

Katahira played NJCAA college golf at Daytona State College. In 2010, she took first place at the NJCAA Women's Golf Championship, scoring 211 (−5) for the tournament, the lowest three-round score in NJCAA tournament history. She also set an individual record by shooting a 64 on day two, the lowest single round score by an individual.

In 2011, she defended her NJCAA Women's Golf Championship title. In nine starts, she won six times and was runner-up in her other three starts, recording a 70.92 stroke average.

== Professional career ==
Katahira turned professional in 2011 and tied for 31st at the LPGA Final Qualifying Tournament to earn conditional status. Sharing her time between the LPGA Tour and the Symetra Tour, she lost a playoff at the 2013 Island Resort Championship in Michigan.

After only three seasons, a hand injury ended her career. She stayed in the United States and became a golf journalist and broadcaster for Golf Channel Japan and Golf Digest Japan.

== Amateur wins ==
- 2007 The Memorial Junior
- 2010 LPGA Xavier International, NJCAA Women's National Championship
- 2011 JU Women's Classic, Kiawah Island Intercollegiate, John Kirk/Panther Intercollegiate, World Golf Village Intercollegiate, NJCAA Women's National Championship, Florida Stroke Play

== Playoff record ==
Symetra Tour playoff record (0–1)

No.	Year	Tournament	Opponent	Result
1	2013	Island Resort Championship	(United States) Kim Kaufman	Kaufman won with par on first extra hole
