= 2019 Arnold Palmer Cup =

Team golf competition in the United States

- Dates: June 7–9, 2019
- Venue: Alotian Golf Club
- Location: Roland, Arkansas
USA	26½	33½	International
- International team wins the Arnold Palmer Cup

The 2019 Arnold Palmer Cup was a team golf competition held from June 7–9, 2019 at Alotian Golf Club, Roland, Arkansas. It was the 23rd time the event had been contested and the second under the new format in which women golfers played in addition to men and an international team, representing the rest of the world, replaced the European team. The international team won the match 33½–26½.

== Format ==
The contest was played over three days. On Friday, there were 12 mixed four-ball matches. On Saturday there were 12 mixed foursomes matches in the morning and 12 fourball matches in the afternoon, six all-women matches and six all-men matches. 24 singles matches were played on Sunday. In all, 60 matches were played.

Each of the 60 matches was worth one point in the larger team competition. If a match was all square after the 18th hole, each side earned half a point toward their team total. The team that accumulated at least 30½ points won the competition.

== Teams ==
United States
Name	College	Qualification method
Therese Hession	non-playing head coach	
Ryan Hybl	non-playing head coach	
Ryan Blagg	non-playing assistant coach	
Susan Rosenstiel	non-playing assistant coach	
Women
Kaylee Benton	Arkansas	Coach's pick
Abbey Carlson	Vanderbilt	Committee selection
Jennifer Chang	Southern California	Arnold Palmer Cup Ranking
Hailee Cooper	Texas	Committee selection
Mariel Galdiano	UCLA	Arnold Palmer Cup Ranking
Haylee Harford	Furman	Arnold Palmer Cup Ranking
Dylan Kim	Arkansas	Arnold Palmer Cup Ranking
Stephanie Lau	Northwestern	Committee selection
Emilia Migliaccio	Wake Forest	Committee selection
Malia Nam	Southern California	Arnold Palmer Cup Ranking
Kaitlyn Papp	Texas	Arnold Palmer Cup Ranking
Ann Parmerter	DBU	Committee selection
Men
John Augenstein	Vanderbilt	Committee selection
Quade Cummins	Oklahoma	Committee selection
Austin Eckroat	Oklahoma State	Committee selection
Will Gordon	Vanderbilt	Arnold Palmer Cup Ranking
Will Grimmer	Ohio State	Arnold Palmer Cup Ranking
Cole Hammer	Texas	Arnold Palmer Cup Ranking
Peter Kuest	BYU	Arnold Palmer Cup Ranking
Patrick Martin	Vanderbilt	Coach's pick
Chandler Phillips	Texas A&M	Committee selection
Alex Scott	Grand Valley State	Committee selection
Alex Smalley	Duke	Arnold Palmer Cup Ranking
Brandon Wu	Stanford	Arnold Palmer Cup Ranking

International
Name	Country	College	Qualification method
Mark Immelman	South Africa	non-playing head coach	
Jan Dowling	Canada	non-playing head coach	
Robert Duck	England	non-playing assistant coach	
Ria Quiazon Scott	Philippines	non-playing assistant coach	
Women
Ana Belac	Slovenia	Duke	Committee selection
Sofia Garcia	Paraguay	Texas Tech	Coach's pick
Lois Kaye Go	Philippines	South Carolina	Committee selection
Leonie Harm	Germany	Houston	Committee selection
Jeon Ji-won	South Korea	Alabama	Arnold Palmer Cup Ranking
Frida Kinhult	Sweden	Florida State	Arnold Palmer Cup Ranking
Agathe Laisné	France	Texas	Committee selection
Julie McCarthy	Ireland	Auburn	Arnold Palmer Cup Ranking
Lorna McClymont	Scotland	SRUC Elmwood	R&A Foundation Scholars Tournament
Hira Naveed	Australia	Pepperdine	Arnold Palmer Cup Ranking
Gabriela Ruffels	Australia	Southern California	Replacement for Albane Valenzuela
Karoline Stormo	Norway	Kent State	Replacement for Patty Tavatanakit
Men
Kengo Aoshima	Japan	Wake Forest	Arnold Palmer Cup Ranking
Alejandro del Rey	Spain	Arizona State	Committee selection
Luis Gagne	Costa Rica	LSU	Committee selection
Aled Greville	Wales	Birmingham University	R&A Foundation Scholars Tournament
Takumi Kanaya	Japan	Tohoku Fukushi	Committee selection
Keita Nakajima	Japan	Nippon Sport Science	Coach's pick
David Nyfjäll	Sweden	Northwestern	Replacement for Jovan Rebula
Peng Pichaikool	Thailand	Mississippi State	Arnold Palmer Cup Ranking
Iván Ramírez	Colombia	Texas Tech	Arnold Palmer Cup Ranking
Matti Schmid	Germany	Louisville	Arnold Palmer Cup Ranking
Sandy Scott	Scotland	Texas Tech	Arnold Palmer Cup Ranking
Kevin Yu	Taiwan	Arizona State	Arnold Palmer Cup Ranking

== Friday's mixed fourball matches ==
Match	International	Results	United States
1	Kinhult/Nyfjäll	4 & 3	Galdiano/Phillips
2	Greville/McClymont	4 & 2	Augenstein/Migliaccio
3	McCarthy/Scott	3 & 2	Benton/Martin
4	Aoshima/Ruffels	halved	Lau/Scott
5	Laisné/Yu	1 up	Eckroat/Nam
6	Belac/Gagne	4 & 3	Cummins/Parmerter
7	del Rey/Stomo	halved	Carlson/Gordon
8	Go/Pichaikool	1 up	Grimmer/Harford
9	Garcia/Ramírez	3 & 1	Kuest/Papp
10	Harm/Schmid	4 & 3	Chang/Smalley
11	Kanaya/Naveed	1 up	Kim/Wu
12	Jeon/Nakajima	2 & 1	Cooper/Hammer
	4	Session	8
	4	Overall	8

== Saturday's matches ==
=== Morning mixed foursomes matches ===
Match	Tee	International	Results	United States
13	1	McCarthy/Scott	6 & 5	Galdiano/Phillips
14	1	Kinhult/Nyfjäll	3 & 2	Augenstein/Migliaccio
15	1	Kanaya/Naveed	1 up	Grimmer/Harford
16	1	Garcia/Ramírez	1 up	Scott/Carlson
17	1	del Rey/Harm	2 up	Martin/Parmerter
18	1	Go/Pichaikool	2 & 1	Cooper/Hammer
19	10	Laisné/Yu	4 & 3	Kuest/Lau
20	10	Belac/Gagne	3 & 2	Gordon/Kim
21	10	Jeon/Nakajima	3 & 1	Cummins/Papp
22	10	Aoshima/Ruffels	3 & 1	Smalley/Benton
23	10	Schmid/Stormo	halved	Eckroat/Nam
24	10	Greville/McClymont	7 & 5	Wu/Chang
		8½	Session	3½
		12½	Overall	11½

=== Afternoon fourball matches ===
Match	Tee	International	Results	United States
25	1	Kinhult/Laisné	3 & 1	Carlson/Migliaccio
26	1	Greville/Aoshima	1 up	Augenstein/Kuest
27	1	Jeon/Stormo	2 up	Papp/Parmerter
28	1	Schmid/Pichaikool	1 up	Phillips/Smalley
29	1	Harm/Ruffels	2 & 1	Chang/Galdiano
30	1	Nyfjäll/Scott	4 & 2	Gordon/Wu
31	10	del Rey/Ramírez	3 & 2	Cummins/Eckroat
32	10	Go/McClymont	2 & 1	Harford/Lau
33	10	Nakajima/Kanaya	5 & 3	Grimmer/Scott
34	10	McCarthy/Belac	halved	Kim/Benton
35	10	Gagne/Yu	4 & 3	Hammer/Martin
36	10	Garcia/Naveed	halved	Cooper/Nam
		8	Session	4
		20½	Overall	15½

== Sunday's singles matches ==
Match	Tee	International	Results	United States
37	1	Agathe Laisné	3 & 1	Jennifer Chang
38	10	Alex del Rey	3 & 2	Austin Eckroat
39	1	Peng Pichaikool	halved	Cole Hammer
40	10	Lorna McClymont	3 & 2	Stephanie Lau
41	1	Sofia Garcia	2 up	Abbey Carlson
42	10	Sandy Scott	halved	Will Grimmer
43	1	Chun An Yu	2 & 1	Will Gordon
44	10	Lois Kaye Go	1 up	Kaitlyn Papp
45	1	Karoline Stormo	5 & 4	Malia Nam
46	10	Matti Schmid	1 up	Peter Kuest
47	1	Takumi Kanaya	2 up	Alex Smalley
48	10	Hira Naveed	3 & 2	Ann Parmerter
49	1	Leonie Harm	halved	Emilia Migliaccio
50	10	Iván Ramírez	3 & 2	Brandon Wu
51	1	Aled Greville	6 & 5	Patrick Martin
52	10	Julie McCarthy	2 & 1	Hailee Cooper
53	1	Frida Kinhult	4 & 2	Dylan Kim
54	10	David Nyfjäll	3 & 1	Alex Scott
55	1	Kengo Aoshima	1 up	Quade Cummins
56	10	Gabriela Ruffels	2 & 1	Haylee Harford
57	1	Jeon Ji-won	5 & 4	Kaylee Benton
58	10	Keita Nakajima	3 & 2	Chandler Phillips
59	1	Luis Gagne	halved	John Augenstein
60	10	Ana Belac	6 & 4	Mariel Galdiano
		13	Session	11
		33½	Overall	26½

== Michael Carter award ==
The Michael Carter Award winners were Alex Scott and Leonie Harm.
