= Kim Kaufman =

American professional golfer

Personal information
- Nationality: United States
- Born: August 16, 1991 (age 35) Huron, South Dakota, U.S.
- Height: 6 ft 0 in (1.83 m)
- Spouse: Johan Wolkesson

Career
- Sport: Golf
- College: Texas Tech University
- Turned professional: 2013
- Current tour: Symetra Tour (joined 2013)
- Former tour: LPGA Tour (joined 2014)
- Professional wins: 3

Number of wins by tour
- Epson Tour: 3

Best results in LPGA major championships
- Chevron Championship: T66: 2018
- Women's PGA C'ship: T29: 2017
- U.S. Women's Open: T32: 2016
- Women's British Open: CUT: 2014, 2015, 2016, 2017
- Evian Championship: T29: 2015

Achievements and awards
- Golfweek Player of the Fall: 2012
- Texas Tech Female Athlete of the Year: 2013

Kim Kaufman (born August 16, 1991) is an American professional golfer and LPGA Tour player. She was runner-up at the 2015 Blue Bay LPGA.

== Early life, amateur and college career ==
Kaufman was born in Huron, South Dakota, and grew up in Clark, South Dakota, where she was a six-time South Dakota Golf Association Junior Champion, with a career-low round of 66. She was South Dakota state champion four times at Clark High School, and was an all-state selection all four years. She qualified three times for the U.S. Girls' Junior and advanced to the quarterfinals in 2009. She also played in the U.S. Women's Amateur three times and in two U.S. Women's Amateur Public Links championships.

Kaufman attended Texas Tech University between 2009 and 2013. In the fall of 2012, she ranked as the No. 1 golfer in the country according to Golfweek, and was named the Golfweek Player of the Fall.

== Professional career ==
Kaufman turned professional and joined the Symetra Tour in 2013. She made 10 cuts in 10 starts and won the Island Resort Championship after a playoff with Mitsuki Katahira of Japan.

She finished tied for 23rd at the LPGA Final Qualifying Tournament to earn membership for the 2014 LPGA Tour. In her rookie season, she was tied for 4th at the North Texas LPGA Shootout and tied for 5th at the Canadian Pacific Women's Open, and finished 58th on the money list. In 2015, she was runner-up at the Blue Bay LPGA and finished 45th on the money list.

In 2016, Kaufman crossed the $1 million mark in career earnings after her T7 finish at the Sime Darby LPGA Malaysia and rose to a high of 67th in the Women's World Golf Rankings.

After finishing 53rd on the money list in 2016 and 58th in 2017, her career took a hit when she was diagnosed with mononucleosis in Japan and fell down a flight of stairs and injured her wrist while recovering. She finished 123rd in 2018 and to keep her card for the 2019 season had to attend the inaugural LPGA Q-Series, where she tied for 11th.

In 2020, Kaufman found herself back on the Symetra Tour, where she won the Four Winds Invitational and finished third on the money list.

In 2026, she returned to her golfing career after a successful battle against cancer and other health related issues.

== Personal life ==
Kaufman is married to Sweden-born pro golfer Johan Wolkesson, who has caddied for her, including at the 2020 U.S. Women's Open.

== Amateur wins ==
- 2012 Landfall Tradition

== Professional wins (3) ==
=== Symetra Tour wins (3) ===
No.	Date	Tournament	Winning score	Margin of victory	Runner-up
1	Jun 30, 2013	Island Resort Championship	−3 (71-74-68=213)	Playoff	(Japan) Mitsuki Katahira
2	Mar 2, 2014	Volvik Championship	−7 (71-66=137) (Note: Tournament reduced to 36 holes due to adverse weather conditions)	4 strokes	(United States) Jennie Lee
3	Sep 6, 2020	Four Winds Invitational	−11 (67-69-69=205)	1 stroke	(Australia) Robyn Choi

Symetra Tour playoff record (1–0)

No.	Year	Tournament	Opponent	Result
1	2013	Island Resort Championship	(Japan) Mitsuki Katahira	Won with par on first extra hole

== Results in LPGA majors ==
Results not in chronological order.

Tournament	2014	2015	2016	2017	2018	2019	2020	2021	2022	2023	2024
ANA Inspiration		CUT	CUT	CUT	T66	CUT					
U.S. Women's Open		T35	T32	CUT	CUT		CUT	CUT			T58
Women's PGA Championship	CUT	CUT	CUT	T29	CUT	CUT	CUT				
The Evian Championship	CUT	T29	CUT	CUT			NT				
Women's British Open	CUT	CUT	CUT	CUT							

Did not play

CUT = missed the half-way cut
NT = no tournament
T = tied
