= Gabriela Ruffels =

Australian professional golfer (born 2000)

Personal information
- Nationality: Australia
- Born: 18 April 2000 (age 26) Orlando, Florida, U.S.
- Height: 5 ft 8 in (173 cm)

Career
- Sport: Golf
- College: University of Southern California
- Turned professional: 2021
- Current tour: LPGA Tour
- Former tour: Epson Tour
- Professional wins: 3

Number of wins by tour
- Epson Tour: 3

Best results in LPGA major championships
- Chevron Championship: T15: 2020
- Women's PGA C'ship: T24: 2023
- U.S. Women's Open: T13: 2020
- Women's British Open: CUT: 2020, 2024, 2025
- Evian Championship: T9: 2025

Achievements and awards
- Epson Tour Player of the Year: 2023

Gabriela Ruffels (born 18 April 2000) is an Australian American former tennis player and current professional golfer. Starting at the age of eight, Ruffels started playing tennis and won twenty one International Tennis Federation doubles events in Europe. She also was the number one ranking Australian junior when she was twelve. After switching from tennis to golf in 2015, Ruffels became the first ever Australian to win the U.S. Women's Amateur in 2019. She also was first at that year's North and South Women's Amateur.

In professional events, Ruffels was tied for 13th at the 2020 U.S. Women's Open and the 2020 Women's British Open. At the ANA Inspiration, Ruffels was tied for fifteenth in 2020 and tied for nineteenth in 2021. During the 2021 Women's PGA Championship, Ruffels finished the event in a tie for thirty-third place. Ruffels announced her decision to turn professional on February 10, 2021. On the Epson Tour, she won three events and received the Player of the Year Award.

== Early life and education ==
Ruffels was born on 18 April 2000, in Orlando, Florida. Her parents are former tennis players Anna-Maria Fernandez and Ray Ruffels. During her childhood, Ruffels lived in Laguna Niguel, California before moving to Melbourne, Australia. At the age of six, Ruffels began to play tennis and continued until she was fourteen.

Gabriela attended Haileybury in Melbourne for her secondary education from 2012 to 2017, and played in the Haileybury Girl's Premiership tennis teams in 2015 and 2017.

Her two years older brother Ryan also was a talented tennis player and became a successful golfer, representing Australia in the 2014 Eisenhower Trophy and turned professional in 2016.

For her post-secondary education, Ruffels enrolled at the University of Southern California in 2018 to study business administration. The following year, she was named All-American by the Women's Golf Coaches Association.

== Career ==
=== Tennis ===
As a tennis player, Ruffels won three doubles championships from 2011 to 2012. From 2013 to 2014, Ruffels primarily competed in ITF Grade 4 and Grade 5 events throughout Australia. In singles, her best finish was the quarterfinals at the 2014 Wilson Tennis Canterbury. For doubles, Ruffel's won the 2014 New South Wales Junior International. In other finals, Ruffels lost at the Wilson Tennis Canterbury and Auckland ITF Indoor Champs events in 2014.

In team events, Ruffels was part of the Australian team that finished fourth at the 2014 World Junior Tennis Finals. Overall, Ruffels was the number one ranking Australian junior when she was twelve years old and held the number three ranking two years later. She also had twenty one doubles event wins held by the ITF in Europe.

=== Amateur golf ===
At the beginning of 2015, Ruffels became tired of tennis and switched to golf. As an amateur golfer, she was ninth at the 2016 Australian Women's Amateur. In 2018, Ruffels joined the USC Trojans women's golf team. At the NCAA Division I Women's Golf Championships, Ruffels tied for tied for 19th in 2019 at the individual event. In the team events, Ruffels was part of the Southern California team that made it to the semifinals in 2018. Ruffels was also a member of the International team that won the 2019 Arnold Palmer Cup.

Ruffels appeared at the Canadian Women's Amateur, placing 21st at the 2019 event. That year, she won the North and South Women's Amateur. Ruffels also became the first ever Australian to win the U.S. Women's Amateur. With her U.S Amateur win, Ruffels received an exemption to the 2020 U.S. Women's Open. Additional 2020 events Ruffels received exemptions for were the ANA Inspiration, Evian Championship and Women's British Open. The following year, Ruffels was runner-up at the 2020 U.S Women's Amateur.

=== Professional golf ===
Ruffels missed the cut in the 2019 U.S. Women's Open. During 2020, Ruffels had a 13th place tie at the 2020 U.S. Women's Open and a 15th place tie at the 2020 ANA Inspiration. Outside of the United States, Ruffels had a 13th place tie at the 2020 Women's British Open.

In 2021, Ruffels became a professional golfer upon her debut at the Gainbridge LPGA at Boca Rio. Throughout the year, Ruffels primarily played on the LPGA Tour while also competing on the Symetra Tour and Ladies European Tour. Her highest finishes that season were fourth place at the IOA Championship and a tie for 17th place at the Hugel-Air Premia LA Open. She also tied for 19th place during the 2021 ANA Inspiration and tied for 33rd place during the 2021 Women's PGA Championship.

Her first professional win came at the 2023 Carlisle Arizona Women's Golf Classic on the Epson Tour.

Ruffles became the first Australian to win the Epson Tour Player of the Year Award in 2023, gaining her LPGA Tour card for the 2024 season.

== Awards and honours ==
Ruffels was named an All-American by the Women's Golf Coaches Association in 2019.

== Amateur wins ==
- 2018 Windy City Collegiate Championship
- 2019 North and South Women's Amateur, U.S. Women's Amateur
- 2020 Rebel Beach Intercollegiate

== Professional wins (3) ==
=== Epson Tour wins (3) ===
- 2023 Carlisle Arizona Women's Golf Classic, Garden City Charity Classic at Buffalo Dunes, Four Winds Invitational

== Results in LPGA majors ==
Results not in chronological order.

Tournament	2020	2021	2022	2023	2024	2025	2026
Chevron Championship	T15	T19	T25		T40	T44	CUT
U.S. Women's Open	T13		CUT	T33	T51	CUT	
Women's PGA Championship		T33		T24	T46	T36	CUT
The Evian Championship	NT				T55	T9	CUT
Women's British Open	CUT				CUT	CUT	

Did not play

CUT = missed the half-way cut
NT = no tournament
T = tied

=== Summary ===
Tournament	Wins	2nd	3rd	Top-5	Top-10	Top-25	Events	Cuts made
Chevron Championship	0	0	0	0	0	3	6	5
U.S. Women's Open	0	0	0	0	0	1	5	3
Women's PGA Championship	0	0	0	0	0	1	5	4
The Evian Championship	0	0	0	0	1	1	3	2
Women's British Open	0	0	0	0	0	0	3	0
Totals	0	0	0	0	1	7	22	14

- Most consecutive cuts made – 6 (2023 U.S. Women's Open – 2024 Evian)
- Longest streak of top-10s – 1

== LPGA Tour career summary ==
Year	Tournaments played	Cuts made*	Wins	2nd	3rd	Top 10s	Best finish	Earnings ($)	Money list rank	Scoring average	Scoring rank
2019	1	0	0	0	0	0	CUT	n/a	n/a	76.00	n/a
2020	5	2	0	0	0	0	T13	n/a	n/a	72.50	n/a
2021	8	5	0	0	0	0	T17	n/a	n/a	71.31	n/a
2022	2	1	0	0	0	0	T25	n/a	n/a	72.17	n/a
2023	6	6	0	0	0	0	T19	n/a	n/a	70.96	n/a
2024	25	20	0	0	3	4	3	920,679	41	71.07	40
2025	24	18	0	0	0	1	T9	507,705	66	71.59	79
Totals^	49 (2024)	38 (2024)	0	0	3	5	3	1,428,384	276		

^ Official as of 2025 season
*Includes matchplay and other tournaments without a cut.

== World ranking ==
Position in Women's World Golf Rankings at the end of each calendar year.

Year	Ranking	Source
2020	210	
2021	146	
2022	269	
2023	146	
2024	49	
2025	98	

== Team appearances ==
- Arnold Palmer Cup (representing the International team): 2019 (winners), 2020 (winners)
