= Brandon Wu =

American professional golfer (born 1997)

Personal information
- Nationality: United States
- Born: February 17, 1997 (age 29) Danville, California, U.S.
- Height: 6 ft 0 in (1.83 m)

Career
- Sport: Golf
- College: Stanford University
- Turned professional: 2019
- Current tour: Korn Ferry Tour
- Former tours: PGA Tour; European Tour
- Professional wins: 1
- Highest ranking: 79 (June 11, 2023) (as of October 25, 2026)

Number of wins by tour
- Korn Ferry Tour: 1

Best results in major championships
- Masters Tournament: DNP
- PGA Championship: CUT: 2023
- U.S. Open: T35: 2019
- The Open Championship: CUT: 2019, 2022
Medal record
Pan American Games
Gold medal – first place	2019 Lima	Mixed team

Brandon Wu (born February 17, 1997) is an American professional golfer who currently plays on the DP World Tour and previously competed on the PGA Tour. He won the 2020 Korn Ferry Tour Championship.

== Early life ==
Wu was born in California and lived in the state during his early childhood. When he was eight, his family relocated to Beijing and he spent the next five years competing on the junior golf circuit in China.

Wu's family moved back to the United States when he was 13, taking up residence in Scarsdale, New York. He attended boarding school at Deerfield Academy in Massachusetts and was on the swim team through high school.

== Amateur career ==
He attended Stanford University from 2015 to 2019 and played his college golf for the Stanford Cardinal men's golf team. In his senior year, the team won the NCAA Division I Men's Golf Championship.

Wu played in the 2019 Walker Cup and the 2019 Arnold Palmer Cup. He teamed with Stewart Hagestad, Emilia Migliaccio, and Rose Zhang to win the mixed team gold medal at the 2019 Pan American Games.

Wu's individual achievements include winning the 2017 Porter Cup. He was a semifinalist at the 2018 Western Amateur and competed in U.S. Amateur in 2018 and again in 2019, where he was the stroke play medalist. He was the qualifying medalist for 2019 Open Championship and tied for 35th in 2019 U.S. Open with rounds of 71-69-71-74 (285, +1). Wu had to miss his graduation from Stanford because he was playing in the final round at Pebble Beach. He received his diploma as he walked off the 18th green.

== Professional career ==
Wu turned professional in 2019 and joined the 2020 Korn Ferry Tour with conditional status from a tied 61st place at the 2019 Korn Ferry Tour Final Qualifying Tournament. He did not make a start until the 13th event of the season, the Price Cutter Charity Championship, where he finished tied 9th and earned enough points to climb the priority ranking and compete in four events which granted entry based on the points list. In those four tournaments, he was runner-up at Albertsons Boise Open and won the Korn Ferry Tour Championship.

The victory in the Tour Championship qualified Wu for the 2020 U.S. Open, which was contested at Winged Foot Golf Club in Mamaroneck, New York, near his family's home in Scarsdale. However, Wu missed the cut in the tournament.

Due to the COVID-19 pandemic, there was no Korn Ferry Tour graduating class in 2020, and the season extended into 2021. Wu finished 16th on the points list for the combined 2020-21 Korn Ferry Tour season, with the one win and seven top-10's across 28 starts. That performance earned him a spot on the 2021–22 PGA Tour.

=== 2021-24: PGA Tour membership ===
Wu's PGA Tour experience began poorly, as he missed the cut in nine of his first 10 tournaments. But in March 2022, he broke that streak with a tie for third at the Puerto Rico Open. A few weeks later, Wu fired a tournament course-record 63 in the final round of the Mexico Open, lifting him into a tie for second, just one stroke behind winner Jon Rahm. He also had top-10 finishes at the Genesis Scottish Open and Wyndham Championship and finished 82nd in the FedEx Cup standings to retain his PGA Tour card.

In the 2022–23 PGA Tour season, Wu made a series of cuts during the fall, but did not have a top-25 finish heading into the AT&T Pebble Beach Pro-Am in February. Wu was in contention throughout the event, and a final-round 66 at Pebble Beach gave him a tie for second, three strokes behind winner Justin Rose. Later in the season, Wu took third place at the Mexico Open and tied for ninth at the RBC Canadian Open as he ended up in 57th place in the FedEx Cup standings.

In 2024, Wu's fortunes took a downturn as he made only 15 of 30 cuts on the PGA Tour, with a best result of 10th at the ISCO Championship. He finished 153rd in the FedEx Cup standings and lost his PGA Tour card. Wu decided against a return to the Korn Ferry Tour and instead opted to play in 2025 on the DP World Tour.

Wu's 2025 season was highlighted by his participation in the Volvo China Open, which served as a sort of homecoming. He finished tied for 10th in the event, his best performance of the season. But the rest of the year went poorly for Wu, who made just 10 cuts in 26 events and finished 155th in DP World Tour Race to Dubai season ranking.

== Amateur wins ==
- 2013 AJGA Junior at Centennial
- 2017 Porter Cup
- 2019 The Goodwin

== Professional wins (1) ==
=== Korn Ferry Tour wins (1) ===
Legend
Championship Series (1)
Other Korn Ferry Tour (0)

No.	Date	Tournament	Winning score	Margin of victory	Runner-up
1	Aug 30, 2020	Korn Ferry Tour Championship	−18 (67-69-69-65=270)	1 stroke	(United States) Greyson Sigg

== Results in major championships ==
Tournament	2019	2020	2021	2022	2023	2024	2025	2026
Masters Tournament								
PGA Championship					CUT			
U.S. Open	T35	CUT				T70		CUT
The Open Championship	CUT	NT		CUT				

Did not play

CUT = missed the half-way cut
"T" = tied for place
NT = no tournament due to COVID-19 pandemic

== Results in The Players Championship ==
Tournament	2023	2024
The Players Championship	T19	CUT

CUT = missed the halfway cut
"T" indicates a tie for a place

== U.S. national team appearances ==
Amateur

- Walker Cup: 2019 (winners)
- Arnold Palmer Cup (representing the United States): 2019

== See also ==
- 2021 Korn Ferry Tour Finals graduates
