= John Augenstein =

American professional golfer (born 1997)

Personal information
- Nationality: United States
- Born: October 7, 1997 (age 29) Owensboro, Kentucky, U.S.

Career
- Sport: Golf
- College: Vanderbilt
- Turned professional: 2020
- Current tour: Korn Ferry Tour

Best results in major championships
- Masters Tournament: T55: 2020
- PGA Championship: DNP
- U.S. Open: CUT: 2020
- The Open Championship: DNP

John Augenstein (born October 7, 1997) is an American professional golfer.

In high school, Augenstein was a Kentucky individual state champion and team state finalist at Owensboro Catholic High School.

In college, Augenstein was a first team All-American for the Vanderbilt Commodores.

Augenstein earned an invitation to the 2020 U.S. Open and 2020 Masters Tournament by finishing runner-up at the 2019 U.S. Amateur. At the U.S. Open, he missed the cut. He was one of two amateurs to make the cut at the Masters and finished tied for 55th. He turned professional shortly after the Masters.

== Amateur wins ==
- 2018 Mason Rudolph Championship, Players Amateur
- 2019 Desert Mountain Intercollegiate

== U.S. national team appearances ==
Amateur

- Arnold Palmer Cup: 2019, 2020
- Walker Cup: 2019 (winners)
