= Bay Hill, Florida =

Unincorporated area in Florida, US

- Census-designated place
- Location of Bay Hill in Orange County, Florida.
- Coordinates: 28°27′18″N 81°30′20″W
- Country: United States
- State: Florida
- County: Orange

Area
  - Total: 3.43 sq mi (8.89 km^{2})
  - Land: 2.37 sq mi (6.15 km^{2})
  - Water: 1.06 sq mi (2.74 km^{2})
- Elevation: 102 ft (31 m)

Population (2020)
  - Total: 5,021
  - Density: 2,113.5/sq mi (816.02/km^{2})
- Time zone: UTC-5 (Eastern (EST))
  - Summer (DST): UTC-4 (EDT)
- FIPS code: 12-04070
- GNIS feature ID: 2402665

Bay Hill is a census-designated place (CDP) in Orange County, Florida, United States. The population was 5,021 at the 2020 census. It is part of the Orlando–Kissimmee Metropolitan Statistical Area. The Bay Hill area is generally located on either side of Apopka-Vineland Road in southwest Orange County, north of Lake Buena Vista and south of Windermere.

== Geography ==
According to the United States Census Bureau, the CDP has a total area of 2.5 square miles (6.4 km^{2}), of which 2.4 square miles (6.2 km^{2}) is land and 0.12 square miles (0.3 km^{2}), or 4.01%, is water.

== Demographics ==
Historical population
Census	Pop.	Note	%±
1990	5,346		—
2000	5,177		−3.2%
2010	4,884		−5.7%
2020	5,021		2.8%

=== 2020 census ===
As of the 2020 census, Bay Hill had a population of 5,021. The median age was 49.7 years. 17.8% of residents were under the age of 18 and 24.0% of residents were 65 years of age or older. For every 100 females there were 98.3 males, and for every 100 females age 18 and over there were 96.3 males age 18 and over.

100.0% of residents lived in urban areas, while 0.0% lived in rural areas.

There were 1,915 households in Bay Hill, of which 27.8% had children under the age of 18 living in them. Of all households, 68.5% were married-couple households, 11.0% were households with a male householder and no spouse or partner present, and 17.5% were households with a female householder and no spouse or partner present. About 15.6% of all households were made up of individuals and 7.7% had someone living alone who was 65 years of age or older.

There were 2,107 housing units, of which 9.1% were vacant. The homeowner vacancy rate was 1.6% and the rental vacancy rate was 4.4%.

Racial composition as of the 2020 census
Race	Number	Percent
White	3,585	71.4%
Black or African American	114	2.3%
American Indian and Alaska Native	5	0.1%
Asian	549	10.9%
Native Hawaiian and Other Pacific Islander	5	0.1%
Some other race	142	2.8%
Two or more races	621	12.4%
Hispanic or Latino (of any race)	606	12.1%

=== 2000 census ===
As of the 2000 census, there were 5,177 people, 1,786 households, and 1,500 families residing in the CDP. The population density was 786.9 people/km^{2} (2,038 people/mi^{2}). There were 1,947 housing units at an average density of 296.0 units/km^{2} (767 units/mi^{2}). The racial makeup of the CDP was 85.11% White, 2.28% African American, 0.17% Native American, 9.52% Asian, 0.64% from other races, and 2.28% from two or more races. Hispanic or Latino of any race were 5.70% of the population.

There were 1,786 households, out of which 39.2% had children under the age of 18 living with them, 76.3% were married couples living together, 5.4% had a female householder with no husband present, and 16.0% were non-families. 12.4% of all households were made up of individuals, and 4.1% had someone living alone who was 65 years of age or older. The average household size was 2.90 and the average family size was 3.17.

In the CDP, the population was spread out, with 26.5% under the age of 18, 5.6% from 18 to 24, 25.0% from 25 to 44, 32.2% from 45 to 64, and 10.8% who were 65 years of age or older. The median age was 42 years. For every 100 females, there were 97.8 males. For every 100 females age 18 and over, there were 96.0 males.

The median income for a household in the CDP was $99,894, and the median income for a family was $101,246. Males had a median income of $78,170 versus $38,889 for females. The per capita income for the CDP was $46,744. About 3.8% of families and 4.3% of the population were below the poverty line, including 4.2% of those under age 18 and 2.7% of those age 65 or over.

== Education ==
Residents are zoned to Orange County Public Schools.

Four elementary schools serve sections of Bay Hill: Palm Lake, Dr. Phillips Elementary, Bay Meadows, and Windermere. Most of Bay Hill is zoned to Southwest Middle School, while a section is zoned to Chain of Lakes Middle School. All residents are zoned to Dr. Phillips High School.
