= John Pak =

American professional golfer (born 1998)

Personal information
- Nationality: United States
- Born: December 18, 1998 (age 27) Scotch Plains, New Jersey, U.S.
- Height: 5 ft 9 in (175 cm)
- Weight: 175 lb (79 kg)

Career
- Sport: Golf
- College: Florida State University
- Turned professional: 2021
- Current tour: PGA Tour
- Former tours: Korn Ferry Tour; PGA Tour Canada
- Professional wins: 2

Number of wins by tour
- Korn Ferry Tour: 1
- Other: 1

Best results in major championships
- Masters Tournament: DNP
- PGA Championship: DNP
- U.S. Open: T51: 2020
- The Open Championship: DNP

Achievements and awards
- Haskins Award: 2021
- Ben Hogan Award: 2021
- Jack Nicklaus Award: 2021

John Pak (born December 18, 1998) is an American professional golfer.

Pak was raised in Scotch Plains, New Jersey, Pak attended Scotch Plains-Fanwood High School for one year before moving to Orlando, Florida to train.

As a junior golfer, he was named to the Rolex Junior First Team All-American by the American Junior Golf Association. He was ranked seventh in the 2017 signing class and 15th among all junior golfers according to Golfweek.

In 2017, he began playing collegiate golf for the Florida State Seminoles men's golf team. During his time as a Seminole, Pak has won the Sea Best Invitational, 2019 & 2020 Mobile Sports Authority Intercollegiate, Rod Myers Invitational, 2018 & 2020 Seminole Intercollegiate, and the 2019 ACC Championship.

Pak was selected to the 2019 Walker Cup team.

Pak swept the college golf awards in 2021 as a senior, winning the Haskins Award, Ben Hogan Award, and Jack Nicklaus Award. He turned professional in June 2021 and made his professional debut at the Palmetto Championship on the PGA Tour.

== Accolades ==
- The only player with a perfect record in the 2019 Walker Cup
- 2019 Jack Nicklaus Award Semifinalist
- 2018 ACC Freshman of the Year
- Established the single-year scoring average record at Florida State, shooting 69.56 as a sophomore

== Amateur wins ==
- 2014 AJGA Annapolis Junior
- 2018 Seminole Intercollegiate, Rod Myers Invitational
- 2019 Sea Best Invitational, Mobile Sports Authority Intercollegiate, ACC Championship
- 2020 Mobile Sports Authority Intercollegiate, Seminole Intercollegiate
- 2021 The Calusa Cup

== Professional wins (2) ==
=== Korn Ferry Tour wins (1) ===
| No. | Date | Tournament | Winning score | Margin of victory | Runner-up |
|---|---|---|---|---|---|
| 1 | Jun 23, 2024 | Compliance Solutions Championship | −23 (64-66-65-70=265) | 3 strokes | (United States) Jackson Suber |

=== PGA Tour Canada wins (1) ===
| No. | Date | Tournament | Winning score | Margin of victory | Runners-up |
|---|---|---|---|---|---|
| 1 | Jun 25, 2023 | Elk Ridge Saskatchewan Open | −21 (66-64-66-63=259) | 4 strokes | (United States) Connor Howe, (United States) Chris Korte |

== Results in major championships ==
| Tournament | 2020 |
|---|---|
| Masters Tournament | |
| PGA Championship | |
| U.S. Open | T51LA |
| The Open Championship | NT |

Did not play

"T" = tied
LA = low amateur
NT = no tournament due to COVID-19 pandemic

== U.S. national team appearances ==
- Walker Cup: 2019 (winners), 2021 (winners)
- Arnold Palmer Cup: 2020

== See also ==
- 2024 Korn Ferry Tour graduates
