= Andy Ogletree =

American professional golfer (born 1998)

Personal information
- Full name: Andrew Ogletree
- Nationality: United States
- Born: April 3, 1998 (age 28) Little Rock, Mississippi, U.S.
- Height: 6 ft 1 in (1.85 m)
- Weight: 176 lb (80 kg; 12.6 st)

Career
- Sport: Golf
- College: Georgia Tech
- Turned professional: 2020
- Current tour: Asian Tour
- Former tour: LIV Golf
- Professional wins: 3

Number of wins by tour
- Asian Tour: 3

Best results in major championships
- Masters Tournament: T34: 2020
- PGA Championship: CUT: 2024
- U.S. Open: CUT: 2020
- The Open Championship: 79th: 2024

Achievements and awards
- Asian Tour Order of Merit winner: 2023
- Asian Tour International Series Order of Merit winner: 2023
- Asian Tour Player of the Year: 2023

Andrew Ogletree (born April 3, 1998) is an American professional golfer who plays on the LIV Golf League and hails from Union, Mississippi. He won the 2019 U.S. Amateur.

== Amateur career ==
Ogletree attended Union High School in Union, Mississippi, leading his team to the Mississippi state championship in 2016. He also won the individual state championship that year. In 2015 he reached the quarter-finals of the U.S. Junior Amateur and qualified for the U.S. Amateur for the first time.

Ogletree began attending Georgia Tech in 2016. In 2019, his senior year, he won the Monroe Invitational by two shots with a score of 279 (−1). In August, he won the U.S. Amateur at Pinehurst, defeating John Augenstein of Vanderbilt, 2 and 1, in the championship match. Ogletree was the third Georgia Tech player to win the title, joining Bobby Jones (five times) and Matt Kuchar. By winning the Havemeyer Trophy, he earned exemptions into the 2020 Masters Tournament, U.S. Open and Open Championship. Ogletree was the low amateur at the 2020 Masters.

== Professional career ==
Ogletree turned professional shortly after the 2020 Masters in November. In his first event as a professional, he finished tied for 46th place at the Mayakoba Golf Classic. Ogletree missed the cut in his first three events in 2021 and then had hip surgery.

In June 2022, Ogletree played in the first event of the LIV Golf Invitational Series. Despite his conditional status on the Korn Ferry Tour not gaining him entry to play in any PGA Tour sanctioned tournament that week, he was not granted a release to play in the LIV Golf event by the tour and subsequently suspended from all PGA Tour sanctioned events until January 2023. He didn't play any further part in the LIV Golf series during 2022, but through playing in the first event he was granted exemptions into the Asian Tour's International Series events. In November 2022, he won his first tournament as a professional at the International Series Egypt, giving him a two-year exemption on the Asian Tour.

During the 2023 Asian Tour season, Ogletree won International Series events in Qatar and England. He also had top-10 finishes in International Series events in Oman, Scotland, Singapore, and China. These performances led to Ogletree winning the International Series Order of Merit for 2023, earning him a playing spot in the 2024 LIV Golf League.

== Amateur wins ==
- 2013 Evitt Foundation RTC Junior All-Star
- 2016 Cardinal Amateur
- 2019 Monroe Invitational, U.S. Amateur

== Professional wins (3) ==
=== Asian Tour wins (3) ===
Legend
International Series (3)
Other Asian Tour (0)

No.	Date	Tournament	Winning score	Margin of victory	Runner-up
1	13 Nov 2022	International Series Egypt	−23 (66-64-65-62=257)	4 strokes	(Austria) Bernd Wiesberger
2	19 Feb 2023	International Series Qatar	−7 (71-71-66-73=281)	3 strokes	(Thailand) Gunn Charoenkul
3	20 Aug 2023	International Series England	−16 (72-65-67-64=268)	7 strokes	(England) Ian Poulter

== Results in major championships ==
Results not in chronological order in 2020.

Tournament	2020	2021	2022	2023	2024
Masters Tournament	T34LA				
PGA Championship					CUT
U.S. Open	CUT				
The Open Championship	NT				79

Did not play

LA = low amateur
CUT = missed the half-way cut
"T" = tied
NT = no tournament due to COVID-19 pandemic

== U.S. national team appearances ==
Amateur

- Walker Cup: 2019 (winners)
- The Spirit International Amateur Golf Championship: 2019
