= Davis Thompson =

American professional golfer (born 1999)

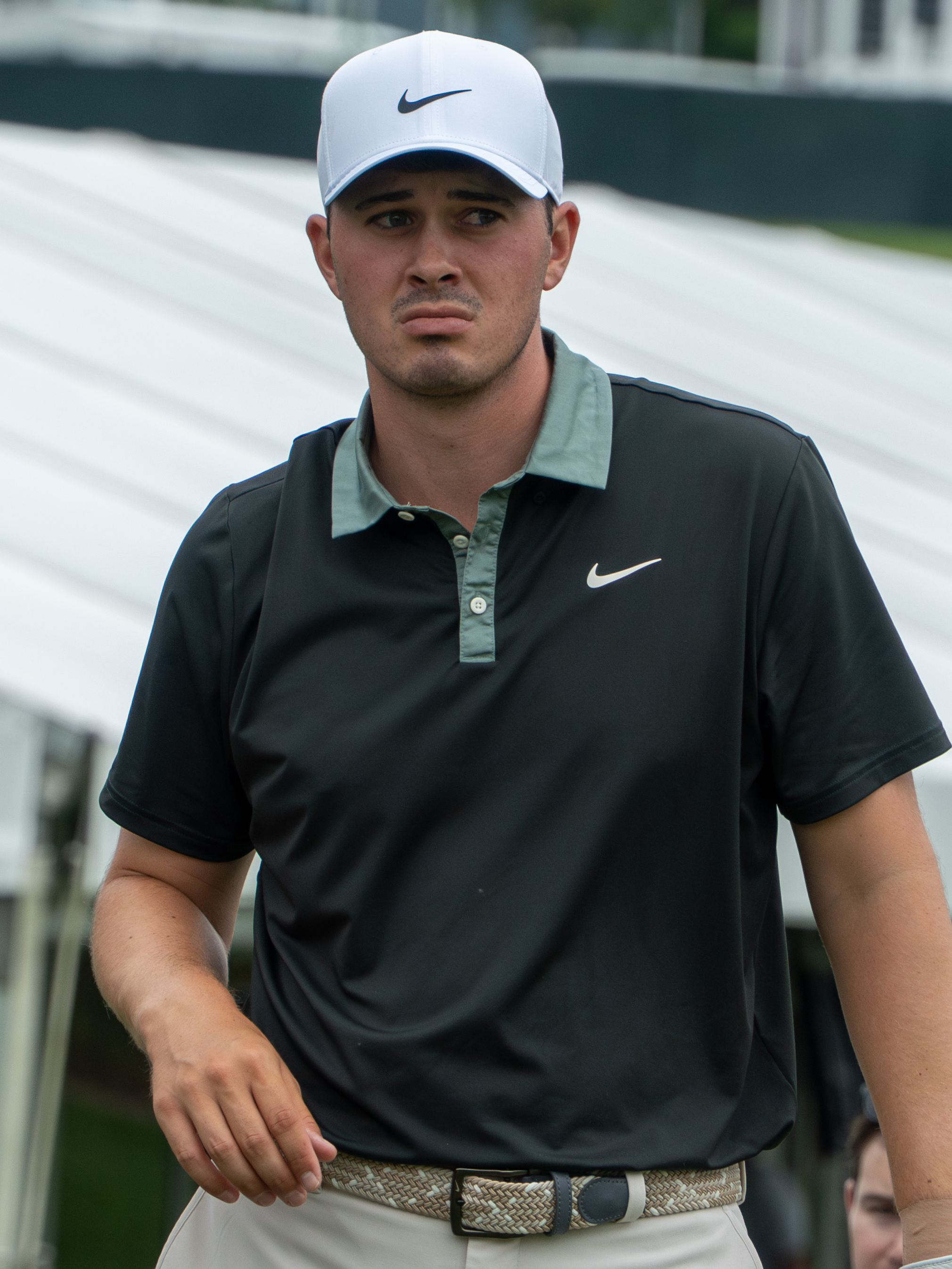
- Thompson at the 2025 Travelers Championship

Personal information
- Nationality: United States
- Born: June 5, 1999 (age 27) Atlanta, Georgia, U.S.
- Height: 6 ft 4 in (1.93 m)
- Weight: 195 lb (88 kg; 13.9 st)

Career
- Sport: Golf
- College: University of Georgia
- Turned professional: 2021
- Current tour: PGA Tour
- Former tour: Korn Ferry Tour
- Professional wins: 2
- Highest ranking: 38 (July 7, 2024) (as of October 25, 2026)

Number of wins by tour
- PGA Tour: 1
- Korn Ferry Tour: 1

Best results in major championships
- Masters Tournament: T46: 2025
- PGA Championship: CUT: 2023, 2025
- U.S. Open: T9: 2024
- The Open Championship: T66: 2024

Achievements and awards
- SEC Player of the Year: 2021

Davis Thompson (born June 5, 1999) is an American professional golfer who plays on the PGA Tour. He won the 2022 Rex Hospital Open and was number one in the World Amateur Golf Ranking in 2020 and 2021. Thompson earned his first PGA Tour win at the John Deere Classic on July 7, 2024, earning an invitation to play in the 2024 Open Championship, and the 2025 Masters Tournament in the process.

== Amateur career ==
Thompson was born in Atlanta, Georgia, but later moved to Auburn, Alabama and attended the Lee-Scott Academy, which he helped win six consecutive team state titles (2012–2017). He captured the individual state title in 2013 and 2015.

He played collegiately at the University of Georgia for four seasons between 2017 and 2021, where he earned All-America First Team laurels his final two years, and was the 2021 Southeastern Conference Player of the Year. He won four individual titles at Georgia, including the NCAA Regionals in 2019 and 2021.

Thompson won the 2020 Jones Cup Invitational, and was runner-up at the event in 2019 and 2021. He was the stroke play medalist at the 2019 Western Amateur.

He played in the 2020 Arnold Palmer Cup and the 2021 Walker Cup.

Thompson reached number one in the World Amateur Golf Ranking in November 2020 and March 2021, and finished number two in the inaugural PGA Tour University Class of 2021.

== Professional career ==
Thompson turned professional after his graduation in 2021 and joined the Korn Ferry Tour.

He shot a bogey-free 9-under 63 to hold a two-stroke lead after the first round of the Rocket Mortgage Classic before finishing T58 in his seventh career PGA Tour start and third as a professional.

Thompson earned his card for the 2022–23 PGA Tour as he finished the 2022 Korn Ferry Tour season 16th on the points list, recording four top-10s, including a win at the Rex Hospital Open on his 23rd birthday.

In 2023, he was runner-up at The American Express, one stroke behind Jon Rahm, after his putt on the penultimate hole struck the pin nearly dead-center and ricochet a foot and a half past.

Thompson won his first career PGA Tour event at the 2024 John Deere Classic. Thompson's 28-under-par for the tournament was the lowest 72-hole score in the tournament's history, surpassing Michael Kim's 27-under-par at the 2018 edition.

== Amateur wins ==
- 2019 NCAA Athens Regional, Jim Rivers Intercollegiate
- 2020 Jones Cup Invitational
- 2021 Tiger Invitational, NCAA Tallahassee Regional

== Professional wins (2) ==
=== PGA Tour wins (1) ===
| No. | Date | Tournament | Winning score | Margin of victory | Runners-up |
|---|---|---|---|---|---|
| 1 | Jul 7, 2024 | John Deere Classic | −28 (63-67-62-64=256) | 4 strokes | (United States) Luke Clanton (a), (Taiwan) Pan Cheng-tsung, (United States) Michael Thorbjornsen |

=== Korn Ferry Tour wins (1) ===
| No. | Date | Tournament | Winning score | Margin of victory | Runners-up |
|---|---|---|---|---|---|
| 1 | Jun 5, 2022 | Rex Hospital Open | −17 (64-66-68-69=267) | 1 stroke | (Sweden) Vincent Norrman, (United States) Andrew Yun |

== Results in major championships ==
| Tournament | 2020 | 2021 | 2022 | 2023 | 2024 | 2025 | 2026 |
|---|---|---|---|---|---|---|---|
| Masters Tournament | | | | | | T46 | |
| PGA Championship | | | | CUT | | CUT | |
| U.S. Open | CUT | | | CUT | T9 | CUT | CUT |
| The Open Championship | NT | | | | T66 | CUT | |

Top 10
Did not play

CUT = missed the half-way cut
"T" = tied for place
NT = no tournament due to COVID-19 pandemic

=== Summary ===
| Tournament | Wins | 2nd | 3rd | Top-5 | Top-10 | Top-25 | Events | Cuts made |
|---|---|---|---|---|---|---|---|---|
| Masters Tournament | 0 | 0 | 0 | 0 | 0 | 0 | 1 | 1 |
| PGA Championship | 0 | 0 | 0 | 0 | 0 | 0 | 2 | 0 |
| U.S. Open | 0 | 0 | 0 | 0 | 1 | 1 | 5 | 1 |
| The Open Championship | 0 | 0 | 0 | 0 | 0 | 0 | 2 | 1 |
| Totals | 0 | 0 | 0 | 0 | 1 | 1 | 10 | 3 |

- Most consecutive cuts made – 3 (2024 U.S. Open – 2025 Masters)
- Longest streak of top-10s – 1 (once)

== Results in The Players Championship ==
| Tournament | 2023 | 2024 | 2025 | 2026 |
|---|---|---|---|---|
| The Players Championship | 68 | CUT | T10 | CUT |

Top 10

CUT = missed the halfway cut

== Results in World Golf Championships ==
| Tournament | 2023 |
|---|---|
| Match Play | T31 |

"T" = Tied

== U.S. national team appearances ==
Amateur

- Arnold Palmer Cup: 2020
- Walker Cup: 2021 (winners)

== See also ==
- 2022 Korn Ferry Tour Finals graduates
