= Cole Hammer =

American professional golfer (born 1999)

Personal information
- Nationality: United States
- Born: August 28, 1999 (age 27)

Career
- Sport: Golf
- College: University of Texas
- Turned professional: 2022
- Current tour: Korn Ferry Tour

Best results in major championships
- Masters Tournament: DNP
- PGA Championship: DNP
- U.S. Open: CUT: 2015, 2020, 2021, 2026
- The Open Championship: CUT: 2021

Achievements and awards
- Mark H. McCormack Medal: 2019

Cole Hammer (born August 28, 1999) is an American professional golfer.

== College career ==
Hammer competed for the Texas Longhorns and was Big 12 Conference champion in 2021.

== Amateur career ==
Hammer has competed in three U.S. Opens and two Walker Cups.

In 2018, he won the U.S. Amateur Four-Ball, partnering with Garrett Barber.

Additionally, in 2019 he won the Mark H. McCormack Medal as the best amateur golfer in the world.

In 2022, Hammer ended his college and amateur career as part of the winning team at the 2022 NCAA Division I Championship.

== Professional career ==
Hammer turned professional in June 2022 after the NCAA Championship and made his professional debut at the Wichita Open on the Korn Ferry Tour. As of August 2025, he has 4 top 10 finishes on the Korn Ferry Tour and had a career high $147,033 in earnings in 2024. In 2023 he finished 5th at the RSM Classic, his best PGA Tour finish so far.

== Amateur wins ==
- 2018 Azalea Invitational, Western Amateur
- 2019 Southern Highlands Collegiate, Lamkin Grips SD Classic, NCAA Austin Regional
- 2020 South Beach International Amateur
- 2021 Big 12 Men's Championship

== Playoff record ==
Korn Ferry Tour playoff record (0–1)

No.	Year	Tournament	Opponents	Result
1	2026	Utah Championship	(United States) Mason Andersen, (United States) Derek Hitchner, (United States) Tommy Morrison, (United States) Travis Trace	Hitchner won with birdie on first extra hole

== Results in major championships ==
Results not in chronological order in 2020.

Tournament	2015	2016	2017	2018
Masters Tournament				
U.S. Open	CUT			
The Open Championship				
PGA Championship				

Tournament	2019	2020	2021	2022	2023	2024	2025	2026
Masters Tournament								
PGA Championship								
U.S. Open		CUT	CUT					CUT
The Open Championship		NT	CUT					

Did not play

CUT = missed the halfway cut
NT = no tournament due to COVID-19 pandemic

== U.S. national team appearances ==
Amateur

- Junior Presidents Cup: 2017 (winners)
- Eisenhower Trophy: 2018
- Arnold Palmer Cup: 2019
- Walker Cup: 2019 (winners), 2021 (winners)
