= World Amateur Golf Ranking =

The World Amateur Golf Ranking for men was introduced by The R&A, the governing body of the sport of golf outside the United States and Mexico, on 23 January 2007. It is based on the results of over 2,600 amateur tournaments per year (and amateurs participating in certain professional events) and is updated each Wednesday. Rankings are based on the players' average performances in counting events over a rolling period. This period was 52 weeks initially but was gradually expanded during 2016 to 104 weeks, similar to those of the Official World Golf Ranking.

Like the Official World Golf Ranking for male professional golfers, the amateur ranking was initiated by The R&A to provide a more reliable means of selecting an appropriate field for one of its tournaments. The professional ranking was initially used to help set the field for The Open Championship and the amateur ranking plays a role in selecting the field for The Amateur Championship, which was previously selected mainly on the basis of national handicap systems. Other tournament organisers will be able to use the rankings to select players if they so wish.

The first set of rankings featured over 1,000 players from 46 countries and was headed by the 2006 U.S. Amateur champion, Richie Ramsay of Scotland.

In February 2011, the United States Golf Association (USGA) endorsed the rankings and announced it would use them for an exemption category in all their men's amateur championships, including the U.S. Amateur, beginning in 2011.

The women's rankings were started in February 2011. Japan's Mitsuki Katahira was the first number one. American Rose Zhang holds the record for most weeks at the top of the rankings with 142 weeks.

Only three male and two female golfers have ever held the No. 1-ranking as both an amateur and a professional. The first to do so was Rory McIlroy, who was 17 years, 9 months and 2 days when he became the No. 1 amateur and 22 years and 10 months when he first became the world No. 1 professional. Jordan Spieth was the second to accomplish this feat, he was 18 years, 10 months and 24 days when he topped the amateur rankings and 22 years and 20 days when he reached No. 1 in the Official World Golf Ranking. Jon Rahm, who was ranked no. 1 for 60 weeks, became professional world no. 1 in July 2020. Lydia Ko was the first player to accomplish this feat in the female ranking. She was only 14 years and 3 days and held the ranking for a record 130 consecutive weeks, and she was a mere 17 years, 9 months and 9 days when she first reached the pinnacle of the Women's World Golf Rankings (WWGR). Atthaya Thitikul held the amateur No. 1 for 12 weeks in 2019–2020 and topped the WWGR on 31 October 2022.

== Chronology of men's world number ones ==
#	Player	Country	First week	Last week	Weeks	Total weeks
1	Richie Ramsay	Scotland	23 Jan 2007	30 Jan 2007	2	2
2	Rory McIlroy	Northern Ireland	6 Feb 2007	6 Feb 2007	1	1
3	Jamie Moul	England	13 Feb 2007	30 May 2007	17	–
4	Jamie Lovemark	United States	6 Jun 2007	6 Jun 2007	1	–
	Jamie Moul (2)	England	13 Jun 2007	13 Jun 2007	1	18
	Jamie Lovemark (2)	United States	20 Jun 2007	3 Aug 2007	7	8
5	Rickie Fowler	United States	7 Aug 2007	21 Aug 2007	3	–
6	Colt Knost	United States	29 Aug 2007	24 Sep 2007	5	5
	Rickie Fowler (2)	United States	5 Oct 2007	27 Feb 2008	22	–
7	Danny Willett	England	5 Mar 2008	21 May 2008	12	12
	Rickie Fowler (3)	United States	28 May 2008	25 Jun 2008	5	–
8	Michael Thompson	United States	2 Jul 2008	2 Jul 2008	1	1
	Rickie Fowler (4)	United States	9 Jul 2008	13 Aug 2008	6	36
9	Danny Lee	New Zealand	20 Aug 2008	15 Apr 2009	34	34
10	Scott Arnold	Australia	23 Apr 2009	20 May 2009	5	5
11	Morgan Hoffmann	United States	27 May 2009	10 Jun 2009	2	2
12	Nick Taylor	Canada	17 Jun 2009	28 Oct 2009	20	20
13	Victor Dubuisson	France	4 Nov 2009	23 Dec 2009	8	8
14	Matteo Manassero	Italy	30 Dec 2009	28 Apr 2010	18	18
15	Peter Uihlein	United States	5 May 2010	16 Jun 2010	7	–
16	Jin Jeong	South Korea	23 Jun 2010	30 Jun 2010	2	–
	Peter Uihlein (2)	United States	7 Jul 2010	21 Jul 2010	3	–
	Jin Jeong (2)	South Korea	28 Jul 2010	11 Aug 2010	3	5
	Peter Uihlein (3)	United States	18 Aug 2010	22 Dec 2010	19	–
17	David Chung	United States	29 Dec 2010	5 Jan 2011	2	2
	Peter Uihlein (4)	United States	12 Jan 2011	16 Mar 2011	10	–
18	Patrick Cantlay	United States	23 Mar 2011	23 Mar 2011	1	–
	Peter Uihlein (5)	United States	30 Mar 2011	1 Jun 2011	10	49
	Patrick Cantlay (2)	United States	8 Jun 2011	13 Jun 2012	54	55
19	Jordan Spieth	United States	20 Jun 2012	18 Jul 2012	5	5
20	Chris Williams	United States	25 Jul 2012	25 Jul 2012	1	–
21	Hideki Matsuyama	Japan	1 Aug 2012	1 Aug 2012	1	1
	Chris Williams (2)	United States	8 Aug 2012	12 Jun 2013	45	46
22	Brady Watt	Australia	19 Jun 2013	19 Jun 2013	1	1
23	Pan Cheng-tsung	Chinese Taipei	26 Jun 2013	14 Aug 2013	8	8
24	Matt Fitzpatrick	England	21 Aug 2013	16 Oct 2013	9	–
25	Cory Whitsett	United States	23 Oct 2013	27 Nov 2013	6	6
	Matt Fitzpatrick (2)	England	4 Dec 2013	19 Feb 2014	12	21
26	Patrick Rodgers	United States	26 Feb 2014	11 Jun 2014	16	16
27	Ollie Schniederjans	United States	18 Jun 2014	25 Mar 2015	41	41
28	Jon Rahm	Spain	1 Apr 2015	16 Sep 2015	25	–
29	Maverick McNealy	United States	23 Sep 2015	21 Oct 2015	5	–
	Jon Rahm (2)	Spain	28 Oct 2015	22 Jun 2016	35	60
	Maverick McNealy (2)	United States	29 Jun 2016	8 Mar 2017	37	–
30	Curtis Luck	Australia	15 Mar 2017	15 Mar 2017	1	–
	Maverick McNealy (3)	United States	22 Mar 2017	22 Mar 2017	1	–
	Curtis Luck (2)	Australia	29 Mar 2017	12 Apr 2017	3	4
	Maverick McNealy (4)	United States	19 Apr 2017	10 May 2017	4	47
31	Joaquín Niemann	Chile	17 May 2017	11 Apr 2018	48	48
32	Braden Thornberry	United States	18 Apr 2018	25 Apr 2018	2	–
33	Collin Morikawa	United States	2 May 2018	16 May 2018	3	3
34	Doug Ghim	United States	23 May 2018	20 Jun 2018	5	5
	Braden Thornberry (2)	United States	27 Jun 2018	10 Oct 2018	16	18
35	Justin Suh	United States	17 Oct 2018	10 Apr 2019	26	26
36	Viktor Hovland	Norway	17 Apr 2019	19 Jun 2019	10	10
37	Cole Hammer	United States	26 Jun 2019	21 Aug 2019	9	–
38	Takumi Kanaya	Japan	28 Aug 2019	28 Aug 2019	1	–
	Cole Hammer (2)	United States	4 Sep 2019	18 Sep 2019	3	12
	Takumi Kanaya (2)	Japan	25 Sep 2019	30 Sep 2020	54	55
39	Ricky Castillo	United States	7 Oct 2020	4 Nov 2020	5	5
40	Davis Thompson	United States	11 Nov 2020	11 Nov 2020	1	–
41	Kevin Yu	Chinese Taipei	18 Nov 2020	18 Nov 2020	1	1
42	Keita Nakajima	Japan	25 Nov 2020	17 Feb 2021	13	–
	Davis Thompson (2)	United States	24 Feb 2021	7 Apr 2021	7	8
43	Pierceson Coody	United States	14 Apr 2021	14 Apr 2021	1	1
	Keita Nakajima (2)	Japan	21 Apr 2021	14 Sep 2022	74	87^
44	Ludvig Åberg	Sweden	21 Sep 2022	21 Sep 2022	1	–
45	Taiga Semikawa	Japan	28 Sep 2022	26 Oct 2022	5	5
	Ludvig Åberg (2)	Sweden	2 Nov 2022	8 Feb 2023	15	–
46	Gordon Sargent	United States	15 Feb 2023	22 Feb 2023	2	–
	Ludvig Åberg (3)	Sweden	1 Mar 2023	15 Mar 2023	3	–
	Gordon Sargent (2)	United States	22 Mar 2023	29 Mar 2023	2	–
	Ludvig Åberg (4)	Sweden	5 Apr 2023	7 Jun 2023	10	29
	Gordon Sargent (3)	United States	14 Jun 2023	13 Sep 2023	14	–
47	Christo Lamprecht	South Africa	20 Sep 2023	27 Sep 2023	2	–
	Gordon Sargent (4)	United States	4 Oct 2023	4 Oct 2023	1	–
	Christo Lamprecht (2)	South Africa	11 Oct 2023	18 Oct 2023	2	–
	Gordon Sargent (5)	United States	25 Oct 2023	1 Nov 2023	2	–
	Christo Lamprecht (3)	South Africa	8 Nov 2023	29 Nov 2023	4	–
	Gordon Sargent (6)	United States	6 Dec 2023	17 Jan 2024	7	–
48	Nick Dunlap	United States	24 Jan 2024	31 Jan 2024	2	2
	Christo Lamprecht (4)	South Africa	7 Feb 2024	7 Feb 2024	1	–
	Gordon Sargent (7)	United States	14 Feb 2024	21 Feb 2024	2	–
	Christo Lamprecht (5)	South Africa	28 Feb 2024	10 Apr 2024	7	–
	Gordon Sargent (8)	United States	17 Apr 2024	17 Apr 2024	1	–
	Christo Lamprecht (6)	South Africa	24 Apr 2024	29 May 2024	6	22
	Gordon Sargent (9)	United States	5 Jun 2024	7 Aug 2024	10	41
49	Luke Clanton	United States	14 Aug 2024	4 Jun 2025	43	43
50	Jackson Koivun	United States	11 Jun 2025	1 Jul 2026	56	56
51	Preston Stout	United States	8 Jul 2026	4 Nov 2026	18	18

Key

^	Record

== Chronology of women's world number ones ==
#	Player	Country	First week	Last week	Weeks	Total weeks
1	Mitsuki Katahira	Japan	16 Feb 2011	2 Mar 2011	3	–
2	Cecilia Cho	New Zealand	9 Mar 2011	9 Mar 2011	1	1
	Mitsuki Katahira (2)	Japan	16 Mar 2011	20 Apr 2011	6	9
3	Lydia Ko	New Zealand	27 Apr 2011	16 Oct 2013	130	130
4	Su-Hyun Oh	Australia	23 Oct 2013	23 Oct 2013	1	–
5	Alison Lee	United States	30 Oct 2013	20 Nov 2013	4	–
	Su-Hyun Oh (2)	Australia	27 Nov 2013	27 Nov 2013	1	2
	Alison Lee (2)	United States	4 Dec 2013	19 Feb 2014	12	16
6	Minjee Lee	Australia	26 Feb 2014	3 Sep 2014	28	28
7	Brooke Henderson	Canada	10 Sep 2014	17 Dec 2014	15	15
8	Céline Boutier	France	24 Dec 2014	1 Apr 2015	15	15
9	Andrea Lee	United States	8 Apr 2015	6 May 2015	5	–
10	Leona Maguire	Ireland	13 May 2015	4 May 2016	52	–
11	Hannah O'Sullivan	United States	11 May 2016	27 Jul 2016	12	12
	Leona Maguire (2)	Ireland	3 Aug 2016	28 Feb 2018	83	135
12	Lilia Kha-Tu Vu	United States	7 Mar 2018	4 Jul 2018	18	–
13	Jennifer Kupcho	United States	11 Jul 2018	25 Jul 2018	3	–
	Lilia Kha-Tu Vu (2)	United States	1 Aug 2018	1 Aug 2018	1	–
	Jennifer Kupcho (2)	United States	8 Aug 2018	24 Oct 2018	12	–
	Lilia Kha-Tu Vu (3)	United States	31 Oct 2018	16 Jan 2019	12	31
	Jennifer Kupcho (3)	United States	23 Jan 2019	29 May 2019	19	34
	Andrea Lee (2)	United States	5 Jun 2019	5 Jun 2019	1	–
14	Frida Kinhult	Sweden	12 Jun 2019	12 Jun 2019	1	–
	Andrea Lee (3)	United States	19 Jun 2019	19 Jun 2019	1	–
15	Atthaya Thitikul	Thailand	26 Jun 2019	26 Jun 2019	1	–
	Frida Kinhult (2)	Sweden	3 Jul 2019	7 Aug 2019	6	7
	Andrea Lee (4)	United States	14 Aug 2019	16 Oct 2019	10	17
	Atthaya Thitikul (2)	Thailand	23 Oct 2019	1 Jan 2020	11	12
16	Pauline Roussin-Bouchard	France	8 Jan 2020	26 Aug 2020	34	34
17	Yu-Chiang Hou	Chinese Taipei	2 Sep 2020	9 Sep 2020	2	2
18	Rose Zhang	United States	16 Sep 2020	31 May 2023	142	142^
19	Ingrid Lindblad	Sweden	7 Jun 2023	5 Jun 2024	53	53
20	Lottie Woad	England	12 Jun 2024	10 Jul 2024	5	–
21	Helen Briem	Germany	17 Jul 2024	24 Jul 2024	2	2
	Lottie Woad (2)	England	31 Jul 2024	23 Jul 2025	52	57
22	Kiara Romero	United States	30 Jul 2025	19 Aug 2026	56	56
23	Paula Martín Sampedro	Spain	26 Aug 2026	26 Aug 2026	1	1
24	Andrea Revuelta	Spain	2 Sep 2026	16 Sep 2026	3	3
25	Farah O'Keefe	United States	23 Sep 2026	4 Nov 2026	7	7

Key

^	Record

== Elite events ==
Prior to 2020, events were ranked in eight categories: Elite, A, B, C, D, E, F or G. The Elite events are listed below. The calculation of the ranking changed in 2020 and there are no longer any categories.

=== Men ===
- The Amateur Championship
- European Amateur
- U.S. Amateur
- Asia-Pacific Amateur Championship
- Eisenhower Trophy
- NCAA Division I Men's Golf Championships (beginning in 2016)

=== Women ===
- The Women's Amateur Championship
- European Ladies Amateur Championship
- U.S. Women's Amateur
- NCAA Division I Women's Golf Championships
- Women's Amateur Asia-Pacific (beginning in 2018)
- Espirito Santo Trophy
