= James Sugrue =

Irish professional golfer (born 1998)

Personal information
- Nationality: Ireland
- Born: 9 December 1998 (age 27) Mallow, County Cork, Ireland

Career
- Sport: Golf
- Turned professional: 2021
- Current tour: Challenge Tour
- Former tour: Clutch Pro Tour

Best results in major championships
- Masters Tournament: CUT: 2020
- PGA Championship: DNP
- U.S. Open: CUT: 2020
- The Open Championship: CUT: 2019

James Sugrue (born 9 December 1998) is an Irish professional golfer who won The Amateur Championship in 2019, qualifying for three majors.

== Results in major championships ==
Results not in chronological order in 2020.

Tournament	2019	2020
Masters Tournament		CUT
PGA Championship		
U.S. Open		CUT
The Open Championship	CUT	NT

Did not play

CUT = missed the halfway cut
NT = no tournament due to COVID-19 pandemic
