= Ricky Castillo =

American professional golfer (born 2001)

Personal information
- Nationality: United States
- Born: August 28, 2001 (age 25) Yorba Linda, California, U.S.
- Height: 6 ft 1 in (185 cm)
- Weight: 160 lb (73 kg)

Career
- Sport: Golf
- College: University of Florida
- Turned professional: 2023
- Current tour: PGA Tour
- Former tour: Korn Ferry Tour
- Professional wins: 2
- Highest ranking: 81 (September 27, 2026) (as of October 25, 2026)

Number of wins by tour
- PGA Tour: 1
- Korn Ferry Tour: 1

Best results in major championships
- Masters Tournament: DNP
- PGA Championship: CUT: 2026
- U.S. Open: CUT: 2020
- The Open Championship: DNP

Achievements and awards
- SEC Freshman of the Year: 2020

Ricky Castillo (born August 28, 2001) is an American professional golfer who plays on the PGA Tour.

== Early life ==
Born in Yorba Linda, California, Castillo began playing golf as a young child and attended Valencia High School in Placentia, California.

== Amateur career ==
Castillo earned an exemption into the 2020 U.S. Open at Winged Foot, but missed the cut. From October 7 to November 4, 2020, Castillo was number one on the World Amateur Golf Ranking.

Castillo attended the University of Florida in 2019. As a freshman in 2020, he was honored with both the NCAA Division I Phil Mickelson Outstanding Freshman Award and SEC Freshman of the Year honors.

Castillo also represented the United States in team events at the Walker Cup (helping the U.S. win in 2021) and the Arnold Palmer Cup.

In 2023, Castillo played on the Florida Gators team that won the NCAA Golf Championship.

== Professional career ==
Following his collegiate career, Castillo turned professional in 2023. He initially earned conditional status on the Korn Ferry Tour through PGA Tour University and, in his debut, won the Blue Cross and Blue Shield of Kansas Wichita Open in June 2023. He later earned a PGA Tour card for the 2024–25 season.

In March 2025, Castillo took the place of Victor Perez in the 2025 Players Championship after the French golfer withdrew due to a back injury.

In March 2026, Castillo won the Puerto Rico Open for his first PGA Tour title.

== Amateur wins ==
- 2016 Los Angeles City Junior, Winn Grips Heather Farr Classic
- 2018 Los Angeles City Junior Championship, PING Heather Farr Classic
- 2020 Sea Best Invitational, Florida Gators Invitational
- 2023 Vystar CU Gators Invitational

== Professional wins (2) ==
=== PGA Tour wins (1) ===
No.	Date	Tournament	Winning score	Margin of victory	Runner-up
1	Mar 8, 2026	Puerto Rico Open	−17 (68-68-68-67=271)	1 stroke	(United States) Chandler Blanchet

=== Korn Ferry Tour wins (1) ===
No.	Date	Tournament	Winning score	Margin of victory	Runners-up
1	Jun 18, 2023	Blue Cross and Blue Shield of Kansas Wichita Open	−19 (67-62-66-66=261)	Playoff	(Belgium) Adrien Dumont de Chassart, (United States) Kyle Jones

Korn Ferry Tour playoff record (1–0)

No.	Year	Tournament	Opponents	Result
1	2023	Blue Cross and Blue Shield of Kansas Wichita Open	(Belgium) Adrien Dumont de Chassart, (United States) Kyle Jones	Won with par on first extra hole

== Results in major championships ==
Tournament	2020	2021	2022	2023	2024	2025	2026
Masters Tournament							
PGA Championship							CUT
U.S. Open	CUT						
The Open Championship	NT						

Did not play

CUT = missed the half-way cut
NT = no tournament due to the COVID-19 pandemic

== Results in The Players Championship ==
Tournament	2025	2026
The Players Championship	CUT	T70

CUT = missed the half-way cut
"T" = tied

== U.S. national team appearances ==
Amateur

- Junior Ryder Cup: 2018 (winners)
- Walker Cup: 2021 (winners)
- Arnold Palmer Cup: 2020, 2021 (winners)

== See also ==
- 2024 Korn Ferry Tour graduates
