= List of International Arnold Palmer Cup golfers =

This is a list of all the International team golfers who have played in the Arnold Palmer Cup through 2025. The Arnold Palmer Cup was known as the Palmer Cup until 2015. Until 2002 the United States played Great Britain & Ireland while from 2003 to 2017 the United States played a European team.

== Players ==
=== Women ===
- (Malaysia) Alyaa Abdulghany 2020
- (Sweden) Kajsa Arwefjäll 2022
- (Slovenia) Ana Belac 2019
- (Spain) Carla Bernat Escuder 2023, 2024, 2025
- (Thailand) Jaravee Boonchant 2018
- (Canada) Vanessa Borovilos 2026
- (Scotland) Penny Brown 2021
- (Denmark) Emma Bunch 2024
- (Republic of Ireland) Sara Byrne 2024
- (France) Adéla Cernousek 2024
- (Thailand) Karisa Chul-ak-sorn 2023
- (Scotland) Hannah Darling 2024
- (Mexico) María Fassi 2018
- (Spain) Cayetana Fernández 2026
- (Mexico) Isabella Fierro 2021
- (Germany) Alexandra Försterling 2022
- (Spain) Paula Francisco 2026
- (Denmark) Karen Fredgaard 2021
- (Sweden) Elice Fredriksson 2025
- (Thailand) Eila Galitsky 2025
- (Paraguay) Sofia García 2019, 2020
- (Sweden) Linn Grant 2020
- (Philippines) Lois Kaye Go 2019
- (China) Sophie Guo 2020
- (Germany) Leonie Harm 2019
- (England) Charlotte Heath 2023
- (Australia) Maddison Hinson-Tolchard 2023
- (South Korea) Jeon Ji-won 2018, 2019
- (Czech Republic) Veronika Kedronova 2026
- (New Zealand) Wenyung Keh 2018
- (Canada) Lauren Kim 2025, 2026
- (Sweden) Frida Kinhult 2019
- (Germany) Aline Krauter 2022
- (France) Agathe Laisné 2019, 2021
- (Republic of Ireland) Kate Lanigan 2024
- (Malaysia) Ashley Lau 2022
- (Taiwan) Heather Lin 2022
- (Sweden) Ingrid Lindblad 2020, 2021
- (Spain) Carolina López-Chacarra 2022, 2025
- (Spain) Julia López Ramírez 2022, 2023, 2024
- (Taiwan) Hsin-Yu Lu 2022
- (South Africa) Caitlyn Macnab 2023, 2024, 2025
- (Denmark) Marie Eline Madsen 2026
- (Philippines) Rianne Malixi 2026
- (Colombia) María José Marín 2024, 2025, 2026
- (Spain) Paula Martín Sampedro 2024, 2026
- (New Zealand) Caitlin Maurice 2026
- (Republic of Ireland) Julie McCarthy 2019
- (Scotland) Lorna McClymont 2019, 2022, 2023
- (England) Caley McGinty 2023
- (Northern Ireland) Olivia Mehaffey 2018, 2020
- (Italy) Benedetta Moresco 2022
- (Australia) Hira Naveed 2019
- (Thailand) Virunpat Olankitkunchai 2021
- (Spain) Ainhoa Olarra 2018
- (Puerto Rico) Janice Olivencia 2025
- (Sweden) Meja Örtengren 2025
- (Thailand) Pimnipa Panthong 2018
- (Spain) Ana Peláez Triviño 2021
- (England) Emily Price 2021
- (Spain) Andrea Revuelta 2025
- (England) Patience Rhodes 2026
- (France) Pauline Roussin-Bouchard 2020, 2021
- (Australia) Gabriela Ruffels 2019, 2020
- (Republic of Ireland) Chloe Ryan 2018
- (Sweden) Louise Rydqvist 2024, 2025
- (Latvia) Marta Silchenko 2026
- (Austria) Emma Spitz 2020, 2021
- (Sweden) Maja Stark 2020
- (Norway) Karoline Stormo 2019
- (Canada) Maddie Szeryk 2018
- (Switzerland) Chiara Tamburlini 2022, 2023
- (Thailand) Patty Tavatanakit 2018
- (South Africa) Kaleigh Telfer 2020
- (Malaysia) Mirabel Ting 2023, 2024, 2025
- (Switzerland) Albane Valenzuela 2018
- (Sweden) Beatrice Wallin 2021
- (Republic of Ireland) Lauren Walsh 2021, 2023
- (Netherlands) Dewi Weber 2018
- (England) Amelia Williamson 2022
- (England) Lottie Woad 2023, 2025
- (China) Angelina Ye 2020

=== Men ===
- (Sweden) Ludvig Åberg 2020, 2022
- (France) Bastien Amat 2024
- (Spain) Pep Anglès 2014, 2015
- (Vietnam) Nguyen Anh Minh 2026
- (Thailand) Puwit Anupansuebsai 2020, 2021
- (Japan) Kengo Aoshima 2019
- (Spain) José Luis Ballester 2022, 2023, 2024
- (South Africa) Daniel Bennett 2025, 2026
- (Sweden) Albin Bergström 2022
- (Brazil) Fred Biondi 2022
- (Sweden) Jonas Blixt 2007, 2008
- (England) Mark Booker 2000
- (Wales) David Boote 2016
- (England) David Booth 2012
- (Scotland) Scott Borrowman 2008
- (Norway) Lars Brovold 2004
- (France) Julien Brun 2012, 2013
- (South Africa) Jack Buchanan 2026
- (Scotland) James Byrne 2010
- (Northern Ireland) Jonathan Caldwell 2008
- (Spain) Jorge Campillo 2007, 2008, 2009
- (Spain) Alejandro Cañizares 2003, 2004, 2005, 2006
- (Scotland) George Cannon 2026
- (Denmark) Sebastian Cappelen 2011, 2012, 2013
- (Netherlands) Rowin Caron 2015
- (Spain) Eugenio Chacarra 2021
- (South Korea) Sam Choi 2020
- (Republic of Ireland) Richie Coughlan 1997
- (Wales) Archie Davies 2022
- (Wales) Rhys Davies 2004, 2005, 2006, 2007
- (Spain) Alejandro del Rey 2019
- (Mexico) Santiago De la Fuente 2023, 2024
- (Belgium) Thomas Detry 2014, 2015
- (China) Ding Wenyi 2024
- (England) Luke Donald 1998, 1999
- (England) Robert Duck 1998
- (Belgium) Adrien Dumont de Chassart 2021, 2022
- (Republic of Ireland) Paul Dunne 2014
- (England) Greg Eason 2013
- (Sweden) Kalle Edberg 2005
- (Norway) Mats Ege 2023
- (Switzerland) Mathias Eggenberger 2015, 2016
- (England) Harry Ellis 2017
- (England) Jamie Elson 2000, 2001
- (Spain) Nacho Elvira 2011
- (Sweden) Jonas Enander-Hedin 2008
- (Wales) Rhys Enoch 2010
- (Spain) Pablo Ereño 2025
- (Spain) Scott Fernández 2013
- (Spain) Gonzalo Fernández-Castaño 2003, 2004
- (Argentina) Mateo Fernández de Oliveira 2022, 2023
- (Portugal) Pedro Figueiredo 2013
- (England) Alex Fitzpatrick 2020, 2021
- (England) Angus Flanagan 2020
- (Sweden) Nils Florén 2011
- (Sweden) Oscar Florén 2006, 2007
- (England) Charlie Ford 2008
- (England) Charlie Forster 2025
- (Scotland) Grant Forrest 2014
- (Northern Ireland) Johnny Foster 1999
- (Scotland) Rory Franssen 2017
- (Costa Rica) Luis Gagne 2018, 2019
- (Portugal) Ricardo Gouveia 2014
- (Scotland) Connor Graham 2025, 2026
- (Republic of Ireland) Stuart Grehan 2016, 2017
- (Wales) Aled Greville 2019
- (Republic of Ireland) Ryan Griffin 2023
- (Germany) Stephan Gross 2009
- (Republic of Ireland) Ryan Griffin 2024
- (Denmark) Mark Haastrup 2006, 2007
- (England) Harry Hall 2017, 2018
- (England) Geoff Harris 2002
- (England) Max Harris 1998, 1999, 2000
- (Cayman Islands) Justin Hastings 2025
- (Scotland) Joel Hendry 2000
- (Republic of Ireland) Allan Hill 2021
- (Northern Ireland) Michael Hoey 1999
- (England) Sam Horsfield 2016
- (Norway) Viktor Hovland 2017, 2018
- (Netherlands) Daan Huizing 2012
- (Republic of Ireland) Gary Hurley 2013, 2015
- (Scotland) David Inglis 2001, 2003
- (Czech Republic) Filip Jakubcik 2024, 2025
- (Scotland) Scott Jamieson 2005
- (China) Jin Bo 2021
- (Japan) Takumi Kanaya 2019
- (Sweden) Jeff Karlsson 2011
- (Sweden) Robert S. Karlsson 2011, 2012
- (Republic of Ireland) Justin Kehoe 2001, 2002
- (Republic of Ireland) Max Kennedy 2023, 2024
- (Sweden) Jesper Kennegård 2010
- (Republic of Ireland) David Kitt 2022
- (Denmark) Frederik Kjettrup 2022, 2023
- (South Africa) Christo Lamprecht 2022, 2023
- (Scotland) Andrew Laurence 1997
- (Republic of Ireland) Peter Lawrie 1997
- (Thailand) Phichaksn Maichon, 2025
- (England) Martin Le Mesurier 1997
- (Scotland) Ross Laird 2025
- (Singapore) James Leow 2022
- (England) Steve Lewton 2006
- (Thailand) K. K. Limbhasut 2018
- (China) Lin Yuxin 2020, 2021
- (Scotland) Oliver Lindsay 1998, 1999
- (Sweden) David Lingmerth 2010
- (Germany) Hurly Long 2018
- (Netherlands) Joost Luiten 2006
- (South Africa) Christiaan Maas 2023
- (Scotland) Nick Macandrew 2011
- (Scotland) Allan MacDonald 1997
- (Thailand) Phichaksn Maichon 2024
- (England) Graeme Maly 1998
- (Wales) Stuart Manley 2002
- (England) Richard Mansell 2017
- (Spain) Pablo Martín 2005, 2006
- (Northern Ireland) Gareth Maybin 2004
- (Italy) Stefano Mazzoli 2018
- (Scotland) Jack McDonald 2014
- (Northern Ireland) Graeme McDowell 2000, 2001
- (Poland) Adrian Meronk 2015, 2016
- (Norway) Michael Mjaaseth 2025
- (Italy) Francesco Molinari 2004
- (Mexico) Omar Morales 2024
- (Italy) Leonardo Motta 2009
- (Republic of Ireland) Ronan Mullarney 2018
- (Japan) Keita Nakajima 2019
- (Denmark) Rasmus Neergaard-Petersen 2022
- (Sweden) Fredrik Niléhn 2017, 2018
- (Sweden) Pär Nilsson 2003
- (Republic of Ireland) Keith Nolan 1997
- (Sweden) Alex Norén 2004, 2005
- (Sweden) Henrik Norlander 2009, 2010, 2011
- (Sweden) Vincent Norrman 2020
- (Sweden) David Nyfjäll 2019
- (Sweden) Pontus Nyholm 2021
- (Sweden) Erik Oja 2014
- (Denmark) Jacob Skov Olesen 2024
- (Spain) Pedro Oriol 2007
- (Mexico) Álvaro Ortiz 2018
- (England) Joe Pagdin 2021
- (England) Chris Paisley 2009
- (Guatemala) Gabriel Palacios 2025
- (Italy) Andrea Pavan 2009, 2010
- (France) Adrien Pendaries 2020
- (Peru) Julián Périco 2021
- (Sweden) Robin Petersson 2016
- (Republic of Ireland) Kevin Phelan 2013
- (Thailand) Peng Pichaikool 2019
- (Belgium) Thomas Pieters 2012
- (South Africa) Malan Potgieter 2026
- (England) Luke Poulter 2025, 2026
- (Republic of Ireland) Mark Power 2020
- (Wales) David Price 2003
- (Wales) Oliver Pughe 1998
- (Spain) David Puig 2020, 2021
- (Republic of Ireland) Caolan Rafferty 2020
- (Spain) Jon Rahm 2014, 2015
- (Colombia) Iván Ramírez 2019
- (Scotland) Richie Ramsay 2006
- (South Africa) Jovan Rebula 2018
- (Scotland) Graeme Robertson 2012
- (England) Simon Robinson 2000
- (Switzerland) Martin Rominger 2004
- (Sweden) Hannes Rönneblad 2017
- (Scotland) James Ross 2014
- (Germany) Max Rottluff 2015
- (England) Phil Rowe 1999, 2000, 2001, 2002
- (France) Antoine Rozner 2016
- (England) Rory Sabbatini 1998
- (Italy) Lorenzo Scalise 2018
- (Sweden) Wilhelm Schauman 2003
- (Germany) Matti Schmid 2019, 2020
- (Austria) Matthias Schwab 2015, 2016
- (France) Robin Sciot-Siegrist 2016
- (Scotland) Calum Scott 2024
- (Scotland) Sandy Scott 2019
- (Norway) Herman Wibe Sekne 2023
- (Northern Ireland) Gareth Shaw 2007, 2008
- (Scotland) Niall Sheils Donegan 2026
- (England) David Skinns 2003, 2005
- (Netherlands) Tim Sluiter 2008, 2009
- (South Africa) Tyran Snyders 2023
- (England) Andy Smith 2002
- (France) Clément Sordet 2015
- (England) Patrick Spraggs 2010
- (France) Joël Stalter 2013
- (Republic of Ireland) Neil Steven 1997
- (Wales) Kyron Sullivan 1998, 1999, 2000, 2001
- (Iceland) Árni Sveinsson 2025, 2026
- (New Zealand) Zack Swanwick 2026
- (Australia) Harry Takis 2026
- (England) Ben Taylor 2013
- (England) Steven Tiley 2005
- (England) Louis Tomlinson 2014
- (Sweden) Hugo Townsend 2021
- (Netherlands) Lars van Meijel 2016
- (South Africa) Ben van Wyk 2024
- (Norway) Kristoffer Ventura 2017
- (England) Justin Walters 2002
- (England) Tyler Weaver 2025
- (England) Andrew White 1997, 1999
- (England) David Wicks 2017
- (Sweden) Pontus Widegren 2010, 2011, 2012, 2013
- (Germany) Tim Wiedemeyer 2026
- (England) Oliver Wilson 2001, 2002, 2003
- (Scotland) Stuart Wilson 2001, 2002
- (Sweden) Robin Wingårdh 2009
- (Scotland) Gordon Yates 2007
- (Taiwan) Kevin Yu 2019
- (China) Andy Zhang 2018
- (China) Sampson-Yunhe Zheng 2023

== See also ==
- List of American Arnold Palmer Cup golfers
- Lists of golfers
