= 2017 in golf =

This article summarizes the highlights of professional and amateur golf in the year 2017.

== Men's professional golf ==
=== Major championships ===
- 6–9 April: The Masters – Sergio García won in a playoff over Justin Rose. It was his first major championship.
- 15–18 June: U.S. Open – Brooks Koepka won by four strokes over Brian Harman and Hideki Matsuyama. It was his first major championship victory. He tied the U.S. Open record of 16 strokes under par.
- 20–23 July: The Open Championship – Jordan Spieth won by three strokes over Matt Kuchar. It was his first Open Championship victory, and his third major championship. It is also the third different major he has won, having previously won the Masters and the U.S. Open.
- 10–13 August: PGA Championship – Justin Thomas won by two strokes over Francesco Molinari, Louis Oosthuizen, and Patrick Reed. It was his first major championship.

=== World Golf Championships ===
- 2–5 March WGC-Mexico Championship – Dustin Johnson won by one stroke over Tommy Fleetwood. It was the second time he won this particular WGC event, and the fourth time he won any WGC event.
- 22–26 March: WGC-Dell Technologies Match Play – Dustin Johnson defeated Jon Rahm, 1 up, in the championship match. It was the first time he won the Match Play event, and the fifth time he has won any WGC event. He became the first player to win all four active WGC events.
- 3–6 August: WGC-Bridgestone Invitational – Hideki Matsuyama won by five strokes over Zach Johnson. It was his first WGC-Bridgestone Invitational championship, and his second WGC championship overall.
- 26–29 October: WGC-HSBC Champions – Justin Rose won by two strokes over Dustin Johnson, Brooks Koepka, and Henrik Stenson. It was his first WGC-HSBC Champions victory, and his second WGC victory overall.

=== FedEx Cup playoff events ===
- 24–27 August: The Northern Trust – Dustin Johnson won in a playoff over Jordan Spieth.
- 1–4 September: Dell Technologies Championship – Justin Thomas won by three strokes over Spieth.
- 14–17 September: BMW Championship – Marc Leishman won by five strokes over Rickie Fowler and Justin Rose.
- 21–24 September: Tour Championship – Xander Schauffele won by one shot over Justin Thomas, whose second-place finish gave him the FedEx Cup.

=== Other leading PGA Tour events ===
- 11–14 May: The Players Championship – Kim Si-woo won by three strokes over Louis Oosthuizen and Ian Poulter.

For a complete list of PGA Tour results see 2017 PGA Tour.

=== Leading European Tour events ===
- 25–28 May: BMW PGA Championship – Alex Norén shot a final-round 62 to win by two strokes.
- 16–19 November: DP World Tour Championship, Dubai – Jon Rahm won the tournament by one shot, while Tommy Fleetwood won his first Race to Dubai title.

For a complete list of European Tour results see 2017 European Tour.

=== Team events ===
- 28 September – 1 October: Presidents Cup – The U.S. team won, 19–11, for the seventh straight time.

=== Tour leaders ===
- PGA Tour - (United States) Justin Thomas (US$9,921,560)
  - This total does not include FedEx Cup bonuses.
- European Tour – (England) Tommy Fleetwood (5,420,530 points)
- Japan Golf Tour – Yūsaku Miyazato (¥182,831,982)
- Asian Tour – (Malaysia) Gavin Green (US$585,813)
- Korean Tour – (South Korea) Kim Seung-hyuk (₩631,779,810)
- PGA Tour of Australasia – (Australia) Brett Rumford (A$313,094)
- Sunshine Tour – (South Africa) George Coetzee (R 2,937,226) – 2017–18 season
- OneAsia Tour – (South Korea) Chang Yi-keun (US$270,303)
- PGA Tour Latinoamérica – (Mexico) José de Jesús Rodríguez (US$119,001)

=== Awards ===
- PGA Tour
  - FedEx Cup – (United States) Justin Thomas
  - PGA Player of the Year – (United States) Justin Thomas
  - Player of the Year (Jack Nicklaus Trophy) – (United States) Justin Thomas
  - Leading money winner (Arnold Palmer Award) – (United States) Justin Thomas
  - Vardon Trophy – (United States) Jordan Spieth
  - Byron Nelson Award – (United States) Jordan Spieth
  - Rookie of the Year – (United States) Xander Schauffele
  - Payne Stewart Award – (United States) Stewart Cink
- European Tour
  - Golfer of the Year – (Spain) Sergio García
  - Rookie of the Year – (Spain) Jon Rahm
- Web.com Tour
  - Player of the Year – (United States) Chesson Hadley

=== Results from other tours ===
- 2017 Asian Tour
- 2017 PGA Tour of Australasia
- 2017 PGA Tour Canada
- 2017 Challenge Tour
- 2017 Japan Golf Tour
- 2017 OneAsia Tour
- 2017 PGA Tour Latinoamérica
- 2017–18 Sunshine Tour
- 2017 Web.com Tour

=== Other happenings ===
- 19 February: Dustin Johnson became the number one golfer in the world.
- 14 March: The Honourable Company of Edinburgh Golfers, owners and operators of Muirfield, voted overwhelmingly to admit women to the club for the first time. The R&A responded by reinstating Muirfield as a venue for The Open Championship. The club had been removed from the rotation in 2016 after voting against admitting women.
- 8 August: The PGA of America and the PGA Tour jointly announced that beginning in 2019, the PGA Championship would move from August to May, and The Players Championship would move from May to March.
- 23 August: Augusta National Golf Club, operator of the Masters Tournament, announced that Billy Payne, who had served as club chairman since October 2006, would retire effective with the start of the club's next season on October 16. Payne's replacement is Fred Ridley, a past president of the USGA.

== Women's professional golf ==
=== LPGA majors ===
- 30 March – 2 April: ANA Inspiration – Ryu So-yeon won in a playoff over Lexi Thompson. It was her first ANA Inspiration championship, and her second major championship.
- 29 June – 2 July: KPMG Women's PGA Championship – Danielle Kang won her first professional tournament by one stroke over defending champion Brooke Henderson.
- 13–16 July: U.S. Women's Open – Park Sung-hyun won the tournament by two strokes over amateur Choi Hye-jin. It was her first major victory.
- 3–6 August: Women's British Open – In-Kyung Kim won her first major, beating Jodi Ewart Shadoff by two strokes.
- 14–17 September: The Evian Championship – Anna Nordqvist beat Brittany Altomare in a sudden-death playoff, for her second major. The event was reduced to 54 holes after the first day's play was abandoned because of bad weather.

For a complete list of LPGA Tour results, see 2017 LPGA Tour.

=== Additional LPGA Tour events ===
- 16–19 November: CME Group Tour Championship – Ariya Jutanugarn won the tournament by one stroke, while Lexi Thompson clinched Race to the CME Globe title.

=== Ladies European Tour event ===
- 6–9 December: Omega Dubai Ladies Masters – Angel Yin won in a playoff over Céline Herbin and In-Kyung Kim.

For a complete list of Ladies European Tour results see 2017 Ladies European Tour.

=== Legends Tour event ===
- 10–12 July: Senior LPGA Championship – Trish Johnson won by three strokes over Michele Redman.

=== Team events ===
- 18–20 August: Solheim Cup – Team USA won the Cup with a 16½–11½ victory over Team Europe.

=== Money list leaders ===
- LPGA Tour – (South Korea) Park Sung-hyun (US$2,335,883)
- LPGA of Japan Tour – Ai Suzuki (¥140,122,631)
- Ladies European Tour – (England) Georgia Hall (€368,935)
- LPGA of Korea Tour – (South Korea) Lee Jeong-eun (₩1,149,052,534)
- Ladies Asian Golf Tour – (Thailand) Pannarat Thanapolboonyaras (US$13,216)
- ALPG Tour – (Australia) Sarah Jane Smith (A$97,245, 2016/17 season)
- Symetra Tour – (Thailand) Benyapa Niphatsophon (US$124,492)

=== Awards ===
- LPGA Tour Player of the Year – (South Korea) Ryu So-yeon and (South Korea) Park Sung-hyun
- LPGA Tour Rookie of the Year – (South Korea) Park Sung-hyun
- LPGA Tour Vare Trophy – (United States) Lexi Thompson
- LET Player of the Year – (England) Georgia Hall
- LET Rookie of the Year – (France) Camille Chevalier
- LPGA of Japan Tour Player of the Year – Ai Suzuki

=== Other tour results ===
- 2017 ALPG Tour
- 2017 China LPGA Tour
- 2017 Ladies Asian Golf Tour
- 2017 Legends Tour
- 2017 LPGA of Japan Tour
- 2017 LPGA of Korea Tour
- 2017 Symetra Tour

=== Other happenings ===
- 12 June: Ariya Jutanugarn rises to number one in the Women's World Golf Rankings after winning the Manulife LPGA Classic, ending Lydia Ko's run of 85 weeks at number one.
- 26 June: Ryu So-yeon rises to number one in the Women's World Golf Rankings after winning the Walmart NW Arkansas Championship, ending Jutanugarn's two weeks at number one.
- 6 November: Park Sung-hyun rises to number one in the Women's World Golf Rankings.
- 13 November: Shanshan Feng rises to number one in the Women's World Golf Rankings after winning the Blue Bay LPGA.

== Senior men's professional golf ==
=== Senior majors ===
- 18–21 May: Regions Tradition – Bernhard Langer won his second consecutive Tradition and eighth senior major, tying Jack Nicklaus for most senior major victories.
- 25–28 May: Senior PGA Championship – Langer won, completing the senior grand slam and passing Nicklaus with his ninth senior major victory.
- 29 June – 2 July: U.S. Senior Open – Kenny Perry won his second U.S. Senior Open and fourth senior major.
- 13–16 July: Senior Players Championship – Scott McCarron won his first senor major by one stroke over Brandt Jobe and Langer.
- 27–30 July: The Senior Open Championship – Langer won his third Senior Open by three strokes over Corey Pavin.

=== Charles Schwab Cup playoff events ===
- 20–22 October: Dominion Charity Classic – Bernhard Langer won by one stroke over Scott Verplank.
- 27–29 October: PowerShares QQQ Championship – Bernhard Langer won on the second playoff hole over Miguel Ángel Jiménez.
- 9–12 November: Charles Schwab Cup Championship – Kevin Sutherland won by one stroke over Vijay Singh and Lee Janzen, also winning the Charles Schwab Cup.

=== Full results ===
- 2017 PGA Tour Champions season
- 2017 European Senior Tour

=== Money list leaders ===
- PGA Tour Champions – (Germany) Bernhard Langer (US$3,677,359)
- European Senior Tour – (United States) Clark Dennis (€222,055)

=== Awards ===
- PGA Tour Champions
  - Charles Schwab Cup – (United States) Kevin Sutherland
  - Leading money winner (Arnold Palmer Award) – (Germany) Bernhard Langer
  - Lowest stroke average (Byron Nelson Award) – (Germany) Bernhard Langer

== Amateur golf ==
- 19–24 May: NCAA Division I Women's Golf Championships – Arizona State won its eighth team title and Monica Vaughn (Arizona State) took the individual title.
- 26–31 May: NCAA Division I Men's Golf Championships – Oklahoma defeated defending champion Oregon for its second team title and Braden Thornberry (Ole Miss) won the individual title.
- 13−17 June: British Ladies Amateur Golf Championship – Leona Maguire defeated Ainhoa Olarra, 3 and 2, in the final.
- 19–24 June: The Amateur Championship – Harry Ellis defeated Dylan Perry on the 38th hole.
- 7–13 August: U.S. Women's Amateur – Sophia Schubert defeated Albane Valenzuela 6 & 5 in the championship match.
- 14–20 August: U.S. Amateur – Doc Redman defeated Doug Ghim in 37 holes, in the final.
- 9–10 September: Walker Cup – The United States team won, 19–7.
- 26–29 October: Asia-Pacific Amateur Championship – Lin Yuxin of China defeated countryman Andy Zhang by three strokes.

Other happenings

- 15 March: Curtis Luck takes over the men's World Amateur Golf Ranking from Maverick McNealy, they swap the title over the next two months.
- 17 May: Joaquín Niemann takes over the men's World Amateur Golf Ranking from McNealy.

== Golf in multi-sport events ==
- 27–30 June: Island Games – Isle of Man took the men's team and individual golds while Åland took the women's individual and Gotland took the women's team.
- 22–26 August: Southeast Asian Games – Kosuke Hamamoto and Atthaya Thitikul, both of Thailand, took the individual gold medals in the men's and women's events, respectively. Singapore won the men's team gold medal and Thailand took the women's.
- 24–27 August: Summer Universiade – Raul Pereda de la Huerta of Mexico and Mariel Galdiano of the United States took the individual men's and women's gold medals, respectively. Japan and the United States took the team men's and women's gold medals, respectively.

== Other headlines ==
- 11 December: The USGA and R&A jointly announced two significant changes to the Rules of Golf:
  - From 1 January 2018, video review protocols would be changed by means of a "Local Rule" to be followed by all major golf tours. All televised tournaments would dedicate at least one official to monitor the event's TV coverage to handle rules issues. Viewer feedback on potential rules violations would no longer be accepted, and the only acceptable source of video evidence of rules violations would be the event's broadcast partner(s).
  - Also from 1 January 2018, another Local Rule removes the 2-stroke penalty for signing an incorrect scorecard in cases when the golfer was not notified of a rules violation at the time of signing. From 1 January 2019, the penalty for signing an incorrect scorecard will be completely removed from the Rules of Golf.

== Deaths ==
- 4 January – Wayne Westner (born 1961), South African golfer who won twice on the European Tour.
- 13 January – John Jacobs (born 1925), Ryder Cup player and captain, founder of European Tour, and World Golf Hall of Fame member.
- 27 January – Betty Stanhope-Cole (born 1937), Canadian amateur golf and member of the Canadian Golf Hall of Fame.
- 2 March – Simon Hobday (born 1940), South African golfer who won the 1994 U.S. Senior Open.
- 15 March – Jackie Pung (born 1921), American golfer who won the 1952 U.S. Women's Amateur and five times on the LPGA Tour.
- 19 March – Ken Still (born 1935), American golfer who won three times on the PGA Tour.
- 20 March – John Paul Cain (born 1936), American golfer who won twice on the Senior PGA Tour.
- 10 April – Al Besselink (born 1923), American golfer who had five PGA Tour wins.
- 1 June – Roberto De Vicenzo (born 1923), Argentine golfer who won the 1967 Open Championship and World Golf Hall of Fame member.
- 3 June – Vincent Tshabalala (born 1942), South African golfer who won the 1976 French Open.
- 22 June – Sandy Tatum (born 1920), American amateur golfer and former United States Golf Association president.
- 7 September – Charles Owens (born 1932), American golfer who won two Senior PGA Tour events.
- 9 September – Doug Sewell (born 1929), English professional golfer.
- 7 December – Tommy Horton (born 1941), English golfer who won four times on the European Tour and 23 times on the European Seniors Tour.
- 17 December – Al Kelley (born 1935), American golfer who won one Senior PGA Tour event.

== Table of results ==
This table summarizes all the results referred to above in date order.

Dates	Tournament	Status or tour	Winner
2–5 Mar	WGC-Mexico Championship	World Golf Championships	(United States) Dustin Johnson
22–26 Mar	WGC-Dell Technologies Match Play	World Golf Championships	(United States) Dustin Johnson
30 Mar – 2 Apr	ANA Inspiration	LPGA major	(South Korea) Ryu So-yeon
6–9 Apr	Masters Tournament	Men's major	(Spain) Sergio García
11–14 May	The Players Championship	PGA Tour	(South Korea) Kim Si-woo
18–21 May	Regions Tradition	Senior major	(Germany) Bernhard Langer
19–24 May	NCAA Division I Women's Golf Championships	U.S. college championship	Arizona State / Monica Vaughn
25–28 May	BMW PGA Championship	European Tour	(Sweden) Alex Norén
25–28 May	Senior PGA Championship	Senior major	(Germany) Bernhard Langer
26–31 May	NCAA Division I Men's Golf Championships	U.S. college championship	Oklahoma / Braden Thornberry
13−17 Jun	British Ladies Amateur	Amateur women's individual tournament	(Republic of Ireland) Leona Maguire
15–18 Jun	U.S. Open	Men's major	(United States) Brooks Koepka
19–24 Jun	The Amateur Championship	Amateur men's individual tournament	(England) Harry Ellis
29 Jun – 2 Jul	U.S. Senior Open	Senior major	(United States) Kenny Perry
29 Jun – 2 Jul	KPMG Women's PGA Championship	LPGA major	(United States) Danielle Kang
10–12 Jul	Senior LPGA Championship	Legends Tour tournament	(England) Trish Johnson
13–16 Jul	Constellation Senior Players Championship	Senior major	(United States) Scott McCarron
13–16 Jul	U.S. Women's Open	LPGA major	(South Korea) Park Sung-hyun
20–23 Jul	The Open Championship	Men's major	(United States) Jordan Spieth
27–30 Jul	The Senior Open Championship	Senior major	(Germany) Bernhard Langer
3–6 Aug	Ricoh Women's British Open	LPGA Tour and Ladies European Tour major	(South Korea) In-Kyung Kim
3–6 Aug	WGC-Bridgestone Invitational	World Golf Championships	(Japan) Hideki Matsuyama
10–13 Aug	PGA Championship	Men's major	(United States) Justin Thomas
7–13 Aug	U.S. Women's Amateur	Amateur women's individual tournament	(United States) Sophia Schubert
14–20 Aug	U.S. Amateur	Amateur men's individual tournament	(United States) Doc Redman
18–20 Aug	Solheim Cup	Europe v United States women's professional team event	United States
24–27 Aug	The Northern Trust	PGA Tour FedEx Cup playoff	(United States) Dustin Johnson
1–4 Sep	Dell Technologies Championship	PGA Tour FedEx Cup playoff	(United States) Justin Thomas
9–10 Sep	Walker Cup	Great Britain & Ireland v United States men's amateur team event	United States
14–17 Sep	The Evian Championship	LPGA Tour and Ladies European Tour major	(Sweden) Anna Nordqvist
14–17 Sep	BMW Championship	PGA Tour FedEx Cup playoff	(Australia) Marc Leishman
21–24 Sep	The Tour Championship	PGA Tour FedEx Cup playoff	(United States) Xander Schauffele
28 Sep – 1 Oct	Presidents Cup	International team vs. United States team men's professional team event	(United States) U.S. team
20–22 Oct	Dominion Charity Classic	PGA Tour Champions Charles Schwab Cup playoff	(Germany) Bernhard Langer
26–29 Oct	Asia-Pacific Amateur Championship	Amateur men's individual tournament	(China) Lin Yuxin
26–29 Oct	WGC-HSBC Champions	World Golf Championships	(England) Justin Rose
26–29 Oct	PowerShares QQQ Championship	PGA Tour Champions Charles Schwab Cup playoff	(Germany) Bernhard Langer
9–12 Nov	Charles Schwab Cup Championship	PGA Tour Champions Charles Schwab Cup playoff	(United States) Kevin Sutherland
16–19 Nov	DP World Tour Championship, Dubai	European Tour	(Spain) Jon Rahm
16–19 Nov	CME Group Tour Championship	LPGA Tour	(Thailand) Ariya Jutanugarn
