= Golf at the 2019 Pan American Games – Mixed team =

Mixed team at the 2019 Pan American Games
- Venue: Country Club Villa
- Start date: August 8, 2019
- End date: August 11, 2019
- Competitors: 57 from 15 nations
- Winning score: 544 (−24)

Medalists
Gold medal	Brandon Wu; Stewart Hagestad; Emilia Migliaccio; Rose Zhang	United States
Silver medal	Fabrizio Zanotti; Carlos Franco; Julieta Granada; Sofia García	Paraguay
Bronze medal	Austin Connelly; Joey Savoie; Mary Parsons; Brigitte Thibault	Canada

The mixed team competition of the Golf events at the 2019 Pan American Games was held between August 8 and 11 at the Country Club Villa in Lima, Peru. The team score for each round was the sum of the low men's score and the low women's score.

The all-amateur team from the United States won the gold medal by five strokes over Paraguay.

== Schedule ==
All times are PET (UTC−5).

Date	Time	Round
August 8, 2019	8:00	Round 1
August 9, 2019	8:00	Round 2
August 10, 2019	8:00	Round 3
August 11, 2019	8:00	Round 4

== Results ==
The final results were:

Rank	Nation	Name	Round 1	Round 2	Round 3	Round 4	Total
1st place, gold medalist(s)	United States	Brandon Wu (M-a); Stewart Hagestad (M-a); Emilia Migliaccio (W-a); Rose Zhang (W-a)	134; 64; 65; 70; 72	133; 65; 73; 68; 76	138; 70; 70; 68; 72	139; 71; 70; 70; 69	544 (−24)
2nd place, silver medalist(s)	Paraguay	Fabrizio Zanotti (M); Carlos Franco (M); Julieta Granada (W); Sofia García (W-a)	134; 64; 71; 70; 74	138; 67; 69; 71; 71	139; 68; 71; 71; 71	138; 70; 72; 68; 72	549 (−19)
3rd place, bronze medalist(s)	Canada	Austin Connelly (M); Joey Savoie (M-a); Mary Parsons (W-a); Brigitte Thibault (W-a)	137; 69; 70; 68; 74	144; 71; 75; 73; 73	133; 65; 76; 75; 68	138; 68; 73; 70; 75	552 (−16)
4	Colombia	Santiago Gómez (M); Ricardo Celia (M); Paula Hurtado-Restrepo (W); Paola Moreno (W)	141; 70; 72; 71; 71	142; 70; 71; 72; 73	139; 69; 75; 70; 74	135; 67; 70; 68; 72	557 (−11)
5	Guatemala	José Toledo (M); Daniel Gurtner (M-a); Pilar Echeverria (W-a); Valeria Mendizabal (W-a)	139; 69; 68; 71; 75	146; 68; 70; 78; 78	138; 68; 73; 70; 71	135; 64; 69; 73; 71	558 (−10)
T6	Argentina	Miguel Ángel Carballo (M); Estanislao Goya (M); Ela Belen Anacona (W-a); Manuela Carbajo Re (W)	138; 68; 70; 76; 70	139; 65; 70; 74; 79	140; 71; 72; 69; 73	142; 70; 67; 75; 81	559 (−9)
T6	Venezuela	Manuel Torres (M); Wolmer Murillo (M); Valentina Gilly (W-a); Vanessa Gilly (W-a)	139; 72; 70; 71; 69	137; 65; 70; 72; 76	142; 70; 70; 72; 75	141; 69; 69; 72; 77	559 (−9)
T8	Mexico	Raúl Cortes (M); Gonzalo Rubio (M); Alejandra Llaneza (W); Ana Isabel González Cantú (W-a)	143; 72; 80; 71; 72	137; 67; 70; 70; 73	140; 67; 67; 73; 74	141; 71; 71; 70; 71	561 (−7)
T8	Chile	Mito Pereira (M); Felipe Aguilar (M); Antonia Matte I (W-a); Natalia Villavicencio (W-a)	138; 67; 76; 79; 71	138; 67; 74; 71; 80	145; 69; 72; 76; 78	140; 66; 75; 74; 76	561 (−7)
10	Peru	Luis Fernando Barco (M); Julián Périco (M-a); Micaela D. Faraha (W-a); María Palacios Siegenthaler (W)	140; 67; 70; 73; 75	141; 68; 73; 73; 77	142; 68; 66; 76; 78	141; 69; 67; 74; 77	564 (−4)
11	Uruguay	Juan Álvarez (M); Facundo Alvarez (M-a); Sofia Garcia Austt (W-a); Jimena Marques Vazquez (W-a)	143; 70; 70; 73; 73	143; 72; 71; 72; 73	138; 67; 77; 71; 78	141; 67; 73; 75; 74	565 (−3)
12	Brazil	Alexandre Rocha (M); Adilson da Silva (M); Nina Rissi Miozzo (W-a); Luiza Altmann (W)	142; 70; 75; 72; 76	141; 69; 71; 72; 79	145; 73; 71; 77; 74	140; 67; 67; 75; 73	568 (E)
13	Dominican Republic	Guillermo Pumarol (M); Juan Jose Guerra (M-a); Rachel Kuehn (W-a)	145; 73; 72; 73	140; 69; 70; 71	144; 69; 72; 75	142; 68; 72; 74	571 (+3)
14	Ecuador	José Miranda (M); Mercedes Solange Gómez (W-a); María B. Arízaga (W-a)	149; 71; 78; 79	149; 74; 75; 77	146; 73; 75; 73	150; 75; 76; 75	594 (+26)
15	Panama	Jean Louis Ducruet (M); Michael Mendez (M); Laura Restrepo (W)	149; 71; 73; 78	148; 76; 76; 72	148; 74; 72; 76	150; 76; 81; 74	595 (+27)

M = men, W = women, a = amateur
