= 2020 Masters Tournament =

- Front cover of the 2020 Masters Journal depicting Augusta National in the fall

Tournament information
- Dates: November 12–15, 2020
- Location: Augusta, Georgia, U.S. 33.503°N 82.020°W
- Course: Augusta National Golf Club
- Tours: PGA Tour; European Tour; Japan Golf Tour

Statistics
- Par: 72
- Length: 7,475 yards (6,835 m)
- Field: 92 players, 60 after cut
- Cut: 144 (E)
- Prize fund: $11,500,000
- Winner's share: $2,070,000

Champion
- (United States) Dustin Johnson
- 268 (−20)
- Location in the United States Location in Georgia

The 2020 Masters Tournament was the 84th edition of the Masters Tournament held at Augusta National Golf Club in Augusta, Georgia.

The golf tournament was originally scheduled for April 9–12, 2020, but it was postponed due to the COVID-19 pandemic. On April 6, Augusta National announced the tournament was rescheduled for November 12–15 and on August 12, the golf club announced that the tournament would be held without spectators in attendance.

Dustin Johnson won the tournament with a record score of 268, 20-under-par, five strokes ahead of Im Sung-jae and Cameron Smith.

== Course ==
Hole	Name	Yards	Par	Hole	Name	Yards	Par
1	Tea Olive	445	4	10	Camellia	495	4
2	Pink Dogwood	575	5	11	White Dogwood	505	4
3	Flowering Peach	350	4	12	Golden Bell	155	3
4	Flowering Crab Apple	240	3	13	Azalea	510	5
5	Magnolia	495	4	14	Chinese Fir	440	4
6	Juniper	180	3	15	Firethorn	530	5
7	Pampas	450	4	16	Redbud	170	3
8	Yellow Jasmine	570	5	17	Nandina	440	4
9	Carolina Cherry	460	4	18	Holly	465	4
Out		3,765	36	In		3,710	36
Source:				Total		7,475	72

== Field ==
The Masters has the smallest field of the four major championships. Officially, the Masters remains an invitation event, but there is a set of qualifying criteria that determines who is included in the field. Each player is classified according to the first category by which he qualified, with other categories in which he qualified shown in parentheses.

Golfers who qualify based solely on their performance in amateur tournaments (categories 7–11) must remain amateurs on the original starting day (April 9) of the tournament to be eligible to play.

1. Past Masters Champions

Fred Couples, Zach Johnson (3), Bernhard Langer, Sandy Lyle, Phil Mickelson, Larry Mize, José María Olazábal, Patrick Reed (16,17,18,19), Charl Schwartzel, Adam Scott (16,17,18,19), Vijay Singh, Jordan Spieth (2,3,15,18), Bubba Watson (12,18), Mike Weir, Danny Willett (18,19), Tiger Woods (12,16,18,19)

- Sergio García (18,19) did not play after testing positive for COVID-19.
- Past champions who did not play: Tommy Aaron, Jack Burke Jr., Ángel Cabrera, Charles Coody, Ben Crenshaw, Nick Faldo, Raymond Floyd, Bob Goalby, Trevor Immelman, Jack Nicklaus, Mark O'Meara, Gary Player, Craig Stadler, Tom Watson, Ian Woosnam, Fuzzy Zoeller.

2. Winners of the U.S. Open in the last five years

Dustin Johnson (12,15,17,18,19), Brooks Koepka (4,12,13,14,15,16,17,18,19), Gary Woodland (13,16,17,18,19)

3. Winners of The Open Championship in the last five years

Shane Lowry (14,18,19), Francesco Molinari (12,18,19), Henrik Stenson (18,19)

4. Winners of the PGA Championship in the last five years

Jason Day (12,18), Justin Thomas (12,16,17,18,19), Jimmy Walker

5. Winners of The Players Championship in the last three years

Kim Si-woo, Rory McIlroy (16,17,18,19), Webb Simpson (12,16,17,18,19)

6. Gold medalist in the Olympic Games (Note: Invitations in this category are only issued for the Masters Tournament immediately following the Olympic Games; as such there was no qualifying invitee in 2020.)

7. Winner and runner-up in the 2019 U.S. Amateur

John Augenstein (a), Andy Ogletree (a)

8. Winner of the 2019 Amateur Championship

James Sugrue (a)

9. Winner of the 2019 Asia-Pacific Amateur Championship

Lin Yuxin (a)

10. Winner of the 2020 Latin America Amateur Championship

Abel Gallegos (a)

11. Winner of the 2019 U.S. Mid-Amateur

Lukas Michel (a)

12. The top 12 finishers and ties in the 2019 Masters Tournament

Patrick Cantlay (15,16,17,18,19), Tony Finau (14,17,18,19), Rickie Fowler (17,18,19), Justin Harding, Matt Kuchar (17,18,19), Ian Poulter (18), Jon Rahm (13,17,18,19), Xander Schauffele (13,17,18,19)

13. Top 4 finishers and ties in the 2019 U.S. Open

Chez Reavie (16,17,18,19), Justin Rose (17,18,19)

14. Top 4 finishers and ties in the 2019 Open Championship

Tommy Fleetwood (17,18,19), Lee Westwood (19)

15. Top 4 finishers and ties in the 2019 PGA Championship

Matt Wallace (18,19)

16. Winners of PGA Tour events that award a full-point allocation for the FedEx Cup, between the 2019 Masters Tournament and March 9, 2020 (Note: Typically, the rule is between the Masters Tournaments. However, for 2020, it was based on the last completed tournament before the PGA Tour was suspended after the COVID-19 pandemic on March 12, 2020. Winners of PGA Tour events that occurred once the season resumed will be eligible for the 2021 tournament.)

Cameron Champ, Tyler Duncan, Dylan Frittelli, Lanto Griffin, Tyrrell Hatton (18,19), Max Homa, Im Sung-jae (17,18,19), Kang Sung-hoon, Andrew Landry, Nate Lashley, Marc Leishman (17,18,19), Sebastián Muñoz, Kevin Na (18,19), Pan Cheng-tsung, J. T. Poston, Cameron Smith (19), Nick Taylor, Brendon Todd, Matthew Wolff

- Joaquín Niemann did not play after testing positive for COVID-19.

17. All players qualifying for the 2019 edition of The Tour Championship

Abraham Ancer (18,19), Paul Casey (18,19), Corey Conners, Bryson DeChambeau (18,19), Lucas Glover, Charles Howell III, Kevin Kisner (18,19), Jason Kokrak, Hideki Matsuyama (18,19), Louis Oosthuizen (18,19), Brandt Snedeker (18,19)

18. Top 50 on the final 2019 Official World Golf Ranking list

An Byeong-hun (19), Rafa Cabrera-Bello (19), Matt Fitzpatrick (19), Adam Hadwin, Billy Horschel (19), Shugo Imahira (19), Jazz Janewattananond (19), Victor Perez (19), Andrew Putnam, Erik van Rooyen (19), Bernd Wiesberger (19)

19. Top 50 on the Official World Golf Ranking list on March 15, 2020

Christiaan Bezuidenhout, Graeme McDowell, Collin Morikawa, Scottie Scheffler

20. International invitees

== Round summaries ==
=== First round ===
Thursday, November 12, 2020
Friday, November 13, 2020

Paul Casey had the lead at −7 after the first day, with a round featuring five birdies and an eagle. Defending champion Tiger Woods was three shots back after shooting a 68 and pre-tournament favorite Bryson DeChambeau was a further two shots back after a 70. Play was suspended for three hours due to an electrical storm. 44 of the 92 players did not complete their first rounds on Thursday due to the lack of daylight. On Friday morning, Casey was joined in the lead by Dylan Frittelli and Dustin Johnson, who matched his 65.

Place	Player	Score	To par
T1	(England) Paul Casey	65	−7
T1	(South Africa) Dylan Frittelli	65	−7
T1	(United States) Dustin Johnson	65	−7
T4	(South Korea) Im Sung-jae	66	−6
T4	(United States) Justin Thomas	66	−6
T6	(England) Justin Rose	67	−5
T6	(United States) Xander Schauffele	67	−5
T6	(United States) Webb Simpson	67	−5
T6	(Australia) Cameron Smith	67	−5
T10	(Mexico) Abraham Ancer	68	−4
T10	(United States) Cameron Champ	68	−4
T10	(Germany) Bernhard Langer	68	−4
T10	(Japan) Hideki Matsuyama	68	−4
T10	(South Africa) Louis Oosthuizen	68	−4
T10	(United States) Patrick Reed	68	−4
T10	(England) Lee Westwood	68	−4
T10	(United States) Tiger Woods	68	−4

=== Second round ===
Friday, November 13, 2020
Saturday, November 14, 2020

Dustin Johnson, Jon Rahm, and Justin Thomas were among five players sharing the 36-hole lead, making it the first time the top three players in the world rankings have shared the 36-hole lead in a major championship. Johnson, a co-leader after the first round, got to 10-under-par with birdies on three of his first four holes before consecutive bogeys on holes 14 and 15 (his fifth and sixth, respectively, of the round). He then made 11 consecutive pars before closing with a birdie on the ninth to finish at 9-under-par.

Thomas made four straight birdies on holes 15 to 18 (his sixth to ninth) and overcame a double-bogey at the first, completing his round with birdies at the last two holes for a three-under-par round of 69. Rahm, who finished his round on Saturday morning, had a bogey-free 66 (−6). They were joined at the top of the leaderboard by Abraham Ancer, making his Masters debut, and Cameron Smith, who eagled the 15th before finishing with three straight birdies.

Two-time champion Bernhard Langer made the cut at three-under, becoming, at age 63, the oldest player in Masters history to make the cut. Two amateurs made the cut, John Augenstein on 3-under-par and Andy Ogletree at one-under.

With the first round still to be completed on Friday morning, the second round started at 9:30 am instead of the planned 7:00 am. 48 players did not finish their second round as play was suspended. The second round continued at 7:30 am on Saturday. After the completion of the round, 60 players made the cut, the leading 50 and ties, with the third round beginning at 10:20 am.

Place	Player	Score	To par
T1	(Mexico) Abraham Ancer	68-67=135	−9
T1	(United States) Dustin Johnson	65-70=135	−9
T1	(Spain) Jon Rahm	69-66=135	−9
T1	(Australia) Cameron Smith	67-68=135	−9
T1	(United States) Justin Thomas	66-69=135	−9
T6	(United States) Patrick Cantlay	70-66=136	−8
T6	(South Korea) Im Sung-jae	66-70=136	−8
T6	(Japan) Hideki Matsuyama	68-68=136	−8
T6	(Taiwan) Pan Cheng-tsung	70-66=136	−8
T6	(United States) Patrick Reed	68-68=136	−8

Amateurs: Augenstein (−5), Ogletree (−1), Sugrue (+4), Michel (+6), Lin (+8), Gallegos (+16)

=== Third round ===
Saturday, November 14, 2020

World No. 1 Dustin Johnson had a bogey-free round of 65 (−7) to take a four-shot lead into the final round. Johnson, part of a five-way tie for the lead going into the round, jumped to the top of the leaderboard with an eagle on the par-five second hole after hitting his approach shot to three feet. He also birdied the third hole before making a 38-foot birdie putt on the fourth. On the back nine, Johnson two-putted for birdie on both par-fives, the 13th and 15th, and saved par from left of the 18th green to finish his round. His 16-under-par score of 200 after 54 holes tied the Masters tournament record, set by Jordan Spieth in 2015. He also became the first player in Masters history with two rounds of 65 or better in the same tournament.

South Korea's Im Sung-jae, making his Masters debut, birdied the 18th after getting a fortunate bounce off the mound to the left of the green to 14 feet. He joined Abraham Ancer, another Masters rookie, and Cameron Smith in a tie for second place at 12-under-par.

Jon Rahm, tied for the lead at the start of the round, fell four shots back of Johnson playing the eighth hole before making double-bogey on the par-five, his third shot ricocheting off a tree trunk and into bushes from where he had to take a penalty drop. He had an even par round to finish seven strokes off the lead and tied for seventh place. Justin Thomas was still within two shots of Johnson but made four bogeys on the back nine to drop six back.

Place	Player	Score	To par
1	(United States) Dustin Johnson	65-70-65=200	−16
T2	(Mexico) Abraham Ancer	68-67-69=204	−12
T2	(South Korea) Im Sung-jae	66-70-68=204	−12
T2	(Australia) Cameron Smith	67-68-69=204	−12
5	(South Africa) Dylan Frittelli	65-73-67=205	−11
6	(United States) Justin Thomas	66-69-71=206	−10
T7	(Colombia) Sebastián Muñoz	70-68-69=207	−9
T7	(Spain) Jon Rahm	69-66-72=207	−9
T7	(United States) Patrick Reed	68-68-71=207	−9
T10	(England) Tommy Fleetwood	71-66-71=208	−8
T10	(United States) Brooks Koepka	70-69-69=208	−8
T10	(Japan) Hideki Matsuyama	68-68-72=208	−8
T10	(Northern Ireland) Rory McIlroy	75-66-67=208	−8

=== Final round ===
Sunday, November 15, 2020

==== Summary ====
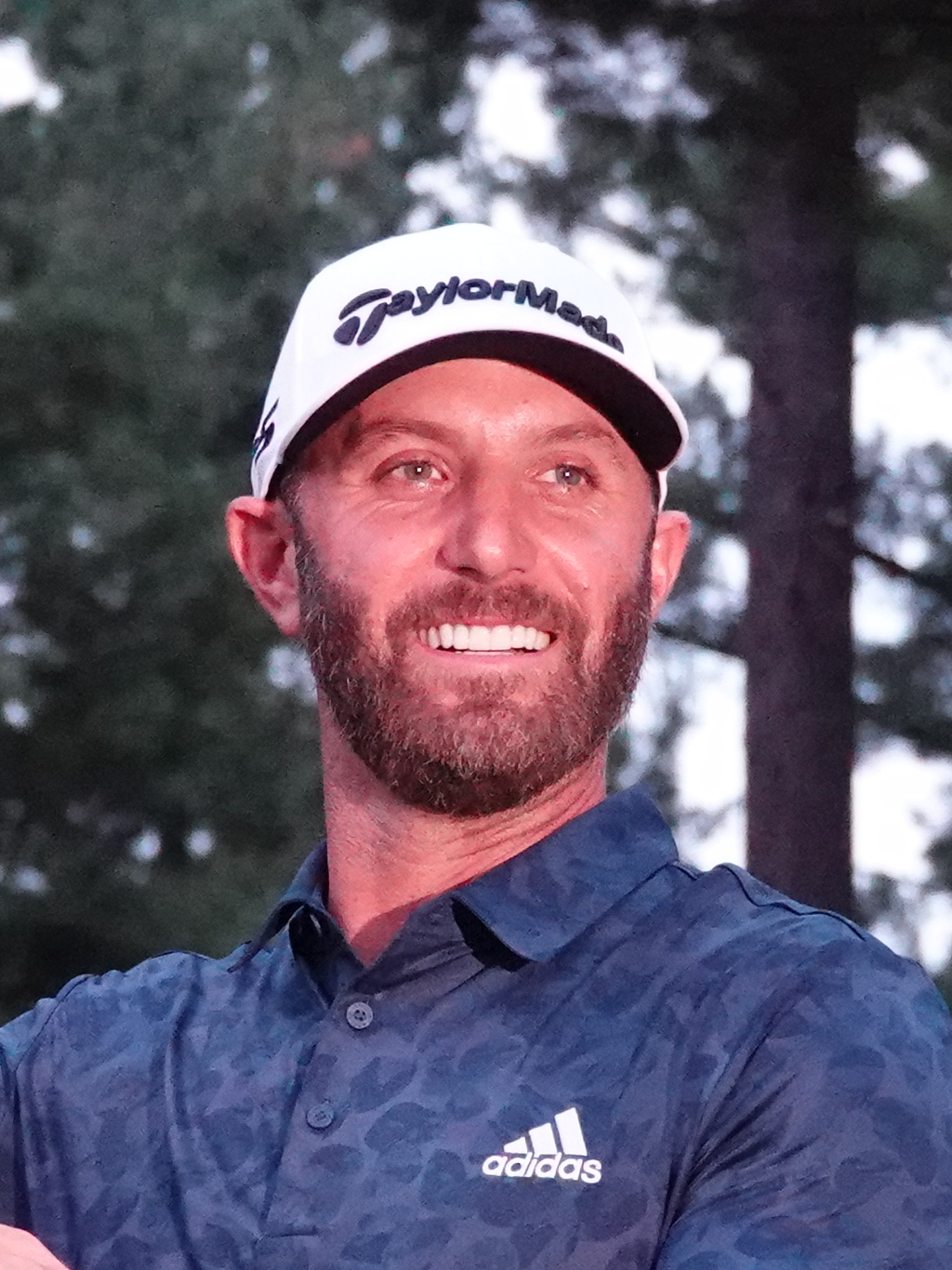
Dustin Johnson won his first Masters title

External videos
- Full final round coverage on CBS on YouTube

Dustin Johnson began the round with a four-shot lead before making consecutive bogeys at the fourth and fifth holes. Cameron Smith reduced the lead to one after making birdie at the ninth, hitting his approach shot from the pine straw to four feet.

Johnson, meanwhile, came back to birdie the sixth and two-putt for birdie on the par-five eighth after reaching the green in two, taking a two-shot lead into the back nine. He laid up on the par-five 13th but managed to get up-and-down for birdie, then made a six-foot birdie putt on the 14th. After again laying up on the 15th, Johnson chipped to seven feet for his third shot and made the birdie putt to become the first player in Masters history to reach 20-under. He made par on the final three holes to set a new Masters scoring record, breaking the old mark of 18-under set by Tiger Woods in 1997 and Jordan Spieth in 2015.

Smith bogeyed the 11th after missing the green to the right and finished at 15-under, five behind Johnson and tied for second place. Im Sung-jae, making his Masters debut at the age of 22, birdied both par-fives on the back nine to join Smith at 15-under. Smith shot a three-under 69, becoming the first player in Masters history with four rounds in the 60s. Johnson's five-shot margin of victory was the largest at the Masters since Woods won by 12 in 1997. He made only four bogeys in the tournament, the fewest ever by a Masters champion.

Woods, the defending champion, made a 10 on the par-three 12th after hitting three balls into the water, the highest score on a hole in his career. But he came back to birdie five of his last six holes, including the last four in a row for the first time at the Masters, and finished in a tie for 38th place.

Of the two amateurs who made the cut, Andy Ogletree finished at 2-under-par while John Augenstein finished at 3-over-par.

For the second year in a row, a two-tee start was used, with players teeing off between 8:00 am and 9:39 am, using the 1st and 10th tees.

==== Final leaderboard ====
Champion
Silver Cup winner (leading amateur)
(a) = amateur
(c) = past champion

Top 10
Place	Player	Score	To par	Money (US$)
1	(United States) Dustin Johnson	65-70-65-68=268	−20	2,070,000
T2	(South Korea) Im Sung-jae	66-70-68-69=273	−15	1,012,000
T2	(Australia) Cameron Smith	67-68-69-69=273	−15	1,012,000
4	(United States) Justin Thomas	66-69-71-70=276	−12	552,000
T5	(South Africa) Dylan Frittelli	65-73-67-72=277	−11	437,000
T5	(Northern Ireland) Rory McIlroy	75-66-67-69=277	−11	437,000
T7	(United States) Brooks Koepka	70-69-69-70=278	−10	358,417
T7	(Taiwan) Pan Cheng-tsung	70-66-74-68=278	−10	358,417
T7	(Spain) Jon Rahm	69-66-72-71=278	−10	358,417
T10	(Canada) Corey Conners	74-65-71-69=279	−9	287,500
T10	(United States) Patrick Reed (c)	68-68-71-72=279	−9	287,500
T10	(United States) Webb Simpson	67-73-71-68=279	−9	287,500

Leaderboard below the top 10
Place	Player	Score	To par	Money ($)
T13	(Mexico) Abraham Ancer	68-67-69-76=280	−8	215,625
T13	(Australia) Marc Leishman	70-72-70-68=280	−8	215,625
T13	(Japan) Hideki Matsuyama	68-68-72-72=280	−8	215,625
T13	(United States) Kevin Na	73-68-69-70=280	−8	215,625
T17	(United States) Patrick Cantlay	70-66-73-72=281	−7	178,250
T17	(United States) Xander Schauffele	67-73-71-70=281	−7	178,250
T19	(United States) Cameron Champ	68-74-68-72=282	−6	144,325
T19	(England) Tommy Fleetwood	71-66-71-74=282	−6	144,325
T19	(Colombia) Sebastián Muñoz	70-68-69-75=282	−6	144,325
T19	(United States) Scottie Scheffler	71-68-72-71=282	−6	144,325
T23	(South Africa) Louis Oosthuizen	68-70-75-70=283	−5	115,000
T23	(England) Justin Rose	67-70-76-70=283	−5	115,000
T25	(Republic of Ireland) Shane Lowry	74-69-68-73=284	−4	91,713
T25	(England) Ian Poulter	72-71-71-70=284	−4	91,713
T25	(South Africa) Charl Schwartzel (c)	73-71-69-71=284	−4	91,713
T25	(England) Danny Willett (c)	71-66-74-73=284	−4	91,713
T29	(United States) Rickie Fowler	70-70-75-70=285	−3	74,750
T29	(South Korea) Kang Sung-hoon	75-69-71-70=285	−3	74,750
T29	(Germany) Bernhard Langer (c)	68-73-73-71=285	−3	74,750
T29	(United States) Chez Reavie	71-72-72-70=285	−3	74,750
T29	(Canada) Nick Taylor	72-72-69-72=285	−3	74,750
T34	(United States) Bryson DeChambeau	70-74-69-73=286	−2	62,100
T34	(South Korea) Kim Si-woo	70-71-73-72=286	−2	62,100
T34	(United States) Andy Ogletree (a)	73-70-71-72=286	−2	0
T34	(Australia) Adam Scott (c)	70-72-71-73=286	−2	62,100
T38	(South Africa) Christiaan Bezuidenhout	69-73-74-71=287	−1	50,600
T38	(England) Paul Casey	65-74-71-77=287	−1	50,600
T38	(United States) Tony Finau	69-75-71-72=287	−1	50,600
T38	(United States) Billy Horschel	70-70-72-75=287	−1	50,600
T38	(England) Lee Westwood	68-74-71-74=287	−1	50,600
T38	(United States) Tiger Woods (c)	68-71-72-76=287	−1	50,600
T44	(Japan) Shugo Imahira	72-70-72-74=288	E	41,400
T44	(United States) Collin Morikawa	70-74-70-74=288	E	41,400
T46	(England) Matt Fitzpatrick	74-70-73-72=289	+1	33,672
T46	(United States) Charles Howell III	71-70-74-74=289	+1	33,672
T46	(France) Victor Perez	70-71-76-72=289	+1	33,672
T46	(United States) Jordan Spieth (c)	74-70-73-72=289	+1	33,672
T46	(England) Matt Wallace	69-73-70-77=289	+1	33,672
T51	(Spain) Rafa Cabrera-Bello	73-71-74-72=290	+2	28,003
T51	(Thailand) Jazz Janewattananond	69-71-75-75=290	+2	28,003
T51	(United States) Zach Johnson (c)	73-71-73-73=290	+2	28,003
T51	(Canada) Mike Weir (c)	71-72-71-76=290	+2	28,003
T55	(United States) John Augenstein (a)	69-72-75-75=291	+3	0
T55	(United States) Phil Mickelson (c)	69-70-79-73=291	+3	26,680
57	(United States) Bubba Watson (c)	74-69-71-78=292	+4	26,450
58	(Austria) Bernd Wiesberger	71-72-78-73=294	+6	26,220
59	(United States) Brandt Snedeker	71-71-79-74=295	+7	25,990
60	(United States) Jimmy Walker	71-73-76-76=296	+8	25,760
CUT	(South Korea) An Byeong-hun	72-73=145	+1	
CUT	(Canada) Adam Hadwin	74-71=145	+1	
CUT	(United States) Max Homa	70-75=145	+1	
CUT	(United States) Matt Kuchar	70-75=145	+1	
CUT	(Northern Ireland) Graeme McDowell	72-73=145	+1	
CUT	(United States) Andrew Putnam	73-72=145	+1	
CUT	(Sweden) Henrik Stenson	71-74=145	+1	
CUT	(United States) Gary Woodland	72-73=145	+1	
CUT	(South Africa) Justin Harding	75-71=146	+2	
CUT	(United States) Brendon Todd	73-73=146	+2	
CUT	(United States) Lanto Griffin	74-73=147	+3	
CUT	(England) Tyrrell Hatton	73-74=147	+3	
CUT	(United States) Kevin Kisner	71-76=147	+3	
CUT	(United States) Larry Mize (c)	70-77=147	+3	
CUT	(United States) Matthew Wolff	70-77=147	+3	
CUT	(Australia) Jason Day	70-78=148	+4	
CUT	(United States) Tyler Duncan	77-71=148	+4	
CUT	(United States) Jason Kokrak	71-77=148	+4	
CUT	(United States) J. T. Poston	73-75=148	+4	
CUT	(Republic of Ireland) James Sugrue (a)	77-71=148	+4	
CUT	(United States) Fred Couples (c)	77-73=150	+6	
CUT	(Australia) Lukas Michel (a)	76-74=150	+6	
CUT	(Italy) Francesco Molinari	72-78=150	+6	
CUT	(United States) Lucas Glover	77-74=151	+7	
CUT	(United States) Nate Lashley	75-76=151	+7	
CUT	(Scotland) Sandy Lyle (c)	78-73=151	+7	
CUT	(China) Lin Yuxin (a)	79-73=152	+8	
CUT	(Spain) José María Olazábal (c)	78-80=158	+14	
CUT	(Argentina) Abel Gallegos (a)	79-81=160	+16	
CUT	(United States) Andrew Landry	78-82=160	+16	
WD	(Fiji) Vijay Singh (c)	75	+3	
WD	(South Africa) Erik van Rooyen	76	+4	

==== Scorecard ====
Hole	1	2	3	4	5	6	7	8	9	10	11	12	13	14	15	16	17	18
Par	4	5	4	3	4	3	4	5	4	4	4	3	5	4	5	3	4	4
(United States) Johnson	−16	−16	−17	−16	−15	−16	−16	−17	−17	−17	−17	−17	−18	−19	−20	−20	−20	−20
(South Korea) Im	−12	−13	−14	−14	−14	−13	−12	−13	−13	−13	−13	−13	−14	−14	−15	−15	−15	−15
(Australia) Smith	−12	−13	−14	−14	−13	−13	−14	−14	−15	−15	−14	−14	−14	−14	−15	−15	−15	−15
(United States) Thomas	−10	−9	−9	−9	−9	−9	−9	−10	−10	−10	−10	−11	−11	−11	−13	−13	−12	−12
(South Africa) Frittelli	−11	−11	−11	−11	−10	−10	−11	−10	−11	−11	−11	−11	−11	−12	−12	−11	−11	−11
(Northern Ireland) McIlroy	−8	−8	−9	−9	−9	−10	−10	−11	−11	−10	−10	−10	−11	−11	−11	−11	−11	−11
(United States) Koepka	−8	−8	−8	−8	−8	−8	−9	−9	−9	−9	−8	−8	−9	−9	−10	−10	−10	−10
(Taiwan) Pan	−6	−7	−7	−7	−7	−7	−6	−7	−7	−7	−7	−6	−7	−7	−8	−9	−10	−10
(Spain) Rahm	−8	−9	−9	−9	−9	−9	−9	−9	−9	−8	−8	−6	−7	−7	−9	−10	−9	−10
(Mexico) Ancer	−12	−12	−11	−10	−10	−9	−8	−9	−9	−8	−7	−7	−7	−7	−8	−8	−8	−8

Cumulative tournament scores, relative to par

Eagle	Birdie	Bogey	Double bogey

== Media ==
This was the 65th consecutive Masters to air on CBS Sports, which began coverage in 1956. Cable coverage aired on ESPN. To ensure that play would conclude before the earlier sunset, and to accommodate CBS's coverage of the NFL, the final round was scheduled so that coverage would begin at 10:00 a.m. ET (similarly to the previous year's final round, which was moved up due to the threat of storms) and conclude around 2:30 p.m. ET. To accommodate the tournament, CBS was only assigned late-afternoon NFL games (4:05 p.m. ET kickoff) for that week's games. Furthermore, CBS's SEC football game on Saturday, normally a 3:30 p.m. ET game, was scheduled for a 6:00 p.m. ET kickoff so that it could air as a lead-out for third round coverage. It was reported that in the event that the final round did overrun past 4:00 p.m. ET, coverage could be shifted to ESPN's sister broadcast network ABC and simulcast on CBS Sports Network, but that this was highly unlikely.

The SEC game was postponed due to COVID-19 cases in one of the participating teams, leading to CBS scheduling only its pre-game show College Football Today (largely to recap the day's games) after the conclusion of coverage, and giving the rest of the game's broadcast window back to affiliates and its regular Saturday-night network programming.

To cross-promote the tournament, ESPN broadcast College GameDay on-location from Augusta National's par 3 course on November 14.

For the first time since 1963, there was no live coverage of the Masters on free to air television in the UK, with pay television broadcaster Sky Sports securing exclusive rights. Extended highlights were however shown free to air by BBC Sport with what turned out to be the last major tournament covered by veteran commentator Peter Alliss who died less than a month later in December 2020.

=== Viewership ===
Facing competition from early-afternoon NFL games on Fox, the final round was seen by 5.59 million viewers in the United States according to the Nielsen ratings — making it the least watched final round at the Masters since 1957.
