= Zimmer Biomet Championship =

Golf tournament in Alabama

Tournament information
- Location: Opelika, Alabama
- Established: 2019
- Course(s): Grand National
- Par: 72
- Tour(s): Symetra Tour
- Format: 72-hole Stroke play
- Prize fund: $300,000
- Month played: May
- Final year: 2020

Final champion
- (Spain) Nuria Iturrios

The Zimmer Biomet Championship hosted by Nancy Lopez was a tournament on the Symetra Tour, the LPGA's developmental tour. It was a part of the Symetra Tour's schedule between 2019 and 2020.

The tournament was held over 72 holes at Lake Course at Grand National on the Robert Trent Jones Golf Trail in Opelika, Alabama. It was hosted by LPGA Tour veteran Nancy Lopez and featured a total purse of $300,000, the highest in Symetra Tour history. Title sponsor was Zimmer Biomet, a publicly traded medical device company.

Nuria Iturrios from Mallorca, Spain, won the inaugural tournament by two strokes over Maddie Szeryk of Canada.

The tournament in 2020 was cancelled due to the COVID-19 pandemic.

== Winners ==
| Year | Date | Winner | Country | Score | Margin of victory | Runner-up | Purse ($) | Winner's share ($) |
|---|---|---|---|---|---|---|---|---|
| 2020 | May 20–23 | Tournament cancelled | | | | | 300,000 | 45,000 |
| 2019 | May 23–26 | Nuria Iturrios | Spain | 276 (−12) | 2 strokes | (Canada) Maddie Szeryk | 300,000 | 45,000 |
