= French Lick Charity Championship =

Golf tournament in Indiana

Tournament information
- Location: French Lick, Indiana
- Established: 2017
- Course(s): French Lick Resort
- Par: 71
- Length: 6,431 yards (5,881 m)
- Tour(s): Epson Tour
- Format: Stroke play
- Prize fund: $335,000
- Month played: August
- Final year: 2023

Final champion
- (South Korea) Jeon Ji-won

The French Lick Charity Championship was a golf tournament on the Epson Tour, the LPGA's developmental tour, from 2017 to 2023. It was held at French Lick Resort in French Lick, Indiana.

The tournament was held on the Donald Ross Course, named in honor of the Scottish-born golf course designer Donald Ross, who built the resort's second course in 1917.

The 2020 tournament was cancelled due to the COVID-19 pandemic.

With her win in 2021, Casey Danielson took the Symetra Tour money lead and wrapped up an LPGA Tour card for 2022.

Starting in 2022, the event is hosted on the resort's second course, the Pete Dye Course, and contested over 72 holes with a purse of $335,000.

== Winners ==
Year	Date	Winner	Country	Score	Margin of victory	Runner(s)-up	Purse ($)	Winner's share ($)
French Lick Charity Championship
2023	Aug 6	Jeon Ji-won	South Korea	273 (−15)	3 strokes	(United States) Kristen Gillman	335,000	50,250
2022	Aug 7	Yin Xiaowen	China	281 (−7)	1 stroke	(United States) Gabriella Then	335,000	50,250
Donald Ross Classic at French Lick Resort
2021	Jul 10	Casey Danielson	United States	203 (−10)	1 stroke	(United States) Beth Wu	250,000	37,500
2020	Jul 11	No tournament					225,000	33,750
2019	Jul 13	Patty Tavatanakit	Thailand	200 (−13)	3 strokes	(Chinese Taipei) Ssu-Chia Cheng	225,000	33,750
2018	Jul 24	Stephanie Kono	United States	202 (−11)	1 stroke	(Philippines) Dottie Ardina (United States) Karen Chung	225,000	33,750
Donald Ross Centennial Classic
2017	Jul 9	Erynne Lee	United States	201 (−12)	Playoff	(United States) August Kim	200,000	30,000
