= Austin Connelly =

Canadian-American golfer (born 1996)

Personal information
- Full name: Austin William Connelly
- Nationality: Canada; United States
- Born: September 18, 1996 (age 30) Irving, Texas
- Height: 5 ft 7 in (1.70 m)
- Weight: 150 lb (68 kg; 11 st)

Career
- Sport: Golf
- Turned professional: 2015
- Former tours: European Tour; Challenge Tour; PGA Tour Canada

Best results in major championships
- Masters Tournament: DNP
- PGA Championship: DNP
- U.S. Open: DNP
- The Open Championship: T14: 2017
Medal record
Pan American Games
Bronze medal – third place	2019 Lima	Mixed team

Austin Connelly (born September 18, 1996) is a professional golfer who plays on the European Tour. He holds dual citizenship in Canada and the United States.

== Amateur career ==
Connelly was born in Irving, Texas, to an American mother and Canadian father. Connelly won the 2014 FJ Invitational by six strokes, and he won the Jones Cup Invitational the following year. He played two 2015 PGA Tour events as an amateur, the AT&T Byron Nelson Championship and RBC Canadian Open, and made the cut in both. After committing to Southern Methodist University, and later the University of Arkansas, Connelly instead turned professional in August 2015.

== Professional career ==
In 2015, Connelly played three events on PGA Tour Canada, making two cuts. The next season, he had four top-10 finishes and placed seventh on the tour's Order of Merit. He earned conditional status for the 2017 European Tour season via its qualifying school and had a pair of top-10 results at the ISPS Handa World Super 6 Perth and the Nordea Masters.

Connelly qualified for the 2017 Open Championship through Final Qualifying at Royal Cinque Ports, winning a four-man playoff for the final place. Being tied for third after the third round shooting 67-72-66 (-5), he finished the tournament in a tie for 14th place. In September 2017 he had his best finish on the European Tour, finishing runner-up in the KLM Open.

At the 2019 Pan American Games, Connelly teamed with amateurs Joey Savoie, Mary Parsons, and Brigitte Thibault, to win the bronze medal in the mixed team event.

== Amateur wins ==
- 2011 Hilton Head Junior, Junior All Star at Penn State
- 2013 Under Armour/Hunter Mahan Championship
- 2014 FJ Invitational, Copa Juan Carlos Tailhade
- 2015 Jones Cup Invitational

== Results in major championships ==
Tournament	2017	2018
Masters Tournament		
U.S. Open		
The Open Championship	T14	
PGA Championship		

Tournament	2019
Masters Tournament	
PGA Championship	
U.S. Open	
The Open Championship	CUT

Did not play

CUT = missed the half-way cut
"T" indicates a tie for a place

== Team appearances ==
Amateur

- Junior Ryder Cup (representing the United States): 2014 (winners)
- Pan American Games (representing Canada): 2015, 2019

Professional

- Aruba Cup (representing PGA Tour Canada): 2016
