= Emilia Migliaccio =

American amateur golfer (born 1999)

Emilia Doran
Personal information
- Nationality: United States
- Born: April 25, 1999 (age 27)
- Height: 5 ft 9 in (175 cm)

Career
- Sport: Golf
- College: Wake Forest University
- Status: Amateur

Best results in LPGA major championships
- Chevron Championship: 72nd: 2020
- Women's PGA C'ship: DNP
- U.S. Women's Open: CUT: 2018, 2020, 2023
- Women's British Open: DNP
- Evian Championship: DNP
Medal record
Pan American Games
Gold medal – first place	2019 Lima	Individual
Gold medal – first place	2019 Lima	Mixed team

Emilia Doran (née Migliaccio, born April 25, 1999) is an American amateur golfer. In 2019, she won the gold medal in the women's individual event at the Pan American Games held in Lima, Peru. Migliaccio, Brandon Wu, Stewart Hagestad and Rose Zhang also won the gold medal in the mixed team event.

Doran chose not to turn professional following her collegiate career.

== Amateur wins ==
- 2014 IJGA Junior Open, Greg Norman Champions Golf Academy Junior Championship, PKBGT Invitational
- 2015 Scott Robertson Memorial, Western National Junior Championship, Davis Love III Junior Open, IZOD AJGA Championship
- 2016 Scott Robertson Memorial
- 2017 Scott Robertson Memorial, Mercedes-Benz Intercollegiate
- 2018 The Sally, Ruth's Chris Tar Heel Invite
- 2019 Harder Hall Women's Invitational, Bryan National Collegiate, ACC Championship, Pan American Games (gold medal)
- 2020 Darius Rucker Intercollegiate
- 2022 North and South Women's Amateur
- 2025 Donna Andrews Invitational

== U.S. national team appearances ==
- Junior Ryder Cup: 2016 (winners)
- Junior Solheim Cup: 2017 (winners)
- Arnold Palmer Cup: 2018 (winners), 2019, 2020, 2021 (winners), 2023
- The Spirit International Amateur Golf Championship: 2019
- Curtis Cup: 2021 (winners), 2022 (winners)
