= Golf at the 2019 Pan American Games – Women's individual =

Golf – Women's individual at the 2019 Pan American Games
- Venue: Country Club Villa
- Start date: August 8, 2019
- End date: August 11, 2019
- Competitors: 32 from 18 nations
- Winning score: 276 (−8)

Medalists
Gold medal	Emilia Migliaccio	United States
Silver medal	Julieta Granada	Paraguay
Bronze medal	Paula Hurtado	Colombia

The women's individual competition of the Golf events at the 2019 Pan American Games was held between August 8 and 11 at the Country Club Villa in Lima, Peru.

Amateur Emilia Migliaccio won the gold medal for the United States.

== Schedule ==
All times are PET (UTC−5).

Date	Time	Round
August 8, 2019	8:00	Round 1
August 9, 2019	8:00	Round 2
August 10, 2019	8:00	Round 3
August 11, 2019	8:00	Round 4

== Results ==
The final results were:

Rank	Name	Nation	Round 1	Round 2	Round 3	Round 4	Total
1st place, gold medalist(s)	Emilia Migliaccio (a)	United States	70	68	68	70	276 (−8)
2nd place, silver medalist(s)	Julieta Granada	Paraguay	70	71	71	68	280 (−4)
3rd place, bronze medalist(s)	Paula Hurtado-Restrepo	Colombia	71	72	70	68	281 (−3)
4	Alejandra Llaneza	Mexico	71	70	73	70	284 (E)
5	Mary Parsons (a)	Canada	68	73	75	70	286 (+2)
6	Valentina Gilly (a)	Venezuela	71	72	72	72	287 (+3)
7	Sofia García (a)	Paraguay	74	71	71	72	288 (+4)
8	Rose Zhang (a)	United States	72	76	72	69	289 (+5)
T9	Brigitte Thibault (a)	Canada	74	73	68	75	290 (+6)
T9	Paola Moreno	Colombia	71	73	74	72	290 (+6)
T9	Ana Isabel González Cantú (a)	Mexico	72	73	74	71	290 (+6)
12	Sofia Garcia Austt (a)	Uruguay	73	72	71	75	291 (+7)
13	Pilar Echeverria (a)	Guatemala	71	78	70	73	292 (+8)
14	Rachel Kuehn (a)	Dominican Republic	73	71	75	74	293 (+9)
15	Ela Belen Anacona (a)	Argentina	76	74	69	75	294 (+10)
16	Valeria Mendizabal (a)	Guatemala	75	78	71	71	295 (+11)
T17	Nina Rissi Miozzo (a)	Brazil	72	72	77	75	296 (+12)
T17	Micaela D. Faraha (a)	Peru	73	73	76	74	296 (+12)
19	Vanessa Gilly (a)	Venezuela	69	76	75	77	297 (+13)
20	Jimena Marques Vazquez (a)	Uruguay	73	73	78	74	298 (+14)
T21	Antonia Matte I (a)	Chile	79	71	76	74	300 (+16)
T21	Laura Restrepo	Panama	78	72	76	74	300 (+16)
23	Luiza Altmann	Brazil	76	79	74	73	302 (+18)
24	Manuela Carbajo Re	Argentina	70	79	73	81	303 (+19)
25	Mercedes Solange Gómez (a)	Ecuador	78	75	75	76	304 (+20)
T26	Emily Odwin (a)	Barbados	80	73	78	74	305 (+21)
T26	Natalia Villavicencio (a)	Chile	71	80	78	76	305 (+21)
28	María Palacios Siegenthaler	Peru	75	77	78	77	307 (+23)
29	Izzy Lawrence (a)	Trinidad and Tobago	80	80	79	69	308 (+24)
30	Luciana Calbimonte Osorio	Bolivia	77	87	80	77	321 (+37)
31	Maria Jose Savoca Cespedes	Bolivia	83	80	83	78	324 (+40)
DQ	Maria B. Arizaga (a)	Ecuador	79	DQ	–	–	DQ

(a) denotes an amateur
