= Julieta Granada =

Paraguayan professional golfer (born 1986)

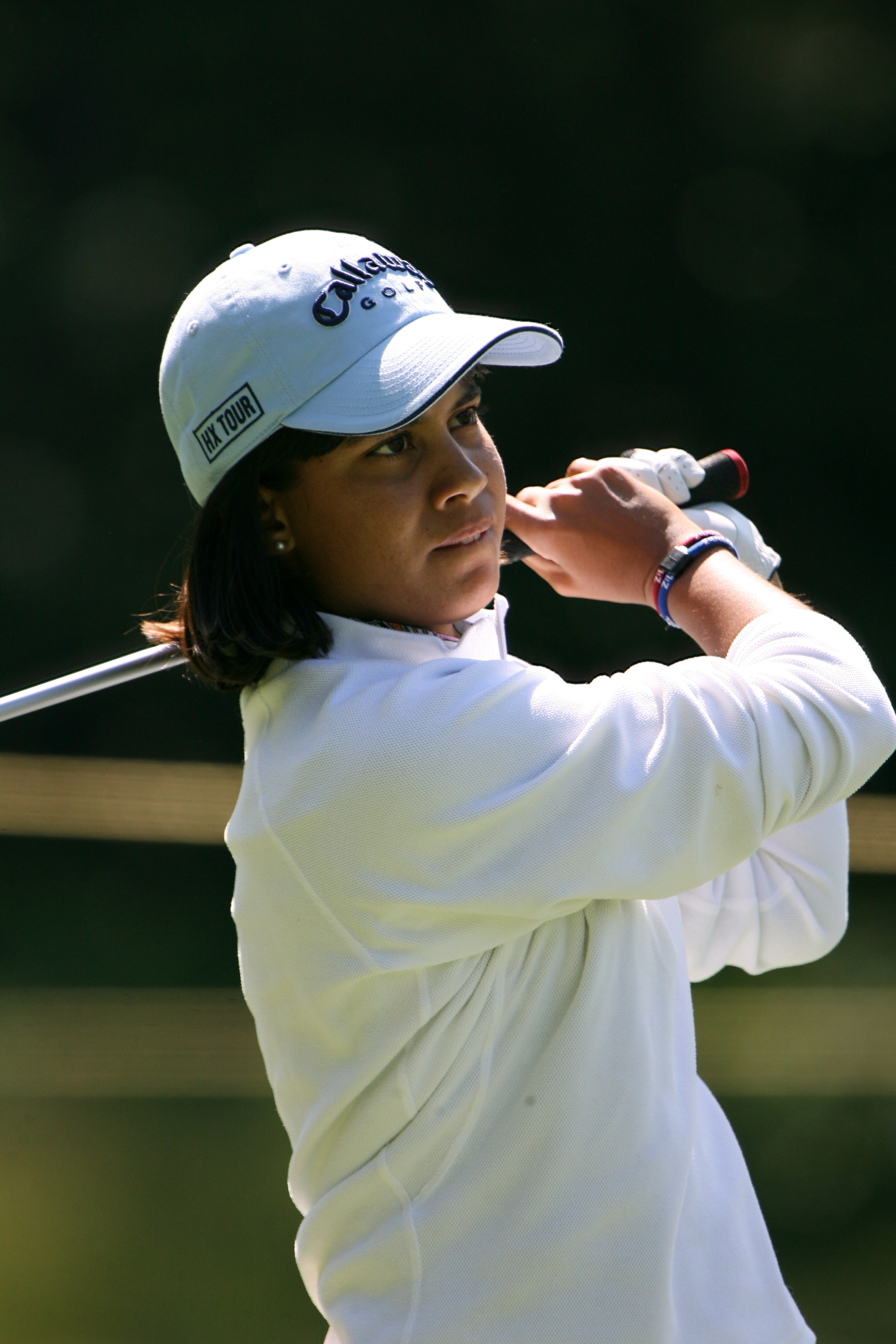
- Granada at the 2007 LPGA Championship

Personal information
- Nationality: Paraguay
- Born: 17 November 1986 (age 39) Asunción, Paraguay
- Height: 5 ft 2 in (1.57 m)

Career
- Sport: Golf
- Turned professional: 2005
- Former tours: LPGA Tour; Ladies European Tour; Symetra Tour
- Professional wins: 3

Number of wins by tour
- LPGA Tour: 1
- Epson Tour: 1
- Other: 1

Best results in LPGA major championships
- Chevron Championship: T7: 2011
- Women's PGA C'ship: T6: 2014
- U.S. Women's Open: T10: 2007
- Women's British Open: T5: 2014
- Evian Championship: T32: 2014

Achievements and awards
- AJGA Player of the Year: 2004
- Athlete of the Year in Paraguay: 2005
Medal record
Pan American Games
Silver medal – second place	2019 Lima	Individual
Silver medal – second place	2019 Lima	Mixed team
Bronze medal – third place	2015 Toronto	Individual

Julieta Granada (born 17 November 1986) is a Paraguayan professional golfer who played on the U.S.-based LPGA Tour and the Ladies European Tour.

== Amateur career ==
Born in Asunción, Paraguay, Granada moved to the United States with her mother at the age of 14 in 2001 after receiving a scholarship to attend the David Leadbetter Golf Academy in Bradenton, Florida. While a student there, she earned numerous junior amateur titles. She was named to the American Junior Golf Association All-America Team from 2001 to 2004 and was the AJGA player of the year in 2004 when she won the U.S. Girls' Junior Championship. Granada graduated in 2005 from the Pendleton School, a private school established solely for students attending the Leadbetter Academy and other affiliated IMG sports academies.

== Professional career ==
Granada turned professional in June 2005 at age 18 and competed on the Futures Tour that summer, joining in mid-season. She placed second in her first and sixth events and won her first professional title at the season-ending YWCA Futures Classic in late August in York, Pennsylvania. Granada won $29,153 in nine Futures Tour events to finish seventh on the 2005 money list, which advanced her to the final stage of the LPGA qualifying tournament in December. She finished tied for sixth in the five-round event to earn her LPGA card for 2006.

In her rookie season on the LPGA Tour, Granada was 19th on the 2006 money list going into the season-ending LPGA playoffs at the ADT in November. She won the final round of the elimination-format event in Florida to claim the first $1 million prize in women's golf and vaulted up to fourth on the money list. At the end of 2008, Granada attended qualifying school for the Ladies European Tour (LET) and has played on the LPGA and LET tours since.

Granada won the gold medal at the 2014 South American Games and the bronze medal at the 2015 Pan American Games. She was the flagbearer for Paraguay at the 2016 Summer Olympics, where she finished 44th. At the 2019 Pan American Games, she won the silver medals in the women's individual competition and the mixed team competition.

== Amateur victories and honors ==
- 2001-2004: Member of American Junior Golf Association (AJGA) All-America Team.
- 2002: Member of Canon Cup Team
- 2003: Member of Canon Cup Team
- 2004: Winner of AJGA Rolex Girls Junior Championship. AJGA Player of the Year. Quarterfinalist in USGA Amateur Public Links Championship. Athlete of the Year in Paraguay. Winner of South American Championship individual and team titles. Six overall wins in 2004.
- 2005: Winner of South Atlantic Ladies Amateur Championship

== Professional wins (3) ==
=== Futures Tour (1) ===
No.	Date	Tournament	Winning score	To par	Margin of victory	Runner-up	Purse ($)	Winner's share ($)
1	Aug 28, 2005	YWCA Futures Classic	68-70-68=206	– 10	1 stroke	(United States) Jessica Lewis	75,000	10,500

=== LPGA Tour (1) ===
No.	Date	Tournament	Winning score	To par	Margin of victory	Runner-up	Purse ($)	Winner's share ($)
1	Nov 19, 2006	LPGA Playoffs at The ADT	70-69-69-**68**	– 4	2 strokes	(Mexico) Lorena Ochoa	1,550,000	1,000,000

The total score is not shown because it did not determine the winner. Championship (fourth round) score is shown in bold.

LPGA Tour playoff record (0–2)

No.	Year	Tournament	Opponents	Result
1	2012	Women's Australian Open	(United States) Jessica Korda (United States) Stacy Lewis (United States) Brittany Lincicome (South Korea) So Yeon Ryu (South Korea) Hee Kyung Seo	Korda won with birdie on second extra hole
2	2014	CME Group Tour Championship	(Spain) Carlota Ciganda (New Zealand) Lydia Ko	Ko won with par on fourth extra hole Granada eliminated by par on second hole

=== Other (1) ===
- 2007 (1) Women's World Cup of Golf (with (Paraguay) Celeste Troche)

LET playoff record (0–1)

No.	Year	Tournament	Opponents	Result
1	2010	Suzhou Taihu Ladies Open	(South Africa) Lee-Anne Pace (Netherlands) Christel Boeljon (United States) Hannah Jun	Pace won with birdie on second extra hole Granada eliminated by par on first hole

== Results in LPGA majors ==
Results not in chronological order before 2018.

Tournament	2005	2006	2007	2008	2009	2010	2011	2012
ANA Inspiration	T30		T27	T63	CUT	T75	T7	T35
U.S. Women's Open		T46	T10	CUT		CUT	CUT	CUT
Women's PGA Championship		T44	CUT	T65	75	CUT	T50	CUT
Women's British Open		8	CUT			CUT	T59	7

Tournament	2013	2014	2015	2016	2017	2018	2019	2020
ANA Inspiration	T41	CUT	CUT	70				
U.S. Women's Open	T25	T22	CUT	CUT		CUT		
Women's PGA Championship	CUT	T6	T22	CUT		CUT		
The Evian Championship ^	T57	T32	T64					NT
Women's British Open	CUT	T5	T44					T56

^ The Evian Championship was added as a major in 2013

Top 10
Did not play

CUT = missed the half-way cut
NT = no tournament
"T" = tied

=== Summary ===
Tournament	Wins	2nd	3rd	Top-5	Top-10	Top-25	Events	Cuts made
ANA Inspiration	0	0	0	0	1	1	11	8
U.S. Women's Open	0	0	0	0	1	3	11	4
Women's PGA Championship	0	0	0	0	1	2	12	6
The Evian Championship	0	0	0	0	0	0	3	3
Women's British Open	0	0	0	1	3	3	9	6
Totals	0	0	0	1	6	9	46	27

- Most consecutive cuts made – 5 (2005 Kraft Nabisco – 2007 Kraft Nabisco)
- Longest streak of top-10s – 2 (2014 British – 2014 LPGA)

== LPGA Tour career summary ==
Year	Tournaments played	Cuts made	Wins	2nd	3rd	Top 10s	Best finish	Earnings ($)	Money list rank	Scoring average	Scoring rank
2005	3	2	0	0	0	0	T27	n/a		73.33	
2006	30	26	1	2	0	7	1	1,633,586	4	71.33	15
2007	28	18	0	2	0	3	2	412,440	33	72.92	53
2008	25	12	0	0	0	0	12	101,140	100	73.31	105
2009	18	8	0	0	0	0	T20	65,229	106	73.94	126
2010	16	6	0	0	0	0	22	52,309	94	74.49	127
2011	18	9	0	0	0	2	T7	137,221	61	73.16	70
2012	26	20	0	1	0	4	T2	445,685	31	71.97	34
2013	26	19	0	0	0	2	T9	224,662	55	72.36	60
2014	28	27	0	1	0	8	T2	762,803	18	70.94	15
2015	28	25	0	0	0	2	T7	348,645	51	71.76	49
2016	22	8	0	0	0	0	T38	35,674	130	74.12	153
2017	8	0	0	0	0	0	Cut	0	n/a	74.25	n/a
2018	15	6	0	0	0	0	T39	39,164	137	71.85	69
2019	3	2	0	0	0	0	T58	9,204	167	71.67	n/a
2020	12	3	0	0	0	0	T56	16,246	136	74.13	131
2021	2	0	0	0	0	0	Cut	0	n/a	77.25	n/a
2022	Did not play										
2023	7	1	0	0	0	0	T31	6,671	187	74.60	n/a

- official through 2023 season

== LET career summary ==
Year	Tournaments played	Cuts made	Wins	2nd	3rd	Top 10s	Best finish	Earnings (€)	Order of Merit	Scoring average	Scoring rank
2009	6	6	0	0	0	1	T9	21,335	63		
2010	6	4	0	1	0	4	T2	37,886	56		
2011	6	5	0	0	0	2	T6	38,944	62	71.33	

== Symetra Tour summary ==
Year	Tournaments played	Cuts made	Wins	2nd	3rd	Top 10s	Best finish	Earnings ($)	Money list rank	Scoring average	Scoring rank
2005	9	9	1	2	0	4	1	29,153	7	70.88	n/a (4)
2017	4	1	0	0	0	0	T54	833	n/a	73.60	n/a
2018	2	1	0	0	0	0	T14	2,353	7	70.40	n/a
2019	19	18	0	3	1	8	2	94,343	6	70.16	3

== Team appearances ==
Amateur

- Espirito Santo Trophy (representing Paraguay): 2000, 2004

Professional

- Lexus Cup (representing International team): 2006
- World Cup (representing Paraguay): 2007 (winners), 2008

Olympic Games
Preceded by Julia Marino	Flagbearer for Paraguay; Rio de Janeiro 2016	Succeeded by Verónica Cepede Royg & Fabrizio Zanotti
