= Robert S. Karlsson =

Swedish professional golfer (born 1988)

Personal information
- Full name: Robert Stefan Karlsson
- Nationality: Sweden
- Born: 29 July 1988 (age 38) Kalmar, Sweden
- Height: 5 ft 10 in (1.78 m)
- Weight: 165 lb (75 kg)

Career
- Sport: Golf
- College: Liberty University
- Turned professional: 2013
- Former tours: PGA Tour Canada; Nordic Golf League
- Professional wins: 2

Achievements and awards
- Big South Freshman of the Year: 2009
- Big South Men's Golfer of the Year: 2010, 2011

Robert Stefan Karlsson (born 29 July 1988) is a Swedish retired professional golfer. In 2012, he won the Palmer Cup, St Andrews Trophy and Bonallack Trophy with Europe, and rose to third in the EGA's European Amateur Ranking. In 2015, he was runner-up at The Players Cup in Canada.

== Amateur career ==
Karlsson was born in 1988 in Kalmar and competed on the Swedish Junior Tour from 2003 through 2008, and captured several titles. In 2009, he won the qualifier for the Scandinavian Masters but went on to not make the cut. Instead he made his first European Tour cut at the same tournament in 2011, where tied for 24th as the leading amateur.

Karlsson played for the national team and won bronze at the 2011 European Amateur Team Championship in Portugal, as Sweden beat Germany 4–3 in the bronze game. In 2012, he represented a triumphing European team in the St Andrews Trophy at Portmarnock Golf Club in Ireland, and at the Bonallack Trophy in Portugal alongside Jon Rahm and Thomas Detry, as Europe beat an Asia-Pacific team that included Hideki Matsuyama and Cameron Smith by 21 1/2–10 1/2.

In 2012, he ended the season third in the European Amateur Ranking behind Daan Huizing and Matthias Schwab.

== College career ==
Karlsson accepted a golf scholarship to Liberty University and played with the Liberty Flames golf team between 2008 and 2012, where he won several titles including the conference championship. He was 2009 Big South Freshman of the Year, and named Big South Men's Golfer of the Year back-to-back in 2010 and 2011.

Karlsson crowned his college career with a selection to represent Europe in the Palmer Cup as only the second in Big South Conference history, joining Coastal Carolina's Dustin Johnson who represented the United States in 2007. Karlsson halved his Friday singles game against Patrick Cantlay in 2011, and won the same game against Derek Ernst in 2012, 2 and 1, helping Europe to secure the title with a score of 13–11 at Royal County Down Golf Club in Northern Ireland.

== Professional career ==
Karlsson turned professional in 2013 and played on the PGA Tour Canada in 2014 and 2015, where he recorded a solo third at the 2014 Dakota Dunes Open and was runner-up at The Players Cup in 2015, behind C.T. Pan.

In 2018, he joined the Nordic Golf League, where he was runner-up at the 2018 Camfil Nordic Championship in Denmark and tied for third at the 2020 Lumine Hills Open in Spain, before he won a playoff for the 2021 TanumStrand Fjällbacka Open.

Karlsson announced his retirement from touring following the 2021 season. He peaked at 584th in the Official World Golf Ranking in 2021.

== Amateur wins ==
- 2007 Skandia Tour Riks #1 - Småland
- 2008 Skandia Tour Elit #1
- 2009 Cleveland Golf Palmetto Intercollegiate, First Market Bank Intercollegiate
- 2010 Big South Championship

== Professional wins (2) ==
=== Nordic Golf League wins (1) ===
No.	Date	Tournament	Winning score	Margin of victory	Runner-up
1	22 May 2021	TanumStrand Fjällbacka Open	−12 (68-66-67=201)	Playoff	(Sweden) Christopher Feldborg Nielsen

=== Other wins (1) ===
- 2016 Wiredaholm Open (SGF Golf Ranking)

== Team appearances ==
Amateur

- European Amateur Team Championship (representing Sweden): 2011
- Spirit International Amateur (representing Sweden): 2011
- Palmer Cup (representing Europe): 2011, 2012 (winners)
- Eisenhower Trophy (representing Sweden): 2012
- St Andrews Trophy (representing the Continent of Europe): 2012 (winners)
- Bonallack Trophy (representing Europe): 2012 (winners)
