= Golf at the 2019 Pan American Games =

- Golf pictogram
- Venue: Country Club Villa
- Dates: August 8–11, 2019
- No. of events: 3 (1 men, 1 women, 1 mixed)
- Competitors: 64 from 20 nations

Golf competitions at the 2019 Pan American Games in Lima, Peru were held between August 8 and 11, 2019 at the Country Club Villa.

A total of three events were contested: an individual competition for men and women plus a mixed team competition. A total of 64 golfers (32 per gender) qualified to compete at the 2020 Olympic Games.

== Competition schedule ==
The following was the competition schedule for the golf competitions:

R1	Round 1	R2	Round 2	R3	Round 3	R4	Round 4/Final

Event↓/Date →	Thu 8	Fri 9	Sat 10	Sun 11
Men's individual	R1	R2	R3	R4
Women's individual	R1	R2	R3	R4
Mixed team	R1	R2	R3	R4

== Medal table ==
Rank	Nation	Gold	Silver	Bronze	Total
1	United States	2	0	0	2
2	Paraguay	1	2	0	3
3	Guatemala	0	1	0	1
4	Canada	0	0	1	1
4	Chile	0	0	1	1
4	Colombia	0	0	1	1
Totals (6 entries)		3	3	3	9

== Medalists ==
Event	Gold	Silver	Bronze
Men's individual	Fabrizio Zanotti; Paraguay	José Toledo; Guatemala	Mito Pereira; Chile
Women's individual	Emilia Migliaccio; United States	Julieta Granada; Paraguay	Paula Hurtado-Restrepo; Colombia
Mixed team	United States; Stewart Hagestad; Emilia Migliaccio; Brandon Wu; Rose Zhang	Paraguay; Carlos Franco; Sofia García; Julieta Granada; Fabrizio Zanotti	Canada; Austin Connelly; Mary Parsons; Joey Savoie; Brigitte Thibault

== Qualification ==
A total of 64 golfers (32 per gender) qualified to compete. Each nation was able to enter a maximum of 4 athletes (two per gender). The host nation, Peru, automatically qualified the maximum number of athletes (4). The rest of the spots were awarded across the Official World Golf Ranking and Women's World Golf Rankings as of May 7, 2019. Any remaining spots were allocated using the World Amateur Golf Ranking as of May 9, 2019.

== See also ==
- Golf at the 2020 Summer Olympics
