= Julián Périco =

Peruvian professional golfer (born 1999)

Personal information
- Nationality: Peru
- Born: 16 November 1999 (age 26) Lima, Peru
- Height: 5 ft 11 in (1.80 m)

Career
- Sport: Golf
- College: University of Arkansas
- Turned professional: 2023
- Current tour: Challenge Tour
- Professional wins: 2

Achievements and awards
- Bishops Gate Golf Academy Player of the Year: 2018

Julián Périco (born 16 November 1999) is a Peruvian professional golfer who plays on the Challenge Tour.

== Amateur career ==
Périco was educated at the Montverde Academy in Florida and played his prep career for Bishops Gate Golf Academy, where he was named Player of the Year.

Périco was runner-up at the 2016 Campeonato Sudamericano Juvenil, and won the event the next year. In 2017, he was selected to play in the Junior Golf World Cup in Japan. At the Latin America Amateur Championship, after shooting an opeinign round of 64, the lowest round in the tournament's history, finished a stroke away from joining the playoff between Toto Gana, Álvaro Ortiz, and Joaquín Niemann. In August 2018, he was ranked 9th nationwide by the AJGA.

Périco attended the University of Arkansas from 2018 to 2023. Playing with the Arkansas Razorbacks men's golf team, he set a school record winning the Jerry Pate Intercollegiate with a 54-hole score of 197, a 13-under, with rounds of 64-65-68. He scored an average of 70.16 his final year, and his career scoring average of 71.40 was second best in school history.

In 2021, Périco became the first player from Peru ever selected for the Arnold Palmer Cup, and was just the third South American.

== Professional career ==
Périco turned professional after graduating in 2023. He was runner-up in the 2023 Colombian Open, 4 strokes behind José de Jesús Rodríguez of Mexico.

In 2025, he joined the Challenge Tour, having earned status at Q-School. In his rookie season, he lost a playoff to Sebastián García Rodríguez at the Hangzhou Open in China.

In 2026, he was runner-up at the Swiss Challenge behind Matthew Southgate. At the Danish Golf Championship, where he tied for 13th, he became the first Peruvian to make the cut on the European Tour.

== Amateur wins ==
- 2016 Gira de Verano 1, Campeonato Nacional de Menores
- 2017 Campeonato Sudamericano Juvenil, IMG Academy Junior World Championship, The Memorial Junior
- 2018 AJGA Simplify Boys Championship at Carlton Woods, Jerry Pate National Intercollegiate
- 2020 Vanderbilt Legends Collegiate

== Professional wins (2) ==
=== Other wins (2) ===
- 2017 Abierto #1 – Copa Mitsubishi, Abierto de Invierno #4 (Federación Peruana de Golf events)

== Playoff record ==
Challenge Tour playoff record (0–1)

No.	Year	Tournament	Opponents	Result
1	2025	Hangzhou Open	(Spain) Sebastián García Rodríguez, (Austria) Maximilian Steinlechner	García won with par on second extra hole Steinlechner eliminated by par on first hole

== Team appearances ==
Amateur

- Junior Golf World Cup (representing Peru): 2017
- Eisenhower Trophy (representing Peru): 2016
- Arnold Palmer Cup (representing International): 2021

== See also ==
- List of International Arnold Palmer Cup golfers
