= Jeon Ji-won =

South Korean professional golfer (born 1997)

Personal information
- Nationality: South Korea
- Born: 26 May 1997 (age 29) Daegu, South Korea
- Height: 5 ft 1 in (155 cm)

Career
- Sport: Golf
- College: Daytona State College; University of Alabama
- Turned professional: 2020
- Current tour: LPGA Tour
- Former tour: Epson Tour
- Professional wins: 2

Number of wins by tour
- Epson Tour: 2

Best results in LPGA major championships
- Chevron Championship: CUT: 2025
- Women's PGA C'ship: T41: 2024
- U.S. Women's Open: T24: 2024
- Women's British Open: DNP
- Evian Championship: CUT: 2024, 2025, 2026

Jeon Ji-won (Korean: 전지원; born 26 May 1997) is a South Korean professional golfer. Jeon holds school records at the University of Alabama in women's golf. After turning professional in 2020, Jeon has gone on to play on the Epson Tour and the LPGA Tour.

== Early life ==
Jeon was born in Daegu, South Korea. At age 15, she moved to Queensland, Australia to attend Hills International College on a golf scholarship. Three years later, she moved to Florida to play golf for Daytona State College.

== Amateur career ==
In 2017, Jeon was recruited by the University of Alabama's Crimson Tide golf team. At Alabama, she became a multiple school record holder. In 2018, she was named to the International Palmer Cup team and finished second on the 2018 U.S. Women's Amateur to teammate Kristen Gillman. Also in 2018, Jeon won the Schooner Fall Classic and set an NCAA record, shooting under 200 for 54 holes. As an amateur player, Jeon ranked 6th on the World Amateur Golf Ranking.

== Professional career ==
In 2019, Jeon became the first Korean woman amateur golfer to gain an LPGA Tour card. Jeon turned professional in 2020 and played 22 events on the LPGA Tour, before joining the Epson Tour. In 2023, she won the Inova Mission Inn Resort and Club Championship and the 2023 French Lick Resort Charity Classic. In September 2023, Jeon secured a spot on the 2024 LPGA Tour.

In 2024, Jeon qualified for her second U.S. Women's Open in a qualifying round at the Rainier Golf & Country Club. In August, she made a hole-in-one while golfing at the Portland Classic. That October, she made her second hole-in-one of the season at the Buick LPGA Shanghai. In November, Jeon made her third ace of the season at The ANNIKA.

== Amateur wins ==
- 2013 Greg Norman Junior Masters
- 2016 Jacksonville Classic
- 2017 Lady Paladin Invitational, Xavier Invitational
- 2018 UNF Collegiate, SunTrust Gator Invite, Schooner Fall Classic

== Professional wins (2) ==
=== Epson Tour wins (2) ===
- 2023 Inova Mission Inn Resort & Club Championship, French Lick Charity Championship

== Results in LPGA majors ==
Results not in chronological order.

Tournament	2019	2020	2021	2022	2023	2024	2025	2026
Chevron Championship							CUT	
U.S. Women's Open	T62					T24	CUT	
Women's PGA Championship			CUT			T41	CUT	T48
The Evian Championship		NT				CUT	CUT	CUT
Women's British Open								

Did not play

CUT = missed the half-way cut
T = tied
NT = no tournament

== Team appearances ==
- Arnold Palmer Cup (representing International team): 2018 (winners), 2019 (winners)
