= Golf at the 2017 Island Games =

- Dates: 27–30 June
- Host city: Gotland, Sweden
- Venue: Slite and Visby
- Level: Senior
- Events: 4
- Participation: 105 (74 men, 31 women) athletes from 20 nations

Golf, for the 2017 Island Games, was held at the Slite and Visby golf courses, Gotland, Sweden from 27 to 30 June 2017.

== Medal table ==
* Host nation (Gotland)

Rank	Nation	Gold	Silver	Bronze	Total
1	Isle of Man	2	1	0	3
2	Gotland*	1	0	2	3
3	Åland	1	0	0	1
4	Jersey	0	2	1	3
5	Isle of Wight	0	1	1	2
Totals (5 entries)		4	4	4	12

== Results ==
Event	Gold		Silver		Bronze	
Men's individual	Alex McAuley (IOM)	299	Tom Harris (IOM)	300	Colin Daly (Gotland)	301
Men's team	Isle of Man; Daryl Cllister; Jonathan Corke; Tom Harris; Alex McAuley	900	Jersey; Alexander Guelpa; Gavin O'Neill; Matthew Parkman; Jason Stokes	916	Gotland; Filip Andersson; Colin Daly; Daniel Sojde; Måns Yttergren	926
Women's individual	Emma Lindman (ALA)	317	Flora Keites (JEY)	326	Sophie Beardsall (IOW)	327
Women's team	Gotland; Linda Helledaij; Agnes Olofsson; Lina Svegsjö; Christella Winzell	1009	Isle of Wight; Sophie Beardsall; Lucy Burke; Dawn Hodge; Samantha Keen	1019	Jersey; Juanita Adlington; Flora Keites; Helen Victoria Lagadu; Hannah Scriven	1027
