= Maddie Szeryk =

Canadian professional golfer

Personal information
- Full name: Madeline Szeryk
- Nationality: Canada
- Born: 21 July 1996 (age 30) Allen, Texas, U.S.
- Height: 5 ft 4 in (1.63 m)

Career
- Sport: Golf
- College: Texas A&M University
- Turned professional: 2018
- Current tour: LPGA Tour (joined 2022)
- Former tour: Symetra Tour (joined 2019)
- Professional wins: 2

Best results in LPGA major championships
- Chevron Championship: T18: 2023
- Women's PGA C'ship: CUT: 2023
- U.S. Women's Open: CUT: 2017
- Women's British Open: CUT: 2023
- Evian Championship: CUT: 2023

Achievements and awards
- SEC Freshman of the Year: 2015

Madeline Szeryk (born 21 July 1996) is a Canadian professional golfer on the LPGA Tour.

== Early life and amateur career ==
Szeryk was born in Allen, Texas, to parents who relocated from London, Ontario shortly after being married, and holds dual U.S. and Canadian citizenship. She got started with golf at the age of seven and was a long time member of Golf Canada's National Team Program.

Szeryk's younger sister Ellie also became an elite amateur golfer, also representing Canada internationally.

In 2013, she won the Royale Cup Canadian Junior Championship by 14 strokes over Brooke Henderson, and in 2017 she won the Women's Western Amateur. She represented Canada at the 2014 Youth Olympic Games in Nanjing and twice at the Espirito Santo Trophy.

Szeryk played collegiate golf with the Texas A&M Aggies women's golf team at Texas A&M University between 2014 and 2018. She was SEC Freshman of the Year in 2015 and a three-time All-American. She won four tournaments and made hole-in-ones in her first and last collegiate events, before playing in the 2018 Arnold Palmer Cup.

== Professional career ==
Szeryk turned professional in the fall of 2018 and joined the Symetra Tour in 2019, where her best finish was runner-up at the 2019 Zimmer Biomet Championship, two strokes behind Nuria Iturrioz of Spain. She won the 2020 Kingwood Island Championship on the Women's All Pro Tour.

In 2022, Szeryk joined the LPGA Tour after she finished T17 at LPGA Q-Series. By mid-2023, she climbed into the top-200 on the Women's World Golf Rankings for the first time after she tied for 7th at the LPGA Drive On Championship.

Half a year ahead of the 2024 Summer Olympics, Szeryk sat 50th in the qualification rankings, on course to represent Canada alongside Brooke Henderson, in competition with Maude-Aimée LeBlanc and Alena Sharp.

== Amateur wins ==
- 2011 Signsational Signs Junior
- 2013 CN Future Links Ontario Girls, Royale Cup Canadian Junior Championship
- 2014 Thunderbird International Junior
- 2015 Ontario Women's Amateur
- 2016 Seminole Match Up
- 2017 Dr Donnis Thompson Invitational, Women's Western Amateur, British Columbia Amateur
- 2018 The Bruzzy Challenge, Dale McNamara Invitational

== Professional wins (1) ==
=== Women's All Pro Tour wins (1) ===
No.	Date	Tournament	Winning score	To par	Margin of victory	Runner-up
1	11 Dec 2020	Kingwood Island Championship	69-70-67=206	−10	8 strokes	(United States) Annika Clark

=== Other wins (1) ===
- 2024 Texas Women's Open

== Results in LPGA majors ==
Results not in chronological order.

Tournament	2017	2018	2019	2020	2021	2022	2023
Chevron Championship							T18
Women's PGA Championship							CUT
U.S. Women's Open	CUT						
The Evian Championship				NT			CUT
Women's British Open							CUT

Did not play

CUT = missed the half-way cut
NT = no tournament
T = tied

== Team appearances ==
Amateur

- Youth Olympic Games (representing Canada): 2014
- Espirito Santo Trophy (representing Canada): 2016, 2018
- Arnold Palmer Cup (representing the International team): 2018
