= 2012 Palmer Cup =

Team golf competition in Northern Ireland

- Dates: 28–30 June 2012
- Venue: Royal County Down Golf Club
- Location: Newcastle, County Down, Northern Ireland
(Europe)	13½	10½	(United States)
- Europe wins the Palmer Cup

The 2012 Palmer Cup was held on 28–30 June 2012 at the Royal County Down Golf Club in Newcastle, County Down, Northern Ireland. Europe won 13½–10½. The United States led 10–6 at the start of the final day but Europe won 7 of the 8 singles matches and halved the other to win the match.

== Format ==
On Thursday, there were four matches of four-ball in the morning, followed by four foursomes matches in the afternoon. Eight singles matches were played on Friday, and eight more on Saturday. In all, 24 matches were played.

Each of the 24 matches was worth one point in the larger team competition. If a match was all square after the 18th hole, each side earned half a point toward their team total. The team that accumulated at least 12½ points won the competition.

== Teams ==
Eight college golfers from Europe and the United States participated in the event.

Europe
Name	Country	College
Rickard Lindberg head coach	Sweden	
David Ingles assistant coach	Scotland	Northwestern
David Booth	England	Stirling
Julien Brun	France	Texas Christian
Sebastian Cappelen	Denmark	Arkansas
Daan Huizing	Netherlands	Utrecht
Robert S. Karlsson	Sweden	Liberty
Thomas Pieters	Belgium	Illinois
Graeme Robertson	Scotland	Stirling
Pontus Widegren	Sweden	UCLA

United States
Name	College
Josh Gregory head coach	SMU
Christian Newton assistant coach	Georgia Tech
Blayne Barber	Auburn
Derek Ernst	UNLV
Corbin Mills	Clemson
Patrick Rodgers	Stanford
Justin Thomas	Alabama
James White	Georgia Tech
Chris Williams	Washington
Andrew Yun	Stanford

== Thursday's matches ==
=== Morning four-ball ===
	Results
Huizing/Pieters	(United States) 1 up	Williams/Yun
Brun/Cappelen	halved	Ernst/Mills
Booth/Robertson	(United States) 6 & 4	Barber/White
Karlsson/Widegren	(United States) 2 up	Rodgers/Thomas
½	Four-ball	3½
½	Overall	3½

=== Afternoon foursomes ===
	Results
Huizing/Pieters	(United States) 1 up	Ernst/Yun
Robertson/Widegren	(United States) 5 & 4	Mills/Williams
Booth/Karlsson	(Europe) 2 & 1	Barber/White
Brun/Cappelen	(United States) 1 up	Rodgers/Thomas
1	Foursomes	3
1½	Overall	6½

== Friday's singles matches ==
	Results
Graeme Robertson	(United States) 3 & 2	Chris Williams
Julien Brun	(Europe) 2 & 1	Blayne Barber
Daan Huizing	(Europe) 1 up	Corbin Mills
David Booth	(United States) 4 & 2	Andrew Yun
Thomas Pieters	halved	James White
Robert S. Karlsson	(Europe) 4 & 2	Derek Ernst
Sebastian Cappelen	halved	Justin Thomas
Pontus Widegren	halved	Patrick Rodgers
4½	Singles	3½
6	Overall	10

== Saturday's singles matches ==
	Results
Sebastian Cappelen	(Europe) 3 & 2	Chris Williams
Daan Huizing	(Europe) 4 & 3	Justin Thomas
Robert S. Karlsson	(Europe) 2 & 1	Patrick Rodgers
Thomas Pieters	halved	Corbin Mills
David Booth	(Europe) 2 up	James White
Graeme Robertson	(Europe) 2 up	Derek Ernst
Julien Brun	(Europe) 6 & 5	Blayne Barber
Pontus Widegren	(Europe) 3 & 1	Andrew Yun
7½	Singles	½
13½	Overall	10½

== Michael Carter award ==
The Michael Carter Award winners were Robert S. Karlsson and Andrew Yun.
