= 2018 Arnold Palmer Cup =

Team golf competition in France

- Dates: 6–8 July 2018
- Venue: Evian Resort Golf Club
- Location: Évian-les-Bains, France
International	21½	38½	USA
- USA wins the Arnold Palmer Cup

The 2018 Arnold Palmer Cup was a team golf competition held from 6–8 July 2018 at Evian Resort Golf Club, Évian-les-Bains, France. It was the 22nd time the event had been contested and the first under a new format in which women golfers played in addition to men and an international team, representing the rest of the world, replaced the European team. The United States won the match 38½–21½.

== Format ==
The contest was played over three days. On Friday, there were 12 mixed four-ball matches. On Saturday there were 12 mixed foursomes matches in the morning and 12 fourball matches in the afternoon, six all-women matches and six all-men matches. 24 singles matches were played on Sunday. In all, 60 matches were played.

Each of the 60 matches was worth one point in the larger team competition. If a match was all square after the 18th hole, each side earned half a point toward their team total. The team that accumulated at least 30½ points won the competition.

== Teams ==
United States
Name	College	Qualification method
Therese Hession	non-playing head coach	
Ryan Hybl	non-playing head coach	
Ryan Blagg	non-playing assistant coach	
Susan Rosenstiel	non-playing assistant coach	
Women
Jamie Freedman	Nova Southeastern	Committee selection
Mariel Galdiano	UCLA	Committee selection
Kristen Gillman	Alabama	Arnold Palmer Cup Ranking
Dylan Kim	Arkansas	Committee selection
Jennifer Kupcho	Wake Forest	Committee selection
Andrea Lee	Stanford	Arnold Palmer Cup Ranking
Emilia Migliaccio	Wake Forest	Arnold Palmer Cup Ranking
Kaitlyn Papp	Texas	Coach’s pick
Sophia Schubert	Texas	Arnold Palmer Cup Ranking
Lauren Stephenson	Alabama	Arnold Palmer Cup Ranking
Alana Uriell	Arkansas	Committee selection
Lilia Vu	UCLA	Arnold Palmer Cup Ranking
Men
Shintaro Ban	UNLV	Arnold Palmer Cup Ranking
Zach Bauchou	Oklahoma State	Committee selection
Brad Dalke	Oklahoma	Arnold Palmer Cup Ranking
Stephen Franken	NC State	Coach’s pick
S.M. Lee	Dalton State	Committee selection
Collin Morikawa	California	Arnold Palmer Cup Ranking
Chandler Phillips	Texas A&M	Committee selection
Davis Riley	Alabama	Arnold Palmer Cup Ranking
Justin Suh	Southern California	Arnold Palmer Cup Ranking
Sahith Theegala	Pepperdine	Committee selection
Braden Thornberry	Mississippi	Committee selection
Matthew Wolff	Oklahoma State	Arnold Palmer Cup Ranking

International
Name	Country	College	Qualification method
Herb Page	Canada	non-playing head coach	
Anne Walker	Scotland	non-playing head coach	
Jan Dowling	Canada	non-playing assistant coach	
Adrien Mörk	France	non-playing assistant coach	
Women
Jaravee Boonchant	Thailand	Duke	Arnold Palmer Cup Ranking
María Fassi	Mexico	Arkansas	Arnold Palmer Cup Ranking
Jeon Ji-won	South Korea	Daytona State	Committee selection
Wenyung Keh	New Zealand	Washington	Coach’s pick
Olivia Mehaffey	Northern Ireland	Arizona State	Arnold Palmer Cup Ranking
Ainhoa Olarra	Spain	South Carolina	Arnold Palmer Cup Ranking
Pimnipa Panthong	Thailand	Kent State	Committee selection
Chloe Ryan	Ireland	ISDE Madrid	R&A Foundation Scholars Tournament
Maddie Szeryk	Canada	Texas A&M	Committee selection
Patty Tavatanakit	Thailand	UCLA	Arnold Palmer Cup Ranking
Albane Valenzuela	Switzerland	Stanford	Committee selection
Dewi Weber	Netherlands	Miami (Florida)	Arnold Palmer Cup Ranking
Men
Luis Gagne	Costa Rica	LSU	Coach’s pick
Harry Hall	England	UNLV	Committee selection
Viktor Hovland	Norway	Oklahoma State	Arnold Palmer Cup Ranking
K. K. Limbhasut	Thailand	California	Committee selection
Hurly Long	Germany	Texas Tech	Committee selection
Stefano Mazzoli	Italy	TCU	Arnold Palmer Cup Ranking
Ronan Mullarney	Ireland	Maynooth	R&A Foundation Scholars Tournament
Fredrik Niléhn	Sweden	Texas Tech	Arnold Palmer Cup Ranking
Álvaro Ortiz	Mexico	Arkansas	Arnold Palmer Cup Ranking
Jovan Rebula	South Africa	Auburn	Arnold Palmer Cup Ranking
Lorenzo Scalise	Italy	Tennessee	Arnold Palmer Cup Ranking
Andy Zhang	China	Florida	Committee selection

== Friday's mixed fourball matches ==
Match	International	Results	United States
1	Mehaffey/Hovland	4 & 2	Kupcho/Wolff
2	Rebula/Valenzuela	6 & 4	Phillips/Vu
3	Long/Tavatanakit	2 & 1	Morikawa/Andrea Lee
4	Keh/Hall	2 up	Riley/Gillman
5	Weber/Mazzoli	3 & 1	Franken/Migliaccio
6	Scalise/Jeon	3 & 2	Theegala/Uriell
7	Niléhn/Boonchant	3 & 1	Freedman/Dalke
8	Limbhasut/Panthong	4 & 3	Bauchou/Kim
9	Ryan/Mullarney	2 up	S.M. Lee/Papp
10	Olarra/Gagne	1 up	Galdiano/Ban
11	Szeryk/Zhang	1 up	Stephenson/Thornberry
12	Ortiz/Fassi	2 & 1	Schubert/Suh
	4	Session	8
	4	Overall	8

== Saturday's matches ==
=== Morning mixed foursomes matches ===
Match	Tee	International	Results	United States
13	1	Rebula/Valenzuela	4 & 2	Kupcho/Wolff
14	10	Jeon/Scalise	halved	Stephenson/Thornberry
15	1	Long/Tavatanakit	halved	Phillips/Vu
16	10	Mazzoli/Weber	1 up	Andrea Lee/Morikawa
17	1	Hovland/Mehaffey	1 up	Ban/Galdiano
18	10	Mullarney/Ryan	1 up	Freedman/Theegala
19	1	Szeryk/Zhang	5 & 3	Kim/Suh
20	10	Limbhasut/Panthong	2 up	Dalke/Uriell
21	1	Gagne/Olarra	2 up	Gillman/Riley
22	10	Hall/Keh	3 & 1	Bauchou/Schubert
23	1	Fassi/Ortiz	5 & 4	Franken/Migliaccio
24	10	Boonchant/Nilhen	halved	S.M. Lee/Papp
		7½	Session	4½
		11½	Overall	12½

=== Afternoon fourball matches ===
Match	Tee	International	Results	United States
25	1	Jeon/Ryan	2 & 1	Kupcho/Vu
26	10	Mazzoli/Scalise	4 & 3	Thornberry/Wolff
27	1	Mehaffey/Szeryk	1 up	Galdiano/Andrea Lee
28	10	Gagne/Zhang	2 & 1	Ban/Morikawa
29	1	Valenzuela/Weber	3 & 2	Schubert/Stephenson
30	10	Long/Mullarney	1 up	Suh/Theegala
31	1	Keh/Tavatanakit	5 & 3	Freedman/Uriell
32	10	Hall/Rebula	3 & 2	Bauchou/Phillips
33	1	Boonchant/Panthong	1 up	Kim/Migliaccio
34	10	Limbhasut/Ortiz	5 & 4	Franken/S.M. Lee
35	1	Fassi/Olarra	5 & 4	Gillman/Papp
36	10	Hovland/Niléhn	1 up	Dalke/Riley
		4	Session	8
		15½	Overall	20½

== Sunday's singles matches ==
Match	Tee	International	Results	United States
37	1	María Fassi	2 & 1	Sophia Schubert
38	10	Viktor Hovland	2 up	Brad Dalke
39	1	Lorenzo Scalise	halved	Chandler Phillips
40	10	Olivia Mehaffey	5 & 4	Jamie Freedman
41	1	Patty Tavatanakit	halved	Kaitlyn Papp
42	10	Andy Zhang	3 & 1	Sahith Theegala
43	1	Stefano Mazzoli	6 & 5	Collin Morikawa
44	10	Jeon Ji-won	7 & 5	Andrea Lee
45	1	Maddie Szeryk	3 & 1	Lilia Vu
46	10	Luis Gagne	4 & 2	Stephen Franken
47	1	K.K. Limbhasut	4 & 3	Justin Suh
48	10	Dewi Weber	w/o	Jennifer Kupcho
49	1	Pimnipa Panthong	2 & 1	Alana Uriell
50	10	Álvaro Ortiz	1 up	Zach Bauchou
51	1	Fredrik Niléhn	3 & 2	Braden Thornberry
52	10	Chloe Ryan	2 & 1	Emilia Migliaccio
53	1	Wenyung Keh	4 & 3	Kristen Gillman
54	10	Harry Hall	2 & 1	S.M. Lee
55	1	Ronan Mullarney	2 & 1	Shintaro Ban
56	10	Albane Valenzuela	1 up	Lauren Stephenson
57	1	Jaravee Boonchant	1 up	Mariel Galdiano
58	10	Jovan Rebula	3 & 2	Davis Riley
59	1	Hurly Long	3 & 2	Matthew Wolff
60	10	Ainhoa Olarra	1 up	Dylan Kim
		6	Session	18
		21½	Overall	38½

Dewi Weber conceded her singles match because of illness.

== Michael Carter award ==
The Michael Carter Award winners were Olivia Mehaffey and Collin Morikawa.
