= Derek Ernst =

American professional golfer (born 1990)

Personal information
- Nationality: United States
- Born: May 16, 1990 (age 36) Woodland, California, U.S.
- Height: 6 ft 0 in (1.83 m)
- Weight: 185 lb (84 kg; 13.2 st)
- Spouse: Laney Ernst
- Children: 2

Career
- Sport: Golf
- College: UNLV
- Turned professional: 2012
- Current tours: PGA Tour (past champion status); Korn Ferry Tour
- Professional wins: 1

Number of wins by tour
- PGA Tour: 1

Best results in major championships
- Masters Tournament: CUT: 2014
- PGA Championship: CUT: 2013
- U.S. Open: DNP
- The Open Championship: DNP

Derek Ernst (born May 16, 1990) is an American professional golfer who plays on the PGA Tour. He earned his first PGA Tour victory at the 2013 Wells Fargo Championship.

== Early life and amateur career ==
Ernst was born in Woodland, California to Mark and Dawn Ernst. He attended Clovis East High School in Clovis, California and played college golf at UNLV, where he was a four-time All-American and was twice named Mountain West Conference player of the year. He was runner-up at the 2011 U.S. Amateur Public Links championship, losing the final on the 37th hole to Clemson's Corbin Mills. Ernst represented the United States at the 2012 Palmer Cup, and he turned pro following the 2012 U.S. Amateur.

== Professional career ==
Ernst made his professional debut at the 2012 Frys.com Open, where he finished T-41. He earned a 2013 PGA Tour card through qualifying school, surviving all four stages. He finished T-59 in his season debut at the Sony Open in Hawaii. After missing the cut in each of his next five starts, he rehired Aaron Terry, his first golf instructor, as his caddy. Ernst finished T-47 in his next event, the Zurich Classic of New Orleans. In May, he notched his first PGA Tour victory at the Wells Fargo Championship, defeating David Lynn in a playoff.

Ernst was the fourth alternate and 1,207th in the world rankings at the start of the week. He was scheduled to play on the Web.com Tour's Stadion Classic at UGA when he received a last-minute call that tee times were available; a number of golfers withdrew due to weather and unfavorable course conditions. The win also moved Ernst from 196th to 32nd in the FedEx Cup standings, and earned him entry into The Players Championship as the final guaranteed entrant, the 2013 PGA Championship, and the 2014 Masters Tournament, plus a PGA Tour exemption through 2015. Ernst was the second consecutive Q school graduate to win, following Billy Horschel's win at the Zurich Classic of New Orleans. He also skyrocketed to 123rd in the Official World Golf Ranking and was the first alternate to win a PGA Tour event since Wes Short Jr.'s victory at the 2005 Michelin Championship at Las Vegas.

== Personal life ==
Ernst has two sisters, Brianna and Shawna. He has blurry vision in his right eye as the result of an injury he sustained in the second grade. Using a children's tool set at home while making a Valentine's Day present for his mother, a shard of PVC bounced up and cut his eye, requiring 10 stitches. Scar tissue remains in the eye and his depth perception is poor.

== Professional wins (1) ==
=== PGA Tour wins (1) ===
No.	Date	Tournament	Winning score	To par	Margin of victory	Runner-up
1	May 5, 2013	Wells Fargo Championship	67-71-72-70=280	−8	Playoff	(England) David Lynn

PGA Tour playoff record (1–0)

No.	Year	Tournament	Opponent	Result
1	2013	Wells Fargo Championship	(England) David Lynn	Won with par on first extra hole

== Results in major championships ==
Tournament	2013	2014
Masters Tournament		CUT
U.S. Open		
The Open Championship		
PGA Championship	CUT	

Did not play

CUT = missed the half-way cut
"T" indicates a tie for a place

== Results in The Players Championship ==
Tournament	2013	2014
The Players Championship	CUT	CUT

CUT = missed the halfway cut

== Results in World Golf Championships ==
Tournament	2013
Match Play	
Championship	
Invitational	T57
Champions	T61

Did not play

"T" = Tied

== U.S. national team appearances ==
Amateur

- Palmer Cup: 2012

== See also ==
- 2012 PGA Tour Qualifying School graduates
- 2015 Web.com Tour Finals graduates
