= 2021 Arnold Palmer Cup =

Team golf competition in the United States

- Dates: June 11–13, 2021
- Venue: Rich Harvest Farms
- Location: Sugar Grove, Illinois
USA	33	27	International
- USA wins the Arnold Palmer Cup

The 2021 Arnold Palmer Cup was a team golf competition held from June 11–13, 2021 at Rich Harvest Farms, Sugar Grove, Illinois. It was the 25th time the event had been contested and the fourth under the new format in which women golfers played in addition to men, and the United States played an international team. The United States team won the match 33–27.

== Format ==
The contest was played over three days. On Friday, there were 12 mixed four-ball matches. On Saturday there were 24 foursomes matches, 12 in the morning, six all-women matches and six all-men matches, and 12 mixed matches in the afternoon. 24 singles matches were played on Sunday. In all, 60 matches were played.

Each of the 60 matches was worth one point in the larger team competition. If a match was all square after the 18th hole, each side earned half a point toward their team total. The team that accumulated at least 30½ points won the competition.

== Teams ==
Selection was by a committee, except for the four coaches picks, one man and woman on each team. Six committee selections for each team were announced in March 2021 with the remaining players announced in early May. The head coaches were announced in September 2020 with the assistant coaches selected in March 2021.

United States
Name	College	Qualification method
Kim Lewellen	non-playing head coach	
Greg Sands	non-playing head coach	
Jean-Paul Hebert	non-playing assistant coach	
Jon Whithaus	non-playing assistant coach	
Women
Allisen Corpuz	USC	
Hanna Harrison	Louisville	
Lauren Hartlage	Dallas Baptist	
Julia Johnson	Ole Miss	
Gina Kim	Duke	
Irene Kim	Northwestern	
Rachel Kuehn	Wake Forest	
Brooke Matthews	Arkansas	
Emilia Migliaccio	Wake Forest	Coaches pick
Erica Shepherd	Duke	
Kate Smith	Nebraska	
Latanna Stone	LSU	
Men
Sam Bennett	Texas A&M	
Jacob Bridgeman	Clemson	
Ricky Castillo	Florida	
Pierceson Coody	Texas	
Nick Gabrelcik	North Florida	
Ryan Hall	South Carolina	
Dylan Menante	Pepperdine	
William Moll	Vanderbilt	
Trevor Norby	Oklahoma Christian	
Trent Phillips	Georgia	
Brad Reeves	Arizona	
Benjamin Shipp	NC State	

International
Name	Country	College	Qualification method
Sofie Aagaard	Sweden	non-playing head coach	
J. C. Deacon	Canada	non-playing head coach	
Mikkel Bjerch-Andresen	Norway	non-playing assistant coach	
Diana Cantú	Mexico	non-playing assistant coach	
Women
Penny Brown	Scotland	Stirling	
Isabella Fierro	Mexico	Oklahoma State	
Karen Fredgaard	Sweden	Houston	
Agathe Laisné	France	Texas	
Ingrid Lindblad	Sweden	LSU	
Virunpat Olankitkunchai	Thailand	Maryland	
Ana Peláez Triviño	Spain	South Carolina	
Emily Price	England	Kent State	
Pauline Roussin-Bouchard	France	South Carolina	
Emma Spitz	Austria	UCLA	
Beatrice Wallin	Sweden	Florida State	
Lauren Walsh	Ireland	Wake Forest	
Men
Puwit Anupansuebsai	Thailand	San Diego State	
Eugenio Chacarra	Spain	Oklahoma State	
Adrien Dumont de Chassart	Belgium	Illinois	
Alex Fitzpatrick	England	Wake Forest	
Allan Hill	Ireland	Maynooth	
Jin Bo	China	Oklahoma State	
Lin Yuxin	China	Florida	
Pontus Nyholm	Sweden	Campbell	
Joe Pagdin	England	Florida	
Julián Périco	Peru	Arkansas	
David Puig	Spain	Arizona State	
Hugo Townsend	Sweden	Boise State	

== Friday's mixed fourball matches ==
Match	International	Results	United States
1	Chacarra/Fierro	5 & 3	Matthews/Menante
2	Brown/Hill	1 up	Harrison/Norby
3	Townsend/Wallin	4 & 3	Bennett/Shepherd
4	Lindblad/Nyholm	1 up	Moll/Smith
5	Pagdin/Price	1 up	Hall/Johnson
6	Anupansuebsai/Olankitkunchai	tied	Phillips/Stone
7	Dumont de Chassart/Laisné	4 & 3	Kuehn/Shipp
8	Peláez Triviño/Puig	2 & 1	Reeves/Corpuz
9	Spitz/Lin	2 & 1	Gabrelcik/Migliaccio
10	Fredgaard/Jin	4 & 3	Bridgeman/I. Kim
11	Fitzpatrick/Walsh	tied	Castillo/Hartlage
12	Périco/Roussin-Bouchard	1 up	Coody/G. Kim
	6	Session	6
	6	Overall	6

== Saturday's matches ==
=== Morning foursomes matches ===
Match	Tee	International	Results	United States
13	1	Brown/Walsh	3 & 1	Kuehn/Migliaccio
14	10	Chacarra/Lin	3 & 2	Bridgeman/Hall
15	1	Jin/Pagdin	3 & 1	Gabrelcik/Phillips
16	10	Olankitkunchai/Price	3 & 2	G. Kim/Shepherd
17	1	Fierro/Fredgaard	tied	Johnson/Stone
18	10	Hill/Périco	2 & 1	Castillo/Menante
19	1	Anupansuebsai/Dumont de Chassart	2 up	Norby/Shipp
20	10	Roussin-Bouchard/Spitz	4 & 3	Corpuz/I. Kim
21	1	Lindblad/Wallin	3 & 2	Harrison/Matthews
22	10	Nyholm/Townsend	2 & 1	Bennett/Reeves
23	1	Fitzpatrick/Puig	2 & 1	Coody/Moll
24	10	Laisné/Peláez Triviño	3 & 2	Hartlage/Smith
		6½	Session	5½
		12½	Overall	11½

=== Afternoon mixed foursomes matches ===
Match	Tee	International	Results	United States
25	1	Lindblad/Nyholm	2 & 1	Migliaccio/Gabrelcik
26	10	Fierro/Chacarra	3 & 2	Corpuz/Shipp
27	1	Wallin/Townsend	3 & 1	Hartlage/Menante
28	10	Peláez Triviño/Puig	3 & 1	Harrison/Norby
29	1	Price/Pagdin	5 & 4	Shepherd/Bennett
30	10	Olankitkunchai/Anupansuebsai	5 & 4	Smith/Reeves
31	1	Fredgaard/Jin	1 up	Matthews/Moll
32	10	Spitz/Périco	4 & 3	Johnson/Hall
33	1	Brown/Hill	5 & 4	Stone/Phillips
34	10	Laisné/Dumont de Chassart	2 & 1	I. Kim/Bridgeman
35	1	Roussin-Bouchard/Lin	tied	Kuehn/Castillo
36	10	Walsh/Fitzpatrick	2 & 1	G. Kim/Coody
		3½	Session	8½
		16	Overall	20

== Sunday's singles matches ==
Match	Tee	International	Results	United States
37	1	Ana Peláez Triviño	3 & 2	Gina Kim
38	10	David Puig	3 & 2	Dylan Menante
39	1	Alex Fitzpatrick	2 & 1	Jacob Bridgeman
40	10	Emma Spitz	1 up	Julia Johnson
41	1	Beatrice Wallin	4 & 3	Irene Kim
42	10	Julián Périco	5 & 3	William Moll
43	1	Adrien Dumont de Chassart	4 & 3	Trent Phillips
44	10	Isabella Fierro	2 & 1	Kate Smith
45	1	Lauren Walsh	2 & 1	Rachel Kuehn
46	10	Puwit Anupansuebsai	7 & 5	Benjamin Shipp
47	1	Lin Yuxin	1 up	Ryan Hall
48	10	Virunpat Olankitkunchai	tied	Emilia Migliaccio
49	1	Penny Brown	4 & 2	Allisen Corpuz
50	10	Hugo Townsend	tied	Sam Bennett
51	1	Pontus Nyholm	2 & 1	Trevor Norby
52	10	Emily Price	4 & 3	Hanna Harrison
53	1	Karen Fredgaard	2 & 1	Latanna Stone
54	10	Joe Pagdin	2 & 1	Ricky Castillo
55	1	Eugenio Chacarra	3 & 1	Pierceson Coody
56	10	Agathe Laisné	1 up	Brooke Matthews
57	1	Pauline Roussin-Bouchard	3 & 2	Erica Shepherd
58	10	Jin Bo	3 & 2	Brad Reeves
59	1	Allan Hill	3 & 2	Nick Gabrelcik
60	10	Ingrid Lindblad	1 up	Lauren Hartlage
		11	Session	13
		27	Overall	33

== Michael Carter award ==
The Michael Carter Award winners were Sam Bennett and Jin Bo.
