= Andy Zhang =

Chinese golfer

Personal information
- Nationality: China
- Born: 14 December 1997 (age 28) Beijing, China
- Height: 6 ft 0 in (1.83 m)
- Weight: 185 lb (84 kg; 13.2 st)

Career
- Sport: Golf
- College: University of Florida
- Turned professional: 2018
- Current tour: Korn Ferry Tour

Best results in major championships
- Masters Tournament: DNP
- PGA Championship: DNP
- U.S. Open: CUT: 2012
- The Open Championship: DNP

Andy Zhang (born 14 December 1997) is a Chinese professional golfer who spent much of his childhood in Beijing, China. He first became interested in golf at age six, and began working with a coach at age seven. At the age of ten, he moved to Bradenton, Florida in the United States to pursue golf. After professional golfer Paul Casey withdrew from the 2012 U.S. Open due to an injury, Zhang, who became an alternate after performing well in sectional qualifying, was put into the field for the Open, one of the four men's major golf championships. He is the youngest player to ever participate in the U.S. Open at the age of 14. On 6 January 2015, Zhang, a Class of 2016 recruit, verbally committed to play college golf for the University of Florida, picking the Gators over Oklahoma State, Texas and Florida State, among others.

Zhang reached #7 in the World Amateur Golf Ranking before relinquishing his amateur status, turning professional in 2018.

== Amateur wins ==
- 2014 Thunderbird International Junior
- 2016 CB&I – Simplify Boys Championship, Azalea Invitational
- 2018 SEC Championship, NCAA Reunion Regional

== Results in major championships ==
Tournament	2012
Masters Tournament	
U.S. Open	CUT
The Open Championship	
PGA Championship	

Did not play

CUT = missed the half-way cut

== Team appearances ==
- Arnold Palmer Cup (representing the International team): 2018
