= Lin Yuxin =

Chinese professional golfer

Personal information
- Nationality: China
- Born: 12 October 2000 (age 26) China

Career
- Sport: Golf
- College: University of Southern California; University of Florida
- Turned professional: 2023

Best results in major championships
- Masters Tournament: CUT: 2018, 2020
- PGA Championship: DNP
- U.S. Open: DNP
- The Open Championship: T74: 2021

Lin Yuxin (born 12 October 2000) is a Chinese professional golfer.

Aged 17, he qualified directly for both the 2018 Masters and the 2018 Open Championship as the 2017 Asia-Pacific Amateur champion. Playing in the first two rounds of the 2018 Masters at Augusta, Lin scored 79 and 80 for 15-over-par, which meant he missed the cut and did not qualify for the last two rounds. In the 2018 Open Championship at Carnoustie, he scored 80 and 74 for 12-over-par in the first two rounds, again missing the cut.

Lin was the first winner of the Asia-Pacific to receive a direct invitation to both the Masters and The Open Championship. Previously the winner had received an invitation to the Masters but it was only starting in 2018 that the winner also had an automatic Open entry.

In 2019, Lin won the Asia-Pacific Amateur Championship for a second time.

Lin turned professional in 2023.

== Amateur wins ==
- 2015 China Amateur Futures Tour Final
- 2017 Asia-Pacific Amateur Championship
- 2019 Asia-Pacific Amateur Championship
- 2020 Southern Highlands Collegiate
- 2023 Southern Highlands Collegiate

== Results in major championships ==
Results not in chronological order.

Tournament	2018	2019	2020	2021
Masters Tournament	CUT		CUT	
PGA Championship				
U.S. Open				
The Open Championship	CUT		NT	T74

Did not play

CUT = missed the half way cut
NT = No tournament due to COVID-19 pandemic

== Team appearances ==
- Arnold Palmer Cup (representing the International team): 2020 (winners), 2021
