= Church (surname) =

Church is an English surname. Notable people with the surname include:

- Albert T. Church (born 1947), vice-admiral in the United States Navy
- Alfred John Church (1829–1912), English classical scholar
- Alonzo Church (1903–1995), logician, famous for the Church-Turing thesis and lambda calculus
- Arthur Harry Church (1865–1937), British botanist and botanical illustrator
- Arthur Herbert Church (1834–1915), British chemist
- Austin Church (1799–1879), American physician and entrepreneur
- Captain Benjamin Church (1639–1718), colonial officer during King Philip's War
- Benjamin Church (physician) (1734–1776), first Surgeon General of the Continental Army and grandson of Captain Benjamin Church
- Benjamin Church (carpenter) (1807–1887), American pioneer and builder of Milwaukee, Wisconsin
- Bethine Clark Church (1923–2013), spouse of American senator Frank Church
- Brad Church (born 1976), Canadian ice hockey player
- Charlotte Church (born 1986), Welsh soprano singer and talk show host
- Doug Church (born 1968), video-game designer
- Elihu Dwight Church (1836–1908), American book collector and philanthropist
- Ellen Church (1904–1965), first airline stewardess
- Eric Church (born 1977), American country music singer
- Forrest Church (1948–2009), American minister, son of Senator Frank Church
- Francis Pharcellus Church (1839–1906), American writer (famous for the editorial Yes, Virginia, there is a Santa Claus)
- Frank Church (1924–1984), four-term U.S. Senator from Idaho.
- Frederic Edwin Church (1826–1900), landscape painter
- Frederic A. Church (1878–1936), American engineer and early roller coaster designer.
- Frederick Stuart Church (1842–1924), American artist.
- George Church (geneticist) (born 1954), Harvard geneticist, molecular engineer, and chemist, founder of the Personal Genome Project.
- George W. Church Sr. (1903–1956), founder of Church's Chicken, a chain of franchised fried chicken restaurants
- Gerald Church (1928–2021), Scottish footballer
- Gordon Church (1960–1988), American gay murder victim
- Henry Church (1880–1947), American writer
- Henry Church (politician) (died 1850), American politician from Pennsylvania
- Kenneth Church (1930–2020), Canadian jockey
- James E. Church (1869–1959), American scientist
- John A. Church (born 1951), an expert on sea-level and its changes
- Judith Church (born 1953), a politician in the United Kingdom
- Leonard C. Church (1846–1915), American businessman, farmer, and politician
- Louis K. Church (1845–1898), New York Supreme Court justice
- Mary Church Terrell (1863–1954), American writer and civil-rights activist
- Maureen Elizabeth Church (born 1930), Welsh botanist and botanical illustrator
- Michael Church, Grenadian politician
- Mike Church (born 1962), a Southern United States radio commentator
- Richard Church (general) (1784–1873), a British military officer and general in the Greek army
- Richard William Church (1825–1890), an English divine, nephew of the general
- Richard Church (poet) (1893–1972), an English poet and man of letters
- Robert Reed Church (1839–1912), the first African-American millionaire
- Rosemary Church, (born 1962), TV anchor
- Ryan Church (born 1978), an American baseball player
- Simon Church (born 1988), Welsh international footballer
- Thomas Church (1798–1860), a British colonial administrator under the British East India Company
- Thomas Church (landscape architect) (1902–1978), American landscape architect
- Thomas Haden Church (born 1961), American actor in television and film
- Thomas Langton Church (1870–1950), Canadian politician
- Walter G. Church Sr. (1927–2012), member of the North Carolina General Assembly
- William Church (c. 1778 – 1863), American inventor who patented a typesetting machine in 1822
