= Henry Church (disambiguation) =

Henry Church may refer to:

- Henry Church (politician) (c. 1819-1950), American politician
- Henry Church (1880-1947), American writer
- Harry Church (1904-1984), Henry Boyce Church, English footballer, see List of Oldham Athletic A.F.C. players (25–99 appearances)
