= M. E. Church =

M. E. Church may refer to:

- Mary Eliza Church (1863–1954), American civil rights activist, journalist, and teacher
- Maureen Elizabeth Church (born 1930), Welsh botanist and botanical illustrator
- Methodist Episcopal Church, a former Methodist denomination in the United States

== See also ==
- Church (surname)
