= Charles Lawrie =

Scottish golfer, administrator, and golf course architect

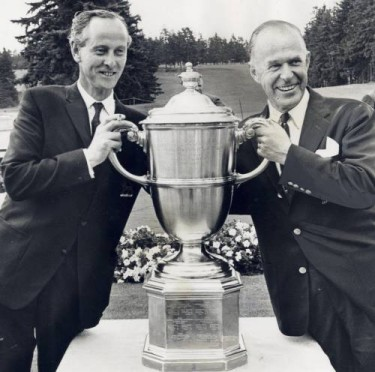
Charles D. Lawrie, left, non-playing captain of the Great Britain team at the 1961 Walker Cup, with Jack Westland, right, America's non-playing captain

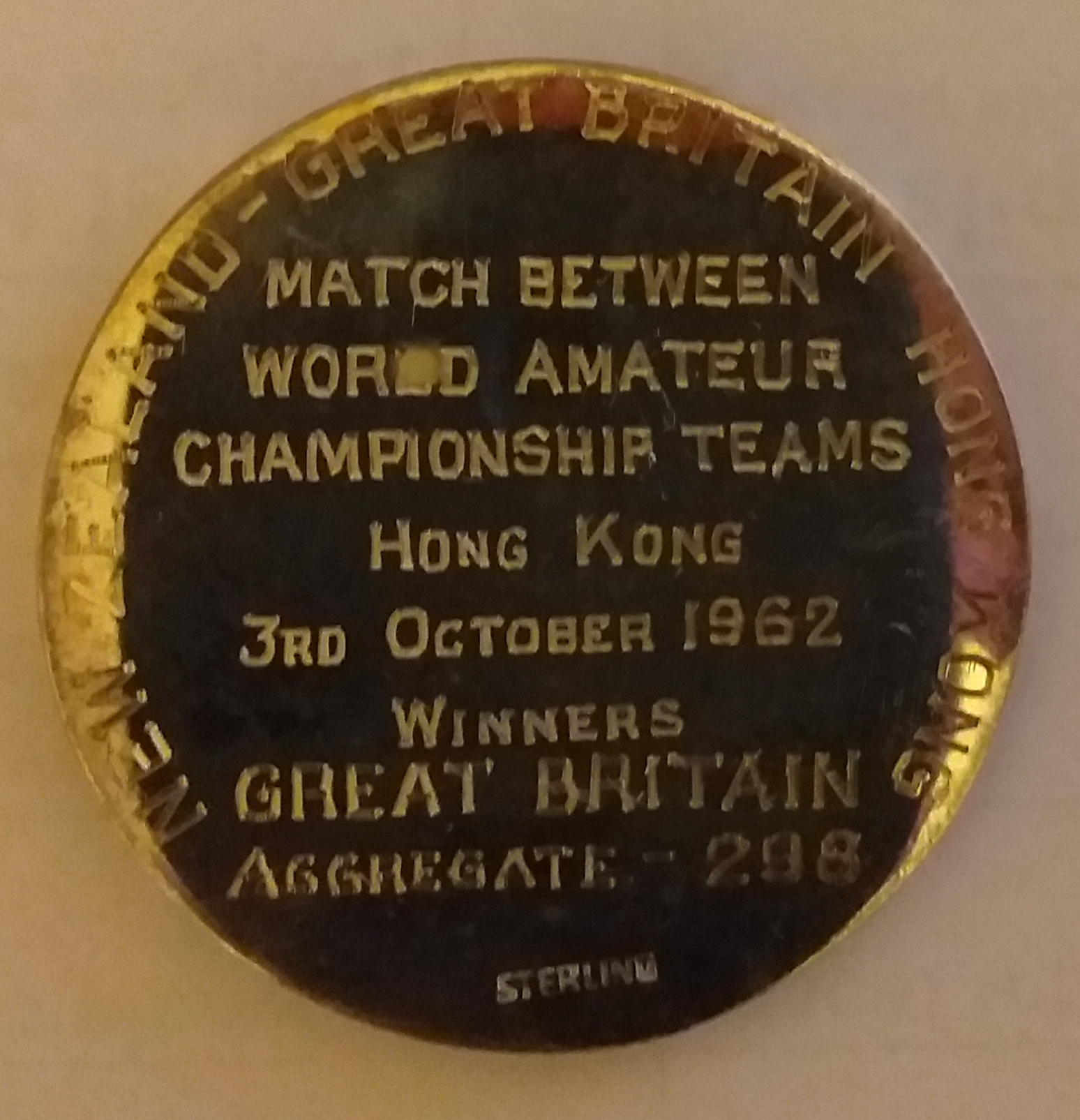
World Amateur Championship Match between New Zealand and Great Britain, played in Hong Kong in 1962

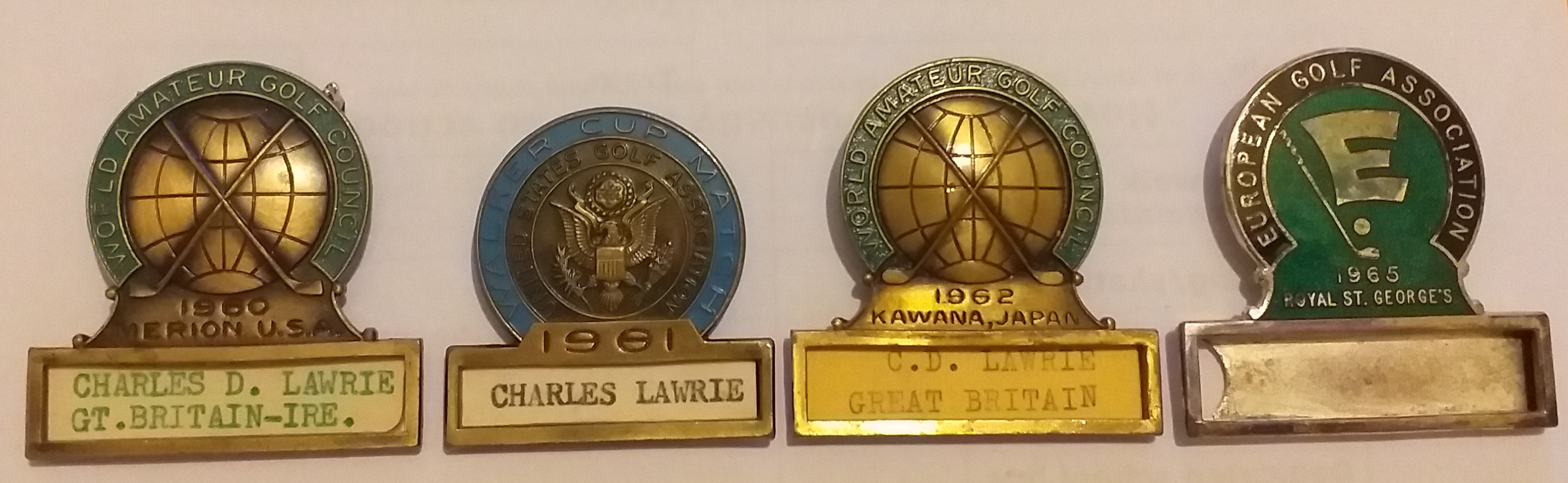
Various amateur match badges

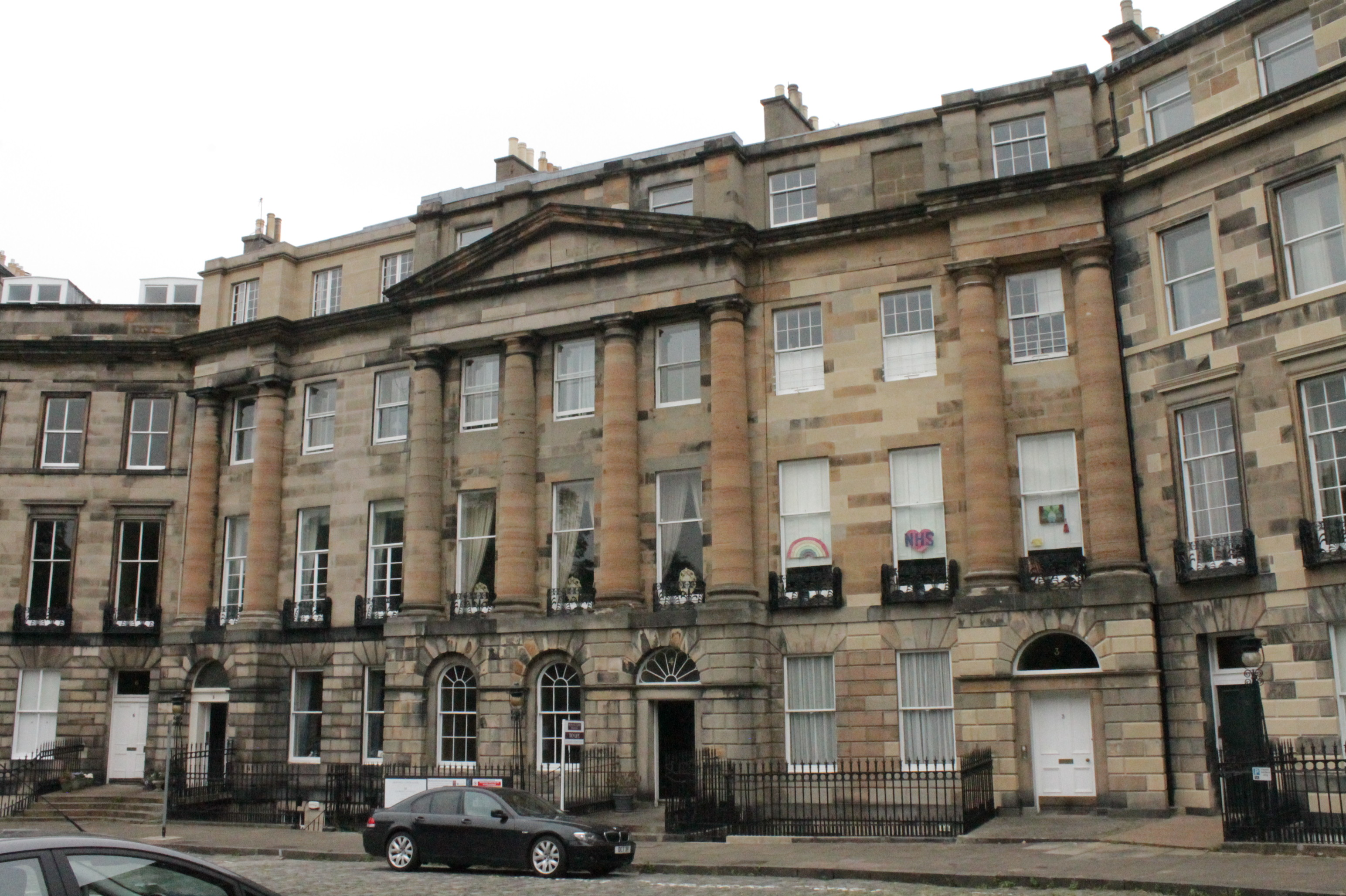
3,4,5 Moray Place

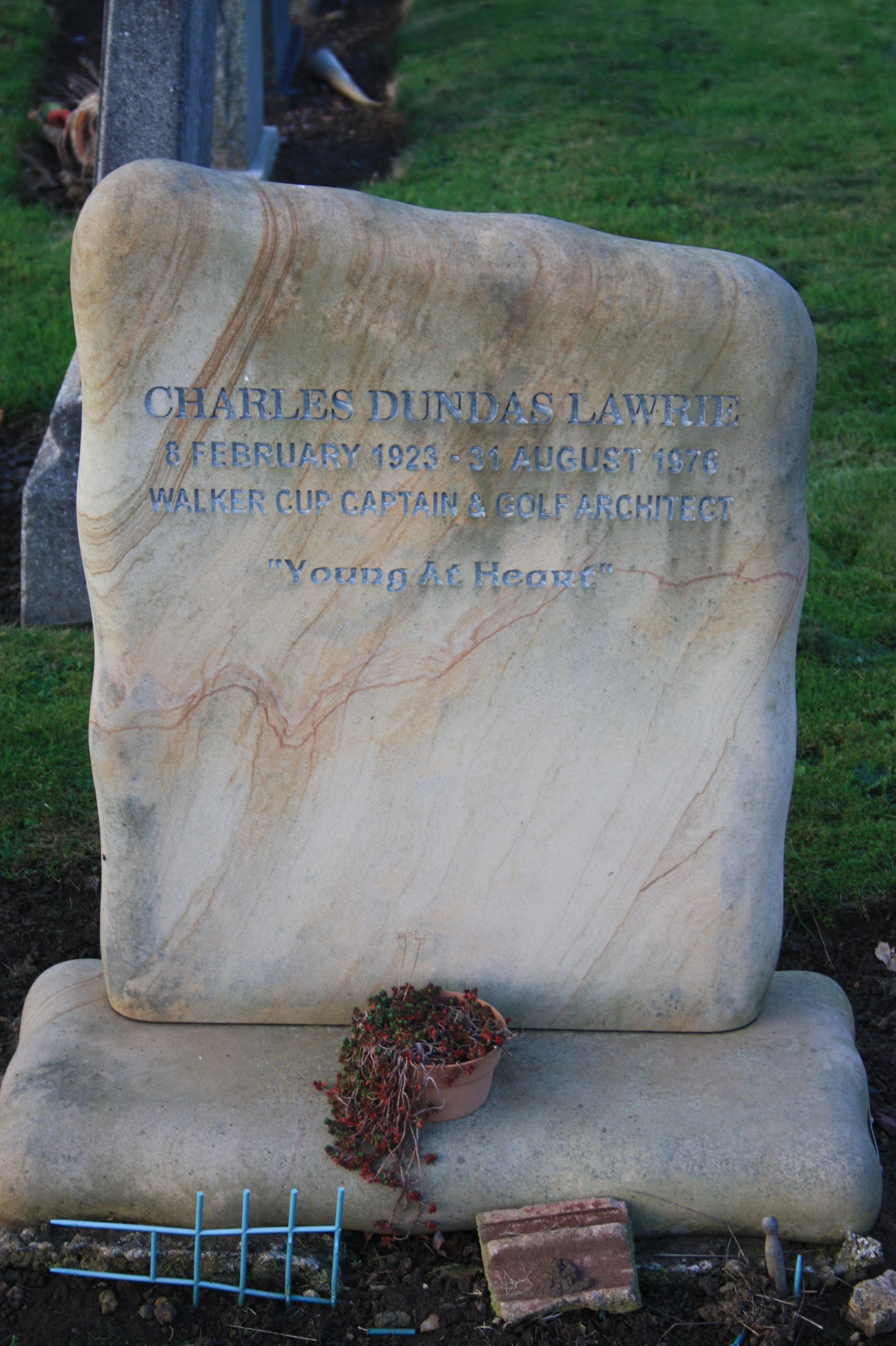
The grave of Charles Dundas Lawrie, North Berwick Cemetery

Charles Dundas Lawrie (8 February 1923 – 31 August 1976) was a Scottish amateur golfer, administrator, and golf course architect. He was described as one of golf architecture's finest representatives.

== Personal life ==
Lawrie was born on 8 February 1923, in Edinburgh, son of Alfred Lawrie, a stockbroker and president of the Scottish Rugby Union, and Jean Maxwell Lawrie (née Cook). The family lived at 5 Moray Place on the prestigious Moray Estate in west Edinburgh. His father was partner in Lawrie & Ker of 4 St Andrew Square.

He and his family moved to North Berwick where he learned to play golf, winning the Elco Medal in 1937 at the children's course at North Berwick Golf Club. He won the Gold Medal at a junior tournament at Carnoustie in 1939. He was educated at Fettes and Oxford, where 'he was a cricket star'. Whilst at Oxford University he gained five "Blues" in different sports. His cousin, James Haldane Lawrie, was a businessman, financier and patron of the arts. James was Chairman of the English Opera Group, and Benjamin Britten dedicated The Beggar's Opera (1948) to him.

Charles fought in World War II as a 2nd Lt. in the Coldstream Guards. As Sheriff of Anglesey, he took part in the Queen's coronation visit in 1953 in Caernarvon Castle. He died aged only 53 in his birthplace, Edinburgh. He is buried in North Berwick Cemetery. The grave lies near the south-west corner.

== Playing and administrative career ==
Lawrie competed as an amateur in The Open Championship in 1955 and 1957. He was the non-playing captain of the Great Britain and Ireland team in the 1960 and 1962 Eisenhower Trophy, and the non-playing captain of the Great Britain and Ireland Walker Cup team in 1961 and 1963; teams which included Michael Bonallack and Joe Carr. The 1961 American team included a young Jack Nicklaus, playing well enough to ensure a dominant victory that year. It was much closer the next time the two teams met.

In the 1960s and 1970s, Lawrie held various posts with the Royal & Ancient, including Chairman of the Amateur Status Committee, Deputy Chairman and Chairman of the Championship Committee, and Chairman of the Selection Committee. He was president of the National Golf Club's Advisory Association in the mid-1970s. In "Palmer's Open" in 1962, Lawrie was referee for the final round pairing between Arnold Palmer and Kel Nagle. James Cusick of The Independent reports how the crowd were so fierce that year at Royal Troon that at the 15th, Lawrie was 'knocked head-first into a bunker during one of the crowd's surges'.

== Golf architecture ==
Lawrie went on to design golf courses as a partner of the golf architecture firm "Cotton Pennink Lawrie & Partners", which designed golf courses around the world. He designed the Duke's Course (1976), the location of the British Masters for 20 years, and the Duchess' course (1978) at Woburn Golf Club. The Duke's course has been described by Today's Golfer as a masterpiece, and regularly appears in the top 100 ranked courses in Great Britain and Ireland.

=== Golf courses designed by C.D. Lawrie ===
- 'The Old Links' at Ballyliffin Golf Club (also designed by Eddie Hackett and Frank Pennink and Nick Faldo)
- Baron Hill, Anglesey
- Fleming Park Golf Club
- Haverhill Golf Club (also designed by Philip Pilgrey)
- Keerbergen Golf Club
- Southwick Park Golf Club
- Stockwood Park Golf Centre
- Westhill Golf Club
- Winter Hill Golf Club
- Woburn Golf Club (Duke's & Duchess' courses)
