= Spring 1980 PGA Tour Qualifying School graduates =

This is a list of the Spring 1980 PGA Tour Qualifying School graduates.

#	Player	Notes
1	(United States) Jack Spradlin	
2	(United States) Mike Gove	
3	(United States) Vance Heafner	Winner of 1977 Porter Cup
T4	(United States) Robert Seligman	
	(United States) Jimmy Powell	
	(United States) Wren Lum	
T7	(United States) Bob Pancratz	
	(United States) Jim Barber	
T9	(United States) Sale Omohundro	
	(United States) David Brownlee	
	(United States) David Thore	
T12	(United States) Bill Loeffler	
	(United States) Mike Smith	
T14	(United States) Dennis Trixler	
	(United States) Dave Fowler	
	(United States) Mark Rohde	
T17	(United States) R. W. Eaks	
	(United States) Mike Holland	Winner of 1976 South Carolina Open
	(United States) Bill Lytle	
	(United States) Gary Hardin	
T21	(South Africa) Jeff Hawkes	
	(United States) Mike Klein	
	(United States) Mike Harmon	
	(United States) Barry Harwell	
	(United States) Clint Doyle	
	(United States) Charlie Gibson	
	(United States) Bill Britton	Winner of 1975 and 1976 Metropolitan Amateur
