= Buddy Alexander =

American golf coach (born 1953)

Personal information
- Nationality: United States
- Born: February 20, 1953 (age 73) St. Petersburg, Florida, U.S.

Career
- Sport: Golf
- College: Georgia Southern

Best results in major championships
- Masters Tournament: CUT: 1987, 1988
- PGA Championship: DNP
- U.S. Open: CUT: 1987, 1994
- The Open Championship: DNP

Buddy Alexander
Coaching career (HC unless noted)
- 1977–1980: Georgia Southern
- 1983–1987: LSU
- 1988–2014: Florida

Accomplishments and honors

Championships
- NCAA (1993, 2001); Southeastern Conference (1986, 1987, 1989, 1991, 1992, 1993, 1994, 1999, 2003, 2011)

Awards
- All-American (1974, 1975); Southeastern Conference Coach of the Year (1986, 1991, 1993, 1994, 1999, 2003, 2004); Golfweek National Coach of the Year (1993); GCAA National Coach of the Year (1993, 2001, 2004); GCAA Coaches Hall of Fame (2001)

Stewart Murray Alexander (born February 20, 1953), nicknamed Buddy Alexander, is an American former college golf coach and amateur golfer. Alexander is the former head coach of the Florida Gators men's golf team. He is best known for coaching the Gators to National Collegiate Athletic Association (NCAA) Division I tournament championships in 1993 and 2001.

== Early life ==
Alexander was born in St. Petersburg, Florida. His father, Skip Alexander, was a former Duke University golf stand-out and PGA Tour player.

== Amateur career ==
Alexander graduated from Georgia Southern University with bachelor's degree in recreation in 1975, and again with a master's degree in educational administration in 1980.

During his collegiate playing career at Georgia Southern University, Alexander was recognized as an All-American in 1974 and 1975. After his graduation from Georgia Southern, he continued to play competitive golf as an amateur, and notably won the 1976 Azalea Invitational, the 1977 Eastern Amateur, and the 1986 U.S. Amateur. He was a member of the 1986 Eisenhower Trophy team and the 1987 Walker Cup team.

== Coaching career ==
Alexander served as the Florida Gators men's golf head coach from January 1988 to April 2014. Alexander's Gators teams have won two National Collegiate Athletic Association (NCAA) tournament championships in 1993 and 2001. During the 2001 NCAA tournament, Alexander also coached team captain Nick Gilliam to an individual NCAA golf championship, only the second in the history of the Gators golf program. His teams have also won 10 Southeastern Conference (SEC) team championships (1986, 1987, 1989, 1991, 1992, 1993, 1994, 1999, 2003, 2011), and his players have won eight SEC individual titles, in his twenty-two seasons as the Gators' coach.

Alexander previously coached the men's and women's golf teams at Louisiana State University (LSU) from 1983 to 1987, and the men's golf team at Georgia Southern University from 1977 to 1980. Alexander became the head golf coach at his alma mater, Georgia Southern, in 1977, only two years after his graduation. As the LSU men's and women's golf head coach, Alexander's teams won two SEC team titles (1986, 1987), and his LSU players won two SEC individual titles.

In thirty-seven years as a head coach, Alexander's teams finished among the top ten in the NCAA tournament fifteen times. His teams amassed seventy-two tournament victories, and thirty-one of his players earned All-American honors. The Golf Coaches Association of America (GCAA) honored him as its National Coach of the Year three times (1993, 2001 and 2004), and the GCAA inducted him into its Coaches Hall of Fame in 2001, joining former Gators coach Buster Bishop. The SEC recognized him seven times as its Coach of the Year (1986, 1991, 1993, 1994, 1999, 2003, 2004). As of 2010, Alexander had coached thirty-three future professional golfers as collegians, including eighteen at Florida.

In 2005, Alexander was selected to coach the U.S. national amateur team in Palmer Cup competition.

In 2013, Alexander's Gator golfers finished fourth of fourteen teams in the SEC championship tournament in Sea Island, Georgia, and twenty-fifth of thirty invited teams at the NCAA Tournament in Woodstock, Georgia.

== Personal life ==
Alexander is married to Joan. His wife previously worked as a PGA Tour media official.

Alexander has a daughter, Cortnee, and a son, Tyson. Tyson played for his father's Gators golf from 2006 to 2010, and qualified for the U.S. Open, like his father and grandfather before him, in 2009. Tyson turned pro in 2010.

== Results in major championships ==
Tournament	1987	1988	1989	1990	1991	1992	1993	1994
Masters Tournament	CUT	CUT						
U.S. Open	CUT							CUT

- Note: Alexander only played in the Masters and the U.S. Open.
- Did not play
- CUT = missed the half-way cut

== U.S. national team appearances ==
Amateur

- Eisenhower Trophy: 1986
- Walker Cup: 1987 (winners)

== See also ==
- Florida Gators
- History of the University of Florida
- List of American Walker Cup golfers
- List of Georgia Southern University alumni
- Mimi Ryan
- University Athletic Association
