= Walt Disney World Golf Classic =

Golf tournament on the PGA Tour

Tournament information
- Location: Lake Buena Vista, Florida
- Established: 1971
- Courses: Walt Disney World Resort (Magnolia & Palm courses)
- Par: 72
- Length: 7,516 yards (6,873 m) (Magnolia); 6,957 yards (6,361 m) (Palm)
- Tour: PGA Tour
- Format: Stroke play
- Prize fund: US$4,700,000
- Month played: November
- Final year: 2012

Tournament record score
- Aggregate: Individual: 262 John Huston (1992); 262 Duffy Waldorf (2000); Team: 246 Vance Heafner and Mike Holland (1981)
- To par: Individual: −26 as above Team: −42 as above

Final champion
- (United States) Charlie Beljan
- Location in the United States Location in Florida

The Walt Disney World Golf Classic was an annual golf tournament on the PGA Tour. The tournament was played on the Palm and Magnolia courses at the Walt Disney World Resort. It was played under several names, reflecting sponsorship changes.

The tournament was founded in 1971 as the Walt Disney World Open Invitational. From 1974 to 1981, the tournament was played as a two-man team event with a better-ball format. Title sponsors have included Oldsmobile, National Car Rental, Funai, and Children's Miracle Network.

From 2007 to 2012, it was the final event in the PGA Tour Fall Series, and also the final official event of the PGA Tour season. As such, it was a final chance for many players to earn or retain a PGA Tour card through winning or getting into the top 125 on the Tour's money list. The 2010 and 2012 winners, Robert Garrigus and Charlie Beljan respectively, were both outside the top 125 before their wins.

The tournament was removed from the PGA Tour schedule for the 2013–14 wrap-around season after Children's Miracle Network declined to renew their sponsorship and no others were found.

The 2012 purse was $4,700,000, with $846,000 going to the winner.

== Television ==
The event was televised by ESPN and ABC Sports, until the demotion of the event to the Fall Series in 2007, when it was relegated to cable-only on the Golf Channel. While ESPN and ABC, which are owned by Disney, covered both courses as a form of publicity for both, the Golf Channel covered only the Magnolia course with highlight packages sent in from the Palm. However, this is the manner in which the network has always covered tournaments with multiple venues.

== Courses ==
The Magnolia Course at Walt Disney World is known as more "tour"-style than its sister the Palm Course. The Palm course is known as the prettier of the two, however. In the 2006 telecast, one commentator is quoted as saying that the Palm course has the better greens of the two courses. The Magnolia has grown to 7,516 yards to battle the usual low scores during the tournament's history.

The nearby Lake Buena Vista golf course has also been part of the tournament, along with the Palm and Magnolia.

== Winners ==
Year	Winner(s) (Note: Between 1974–1981, the Walt Disney World Golf Classic was a two-player team event.)	Score	To par	Margin of victory	Runner(s)-up	Winner's share ($)
Children's Miracle Network Hospitals Classic
2012	(United States) Charlie Beljan	272	−16	2 strokes	(United States) Matt Every (United States) Robert Garrigus	846,000
2011	(England) Luke Donald	271	−17	2 strokes	(United States) Justin Leonard	846,000
Children's Miracle Network Classic
2010	(United States) Robert Garrigus	267	−21	3 strokes	(United States) Roland Thatcher	846,000
2009	(Canada) Stephen Ames (2)	270	−18	Playoff	(United States) Justin Leonard (United States) George McNeill	846,000
2008	(United States) Davis Love III	263	−25	1 stroke	(United States) Tommy Gainey	828,000
2007	(Canada) Stephen Ames	271	−17	1 stroke	(South Africa) Tim Clark	828,000
Funai Classic at the Walt Disney World Resort
2006	(United States) Joe Durant	263	−25	4 strokes	(United States) Frank Lickliter (United States) Troy Matteson	828,000
2005	(United States) Lucas Glover	265	−23	1 stroke	(United States) Tom Pernice Jr.	792,000
2004	(United States) Ryan Palmer	266	−22	3 strokes	(United States) Briny Baird (Fiji) Vijay Singh	756,000
2003	(Fiji) Vijay Singh	265	−23	4 strokes	(United States) Stewart Cink (United States) Scott Verplank (United States) Tiger Woods	720,000
Disney Golf Classic
2002	(United States) Bob Burns	263	−25	1 stroke	(United States) Chris DiMarco	666,000
National Car Rental Golf Classic Disney
2001	(Argentina) José Cóceres	265	−23	1 stroke	(United States) Davis Love III	612,000
2000	(United States) Duffy Waldorf	262	−26	1 stroke	(United States) Steve Flesch	540,000
1999	(United States) Tiger Woods (2)	271	−17	1 stroke	(South Africa) Ernie Els	450,000
1998	(United States) John Huston (2)	272	−16	1 stroke	(United States) Davis Love III	360,000
Walt Disney World/Oldsmobile Classic
1997	(United States) David Duval	270	−18	Playoff	(United States) Dan Forsman	270,000
1996	(United States) Tiger Woods	267	−21	1 stroke	(United States) Payne Stewart	216,000
1995	(United States) Brad Bryant	198 (Note: Shortened to 54 holes due to rain.)	−18	1 stroke	(United States) Hal Sutton (United States) Ted Tryba	216,000
1994	(United States) Rick Fehr	269	−19	2 strokes	(United States) Craig Stadler (United States) Fuzzy Zoeller	198,000
1993	(United States) Jeff Maggert	265	−23	3 strokes	(United States) Greg Kraft	198,000
1992	(United States) John Huston	262	−26	3 strokes	(United States) Mark O'Meara	180,000
1991	(United States) Mark O'Meara	267	−21	1 stroke	(United States) David Peoples	180,000
1990	(United States) Tim Simpson (2)	264	−24	1 stroke	(United States) John Mahaffey	180,000
1989	(United States) Tim Simpson	272	−16	1 stroke	(United States) Donnie Hammond	144,000
1988	(United States) Bob Lohr	263	−25	Playoff	(United States) Chip Beck	126,000
1987	(United States) Larry Nelson (2)	268	−20	1 stroke	(United States) Morris Hatalsky (United States) Mark O'Meara	108,000
1986	(United States) Raymond Floyd	275	−13	Playoff	(United States) Lon Hinkle (United States) Mike Sullivan	90,000
1985	(United States) Lanny Wadkins	267	−21	1 stroke	(United States) Mike Donald (United States) Scott Hoch	72,000
Walt Disney World Golf Classic
1984	(United States) Larry Nelson	266	−22	1 stroke	(United States) Hubert Green	72,000
1983	(United States) Payne Stewart	269	−19	2 strokes	(England) Nick Faldo (United States) Mark McCumber	72,000
1982	(United States) Hal Sutton	269	−19	Playoff	(United States) Bill Britton	72,000
Walt Disney World National Team Championship
1981	(United States) Vance Heafner and (United States) Mike Holland	246	−42	5 strokes	(United States) Chip Beck and (United States) Rex Caldwell	36,000 (each)
1980	(United States) Danny Edwards and (United States) David Edwards	253	−35	2 strokes	(United States) Gibby Gilbert and (United States) Grier Jones (Canada) Dan Halldorson and (United States) Dana Quigley (United States) Mike Harmon and (United States) Barry Harwell	31,500 (each)
1979	(United States) George Burns and (United States) Ben Crenshaw	255	−33	3 strokes	(United States) Peter Jacobsen and (United States) D. A. Weibring (United States) Jeff Hewes and (United States) Sammy Rachels (United States) Scott Bess and (Canada) Dan Halldorson	22,500 (each)
1978	(United States) Wayne Levi and (United States) Bob Mann	254	−34	3 strokes	(United States) Bobby Wadkins and (United States) Lanny Wadkins	20,000 (each)
1977	(United States) Gibby Gilbert and (United States) Grier Jones	253	−35	1 stroke	(United States) Steve Melnyk and (United States) Andy North	20,000 (each)
1976	(United States) Woody Blackburn and (United States) Billy Kratzert	260	−28	Playoff	(United States) Gay Brewer and (United States) Bobby Nichols	20,000 (each)
1975	(United States) Jim Colbert and (United States) Dean Refram	252	−36	3 strokes	(South Africa) Bobby Cole and (United States) John Schlee (Mexico) Victor Regalado and (United States) Charlie Sifford	20,000 (each)
1974	(United States) Hubert Green and (United States) Mac McLendon	255	−33	1 stroke	(United States) Sam Snead and (United States) J. C. Snead (United States) Ed Sneed and (United States) Bert Yancey	25,000 (each)
Walt Disney World Golf Classic
1973	(United States) Jack Nicklaus (3)	275	−13	1 stroke	(United States) Mason Rudolph	30,000
Walt Disney World Open Invitational
1972	(United States) Jack Nicklaus (2)	267	−21	9 strokes	(United States) Jim Dent (United States) Bobby Mitchell (United States) Larry Wood	30,000
1971	(United States) Jack Nicklaus	273	−15	3 strokes	(United States) Deane Beman	30,000
