= Joseph Dey =

Joe Dey

1st Commissioner of the PGA Tour
- In office 1969 – January 1, 1974
- Preceded by: Office established
- Succeeded by: Deane Beman

Personal details
- Born: Joseph Charles Dey Jr. November 17, 1907 Norfolk, Virginia, U.S.
- Died: March 3, 1991 (aged 83) Locust Valley, New York, U.S.
- Spouse(s): Rosalie Knapp Dey (m. 1933−1990, her death)
- Children: 1 son
- Education: University of Pennsylvania
- Occupation: USGA Executive Director (1934–1968); PGA Tour Commissioner (1969–1974)
- Military career
- Branch: United States Navy
- Conflicts: World War II

Joseph Charles Dey Jr. (November 17, 1907 – March 3, 1991) was an American golf administrator and a member of the World Golf Hall of Fame.

== Early life ==
Born in Norfolk, Virginia, Dey grew up in New Orleans, Louisiana, and attended the University of Pennsylvania in Philadelphia. A skilled amateur golfer, Dey dropped out of college to become a sportswriter for New Orleans and Philadelphia newspapers and magazines. He eventually specialized in golf, and covered the final leg of Bobby Jones' Grand Slam at Merion Golf Club in suburban Philadelphia in 1930.

== Career ==
Soon afterwards, Dey was approached by the United States Golf Association and offered a job helping to run its New York office. He served as executive director of the USGA from 1934 to 1968, during a period of extraordinary growth in the sport. Dey played a key role in meetings between the USGA and The Royal and Ancient Golf Club of St Andrews in the early 1950s, to standardize the rules of golf around the world.

Following his retirement from the USGA, Dey was asked to serve as the first commissioner of the PGA Tour in January 1969, shortly after the tour players broke away from the PGA of America. During Dey's leadership the tour was known as the Tournament Players Division of the PGA. He held that position for five years, succeeded by tour player Deane Beman in 1974. Dey was the originator of The Players Championship, first held in 1974.

== Death ==
After a battle with cancer, Dey died at age 83 at his home on Long Island at Locust Valley, New York. His wife of 53 years, the former Rosalie Knapp, had died the previous year.

== Awards and honors ==
- In 1975, after retirement, Dey held the honorary position of Captain of The Royal and Ancient Golf Club of St Andrews.
- In 1975, Dey was elected to the World Golf Hall of Fame in 1975, its second year of existence.
- Since 1996, the USGA has given out the Joe Dey Award in recognition of meritorious service to the game of golf as a volunteer.

Preceded by None	Commissioner of the PGA Tour; 1969-1974	Succeeded by Deane Beman
