= Joe Dey Award =

Golf service award

The Joe Dey Award is given by the United States Golf Association in recognition of meritorious service to the game of golf as a volunteer. It is named in honor of Joseph Dey, Jr., who was the USGA's executive director for 35 years and also served as the first PGA Tour commissioner.

== Winners ==
- 2025 David Jacobsen
- 2024 E. Lee Coble
- 2023 Robin Farran
- 2022 Ede Rice
- 2020 Lon Haskew
- 2019 Tom Dudley
- 2018 Gib Palmer
- 2017 Jayne Watson
- 2016 Keith Hansen
- 2015 Dr. David Cookson
- 2014 Michael Cumberpatch
- 2013 Taizo Kawata
- 2012 Stan Grossman
- 2011 Inez Muhleman
- 2010 Joe Luigs
- 2009 Dick Rundle
- 2008 Gene McClure
- 2007 Harry McCracken
- 2006 Bob Hooper
- 2005 Pearl Carey
- 2004 Adele Lebow
- 2003 John Hanna
- 2002 Clyde Luther
- 2001 Bill Dickey
- 2000 Jack Emich
- 1999 Frank Anglim
- 1998 Joe King
- 1997 John Staver
- 1996 Charles Eckstein

== See also ==
- Bob Jones Award
