= Azalea Invitational =

Amateur golf tournament

The Azalea Invitational is an annual amateur golf tournament. It has been played since 1946 at the Country Club of Charleston in Charleston, South Carolina. Several past champions have subsequently gained membership to the PGA Tour, including major champion Webb Simpson.

== Winners ==
- 2026 No tournament – course restoration
- 2025 Christian Cavaliere
- 2024 Stewart Hagestad
- 2023 PJ Maybank III
- 2022 Luke Clanton
- 2021 Abel Gallegos
- 2020 Mateo Fernández de Oliveira
- 2019 No tournament – hosted U.S. Women's Open
- 2018 Cole Hammer
- 2017 Chris Petefish
- 2016 Andy Zhang
- 2015 Todd White
- 2014 Will Murphy
- 2013 Austin Langdale
- 2012 Matthew NeSmith
- 2011 Pan Cheng-tsung
- 2010 Tyson Alexander
- 2009 Tyson Alexander
- 2008 Zack Sucher
- 2007 Webb Simpson
- 2006 No tournament – course restoration
- 2005 Nathan J. Smith
- 2004 Webb Simpson
- 2003 Spencer Levin
- 2002 D. J. Trahan
- 2001 Casey Wittenberg
- 2000 David Eger
- 1999 David Eger
- 1998 Jeff Knox
- 1997 John Engler
- 1996 Ryuji Imada
- 1995 Kelly Miller
- 1994 Mike Bright
- 1993 Frank Ford III
- 1992 Frank Ford III
- 1990–91 No tournament – Hurricane Hugo damage
- 1989 Frank Ford III
- 1988 Frank Ford III
- 1987 Hugh Royer III
- 1986 Frank Ford III
- 1985 John Inman
- 1984 Randy Sonnier
- 1983 John Finnin
- 1982 Frank Ford III
- 1981 David Lane
- 1980 Jim Burgess
- 1979 Bill Britton
- 1978 Ken Green
- 1977 Vance Heafner
- 1976 Buddy Alexander
- 1975 Skip Dunaway
- 1974 George Burns
- 1973 Bob Bryant
- 1972 Wally Kuchar
- 1971 Jim Belton
- 1970 Leroy Rabon
- 1969 Dick Siderowf
- 1968 Dick Horne
- 1967 R. H. Watson
- 1966 Curtis Wagner
- 1965 Curtis Wagner
- 1964 Charlie Smith
- 1963 Bill Christian
- 1962 Dave Smith
- 1961 Billy Joe Patton
- 1960 Dale Morey
- 1959 Dave Smith
- 1958 Charlie Smith
- 1957 Billy Thornton
- 1956 Mickey Gallagher
- 1955 Bobby Hackett
- 1954 Hobart Manley
- 1953 Hobart Manley
- 1952 Frank Ford, Sr.
- 1951 Moultrie McKevlin
- 1950 Frank Ford, Sr.
- 1949 Ben Goodes
- 1948 Ben Goodes
- 1947 Frank Ford, Sr.
- 1946 Frank Ford, Sr.
