= Jeff Knox =

American amateur golfer

- Born: Jefferson B.A. Knox; Thomson, Georgia
- Education: University of Georgia
- Occupation: golfer
- Known for: non-competitive marker for the Masters golf tournament
- Notable work: holds course record 61 at Augusta National Golf Club

Jefferson B.A. Knox is an American amateur golfer. Knox is a member of Augusta National Golf Club, where he holds the course record with an 11-under 61 off the member's tees. He is known for serving as the non-competitive marker for the Masters golf tournament from 2002 to 2021. Knox is considered to be the best amateur golfer in the state of Georgia.

== Personal life ==
Knox was born in Thomson, Georgia. He attended Thomson High School, and the University of Georgia, where he earned a degree in finance in 1984. Knox is a prior board member of the University of Georgia Foundation and the First Bank of Georgia.

== Golf career ==
Knox won the 1998 edition of the Azalea Invitational amateur tournament with a score of 270. He has also won the Peach Blossom Invitational and is a two-time Charlie Coe champion. He is a member of the Georgia Golf Hall of Fame.

From 2002 to 2021 Knox served as the non-competitive marker for the Masters golf tournament. A non-competitive marker is a player from outside the field who is brought in when an odd number of players make the cut to fill out the first pairing. During his time at the Masters, Knox became known as a course specialist by beating many of the professional players he was paired with.

== Notable rounds at the Masters ==
In 2014, Knox was paired with then world number nine Rory McIlroy in the third round. Despite McIlroy finishing birdie-par-birdie-birdie and Knox bogeying the 18th hole, Knox defeated McIlroy 70 to 71. He followed that up in the fourth round by beating 1987 Masters champion Larry Mize 77 to 79. McIlroy later said that Knox was "...the best [he'd] ever seen on Augusta's greens."

In 2006, Knox was paired with Sergio García. To make the round more interesting, the two golfers are reputed to have placed a bet on the outcome of the round. After his tee shot went into the trees on the 18th hole, García finished one over 73. Knox finished 72. García refused to shake Knox's hand after the round. After the 2006 tournament, Jim Furyk said that Knox could "beat half the field who made the cut."

In 2008, Knox was paired with Miguel Ángel Jiménez. On the first hole, Jiménez drove a long tee shot straight down the fairway. Knox promptly outdrove him. Following this, Jiménez is reputed to have turned to Knox and told him not to outdrive him again. Knox did so again on the 10th hole.

In 2018, he made the only Saturday birdie on the 11th hole.

Knox has played rounds at the Masters with Keegan Bradley, Bubba Watson, Craig Stadler, Kelly Kraft, Jason Day, Ernie Els, Eddie Pepperell and Kang Sung-hoon among others.

Several notable golfers, including Phil Mickelson and Tiger Woods, have sought out Knox for his expertise before playing at Augusta.
