= Eastern Amateur =

The Eastern Amateur was an annual amateur golf tournament from 1957 to 2025. It was played at Elizabeth Manor Golf and Country Club in Portsmouth, Virginia; the only exceptions were in 1977 when it was played at Sleepy Hole Golf Course in Suffolk, Virginia and in 1999 when it was played at nearby Bide-A-Wee Golf Course in Portsmouth during renovations at Elizabeth Manor. It was last played in 2025.

== Winners ==
Year	Player	Score
2025	Jake Albert	261
2024	Trey Marrion	270
2023	Kyle Haas	272
2022	Evan Beck	267
2021	Evan Beck	270
2020	Canceled	
2019	Hunter Ostrom	267
2018	Nick Lyerly	264
2017	Barry Babbitt	264
2016	Joey Lane	266
2015	James Clark	198
2014	Chris Hickman	258
2013	Mike Moyers	266
2012	Roger Newsom	264
2011	Steve Liebler	268
2010	Dominic Bozzelli	265
2009	Arnond Vongvanij	266
2008	Jude Eustaquio	260
2007	Bill Rankin	265
2006	Mark Ogren	266
2005	Kyle Moore	267
2004	Ryan Blaum	268
2003	Braxton Wynns	273
2002	Braxton Wynns	199
2001	Andrew Medley	273
2000	Sean Dougherty	271
1999	Wayne Perske	279
1998	Arron Oberholser	274
1997	Tom McKnight	270
1996	Jason Buha	205
1995	Tom McKnight	274
1994	Steve Liebler	276
1993	Tom McKnight	269
1992	David Howser	274
1991	Jason Widener	273
1990	Jon Hurst	268
1989	Ryoken Kawagishi	274
1988	O. D. Vincent	273
1987	Jay Nichols	274
1986	Ralph Howe III	279
1985	Phil McCormick	271
1984	Fred Wadsworth	277
1983	J. P. Leigh III	280
1982	John Inman	279
1981	Steve Liebler	282
1980	Mike West	280
1979	Greg Chapman	281
1978	Vance Heafner	281
1977	Buddy Alexander	282
1976	Vance Heafner	284
1975	Curtis Strange	268
1974	Andy Bean	272
1973	Vinny Giles	285
1972	Ben Crenshaw	281
1971	Ben Crenshaw	280
1970	Steve Melnyk	277
1969	Lanny Wadkins	278
1968	Bob Barbarossa	286
1967	Hal Underwood	277
1966	Marty Fleckman	277
1965	George Boutell	279
1964	Deane Beman	282
1963	Deane Beman	282
1962	Charlie Smith	275
1961	Deane Beman	281
1960	Deane Beman	283
1959	Ward Wettlaufer	284
1958	Ward Wettlaufer	286
1957	Tom Strange	284
