= Gerald Church =

Scottish footballer (1928–2021)

Personal information
- Full name: Gerald Church
- Date of birth: 28 January 1928
- Place of birth: Calton, Scotland
- Date of death: 17 July 2021 (aged 93)
- Place of death: Winchester-on-the-Severn, Maryland, U.S.
- Position: Left back

Youth career
- Glasgow University

Senior career*
Years	Team	Apps	(Gls)
1955–1957	Queen's Park	5	(0)

International career
1956	Scotland Amateurs	1	(0)
- * Club domestic league appearances and goals

Gerald Church (28 January 1928 – 17 July 2021) was a Scottish amateur footballer who played as a left back in the Scottish League for Queen's Park. He was capped by Scotland at amateur level.

== Life and career ==
Church attended St Aloysius' College and University of Glasgow Medical School. Following two years in the Royal Army Medical Corps, he specialised in Internal Medicine and Cardiology.

Church emigrated to the United States in the late 1950s and from 1960 worked at local Annapolis hospitals, including Anne Arundel Medical Center and North Arundel Hospital. He was later made a Fellow of the American College of Physicians and received an award of appreciation from the University of Maryland Baltimore Washington Medical Center for his service between 1966 and 2011.

Church was married with four children. He died at home in Winchester-on-the-Severn, on 17 July 2021, at the age of 93.
