= Mike Holland (golfer) =

American professional golfer (1956–2021)

Personal information
- Full name: Michael Arthur Holland
- Nationality: United States
- Born: March 12, 1956 Bishopville, South Carolina, U.S.
- Died: November 29, 2021 (aged 65) Georgetown, South Carolina, U.S.
- Height: 5 ft 11 in (1.80 m)
- Weight: 170 lb (77 kg; 12 st)

Career
- Sport: Golf
- College: University of South Carolina
- Turned professional: 1978
- Former tour: PGA Tour
- Professional wins: 3

Number of wins by tour
- PGA Tour: 1
- Korn Ferry Tour: 1

Best results in major championships
- Masters Tournament: DNP
- PGA Championship: T29: 1982
- U.S. Open: CUT: 1983, 1984
- The Open Championship: DNP

Michael Arthur Holland (March 12, 1956 – November 29, 2021) was an American professional golfer. He played on the PGA Tour and the Nationwide Tour.

== Early life and amateur career ==
Holland was born, raised and lived in Bishopville, South Carolina. He attended the University of South Carolina and was a member of the golf team, an All-American his senior year.

== Professional career ==
In 1978, Holland turned professional. He had a handful of top-10 finishes in PGA Tour events. He won a share of the 1981 Walt Disney World National Team Championship with playing partner Vance Heafner. A year later he finished a solo 2nd in the Danny Thomas Memphis Classic losing by six strokes to Raymond Floyd. His best finish in a major was T29 at the 1982 PGA Championship.

== Professional wins (3) ==
=== PGA Tour wins (1) ===
No.	Date	Tournament	Winning score	Margin of victory	Runners-up
1	Oct 25, 1981	Walt Disney World National Team Championship (with (United States) Vance Heafner)	−42 (60-62-61-63=246)	5 strokes	(United States) Chip Beck and (United States) Rex Caldwell

=== Ben Hogan Tour wins (1) ===
No.	Date	Tournament	Winning score	Margin of victory	Runner-up
1	Jul 7, 1991	Ben Hogan Connecticut Open	−11 (67-65-67=199)	4 strokes	(United States) P. H. Horgan III

=== Other wins (1) ===
- 1976 South Carolina Open (as an amateur)

== See also ==
- Spring 1980 PGA Tour Qualifying School graduates
