= Charlie Smith (golfer) =

American golfer

Personal information
- Full name: Charles Blalock Smith
- Nationality: United States
- Born: February 6, 1931 Gastonia, North Carolina, U.S.
- Died: March 16, 2011 (aged 80) Gastonia, North Carolina, U.S.

Career
- Sport: Golf
- College: The Citadel, The Military College of South Carolina
- Status: Amateur

Best results in major championships
- Masters Tournament: CUT: 1962, 1963, 1964, 1965
- PGA Championship: DNP
- U.S. Open: CUT: 1961, 1962
- The Open Championship: DNP

Charles Blalock Smith (February 6, 1931 – March 16, 2011) was an American amateur golfer. He played in the 1961 and 1963 Walker Cup matches.

== Golf career ==
Smith played college golf at The Citadel, The Military College of South Carolina, graduating in 1952. He was inducted into The Citadel Hall of Fame in 1985.

Smith had considerable success as an amateur in the early 1960s. He represented the United States in the Walker Cup in 1961 and 1963 and also in the Americas Cup in 1961. He won a number of important amateur tournaments, including the Azalea Invitational, Carolinas Open, North and South Men's Amateur Golf Championship, Eastern Amateur, Southern Amateur, and Carolinas Amateur. He played in the Masters four times and twice in the U.S. Open, although he missed the cut on all six occasions. He reached the quarter-finals of the U.S. Amateur in 1961 and 1964.

== Personal life ==
Smith served in the US Air Force. His brother Dave was also a successful amateur golfer, winning the Azalea Invitational and the Carolinas Amateur.

== Amateur wins ==
- 1948 Donald Ross Junior Championship
- 1952 South Carolina Intercollegiate
- 1958 Azalea Invitational
- 1960 Carolinas Open, North and South Men's Amateur Golf Championship, Southern Amateur
- 1962 Eastern Amateur, Carolinas Amateur
- 1964 Azalea Invitational

== Results in major championships ==
Tournament	1961	1962	1963	1964	1965
Masters Tournament		CUT	CUT	CUT	CUT
U.S. Open	CUT	CUT			

Note: Smith never played in The Open Championship or the PGA Championship.

Did not play

CUT = missed the half-way cut

== U.S. national team appearances ==
Amateur

- Walker Cup: 1961 (winners), 1963 (winners)
- Americas Cup: 1961 (winners)
