= Ward Wettlaufer =

American golfer

H. Ward Wettlaufer (October 31, 1935 – March 31, 2016) was an American amateur golfer.

== Career ==
A native of Buffalo, New York, Wettlaufer served for 50 years since graduation from Hamilton College as an executive and CEO of a family business manufacturing and distributing commercial printing supplies.

In his free time, he played high-level amateur golf. He has numerous titles to his name, including the Eastern Amateur, two Porter Cup championships, North and South Amateur, and the Walker Cup as a member of the "unbeatable" 1959 U.S. team.

Ward Wettlaufer, 1959.

== Awards and honors ==
- In 1995, Wettlaufer was inducted into the Greater Buffalo Sports Hall of Fame
- In 1996, Wettlaufer earned the U.S. Senior Amateur Man of the Year

== Tournament wins ==
- 1953 International Junior Masters
- 1956 Tam O'Shanter World Amateur, Bermuda Amateur
- 1958 Eastern Amateur
- 1959 Eastern Amateur
- 1960 Porter Cup
- 1965 Porter Cup
- 1966 North and South Amateur, Georgia State Amateur, Atlanta Open
- 1990 Wild Dunes Senior Champion
- 1991 Wild Dunes Senior Champion
- 1995 Society of Seniors Medal Play

== U.S. national team appearances ==
Amateur

- Walker Cup: 1959 (winners)
