= Vance Heafner =

American professional golfer (1954–2012)

Personal information
- Full name: Clayton Vance Heafner Jr.
- Nationality: United States
- Born: August 11, 1954 Charlotte, North Carolina, U.S.
- Died: September 26, 2012 (aged 58) Raleigh, North Carolina, U.S.
- Height: 6 ft 0 in (1.83 m)
- Weight: 170 lb (77 kg; 12 st)

Career
- Sport: Golf
- College: North Carolina State University
- Turned professional: 1978
- Former tours: PGA Tour; T. C. Jordan Tour; Champions Tour
- Professional wins: 3

Number of wins by tour
- PGA Tour: 1
- Other: 2

Best results in major championships
- Masters Tournament: T45: 1978
- PGA Championship: T11: 1981
- U.S. Open: T52: 1993
- The Open Championship: DNP

Clayton Vance Heafner Jr. (August 11, 1954 – September 26, 2012) was an American professional golfer who played on the PGA Tour, the Nationwide Tour and the Champions Tour.

== Early life ==
In 1954, Heafner was born in Charlotte, North Carolina. He was the son of professional golfer Clayton Heafner and Mary Ellen Allen. The family moved to Cary, North Carolina where he attended Cary Elementary School and Cary High School.

== Amateur career ==
Heafner attended North Carolina State University and was a three-time All-American member of the golf team. Heafner played on the 1977 Walker Cup team winning all three of his matches to help lead the U.S. to victory.

== Professional career ==
In 1978, Heafner turned professional. He played in 266 events on the PGA Tour from 1978–1988, making the cut 157 times. He had 20 top-10 finishes including a win at the 1981 Walt Disney World National Team Championship with playing partner Mike Holland.

Heafner played some on the PGA Tour's developmental tour toward the end of his regular career years. His best finish in that venue is a T-14 at the 1994 NIKE Carolina Classic. After reaching the age of 50 in August 2004, he began to play on the Champions Tour in selected events. His best finish was a T-34 at the 2006 SAS Championship.

Heafner was Director of Golf at the Prestonwood Country Club in Cary, North Carolina. Most recently a teaching pro at Wildwood Golf Club in Raleigh, North Carolina.

== Personal life ==
During his final years, Heafner resided in Raleigh, North Carolina. He died in 2012.

== Amateur wins ==
- 1976 Eastern Amateur
- 1977 Azalea Invitational, Porter Cup, North Carolina Amateur
- 1978 Eastern Amateur

== Professional wins (3) ==
=== PGA Tour wins (1) ===
No.	Date	Tournament	Winning score	Margin of victory	Runners-up
1	Oct 25, 1981	Walt Disney World National Team Championship (with (United States) Mike Holland)	−42 (60-62-61-63=246)	5 strokes	(United States) Chip Beck and (United States) Rex Caldwell

=== T. C. Jordan Tour wins (1) ===
No.	Date	Tournament	Winning score	Margin of victory	Runners-up
1	Aug 11, 1991	Hampton Inn Classic	−13 (69-70-66-68=273)	2 strokes	(United States) Marion Dantzler, (United States) Eric Manning

=== Other wins (1) ===
this list may be incomplete

- 1974 Carolinas Open (as an amateur)

== Results in major championships ==
Tournament	1978	1979	1980	1981	1982	1983	1984	1985	1986	1987	1988	1989	1990	1991	1992	1993
Masters Tournament	T45															
U.S. Open	CUT	CUT	CUT		T53	CUT										T52
PGA Championship				T11	T54	T47		CUT								

Note: Heafner never played in The Open Championship.

Did not play

CUT = missed the half-way cut
"T" indicates a tie for a place

== U.S. national team appearances ==
- Walker Cup: 1977 (winners)

== See also ==
- Spring 1980 PGA Tour Qualifying School graduates
- 1986 PGA Tour Qualifying School graduates
