= List of Georgia Southern University alumni =

This list of Georgia Southern University alumni includes graduates, non-graduate former students and current students of First District Agricultural and Mechanical School, Georgia Normal School, South Georgia Teacher's College, Georgia Southern College, and/or Georgia Southern University.

Georgia Southern University is a four-year, state-supported, university located in Statesboro, Georgia.

== Entertainment ==
=== Film, television and radio ===
Name	Class year	Notability	References
Patrika Darbo		actress	
Druski		comedian, actor, and influencer	
Walton Goggins		actor	
James Kicklighter	2010	film director	
Mychael Knight		Project Runway Season 3 cast member	

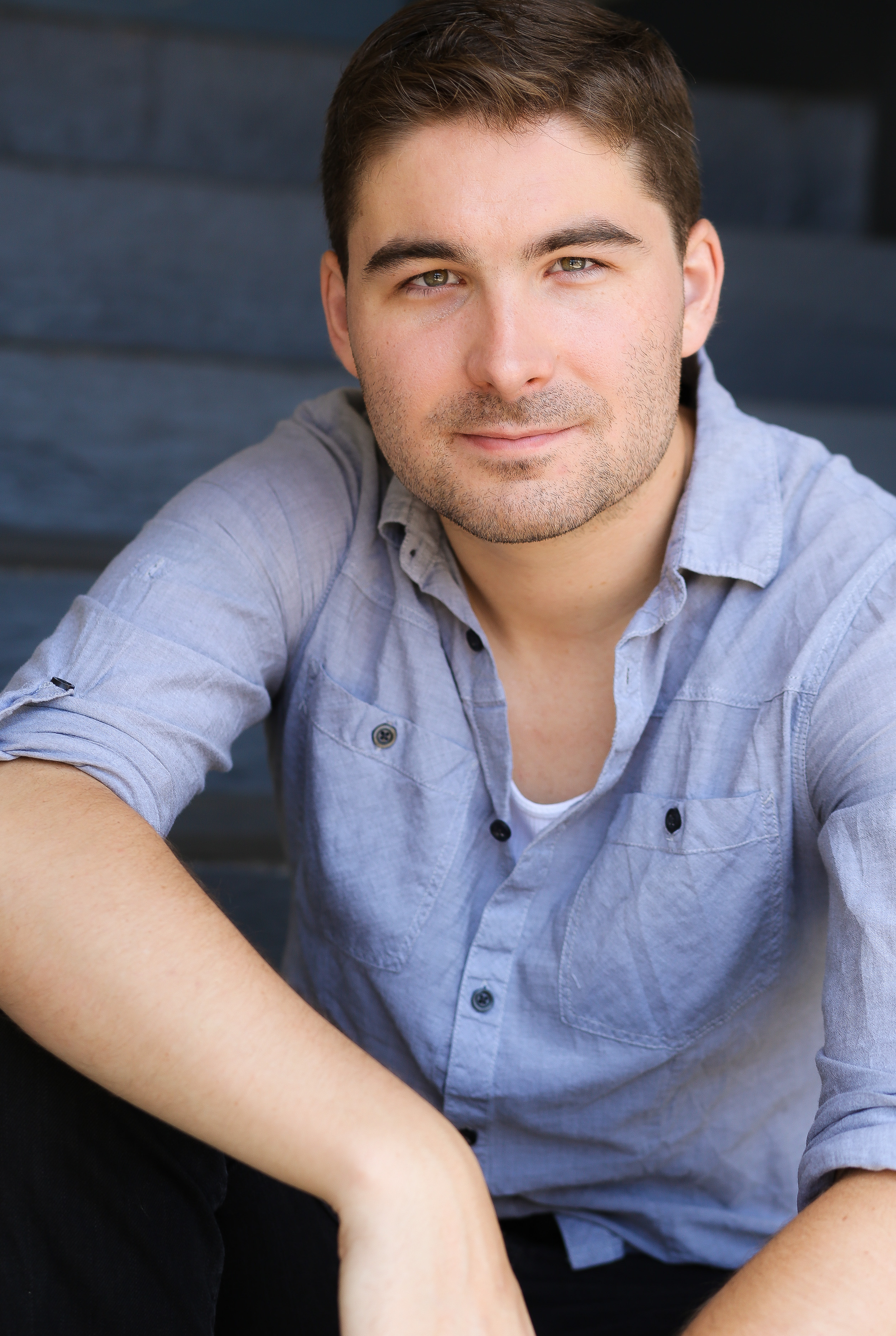
Director James Kicklighter

=== Music ===
Name	Class year	Notability	References
Luke Bryan	1999	singer	

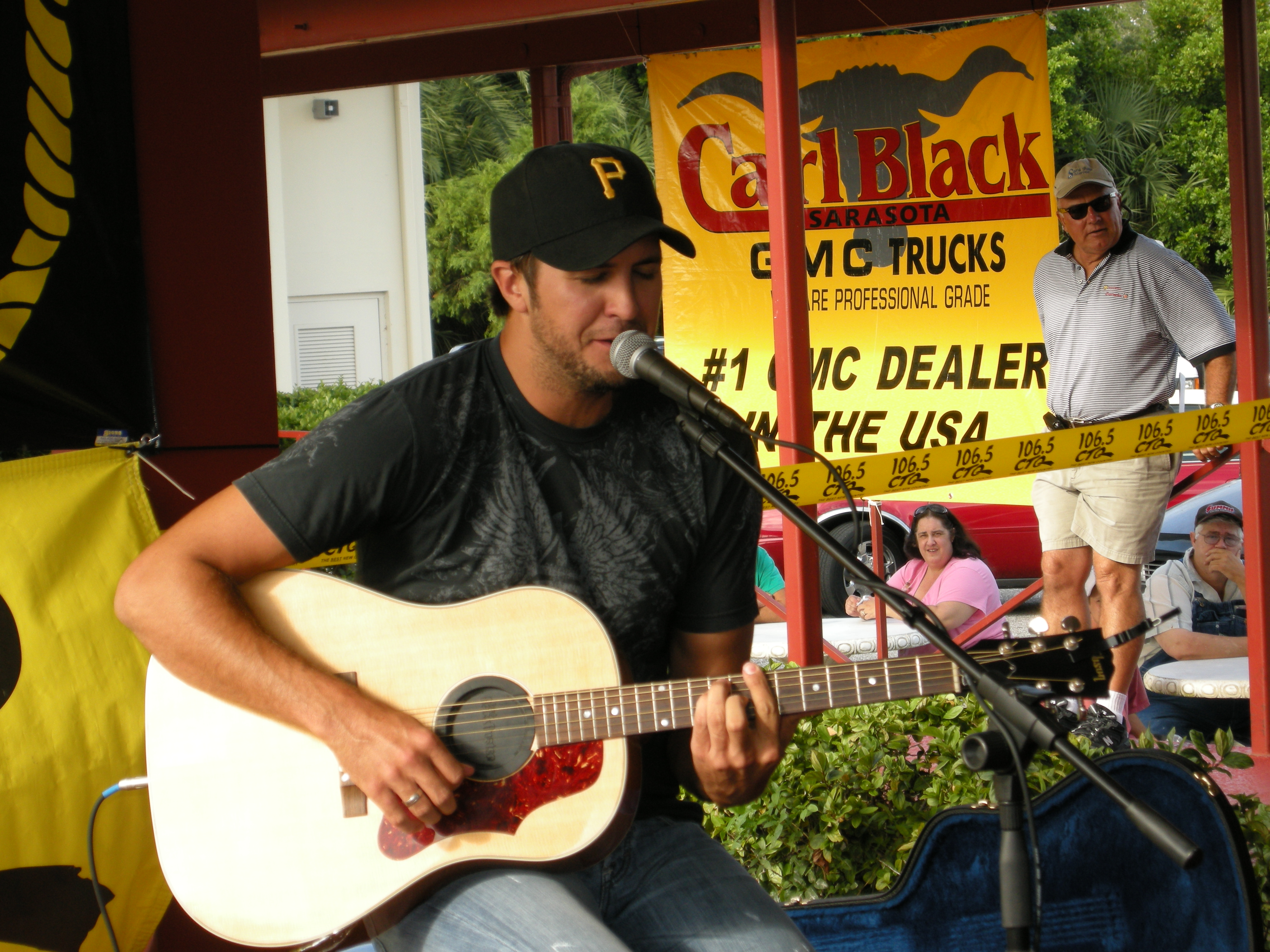
Singer Luke Bryan

=== Sports ===
Name	Class year	Notability	References
Tyler Bass		kicker for the Buffalo Bills	
Jon Cox		professional soccer player with the Atlanta Silverbacks	
Michael Curry		former head coach of the Detroit Pistons of the NBA; former NBA player; former president of NBA Players Association	
Ukeme Eligwe		Kansas City Chiefs	
Jayson Foster	2007	Baltimore Ravens wide receiver, Walter Payton Award winner	
Todd Greene		former MLB catcher	
Tracy Ham		College Football Hall of Famer, 1995 CFL Most Outstanding Player	
Joey Hamilton		former MLB pitcher 1994–2003	
Younghoe Koo	2016	kicker for the Atlanta Falcons	
Jerick McKinnon		Kansas City Chiefs running back, third round draft pick 2014 by the Minnesota Vikings	
Earthwind Moreland		former NFL cornerback	
Jodie Mudd		PGA Tour golfer	
Adrian Peterson		Chicago Bears running back, Walter Payton Award winner	
Aron Price		PGA Tour golfer	
Jeff Sanders		former NBA first round draft pick	
Gene Sauers		PGA Tour golfer; 2011 inductee to the Georgia Golf Hall of Fame	
Fred Stokes		former NFL defensive end, Super Bowl XXVI champion	
Everett Teaford		pitcher for the Kansas City Royals	
Kiwaukee Thomas		former NFL defensive back	
John Tudor		former MLB pitcher	
J. J. Wilcox		Dallas Cowboys safety, second round draft pick 2013	

Jayson Foster at Georgia Southern Fan Day

- Zack Bryant (born 1997), basketball player in the Israeli Basketball Premier League

== Business ==
Name	Class year	Notability	References
Daniel Cathy	1975	president, Chick-Fil-A	
Hala Moddelmog		chief executive officer, Arby's	

== Government and public service ==
Name	Class year	Notability	References
Michael P. Boggs	1985	associate justice of the Georgia Supreme Court	
Casey Cagle	attended, but did not graduate	lt. governor, Georgia	
Jack Hill		member of Georgia State Senate (1991–2020)	
Bill Hitchens		member of Georgia House of Representatives (2012–present)	
Van R. Johnson		mayor of Savannah, Georgia	
Charlie Norwood		U.S. congressman (1995–2007)	
Leslie C. Smith	1985	66th Inspector General of the US Army	
Jane Grier Durden		President General of the United Daughters of the Confederacy	

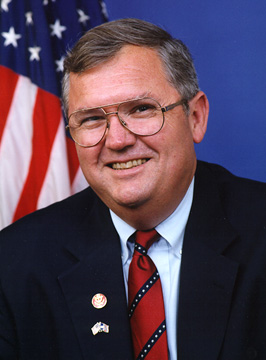
Former US Congressman Charlie Norwood

== Scientists and researchers ==
Name	Class year	Notability	References
Lee R. Berger		explorer	

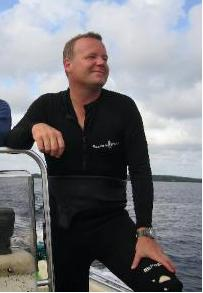
Lee R. Berger
