= 1961 Walker Cup =

Golf tournament

18th Walker Cup Match
- Dates: September 1–2, 1961
- Venue: Seattle Golf Club
- Location: Seattle, Washington
- Captains: Jack Westland (USA); Charles Lawrie (GB&I)
(United States)	11	1	(United Kingdom) (Republic of Ireland)
- United States wins the Walker Cup

The 1961 Walker Cup, the 18th Walker Cup Match, was played on September 1 and 2, 1961, at Seattle Golf Club, Seattle, Washington. The United States won by 11 matches to 1. This was the last Walker Cup in which 36-hole matches were played.

Great Britain and Ireland's only success came when Martin Christmas beat Charlie Smith in the singles.

== Format ==
Four 36-hole matches of foursomes were played on Friday and eight singles matches on Saturday. Each of the 12 matches was worth one point in the larger team competition. If a match was all square after the 36th hole extra holes were not played. The team with most points won the competition. If the two teams were tied, the previous winner would retain the trophy.

== Teams ==
Ten players for the United States and Great Britain & Ireland participated in the event plus one non-playing captain for each team.

=== United States ===
Captain: Jack Westland

- Gene Andrews
- Deane Beman
- Don Cherry
- Bob Cochran
- Charles Coe
- Robert W. Gardner
- Bill Hyndman
- Jack Nicklaus
- Charlie Smith
- Bud Taylor

=== Great Britain and Ireland ===
&
Captain: (Scotland) Charles Lawrie

- (Scotland) David Blair
- (England) Michael Bonallack
- (Republic of Ireland) Joe Carr
- (England) Brian Chapman
- (England) Martin Christmas
- (England) David Frame
- (England) Gordon Huddy
- (England) Michael Lunt
- (Scotland) Ronnie Shade
- (Scotland) James Walker

== Friday's foursomes ==
&	Results
Walker/Chapman	(United States) 6 & 5	Beman/Nicklaus
Blair/Christmas	(United States) 1 up	Coe/Cherry
Carr/Huddy	(United States) 4 & 3	Hyndman/Gardner
Bonallack/Shade	(United States) 4 & 3	Cochran/Andrews
0	Foursomes	4
0	Overall	4

== Saturday's singles ==
&	Results
Michael Bonallack	(United States) 3 & 2	Deane Beman
Michael Lunt	(United States) 5 & 4	Charles Coe
James Walker	(United States) 3 & 2	Bud Taylor
David Frame	(United States) 7 & 6	Bill Hyndman
Joe Carr	(United States) 6 & 4	Jack Nicklaus
Martin Christmas	(United Kingdom) (Republic of Ireland) 3 & 2	Charlie Smith
Ronnie Shade	(United States) 1 up	Robert W. Gardner
David Blair	(United States) 5 & 4	Don Cherry
1	Singles	7
1	Overall	11
