= Church's Texas Chicken =

American fast food restaurant chain

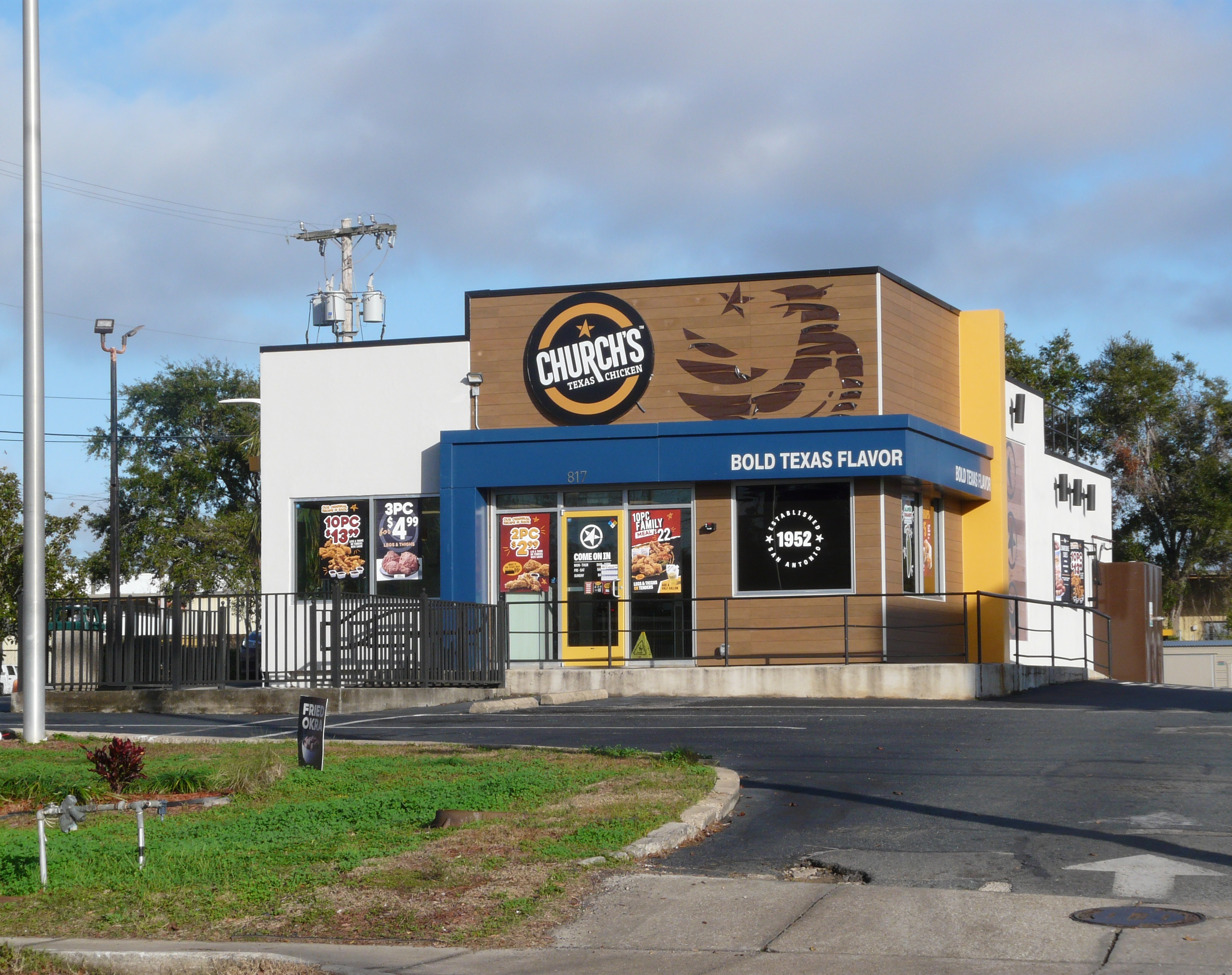
- A Church's location in Tallahassee, Florida
- Trade name: Church's Chicken or Texas Chicken or Church's Texas Chicken
- Type: Private
- Industry: Quick-service restaurants
- Founded: April 17, 1952; 74 years ago in San Antonio, Texas
- Founder: George W. Church Sr.
- Headquarters: Atlanta, Georgia, U.S.
- Number of locations: 1,500+ (2025)
- Areas served: United States, Puerto Rico, Canada, Mexico, Bahrain, Cambodia, Egypt, Germany, Guyana, Honduras, Indonesia, Iraq, Jamaica, Laos, New Zealand, Oman, Qatar, St. Croix, St. Kitts & Nevis, St. Lucia, Saudi Arabia, Singapore, Syria, Trinidad and Tobago, United Arab Emirates, Vietnam, Malaysia
- Key people: Roland Gonzalez (CEO & President); Tim Waddell (EVP, International Business); Danton Nolan (CFO); Alisa Cleek (CPO & CLO); Bobby Morena (CDO, Domestic Business)
- Products: Fast food, most known for its fried chicken, honey-butter biscuits and jalapenos.
- Revenue: ▲US$ 1.6 billion (2025) ▲US$ 1.3 billion (2022)
- Owner: High Bluff Capital Partners (United States); South American Restaurants Corporation (Puerto Rico and Honduras)
- Website: www.churchs.com

Church's Texas Chicken is an American fast food restaurant chain that specializes in Southern fried chicken and is headquartered in Atlanta, Georgia. The chain was founded as Church's Fried Chicken To-Go by George W. Church Sr. in April 1952, in San Antonio, Texas, across the street from The Alamo. Church's Texas Chicken trades as Texas Chicken or Church's Chicken in many countries.

The chain is owned by an American private equity firm known as High Bluff Capital Partners.

As of 2017, Church's Texas Chicken had more than 1,700 franchised and company-owned locations in 26 countries.

== History ==
Logo, Texas Chicken

Logo, Church's Texas Chicken

In 1952, retired chicken incubator salesman George W. Church Sr. opened the first Church's Chicken, named Church's Fried Chicken To-Go, in San Antonio, Texas.

Initially, Church's Chicken was a single walk-up establishment that sold only fried chicken. Two pieces of chicken and a roll cost 49 cents. Church's Chicken added fries and jalapeños to its menu in 1955. To allow customers to see their food prepared while they waited, Church Sr. designed the kitchen with the fryers next to the takeout window.

=== Early expansion, franchising and sale ===
The company had four restaurants by the time of Church Sr.'s death in 1956. After his death, family members took over operations. In 1962, with Church Sr.'s son Bill Church Jr. as top executive, there were eight restaurants in San Antonio. To begin expanding and franchising in 1965, Church Jr. and his brother Richard developed a signature marinade that could be prepared at any location. Former vacuum cleaner salesman J. David Bamberger, who first met Church Jr. when he joined Bamberger's vacuum cleaner distributorship, joined Church's Chicken in 1965 to oversee the franchising. In 1967, the chain opened restaurants in five Texan cities outside of San Antonio and operated 17 restaurants in 1968.

In 1966, a contract between Church's Fried Chicken, Inc. and Jim Dandy Fast Foods, Inc. gave Jim Dandy the right to use the trade names and trademarks "Church's Fried Chicken" or "Church's" within fifty miles of Houston's city hall and within the city limits of Galveston, Texas for ten years, as long as Church's Chicken received the agreed upon royalties.

In 1968, the Church family sold the company, which became incorporated and went public in 1969. By the end of 1968, there were more than 100 Church's Chicken restaurants in seven states, making the chain the first from Texas to become a national one. Between 1969 and 1974, Church's Chicken gained 387 more restaurants.

In the late 1970s, the chain briefly operated a hamburger franchise in Texas called G.W. Jrs. The roughly 60 locations were shuttered in 1985.

In 1980, Church Jr. resigned as corporation chairman, and was replaced by childhood friend, Roger Harvin.

In March 1996, Hala Moddelmog was appointed president of Church's Chicken, making her the first female president of a fast food restaurant chain.

=== Global and national expansion ===
Church's Chicken began its international expansion in the 1970s, in Canada, Mexico, Japan, and Puerto Rico. In the 1980s, it gained popularity in Indonesia when it opened under the trade name, "Texas Chicken". The first reason of changing the name to "Texas" is because the brand name "Church" was not popular in countries with majority non-Christian religions, such as Indonesia. Afterwards, locations in Malaysia, Taiwan, Singapore, and the Philippines were also opened under the trade name "Texas Chicken".

In February 2008, Church's Chicken entered the UK market under the "Texas Chicken" name, claiming to have signed up 50 former Dixy Chicken franchisees. Only a small number of restaurants opened, with one in High Road Leytonstone, London, and another in Salford, Greater Manchester. They withdrew from the UK a few years later.

In 2017, Church's Chicken announced a multi-year development deal with Goalz Restaurant Group, LLC to develop 20 Church's Chicken restaurants each year in Florida, Kentucky, Ohio, Colorado, North Carolina and South Carolina.

World map of countries with at least one Church's Chicken (Texas Chicken) location

In 2022, Church's Texas Chicken operated more than 1,500 locations worldwide. Its international locations include Bahrain, Belarus, Cambodia, Canada, Costa Rica, Curaçao, Guyana, Honduras, Indonesia, Iraq, Jordan, Laos, Malaysia, Mexico, New Zealand, Oman, Pakistan, Puerto Rico, Saudi Arabia, Qatar, Singapore, St. Lucia, Thailand, Trinidad & Tobago, United Arab Emirates, Venezuela and Vietnam.

However, Church's Texas Chicken's operation in Thailand, which is operated under license by PTT OR (PTT Oil and Retail Business Public Company Limited) as Texas Chicken was discontinued on 30 September 2024 as it was announced in their official Facebook page after 9 years of its operation. As of 30 September 2024, PTT OR operates 97 Texas Chicken locations nationwide in Thailand.

=== Acquisitions ===
In 1989, after a four-month legal dispute to avoid a takeover, Church's Chicken became the second-largest chicken restaurant chain when it was acquired by Popeyes for $330 million. The acquisition court documents stated that Church's Chicken would close 250 of its restaurants, "keep 92 with the Church's name, rename 303 others as Popeyes and sell 440 others for about $160 million over the next four years". Merrill Lynch and a group of banks led by Canadian Imperial financed the acquisition.

In 1992, Popeyes' parent company, Al Copeland Enterprises, Inc., was forced to file chapter 11 bankruptcy for the more than $400 million debt it owed its creditors for the Church's Chicken buyout. In 1993, Al Copeland Enterprises, Inc. was renamed AFC Enterprises, Inc., or America's Favorite Chicken, and became the parent company of Church's Chicken and Popeyes.

In 2004, Arcapita bought Church's Chicken from AFC Enterprises, Inc., and former Domino's Pizza and Little Caesars executive Harsha Agadi became president and CEO of Church's Chicken. In 2005, because Arcapita invests in companies that respect Shari'ah principles, it removed pork products from the Church's Chicken menu.

In 2007, AFC Enterprises, Inc. filed a lawsuit against Church's Chicken and former franchise group CVI Company, for allegedly colluding to breach Popeyes' franchise, development and guaranty agreements with CVI, when "Church's [Chicken] bought all 10 of CVI's Popeyes' restaurants and converted most of them to the Church's Chicken brand".

In August 2009, San Francisco private equity firm Friedman Fleischer & Lowe bought Church's Chicken from Arcapita, for an estimated value of $390 million. In June 2019, Friedman Fleischer & Lowe placed the company up for sale, after years of declining sales and store counts.

In August 2021, Church's Chicken was acquired by High Bluff-backed Rego Restaurant Group, the owners of Quiznos and Taco del Mar.

=== Co-franchising ===
By the mid-to late-1990s, Church's Chicken and hamburger chain White Castle announced their co-franchise, in which both companies would sell their own separate products, while operating in some shared restaurant spaces, with some shared personnel. In Canada, Church's Chicken items were once available in Harvey's restaurants, but the co-venture was discontinued.

Church's Texas Chicken restaurants

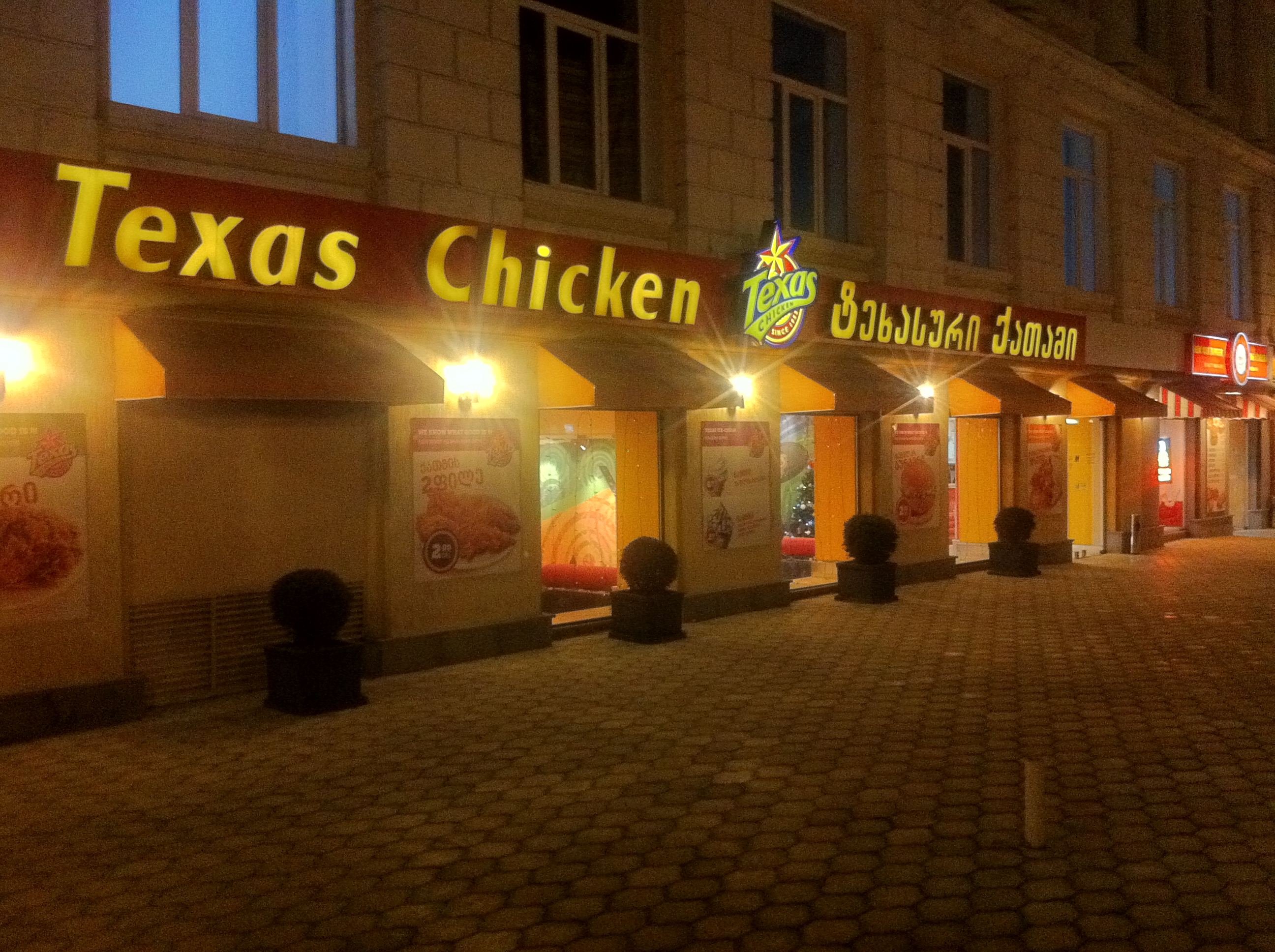
Texas Chicken in Tbilisi, Georgia.

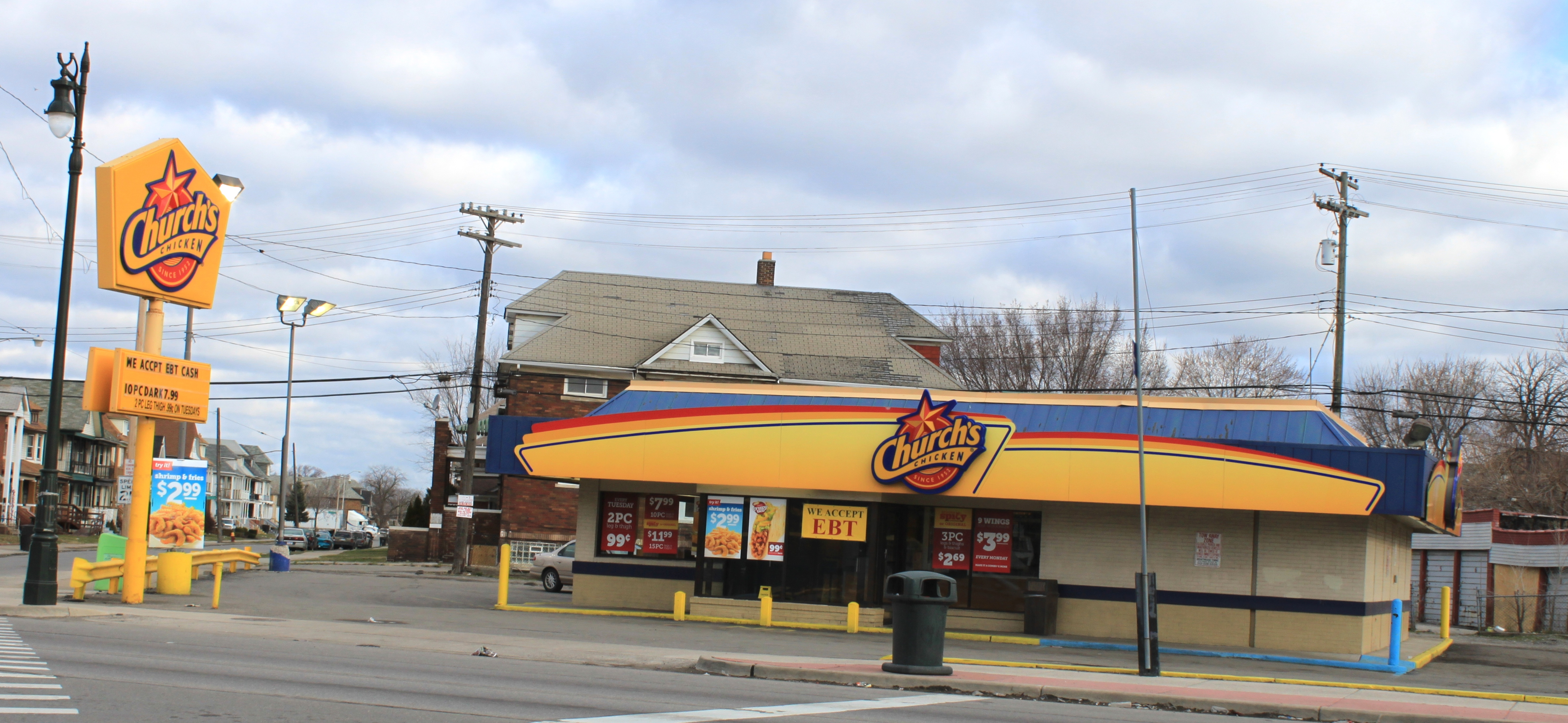
A Church's Texas Chicken in Detroit

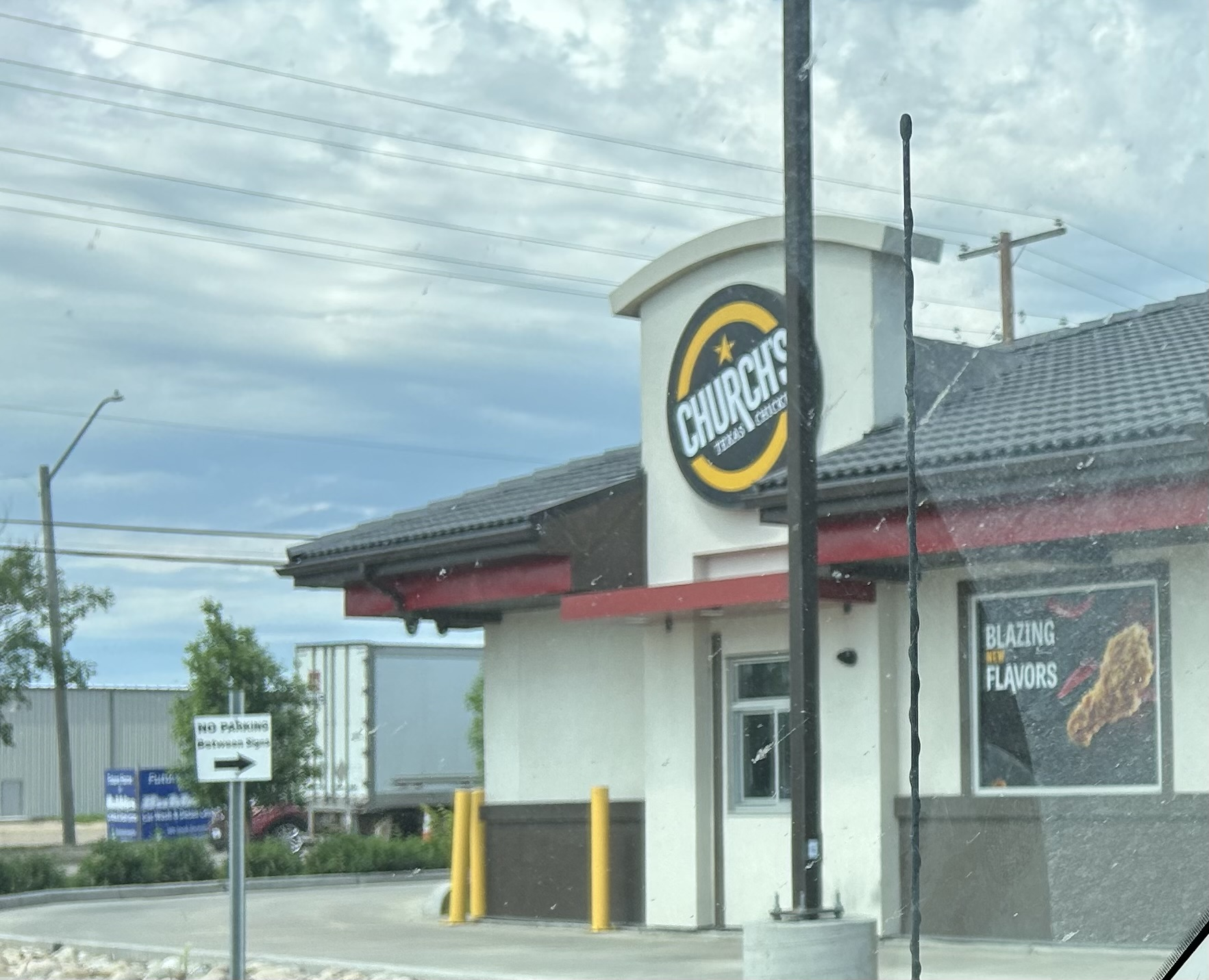
A Church's Texas Chicken in Saskatoon, Saskatchewan, Canada

== Products ==
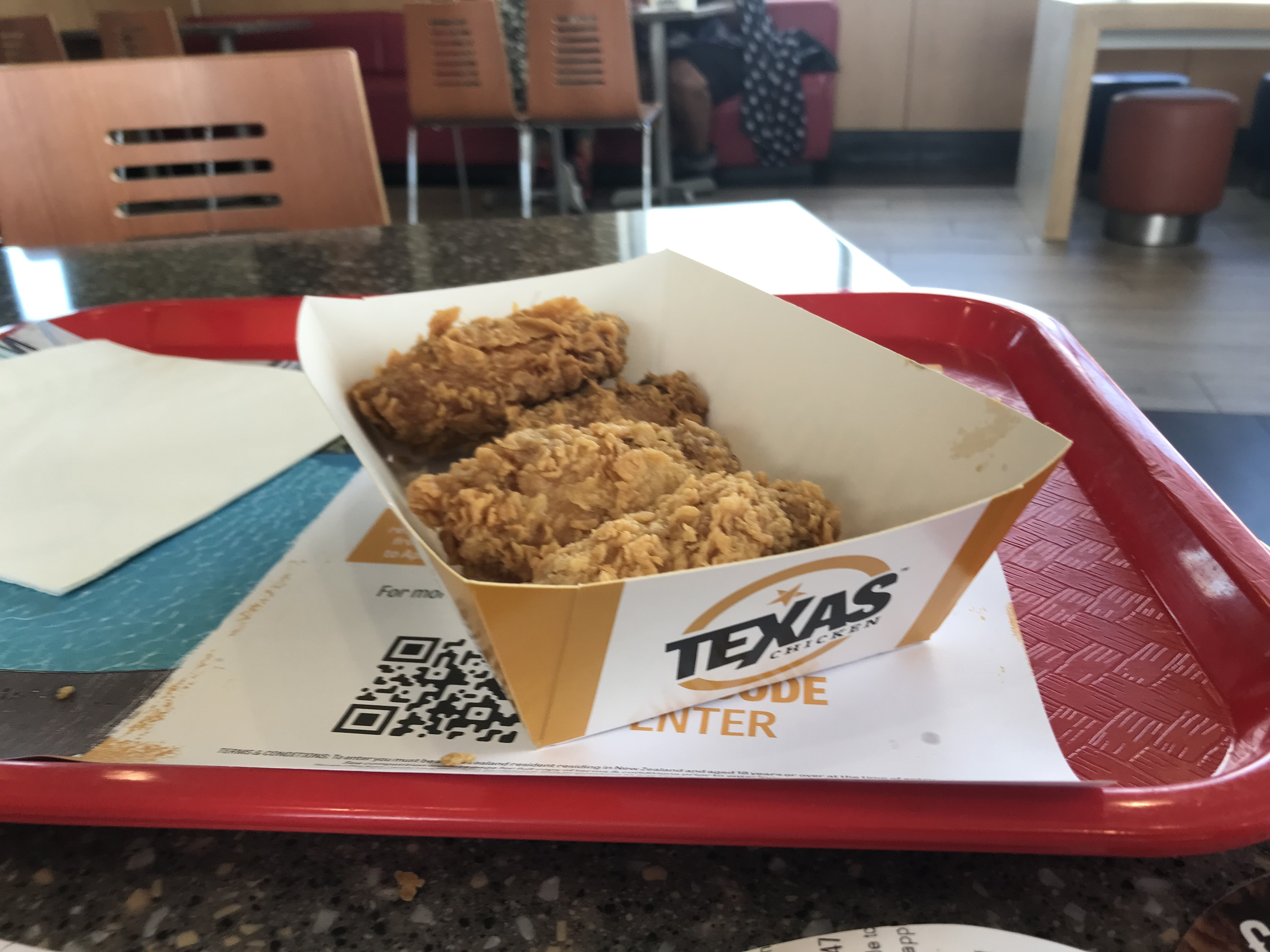
A 6-pack box of chicken wings from Texas Chicken

Church's Texas Chicken menu features a variety of fried chicken options alongside classic sides and desserts. Their menu also includes chicken tenders and boneless wings.

Accompanying these main dishes are classic Southern sides such as mashed potatoes with gravy, fried okra, coleslaw, corn on the cob and jalapeño peppers. Desserts include honey butter biscuits and apple pie. Church's Texas Chicken restaurants offer a seasonal seafood menu, featuring shrimp and crispy fish.

Since 1952, Church's Texas Chicken restaurants have served beverages supplied by The Coca-Cola Company. In 2008, the companies reaffirmed their commitment with the renewal of their existing contract, continuing to provide customers with Coca-Cola beverages. In 2021, Church's Chicken appointed Performance Food Group Company as its exclusive distributor in the United States to 2026.

== Sponsorship and philanthropy ==
In 1972, Church's Chicken sponsored The San Antonio Church's Fried Chicken Inc. First International Chess Tournament, with a first prize of $4,000, resulting in the strongest chess tournament in the United States in 50 years. From 1979 to 1986, Church's Chicken sponsored the ChessCafe Grand Prix tournaments, under the auspices of the United States Chess Federation.

Church's Partners Foundation, Inc. is a 501(c)(3) charity that supports the employees of franchisees of Church's Chicken, their families and their communities. The foundation awards $1,000 scholarships to American high school students through their Church's Scholars Program and awarded over $227,000 worth of scholarships in the 2018–2019 academic year.

Church's Chicken has partnered with No Kid Hungry since 2016.

== Incidents ==
=== United States ===
==== Oklahoma restaurant closures ====
In 2015, the Oklahoma Tax Commission shuttered 15 Church's Chicken restaurants owned by the Reciprocity Restaurant Group LLC, for not paying more than $400,000 in sales taxes to the state of Oklahoma.

==== Data breach ====
In 2019, Church's Chicken launched an investigation into a data breach of their payment processing systems. At least 160 company-owned restaurants in 11 states were affected.

==== COVID-19 pandemic ====
In response to the COVID-19 pandemic, most Church's Chicken restaurants closed their dining rooms and continued their drive-thru, counter, takeout and delivery services.

In March 2020, company executives announced a franchisee relief plan, where Church's Chicken franchisees could defer 50% of their royalties and ad fund contributions for the next four weeks.

== See also ==
- List of fast-food chicken restaurants
