= Winchester-on-the-Severn, Maryland =

- Unincorporated area
- Location within the state of Maryland Winchester-on-the-Severn, Maryland (the United States)
- Coordinates: 39°00′54″N 76°30′39″W
- Country: United States
- State: Maryland
- County: Anne Arundel
- Elevation: 0 ft (0 m)
- Time zone: UTC-5 (Eastern (EST))
  - Summer (DST): UTC-4 (EDT)

Winchester-on-the-Severn is a populated place located in Anne Arundel County, Maryland, United States.

Winchester-on-the-Severn is tied with Washington-on-the-Brazos, Texas, at 21 letters for the title of longest hyphenated placename in the United States appearing in the US Geological Survey's Geographic Names Information System.
