= Today's Golfer =

British golf magazine

- Editor: Chris Jones
- Categories: Sports magazine
- Frequency: Monthly
- Total circulation (Jan-Dec 2014): 50,133
- First issue: April 1988
- Company: Bauer
- Country: United Kingdom
- Language: English
- Website: www.todays-golfer.com

Today's Golfer is a monthly golf magazine which is published by Bauer. It was launched in April 1988 and covers topics such as the latest golf news, equipment tests and reviews, tips from tour pros, and course reviews.

== History ==
The magazine was launched in April 1988. It was the brainchild of Alun Probert who then went on to also found Fore! magazine; the launch editor was Bill Robertson. Editors have included Bob Warters and Paul Hamblin. As of 2023, the magazine's editor is Chris Jones.
