= George W. Church Sr. =

American businessman (1887–1956)

- Born: George William Church; March 30, 1887; Oak Grove, Missouri, US
- Died: November 18, 1956 (aged 69); San Antonio, Texas, US
- Known for: Founder of Church's Texas Chicken

George William Church Sr. (March 30, 1887 – November 18, 1956) was an American businessman who founded Church's Texas Chicken.

== Career ==
Church was born in Oak Grove, Missouri in 1887 to Isaac Wesley Church and Mary Josephine Webb.

On April 17, 1952, Church started Church's Fried Chicken-To-Go, across the road from The Alamo in San Antonio, Texas.

Prior to his retirement, Church was an incubator salesman.

== Personal life ==
In 1913, Church married Jessie May Pollard and had five children.

After Church's sudden death in 1956, the restaurant was willed to his son, George W. "Bill" Church, Jr. (December 23, 1932 – February 7, 2014). Bill Church continued operations of the business in 1962, and further built the franchise with his partner David Bamberger before selling it 1968.
