= Deane Beman =

American golfer and PGA Tour commissioner (born 1938)

2nd Commissioner of the PGA Tour
- In office January 1, 1974 – January 1, 1994
- Preceded by: Joseph Dey
- Succeeded by: Tim Finchem
- Golf career
- Full name: Deane Randolph Beman
- Nationality: United States
- Born: April 22, 1938 (age 88) Washington, D.C., U.S.
- Height: 5 ft 7.5 in (1.71 m)
- Weight: 150 lb (68 kg; 11 st)
- Sport: Golf
- College: University of Maryland
- Turned professional: 1967
- Former tours: PGA Tour; Champions Tour
- Professional wins: 6

Number of wins by tour
- PGA Tour: 4
- Other: 2

Best results in major championships
- Masters Tournament: T19: 1969
- PGA Championship: T36: 1972
- U.S. Open: T2: 1969
- The Open Championship: T13: 1967
- U.S. Amateur: Won: 1960, 1963
- British Amateur: Won: 1959

Achievements and awards
- World Golf Hall of Fame: 2000 (member page)
- PGA Tour Lifetime Achievement Award: 2007

Deane Randolph Beman (born April 22, 1938) is an American professional golfer and golf administrator. He was the second commissioner of the PGA Tour, serving from 1974 to 1994.

== Early life ==
Beman was born in Washington, D.C.. He attended the University of Maryland in nearby College Park where he was a two-time All-American on the Terrapins golf team.

== Amateur career ==
Following graduation, Beman had a career in the insurance field. During his playing career, he qualified for the U.S. Open at age 17 in 1955. He qualified for the Masters Tournament fourteen times, won the U.S. Amateur twice (1960, 1963), and the British Amateur (1959). He also lost a playoff to Gary Cowan for the 1966 U.S. Amateur.

== Professional career ==
In 1967, Beman turned professional at age 29 and won four times on the PGA Tour between 1969 and 1973. He led for two rounds at the 1969 U.S. Open and finished one shot out of a playoff. Beman was considered short off the tee but complemented it with his short game. Injuries curtailed his playing career. He retired as a player and closed his business practice to become PGA Tour Commissioner.

=== PGA Tour commissioner ===
Beman was the second commissioner of the PGA Tour, succeeding Joe Dey in 1974. He introduced The Players Championship concept during this time and developed the Tournament Players Club network of courses around the United States. Beman converted the Tour into a 501-c6 non-profit organization and introduced pension plans for Tour players.

Under his watch, the Tour's board passed a policy requiring all tournaments to support a charitable initiative. Tour charitable contributions grew from less than $1 million a year in 1974 to more than $30 million in 1994. He formed the Senior PGA Tour, now the PGA Tour Champions, for players 50 and older in 1980 and the Ben Hogan Tour (now Korn Ferry Tour) as golf's developmental circuit in 1990. In 1983, the Tour expanded the number of exempt players from the top-60 on the season money list to the top-125.

At a meeting on February 28, 1994, the Presidents Cup, an international competition in conjunction with Beman's retirement announcement on the 20th anniversary of his appointment as Tour commissioner. During his tenure, the PGA Tour's assets grew from $400,000 in 1974 to a reported $260 million in 1994. He was succeeded as commissioner by Tim Finchem, who served for over 22 years.

=== Senior career ===
After stepping down as tour commissioner in June 1994, Beman resumed his playing career, and competed in 69 senior events through the Constellation Energy Classic in 2005. In 2003, Beman contributed to the design of Cannon Ridge Golf Club with golf architect Bobby Weed, but the golf course was closed for play in 2012 and later again in 2017.

A book chronicling his 20-year tenure as Commissioner was published in 2011, entitled Deane Beman: Golf's Driving Force, by Adam Schupak.

== Awards and honors ==
- In 2000, Beman was inducted into the World Golf Hall of Fame
- In 2007, he was awarded the seventh PGA Tour Lifetime Achievement Award

== Amateur wins ==
- 1959 British Amateur
- 1960 U.S. Amateur, Eastern Amateur, Trans-Mississippi Amateur
- 1961 Eastern Amateur
- 1963 U.S. Amateur, Eastern Amateur
- 1964 Eastern Amateur, Porter Cup

== Professional wins (6) ==
=== PGA Tour wins (4) ===
No.	Date	Tournament	Winning score	To par	Margin of victory	Runner(s)-up
1	May 11, 1969	Texas Open Invitational	70-69-70-65=274	−10	Playoff	(United States) Jack McGowan
2	Jul 12, 1970	Greater Milwaukee Open	68-71-68-69=276	−12	3 strokes	(United States) Don Massengale
3	Oct 1, 1972	Quad Cities Open	72-69-71-67=279	−15	1 stroke	(United States) Tom Watson
4	Jul 15, 1973	Shrine-Robinson Open Golf Classic	69-68-67-67=271	−13	1 stroke	(United States) Bob Dickson, (United States) Bunky Henry

PGA Tour playoff record (1–1)

No.	Year	Tournament	Opponent	Result
1	1968	Bob Hope Desert Classic	(United States) Arnold Palmer	Lost to par on second extra hole
2	1969	Texas Open Invitational	(United States) Jack McGowan	Won with birdie on first extra hole

=== Other wins (2) ===
- 1966 Maryland Open (as an amateur)
- 1971 Quad Cities Open (not an official PGA Tour event)

== Major championships ==
=== Amateur wins (3) ===
Year	Championship	Winning score	Runner-up
1959	The Amateur Championship	3 & 2	(United States) Bill Hyndman
1960	U.S. Amateur	6 & 4	(United States) Robert W. Gardner
1963	U.S. Amateur	2 & 1	(United States) R. H. Sikes

=== Results timeline ===
Amateur

Tournament	1955	1956	1957	1958	1959	1960	1961	1962	1963	1964	1965	1966	1967
Masters Tournament					CUT	T29	CUT	CUT		T25 LA	49	CUT	T42
U.S. Open	CUT	CUT		CUT	CUT	CUT	T12	T14 LA	CUT	CUT	T11 LA	T30	–
The Open Championship										CUT			–
U.S. Amateur		R128	R32	QF	R128	1	R128	R32	1	R64	101	2	–
The Amateur Championship					1								–

Professional

Tournament	1967	1968	1969
Masters Tournament	–	CUT	T19
U.S. Open	T6	CUT	T2
The Open Championship	T13		
PGA Championship			

Tournament	1970	1971	1972	1973	1974	1975	1976	1977	1978	1979
Masters Tournament	T23	CUT		CUT						
U.S. Open	CUT	T55	CUT	T39						
The Open Championship										
PGA Championship	T55	T46	T36	T51						

Tournament	1980	1981	1982	1983	1984	1985	1986
Masters Tournament							
U.S. Open							
The Open Championship							CUT
PGA Championship							

Note: Beman turned professional between the 1967 Masters and U.S. Open.

Win
Top 10
Did not play

LA = Low amateur
"T" indicates a tie for a place
R128, R64, R32, R16, QF, SF = Round in which player lost in match play

Source for The Masters: www.masters.com

Source for U.S. Open and U.S. Amateur: USGA Championship Database

Source for British Open: www.opengolf.com

== U.S. national team appearances ==
Amateur

- Walker Cup: 1959 (winners), 1961 (winners), 1963 (winners), 1965 (tied, cup retained)
- Eisenhower Trophy: 1960 (winners), 1962 (winners), 1964, 1966
- Americas Cup: 1960 (winners), 1961 (winners), 1963 (winners)

== See also ==
- 1967 PGA Tour Qualifying School graduates

Preceded by Joseph Dey	Commissioner of the PGA Tour; 1974-1994	Succeeded by Tim Finchem
