= Porter Cup =

The Porter Cup is a 72-hole, medal-play elite amateur golf tournament held annually at the Niagara Falls Country Club in Lewiston, New York. It was first played in 1959 and over the years has hosted some of the biggest names in golf. Past champions include PGA Tour stars Phil Mickelson, David Duval, Scott Verplank and Ben Crenshaw.

== Winners ==
- 2026 Tyler Spielman
- 2025 Blake Phillips
- 2024 Chase Nevins
- 2023 Juan Martin Loureiro
- 2022 Carson Bacha
- 2021 Ben Reichert
- 2020 Canceled
- 2019 Aiden Didone
- 2018 Thomas Walsh
- 2017 Brandon Wu
- 2016 Harrison Endycott
- 2015 Denny McCarthy
- 2014 Geoff Drakeford
- 2013 Taylor Pendrith
- 2012 Richy Werenski
- 2011 Patrick Rodgers
- 2010 David Chung
- 2009 Brendan Gielow
- 2008 Adam Mitchell
- 2007 Brian Harman
- 2006 Seungsu Han
- 2005 Pablo Martin-Benavides
- 2004 Spencer Levin
- 2003 Casey Wittenberg
- 2002 Simon Nash
- 2001 Nick Cassini
- 2000 Christopher Wisler
- 1999 Hunter Haas
- 1998 Gene Elliott
- 1997 John Harris
- 1996 Joey Snyder III
- 1995 Ryuji Imada
- 1994 Allen Doyle
- 1993 Joey Gullion
- 1992 David Duval
- 1991 Gary Nicklaus
- 1990 Phil Mickelson
- 1989 Robert Gamez
- 1988 Tony Mollica
- 1987 Jay Sigel
- 1986 Nolan Henke
- 1985 Scott Verplank
- 1984 Danny Mijovic
- 1983 Scott Verplank
- 1982 Nathaniel Crosby
- 1981 Jay Sigel
- 1980 Tony DeLuca
- 1979 John Cook
- 1978 Bobby Clampett
- 1977 Vance Heafner
- 1976 Scott Simpson
- 1975 Jay Sigel
- 1974 George Burns
- 1973 Vinny Giles
- 1972 Ben Crenshaw
- 1971 Ronnie Quinn
- 1970 Howard Twitty
- 1969 Gary Cowan
- 1968 Randy Wolff
- 1967 Bob E. Smith
- 1966 Bob E. Smith
- 1965 Ward Wettlaufer
- 1964 Deane Beman
- 1963 Bill Harvey
- 1962 Ed Tutwiler
- 1961 John Konsek
- 1960 Ward Wettlaufer
- 1959 John Konsek
