= Hala Moddelmog =

American businesswoman (born 1956)

Personal details
- Born: January 3, 1956 (age 70)
- Education: Georgia Southern University (BA); University of Georgia (MA)

Hala Moddelmog (born January 3, 1956) is an American businesswoman who became the first female president and CEO of the Metro Atlanta Chamber (MAC) in January 2014, following a career in the corporate and non-profit sectors. Moddelmog has 19 years of career experience in president and CEO roles. Her areas of expertise are strategic planning, marketing, brand and product development, and assembling and managing high performance teams and brand revitalization. Moddelmog is currently the president and CEO of the Woodruff Arts Center, a role she took on in September 2020.

== Education ==
Moddelmog earned a master's degree in journalism and mass communication from the University of Georgia and a bachelor's degree in English from Georgia Southern University. She has also attended Executive Education program at Harvard University and Northwestern's Kellogg School of Management, and has her National Association of Corporate Directors (NACD) certification.

== Previous employment ==
Prior to joining MAC, Moddelmog was president of Atlanta-based Arby's Restaurant Group, an international quick-service restaurant chain with approximately 3,500 units and annual system-wide sales of approximately $3 billion. Under her leadership, Arby's had 12 consecutive quarters of comparable store sales increases and increased EBITDA by 80 percent from 2011 to 2012. Her team created new brand positioning, launched new product platforms and new advertising campaigns and redesigned the logo.

In 2006, she was chosen as president and CEO of Susan G. Komen for the Cure, the world's largest grassroots organization working to eradicate breast cancer through education, awareness, public policy and science throughout the globe. While at Komen, Moddelmog established a Scientific Advisory Board with an annual grant of $100 million for scientific research, and established the Susan G. Komen Advocacy Alliance, a 501(c)(4) designed to advocate for breast cancer patients at the federal and state level. While she was president, Komen received its first-ever 4-Star Rating from Charity Navigator, there was an increase the number of corporate sponsors and she led international mission delegations to Africa, Eastern Europe and the Middle East.

Moddelmog was the first woman to lead an international restaurant company when in 1995 she was named president of Church's Chicken, the world's third largest chicken brand with 1,500+ restaurants in 15 countries and nearly $1 billion in system sales. During her tenure, the company experienced eight years of consecutive comparable sales increases, which outpaced the food service industry growth rate.

== Personal life ==
Moddelmog resides in Atlanta, Georgia with her husband, Steve Moddelmog. They have two adult children.

== Board involvement ==
Moddelmog serves/has served on multiple boards – public, private, advisory and nonprofit – and is a frequent speaker at conferences, universities, corporations, associations, and TV and radio on topics that include her business areas of focus as well as women's business advancement and public board service. Her many board, civic and professional affiliations, past and present, include: Woodruff Arts Center, Alliance Theatre, International Women's Forum, Women Corporate Directors, The Committee of 200 (c200), United Way of Metro Atlanta, YWCA of Greater Atlanta, Women's Foodservice Forum, Atlanta Women's Foundation, Atlanta Committee for Progress, and many more. She also previously served as a director on the board of Amerigroup (NYSE:AGP) and on the board of AMN Healthcare (NYSE:AHS).

== Awards ==
- Recipient:
  - Honorary doctorate from Georgia Southern University
  - Women's Foodservice Forum Emerging Leader Award
  - International Franchise Association Bonny LeVine Award
  - Restaurant Hospitality Rising Star Award
  - Roundtable for Women in Foodservice Pacesetter Award.
  - Women of Achievement Award from the YWCA of Greater Atlanta (2003)
  - Recipient, Distinguished Alumnus Award from the American Association of State Colleges and Universities (AASCU; 2009). The first alumnus of Georgia Southern University to win the award.

== Sources ==
- NRN Article on Arby's marketing strategy; accessed April 30, 2014.
