= Henry Church =

American writer and patron of the arts (1880–1947)

- Born: January 3, 1880 New York City, U.S.
- Died: April 4, 1947 (aged 67) New York, U.S.
- Occupation: Writer
- Spouse: Barbara
- Children: 1

Henry Church (January 3, 1880 – April 4, 1947) was an American writer and patron of the arts.

== Early life ==
Henry Church was born on January 3, 1880, in Brooklyn, New York. He came from an old New England family, one of his ancestors having come to America on the Mayflower. His father James A. Church was a pharmacist at the family firm of Church and Dwight, which owned exclusive rights to the sale of bicarbonate of soda in the United States, marketing it as "baking soda" under the brand name Arm & Hammer. Henry Church would inherit money, estimated at US$90 million in today's dollars, which would later enable him to quit the family business and dedicate himself to writing and patronage of the arts.

== Young adulthood ==
Church first went to Europe in 1901 to study, living in Munich, Geneva and Paris. He returned to the U.S. in 1905. He then married and had a daughter. He returned to Europe again in 1910, living in Paris until 1912. On his third return to Europe in 1921 he was accompanied by his second wife Barbara, who was born in Bavaria and whose father was a wealthy coal merchant.

Henry and Barbara settled into a large villa in Ville-d'Avray, a posh suburb of Paris, which was composed of three older houses reconstructed and redesigned by the modernist architect Le Corbusier. They dabbled in art collecting and literary patronage, including the publication of Church's own work, written in French. However, Church soon felt he was being taken advantage of, and eventually he hired a financial advisor to help structure his further patronage of the arts.

== 1930s ==
In the 1930s, Henry met the influential Paris editor Jean Paulhan, who at that time was the editor in chief of the Nouvelle Revue Française (NRF). Church enabled Paulhan to found his own literary journal, Mesures, a quarterly that ran from 1935 to 1940. Church officially edited Mesures (to avoid giving Paulhan the appearance of a conflict with the NRF), but Paulhan secretly recommended all the contributions and directed the editorial work. Church nonetheless had an active role in the selection committee.

Mesures did not sell well, and in 1938 Church noted in a letter to Paulhan that each issue cost 30,000 francs to produce but produced an income of only 1,000 francs. Henri Michaux, a member of the journal's selection committee, wrote to Paulhan in 1939:

Why don't you finally lay out the truth for Mr. Church, who claims to be seeking it? Tell him the reason his magazine doesn't sell is that it's boring. There are never any surprizes. And if for once someone submits something amusing, even something uniquely amusing, you see the result [i.e. rejection by Church].

Despite this criticism, Paulhan was proud of the journal. In 1937, its third year, he wrote in a letter:

It seems to me that I can be proud of Mesures; it is the handsomest magazine in Europe. Maybe its positions are a little inflexible, but they are never low. Maybe it is a bit esoteric, but no review of pure literature can avoid being so from time to time. The truth is that the journals and little magazines of Geneva, Brussels, London, and New York often say that Mesures does honor to France; the French press, however, says this sort of thing more seldom.

== Later life ==
On July 11, 1939, the Churches left France for America in order to flee World War II. They took up residence in the Plaza hotel in New York. Mesures continued to publish, with Henry's support, until the German invasion closed the printing press they had been using. The last issue came out in April 1940. Church also subsidized some of the contributors to Mesures during the war years, for as long as money continued to circulate between the U.S. and occupied France.

Church and Wallace Stevens then tried to persuade Paulhan to move to the United States, discussing the possibility of Church funding a chair in poetry at Harvard University to which they proposed to nominate Paulhan. The plan was never realized, however.

Church then contributed to the Creative Arts Program at Princeton University. One of his contributions was to fund a series of lectures, at which Wallace Stevens read a piece which gave rise to his long poem "Notes Towards a Supreme Fiction" (1942), which is dedicated to Church. Although Church wrote poetry himself, he never shared it with Stevens.

The Churches returned to Paris in 1946, finding their villa in bad condition after having been occupied by German troops. They returned to New York in early 1947, where Henry died unexpectedly on Good Friday (that year April 4), of a heart attack. His death prompted Wallace Stevens to write the poem "The Owl in the Sarcophagus".

== Works ==
- Les Clowns, with drawings by Georges Rouault, editions des Deux Amis, 1922.
- Indésirables, Librairie de France, collections des Deux Amis, 1922.
- L'indifférente, Hors commerce, Paris, 1929
- Vasthi. Tragi-comédie, en un acte, tirée du livre d'Esther et adaptée pour un théatre de marionnettes, Hors Commerce, Paris, 1929.
