= Maureen Elizabeth Church =

Welsh botanist and illustrator (1930–2016)

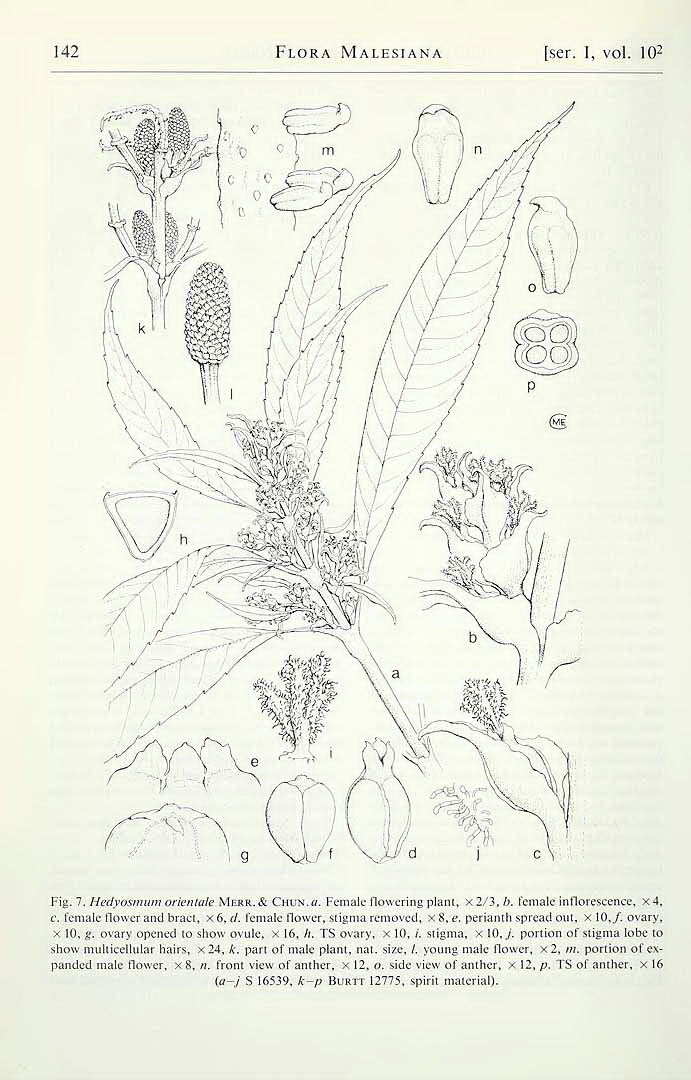
Hedyosmum orientale Flora Malesiana

Pistacia aethiopica Flora of Tropical East Africa

Maureen Elizabeth Church (née Griffiths; 16 January 1930 – 7 January 2016) was a Welsh-born botanist and a self-trained botanical illustrator. Her preferred technique was that of line drawings and her work is in the permanent collections of the Forest Herbarium in Oxford, the East African Herbarium in Nairobi, the Herbarium at Kew, and the University of Edinburgh.

== Life and career ==
Maureen Elizabeth Griffiths was born in Swansea, Wales on 16 January 1930. She was awarded a B.Sc. (Botany) by the University of Sheffield in 1952, after which she attended St Hilda's College, Oxford.

The Daubeny Herbarium in Oxford was the herbarium of the former Department of Forestry. Miss Maureen Griffiths arrived there as Herbarium Assistant in 1952 and started work on her thesis, "The Taxonomy and Ecology of the African species of Terminalia", at the same time preparing the illustrations for this work. In 1957 she left to start a career in free-lance illustrating.

Church died on 7 January 2016, aged 85.

Terminalia griffithsiana Liben was named in her honour.

== Publications ==
- A revision of the African species of Terminalia - Maureen E. Griffiths, Journal of the Linnean Society of London, Botany, Volume 55, Issue 364, pages 818–907, June 1959
- Kenya Trees and Shrubs - Ivan R. Dale & P. J. Greenway (1961) Buchanan's Kenya Estates Ltd.
- Forest Flora of Northern Rhodesia - F. White (1962) Oxford University Press
- Flora of Turkey and the East Aegean Islands - Peter H. Davies (1967) Edinburgh University Press
- Flora of Tropical East Africa - Convolvulaceae - Verdcourt, B. (1963) London: Crown Agents for Oversea Governments and Administrations
- Common Poisonous Plants of East Africa - Verdcourt, Bernard & E. C. Trump, Collins, 1969. Hardcover, 254 pgs, map, botanical illustrations by Mrs. M. E. Church
- Some Common Flowering Plants of Uganda - Edna Margaret Lind & A. C. Tallantire (1971) Oxford University Press
- Flora of Tropical East Africa - Flacourtiaceae - Sleumer, H., 1975
- Flora of Tropical East Africa - Rubiaceae (Part 1) - Verdcourt, B. (1976). Prepared at the Royal Botanic Gardens, Kew with assistance from the East African Herbarium.
- Leguminosae of Ethiopia - Thulin, M. (1983), 49 line drawings by Maureen E. Church. Opera Botanica, Copenhagen 68: 1–223
- Flora of Tropical East Africa - Nymphaceae, Verbenaceae - B Verdcourt, AA Balkema 1989, 1992
- Flora of Tropical East Africa - Boraginaceae - Verdcourt, B. (1991). Prepared at the Royal Botanic Gardens, Kew with assistance from the East African Herbarium.
- Leguminosae of Ethiopia
- Dendrochilum of Borneo
