= Henry Church (politician) =

American politician (died 1850)

Member of the Pennsylvania House of Representatives from the Cumberland County district
- In office 1850 – October 10, 1850

Personal details
- Died: October 10, 1850 Bridgeport, Cumberland County, Pennsylvania, U.S.
- Resting place: Saint John's Cemetery; Shiremanstown, Pennsylvania, U.S.
- Party: Democratic
- Spouse: Julia A.
- Occupation: Politician

Henry Church (died October 10, 1850) was an American politician from Pennsylvania.

== Biography ==
Henry Church was born around 1819. He was engaged in the lumber industry and in bridge construction. He was elected as a Democrat to the Pennsylvania House of Representatives, representing Cumberland County from 1850 to his death.

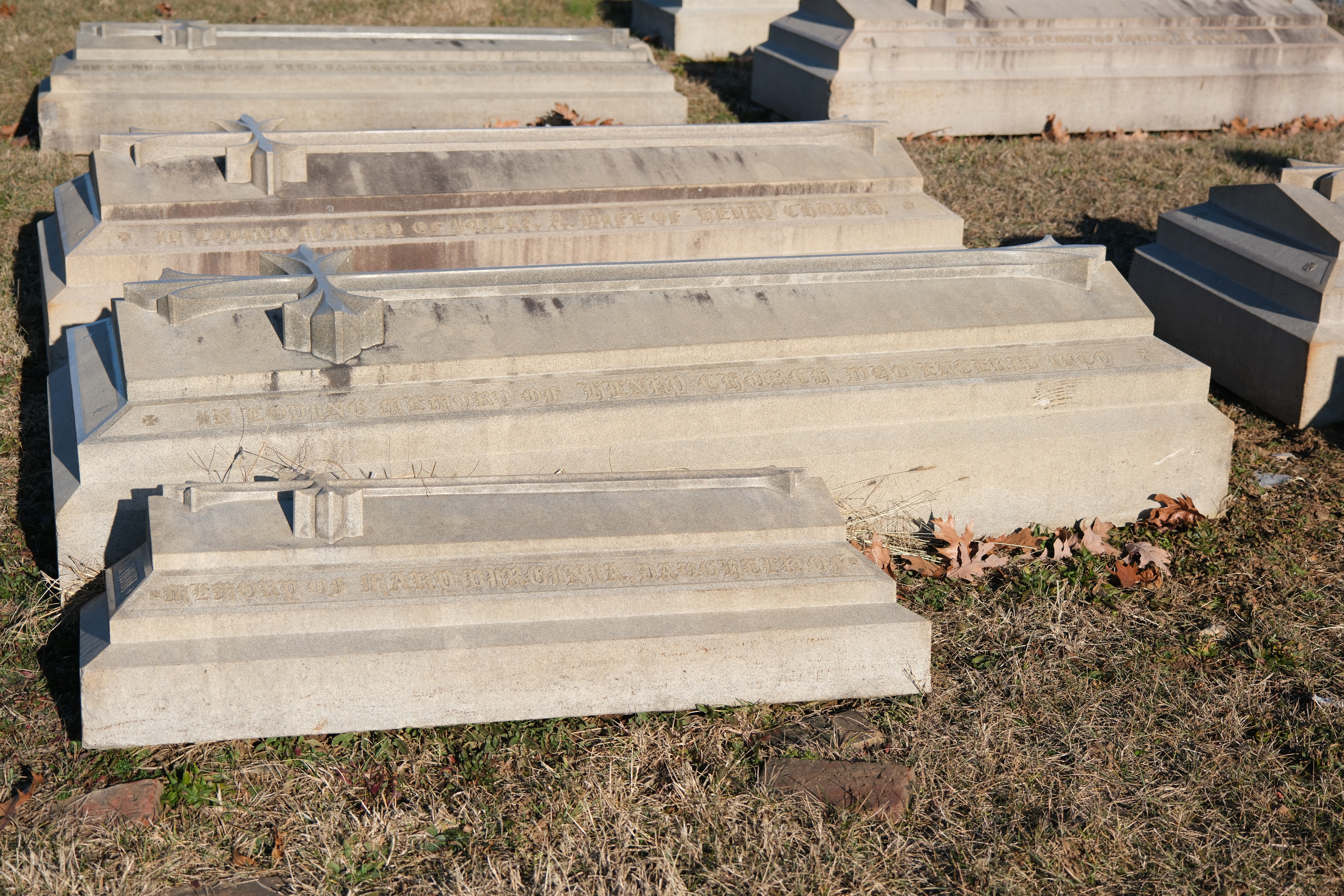
Grave of Church (second from bottom) at Saint John's Cemetery

Church married Julia A. They had a son, Henry A. Muhlenburg. He died prior to the start of his second term. He died on October 10, 1850, in Bridgeport, Cumberland County. He was buried in Saint John's Cemetery in Shiremanstown.
