= Men's Home Internationals (golf) =

Amateur team golf competition

Tournament information
- Established: 1932
- Course: Hankley Common Golf Club (2021)
- Format: Team match play
- Final year: 2021

Final champion
- Ireland

The Men's Home Internationals were an amateur team golf championship for men between the four Home Nations. Ireland was represented by the whole island of Ireland.The event was organised by The R&A. The inaugural event was held in 1932 and the venue cycled between the four nations. The winning team received the Raymond Trophy, presented by Raymond Oppenheimer, an ex-England and Walker Cup captain, in 1952. In 2022 the match was replaced by a combined Women's and Men's Home Internationals.

== History ==
An England–Scotland Amateur Match had been first played in 1902. It was played in connection with the Amateur Championship, on the Saturday either before or after the championship. Starting in 1927 Scotland and Ireland had also played an annual match. In 1927 and 1929 this was held in Ireland, before the Irish Amateur Open Championship, while in 1928 and 1930 it was held in Scotland, just before the England–Scotland match.

The 1931 Amateur Championship was held at Royal North Devon. On the previous occasions that it had been held there, there were far fewer Scottish entries than normal and as a consequence, the Scottish team in the England–Scotland Match was not fully representative. It was therefore decided to hold the match at a different time and on a different venue, being played at Royal Liverpool in August. In addition, it was decided to play a match between England and Ireland on the day before. Ireland and Scotland had already decided to hold their match in Ireland in September. It was later arranged that a Welsh team should attend, playing matches against Scotland and Ireland on the days when England was playing Ireland and Scotland. Scotland beat England 7–6, England beat Ireland 10–4 while Wales lost 2–12 to Scotland and 2–11 to Ireland. England did not play Wales. With Scotland winning both their matches and then beating Ireland 7–6 the following month, they were regarded as the unofficial champion country.

The first tournament was held at Troon Golf Club on 2, 3, and 5 August 1932, there being no matches on the 4th. Matches followed the previous format with 5 foursome matches in the morning and 10 singles in the afternoon. Scotland and England beat Ireland and Wales on the first two days. On the final day, Scotland beat England 8–7 to win the title while Ireland beat Wales 9½–5½.

The 1933 tournament was held at Royal County Down Golf Club from 14 to 16 September. The results of all six matches were the same as in 1932, Scotland beating England in the decisive match. In the 1934 tournament at Royal Porthcawl Golf Club from 15 to 17 August, Ireland beat England on opening day. With Scotland beating England, Scotland retained the title with Ireland the runners-up. The 1935 event was held at Royal Lytham & St Annes Golf Club from 7 to 9 August. The tournament resulted in a triple-tie; England beat Ireland on the opening day, Ireland beat Scotland on the second day, and then Scotland beat England on the final day. As in previous years, Wales lost all their matches.

The 1936 event was held at Prestwick Golf Club from 29 to 31 July. Scotland beat England on the final day to win the tournament, England finishing second and Ireland third. There was a surprise on the opening day of the 1937 tournament at Portmarnock Golf Club when Wales tied their match with Scotland. Played from 1 to 3 September it was the first time the event had been held in the Irish Free State. Despite their tie, Scotland retained the title by winning their other two matches, with England again the runners-up. Royal Porthcawl hosted the event for second time in 1938, from 21 to 23 September. England gained the title after beating Scotland for the first time. Scotland was runners-up with Ireland third. The 1939 matches were planned for 20 to 22 September at Royal Lytham but were cancelled because of the start of World War II.

The tournament resumed in 1947 at Royal Liverpool from 24 to 26 September. England and Scotland won their opening two matches. On the final day, England beat Scotland 8–7 while Ireland beat Wales to finish third. The England/Scotland match went to the final green of the final match. Duncan Sutherland and Jack Pressley were all square at the last hole but Pressley took 5 to Sutherland's 4 to give England a narrow win. England retained the title in 1948 at Muirfield, played from 22 to 24 September. England beat Scotland and Ireland on the opening two days but only beat Wales 8–6 on the final day. Ireland beat Scotland to be runners-up with Scotland third. The 1949 event was held at Portmarnock from 16 to 18 May. England again won the title, although they only narrowly beat Ireland 7–6 on the final day. Wales beat Scotland 8–6 on the last day to gain their first win in the event and finish third with Scotland losing all their matches.

The 1950 event was held at Royal St. David's from 27 to 29 September. Heavy rain on the first day meant that the singles matches were not played, and were rearranged for Saturday morning, 30 September. Ireland won their opening two matches while Scotland beat England and tied with Wales. This meant that Scotland needed to beat Ireland on the final morning to win the title. Scotland held a 3–2 lead after the foursomes but Ireland won the singles 4–3 to tie the match and win the title outright for the first time. England beat Wales to finish in third place. The 1951 tournament was played at Royal Lytham & St Annes Golf Club. Ireland seemed the likely winner after beating Scotland and England, but they lost their last match to Wales 8–4, while Scotland beat England 7–6 to get their second win and tie with Ireland. Scotland won the 1952 event at Troon Golf Club, winning all three matches for the first time since 1936. England took second place. The singles could not be played on the second day, a Thursday, and were played on the Saturday. Scotland retained the title in 1953 at Killarney Golf Club, winning two matches and halving their final match against Ireland, who were runners-up.

The event was staged by England Golf, Scottish Golf, the Golfing Union of Ireland and Wales Golf until 2020 - The R&A took over organising from 2021.

== Format ==
Each team played the other three teams over three successive days. In the final format each team had 11 players. Each match involved 5 18-hole foursomes in the morning and 10 18-hole singles in the afternoon.

== Results ==
Year	Venue	Location	Winner	W	Runner-up	W	Third	W	Fourth	W	Refs.
2021	Hankley Common	England	Ireland	2.5	Scotland	2	England	1.5	Wales	0	
2020	Royal Dornoch	Scotland	Cancelled due to the COVID-19 pandemic								
2019	Lahinch	Ireland	England	3	Scotland	2	Ireland	1	Wales	0	
2018	Conwy	Wales	England	3	Ireland	2	Scotland	1	Wales	0	
2017	Moortown	England	Ireland	2.5/26.5	England	2.5/26	Wales	1	Scotland	0	
2016	Nairn	Scotland	Ireland	3	England	2	Scotland	1	Wales	0	
2015	Royal Portrush	Ireland	Ireland	2.5	Scotland	2	England	1.5	Wales	0	
2014	Southerndown	Wales	Ireland	3	Wales	1.5	Scotland	1	England	0.5	
2013	Ganton	England	England	3	Ireland	2	Scotland	1	Wales	0	
2012	Glasgow Gailes	Scotland	Scotland	2/27	Ireland	2/25	England	2/23.5	Wales	0	
2011	County Sligo	Ireland	England	2/27	Ireland	2/25.5	Scotland	2/22	Wales	0	
2010	Ashburnham	Wales	England	3	Scotland	1/24	Wales	1/18.5	Ireland	1/17.5	
2009	Hillside	England	England	3	Scotland	2	Wales	1	Ireland	0	
2008	Muirfield	Scotland	Ireland	3	Scotland	2	England	1	Wales	0	
2007	County Louth	Ireland	England	2.5	Ireland	1.5/24	Scotland	1.5/21.5	Wales	0.5	
2006	Pyle & Kenfig	Wales	Scotland	3	England	2	Wales	1	Ireland	0	
2005	Royal St George's	England	Scotland	2/26.5	England	2/21.5	Wales	1/21.5	Ireland	1/20.5	
2004	Prestwick	Scotland	England	2/25.5	Scotland	2/24.5	Wales	1/20.5	Ireland	1/19.5	
2003	Ballybunion	Ireland	Ireland	2.5	Scotland	2	Wales	1	England	0.5	
2002	Royal St. David's	Wales	Wales	3	Scotland	1.5	England	1	Ireland	0.5	
2001	Woodhall Spa	England	England	2.5	Scotland	2	Ireland	1	Wales	0.5	
2000	Carnoustie	Scotland	Scotland	2	Ireland	1.5/24	Wales	1.5/22	England	1	
1999	Royal County Down	Ireland	England	3	Ireland	2	Scotland	1	Wales	0	
1998	Royal Porthcawl	Wales	England	3	Ireland	1.5/25.5	Wales	1.5/23	Scotland	0	
1997	Burnham & Berrow	England	England	2.5/28.5	Ireland	2.5/26.5	Scotland	1	Wales	0	
1996	Moray	Scotland	England	2.5	Ireland	2	Scotland	1.5	Wales	0	
1995	Royal Portrush	Ireland	England	2/25	Ireland	2/24.5	Scotland	1/23	Wales	1/17.5	
1994	Ashburnham	Wales	England	3	Ireland	2	Scotland	1	Wales	0	
1993	Royal Liverpool	England	England	2.5	Wales	2	Ireland	1	Scotland	0.5	
1992	Prestwick	Scotland	Ireland	2.5/31	England	2.5/27.5	Scotland	1	Wales	0	
1991	County Sligo	Ireland	Ireland	2.5	Wales	1.5	Scotland	1/21.5	England	1/18.5	
1990	Conwy	Wales	Ireland	3	England and Scotland tied			1/22.5	Wales	1/17	
1989	Ganton	England	England	3	Scotland	2	Ireland	1	Wales	0	
1988	Muirfield	Scotland	England	3	Ireland	1.5/24.5	Wales	1.5/19.5	Scotland	0	
1987	Lahinch (Note: The first set of matches was reduced to 10 singles because of bad weather.)	Ireland	Ireland	3	England	1.5	Scotland	1	Wales	0.5	
1986	Royal St. David's	Wales	Scotland	3	Ireland	1.5	England	1	Wales	0.5	
1985	Formby	England	England	3	Wales	2	Ireland	1	Scotland	0	
1984	Royal Troon (Note: The last set of matches was reduced to 10 singles because of bad weather.)	Scotland	England	2/24.5	Scotland	2/24	Ireland	1.5	Wales	0.5	
1983	Portmarnock	Ireland	Ireland	2.5	Scotland	2	England	1.5	Wales	0	
1982	Royal Porthcawl	Wales	Scotland	2/24.5	England	2/23.5	Ireland	1.5	Wales	0.5	
1981	Woodhall Spa	England	Scotland	3	Ireland	2	England	0.5/18	Wales	0.5/17.5	
1980	Royal Dornoch	Scotland	England	2.5	Ireland	2	Wales	1	Scotland	0.5	
1979	Royal County Down	Ireland	Cancelled								
1978	Ashburnham	Wales	England	3	Ireland, Scotland and Wales tied					1	
1977	Hillside	England	England	3	Scotland	2	Wales	1	Ireland	0	
1976	Muirfield	Scotland	Scotland	3	England	2	Ireland	1	Wales	0	
1975	Portmarnock	Ireland	Scotland	3	England	2	Ireland	1	Wales	0	
1974	Royal St. David's	Wales	England	2.5	Scotland	2	Ireland	1	Wales	0.5	
1973	Royal Lytham & St Annes	England	England	3	Scotland	1.5	Ireland	1	Wales	0.5	
1972	Troon	Scotland	England and Scotland tied			2.5	Ireland	1	Wales	0	
1971	Formby	England	Scotland	3	England	2	Ireland	1	Wales	0	
1970	Royal Porthcawl	Wales	Scotland	3	Ireland	1.5	Wales	1	England	0.5	
1969	Killarney	Ireland	England	2.5	Ireland	1.5	Scotland and Wales tied			1	
1968	Gullane	Scotland	England	3	Scotland	2	Ireland	1	Wales	0	
1967	Ganton	England	Scotland	3	England	2	Ireland	1	Wales	0	
1966	Royal Porthcawl	Wales	England	3	Ireland	2	Scotland	1	Wales	0	
1965	Royal Portrush	Ireland	England	3	Ireland	2	Scotland	1	Wales	0	
1964	Carnoustie	Scotland	England	3	Ireland	2	Scotland	1	Wales	0	
1963	Royal Lytham & St Annes	England	England, Ireland and Scotland tied					2	Wales	0	
1962	Royal Porthcawl	Wales	England, Ireland and Scotland tied					2	Wales	0	
1961	Portmarnock	Ireland	Scotland	3	Ireland	2	Wales	1	England	0	
1960	Turnberry	Scotland	England	2.5	Ireland	2	Scotland	1.5	Wales	0	
1959	Royal Lytham & St Annes	England	England, Ireland and Scotland tied					2	Wales	0	
1958	Royal Porthcawl	Wales	England	3	Scotland	2	Wales	1	Ireland	0	
1957	Royal County Down	Ireland	England	3	Scotland	2	Wales	1	Ireland	0	
1956	Muirfield	Scotland	Scotland	3	England	2	Wales	1	Ireland	0	
1955	Royal Birkdale	England	Ireland	2.5	Scotland	2	England	1.5	Wales	0	
1954	Royal Porthcawl	Wales	England	3	Ireland, Scotland and Wales tied					1	
1953	Killarney	Ireland	Scotland	2.5	Ireland	1.5	England and Wales tied			1	
1952	Troon	Scotland	Scotland	3	England	1.5	Ireland	1	Wales	0.5	
1951	Royal Lytham & St Annes	England	Ireland and Scotland tied			2	England and Wales tied			1	
1950	Royal St. David's	Wales	Ireland	2.5	Scotland	2	England	1	Wales	0.5	
1949	Portmarnock	Ireland	England	3	Ireland	2	Wales	1	Scotland	0	
1948	Muirfield	Scotland	England	3	Ireland	2	Scotland	1	Wales	0	
1947	Royal Liverpool	England	England	3	Scotland	2	Ireland	1	Wales	0	
1939–1946: Not held
1938	Royal Porthcawl	Wales	England	3	Scotland	2	Ireland	1	Wales	0	
1937	Portmarnock	Ireland	Scotland	2.5	England	2	Ireland	1	Wales	0.5	
1936	Prestwick	Scotland	Scotland	3	England	2	Ireland	1	Wales	0	
1935	Royal Lytham & St Annes	England	England, Ireland and Scotland tied					2	Wales	0	
1934	Royal Porthcawl	Wales	Scotland	3	Ireland	2	England	1	Wales	0	
1933	Royal County Down	Ireland	Scotland	3	England	2	Ireland	1	Wales	0	
1932	Troon	Scotland	Scotland	3	England	2	Ireland	1	Wales	0	

=== Match scores ===
The following table gives the match scores. For a particular event these will not be in chronological order. E=England, I=Ireland, S=Scotland, W=Wales.

Match Scores
Year	E–I	E–S	E–W	I–S	I–W	S–W
2021	7.5–7.5	5–10	10.5–4.5	8.5–6.5	11–4	11–4
2019	10–5	9–6	12–3	6.5–8.5	12–3	9.5–5.5
2018	8.5–6.5	8–7	11.5–3.5	11.5–3.5	9.5–5.5	8–7
2017	7.5–7.5	9–6	9.5–5.5	10–5	9–6	5.5–9.5
2016	7–8	8.5–6.5	11.5–3.5	8.5–6.5	8–7	8–7
2015	7.5–7.5	7–8	8.5–6.5	11–4	9.5–5.5	11.5–3.5
2014	6–9	7–8	7.5–7.5	10–5	8–7	7–8
2013	8–7	9–6	11–4	8.5–6.5	9–6	9.5–5.5
2012	9.5–5.5	4.5–10.5	9.5–5.5	8–7	11.5–3.5	9.5–5.5
2011	7–8	10.5–4.5	9.5–5.5	6.5–8.5	11–4	9–6
2010	11–4	8–7	11–4	5–10	8.5–6.5	7–8
2009	9.5–5.5	9.5–5.5	10.5–4.5	3–12	7–8	12.5–2.5
2008	5–10	5–10	8.5–6.5	9.5–5.5	11.5–3.5	9.5–5.5
2007	8.5–6.5	9–6	7.5–7.5	7.5–7.5	10–5	8–7
2006	9–6	5–10	8.5–6.5	7–8	7–8	9–6
2005	8.5–6.5	3.5–11.5	9.5–5.5	5–10	9–6	5–10
2004	8.5–6.5	7–8	10–5	4–11	9–6	5.5–9.5
2003	7–8	7.5–7.5	5–10	7.5–7.5	8–7	9.5–5.5
2002	10–5	5–10	7–8	7.5–7.5	6.5–8.5	6–9
2001	11.5–3.5	9–6	7.5–7.5	6.5–8.5	10.5–4.5	10.5–4.5
2000	5.5–9.5	7.5–7.5	7.5–7.5	7.5–7.5	7–8	8.5–6.5
1999	8.5–6.5	10–5	11.5–3.5	10.5–4.5	8–7	10.5–4.5
1998	8–7	9–6	11–4	11–4	7.5–7.5	3.5–11.5
1997	7.5–7.5	10.5–4.5	10.5–4.5	10.5–4.5	8.5–6.5	9–6
1996	10–5	7.5–7.5	9–6	8.5–6.5	9.5–5.5	9–6
1995	9–6	9.5–5.5	6.5–8.5	8.5–6.5	10–5	11–4
1994	9–6	9.5–5.5	10–5	11–4	10.5–4.5	8–7
1993	9.5–5.5	8–7	7.5–7.5	8.5–6.5	6.5–8.5	7.5–7.5
1992	7.5–7.5	11.5–3.5	8.5–6.5	12.5–2.5	11–4	8–7
1991	4–11	5.5–9.5	9–6	10–5	7.5–7.5	7–8
1990	7–8	5.5–9.5	10–5	9–6	11–4	7–8
1989	8–7	9–6	12–3	6.5–8.5	11–4	8–7
1988	8–7	9–6	11–4	10–5	7.5–7.5	7–8
1987	4–6	9–6	7.5–7.5	10.5–4.5	8–7	6.5–3.5
1986	7–8	5.5–9.5	9–6	4.5–10.5	7.5–7.5	10–5
1985	9.5–5.5	8–7	11–4	11.5–3.5	5.5–9.5	7–8
1984	4–6	8–7	12.5–2.5	5–10	7.5–7.5	7–3
1983	7.5–7.5	6.5–8.5	9–6	9.5–5.5	10–5	8–7
1982	8.5–6.5	7–8	8–7	8–7	7.5–7.5	9.5–5.5
1981	7–8	3.5–11.5	7.5–7.5	6–9	10.5–4.5	9.5–5.5
1980	7.5–7.5	11–4	10–5	9–6	7.5–7.5	7.5–7.5
1978	8.5–6.5	9–6	8.5–6.5	6–9	8–7	7–8
1977	8.5–6.5	8–7	9–6	3.5–11.5	6–9	10–5
1976	10.5–4.5	5–10	10–5	5–10	8–7	9–6
1975	10.5–4.5	5.5–9.5	11–4	4.5–10.5	9–6	13–2
1974	11–4	10.5–4.5	7.5–7.5	6–9	8–7	9–6
1973	10.5–4.5	9–6	9.5–5.5	5.5–9.5	10.5–4.5	7.5–7.5
1972	8–7	7.5–7.5	10.5–4.5	6.5–8.5	12–3	10.5–4.5
1971	12–3	7–8	8.5–6.5	6.5–8.5	9.5–5.5	12–3
1970	7.5–7.5	5–10	6.5–8.5	5–10	8–7	10–5
1969	7.5–7.5	10.5–4.5	11–4	7–8	8–7	7–8
1968	12–3	9.5–5.5	11–4	7–8	9–6	9–6
1967	10.5–4.5	7–8	10.5–4.5	6.5–8.5	8.5–6.5	8–7
1966	12.5–2.5	8–7	8–7	10.5–4.5	9–6	8–7
1965	8.5–6.5	11.5–3.5	8–7	9.5–5.5	10.5–4.5	9–6
1964	8.5–6.5	8–7	13–2	8–7	10–5	12.5–2.5
1963	8.5–6.5	4.5–10.5	9–6	10–5	11–4	10.5–4.5
1962	8.5–6.5	6–9	11.5–3.5	8–7	10.5–4.5	9–6
1961	7–8	2.5–12.5	3–12	3.5–11.5	11–4	8–7
1960	8–7	7.5–7.5	11.5–3.5	8–7	12–3	9–6
1959	6.5–8.5	10–5	11.5–3.5	6.5–8.5	8–7	10–5
1958	9–6	8–7	11.5–3.5	6.5–8.5	7–8	10.5–4.5
1957	10.5–4.5	12–3	9–6	2–13	6.5–8.5	10–5
1956	11–4	5.5–9.5	10.5–4.5	7–8	6–9	10.5–4.5
1955	7.5–7.5	7–8	9.5–5.5	9–6	8.5–6.5	8–7
1954	8.5–6.5	9–6	12–3	9–6	7–8	9–6
1953	6–9	6.5–8.5	9–6	7.5–7.5	6.5–8.5	10–5
1952	7.5–7.5	6–9	9–6	5.5–9.5	7.5–7.5	10–5
1951	7–8	7–8	10–5	8.5–6.5	5.5–9.5	8–7
1950	7–8	6–9	8–7	7.5–7.5	10–5	7.5–7.5
1949	8–7	10–5	10–5	10.5–4.5	10.5–4.5	6.5–8.5
1948	8–7	10.5–4.5	8.5–6.5	10.5–4.5	12.5–2.5	11–4
1947	9–6	8–7	14–1	5–10	12–3	11–4
1938	10–5	8.5–6.5	10.5–4.5	5.5–9.5	9–6	8.5–6.5
1937	8–7	6–9	8.5–6.5	5.5–9.5	9–6	7.5–7.5
1936	13–2	7–8	12–3	7–8	11–4	9.5–5.5
1935	8.5–6.5	2.5–12.5	10.5–4.5	9–6	11.5–3.5	10.5–4.5
1934	3–12	5–10	10–5	4.5–10.5	10–5	9.5–5.5
1933	9.5–5.5	5.5–9.5	9–6	6–9	11–4	11–4
1932	12–3	7–8	11.5–3.5	4–11	9.5–5.5	9–6

== Teams ==
This list is incomplete

The following played in at least one match.

=== England ===
- 2021 Sam Bairstow, Callan Barrow, Jack Bigham, Zachary Chegwidden, Jack Dyer, Arron Edwards-Hill, John Gough, Josh Hill, Olly Huggins, Haider Hussain, Laird Shepherd
- 2019 Jake Burnage, Callum Farr, Bailey Gill, Harry Hall, Ben Hutchinson, Ben Jones, Matty Lamb, Joshua McMahon, Thomas Plumb, Ben Schmidt, Tom Sloman
- 2018 Jake Burnage, Bailey Gill, David Hague, Ben Jones, David Langley, Joe Long, Thomas Plumb, Nick Poppleton, Tom Sloman, Mitch Waite, Andrew Wilson
- 2017 Dan Brown, Jack Burnage, Todd Clements, Jack Gaunt, David Hague, Josh Hilleard, Matthew Jordan, Bradley Moore, Gian-Marco Petrozzi, Tom Sloman, Will Whiteoak
- 2016 Dan Brown, Adam Chapman, Will Enefer, Harry Hall, Josh Hilleard, Marco Penge, Gian-Marco Petrozzi, Alfie Plant, Ashton Turner, James Walker, Jack Yule
- 2015 Tomasz Anderson, Jamie Bower, Dan Brown, Ashley Chesters, Joe Dean, Paul Kinnear, Jimmy Mullen, Alfie Plant, Ben Taylor, Sean Towndrow, Ashton Turner
- 2014 Tomasz Anderson, Harry Casey, Adam Chapman, Ashley Chesters, Sebastian Crookall-Nixon, Ryan Evans, Luke Johnson, Paul Kinnear, Nick Marsh, Ben Stow, Dan Wasteney
- 2013 Harry Casey, Ryan Evans, Craig Hinton, Paul Howard, Nick Marsh, Jimmy Mullen, Jamie Rutherford, Michael Saunders, Callum Shinkwin, Ben Stow, Toby Tree
- 2012 Sebastian Crookall-Nixon, Harry Ellis, Jack Hiluta, Nathan Kimsey, Garrick Porteous, Neil Raymond, Jamie Rutherford, Callum Shinkwin, Jordan Smith, Ben Stow, Joshua White
- 2011 Steven Brown, Dave Coupland, Tyrrell Hatton, Craig Hinton, Ben Loughrey, Garrick Porteous, Neil Raymond, Jack Senior, Ben Stow, Andy Sullivan, Ben Taylor
- 2010 Jamie Abbott, Laurie Canter, Tommy Fleetwood, Tom Lewis, Chris Lloyd, Matthew Nixon, Chris Paisley, Eddie Pepperell, Jack Senior, Matthew Southgate, Darren Wright
- 2009 Jamie Abbott, Tommy Fleetwood, Luke Goddard, Matt Haines, Stiggy Hodgson, Sam Hutsby, Farren Keenan, Matthew Nixon, Chris Paisley, James Robinson, Dale Whitnell
- 2008 Jamie Abbott, Todd Adcock, Tommy Fleetwood, Charlie Ford, Luke Goddard, Sam Hutsby, Matt Haines, Farren Keenan, Eddie Pepperell, Tom Sherreard, Steve Uzzell, Dale Whitnell
- 2007 Matthew Baldwin, Gary Boyd, Matthew Cryer, Ben Evans, Charlie Ford, Sam Hutsby, Ben Parker, Dale Whitnell, Danny Willett, Gary Wolstenholme, Chris Wood
- 2006 Gary Boyd, Robert Dinwiddie, Oliver Fisher, Adam Gee, Steve Lewton, Ross McGowan, Jamie Moul, Ben Parker, Edward Richardson, Paul Waring, Gary Wolstenholme
- 2005 James Crampton, Matthew Cryer, Robert Dinwiddie, Oliver Fisher, Adam Gee, Jamie Moul, Edward Richardson, James Ruth, Steven Tiley, Paul Waring, Gary Wolstenholme
- 2004 Lee Corfield, Robert Dinwiddie, Lawrence Dodd, Adam Gee, James Heath, Gary Lockerbie, Matthew Richardson, James Ruth, Michael Skelton, Steven Tiley, Gary Wolstenholme
- 2003 Paul Bradshaw, Graeme Clark, Colin Edwards, Ross Fisher, James Heath, John Kemp, Gary Lockerbie, Michael Skelton, David Skinns, Richard Walker, Gary Wolstenholme
- 2002 Yasin Ali, Jamie Elson, Graeme Clark, Lee Corfield, Richard Finch, Jon Lupton, Zane Scotland, David Skinns, Richard Walker, Oliver Wilson, Gary Wolstenholme
- 2001 Paul Bradshaw, Graeme Clark, Jamie Elson, Scott Godfrey, David Griffiths, Jon Lupton, Richard McEvoy, Zane Scotland, David Skinns, Richard Walker, Gary Wolstenholme
- 2000 David Dixon, Nick Dougherty, Jamie Elson, Richard Finch, David Griffiths, Richard McEvoy, Phil Rowe, David Ryles, Zane Scotland, Tom Whitehouse, Gary Wolstenholme
- 1999 Simon Dyson, David Griffiths, Max Harris, Ben Mason, Chris Rodgers, Mark Sanders, Mark Side, Graeme Storm, Aran Wainwright, John Wells, Gary Wolstenholme
- 1998 Luke Donald, Simon Dyson, Colin Edwards, Kenneth Ferrie, Max Harris, Mark Hilton, Ben Mason, Simon McCarthy, Phil Rowe, Mark Sanders, Gary Wolstenholme
- 1997 Matthew Blackey, Luke Donald, Robert Duck, Colin Edwards, Shaun Philipson, Michael Reynard, Justin Rose, Phil Rowe, Aran Wainwright, Karl Wallbank, Gary Wolstenholme
- 1996 Matthew Blackey, Warren Bladon, Matt Carver, Luke Donald, Peter Fenton, Denny Lucas, Michael Reynard, Karl Wallbank, Shaun P. Webster, Robert Wiggins, Gary Wolstenholme
- 1995 Matthew Blackey, Richard Bland, Gary Clark, Scott Drummond, Colin Edwards, Mark Foster, David Howell, Lee S. James, David Lynn, Steve Webster, Gary Wolstenholme
- 1994 Warren Bennett, Richard Bland, Colin Edwards, David Fisher, Mark Foster, Gary Harris, Jonathan Hodgson, David Howell, Lee S. James, Michael Welch, Gary Wolstenholme
- 1993 Warren Bennett, Colin Edwards, David Fisher, Ralph Hutt, Lee S. James, Paul Page, Iain Pyman, Matt Stanford, Michael Welch, Lee Westwood, Gary Wolstenholme
- 1992 Warren Bennett, Stuart Cage, Colin Edwards, Ian Garbutt, Ralph Hutt, Matt McGuire, Mark Pullan, Paul Streeter, Matt Stanford, Carl Watts, Gary Wolstenholme
- 1991 Colin Edwards, Ralph Hutt, Ian Garbutt, Nick Ludwell, Peter McEvoy, Mark Pullan, Andy Rogers, Matt Stanford, Carl Watts, Gary Winter, Gary Wolstenholme
- 1990 David Bathgate, James Cook, Bobby Eggo, Gary Evans, Ian Garbutt, Jim Payne, Andrew Sandywell, Liam White, Mark Wiggett, Ricky Willison, Gary Wolstenholme
- 1989 Craig Cassells, James Cook, Chris Davison, Bobby Eggo, Peter McEvoy, John Metcalfe, Tony Nash, Jim Payne, Ricky Willison, Roger Winchester, Gary Wolstenholme
- 1988 Russell Claydon, Bobby Eggo, Kenny Fairbairn, Andrew Hare, Peter McEvoy, Tony Nash, Steven Richardson, Carl Suneson, Kevin Weeks, Ricky Willison, Gary Wolstenholme
- 1987 Bob Bardsley, Paul Broadhurst, David Curry, Bobby Eggo, Wayne Henry, Peter McEvoy, Steven Richardson, Alex Robertson, Roger Roper, Kevin Weeks, Roger Winchester
- 1986 Steve Bottomley, Paul Broadhurst, David Curry, Bobby Eggo, Jonathan Langmead, Peter McEvoy, Richard Muscroft, Steven Richardson, Alex Robertson, Jeremy Robinson, Roger Roper
- 1985 Peter Baker, Mark Davis, Freddie George, David Gilford, John Hawksworth, Graham Homewood, Craig Laurence, Peter McEvoy, Roger Roper, Michael Walls, Roger Winchester
- 1984 David Curry, Mark Davis, Peter Deeble, David Gilford, Stephen Hamer, John Hawksworth, Craig Laurence, Peter McEvoy, Jonathan Plaxton, Roger Roper, Andrew Sherborne
- 1983 Charlie Banks, Peter Deeble, David Gilford, Stephen Hamer, Peter Hedges, Stephen Keppler, Craig Laurence, Peter McEvoy, Andrew Oldcorn, Jonathan Plaxton, Andrew Sherborne
- 1982 Richard Boxall, Paul Downes, Peter Hedges, Michael Kelley, Stephen Keppler, Malcolm Lewis, Andrew Oldcorn, David Ray, Andrew Sherborne, Andy Stubbs, Martin Thompson
- 1981 David Blakeman, Richard Boxall, Roger Chapman, Peter Deeble, Paul Downes, Geoffrey Godwin, Michael Kelley, Malcolm Lewis, Peter McEvoy, Michael Walls, Paul Way
- 1980 Richard Boxall, Andrew Carman, Roger Chapman, Peter Deeble, Paul Downes, Pat Garner, Geoffrey Godwin, Michael Kelley, Malcolm Lewis, Peter McEvoy, Michael Walls
- 1978 Paul Carrigill, Peter Deeble, John Davies, Paul Downes, Pat Garner, Geoffrey Godwin, Peter Hedges, Paul Hoad, Michael Kelley, Peter McEvoy, Chris Mitchell
- 1977 Peter Deeble, Paul Downes, Pat Garner, Geoffrey Godwin, Peter Hedges, Mike Inglis, Michael Kelley, Sandy Lyle, Peter McEvoy, Terry Shingler, Hogan Stott
- 1976 Gordon J. Brand, Peter Deeble, Paul Downes, Geoffrey Godwin, Peter Hedges, Michael Kelley, Sandy Lyle, Peter McEvoy, Chris Mitchell, Martin Poxon, Hogan Stott
- 1975 Peter Deeble, Richard Eyles, Nick Faldo, Peter Hedges, Mark James, Rodney James, Michael Kelley, Sandy Lyle, Geoff Marks, Chris Mitchell, Martin Poxon
- 1974 Harry Ashby, Michael Bonallack, Nigel Burch, John Davies, John Downie, Richard Eyles, Peter Hedges, Mark James, Rodney James, Michael Kelley, Geoff Marks
- 1973 Harry Ashby, Geoff Birtwell, Howard Clark, John Davies, Martin Foster, Peter Hedges, Trevor Homer, Michael King, Garry Logan, Carl Mason, Roger Revell
- 1972 Harry Ashby, Peter Berry, Michael Bonallack, John Davies, Rodney Foster, Trevor Homer, Michael King, David Marsh, Peter Moody, Roger Revell, Bill Smith
- 1971 Michael Bonallack, Gordon Clark, John Davies, Rodney Foster, Warren Humphreys, Michael King, Geoff Marks, David Marsh, Peter Moody, Ian Mosey, John Yeo
- 1970 Peter Benka, Geoff Birtwell, Michael Bonallack, Bruce Critchley, Rodney Foster, Peter Hedges, Warren Humphreys, Michael King, Geoff Marks, David Marsh, Donald Steel
- 1969 Peter Benka, Michael Bonallack, John Cook, Bruce Critchley, John Davies, Peter Dawson, Rodney Foster, Michael King, Geoff Marks, David Marsh, Peter Tupling
- 1968 Michael Attenborough, Peter Benka, Geoff Birtwell, Michael Bonallack, Gordon Clark, Rodney Foster, Gordon Hyde, David Kelley, Geoff Marks, David Marsh, Peter Oosterhuis
- 1967 Michael Attenborough, Peter Benka, Michael Bonallack, Michael Burgess, Gordon Clark, Bob Durrant, Rodney Foster, Gordon Hyde, Geoff Marks, David Moffat, Peter Oosterhuis
- 1966 Michael Attenborough, John Bloxham, Michael Bonallack, Gordon Clark, Rodney Foster, David Kelley, Michael Lunt, David Marsh, Dudley Millensted, Peter Oosterhuis, Peter Townsend
- 1965 Michael Bonallack, Michael Burgess, Clive Clark, Gordon Clark, David Kelley, Mike Lee, David Marsh, Dudley Millensted, David Moffat, Brian Stockdale, Peter Townsend
- 1964 Michael Bonallack, Michael Burgess, Martin Christmas, Clive Clark, Gordon Clark, Rodney Foster, Michael Lunt, David Marsh, Brian Stockdale, Alan Thirlwell
- 1963 Michael Bonallack, Michael Burgess, Martin Christmas, Rodney Foster, David Frame, Peter Green, Michael Lunt, Geoff Marks, David Moffat, David Palmer, Lionel Smith, Alan Thirlwell
- 1962 Michael Bonallack, Brian Chapman, Martin Christmas, Bruce Critchley, David Frame, Peter Green, Alex Holmes, Gordon Huddy, Keith Warren, Michael Lunt, David Palmer, Alan Slater
- 1961 Michael Bonallack, Ian Caldwell, Brian Chapman, Martin Christmas, Gordon Clark, George Evans, David Frame, Peter Green, Gordon Huddy, David Moffat, David Neech
- 1960 Sam Brough, Michael Bonallack, Martin Christmas, David Frame, Gordon Huddy, Michael Lunt, David Marsh, David Moffat, Doug Sewell, Alec Shepperson, Guy Wolstenholme
- 1959 Sam Brough, Michael Bonallack, Ian Caldwell, David Frame, Michael Lunt, David Marsh, David Moffat, Doug Sewell, Alec Shepperson, Guy Wolstenholme
- 1958 Michael Bonallack, Ian Caldwell, Stan Fox, David Frame, Michael Lunt, David Marsh, Doug Sewell, Alec Shepperson, Alan Thirlwell, Guy Wolstenholme
- 1957 Michael Bonallack, Ian Caldwell, Michael Lunt, David Marsh, Arthur Perowne, Doug Sewell, Alec Shepperson, Tony Slark, Alan Thirlwell, Guy Wolstenholme
- 1956 John Beharrell, Ian Caldwell, Stan Fox, Michael Lunt, David Marsh, Doug Sewell, Alec Shepperson, Keith Tate, Alan Thirlwell, Guy Wolstenholme
- 1955 Sam Brough, Ian Caldwell, Leonard Crawley, Jackie Jones, Gerald Micklem, Bunny Millward, Arthur Perowne, Philip Scrutton, Alan Slater, Keith Tate, Alan Thirlwell, Guy Wolstenholme
- 1954 Ian Caldwell, Leonard Crawley, Jackie Jones, Gerald Micklem, Bunny Millward, Arthur Perowne, Charlie Stowe, Keith Tate, Alan Thirlwell, Ronnie White
- 1953 Ian Caldwell, John Langley, Gerald Micklem, Bunny Millward, Arthur Perowne, Dixon Rawlinson, Geoffrey Roberts, Harley Roberts, Ken Thom, Ronnie White, Guy Wolstenholme
- 1952 Sam Brough, Ian Caldwell, Jackie Jones, John Langley, Gerald Micklem, Bunny Millward, Ian Patey, Mike Pearson, Dixon Rawlinson, Alan Thirlwell, Alan Turner
- 1951 Harry Bennett, Edward Bromley-Davenport, Ian Caldwell, Jackie Jones, John Langley, Gerald Micklem, Jack Payne, Mike Pearson, Arthur Perowne, Geoffrey Roberts, Alan Thirlwell
- 1950 Ian Caldwell, Jackie Jones, John Langley, Malcolm Lee, Gerald Micklem, Bunny Millward, Jack Payne, Arthur Perowne, Dixon Rawlinson, Philip Scrutton, Steve Tredinnick
- 1949 Harry Bennett, Leonard Crawley, Jackie Jones, Laddie Lucas, Gerald Micklem, Reg Pattinson, Arthur Perowne, Dixon Rawlinson, Charlie Stowe, Ken Thom, Ronnie White
- 1948 Harry Bennett, Leonard Crawley, Alan Helm, Jackie Jones, Laddie Lucas, Gerald Micklem, Arthur Perowne, Harley Roberts, Jimmy Rothwell, Charlie Stowe, Ken Thom, Ronnie White
- 1947 Dickie Bell, Harry Bentley, Leonard Crawley, Gerald Micklem, Frank Pennink, Arthur Perowne, Harley Roberts, Jimmy Rothwell, Charlie Stowe, Duncan Sutherland, Ken Thom, Ronnie White, Bill Wise
- 1938 Sidney Banks, Harry Bentley, Edward Bromley-Davenport, Leonard Crawley, Kenneth Frazier, Joe Gent, John Lyon, Dennis Martin, Frank Pennink, Kenneth Scott, Charlie Stowe, Tom Thirsk, Cyril Tolley
- 1937 Arnold Bentley, Harry Bentley, Leonard Crawley, Alec Hill, John Lyon, Frank Pennink, Kenneth Scott, Charlie Stowe, Tom Thirsk, Guy Thompson, Charles Timmis, Cyril Tolley
- 1936 Arnold Bentley, Harry Bentley, Leonard Crawley, Francis Francis, Alec Hill, Laddie Lucas, Philip Risdon, Eustace Storey, Charlie Stowe, Tom Thirsk, Charles Timmis, Cyril Tolley
- 1935 Harry Bentley, Eric Fiddian, Rex Hartley, Stanley Lunt, Philip Risdon, Charlie Stowe, Tom Thirsk, Guy Thompson, William Tweddell, Roy Walton, John Woollam, John Zacharias
- 1934 Sidney Banks, Roger Bayliss, Harry Bentley, Dale Bourn, Leonard Crawley, Eric Fiddian, Rex Hartley, Stanley Lunt, James Snowden, Tom Thirsk, Roy Walton, John Woollam
- 1933 Roger Bayliss, John Beck, Harry Bentley, Dale Bourn, Leonard Crawley, Eric Fiddian, Norman Fogg, Lister Hartley, Rex Hartley, Stanley Lunt, Tom Thirsk, Ivor Thomas, John Woollam
- 1932 Harry Bentley, Thomas Bowman, Stewart Bradshaw, Leonard Crawley, Eric Fiddian, Cyril Gray, Lister Hartley, Stanley Lunt, Allan Newey, Reginald Straker, Edward Tipple

=== Ireland ===
- 2021 Marc Boucher, Alan Fahy, Hugh Foley, T. J. Ford, Alex Maguire, Matt McClean, Jack McDonnell, Robert Moran, Liam Nolan, Peter O'Keeffe, Caolan Rafferty
- 2019 Rob Brazill, Colm Campbell, Keith Egan, Sean Flanagan, Matthew McClean, Tom McKibbin, Tiarnán McLarnon, Ronan Mullarney, Conor Purcell, Caolan Rafferty, James Sugrue
- 2018 Robbie Cannon, Robin Dawson, Alex Gleeson, Tiarnan McLarnon, Ronan Mullarney, Peter O'Keeffe, Mark Power, Conor Purcell, Colin Rafferty, James Sugrue, Jonathan Yates
- 2017 Colm Campbell, Robin Dawson, Colin Fairweather, John-Ross Galbraith, Alex Gleeson, Rowan Lester, Paul McBride, Peter O'Keeffe, Conor O'Rourke, Conor Purcell, Colin Rafferty
- 2016 Colm Campbell, Robin Dawson, Sean Flanagan, John-Ross Galbraith, Alex Gleeson, Stuart Grehan, Rowan Lester, Paul McBride, Tiarnan McLarnon, Conor O'Rourke, Conor Purcell
- 2015 Colm Campbell, Robin Dawson, Colin Fairweather, John-Ross Galbraith, Alex Gleeson, Stuart Grehan, Jack Hume, Rowan Lester, Paul McBride, Dermot McElroy, Gavin Moynihan
- 2014 Richard Bridges, Colm Campbell, Robin Dawson, Paul Dunne, Jack Hume, Gary Hurley, Dermot McElroy, Gavin Moynihan, John-Ross Galbraith, Chris Selfridge, Cormac Sharvin
- 2013 Brian Casey, Paul Dunne, Jack Hume, Gary Hurley, Dermot McElroy, Rory McNamara, Gavin Moynihan, Kevin Phelan, Chris Selfridge, Cormac Sharvin, Reeve Whitson
- 2012 Harry Diamond, Alan Dunbar, Nicky Grant, Gary Hurley, Dermot McElroy, Rory McNamara, Gavin Moynihan, Richard O'Donovan, Kevin Phelan, Chris Selfridge, Reeve Whitson
- 2011 Eoin Arthurs, Paul Cutler, Alan Dunbar, Paul Dunne, Niall Gorey, Aaron Kearney, Eddie McCormack, Gary McDermott, Dermot McElroy, Richard O'Donovan, Kevin Phelan
- 2010 Barry Anderson, Paul Cutler, Connor Doran, Alan Dunbar, Paul Dunne, Luke Lennox, Rory Leonard, Dara Lernihan, Eddie McCormack, Pat Murray, Kevin Phelan
- 2009 Robert Cannon, Cian Curley, Paul Cutler, Connor Doran, Alan Dunbar, Niall Kearney, Dara Lernihan, Pat Murray, Kelan McDonagh, Paul O'Kane, Simon Ward
- 2008 Eoin Arthurs, Jonathan Caldwell, Cian Curley, Paul Cutler, Alan Dunbar, Niall Kearney, Dara Lernihan, Shane Lowry, Paul O'Hanlon, Cathal O'Malley, Simon Ward

=== Scotland ===
- 2021 George Burns, Angus Carrick, Matthew Clark, Stuart Easton, Rory Franssen, Darren Howie, Lewis Irvine, Ruben Lindsay, Andrew Ni, Connor Wilson, James Wilson
- 2019 George Burns, Kieran Cantley, Matthew Clark, Stuart Easton, Darren Howie, Lewis Irvine, Ryan Lumsden, Eric McIntosh, Euan McIntosh, Connor McKinney, James Wilson
- 2018 Kieran Cantley, Matthew Clark, Stuart Easton, Calum Fyfe, Jim Johnston, Ryan Lumsden, Euan McKintosh, Stephen Roger, Euan Walker, James Wilson, Jeff Wright
- 2017 Matthew Clark, Rory Franssen, Craig Howie, Liam Johnston, Sam Locke, Ryan Lumsden, Chris Maclean, Craig Ross, Sandy Scott, Jamie Stewart, Euan Walker
- 2016 Matthew Clark, George Duncan, Calum Fyfe, Craig Howie, Barry Hume, Liam Johnston, Euan McIntosh, Graeme Robertson, Craig Ross, Jamie Savage, Sandy Scott
- 2015 Ryan Campbell, Matthew Clark, Craig Howie, Barry Hume, Robert MacIntyre, Greig Marchbank, Jack McDonald, Graeme Robertson, Craig Ross, Connor Syme, Daniel Young
- 2014 Matthew Clark, Adam Dunton, Scott Gibson, Greig Marchbank, Jack McDonald, Chris Robb, Graeme Robertson, Craig Ross, James Ross, Jamie Savage, Daniel Young
- 2013 Scott Borrowman, Matthew Clark, Scott Crichton, Alexander Culverwell, Grant Forrest, Jack McDonald, Bradley Neil, Graeme Robertson, James Ross, Ewan Scott, Daniel Young
- 2012 Ross Bell, Scott Borrowman, Matthew Clark, Paul Ferrier, Grant Forrest, Jack McDonald, Fraser McKenna, Graeme Robertson, Paul Shields, Brian Soutar, James White
- 2011 James Byrne, Scott Gibson, Ross Kellett, David Law, Philip McLean, Kris Nicol, Greg Paterson, Graeme Robertson, Paul Shields, Michael Stewart, James White
- 2010 James Byrne, Allyn Dick, Jordan Findlay, Ross Kellett, Peter Latimer, Philip McLean, Kris Nicol, Greg Paterson, Brian Soutar, Michael Stewart, James White
- 2009 Wallace Booth, James Byrne, Glenn Campbell, Gavin Dear, Ross Kellett, David Law, Steven McEwan, Michael Stewart, Keir McNicoll, Paul O'Hara, James White
- 2008 Wallace Booth, Glenn Campbell, Gavin Dear, Scott Henry, Ross Kellett, Callum Macaulay, Steven McEwan, Keir McNicoll, Paul O'Hara, Michael Stewart, Gordon Yates

=== Wales ===
- 2021 James Ashfield, Tomi Bowen, Ben Chamberlain, Jacob Davies, Aled Greville, Kieron Harman, Luke Harries, Tim Harry, Tom Matthews, Craig Melding, Matt Roberts
- 2019 George Bryant, Ben Chamberlain, Jacob Davies, Rhys Evans, Tom Froom, Jake Hapgood, Kieron Harman, Connor Jones, Matt Roberts, Lewys Sanges, Gaelan Trew
- 2018 Oliver Brown, Ben Chamberlain, Archie Davies, Jacob Davies, Jake Hapgood, Kieron Harman, Patrick Mullins, Matt Roberts, Lewys Sanges, Gaelan Trew, Tom Williams
- 2017 Ben Chamberlain, Jack Davidson, Joshua Davies, Owen Edwards, Evan Griffith, Jake Hapgood, Matthew Harris, Tim Harry, Llewellyn Matthews, Lewys Sanges, Tom Williams
- 2016 Ben Chamberlain, Jack Davidson, Joshua Davies, Owen Edwards, Zach Galliford, Evan Griffith, Kyle Harman, Lee Jones, Llewellyn Matthews, Patrick Mullins, Tom Williams
- 2015 David Boote, Jack Davidson, Joshua Davies, Owen Edwards, Zach Galliford, Evan Griffith, Tim Harry, Mike Hearne, Richard James, Ben Westgate, Tom Williams
- 2014 David Boote, Jack Bush, Ryan Davies, Owen Edwards, Zach Galliford, Evan Griffith, Mike Hearne, Richard James, Lee Jones, Matt Moseley, Ben Westgate
- 2013 David Boote, Jack Bush, Zach Galliford, Mike Hearne, Richard James, Alistair Jones, Lee Jones, Craig Melding, Matthew Moseley, Jason Shufflebotham, Ben Westgate
- 2012 Jonathan Bale, Richard Bentham, David Boote, James Frazer, Richard James, Geraint Jones, William Jones, Rhys Pugh, Jason Shufflebotham, Luke Thomas, Ben Westgate
- 2011 Richard Bentham, David Boote, Rhys Enoch, Oliver Farr, James Frazer, Richard Hooper, Alastair Jones, Rhys Pugh, Jason Shufflebotham, Joe Vickery, Ben Westgate
- 2010 Jonathan Bale, Nigel Edwards, Rhys Enoch, Oliver Farr, James Frazer, Nick James, Richard James, Alastair Jones, Chris Nugent, Rhys Pugh, Joe Vickery
- 2009 Nigel Edwards, Rhys Enoch, Oliver Farr, James Frazer, Richard Hooper, Alistair Jones, Rhys Pugh, Adam Runcie, Luke Thomas, Joe Vickery, Ben Westgate
- 2008 Nigel Edwards, Ben Enoch, Rhys Enoch, Craig Evans, Oliver Farr, James Frazer, Zac Gould, Jamie Howie, Adam Runcie, Joe Vickery, Ben Westgate
