= Alec Shepperson =

English amateur golfer (born 1936)

Personal information
- Full name: Alec Edward Shepperson
- Nationality: England
- Born: April 1936 (age 90) Mansfield, Nottinghamshire, England

Career
- Sport: Golf
- Status: Amateur

Best results in major championships
- Masters Tournament: DNP
- PGA Championship: DNP
- U.S. Open: DNP
- The Open Championship: CUT: 1956, 1957

Alec Edward Shepperson (born April 1936) is an English amateur golfer. He played in the 1957 and 1959 Walker Cup matches.

== Golf career ==
Shepperson was a successful boy golfer. In 1951 he represented England against Scotland at Prestwick. In the subsequent Boys Amateur Championship he reached the quarter-finals before losing at the 19th hole to the eventual winner, Neville Dunn. The following year at Formby he reached the final of the Boys Championship. Playing Michael Bonallack he was 3 down with 5 holes to play, levelled the match but then lost at the 37th hole after Bonallack holed a 16-yard putt. In 1953 at Dunbar he reached the final for the second successive year. Playing Tom Booth, Shepperson was 5 up after 9 holes and eventually won 6 & 4.

Shepperson went to Oxford in 1954 and gained his blue in 1955, 1956 and 1957. He won the French International Boys Championship in 1955, beating Niels Thygesen 6 & 5 in the final. In early 1957 he became the youngest winner of President's Putter, beating Gerald Micklem 3 & 2 in the final.

From 1956 Shepperson was a regular selection for international matches. As well as playing for England, he represented the British Isles against the Rest of Europe in 1956, 1958 and 1960, a match that later became the St Andrews Trophy, and for Great Britain & Ireland against the United States in the Walker Cup in 1957 and 1959. He also represented the amateurs in the Amateurs–Professionals Match annually from 1956 to 1960. In the 1957 Walker Cup he played with Guy Wolstenholme in the foursomes, halving his match, but was not selected for the singles. In 1959 he played with Michael Lunt in the foursomes but lost 2 & 1 to Jack Nicklaus and Ward Wettlaufer. He played Tommy Aaron in the singles, a future Masters champion. All square after 18 holes, Shepperson was 4 down with 9 holes to play after a poor front nine. However, from the 10th hole he scored 4-3-4-3-4-4-3-4, winning 6 of the 8 holes to win the match 2 & 1.

Shepperson was runner-up in the 1958 Brabazon Trophy at Royal Birkdale, 3 strokes behind Arthur Perowne. In 1960 he tried to qualify for centenary Open Championship. Having failed to qualify he played in the Turnberry Trophy instead. In the first round on the Ailsa course he was out in 31 and completed the round in a course-record 65 to lead by 7 strokes, eventually winning the event by 5 strokes. From about 1960 he played less golf although he was still good enough to be competitive when he did play. In 1962 he lost in a playoff for the Brabazon Trophy. He had tied with Alan Slater with a score of 290 but lost the 18-hole playoff by 3 strokes. He also reached semi-final of the 1964 English Amateur at Notts Golf Club.

== Personal life ==
Shepperson learnt his golf at Coxmoor Golf Club where his parents were members. He studied law at Christ College, Oxford University and later became a solicitor in Mansfield.

== Amateur wins ==
- 1953 Boys Amateur Championship
- 1955 Nottinghamshire Open Championship, French International Boys Championship
- 1957 President's Putter
- 1958 Nottinghamshire Open Championship
- 1960 Turnberry Trophy

== Results in major championships ==
Tournament	1956	1957
The Open Championship	CUT	CUT

Note: Shepperson only played in The Open Championship.
CUT = missed the half-way cut

== Team appearances ==
- Walker Cup (representing Great Britain & Ireland): 1957, 1959
- Amateurs–Professionals Match (representing the Amateurs): 1956, 1957, 1958 (winners), 1959, 1960
- St Andrews Trophy (representing Great Britain & Ireland): 1956 (winners), 1958 (winners), 1960 (winners)
