= Brabazon Trophy =

Tournament information
- Location: England
- Established: 1947
- Course: Notts Golf Club (2024)
- Organised by: England Golf
- Format: Stroke play

Tournament record score
- Aggregate: 270 Christiaan Maas (2022)

Current champion
- Tom Osborne

The English Men's Open Amateur Stroke Play Championship for the Brabazon Trophy is the national amateur stroke play golf championship in England (although entry is open to overseas golfers). It has been played annually since 1947 and is organised by England Golf.

The format is 72 hole stroke play contested over four days. After 36 holes the leading 60 competitors and ties play a further 36 holes over the final two days.

== History ==
In March 1938, John Moore-Brabazon was elected president of the English Golf Union. Early in 1939 a new EGU competition was announced, with a trophy presented by Moore-Brabazon. The event was to be a 72-hole strokeplay tournament to be played at Royal Liverpool from 4 to 6 October. Because of the start of World War II the event was cancelled. The idea was revived after the war and was first played in 1947 at Royal Birkdale Golf Club, called the English Golf Union president's trophy. It was won by Duncan Sutherland following an 18-hole playoff.

Before the 1948 event, the official name of the tournament was changed to the Brabazon Trophy, named after Moore-Brabazon, who had become Lord Brabazon in 1942. It was played at Royal Lytham and was won by Charlie Stowe, 7 strokes ahead of Gerald Micklem.

The first few events were, like the English Amateur, restricted to English golfers, but from 1951 it became an open event, amateur golfers from any part of the world being able to play.

Initially an 18-hole playoff was used if two or more players were tied after the 72 holes. However, after the 1963 event, playoffs were abandoned and the trophy was shared. The last tie was in 2007. Ties are now decided by a sudden-death playoff.

The first player to successfully defend the trophy was Ronnie White in 1950 and 1951, a feat which has been matched a further five times, Philip Scrutton (1954–55), Michael Bonallack (outright in 1968 and tied in 1969), Rodney Foster (tied 1969 and outright 1970), Gary Evans (tied 1990–91) and Neil Raymond (2011–12).

The tournament has received an increasingly international field over time, the first winner from outside of the British Isles was Neville Sundelson of South Africa in 1974. The tournament has subsequently been won (or tied) by international competitors on eight occasions.

The record for the most wins by a single individual is four (including one tie) held by Sir Michael Bonallack and won between 1964 and 1971. The tournament has twice been won by players who would go on to win a men's major championship, Sandy Lyle who won in 1977 would go on to win The Open Championship and the Masters Tournament and Charl Schwartzel who won in 2002 would go on to win the Masters.

The championship has never been played on the same course in consecutive years, however many of the host courses have hosted the tournament on multiple occasions with Royal Birkdale Golf Club, Royal Liverpool Golf Club, Moortown Golf Club and Hunstanton Golf Club having been used to host the competition on five occasions each.

Four golfers have won both the Brabazon Trophy and the Carris Trophy in the same year. The Carris Trophy is the equivalent event for under-18s. Patrick Hine (1949), Sandy Lyle (1975) and Peter Baker (1985) were each 17 years old when they won the Brabazon Trophy, while Ben Schmidt was 16 years old when he won both in 2019. Other under-18 winners of the Brabazon Trophy have been Ronan Rafferty, who was 16 when he was a joint-winner in 1980, and Charl Schwartzel who was 17 when he won in 2002. The George Henriques Salver is awarded to the leading player from Great Britain and Ireland under the age of 20. Henriques was president of the EGU in 1951. After his death in 1961 the salver was donated by his widow and first awarded in 1962.

== Winners ==
Year	Winner(s)	Score	Margin of victory	Runner(s)-up	Venue	Ref.
2026	(England) Tom Osborne	268	2 strokes	(England) Eliot Baker	Moortown	
2025	(Italy) Biagio Andrea Gagliardi	276	2 strokes	(England) Freddie Turnell	Hankley Common	
2024	(Scotland) Gregor Graham	185 (Note: Event reduced to 48 holes because of adverse weather.)	1 stroke	(England) Daniel Hayes (Sweden) Wilhelm Ryding	Holinwell	
2023	(Republic of Ireland) Liam Nolan	277	Playoff	(England) Zach Little	Sunningdale	
2022	(South Africa) Christiaan Maas	270	5 strokes	(England) Arron Edwards-Hill	Saunton	
2021	(England) Sam Bairstow	273	2 strokes	(England) Zachary Chegwidden	Ganton	
2020	(France) David Ravetto	274	Playoff (Note: Ravetto won at the second extra hole. Power dropped out after the first extra hole.)	(Denmark) Christoffer Bring (Republic of Ireland) Mark Power	Sherwood Forest	
2019	(England) Ben Schmidt	271	5 strokes	(England) Harry Hall	Alwoodley	
2018	(England) Nick Poppleton	272	Playoff (Note: Poppleton beat Nienaber at the second extra hole.)	(South Africa) Wilco Nienaber	Frilford Heath	
2017	(South Africa) Kyle McClatchie	282	1 stroke	(England) Jake Burnage (England) Jack Singh Brar (Scotland) Jamie Stewart	Woodhall Spa	
2016	(England) Jamie Bower	276	1 stroke	(Australia) Cameron Davis	London	
2015	(Northern Ireland) Cormac Sharvin	281	1 stroke	(Republic of Ireland) Gavin Moynihan	Hollinwell	
2014	(England) Ben Stow	278	1 stroke	(England) Ashley Chesters (England) Ryan Evans	Seaton Carew	
2013	(England) Jordan Smith	286	4 strokes	(Republic of Ireland) Brian Casey	Formby	
2012	(England) Neil Raymond	287	2 strokes	(Republic of Ireland) Kevin Phelan	Walton Heath	
2011	(England) Neil Raymond	287	1 stroke	(Northern Ireland) Alan Dunbar (England) Andy Sullivan	Burnham & Berrow	
2010	(England) Darren Wright	285	4 strokes	(England) Simon Richardson	Royal Liverpool	
2009	(Republic of Ireland) Niall Kearney	208 (Note: Event reduced to 54 holes because of adverse weather.)	5 strokes	(England) Liam Burns	Moortown	
2008	(England) Steven Uzzell	197	4 strokes	(France) Benjamin Hébert	Trevose	
2007	(France) Romain Bechu (England) Jamie Moul	281	Tied	–	Forest of Arden	
2006	(England) Robert Dinwiddie	282	3 strokes	(England) Ross McGowan	Ganton	
2005	(Scotland) Lloyd Saltman	278	6 strokes	(England) James Crampton (England) Oliver Fisher	The Oxfordshire	
2004	(England) Matthew Richardson	279	1 stroke	(England) Sam Osborne	West Lancashire	
2003	(England) Jon Lupton	287	2 strokes	(Scotland) Jack Doherty	Hunstanton	
2002	(South Africa) Charl Schwartzel	282	2 strokes	(Republic of Ireland) Colm Moriarty	Royal Cinque Ports	
2001	(England) Richard Walker	280	1 stroke	(Scotland) Steven O'Hara	Royal Birkdale	
2000	(Germany) Jochen Lupprian	284	2 strokes	(Wales) Jamie Donaldson	Woodhall Spa	
1999	(England) Mark Side	279	1 stroke	(Scotland) Mark Loftus (England) Graeme Storm	Moortown	
1998	(Sweden) Peter Hanson	287	1 stroke	(Republic of Ireland) Bryan Omelia	Formby	
1997	(Wales) David Park	271	4 strokes	(Australia) Geoff Ogilvy	Saunton	
1996	(England) Peter Fenton	297	8 strokes	(Australia) Stephen Allan (England) Blake Toone	Royal St George's	
1995	(England) Colin Edwards (England) Mark Foster	283	Tied	–	Hillside	
1994	(England) Gary Harris	280	6 strokes	(England) Warren Bennett	Little Aston	
1993	(England) David Fisher	277	1 stroke	(New Zealand) Phil Tataurangi	Stoneham	
1992	(Spain) Ignacio Garrido	280	9 strokes	(England) Matt McGuire	Hollinwell	
1991	(England) Gary Evans (England) Mark Pullan	284	Tied	–	Hunstanton	
1990	(England) Gary Evans (France) Olivier Edmond	287	Tied	–	Burnham & Berrow	
1989	(South Africa) Craig Rivett (Wales) Neil Roderick	293	Tied	–	Royal Liverpool	
1988	(England) Bobby Eggo	289	3 strokes	(England) Tony Nash	Saunton	
1987	(England) Jeremy Robinson	287	1 stroke	(England) Bob Bardsley	Ganton	
1986	(South Africa) Richard Kaplan	286	4 strokes	(England) Stephen Hamer	Sunningdale	
1985	(England) Peter Baker (England) Roger Roper	296	Tied	–	Seaton Carew	
1984	(England) Mark Davis	286	3 strokes	(England) Stephen East	Royal Cinque Ports	
1983	(England) Charlie Banks	294	1 stroke	(England) Stephen Keppler	Hollinwell	
1982	(England) Paul Downes	299	1 stroke	(England) David Gilford (England) Stephen Keppler	Woburn	
1981	(England) Paul Way	292	3 strokes	(England) Richard Boxall	Hillside	
1980	(England) Peter McEvoy (Northern Ireland) Ronan Rafferty	293	Tied	–	Hunstanton	
1979	(Northern Ireland) David Long	291	1 stroke	(England) Ian Bradshaw (England) Brian Marchbank	Little Aston	
1978	(Scotland) Gordon Brand Jnr	289	5 strokes	(England) Peter McEvoy	Woodhall Spa	
1977	(Scotland) Sandy Lyle	293	7 strokes	(England) John Davies	Royal Liverpool	
1976	(England) Peter Hedges	294	1 stroke	(England) Gordon J. Brand	Saunton	
1975	(Scotland) Sandy Lyle	298	2 strokes	(England) Geoff Marks	Hollinwell	
1974	(South Africa) Neville Sundelson	291	1 stroke	(England) Nigel Burch	Moortown	
1973	(England) Roger Revell	294	2 strokes	(England) Geoff Marks (England) Stephen Rooke	Hunstanton	
1972	(England) Peter Moody	296	1 stroke	(England) Ian Mosey	Royal Liverpool	
1971	(England) Michael Bonallack	294	2 strokes	(Scotland) Scott Macdonald	Hillside	
1970	(England) Rodney Foster	287	2 strokes	(Scotland) Scott Macdonald	Little Aston	
1969	(England) Michael Bonallack (England) Rodney Foster	290	Tied	–	Moortown	
1968	(England) Michael Bonallack	210	5 strokes	(Republic of Ireland) Bill McCrea	Walton Heath	
1967	(Scotland) Ronnie Shade	299	4 strokes	(England) Michael Bonallack	Saunton	
1966	(England) Peter Townsend	282	7 strokes	(England) Michael Bonallack (South Africa) Bobby Cole (Scotland) Ronnie Shade	Hunstanton	
1965	(England) Michael Burgess (England) Clive Clark (England) Dudley Millensted	289	Tied	–	Formby	
1964	(England) Michael Bonallack	290	4 strokes	(England) Michael Burgess (England) Brian Stockdale (England) Alan Thirlwell	Royal Cinque Ports	
1963	(Scotland) Ronnie Shade	306	Playoff (Note: In the 18-hole playoff Shade scored 75, Green 77.)	(England) Peter Green	Royal Birkdale	
1962	(England) Alan Slater	290	Playoff (Note: In the 18-hole playoff Slater scored 71, Shepperson 74.)	(England) Alec Shepperson	Woodhall Spa	
1961	(Scotland) Ronnie Shade	284	8 strokes	(England) Michael Lunt	Royal Liverpool	
1960	(England) Guy Wolstenholme	286	Playoff (Note: In the 18-hole playoff Wolstenholme scored 72, Christmas 77.)	(England) Martin Christmas	Ganton	
1959	(England) Doug Sewell	300	Playoff (Note: In the 18-hole playoff Sewell scored 78, Bonallack 79.)	(England) Michael Bonallack	Hollinwell	
1958	(England) Arthur Perowne	289	3 strokes	(England) Alec Shepperson	Royal Birkdale	
1957	(England) Doug Sewell	287	8 strokes	(England) Tony Slark	Moortown	
1956	(England) Stan Fox	292	4 strokes	(England) Philip Scrutton	Burnham & Berrow	
1955	(England) Philip Scrutton	283	3 strokes	(England) Mike Pearson (England) Guy Wolstenholme	Northumberland	
1954	(England) Philip Scrutton	302	1 stroke	(England) Jackie Jones (England) Mike Pearson	Woodhall Spa	
1953	(England) Charlie Stowe	283	9 strokes	(England) Guy Wolstenholme	Sunningdale	
1952	(England) Philip Scrutton	290	1 stroke	(Scotland) Alex Kyle	Ganton	
1951	(England) Ronnie White	293	4 strokes	(England) Jack Payne	Formby	
1950	(England) Ronnie White	294	8 strokes	(England) Philip Scrutton	Royal Birkdale	
1949	(England) Patrick Hine	287	8 strokes	(England) Bunny Millward	Stoneham	
1948	(England) Charlie Stowe	299	7 strokes	(England) Gerald Micklem	Royal Lytham & St Annes	
1947	(England) Duncan Sutherland	306	Playoff (Note: In the 18-hole playoff Sutherland scored 85, Rothwell 86.)	(England) Jimmy Rothwell	Royal Birkdale	

=== Multiple winners ===
The following golfers have won (or tied) the Brabazon Trophy on more than one occasion

Golfer	Total	Years
(England) Michael Bonallack	4	1964, 1968, 1969 (tied), 1971
(England) Philip Scrutton	3	1952, 1954, 1955
(Scotland) Ronnie Shade	3	1961, 1963, 1967
(England) Ronnie White	2	1950, 1951
(England) Charlie Stowe	2	1948, 1953
(England) Doug Sewell	2	1957, 1959
(England) Rodney Foster	2	1969 (tied), 1970
(Scotland) Sandy Lyle	2	1975, 1977
(England) Gary Evans	2	1990 (tied), 1991 (tied)
(England) Neil Raymond	2	2011, 2012

== Venues by course ==
The championship has been hosted at several golf courses on multiple occasions

Venue	Times hosted	Years hosted
Notts Golf Club (Hollinwell)	6	1959, 1975, 1983, 1992, 2015, 2024
Royal Birkdale Golf Club	5	1947, 1950, 1958, 1963, 2001
Moortown Golf Club	5	1957, 1969, 1974, 1999, 2009
Royal Liverpool Golf Club	5	1961, 1972, 1977, 1989, 2010
Hunstanton Golf Club	5	1966, 1973, 1980, 1991, 2003
Woodhall Spa Golf Club	5	1954, 1962, 1978, 2000, 2017
Ganton Golf Club	5	1952, 1960, 1987, 2006, 2021
Saunton Golf Club	5	1967, 1976, 1988, 1997, 2022
Formby Golf Club	4	1951, 1965, 1998, 2013
Sunningdale Golf Club	3	1953, 1986, 2023
Burnham & Berrow Golf Club	3	1956, 1990, 2011
Royal Cinque Ports Golf Club	3	1964, 1984, 2002
Little Aston Golf Club	3	1970, 1979, 1994
Hillside Golf Club	3	1971, 1981, 1995
Seaton Carew Golf Club	2	1985, 2014
Stoneham Golf Club	2	1949, 1993
Walton Heath Golf Club	2	1968, 2012
Royal Lytham & St Annes Golf Club	1	1948
Northumberland Golf Club	1	1955
Woburn Golf and Country Club	1	1982
Royal St George's Golf Club	1	1996
West Lancashire Golf Club	1	2004
The Oxfordshire Golf Club	1	2005
Forest of Arden Hotel & Country Club	1	2007
Trevose Golf & Country Club	1	2008
London Golf Club	1	2016
Frilford Heath Golf Club	1	2018
Alwoodley Golf Club	1	2019
Sherwood Forest Golf Club	1	2020

== See also ==
- English Amateur
