= John Scholfield (rugby union) =

England international rugby union player

- Full name: John Arthur Scholfield
- Born: 6 April 1888 Lytham St Annes, England
- Died: 14 September 1967 (aged 79) Barnstaple, England
- School: Sedbergh School
- University: University of Cambridge

Rugby union career
- Position: Centre
International career
| Years | Team | Apps | (Points) |
| 1911 | England | 1 | (3) |

John Arthur Scholfield (6 April 1888 – 14 September 1967) was an English international rugby union player.

Scholfield was born in Lytham St Annes, Lancashire, and attended Sedbergh School.

A Cambridge rugby blue, Scholfield played locally for the Preston Grasshoppers and was capped for England as a centre three-quarter against Wales at Swansea in 1911.

Scholfield was also a Lancashire Second XI cricketer and competed at the English Amateur Golf Championships, as did two brothers.

In World War I, Scholfield served with the 6/7th Battalions of the Manchester Regiment and was held as a prisoner of war for the last nine months of the conflict.

== See also ==
- List of England national rugby union players
