= Harry Ashby (golfer) =

English professional golfer

Harry Ashby (7 May 1946 – 24 April 2010) was an English professional golfer. He won the English Amateur in 1972 and 1973.

Ashby was born in Consett, County Durham. After being English Amateur champion for two years in succession, he turned professional and played on the European Tour from 1974 to 1977, after which time he became a club professional.

== Team appearances ==
Amateur

- St Andrews Trophy (representing Great Britain & Ireland): 1974
- Men's Home Internationals (representing England): 1972 (joint winners), 1973 (winners), 1974 (winners)
