= Amateurs–Professionals Match =

Tournament information
- Established: 1956
- Format: Team match play
- Month played: August
- Final year: 1960

Final champion
- Professionals

The Amateurs–Professionals Match was an annual men's team golf competition between teams of golfers from Great Britain and Ireland representing amateurs and professionals. It was played from 1956 to 1960. The Professionals won four of the five contests but the Amateurs won in 1958. The match was organised by the R&A and the PGA.

== History ==
Two matches between teams of amateurs and professionals had been played in late 1954 and early 1955. The first was a match between the British 1954 Joy Cup team and a team of amateurs in November 1954. The professionals won the foursomes 3–2 but the singles were washed out. The second was a match between the British 1955 Walker Cup team and a team of professionals led by Henry Cotton played in March 1955. The professionals won 10½–4½. In both these matches the professionals conceded a 2-hole start. The idea of an official annual match emerged out of these earlier matches.

The amateurs recorded their only win in 1958. Trailing 3–2 after the foursomes they won 7 of the 10 singles match and halved another. Of the professionals, only Dai Rees and Peter Alliss won their matches while Harry Weetman got a half against Guy Wolstenholme.

== Format ==
The match was contested over two days with 36-hole foursomes on the first day and 36-hole singles matches on the second day. There were 5 foursomes and 10 singles. Matches were played on level terms.

== Results ==
Year	Dates	Venue	Winners	Score	Ref
1956	4–5 August	Royal Mid-Surrey Golf Club	Professionals	10–5	
1957	2–3 August	Lindrick Golf Club	Professionals	9–6	
1958	8–9 August	Turnberry, Ailsa Course	Amateurs	9½–5½	
1959	7–8 August	Southport and Ainsdale Golf Club	Professionals	9½–5½	
1960	5–6 August	Prestwick Golf Club	Professionals	11–4	

== Appearances ==
The following are those who played in at least one of the five matches.

=== Amateurs ===
- (England) John Beharrell 1956
- (Scotland) David Blair 1956, 1960
- (England) Michael Bonallack 1957, 1958, 1959, 1960
- (Scotland) Alan Bussell 1956, 1957, 1959
- (Republic of Ireland) Joe Carr 1956, 1957, 1958, 1959, 1960
- (England) Martin Christmas 1960
- (Republic of Ireland) Tom Craddock 1959
- (Scotland) Frank Deighton 1956, 1957
- (England) David Frame 1960
- (Scotland) Reid Jack 1956, 1957, 1958, 1959
- (England) Michael Lunt 1958, 1959
- (England) David Marsh 1959
- (England) Arthur Perowne 1956, 1958
- (Scotland) Sandy Saddler 1959, 1960
- (England) Philip Scrutton 1956, 1957
- (England) Doug Sewell 1957, 1958, 1959, 1960
- (England) Alec Shepperson 1956, 1957, 1958, 1959, 1960
- (England) Alan Thirlwell 1957, 1958
- (Scotland) James Walker 1958, 1960
- (England) Guy Wolstenholme 1956, 1957, 1958, 1960

=== Professionals ===
- (Scotland) Jimmy Adams 1956
- (England) Peter Alliss 1957, 1958, 1959
- (England) Fred Boobyer 1960
- (England) Ken Bousfield 1957, 1958, 1959, 1960
- (Republic of Ireland) Harry Bradshaw 1956, 1957, 1958
- (Scotland) Eric Brown 1957, 1958
- (England) Peter Butler 1960
- (England) Norman Drew 1959
- (England) Max Faulkner 1956, 1957
- (Scotland) Tom Haliburton 1960
- (England) Jimmy Hitchcock 1959
- (England) Bernard Hunt 1957, 1958, 1959, 1960
- (England) Jack Jacobs 1957
- (England) John Jacobs 1958
- (England) Arthur Lees 1956
- (England) Eric Lester 1957, 1959
- (Scotland) George Low 1956, 1960
- (England) Peter Mills 1957, 1958, 1959, 1960
- (Republic of Ireland) Christy O'Connor Snr 1956, 1958, 1959
- (Scotland) John Panton 1956
- (Wales) Dai Rees 1956, 1957, 1958, 1959, 1960
- (England) Syd Scott 1956, 1960
- (England) David Snell 1960
- (England) Norman Sutton 1956
- (England) Harry Weetman 1958, 1959
