= Reid Jack =

Scottish golfer

Personal information
- Full name: Robert Reid Jack
- Nationality: Scotland
- Born: 17 January 1924 Cumbernauld, Scotland
- Died: 25 June 2003 (aged 79) North Berwick, Scotland

Career
- Sport: Golf
- Status: Amateur

Best results in major championships
- Masters Tournament: DNP
- PGA Championship: DNP
- U.S. Open: DNP
- The Open Championship: T5: 1959

Robert Reid Jack (17 January 1924 – 25 June 2003) was a Scottish amateur golfer. He tied for 5th place in the 1959 Open Championship and played in the Walker Cup in 1957 and 1959.

== Amateur wins ==
- 1955 Scottish Amateur
- 1957 Amateur Championship

== Results in major championships ==
Tournament	1959	1960
The Open Championship	T5 LA	T16

Note: Jack only played in The Open Championship.

Top 10

LA = low amateur
"T" indicates a tie for a place

== Team appearances ==
- Walker Cup (representing Great Britain & Ireland): 1957, 1959
- Eisenhower Trophy (representing Great Britain & Ireland): 1958 (individual leader, tie)
- Amateurs–Professionals Match (representing the Amateurs): 1956, 1957, 1958 (winners), 1959
- St Andrews Trophy (representing Great Britain & Ireland): 1956 (winners)
- Commonwealth Tournament (representing Great Britain): 1959
