= 1960 Eisenhower Trophy =

Coordinates: 40.001°N 75.312°W

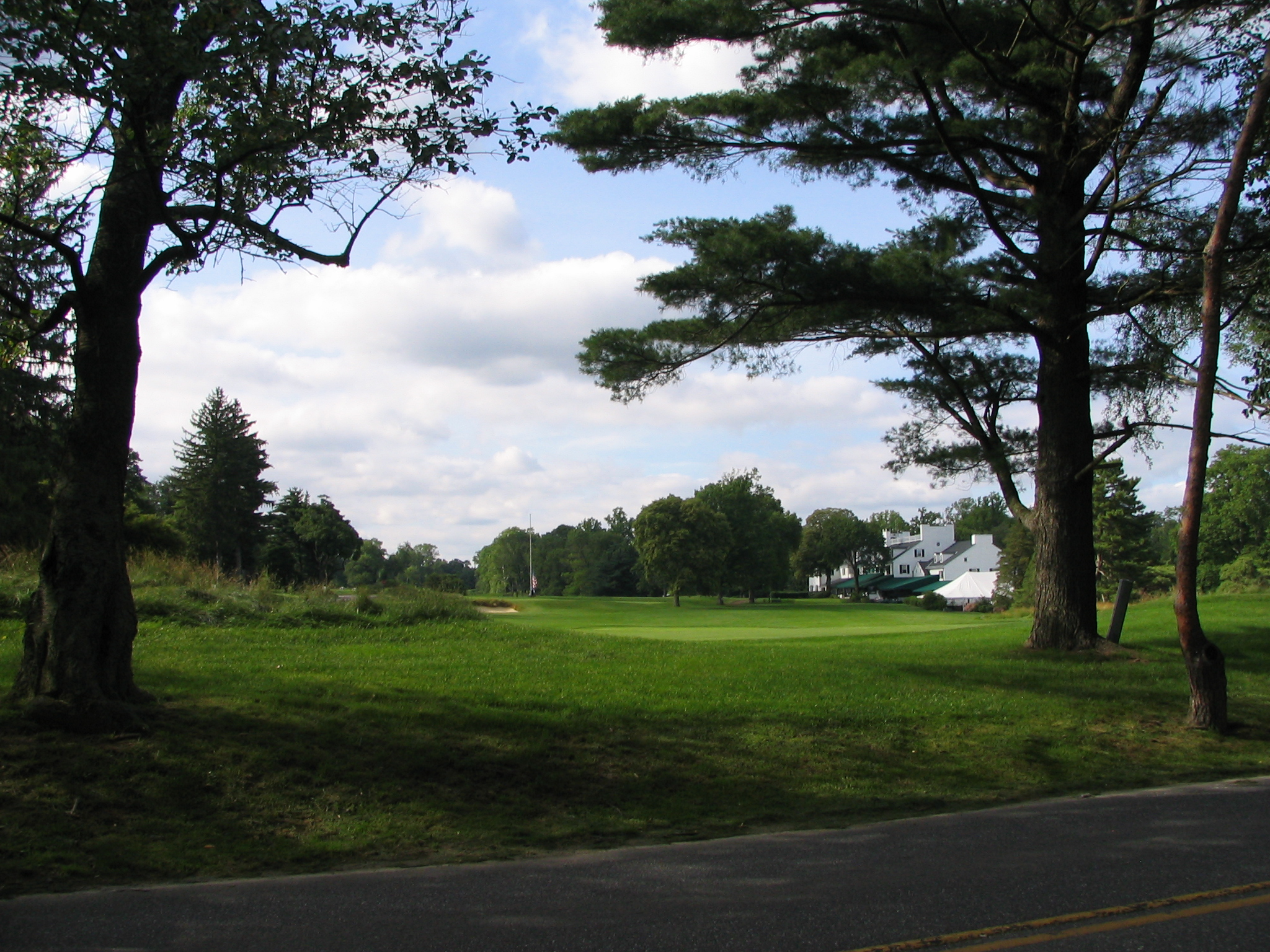
- Merion Golf Club

Tournament information
- Dates: September 28 – October 1
- Location: Ardmore, Pennsylvania
- Course: Merion Golf Club
- Format: 72 holes stroke play

Statistics
- Par: 70
- Length: 6,694 yards (6,121 m)
- Field: 32 teams 126 players

Champion
- United States; Deane Beman, Robert W. Gardner, Bill Hyndman & Jack Nicklaus
- 834 (−6)

The 1960 Eisenhower Trophy took place September 28 to October 1 at the Merion Golf Club in Ardmore, Pennsylvania. It was the second World Amateur Team Championship for the Eisenhower Trophy. The tournament was a 72-hole stroke play team event with 32 four-man teams. The best three scores for each round counted towards the team total.

United States won the Eisenhower Trophy, finishing 42 strokes ahead of the silver medalists, Australia. Great Britain and Ireland finished five strokes behind Australia and took the bronze medal while South Africa finished fourth. Jack Nicklaus completed the four rounds in 269, 13 strokes better than anyone else and 19 strokes better than the best non-American, Bruce Devlin.

== Teams ==
32 teams contested the event. Each team had four players with the exception of Ceylon and the United Arab Republic who were represented by only three players. Of the teams that competed in 1958, Iceland, Kenya and Spain were not represented. Ceylon, Denmark, Mexico, Peru, Rhodesia & Nyasaland and the United Arab Republic were represented for the first time.

Country	Players
Argentina	Roberto Benito, Guillermo Carman, Jorge Ledesma, Angel Monguzzi
Australia	Ted Ball, Jack Coogan, Bruce Devlin, Eric Routley
Austria	Hugo Hild, Fritz Jonak, Alexander Maculan, Klaus Nierlich
Belgium	Jacky Moerman, Eric Taveruier, Philippe Washer, Freddy Rodesch
Bermuda	Joseph T. DeCosta, James A. Pearman, Richard S.L. Pearman, George E. Wardman
Brazil	Humberto de Almeida, Joao Barbosa, Fernando Chaves Barcellos, Carlos Sozio
Canada	Keith Alexander, Gary Cowan, John Johnston, Bob Wylie
Ceylon	W. Pinsiri Fernando, J. Francis Silva, C. Upali Senanayake
Republic of China	Chang Tung-chang, C.C. Chen, Jeffrey Koo, Stanley Shen
Denmark	Herluf Hansen, John Jacobsen, Henrik Lund, Erik Staerk
Finland	Jalo Grönlund, Pentti E. Nurminen, T. Nyström, Mauri O. Vikström
France	Marius Bardana, Jean Pierre Cros, Patrick Cros, Henri de Lamaze
Great Britain & Ireland	Michael Bonallack, Joe Carr, Doug Sewell, Guy Wolstenholme
India	A.S. Malik, I.S. Malik, R.K. Pitamber, P. G. Sethi
Italy	Eduardo Bergamo, Nadi Berruti, Franco Bevione, Alberto Schiaffino
Japan	Kiyoshi Ishimoto, Takeaki Kaneda, Ginjiro Nakabe, Makoto Tanaka
Malaya	Choong Ewe Seong, T.S. Leong, Patrick Lim, H. Y. Loh
Mexico	Juan Antonio Estrada, Roberto Halpern, Rafael Quiroz, Mauricio Urdaneta
Netherlands	Robbie E. van Erven Dorens, Joan F. Dudok van Heel, Jani A.R. Roland Holst, Ajef F. Knappert
New Zealand	Bob Charles, Walter Godfrey, Stuart Jones, Ross Newdick
Norway	Jan Aaseth, John Johansen, Kåre Kittilsen, Arve Pedersen
Peru	Luis Fraser, Luis Larrabure, Alfonso Noriega, Carlos A. Raffo
Philippines	Augustin Coscolluela Jr, Melanio Gana, Alejandro Prieto, Luis F. Silverio
Portugal	Nuno Alberto de Brito e Cunha, Duarte Espirito Santo Silva, Visconte de Pereira Machado, Jose de Sousa e Melo
Rhodesia and Nyasaland	Benny Brews, John Drysdale, Dave Proctor, Ken Treloar
South Africa	Murray Grindrod, Jannie le Roux, Reg Taylor, Arthur Walker
Sweden	Gustaf Adolf Bielke, Rune Karlfeldt, Lennart Leinborn, Göran Lindeblad
Switzerland	Olivier Barras, Otto Dillier, Peter Gutermann, Hans Schweizer
United Arab Republic	Vladimir Blazek, Marwan Djeddaoui, Zakaria Taber
United States	Deane Beman, Robert W. Gardner, Bill Hyndman, Jack Nicklaus
Venezuela	Alfredo A. Behrens, Jack Corrie, Julio L. Torres, Rafael E. Vaamonde
West Germany	Walter Bruschne, Hans Lampert, Peter Möller, Erik Sellschopp

== Scores ==
Place	Country	Score	To par
1st place, gold medalist(s)	United States	208-205-203-218=834	−6
2nd place, silver medalist(s)	Australia	219-220-215-222=876	+36
3rd place, bronze medalist(s)	Great Britain & Ireland	218-215-221-227=881	+41
4	South Africa	220-225-215-233=893	+53
5	New Zealand	217-225-220-233=895	+55
6	Canada	230-220-222-234=906	+66
7	Mexico	217-225-227-240=909	+69
8	Rhodesia and Nyasaland	224-226-223-241=914	+74
9	Argentina	225-228-224-240=917	+77
10	Sweden	227-228-229-239=923	+83
11	Italy	227-229-233-246=935	+95
12	France	226-232-232-247=937	+97
13	West Germany	236-230-226-248=940	+100
14	Philippines	230-229-232-251=942	+102
15	Denmark	230-231-243-248=952	+112
16	Japan	237-231-245-241=954	+114
17	Belgium	231-242-244-243=960	+120
18	Venezuela	245-231-238-248=962	+122
19	Brazil	235-244-239-254=972	+132
20	India	233-244-245-253=975	+135
T21	Republic of China	237-240-240-260=977	+137
T21	Switzerland	238-248-243-248=977	+137
23	Norway	239-243-240-257=979	+139
24	Peru	242-258-245-254=999	+159
25	Bermuda	243-252-248-258=1001	+161
26	Austria	244-247-248-266=1005	+165
27	Netherlands	250-245-252-261=1008	+168
28	Finland	246-259-264-254=1023	+183
29	Portugal	250-259-247-279=1035	+195
30	United Arab Republic	263-255-256-271=1045	+205
31	Malaya	263-271-282-283=1099	+259
32	Ceylon	271-265-282-286=1104	+264

== Individual leaders ==
There was no official recognition for the lowest individual scores.

Place	Player	Country	Score	To par
1	Jack Nicklaus	United States	66-67-68-68=269	−11
2	Deane Beman	United States	71-67-69-75=282	+2
3	Bruce Devlin	Australia	74-70-70-74=288	+8
T4	Robert W. Gardner	United States	71-71-68-79=289	+9
T4	Bill Hyndman	United States	71-76-67-75=289	+9
T6	Bob Charles	New Zealand	70-75-70-76=291	+11
T6	Eric Routley	Australia	72-75-72-72=291	+11
8	Juan Antonio Estrada	Mexico	71-72-76-75=294	+14
9	Jannie le Roux	South Africa	74-75-72-74=295	+15
10	Michael Bonallack	Great Britain & Ireland	73-72-73-78=296	+16
