= Jeyes Tournament =

Tournament information
- Location: Ireland
- Established: 1962
- Format: 72-hole stroke play
- Final year: 1966

Final champion
- Dave Thomas

The Jeyes Professional and Amateur Tournament was an Irish golf tournament played from 1962 to 1966. The event featured a number of amateurs who competed for separate prizes. The event was sponsored by Jeyes Group.

The inaugural event in 1962 featured separate sections for professionals and amateurs who competed for separate prizes. After the first 36 holes, the leading 22 players in each section competed on the final day. An Irish amateur, David Sheahan finished on 282, winning the amateur section by 8 strokes, and ahead of all the professionals, led by Denis Hutchinson on 283.

== Winners ==
Year	Venue	Winner	Score	Margin of victory	Runner-up	Winner's share (£)	Ref
1962	Royal Dublin	(Republic of Ireland) David Sheahan (a)	282	1 stroke	(South Africa) Denis Hutchinson (Note: As winner of the professional section, Hutchinson collected the first prize of £550.)	(550)	
1963	Royal Dublin	(England) Guy Wolstenholme	269	12 strokes	(Australia) Frank Phillips	700	
1964	Cork	(Republic of Ireland) Christy O'Connor Snr	276	1 stroke	(Australia) Peter Thomson	450	
1965	Bangor	(England) Peter Alliss	271	4 strokes	(Wales) Dave Thomas	450	
1966	Killarney	(Wales) Dave Thomas	207 (Note: The 1966 event was reduced to 54 holes when bad weather caused the abandonment of the final round.)	1 stroke	(England) Peter Alliss	500	
