= 1957 Walker Cup =

Golf tournament

16th Walker Cup Match
- Dates: August 30–31, 1957
- Venue: The Minikahda Club
- Location: Minneapolis, Minnesota
- Captains: Charles Coe (USA); Gerald Micklem (GB&I)
| (United States) | 8 | 3 | (United Kingdom) (Republic of Ireland) |
- United States wins the Walker Cup

The 1957 Walker Cup, the 16th Walker Cup Match, was played on August 30 and 31, 1957, at the Minikahda Club, Minneapolis, Minnesota. The United States won by 8 matches to 3 with one match halved.

== Format ==
Four 36-hole matches of foursomes were played on Friday and eight singles matches on Saturday. Each of the 12 matches was worth one point in the larger team competition. If a match was all square after the 36th hole extra holes were not played. The team with most points won the competition. If the two teams were tied, the previous winner would retain the trophy.

== Teams ==
Ten players for the United States and Great Britain & Ireland participated in the event plus one non-playing captain for each team. Michael Bonallack was in the Great Britain & Ireland team but was not selected for any matches.

=== United States ===
Captain: Charles Coe

- Rex Baxter
- Arnold Blum
- Joe Campbell
- William C. Campbell
- Bill Hyndman
- Chuck Kocsis
- Billy Joe Patton
- Hillman Robbins
- Mason Rudolph
- Bud Taylor

=== Great Britain & Ireland ===
&
Captain: (England) Gerald Micklem

- (England) Michael Bonallack
- (Scotland) Alan Bussell
- (Republic of Ireland) Joe Carr
- (Scotland) Frank Deighton
- (Scotland) Reid Jack
- (England) Philip Scrutton
- (England) Doug Sewell
- (England) Alec Shepperson
- (England) Alan Thirlwell
- (England) Guy Wolstenholme

== Friday's foursomes ==
| & | Results |
|---|---|---|
| Carr/Deighton | (United States) 2 & 1 | Baxter/Patton |
| Bussell/Scrutton | (United States) 4 & 3 | Campbell/Taylor |
| Jack/Sewell | (United Kingdom) (Republic of Ireland) 1 up | Blum/Kocsis |
| Shepperson/Wolstenholme | halved | Robbins/Rudolph |
| 1 | Foursomes | 2 |
| 1 | Overall | 2 |

== Saturday's singles ==
| & | Results |
|---|---|---|
| Reid Jack | (United States) 1 up | Billy Joe Patton |
| Joe Carr | (United States) 3 & 2 | William C. Campbell |
| Alan Thirlwell | (United States) 4 & 3 | Rex Baxter |
| Frank Deighton | (United States) 7 & 6 | Bill Hyndman |
| Alan Bussell | (United Kingdom) (Republic of Ireland) 1 up | Joe Campbell |
| Doug Sewell | (United States) 1 up | Bud Taylor |
| Philip Scrutton | (United States) 3 & 2 | Mason Rudolph |
| Guy Wolstenholme | (United Kingdom) (Republic of Ireland) 2 & 1 | Hillman Robbins |
| 2 | Singles | 6 |
| 3 | Overall | 8 |
