= Saunton Golf Club =

Golf club in Devon, England

Coordinates: 51.117°N 4.209°W

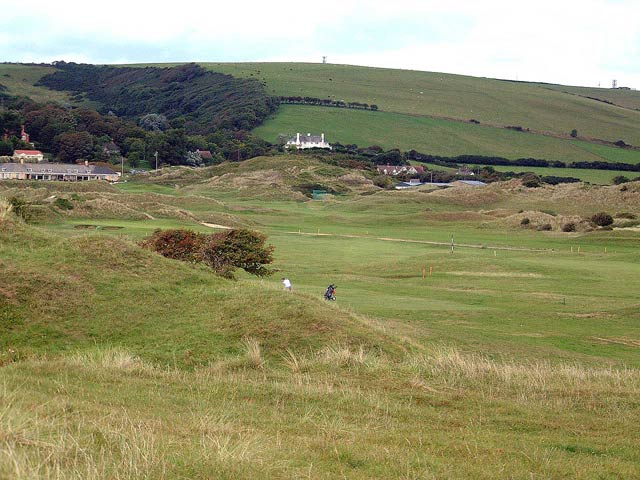
Saunton Golf Course

Saunton Golf Club is a private golf club in England, that is located about 2 miles (3 km) to the west of Braunton, Devon. It was founded in 1897. During the months of May and June 1944 the United States Army used the links as a camping area for the 771st Tank Destroyer Battalion.

Saunton has two golf courses, East and West, and has hosted many prestigious amateur championships including the English Amateur, the Seniors Amateur Championship in 2006 and 2024 and the Brabazon Trophy on several occasions. In 1997, Sergio García won the British Boys' Championship at Saunton.
