= English Amateur =

National amateur golf championship of England

Tournament information
- Location: England
- Established: 1925
- Courses: Royal Liverpool Golf Club; Wallasey and Golf Club (2025)
- Organised by: England Golf
- Format: Match play
- Month played: July/August

Tournament record score
- Score: 12 & 11 Michael Bonallack (1968)

Current champion
- Henry Styles

The English Amateur is the national amateur golf championship of England. It has been played annually since 1925 (except for war years) and is organised by England Golf.

The English Men's Amateur Championship is contested through two phases. It begins with a 36-hole stroke play competition, with the leading 64 competitors progressing to the knock-out match play competition. Since there are exactly 64 places available in the knock-out stage, countback over the championship course, then back 9, back 6, back 3 and back 1 hole determine tie resolution. All matches in the knock-out phase are played over 18 holes except the final, which is played over 36 holes.

The equivalent stroke play championship is the Brabazon Trophy.

== Winners ==
| Year | Venue | Winner | Score | Runner-up | Ref |
|---|---|---|---|---|---|
| 2026 | Beau Desert Golf Club; Sutton Coldfield Golf Club | Jamie Van Wyk | 4 & 2 | Morton Bailey | |
| 2025 | Royal Liverpool Golf Club; Wallasey and Golf Club | Henry Styles | 5 & 4 | Max Hopkins | |
| 2024 | Seaton Carew Golf Club | Harley Smith | 37th hole | Will Tate | |
| 2023 | Ferndown Golf Club | Ben Brown | 38th hole | Tyler Weaver | |
| 2022 | Lindrick Golf Club | Joe Sullivan | 3 & 1 | George Ash | |
| 2021 | Moortown Golf Club | John Gough | 1 up | Tom Addy | |
| 2020 | Woodhall Spa Golf Club | Jack Cope | 4 & 3 | Callan Barrow | |
| 2019 | Hankley Common Golf Club | Conor Gough | 3 & 2 | Callum Farr | |
| 2018 | Formby Golf Club | Thomas Thurloway | 6 & 5 | Joe Long | |
| 2017 | Berkshire Golf Club | Todd Clements | 2 & 1 | Jack Gaunt | |
| 2016 | Ganton Golf Club | Dan Brown | 2 up | George Bloor | |
| 2015 | Alwoodley Golf Club | Joe Dean | 9 & 7 | Alfie Plant | |
| 2014 | Saunton Golf Club | Nick Marsh | 2 & 1 | Scott Gregory | |
| 2013 | Frilford Heath Golf Club | Callum Shinkwin | 4 & 3 | Matt Fitzpatrick | |
| 2012 | Silloth-on-Solway Golf Club | Harry Ellis | 2 & 1 | Henry Tomlinson | |
| 2011 | Woburn Golf and Country Club | Steven Brown | 7 & 5 | Jamie Clare | |
| 2010 | Little Aston Golf Club | Tommy Fleetwood | 1 up | Warren Harmston | |
| 2009 | Rye Golf Club | Luke Goddard | 3 & 2 | Farren Keenan | |
| 2008 | Woodhall Spa Golf Club | Todd Adcock | 2 & 1 | Chris Paisley | |
| 2007 | Royal St George's Golf Club | Danny Willett | 3 & 2 | Matthew Cryer | |
| 2006 | Burnham & Berrow Golf Club | Ross McGowan | 5 & 4 | Oliver Fisher | |
| 2005 | Bromborough Golf Club | Paul Waring | 3 & 2 | Steven Capper | |
| 2004 | Notts Golf Club (Hollinwell) | James Heath | 3 & 2 | David Horsey | |
| 2003 | Alwoodley Golf Club | Gary Lockerbie | 6 & 5 | Michael Skelton | |
| 2002 | Walton Heath Golf Club | Richard Finch | 6 & 5 | Giles Legg | |
| 2001 | Saunton Golf Club | Scott Godfrey | 4 & 3 | Simon Robinson | |
| 2000 | Royal Lytham & St Annes Golf Club | Paul Casey | 4 & 2 | Gary Wolstenholme | |
| 1999 | St. Mellion Golf Club | Paul Casey | 2 & 1 | Simon Dyson | |
| 1998 | Woodhall Spa Golf Club | Mark Sanders | 6 & 5 | Simon Gorry | |
| 1997 | Royal Liverpool Golf Club | Aran Wainwright | 2 & 1 | Phil Rowe | |
| 1996 | Notts Golf Club (Hollinwell) | Shaun P. Webster | 6 & 4 | Denny Lucas | |
| 1995 | Hunstanton Golf Club | Mark Foster | 6 & 5 | Sam Jarman | |
| 1994 | Moortown Golf Club | Mark Foster | 8 & 7 | Alan Johnson | |
| 1993 | Saunton Golf Club | David Fisher | 3 & 1 | Richard Bland | |
| 1992 | Royal Cinque Ports Golf Club | Stuart Cage | 3 & 2 | Raiff Hutt | |
| 1991 | Formby Golf Club | Ricky Willison | 10 & 8 | Mark Pullan | |
| 1990 | Woodhall Spa Golf Club | Ian Garbutt | 8 & 7 | Gary Evans | |
| 1989 | Royal St George's Golf Club | Steven Richardson | 2 & 1 | Bobby Eggo | |
| 1988 | Royal Birkdale Golf Club | Russell Claydon | 38th hole | David Curry | |
| 1987 | Frilford Heath Golf Club | Kevin Weeks | 37th hole | Bobby Eggo | |
| 1986 | Hillside Golf Club | Jonathan Langmead | 2 & 1 | Bernard White | |
| 1985 | Little Aston Golf Club | Roger Winchester | 1 up | Peter Robinson | |
| 1984 | Woodhall Spa Golf Club | David Gilford | 2 & 1 | Mark Gerrard | |
| 1983 | Wentworth Club | Craig Laurence | 7 & 6 | Ashley Brewer | |
| 1982 | Royal Liverpool Golf Club | Andrew Oldcorn | 4 & 3 | Ian Bradshaw | |
| 1981 | Burnham & Berrow Golf Club | David Blakeman | 3 & 1 | Andy Stubbs | |
| 1980 | Moortown Golf Club | Peter Deeble | 4 & 3 | Peter McEvoy | |
| 1979 | Royal St George's Golf Club | Roger Chapman | 6 & 5 | Andrew Carman | |
| 1978 | Royal Birkdale Golf Club | Paul Downes | 1 up | Paul Hoad | |
| 1977 | Walton Heath Golf Club | Terry Shingler | 4 & 3 | John Mayell | |
| 1976 | Ganton Golf Club | Peter Deeble | 3 & 1 | John Davies | |
| 1975 | Royal Lytham & St Annes Golf Club | Nick Faldo | 6 & 5 | David Eccleston | |
| 1974 | Woodhall Spa Golf Club | Mark James | 6 & 5 | John Watts | |
| 1973 | Formby Golf Club | Harry Ashby | 5 & 4 | Carl Mason | |
| 1972 | Northumberland Golf Club | Harry Ashby | 5 & 4 | Roger Revell | |
| 1971 | Burnham & Berrow Golf Club | Warren Humphreys | 9 & 8 | John Davies | |
| 1970 | Royal Birkdale Golf Club | David Marsh | 6 & 4 | Geoff Birtwell | |
| 1969 | Royal St George's Golf Club | John Cook | 6 & 4 | Peter Dawson | |
| 1968 | Ganton Golf Club | Michael Bonallack | 12 & 11 | David Kelley | |
| 1967 | Woodhall Spa Golf Club | Michael Bonallack | 4 & 2 | Gordon Hyde | |
| 1966 | Royal Lytham & St Annes Golf Club | Michael Lunt | 3 & 2 | Dudley Millensted | |
| 1965 | The Berkshire Golf Club | Michael Bonallack | 3 & 2 | Clive Clark | |
| 1964 | Notts Golf Club (Hollinwell) | David Marsh | 1 up | Rodney Foster | |
| 1963 | Burnham & Berrow Golf Club | Michael Bonallack | 4 & 3 | Alan Thirlwell | |
| 1962 | Moortown Golf Club | Michael Bonallack | 2 & 1 | Michael Lunt | |
| 1961 | Wentworth Club | Ian Caldwell | 37th hole | Gordon Clark | |
| 1960 | Hunstanton Golf Club | Doug Sewell | 41st hole | Martin Christmas | |
| 1959 | Formby Golf Club | Guy Wolstenholme | 1 up | Michael Bonallack | |
| 1958 | Walton Heath Golf Club | Doug Sewell | 8 & 7 | David Proctor | |
| 1957 | Royal Liverpool Golf Club | Arthur Walker | 4 & 3 | Gordon Whitehead | |
| 1956 | Royal Lytham & St Annes Golf Club | Guy Wolstenholme | 1 up | Harry Bennett | |
| 1955 | Ganton Golf Club | Alan Thirlwell | 7 & 6 | Michael Burgess | |
| 1954 | Royal St George's Golf Club | Alan Thirlwell | 2 & 1 | Harry Bentley | |
| 1953 | Royal Birkdale Golf Club | Gerald Micklem | 2 & 1 | Ronnie White | |
| 1952 | Burnham & Berrow Golf Club | Bunny Millward | 2 up | Terry Shorrock | |
| 1951 | Hunstanton Golf Club | Geoffrey Roberts | 39th hole | Harry Bennett | |
| 1950 | Royal Cinque Ports Golf Club | John Langley | 1 up | Ian Patey | |
| 1949 | Formby Golf Club | Ronnie White | 5 & 4 | Charlie Stowe | |
| 1948 | Little Aston Golf Club | Alan Helm | 2 & 1 | Harley Roberts | |
| 1947 | Ganton Golf Club | Gerald Micklem | 1 up | Charlie Stowe | |
| 1946 | Royal Mid-Surrey Golf Club | Ian Patey | 5 & 4 | Ken Thom | |
1940–45: No tournament due to World War II
| 1939 | Royal Birkdale Golf Club | Arnold Bentley | 5 & 4 | Bill Sutton | |
| 1938 | Moortown Golf Club | Frank Pennink | 2 & 1 | Sydney Banks | |
| 1937 | Saunton Golf Club | Frank Pennink | 6 & 5 | Leonard Crawley | |
| 1936 | Deal Golf Club | Harry Bentley | 5 & 4 | John Langley | |
| 1935 | Notts Golf Club (Hollinwell) | John Woollam | 2 & 1 | Eric Fiddian | |
| 1934 | Formby Golf Club | Stanley Lunt | 37th hole | Leonard Crawley | |
| 1933 | Ganton Golf Club | John Woollam | 4 & 3 | Dale Bourn | |
| 1932 | Royal St George's Golf Club | Eric Fiddian | 1 up | Stewart Bradshaw | |
| 1931 | Hunstanton Golf Club | Leonard Crawley | 1 up | Bill Sutton | |
| 1930 | Burnham & Berrow Golf Club | Dale Bourn | 3 & 2 | Cyril Hardman | |
| 1929 | Gosforth Park Golf Club | Bill Sutton | 3 & 2 | Edward Tipping | |
| 1928 | Royal Lytham & St Annes Golf Club | Alf Stout | 3 & 2 | Philip Perkins | |
| 1927 | Little Aston Golf Club | Philip Perkins | 2 & 1 | John Beddard | |
| 1926 | Walton Heath Golf Club | Froes Ellison | 6 & 4 | Cecil Hayward | |
| 1925 | Royal Liverpool Golf Club | Froes Ellison | 1 up | Samuel Robinson | |

== Host courses ==
The English Amateur has been played at the following courses, listed in order of number of times hosted (as of 2020):

- 7 Woodhall Spa Golf Club
- 6 Royal St George's Golf Club, Burnham & Berrow Golf Club, Ganton Golf Club, Formby Golf Club
- 5 Royal Lytham & St Annes Golf Club, Royal Birkdale Golf Club,
- 4 Royal Liverpool Golf Club, Saunton Golf Club, Moortown Golf Club, Notts (Hollinwell) Golf Club, Little Aston Golf Club, Hunstanton Golf Club, Walton Heath Golf Club
- 3 Royal Cinque Ports Golf Club
- 2 The Berkshire Golf Club, Wentworth Golf Club, Alwoodley Golf Club, Frilford Heath Golf Club
- 1 Hillside Golf Club, Rye Golf Club, Littlestone Golf Club, Silloth-on-Solway Golf Club, Royal Mid-Surrey Golf Club, Seascale Golf Club, St. Mellion, Woburn Golf Club, Northumberland Golf Club, Sutton Coldfield Golf Club, North Hants Golf Club, Hankley Common Golf Club, Gosforth Park Golf Club, Scarborough South Cliff Golf Club, Hesketh Golf Club, Bromborough Golf Club.
