= Harry Bentley (golfer) =

English amateur golfer

Personal information
- Full name: Harry Geoffrey Bentley
- Nationality: England
- Born: 13 October 1907 Manchester, England
- Died: 17 October 1991 (aged 84) Paris, France

Career
- Sport: Golf
- Status: Amateur

Best results in major championships
- Masters Tournament: DNP
- PGA Championship: DNP
- U.S. Open: DNP
- The Open Championship: T39: 1932

Harry Geoffrey Bentley (13 October 1907 – 17 October 1991) was an English international amateur golfer. He won the open national amateur championships of England, France, Germany and Italy and represented Great Britain and Ireland in the Walker Cup on three occasions, including the first winning team, in 1938. He also finished as the leading amateur in the French, Belgian and Czechoslovak open championships, and was runner-up in several national amateur championships.

Bentley was born in Manchester on 13 October 1907, and was a member of Hesketh Golf Club, along with his brother Arnold, who was also a successful amateur golfer. He died in Paris in October 1991, at the age of 84.

== Tournament wins ==
- 1931 French Open Amateur Championship, Lancashire Amateur Championship
- 1932 French Open Amateur Championship, Lancashire Amateur Championship, Royal St. George's Gold Cup
- 1933 German Open Amateur Championship
- 1934 Royal Blackheath Cup
- 1935 Prince of Wales Cup
- 1936 English Amateur Championship
- 1937 German Open Amateur Championship
- 1938 German Open Amateur Championship
- 1939 German Open Amateur Championship, Lancashire Amateur Championship
- 1948 Monte Carlo Amateur Championship
- 1949 Monte Carlo Amateur Championship
- 1954 Italian Open Amateur Championship

== Team appearances ==
- Walker Cup (representing Great Britain and Ireland): 1934, 1936, 1938 (winners)
- Men's Home Internationals (representing England): 1932, 1933, 1934, 1935 (joint winners), 1936, 1937, 1938 (winners), 1947 (winners)
- England–Scotland Amateur Match (representing England): 1931
- England–France Amateur Match (representing England): 1934 (winners), 1935 (winners), 1936 (winners), 1937 (winners), 1939, 1954 (winners)
