= 1959 Walker Cup =

Golf tournament

17th Walker Cup Match
- Dates: 15–16 May 1959
- Venue: Muirfield
- Location: Gullane, East Lothian, Scotland
- Captains: Gerald Micklem (GB&I); Charles Coe (USA)
(United Kingdom) (Republic of Ireland)	3	9	(United States)
- United States wins the Walker Cup

The 1959 Walker Cup, the 17th Walker Cup Match, was played on 15 and 16 May 1959, at Muirfield, Gullane, East Lothian, Scotland. The United States won by 9 matches to 3. The United States won all four of the foursomes matches on the first day. Although Great Britain and Ireland won three of the singles matches on the second day, it was a comfortable win for the United States.

== Format ==
Four 36-hole matches of foursomes were played on Friday and eight singles matches on Saturday. Each of the 12 matches was worth one point in the larger team competition. If a match was all square after the 36th hole extra holes were not played. The team with most points won the competition. If the two teams were tied, the previous winner would retain the trophy.

== Teams ==
Great Britain & Ireland had a team of 10 plus a non-playing captain. Gerald Micklem was selected as the non-playing captain in November 1958 at which time an initial group of 14 possible players was also announced. The team was announced on 15 April and included James Walker with Dickson Smith as the reserve. Later in April Walker withdrew after being involved in a car accident which left him with a knee injury. He was replaced in the team by Smith. A few days later Alan Thirlwell and Sandy Saddler were chosen as first and second reserves but were not required.

Great Britain and Ireland
Name	Age	Previous Walker Cups	Matches	W–L–H	Winning percentage
(England) Gerald Micklem	47	Non-playing captain
(England) Michael Bonallack	24	1	0	0–0–0	–
(Republic of Ireland) Joe Carr	37	6	12	3–8–1	29.17
(Scotland) Reid Jack	35	1	2	1–1–0	50.00
(England) Michael Lunt	23	0	Rookie
(England) David Marsh	25	0	Rookie
(England) Arthur Perowne	29	2	3	0–3–0	0.00
(England) Doug Sewell	29	1	2	1–1–0	50.00
(England) Alec Shepperson	23	1	1	0–0–1	50.00
(Scotland) Dickson Smith	41	0	Rookie
(England) Guy Wolstenholme	28	1	2	1–0–1	75.00

The United States only selected a team of 9, which included a playing captain. The team was selected in early February. The American team arrived in Scotland on 8 May.

USA
Name	Age	Previous Walker Cups	Matches	W–L–H	Winning percentage
Charles Coe – captain	35	3	5	1–3–1	30.00
Tommy Aaron	22	0	Rookie
Deane Beman	21	0	Rookie
Bill Hyndman	43	1	1	1–0–0	100.00
Jack Nicklaus	19	0	Rookie
Billy Joe Patton	37	2	4	4–0–0	100.00
Bud Taylor	42	1	2	2–0–0	100.00
Harvie Ward	33	2	4	4–0–0	100.00
Ward Wettlaufer	23	0	Rookie

== Friday's foursomes ==
Deane Beman was left out of the United States team, while David Marsh and Dickson Smith were left out of British and Irish team. After the morning round Patton and Coe were 9 holes up but the other three matches were close, with Hyndman and Aaron 2 holes up and Great Britain and Ireland leading by 1 hole in the other two matches, Conditions were more difficult in the afternoon, with a stronger breeze. Patton and Coe won their match easily but the other three matches remained close. In the end, however, the United States won the first two matches by one hole while Wettlaufer and Nicklaus won at the 35th hole.

&	Results
Jack/Sewell	(United States) 1 up	Ward/Taylor
Carr/Wolstenholme	(United States) 1 up	Hyndman/Aaron
Bonallack/Perowne	(United States) 9 & 8	Patton/Coe
Lunt/Shepperson	(United States) 2 & 1	Wettlaufer/Nicklaus
0	Foursomes	4
0	Overall	4

== Saturday's singles ==
For the singles Dickson Smith replaced Arthur Perowne while Deane Beman replaced Bud Taylor. This meant that David Marsh was not selected for any matches.

&	Results
Joe Carr	(United Kingdom) (Republic of Ireland) 2 & 1	Charles Coe
Guy Wolstenholme	(United States) 9 & 8	Harvie Ward
Reid Jack	(United Kingdom) (Republic of Ireland) 5 & 3	Billy Joe Patton
Doug Sewell	(United States) 4 & 3	Bill Hyndman
Alec Shepperson	(United Kingdom) (Republic of Ireland) 2 & 1	Tommy Aaron
Michael Bonallack	(United States) 2 up	Deane Beman
Michael Lunt	(United States) 6 & 5	Ward Wettlaufer
Dickson Smith	(United States) 5 & 4	Jack Nicklaus
3	Singles	5
3	Overall	9
