= Dickson Smith =

Scottish golfer

Personal information
- Full name: William Dickson Smith
- Nationality: Scotland
- Born: 2 February 1918 Glasgow, Scotland
- Died: 25 January 2002 (aged 83) Troon, Scotland

Career
- Sport: Golf
- Status: Amateur

Best results in major championships
- Masters Tournament: DNP
- PGA Championship: DNP
- U.S. Open: DNP
- The Open Championship: T5: 1957

William Dickson Smith (2 February 1918 – 25 January 2002) was a Scottish amateur golfer. He was known as Dick or Dickson. He tied for 5th place in the 1957 Open Championship and played in the 1959 Walker Cup.

== Amateur wins ==
- 1958 Scottish Amateur

== Results in major championships ==
Tournament	1957	1958	1959	1960	1961	1962	1963	1964	1965	1966
The Open Championship	T5 LA		CUT	T40						CUT

Note: Smith only played in The Open Championship.

Top 10
Did not play

LA = low amateur
CUT = missed the half-way cut
"T" indicates a tie for a place

== Team appearances ==
- Walker Cup (representing Great Britain & Ireland): 1959
- St Andrews Trophy (representing Great Britain & Ireland): 1958 (winners)
