= Doug Sewell =

English professional golfer (1929–2017)

Personal information
- Full name: Douglas Norman Sewell
- Nationality: England
- Born: 19 November 1929 Surrey, England
- Died: 9 September 2017 (aged 87) Bournemouth, Dorset, England

Career
- Sport: Golf
- Turned professional: 1961
- Professional wins: 9

Best results in major championships
- Masters Tournament: DNP
- PGA Championship: DNP
- U.S. Open: DNP
- The Open Championship: T20: 1966

Douglas Norman Sewell (19 November 1929 – 9 September 2017) was an English professional golfer. Before turning professional he had a successful amateur career, playing in the Walker Cup in 1957 and 1959.

== Amateur career ==
Sewell was a useful amateur golfer and played in the Walker Cup in 1957 and 1959 and the Eisenhower Trophy in 1960.

Sewell won the Brabazon Trophy at Moortown Golf Club in 1957, finishing 8 strokes ahead of Tony Slark. The following year he won the English Amateur at Walton Heath Golf Club beating the Rhodesian David Proctor 8&7 in the final. Proctor qualified because his father was born in England. He came close to winning the Berkshire Trophy in April 1959, finishing a stroke behind Joe Carr after making a bogey at the final hole. In June he won his second Brabazon Trophy after a playoff with Michael Bonallack. They had each scored 300, seven ahead of the rest. In the 18-hole playoff Sewell scored 78 to Bonallack's 79. His aggregate score of 580 in the Berkshire and Brabazon trophies made him the first winner of the Philip Scrutton Jug. He won the English Amateur for the second time in 1960 beating Martin Christmas in the final on the 41st hole at Hunstanton Golf Club.

Sewell only played once in the Amateur Championship, losing in the 1959 quarter final to the American Bob Magee.

== Professional career ==
He turned professional in March 1961, becoming an assistant professional at Wentworth. In 1967 he became professional at Ferndown in succession to Percy Alliss. He remained at Ferndown until his retirement in 1994.

Sewell's only important professional win was in the 1970 Martini International at Conwy Golf Club where he tied with Peter Thomson. There was no playoff and the two shared the first and second prize money. He was twice runner-up in the Penfold-Bournemouth Tournament at Queens Park Golf Club. In 1971 he was in a four-way tie for second place, four strokes behind Neil Coles. In 1973 he was second again, two behind Eddie Polland.

Sewell won the inaugural PGA Club Professionals' Championship in 1973 at Calcot Park Golf Club, a stroke ahead of David Melville. The leading nine formed the team for the first Diamondhead Cup, the forerunner of the PGA Cup, played later in that year. He was 9th in the second PGA Club Professionals' Championship, again gaining a place in the British team for the Diamondhead Cup. In 1975 Sewell won the event for the second time, two strokes ahead of David Huish. He played in the first PGA Cup in October.

== Death ==
Sewell died in Bournemouth in September 2017.

== Amateur wins ==
- 1954 Surrey Amateur
- 1956 Surrey Amateur
- 1957 Brabazon Trophy
- 1958 English Amateur, Surrey Amateur
- 1959 Sunningdale Foursomes (with Michael Bonallack), Brabazon Trophy
- 1960 English Amateur, Golf Illustrated Gold Vase
- 1964 Surrey Open Amateur

== Professional wins (9) ==
=== British PGA Order of Merit wins (1) ===
No.	Date	Tournament	Winning score	Margin of victory	Joint winner
1	13 Jun 1970	Martini International	66-67-69-66=268	Tie	(Australia) Peter Thomson

=== Other wins (8) ===
- 1967 Dorset Professional Championship
- 1968 Wentworth Foursomes (with Alan Thirlwell), Strong Country Tournament, West of England Professional Championship
- 1969 Strong Country Tournament
- 1970 West of England Professional Championship
- 1973 MacGregor PGA Club Professionals' Championship
- 1975 MacGregor PGA Club Professionals' Championship

== Results in major championships ==
Tournament	1963	1964	1965	1966	1967	1968	1969	1970	1971	1972
The Open Championship	T26	CUT	T25	T20	T31				T25	T50

Note: Sewell only played in The Open Championship.

Did not play

CUT = missed the half-way cut
"T" indicates a tie for a place

== Team appearances ==
Amateur

- Walker Cup (representing Great Britain & Ireland): 1957, 1959
- Commonwealth Tournament (representing Great Britain): 1959
- Eisenhower Trophy (representing Great Britain & Ireland): 1960
- Amateurs–Professionals Match (representing the Amateurs): 1957, 1958 (winners), 1959, 1960
- St Andrews Trophy (representing Great Britain & Ireland): 1958 (winners), 1960 (winners)

Professional

- PGA Cup/Diamondhead Cup (representing Great Britain & Ireland): 1973, 1974, 1975
