= Luke Goddard =

English golfer (born 1988)

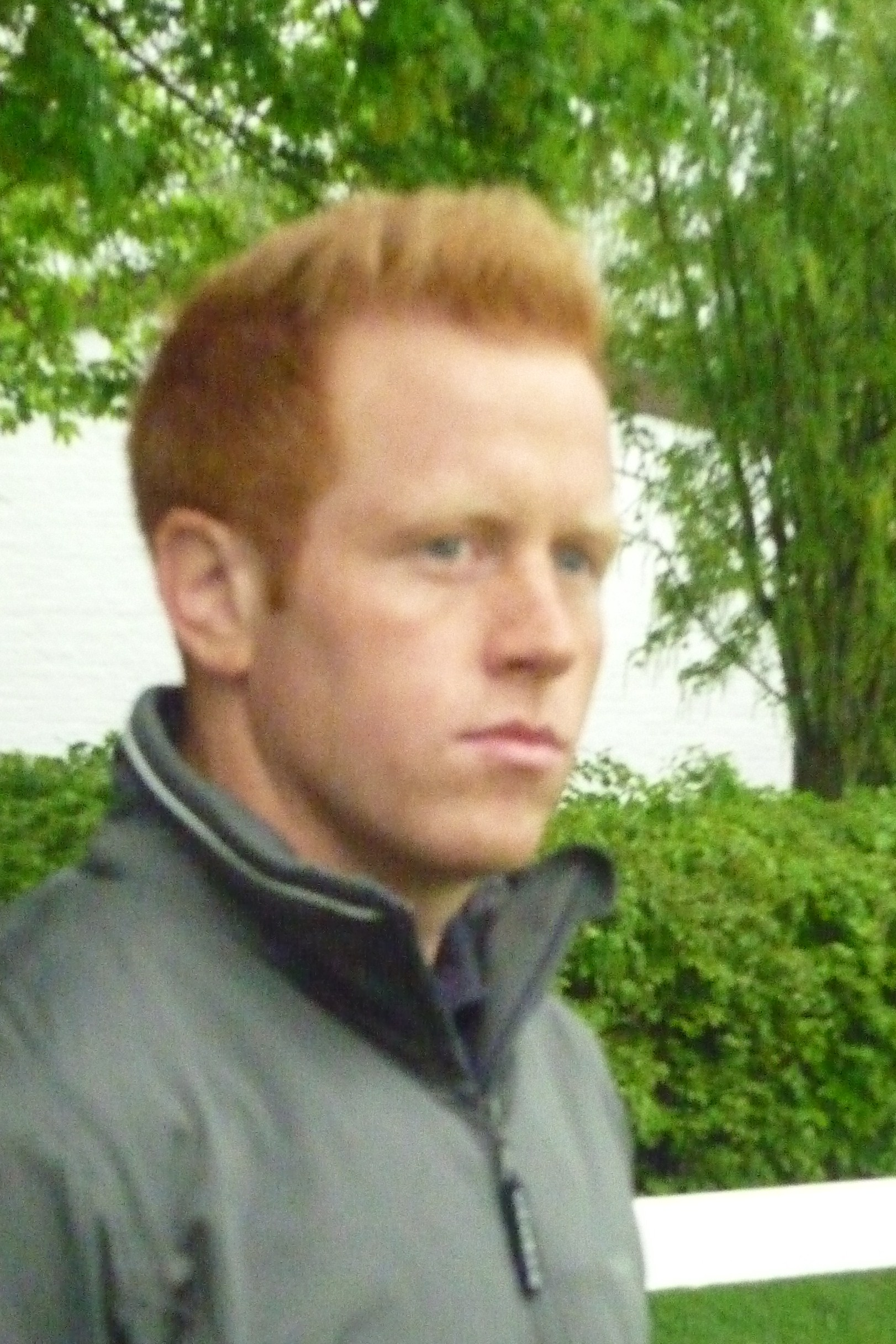

Personal information
- Nationality: England
- Born: 17 April 1988 (age 38) London, England
- Height: 5 ft 10 in (1.78 m)

Career
- Sport: Golf
- Turned professional: 2009
- Former tours: Challenge Tour; PGA EuroPro Tour
- Professional wins: 1

Luke Goddard (born 17 April 1988) is an English professional golfer.

== Career ==
Goddard was born in London, England in 1988.

Goddard had a successful amateur career, winning the 2008 Argentine Amateur Open Championship and the 2009 English Amateur. He also represented Great Britain and Ireland in the 2009 Walker Cup.

in 2009, Goddard turned professional.

== Amateur wins ==
- 2006 Peter McEvoy Trophy
- 2008 Campeonato Argentino de Aficionados (Argentine Amateur Championship)
- 2009 English Amateur

== Professional wins (1) ==
=== PGA EuroPro Tour wins (1) ===
No.	Date	Tournament	Winning score	Margin of victory	Runner-up
1	12 Aug 2011	Lingfield Park Golf Championship	−9 (68-66-70=204)	2 strokes	(England) Jamie Howarth

== Team appearances ==
Amateur

- European Boys' Team Championship (representing England): 2006
- Jacques Léglise Trophy (representing Great Britain & Ireland): 2006
- Eisenhower Trophy (representing England): 2008
- Walker Cup (representing Great Britain & Ireland): 2009
- European Amateur Team Championship (representing England): 2009
