= Harley Roberts =

English cricketer

Harley James Roberts (24 May 1912 – 17 February 1989) was an English cricketer and amateur golfer. He played first-class cricket for Warwickshire in 17 matches between 1932 and 1937. He later became an England international golfer and was runner-up in the English Amateur.

== Personal life ==
Roberts was born in Bearwood, Staffordshire (now in West Midlands), and died at Romsley, Worcestershire. He served as a justice of the peace in Smethwick.

== Cricket career ==
A right-handed lower-middle-order batsman and a right-arm fast-medium bowler, Roberts had a trial for Warwickshire in 1930 and played for the second eleven from that year, but did not make his first-class debut until 1932, when he appeared in eight matches. In his first game, he finished off the Middlesex first innings by taking the last three wickets at a personal cost of six runs in 3.1 overs. Two weeks later, in the match against Essex, he and Reg Santall put on 131 for the seventh wicket in what remains the record first-class partnership for this wicket for Warwickshire against Essex; Roberts made 61, but, aside from Santall's 63, his colleagues mustered only 43 more runs between them, and the match was lost heavily. Though Roberts remained at Warwickshire and played frequently for the second eleven, he did not improve on either the bowling or the batting figures of his early games, and his first-class career petered out in 1937.

== Golf ==
Following his cricket career, Roberts was a successful amateur golfer. He won many county and regional events and was an England international for many years. In 1948, he was runner-up in the English Amateur championship at Little Aston. In 1963, he was elected as president of the Midland Counties Golf Association.

=== Tournament wins ===
- West of England Amateur Championship: 1938
- Midland Amateur Championship: 1947, 1956, 1958
- Worcestershire Amateur Championship: 1947
- Worcestershire Open: 1955, 1956, 1962
- Midland Amateur–Professional Foursomes: 1958 (with John Wiggett)
