= David Marsh (golfer) =

British golfer and chairman (1934–2022)

David Marsh MBE
- Born: David Max Marsh; April 1934; Southport, Lancashire, England
- Died: 19 August 2022 (aged 88)
- Golf career
- Nationality: England
- Sport: Golf
- Status: Amateur

Chairman of Everton F.C.
- In office 1991–1994
- Preceded by: Philip Carter
- Succeeded by: Peter Johnson

David Max Marsh MBE (April 1934 – 19 August 2022) was a British amateur golfer who was better known for serving as the chairman of Everton Football Club.

== Career ==
Marsh was named captain of The Royal and Ancient Golf Club of St Andrews in 1990, having previously been president of the Lancashire and then English Unions between 1973 and 1975. He was the youngest captain of Southport and Ainsdale Golf Club in 1967.

Having played Rugby Union at school, Marsh joined Southport Rugby Football Club in 1957, and regularly ran out for the First XV.

Marsh won the English Amateur in 1964 and 1970, and represented England on 75 occasions. He also participated in the Walker Cup, being a member of the victorious Great Britain and Ireland team in 1971. He went on to captain the team in 1973 and 1975.

Marsh became the chairman of Everton F.C. in 1991, succeeding Philip Carter. Whilst in this position he courted with controversy over his appointment of Norwich City manager Mike Walker as Everton boss. He was succeeded by Peter Johnson in 1994.

== Personal life ==
Marsh died in August 2022, at the age of 88.

== Awards and honors ==
He was appointed Member of the Order of the British Empire (MBE) in the 2011 New Year Honours for voluntary service to amateur golf.

== Team appearances ==
- Walker Cup (representing Great Britain & Ireland): 1959, 1971 (winners), 1973 (non-playing captain), 1975 (non-playing captain)
- Amateurs–Professionals Match (representing the Amateurs): 1959
- St Andrews Trophy (representing Great Britain & Ireland): 1958 (winners)
- European Amateur Team Championship (representing England): 1971 (winners)
