= Kenneth Scott (cricketer) =

English cricketer

Kenneth Bertram Scott (17 August 1915 – 9 August 1943) was an English cricketer active from 1935 to 1937 who played for Sussex. He was born in Uckfield, Sussex and died during the Second World War near Syracuse, Sicily. He appeared in fourteen first-class matches as a righthanded batsman who bowled right-arm medium pace. He scored 274 runs with a highest score of 56 and took twelve wickets with a best performance of two for 13.

Scott, while serving as an officer with the Queen's Own Royal West Kent Regiment, was killed in World War II.
