= President's Putter =

Annual amateur golf competition

The President's Putter is an annual golf competition contested between former and current Blues golfers from Oxford and Cambridge universities. The event is held every January at the Rye Golf Club in Rye, East Sussex with the first tournament held in 1920. Those eligible to play are current and former alumni of the universities who are members of the Oxford & Cambridge Golfing Society, thus the golfers are usually amateurs and ages may vary between 20 and 70+ years. The tournament is played by scratch match play and the winner receives a silver medal in exchange for his or her winning ball, i.e. the ball with which he or she last played in the final - this ball is then attached to the Putter by means of a silver band and a silver chain. The 3 different Putters bearing the winners' golf balls are on permanent display in the clubhouse at Rye GC. Past winners include five time tournament winner Roger Wethered, Cyril Tolley and Charlie Rotheroe. Rotheroe won his third tournament in 2008. The cricketer, Iain Henderson, is a two-time winner.

The President's Putter itself was first given to the Oxford and Cambridge Golfing Society by John Low and it originally belonged to Hugh Kirkaldy. When this Putter was "full" and could accommodate no more balls, a second Putter was introduced; this belonged to Laurie Auchterlonie. The third and current Putter was brought into use in 1983 and was made by Open Championship winner Willie Park, Snr.
