= Guy Wolstenholme =

English professional golfer (1931–1984)

Personal information
- Full name: Guy Bertram Wolstenholme
- Nationality: England
- Born: 8 March 1931 Leicester, England
- Died: 9 October 1984 (aged 53) Nottingham, England

Career
- Sport: Golf
- Turned professional: 1960
- Former tours: European Tour; Asia Golf Circuit; PGA Tour of Australia; New Zealand Golf Circuit; Champions Tour
- Professional wins: 19

Best results in major championships
- Masters Tournament: DNP
- PGA Championship: DNP
- U.S. Open: DNP
- The Open Championship: 6th: 1960
- U.S. Amateur: T33: 1957
- British Amateur: T3: 1959

Guy Bertram Wolstenholme (8 March 1931 – 9 October 1984) was an English professional golfer. He had a successful career both as an amateur and then as a professional.

== Early life and amateur career ==
Wolstenholme was born in Leicester. As an amateur, Wolstenholme won both the English stroke play and match play championships, the latter on two occasions. He also won several other prestigious titles, including the Berkshire Trophy three times, and the German Amateur Championship in 1956. Wolstenholme remains one the few amateur golfers to have won both The Berkshire and Brabazon Trophies in the same calendar year.

Wolstenholme played on the Great Britain and Ireland team in the 1957 and 1959 Walker Cup matches and the 1958 and 1960 Eisenhower Trophy, finishing third both years. The highlight of his amateur career came in 1960, when finishing 6th, and low amateur, in The Open Championship at St Andrews.

== Professional career ==
Wolstenholme turned professional in 1960, and played for several years on the European Circuit, and later the European Tour following its formation in the early 1970s. Despite joining the pro ranks relatively late, he had considerable success, winning 5 tournaments including the British PGA Close Championship and three national opens. He also broke the record for the greatest winning margin on the circuit, when he won the 1963 Jeyes Tournament at Royal Dublin by 12 strokes. He emigrated to Australia in the 1960s and enjoyed more successes, winning several tournaments including the Victorian Open on four occasions.

=== Senior career ===
Wolstenholme played on the Senior PGA Tour in the United States in 1982 and 1983. He recorded two runner-up finishes, at the 1982 Greater Syracuse Senior's Pro Golf Classic and the 1983 Daytona Beach Seniors Golf Classic, and ended the season 8th on the money list in 1983.

== Personal life ==
In 1960, his son, Gary was born. Gary had a successful career as an amateur golfer before turning pro late in life.

Wolstenholme died in 1984 after losing his fight against cancer.

== Amateur wins ==
- 1956 English Amateur, Berkshire Trophy, German Amateur Open Championship
- 1957 Golf Illustrated Gold Vase
- 1958 Berkshire Trophy (tie with Arthur Perowne)
- 1959 English Amateur
- 1960 Brabazon Trophy, Berkshire Trophy

== Professional wins (19) ==
=== Asia Golf Circuit wins (1) ===
No.	Date	Tournament	Winning score	Margin of victory	Runner-up
1	13 Apr 1969	Yomiuri International	E (71-72-66-69=288)	1 stroke	(Japan) Teruo Sugihara

Asia Golf Circuit playoff record (0–1)

No.	Year	Tournament	Opponents	Result
1	1969	Singapore Open	(Australia) David Graham, (Japan) Tomio Kamata	Kamata won with birdie on third extra hole Wolstenholme eliminated by par on first hole

=== PGA Tour of Australia wins (3) ===
No.	Date	Tournament	Winning score	Margin of victory	Runner-up
1	8 Feb 1976	Victorian Open	−7 (72-72-69-68=281)	Playoff	(Australia) Graham Marsh
2	19 Feb 1978	Victorian Open (2)	−4 (77-71-67-69=284)	Playoff	(United States) Arnold Palmer
3	17 Feb 1980	Victorian Open (3)	−6 (72-74-68-68=282)	4 strokes	(Australia) Graham Marsh

PGA Tour of Australia playoff record (2–0)

No.	Year	Tournament	Opponent	Result
1	1976	Victorian Open	(Australia) Graham Marsh	Won with birdie on third extra hole
2	1978	Victorian Open	(United States) Arnold Palmer	Won with par on third extra hole

=== Other Australian wins (7) ===
- 1969 West End Tournament
- 1970 Endeavour Masters, Cronulla Masters
- 1971 South Australian Open, Victorian Open
- 1975 Victorian PGA Championship
- 1981 Australian Seniors Championship

=== New Zealand Golf Circuit wins (2) ===
No.	Date	Tournament	Winning score	Margin of victory	Runner-up
1	23 Nov 1968	Sax Altman Tournament	−3 (67-73-74-71=285)	Shared title with (Australia) Peter Thomson	
2	19 Dec 1971	City of Auckland Classic	−9 (70-65-67-73=275)	3 strokes	(Australia) Frank Phillips

=== Other wins (7) ===
- 1961 Southern Professional Championship
- 1963 Jeyes Tournament
- 1966 British PGA Close Championship
- 1967 Kenya Open, Denmark Open
- 1969 Dutch Open
- 1971 Kuzuha International

== Results in major championships ==
Amateur

Tournament	1953	1954	1955	1956	1957	1958	1959	1960
The Open Championship		CUT					T16	6 LA
U.S. Amateur					R64			
The Amateur Championship	R16	R64	R16	R64	R64	R16	SF	R32

Professional

Tournament	1961	1962	1963	1964	1965	1966	1967	1968	1969
The Open Championship	T32	T24	CUT	CUT	T17	T37	T13	CUT	T11

Tournament	1970	1971	1972	1973	1974	1975	1976	1977	1978	1979
The Open Championship	T22	T33		T39			T17	CUT	T39	T57

Note: Wolstenholme played only in The Open Championship, U.S. Amateur and The Amateur Championship

Top 10
Did not play

LA = Low Amateur
CUT = missed the half-way cut (3rd round cut in 1968 Open Championship)
"T" indicates a tie for a place
R64, R32, R16, QF, SF = Round in which player lost in match play

Source for U.S. Amateur: USGA Championship Database

Source for British Amateur: The Glasgow Herald, 29 May 1953, p. 4., The Glasgow Herald, 27 May 1954, p. 4., The Glasgow Herald, 3 June 1955, p. 4., The Glasgow Herald, 30 May 1956, p. 4., The Glasgow Herald, 29 May 1957, p. 4., The Glasgow Herald, 6 June 1958, p. 4., The Glasgow Herald, 30 May 1959, p. 9., The Glasgow Herald, 26 May 1960, p. 13.

== Team appearances ==
Amateur

- Eisenhower Trophy (representing Great Britain & Ireland): 1958, 1960
- Walker Cup (representing Great Britain & Ireland): 1957, 1959
- Amateurs–Professionals Match (representing the Amateurs): 1956, 1957, 1958 (winners), 1960
- St Andrews Trophy (representing Great Britain & Ireland): 1956 (winners)
- Commonwealth Tournament (representing Great Britain): 1959

Professional

- Canada Cup (representing England): 1965
- Double Diamond International: 1972 (Rest of the World), 1976 (Australasia)
