= Arthur Perowne (golfer) =

English golfer (1930–2018)

Personal information
- Full name: Arthur Herbert Perowne
- Nationality: England
- Born: 1930 Norwich, Norfolk, England
- Died: 10 January 2018 (aged 87) Norwich, Norfolk, England

Career
- Sport: Golf
- Status: Amateur

Best results in major championships
- Masters Tournament: DNP
- PGA Championship: DNP
- U.S. Open: DNP
- The Open Championship: CUT: 1947, 1948, 1958

Arthur Herbert Perowne (1930 – 10 January 2018) was an English amateur golfer. He played in the Walker Cup in 1949, 1953 and 1959.

Perowne won the English Boys' under–18 stroke play title (the Carris Trophy) in 1946. He reached the semi-final of the 1953 Amateur Championship, losing to the American Harvie Ward. In 1958 he shared the Berkshire Trophy with Guy Wolstenholme and won the Brabazon Trophy. Later in 1958 he played in the first Eisenhower Trophy where the Great Britain and Ireland team took the bronze medal.

== Amateur wins ==
- 1946 Carris Trophy
- 1947 Swedish Amateur Championship
- 1952 East Anglia Open
- 1958 Berkshire Trophy (tie with Guy Wolstenholme), Brabazon Trophy
- 1964 Norfolk Open
- Norfolk Amateur Championship 11 times 1948, 1951 to 1958, 1960, 1961

== Results in major championships ==
Tournament	1947	1948	1949	1950	1951	1952	1953	1954	1955	1956	1957	1958
The Open Championship	CUT	CUT										CUT

Note: Perowne only played in The Open Championship.

Did not play

CUT = missed the half-way cut

== Team appearances ==
- Walker Cup (representing Great Britain & Ireland): 1949, 1953, 1959
- Eisenhower Trophy (representing Great Britain & Ireland): 1958
- Amateurs–Professionals Match (representing the Amateurs): 1956, 1958
