= Gerald Micklem =

English golfer and administrator

Personal information
- Full name: Gerald Hugh Micklem
- Nationality: England
- Born: 14 August 1911 Banstead, Surrey, England
- Died: 21 May 1988 (aged 76) Chertsey, Surrey, England

Career
- Sport: Golf
- Status: Amateur

Best results in major championships
- Masters Tournament: DNP
- PGA Championship: DNP
- U.S. Open: DNP
- The Open Championship: CUT: 1946

Gerald Hugh Micklem CBE (14 August 1911 – 21 May 1988) was an English amateur golfer and administrator. He played in four Walker Cup matches between 1947 and 1955 and was non-playing captain in 1957 and 1959.

Micklem had limited success as a golfer before World War II, but gained an Oxford blue for golf and reached the final of the 1936 Addington Foursomes. He gained national attention when he reached the semi-final of the 1946 Amateur Championship and won the English Amateur. He played in the Walker Cup four times and won the English Amateur for a second time in 1953. Micklem later acted as a golf administrator and chaired various committees at The Royal and Ancient Golf Club of St Andrews (R&A). He was captain of the R&A in 1968 and received the Bob Jones Award in 1969 and the Walter Hagen Award in 1970. He was awarded a CBE in the 1969 New Year Honours.

== Golf career ==
Micklem made little impact as a golfer before World War II, although he gained an Oxford blue for golf and, playing with Arthur Lacey, reached the final of the 1936 Addington Foursomes.

Micklem first came to national prominence when he reached the semi-final of the 1946 Amateur Championship before losing to Robert Sweeny Jr. The following year he won the English Amateur and was selected for the 1947 Walker Cup team. In 1948, partnered with Charlie Ward, he won the Daily Telegraph Foursomes Tournament. He played in the Walker Cup three more times, in 1949, 1953 and 1955, although he only won one of his Walker Cup matches, the foursomes in 1953. He won the English Amateur for a second time in 1953.

== Golf administrator ==
Micklem was later actively involved as a golf administrator. He captained many England and Great Britain teams in international matches, including the Walker Cup team in 1957 and 1959. He chaired various committees of The Royal and Ancient Golf Club of St Andrews (R&A), including the rules of golf committee, selection committee, and championship committee, and served as captain of the R&A in 1968. He was also president of the English Golf Union in 1965–1966 and the European Golf Association in 1967 and 1969.

== Awards ==
Micklem received the Bob Jones Award in 1969 and the Walter Hagen Award in 1970. He was awarded a CBE in the 1969 New Year Honours.

== Tournament wins ==
- 1947 English Amateur
- 1948 Daily Telegraph Foursomes Tournament (with Charlie Ward), Silver Cross (R&A Spring Meeting)
- 1949 Royal Medal (R&A Autumn Meeting)
- 1950 Royal Medal (R&A Autumn Meeting)
- 1952 Royal St George's Grand Challenge Cup
- 1953 President's Putter, English Amateur
- 1955 Berkshire Trophy (tie with Kim Hall)
- 1958 R&A Silver Cross (R&A Spring Meeting)

== Team appearances ==
- Walker Cup (representing Great Britain & Ireland): 1947, 1949, 1953, 1955, 1957 (non-playing captain), 1959 (non-playing captain)
- Commonwealth Tournament (representing Great Britain): 1954
