= Frilford Heath Golf Club =

Golf club in Oxfordshire, England

Coordinates: 51°40′44″N 1°21′44″W

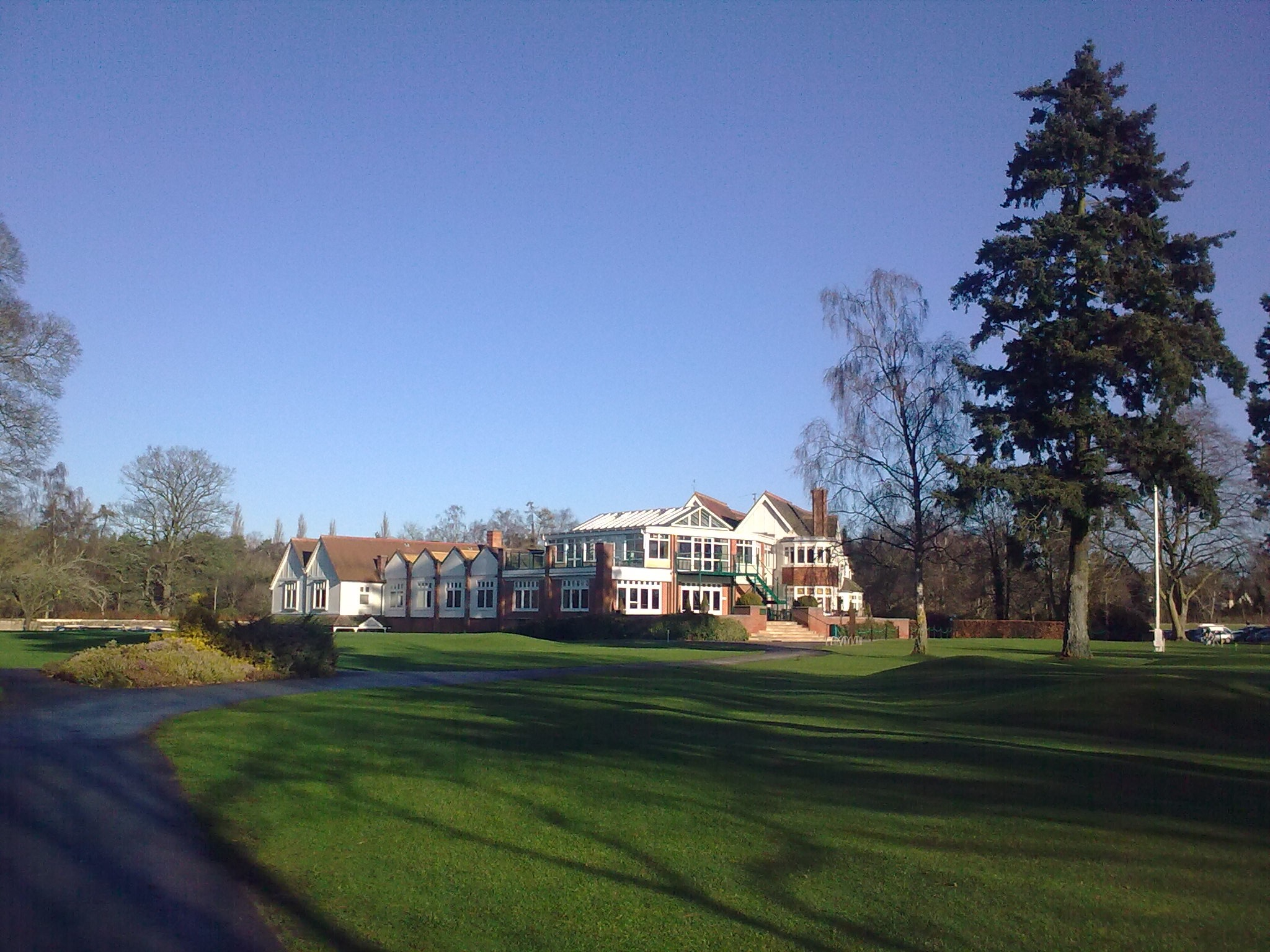
- Frilford Heath club house in 2013
- Interactive map of Frilford Heath Golf Club

Club information
- Location: Frilford, Oxfordshire (England) (United Kingdom)
- Established: 1908
- Type: Private
- Total holes: 54
- Website: www.frilfordheath.co.uk

Red Course
- Designed by: John Henry Taylor
- Par: 72
- Length: 6,912

Green Course
- Designed by: J.H. Turner
- Par: 69
- Length: 6,015

Blue Course
- Designed by: Simon Gidman
- Par: 72
- Length: 6,728

Frilford Heath Golf Club is a 54-hole golf club in Frilford, Oxfordshire, set amongst 500 acres of heathland to the southwest of Oxford city.

== History ==
Frilford Heath was founded in 1908 by Dr Harry Challenor (a local physician), A.E. Preston, and T.S. Skurray, the head of Morland Brewery (which was located nearby in Abingdon). The club held its centenary in 2008.

== Clubhouse ==
Throughout its long history and gradual expansion to 54 holes, Frilford Heath has had several clubhouses. After the original thatched clubhouse was destroyed by fire as a result of a storm, a new building was erected in 1921 near the junction of Faringdon Road and Oxford Road. After the Second World War, Frilford Heath House Estate and its woodland, which bordered the course, was put up for sale. Fearing the estate could be bought for development, the club purchased the property to avoid endangering the isolation the club enjoyed. The original country mansion, heavily restored, replaced the 1921 building and now serves as the clubhouse.

== Courses ==
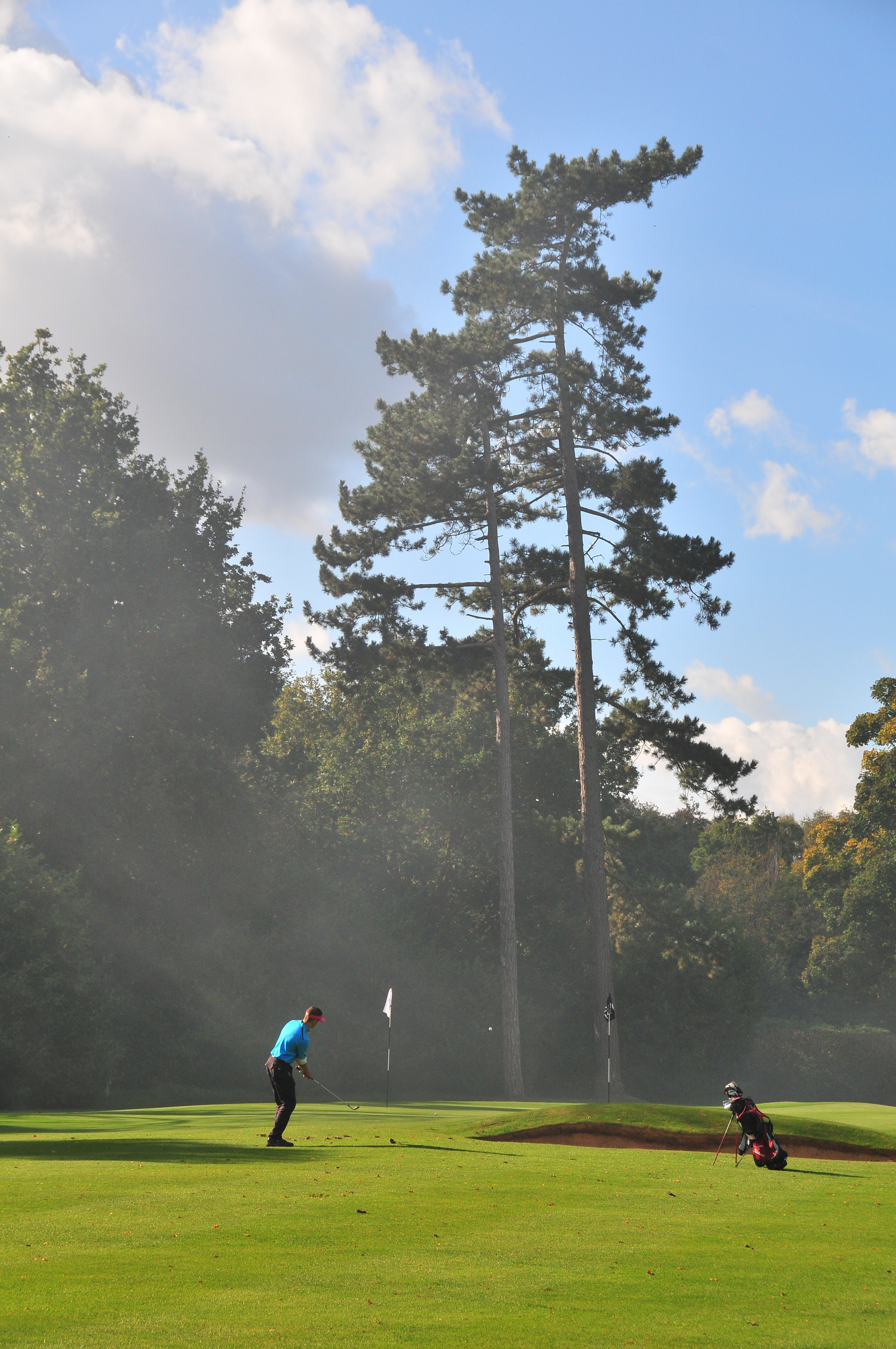
A PGA Pro plays to PowerPlay Golf's black flag at Frilford Heath Golf Club

=== Red Course ===
The earliest of Frilford Heath's three courses, the Red Course was designed by the Open Champion J.H. Taylor in 1908.

=== Green Course ===
The shortest of Frilford's golf courses, the 6,015 yard, par 69 Green Course was initially designed as a 9-hole course and was created by Frilford's first professional, J.H. Turner, to supplement the existing 18-hole Red Course. The course was extended in the years following the purchase of Frilford Heath House in 1964.

=== Blue Course ===
The club's latest addition is the 6,728 yard, par 72, Blue Course, designed in 1994 by Oxfordshire-based golf course architect Simon Gidman. The Blue Course was set out on an additional 169 acres of heathland purchased by the club in 1991.

== Site of Special Scientific Interest ==
Most of the club grounds are designated a Site of Special Scientific Interest as Frilford Heath, Ponds and Fens.
