= Kevin Phelan =

Irish golfer

Personal information
- Nationality: Ireland
- Born: 8 November 1990 (age 35) Waterford, Ireland
- Height: 6 ft 0 in (1.83 m)

Career
- Sport: Golf
- College: University of North Florida
- Turned professional: 2013
- Former tours: European Tour; Challenge Tour; Asian Tour; Asian Development Tour; Japan Challenge Tour

Best results in major championships
- Masters Tournament: DNP
- PGA Championship: DNP
- U.S. Open: T62: 2013
- The Open Championship: DNP

Kevin Phelan (born 8 November 1990) is an Irish professional golfer who finished T62nd at the 2013 U.S. Open.

== Career ==
Phelan was born in Waterford, Ireland and grew up in St. Augustine, Florida. He played college golf at the University of North Florida. He turned professional in September 2013.

Phelan finished T-17 at the European Tour Qualifying School to earn his 2014 European Tour card, after playing in all three stages.

== Results in major championships ==
Tournament	2010	2011	2012	2013
U.S. Open	CUT			T62

Note: Phelan only played in the U.S. Open.

Did not play

CUT = missed the half-way cut
"T" = tied

== Team appearances ==
Amateur

- Eisenhower Trophy (representing Ireland): 2010, 2012
- St Andrews Trophy (representing Great Britain & Ireland): 2012
- European Amateur Team Championship (representing Ireland): 2011, 2013
- Palmer Cup (representing Europe): 2013
- Walker Cup (representing Great Britain & Ireland): 2013

== See also ==
- 2013 European Tour Qualifying School graduates
