= Michael Lunt =

English golfer (1935–2007)

Personal information
- Full name: Michael Stanley Randle Lunt
- Nationality: England
- Born: 20 May 1935 Moseley, Birmingham, England
- Died: 22 May 2007 (aged 72) Surrey, England

Career
- Sport: Golf
- Status: Amateur

Michael Stanley Randle Lunt (20 May 1935 – 22 May 2007) was an English amateur golfer. He won the Amateur Championship in 1963 and played in the Walker Cup four times.

Lunt was the son of Stanley Lunt who won the English Amateur in 1934. Lunt himself won the English Amateur in 1966 and they became the first father and son to win the event. Lunt had a successful junior career, representing England boys and reaching the final of the Boys Amateur Championship in 1951. Against Neville Dunn, he was 5 up after 11 holes of the morning round but lost 6&5.

Individually his biggest success came when he won the Amateur Championship at St Andrews in 1963, beating John Blackwell 2&1 in the final. The following year he came close to repeating his success but lost in the final to Gordon Clark at the 39th hole.

Lunt was part of the Great Britain and Ireland team that won the 1964 Eisenhower Trophy at Olgiata Golf Club near Rome. He played in four successive Walker Cup matches from 1959 to 1965.

Lunt died suddenly from an aneurysm. At the time of his death, he was part of the way through his year as captain of The Royal and Ancient Golf Club of St Andrews.

== Amateur wins ==
- 1958 Golf Illustrated Gold Vase
- 1963 Amateur Championship
- 1966 English Amateur

== Team appearances ==
- Walker Cup (representing Great Britain & Ireland): 1959, 1961, 1963, 1965 (tied)
- Eisenhower Trophy (representing Great Britain & Ireland): 1964 (winners)
- Amateurs–Professionals Match (representing the Amateurs): 1958 (winners), 1959
- St Andrews Trophy (representing Great Britain & Ireland): 1958 (winners), 1960 (winners), 1964 (winners)
- Commonwealth Tournament (representing Great Britain): 1963
- European Amateur Team Championship (representing England): 1965
