= Formby Golf Club =

Golf club in Merseyside, England

Coordinates: 53.5690°N 3.0755°W

Formby Golf Club is a golf links in Formby, Merseyside, England.

== History ==
Founded in 1884, the course was redesigned by Willie Park Jr. in 1912. Over the years the course has undergone some changes, including some in 1922 by James Braid.

== Major tournaments hosted ==
The course has been the venue for a number of tournaments and competitions over the years, including the Curtis Cup in 2004 and The Amateur Championship in 1957, 1967, 1984, and 2009. It has also been used as a qualifying course for The Open Championship in 1924, 1971 and 1996. It hosted the Staysure PGA Seniors Championship in 2021 and 2022 as part of the European Senior Tour.
