= Jan Rube =

Swedish professional golfer (1952–2026)

Personal information
- Full name: Jan Olov Lennart Rube
- Nickname: Jonta
- Nationality: Sweden
- Born: April 14, 1952 Hässleholm, Sweden
- Died: 6 November 2025 (aged 73) Landskrona, Sweden
- Spouse: Siv Rube
- Children: 2

Career
- Sport: Golf
- College: United States International University – San Diego
- Turned professional: 1981

Achievements and awards
- Swedish Golfer of the Year: 1974

Jan Olov Lennart Rube (14 April 1952 – 6 November 2025) was a Swedish professional golfer, who was one of the best amateur players in Sweden in the 1970s.

== Early life ==
Rube was grandson of Swedish photographer Arthur Rube.

Rube began as a caddie at age 9 and learned golf in 1961 at Mölle Golf Club outside Höganäs in the province of Scania in the south of Sweden.

He came to represent Mölle Golf Club through the main part of his career, but switched to Rya Golf Club, situated outside Helsingborg, in 1979.

== Amateur career ==
Rube, at age 17, reached the final of the 1969 Swedish Junior Match-play Championship at Djursholm Golf Club in Stockholm.

He first represented Sweden at the 1970 European Youths' Team Championship, being part of the Swedish team, who successfully defended their championship from the year before.

In 1971, still a junior, Rube reached the final at the Swedish Matchplay Championship, losing with one hole over 36 holes at Örebro Golf Club against defending champion Hans Hedjerson.

In 1973, he won the Boyd Quaich Academic Championship at St Andrews, Scotland, scoring 285 over 72 holes at the Old Course, including an amateur course record of 66 in the second round, after never have seen the course before the practice round.

After winning the 1974 Swedish Matchplay Championship at Kalmar Golf Club, Rube was awarded the 1974 Swedish Golfer of the Year, male and female, professional and amateur.

In August 1975, Rube, together with Bob Bäckstedt, represented Sweden at Club El Rincon in Bogotà, Colombia, among 18 two-man nation teams, competing for the Coupa El Rincon over 72 holes stroke-play. The Swedish team finished second and Rube second individually on a score of 2-under par, five strokes behind winner Denis Watson, Rhodesia. The best amateur golf nations in the world were invited, but United States did not participate.

At college in America, Rube, together with fellow Swede Krister Kinell, in 1975–76 played for the United States International University in San Diego, California, becoming the first Swedes to play golf at a university in the United States.

Rube's greatest international achievements was two victories in the German International Amateur Stroke-play Championship, in Stuttgart in 1977 and in Hamburg in 1980.

During an 11-year period, from 1971 to 1981, he was the only player to represent Sweden at every European Amateur Team Championship and every amateur worlds, the Eisenhower Trophy. He represented Sweden five times at the Eisenhower Trophy, tied with Claes Jöhncke more times than any other Swedish male golfer. In 1976, at Penina Golf and Resort, Portugal, the Swedish team (with Rube, Hans Hedjerson, Mikael Sorling and Göran Lundqvist) finished an, at the time, all-time best 7th among 38 participating nations and Rube tied 21st individually. The same year, Rube was appointed, for the first of three appearances, to the Continent of Europe team to meet Great Britain and Ireland for the St Andrews Trophy at the Old Course, St Andrews, Scotland.

At the 1978 Eisenhower Trophy in Fiji, team Sweden finished a new all-time best 5th and Rube again tied 21st individually.

As an amateur, Rube made the cut at the Scandinavian Enterprise Open on the European Tour on two occasions, in 1977 at Drottningholm Golf Club finishing tied 47th with former U.S. Open winner Orville Moody and 1980 at Vasatorp Golf Club, finishing 66th.

Rube was ranked as the best Swedish amateur player of the year, by Svensk Golf, the official magazine of the Swedish Golf Federation, three times, in 1974, 1975 (tied with Hans Hedjerson) and 1980.

== Professional career ==
After a long and successful amateur career, Rube turned professional in the middle of 1981. He only played a few professional tournaments, finishing 6th in his pro debut at the 1981 Swedish PGA Championship, 16th at Eskilstuna Open and 5th at Ullna Golf Club on the Swedish pro circuit, before retiring from tournament golf at 29 years of age.

Rube was later reinstated as an amateur.

== Private life and death ==
Since 1999, Rube resided outside Glumslöv, between Helsingborg and Landskrona on the eastcoast of Scania county in southern Sweden.

After retiring from competitive golf in 1981, he practiced paragliding from cliffs near his home. He also continued to enjoy friendly golf at his three home clubs; Mölle Golf Club, Rya Golf Club and Wittsjö Golf Club.

Rube died on 6 November 2025 in Landskrona. He and his wife Siv had two children, Ann and Max, and four grandchildren.

== Awards and honors ==
- 1971 Most Promising Golfer in Sweden by Zindermans Publishing House
- 1973 Helsingborgs Dagblad Gold medal for best sports achievement of the year in the North-west of Scania
- 1974 Swedish Golfer of the Year
- 1975 Elit Sign No. 54 by Swedish Golf Federation
- Honorary member of Mölle Golf Club

== Amateur wins ==
- 1973 Mölle Open, Boyd Quaich Academic Championship at St Andrews
- 1974 Swedish Matchplay Championship, Martini Cup (Rya GC), Guldpokalen (Båstad GC), Falsterbohus Pierre Robert Cup (Falsterbo GC)
- 1975 Falsterbohus Pierre Robert Cup (Falsterbo GC), Tom's Pokal (Ljunghusen GC), Omegaslaget Rya Foursome Open (with Johnny Andersson)
- 1976 Swedish International Stroke Play Championship, Guldpokalen (Båstad GC)
- 1977 German International Amateur Stroke-play Championship, Guldpokalen (Båstad GC), Falkenberg Open, DFDS Elite (Ljunghusen GC)
- 1978 Grundig Satellit Cup (Flommen GC), Ingarö Masters
- 1979 Kvällsposten Masters (Bokskogen GC), Ingarö Masters
- 1980 German International Amateur Stroke-play Championship, Swedish International Stroke Play Championship, Ingarö Masters
- 1981 Betaslaget (Perstorp GC)

== Team appearances ==
Amateur

- European Youths' Team Championship (representing Sweden): 1970 (winners), 1971, 1972, 1973
- European Amateur Team Championship (representing Sweden): 1971, 1973, 1975, 1977, 1979, 1981
- EGA Trophy (representing the Continent of Europe): 1972, 1973
- Eisenhower Trophy (representing Sweden): 1972, 1974, 1976, 1978, 1980
- Copa El Rincon, Colombia (representing Sweden): 1975
- St Andrews Trophy (representing Continent of Europe): 1976, 1978, 1980
