= Krister Kinell =

Swedish professional golfer (1953–2019)

Personal information
- Nationality: Sweden
- Born: 24 September 1953 Linköping, Sweden
- Died: 13 February 2019 (aged 65)
- Height: 1.75 m (5 ft 9 in)

Career
- Sport: Golf
- College: United States International University – San Diego
- Turned professional: 1982
- Former tour: European Tour
- Professional wins: 1

Best results in major championships
- Masters Tournament: DNP
- PGA Championship: DNP
- U.S. Open: DNP
- The Open Championship: CUT: 1985

Achievements and awards
- Swedish Golfer of the Year: 1981

Krister Kinell (24 September 1953 – 13 February 2019) was a Swedish professional golfer and one of the first Swedish golfers to play on the European Tour. He was awarded the 1981 Swedish Golfer of the Year.

== Amateur career ==
Kinell reached the final in the 1973 Swedish Junior Match-play Championship, losing on the fourth extra hole in the 36-hole match, on his home course Linköping Golf Club, against his club mate, long time friend and competitor, Bob Bäckstedt. Kinell reached the final again in 1975, losing 4 and 2 against Peter Lindwall, coincidentally also representing Linköping GC.

At college in America, Kinell, together with fellow Swede Jan Rube, in 1975-76 played for the United States International University in San Diego, California, becoming the first Swedes to play golf at a University in the United States.

Kinell and his brother Claes finished second at the 1976 Swedish Foursome Championship, over 72 holes stroke-play at Viksjö Golf Club, losing with one stroke, when the winning couple chipped in for an eagle on the very last hole.

Reaching the final but not winning, was his destiny in the Swedish Match-play Championship too, losing 2 and 1 to Mikael Sorling at Borås Golf Club in 1978.

Kinell made an international breakthrough when he won individually at the 1978 Fiat Trophy in Turin, Italy on his 25th birthday, over 54 holes against competitors from 17 European countries.

He was part of the Swedish teams, earning silver medals at the 1973, 1974 and 1975 European Youths' Team Championship, and again at the 1977 European Amateur Team Championship. He represented the Continent of Europe, winning the 1982 St Andrews Trophy against Great Britain and Ireland 14–11.

In 1980, Kinell earned Elite Sign No. 65 by the Swedish Golf Federation, on the basis of national team appearances and national championship performances.

While still an amateur, Kinell reached a high finish at the 1982 Scandinavian Enterprise Open on the European Tour, at his home course. After the first round Kinell was tied 4th alongside Seve Ballesteros, two strokes off the lead. Kinell finished the tournament tied 8th. He was best Swedish player and best amateur, just as the year before, when he was tied 23rd. His tied 8th finish in 1982, was at the time the best ever by a Swedish player on the European Tour.

He was a member of the Swedish team, along with Ove Sellberg, Per Andersson and Magnus Persson, finishing tied second at the 1982 Eisenhower Trophy in Lausanne, Switzerland, in September. Persson made a four feet birdie putt on his 72nd hole to give Sweden a silver medal, shared with Japan, seven strokes behind United States, with Kinell finishing tied third and top European in the individual competition.

Kinell was ranked the 1982 best Swedish amateur player by Svensk Golf, the official magazine of the Swedish Golf Federation.

== Professional career ==
Kinell turned professional at the end of the 1982 season, at the age of 29. A sponsor agreement with Saab AB made it possible for Kinell and two of his teammates from the 1982 Eisenhower Trophy, Ove Sellberg and Magnus Persson, to compete professionally, forming Team Saab, granted financial and management support. This marked the beginning of a break-through for Sweden in professional golf. Less than four years later, Sellberg secured the first European Tour victory by a Swedish born player at the 1986 Epson Grand Prix of Europe Matchplay Championship.

Kinell's best year in the paid ranks came in 1984, when he reached his best European Tour finish, tied 4th at the 1984 Tournament Players Championship at St Mellion International Resort, Cornwall, England. Kinell shot 63 in the third round, the joint low round of the tournament, equaled by Bernhard Langer in the fourth round. Kinell's 4th place was again the best ever by a Swedish player on the European Tour. He finished the year ranked 96th on the European Tour Order of Merit.

The same year, Kinell was playing captain for the Swedish team with Anders Forsbrand, Magnus Persson and Ove Sellberg at the Hennessy Cognac Cup.

After his playing career, Kinell worked as a club pro at Landeryd Golf Club, situated outside Linköping, and won the Swedish PGA Club Pro Championship at Båstad Golf Club in 1991. The victory was shared with Gunnar Mueller, since darkness made it impossible to play further playoff holes after three shared extra holes.

== Personal life, death ==
Kinell graduated from the Swedish School of Sport and Health Sciences in Stockholm, but lived most of his life in his home town of Linköping, where he worked as a teacher before his professional golf career. After retiring from golf instructing in later life, he worked as an insurance agent.

He was married to Cajsa and they had two children.

He died from cancer on 13 February 2019.

== Amateur wins ==
- 1971 Lunds Vårtest
- 1975 Lunds Vårtest, Edgars Cup (Karlstad GC, Sweden)
- 1976 Flygt Trophy (Kalmar GC, Sweden) (with Hillevi Hagström)
- 1977 Lunds Vårtest
- 1978 Fiat Trophy (Turin, Italy), Martini Cup (Rya GC, Sweden)

== Professional wins (1) ==
No.	Date	Tournament	Winning score	To par	Margin of victory	Runner-up
1	20 Sep 1991	Swedish PGA Club Pro Championship^{1}	222	+4	Shared with (Sweden) Gunnar Mueller	

^{1}Due to weather, ended in tie after three-hole playoff

== Results in major championships ==
Tournament	1985
The Open Championship	CUT

Note: Kinell only played in The Open Championship.
CUT = missed the half-way cut

== Team appearances ==
Amateur

- Copa America (representing Sweden): 1973
- European Youths' Team Championship (representing Sweden): 1973, 1974, 1975
- EGA Trophy (representing the Continent of Europe): 1974, 1975
- European Amateur Team Championship (representing Sweden): 1977, 1979, 1981
- Flygt Trophy (representing Sweden): 1976 (winners)
- St Andrews Trophy (representing the Continent of Europe): 1982 (winners)
- Eisenhower Trophy (representing Sweden): 1982

Professional

- Hennessy Cognac Cup (representing Sweden): 1984
