= Gunnar Mueller =

Swedish professional golfer (born 1948)

Personal information
- Full name: Folke Gunnar Mueller
- Nationality: Sweden
- Born: 5 January 1948 (age 78) Sweden

Career
- Sport: Golf
- Turned professional: 1973
- Former tours: European Tour; Asian Golf Circuit
- Professional wins: 5

Best results in major championships
- Masters Tournament: DNP
- PGA Championship: DNP
- U.S. Open: DNP
- The Open Championship: 60th: 1973

Achievements and awards
- Swedish Golfer of the Year: 1971

Folke Gunnar Mueller (born 5 January 1948) is a Swedish professional golfer, who formerly played on the European Tour and the Asian Golf Circuit. He was the first Swedish player to qualify for all four rounds in The Open Championship.

== Early life and amateur career ==
Born on 5 January 1948, Mueller started playing golf in 1962, at 14 years of age, at Lund Academic Golf Club, after his family had moved from Tranemo to Malmö. Five years later, he owned the course record at Lund AGC.

As an amateur, Mueller won the Swedish National Junior Championship and represented Sweden both on junior level and in the European Amateur Team Championship. He was part of the Swedish team winning the 1969 European Youths' Team Championship. Still an amateur in 1970, he finished 35th in a professional tournament, the Dutch Open. He won one of the three major amateur tournaments at the time in Sweden, the 1971 Scandinavian International Match Play Championship, beating Henry Knudsen, Denmark in the final 4 and 3.

== Professional career ==
Turning professional after the 1972 season, Mueller was one of the first Swedish born full-time touring professionals and played both on the Asian Golf Circuit and the European Tour. He was also first Swedish player to qualify for all four rounds in The Open Championship, an achievement reached in 1973, at Royal Troon Golf Club, Scotland.

Mueller played 82 tournaments on the European Tour 1973–1981, with a best finish of tied 14th in the 1976 Italian Open. In 1976, he played 10 tournaments on the European Tour and made the cut in nine of them, to finish a career best 87th on the Order of Merit.

Mueller represented Sweden twice in the World Cup and achieved some success. In 1975 in Bangkok, Thailand, his second round 68, was best in the field and in 1978 in Honolulu, Hawaii, he finished tied 5th in the individual competition and tied 14th (with Hans Hedjerson) in the team event. At the time, this was by far the best Swedish individual and team performances in the history of the World Cup.

Mueller won the Swedish PGA Championship four times. After his last of those victories, in the fall of 1981, he retired from international competition and begun a career as a club pro, at Österlen Golf Club in southern Sweden, the following season. He led the final Swedish PGA Order of Merit in 1981, but did not play in the World Cup that year, as there was no tournament for the first time since its inauguration in 1953.

After the start of the Swedish Golf Tour in 1984, Mueller played a few tournaments in his home country, with a best finish of 2nd at the 1985 Gevalia Open in Gävle.

In 1991, Mueller won the Swedish PGA Club Pro Championship at Båstad Golf Club. The title was shared with Krister Kinell as no play-off was played due to darkness.

In 2019, Mueller, shooting his age of 71 in one round, won the club championship at Österlen Golf Club, 53 years after he won the same title for the first time, in 1966. First time Mueller scored his age over 18 holes, was at Viken Golf Club outside Helsingborg, Sweden, in 2009 when he was 61 years old.

== Awards, honors ==
As an amateur, Mueller was awarded Swedish Golfer of the Year, male and female, amateur and professional, in 1971.

Being a Swedish and Scandinavian pioneer, during a time before, later coming increase of prize money, his efforts to compete on the professional golf circuits is regarded as important inspiration for later generations of Swedish golfers and their successes around the world. In the book, celebrating the 75-year anniversary of the Swedish Golf Federation in 1979, he was, by the editor, pointed out as one of Sweden's best male golfers ever. At the opening of the Swedish Golf Museum in June 2000, he was one of ten players, among names as Annika Sörenstam and Jesper Parnevik, presented as important in the history of Swedish golf.

In 1999, he received The Merit Sign in Gold by the PGA of Sweden and was appointed Swedish PGA professional of the century by the magazine "Tournytt" (Tour News).

At the 100th anniversary of the Swedish Golf Federation in 2004, Mueller was, by the Svensk Golf magazine, ranked 14th among the 100 most important persons in the history of Swedish golf.

== Amateur wins ==
- 1968 Swedish Junior Matchplay Championship, Lunds Vårtest
- 1969 Landskrona 36 holes, Rya Foursome (with Michael Örtegren)
- 1970 Lunds Vårtest, Scandinavian Foursome (with Michael Öretgren)
- 1971 Scandinavian International Matchplay Championship
- 1972 Lunds Vårtest, Falsterbohus PR Cup, Torsten Hernod Memorial (Lidingö GC)

== Professional wins (6) ==
=== Other wins (6) ===
| No. | Date | Tournament | Winning score | Margin of victory | Runner(s)-up |
|---|---|---|---|---|---|
| 1 | 17 Jun 1973 | Flygt Open | +10 (77-74-71-76=298) | 1 stroke | (England) John Byard |
| 2 | 31 Aug 1975 | Swedish PGA Championship | +2 (72-71-70-69=282) | 6 strokes | (Sweden) Thure Holmström, (England) Keith Preston |
| 3 | 16 Sep 1978 | Swedish PGA Championship (2) | +9 (74-78-72-73=297) | Playoff | (Sweden) Hans Hedjerson |
| 4 | 1 Sep 1979 | Swedish PGA Championship (3) | +11 (76-76-75-72=299) | 4 strokes | (Sweden) Ingemar Christersson |
| 5 | 8 Aug 1981 | Swedish PGA Championship (4) | +5 (73-69-75-76=293) | 3 strokes | (England) Jason Barber |
| 6 | 20 Sep 1991 | Swedish PGA Club Pro Championship | +4 (222) | Shared title with (Sweden) Krister Kinell | |

== Team appearances ==
Amateur

- European Youths' Team Championship (representing Sweden): 1967, 1968, 1969 (winners)
- EGA Trophy (representing the Continent of Europe): 1968
- European Amateur Team Championship (representing Sweden): 1971
- Copa America (representing Sweden): 1972

Professional

- Philip Morris International (representing Sweden): 1975
- World Cup (representing Sweden): 1975, 1978
