= Bro Hof Slott Golf Club =

Golf course in Upplands-Bro, Sweden

Coordinates: 59.49557°N 17.62580°E

- Location in Sweden Location in Stockholm

Club information
- Location: Upplands-Bro, Stockholm County, Sweden
- Established: 2002
- Type: Private
- Total holes: 36
- Tournaments: Scandinavian Masters, 2010–2013, 2016
- Website: Bro Hof Slott Golf Club

The Stadium Course
- Designer: Robert Trent Jones, Jr.
- Par: 72
- Length: 7,357 metres (8,046 yards)
- Course record: Black tee: 62 Vincent Norrman (2022)

The Castle Course
- Designer: Robert Trent Jones, Jr.
- Par: 72
- Length: 6,133 metres (6,707 yards)
- Course record: White tee: 62 Kristoffer Broberg

Bro Hof Slott Golf Club is a golf club, with two golf courses located in Upplands-Bro, Sweden, northwest of the city of Stockholm. Both courses are ranked among the best courses in the country.

== History ==
Bro Hof Slott Golf Club was initiated and mainly financed by Björn Öros, who baught the property in 2002. His intention was to build a high-quality championship course, able to host professional tournaments.

The manor house was built in 1888 in the Baroque style. The property was mainly used for agricultural purpose. In 2004, the municipality of Upplands-Bro decided that the property was allowed to be used as a golf course and for hotel business.

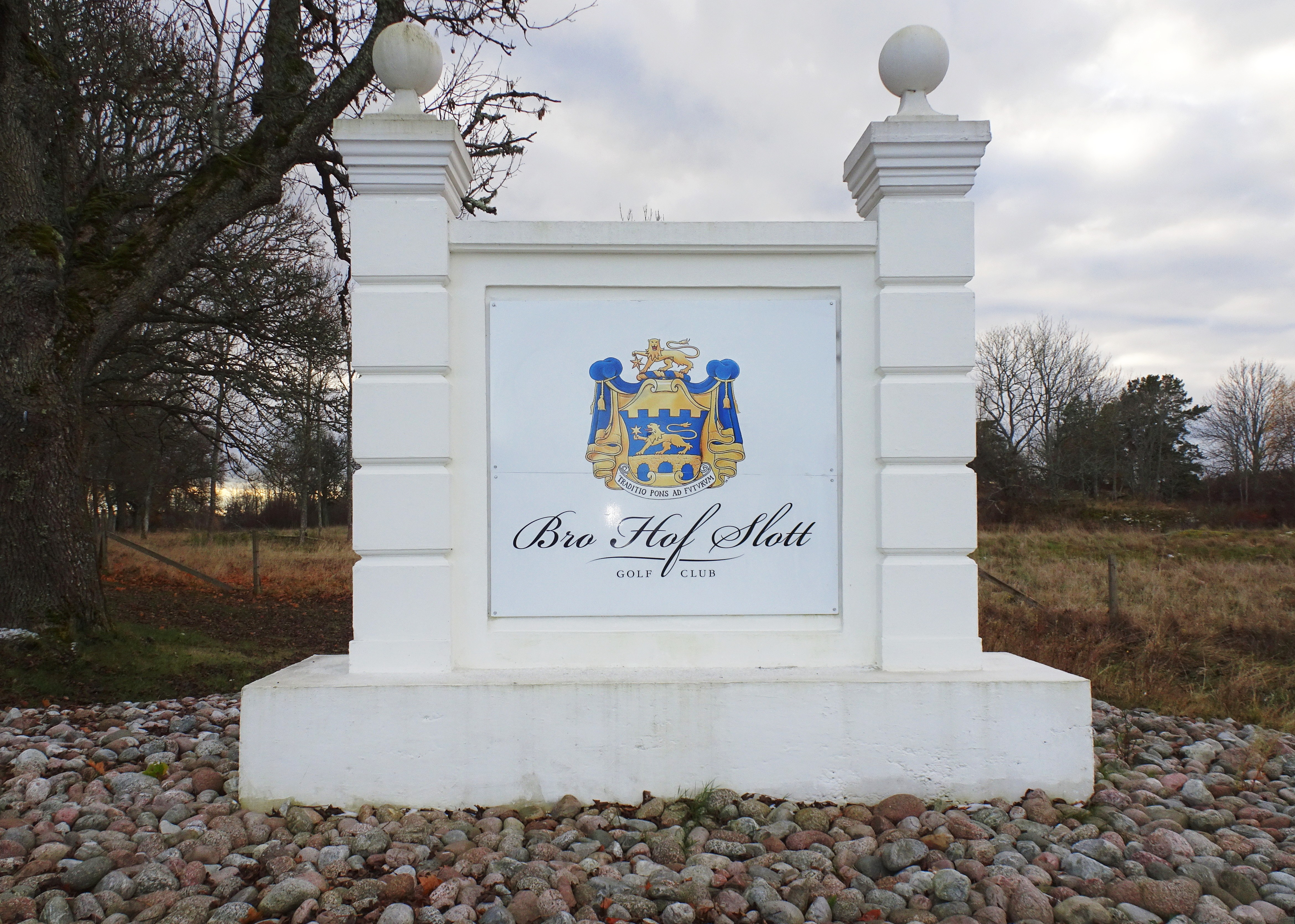
Entrence sign to Bro Hof Slott Golf Club in 2016

At the time of building the first golf course, the manor house was totally renovated and named The Bro Hof Castle. A club badge was created, including a coat of arms showing a lion on a bridge ahead of a wall illustrating the name. There is also a written motto in Latin, "traditio pons ad futurum", meaning "tradition is the bridge to the future".

The facilities was inaugurated in 2006. The Stadium Course was opened the following year and the Castle Coiurse two years later.

Beside the two 18-hole courses, there is a drivingrange of 5,000 squaremeters with grass tees, five putting greens and, for members, a shortgame area with three practice greens. There is also an 18-hole putting course covering 12,000 square meters featuring green-grass with 18 internal greens, tee markers and numbered flags, demanding putts up to 40 meters.

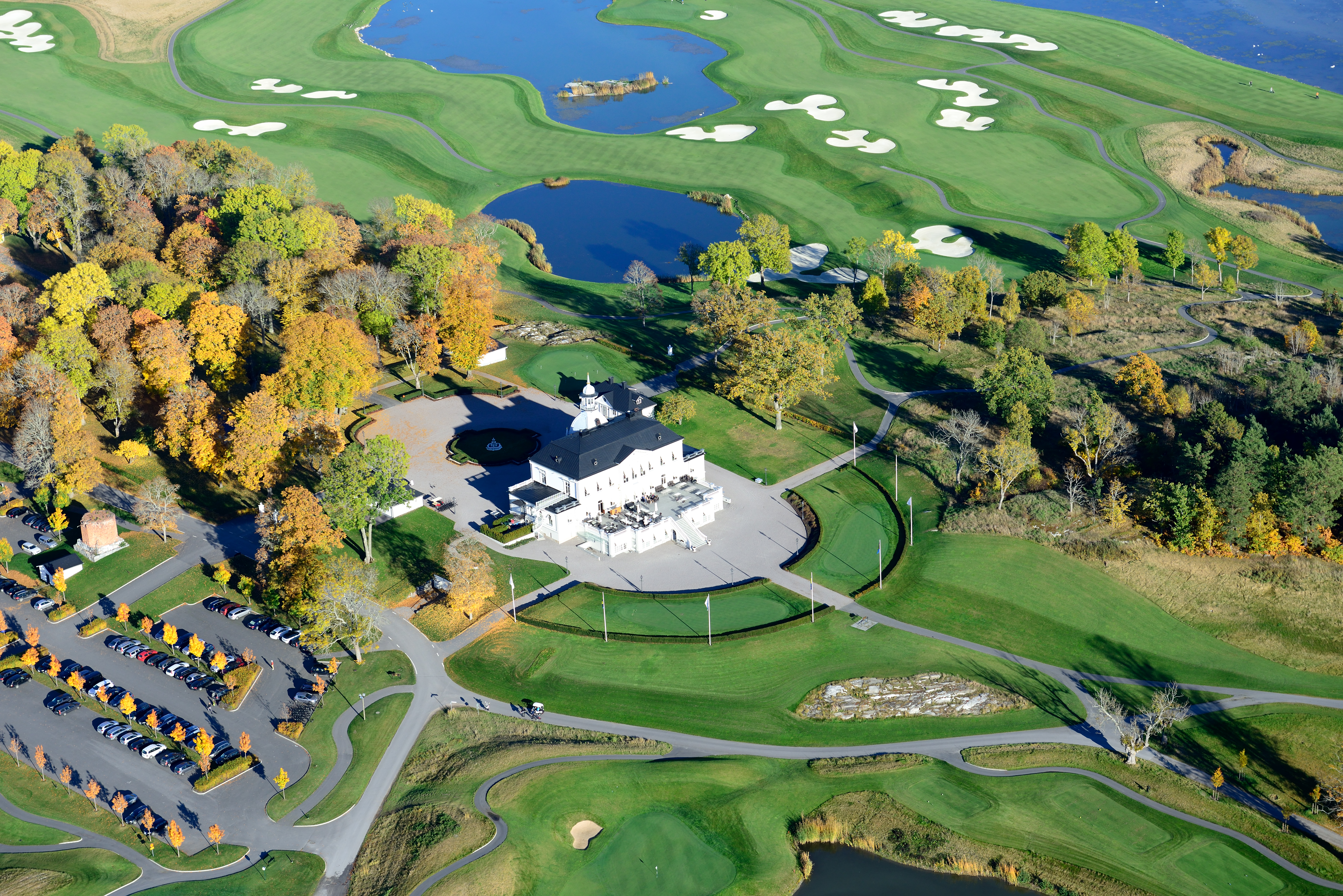
Bro Hof Slott Golf Club, castle and part of golf course

== Courses ==
Both 18-hole courses are designed by Robert Trent Jones, Jr.

=== The Stadium Course ===
The Stadium Course opened in 2007 and is considered one of the longest golf courses in Europe at 7,357 metres (8,046 yards). The course streches alongside the lake Mälaren and water comes into play on eleven holes, mainly on the last four holes.

The Nordea Masters, at the time an annual event on the PGA European Tour, was hosted at the venue from 2010 through 2016, except for 2014 and 2015.

In 2020, The Stadium Course was ranked as the second best golf course in Sweden by Svensk Golf magazine.

In 2026, the course was ranked as the best golf course in Sweden and the fifth best course in Continental Europe by Golf Digest magazine. With this ranking, the course defended its position from previous rankings by the magazine. Certain attributes of the course were highlighted, such as its length, presence of wind, and the overall environment.

The 17th, which is the shortest par 3-hole on the course, has an island green with sharp edges, needing a carry of around 140 meters from the black tee. During the last round of the 2011 Nordea Masters tournament on the European Tour, strong winds made the 17th hole even more challenging than usual and several double-figure scores on the hole and 19 last-round-scores in the 80s and 90s were noted by the tour professionals.

In 2019, the course was announced as the inaugural host of a new event, the Scandinavian Mixed, which would see men and women competing against one another for the same prize money. The first event was originally scheduled to take place in June 2020, however it was cancelled like many other events at the time, due to the COVID-19 pandemic.

==== Scorecard ====
Hole	1	2	3	4	5	6	7	8	9	Out	10	11	12	13	14	15	16	17	18	In	Total
Meters	578	445	395	219	468	472	228	451	581	3,837	430	191	525	565	416	569	238	150	373	3,457	7,294
Par	5	4	4	3	4	4	3	4	5	36	4	3	5	5	4	5	3	3	4	36	72

Lenghts from diffent tees:

- Black: 7,294 meters
- White: 6,646 meters
- Yellow: 5,744 meters
- Blue: 5,541 meters
- Red: 4,710 meters

=== The Castle Course ===
The Castle Course opened in the middle of 2010. It has elements of a links course. There are much less water coming into play than on the Stadium Course and in general smallere bunkers, but narrower fairways.

In 2020, The Castle Course was ranked as the 14th best golf course in Sweden by Svensk Golf magazine.

== Tournaments hosted ==
=== Professional tournaments ===
Year	Tour	Men (M) / Women (W)	Tournament	Winner	Ref.
2010	EUR	M	Nordea Scandinavian Masters	(Sweden) Richard S. Johnson	
2011	EUR	M	Nordea Masters	(Sweden) Alex Norén	
2012	EUR	M	Nordea Masters	(England) Lee Westwood	
2013	EUR	M	Nordea Masters	(Finland) Mikko Ilonen	
2016	EUR	M	Nordea Masters	(England) Matt Fitzpatrick	
