= Hans Hedjerson =

Swedish professional golfer

Personal information
- Full name: Hans Göran Hedjerson
- Nickname: Hasse
- Nationality: Sweden
- Born: 3 November 1943 (age 82) Stockholm, Sweden
- Spouse: Eva Guggenheimer Hedjerson
- Children: 2

Career
- Sport: Golf
- Turned professional: 1977
- Former tour: Swedish Golf Tour
- Professional wins: 3

Achievements and awards
- Swedish Golfer of the Year: 1970, 1973, 1976

Hans Göran Hedjerson (born 3 November 1943) is a Swedish professional golfer, who was one of the best amateur players in Sweden in the 1960s and 1970s.

== Early life ==
Hedjerson was born in a family with a lot of sport background. His father was the 1937, and very first, Swedish alpine skiing and slalom champion, Harald Hedjerson (1913–1966), who also competed in the 1936 Winter Olympics in Nordic combined skiing. His grandfather was the 1910, and very first, Swedish Nordic skiing, 30 kilometer, champion, Adolf Hedjerson (1881–1961). Naturally, Hedjerson practiced many sports at young age, such as tennis, ice hockey and, like his father, alpine skiing and ski jumping.

He did not start playing golf until the age of 16, but reached a handicap of 4 during his first full year 1960, the next year represented his country and the Continent of Europe on youth up-to-18 level and within three years was part of winning the European Youths' Team Championship for Sweden. He started to play, inspired by his oldest sisters husband and elite golfer, Staffan Westman, at Saltsjöbaden Golf Club, situated outside Stockholm, Sweden, but later came to represent nearby Lidingö Golf Club and from 1967 and during the main part of his career, Wermdö Golf & Country Club.

== Amateur career ==
Within less than six years after hitting his first golf shot, Hedjerson reached the final of the Swedish Match-play Championship. He lost the 36-hole match to Johan Jöhncke, on the third extra hole in 1965, but a few years later he won the championship two years in a row.

Hedjerson ran his own glazing company at the same time as playing international elite amateur golf. He was one of the dominating male amateur golfers in Sweden in the 1960s and early 1970s and won all three major Swedish amateur tournaments at the time, at least once. He also won the open amateur championships of Spain and Germany. In 1975, he was close to win the Spanish International Amateur Championship for the third time in a row, but lost in the final. The same year, at one of his few visits for individual competition on the British isles, he finished 9th at the Golf Illustrated Gold Vase at Walton Heath Golf Club, six strokes behind winner Michael Bonallack.

He represented Sweden four times at the amateur worlds, the Eisenhower Trophy. In 1976, at Penina Golf and Resort, Portugal, the Swedish team (with Hedjerson, Jan Rube, Mikael Sorling and Göran Lundqvist) finished an, at the time, all-time best 7th among 38 participating nations, with Hedjerson as best Swede, placed 16th individually. Hedjerson finished as best Swedish player at the Eisenhower Trophy in both 1970 and 1974 as well. For the 1968 Eisenhower Trophy in Melbourne, Australia, during the beginning of the peak in Hedjerson's amateur career, the Swedish Golf Federation decided to not send a team. However, Hedjerson in 1968 was appointed, for the first of three appearances, to the Continent of Europe team to meet Great Britain and Ireland for the St Andrews Trophy at Portmarnock Golf Club, Ireland.

His last year as an amateur, Hedjerson finished tied 40th and best Swedish player at the 1976 Scandinavian Enterprise Open on the European Tour at Royal Drottningholm Golf Club outside Stockholm, Sweden.

== Professional career ==
After a long and successful amateur career, Hedjerson turned professional ahead of the 1977 season, at 33 years of age. Running his own import company for golf equipment at the same time as playing, his intended tournament schedule was restricted.

His first year as a pro, Hedjerson won the Swedish PGA Championship and finished second in both Flygt Open at Viksjö GC and Umeå Prefab Hus Open at Eskilstuna GC. He qualified for the 1977 Swedish World Cup team, together with Jan Sonnevi, to play in Manila, Philippines, in December. Unfortunately, Hedjerson became ill during the World Cup tournament and could not perform at his best. The Swedish team finished tied 23rd among 50 nations.

Hedjerson represented Sweden one more time in the World Cup, in 1978 in Honolulu, Hawaii, were the team (with Hedjerson and Gunnar Mueller) finished tied 14th. At the time, this was by far the best Swedish team performance in the history of the World Cup.

Hedjerson lost in a playoff to Gunnar Mueller at the 1978 Swedish PGA Championship, in trying to defend his title, but won another title on the Swedish pro tour in 1978, the Flygt Open at Viksjö Golf Club, where he finished second the year before.

He made the cut at the Scandinavian Enterprise Open on the European Tour at two occasions as a professional, in 1979 and 1980, both times at Vasatorp Golf Club, outside Helsingborg, Sweden.

When the Swedish Golf Tour officially started in 1984, with more tournaments and more money to play for than before in Sweden, Hedjersons competitive career was over.

In 1982, Hedjerson made his 13th career hole-in-one, by holing his tee shot on the 280-meter par-4 10th hole at Djursholm Golf Club, Stockholm.

== Awards, honors ==
In 1967, seven years after start playing, Hedjerson earned Elite Sign No. 45 by the Swedish Golf Federation, on the basis of national team appearances and national championship performances.

Hedjerson was awarded Swedish Golfer of the Year, male and female, professional and amateur, three times as an amateur. Before he received the award for the third time in 1976, there was a rule stating that a player not could be awarded more than two times.

Hedjerson was ranked the best Swedish amateur player by Svensk Golf, the official magazine of the Swedish Golf Federation, in 1973, 1975 (tied with Jan Rube) and 1976. 1973 was the first year the ranking took place.

== Amateur wins ==
- 1966 Martini Cup (Rya GC)
- 1967 Chrysantemumbålen (Stockholm GC)
- 1968 Torsten Hèrnod Memorial (Lidingö GC), Slottspokalen (Uppsala GC)
- 1969 Martini Cup (Rya GC)
- 1970 Swedish Match-play Championship, Swedish International Stroke Play Championship
- 1971 Swedish Match-play Championship, Torsten Hèrnod Memorial (Lidingö GC)
- 1973 Spanish International Amateur Championship, Scandinavian Foursome (with Gösta Ignell), Grundig Sattelit Cup (Flommen GC), Torsten Hèrnod Memorial (Lidingö GC), Falkenberg Open
- 1974 Scandinavian International Match-play Championship, Spanish International Amateur Championship, Torsten Hèrnod Memorial (Lidingö GC)
- 1975 Swedish International Stroke Play Championship, Chrysantemumbålen (Stockholm GC)
- 1976 German International Amateur Stroke-play Championship, Scandinavian Foursome (with Gösta Ignell)

== Professional wins (3) ==
=== Swedish wins (3) ===
No.	Date	Tournament	Winning score	To par	Margin of victory	Runner(s)-up
1	7 Jun 1977	Svensk Golf Marathon Invitation	74-71-70-77=292	+8	2 strokes	(Sweden) Bob Bäckstedt, (Sweden) Göran Lundqvist
2	10 Sep 1977	Swedish PGA Championship	72-73-72-74=291	+3	4 strokes	(England) John Cockin
3	11 Jun 1978	Flygt Open	74-75-77-77=303	+15	Playoff	(England) John Cockin

== Team appearances ==
Amateur

- Jacques Léglise Trophy (representing Continent of Europe): 1961
- European Youths' Team Championship (representing Sweden): 1963 (winners), 1964
- European Amateur Team Championship (representing Sweden): 1967, 1969, 1971, 1973, 1975
- Eisenhower Trophy (representing Sweden): 1966, 1970, 1974, 1976
- St Andrews Trophy (representing Continent of Europe): 1968, 1970, 1976

Professional

- World Cup (representing Sweden): 1977, 1978
