= 1977 European Amateur Team Championship =

Golf competition

Tournament information
- Dates: 22–26 June 1977
- Location: The Hague, Netherlands; 52°07′52″N 04°21′43″E
- Course: Royal the Hague Golf & Country Club
- Organized by: European Golf Association
- Format: Qualification round: 36 holes stroke play Knock-out match-play

Statistics
- Par: 72
- Length: 6,686 yards (6,114 m)
- Field: 16 teams 96 players

Champion
- Scotland; Allan Brodie, Iain Carslaw; Charlie Green, Ian Hutcheon; Steve Martin, Gordon Murray
- Qualification round: 750 (+30); Final match: 5–2
- Location in Europe Location in The Netherlands

The 1977 European Amateur Team Championship took place 22–26 June at Royal The Hague Golf & Country Club in Wassenaar, Netherlands. It was the tenth men's golf European Amateur Team Championship.

== Venue ==
The course, situated in an undulating dune landscape in Wassenaar, 10 kilometres north of the city center of The Hague, Netherlands, was designed in 1938, by Harry Colt and C.H. Alison.

The championship course was set up with par 72.

== Format ==
Each team consisted of 6 players, playing two rounds of stroke-play over two days, counting the five best scores each day for each team.

The eight best teams formed flight A, in knock-out match-play over the next three days. The teams were seeded based on their positions after the stroke play. The first placed team were drawn to play the quarter-final against the eight placed team, the second against the seventh, the third against the sixth and the fourth against the fifth. Teams were allowed to use six players during the team matches, selecting four of them in the two morning foursome games and five players in to the afternoon single games. Games all square at the 18th hole were declared halved, if the team match was already decided.

The eight teams placed 9–16 in the qualification stroke-play formed flight B, to play similar knock-out play to decide their final positions.

== Teams ==
16 nation teams contested the event. Each team consisted of six players.

Country	Players
Austria	Uli Berlinger, Johann Lamberg, Max Lamberg, Franz Lamier, Klaus Nierlich, Fritz Porstendorfer
Belgium	John Bigwood, B. Chaput, Benoit Dumont, Freddy Rodesch, Jean Rolin, R. de Vooght
Denmark	Kjeld Friche, Hans Jacobsen, Henry Knudsen, Jan Lindberg, John Nielsen, Hans Sternderup
England	John Davies, Paul Downes, Peter Hedges, Michael Kelley, Sandy Lyle, Peter McEvoy
France	Sven Boinet, Marc Farry, Michel Gayon, Alexis Godillot, Tim Planchin, Philippe Ploujoux
Ireland	Declan Branigan, John Dickson, Brian Hoey, Liam McNamara, Paddy O'Boyle, Denis O'Sullivan
Italy	Carlo Acutis, Angelo Croze, Franco Gigliarelli, Antonio Lionello, A. Schiaffino, Lorenzo Silva
Netherlands	Carel Braun, Barend van Dam, G. van Dam, Bart Nolte, Jaap van Neck, Victor Swane
Norway	Erik Dønnestad, Ole-Christian. Hammer, Johan Horn, Asbjörn Ramnefjell, Tore Sviland, Alexander Vik
Portugal	Rodrico M. Bivar, A, Dantas, J. Figuireido, José Lara de Sousa e Melo, J. Santos, R. Soares,
Scotland	Allan Brodie, Iain Carslaw, Charlie Green, Ian Hutcheon, Steve Martin, Gordon Murray
Spain	Gonzaga Escauriaza, Santiago Fernández, Luis Gabarda, José Gancedo, Nicasio Sagardia, Román Taya
Sweden	Jan Andhagen, Bob Bäckstedt, Krister Kinell, Göran Lundqvist, Jan Rube, Mikael Sorling
Switzerland	Martin Frank, Yves Hofstetter, Martin Kessler, René Kessler, Michel Rey, Johnny Storjohann, Roberto Valsiangiancomo
Wales	John Jermine, David McLean, Terry Melia, Jeff Toye, John Povall, David Stevens
West Germany	Kai Flint, Freidrich Janssen, Christoph Kilian, Jan Müller, Veit Pagel, Christian Strenger

== Winners ==
Defending champions Scotland won the gold medal, earning their second title, in their fourth consecutive final beating Sweden 5–2. Scottish team member Ian Hurcheon, individual leader at the previous championship two years ago as well as at the 1976 Eisenhower Trophy, did not play in the final because of an injury.

Team France, earned the bronze on third place, after beating Denmark 5–2 in the bronze match.

There was no official award for the lowest individual score in the opening 36-hole stroke-play qualifying competition, but individual leader was Peter McEvoy, England, with a score of 4-under-par 140, four strokes ahead of nearest competitor. He scored the only sub-70-round of the first day, carding a 69. In the match-play rounds in flight A, McEvoy won all his five games.

The best score of the second round belonged to Jan Lindberg, Denmark, also scoring a 3-under-par 69 round.

Future professional two-time major winner, Sandy Lyle, at 19 years of age, represented England and finished tied 7th individually.

Fritz Porstendorfer, team Austria, made a hole-in-one on the 12th hole.

== Results ==
Qualification round

Team standings

Place	Country	Score	To par
1	England	366-377=743	+23
2	Scotland	373-377=750	+30
3	Denmark	388-375=763	+43
T4	France *	380-389=769	+49
T4	West Germany	394-375=769	+49
6	Italy	386-385=771	+51
7	Switzerland	384-388=772	+52
T8	Sweden *	392-383=775	+55
T8	Wales	384-391=775	+55
10	Ireland	392-385=777	+57
T11	Norway *	395-385=780	+60
T11	Spain	395-385=780	+60
13	Netherlands	399-388=787	+67
14	Austria	415-391=806	+86
15	Belgium	410-404=814	+94
16	Portugal	418-413=831	+111

* Note: In the event of a tie the order was determined by the best total of the two non-counting scores of the two rounds.

Individual leaders

Place	Player	Country	Score	To par
1	Peter McEvoy	England	69-71=140	−4
2	Iain Carslaw	Scotland	70-74=144	E
2	Alexis Godillot	France	72-72=144	E
T4	Allan Brodie	Scotland	74-71=145	+1
T4	Brian Hoey	Ireland	71-74=145	+1
T6	Jan Lindberg	Denmark	77-69=146	+2
T6	Philippe Ploujoux	France	72-74=146	+2
T8	Michael Kelley	England	73-74=147	+3
T8	Sandy Lyle	England	72-75=147	+3
T8	Veit Pagel	West Germany	75-72=147	+3

Note: There was no official award for the lowest individual score.

Flight A

Bracket

Quarter finals
Scotland	5
Switzerland	2
Denmark	4
Italy	3
France	5.5
West Germany	1.5
Sweden	5
England	2

Semi finals
Scotland	6
Denmark	1
Sweden	4
France	3

Final
Scotland	5
Sweden	2
Bronze match
France	4
Denmark	3

Elimination matches
Switzerland	4.5
Italy	2.5
England	6.5
West Germany	0.5

Match for 5th place
England	5.5
Switzerland	1.5
Match for 7th place
Italy	4
West Germany	3

Final games

Scotland	Sweden
5	2
S. Martin / C. Green 3 & 2	B. Bäckstedt / J. Rube
A. Brodie / G. Murray	G. Lundqvist / M. Sorling 1 hole
Gordon Murray 3 & 2	Krister Kinell
Steve Martin 6 & 5	Jan Andhagen
Charlie Green 19th	Mikael Sorling
Allan Brodie	Göran Lundqvist 3 & 2
Iain Carslaw 2 & 1	Jan Rube

Flight B

Bracket

Round 1
Wales	6
Portugal	1
Spain	4
Netherlands	3
Norway	5
Austria	2
Ireland	6
Belgium	1

Round 2
Wales	4
Spain	3
Norway	4
Ireland	3

Match for 9th place
Wales	4
Norway	3
Match for 11th place
Spain	4
Ireland	3

Elimination matches
Netherlands	5
Portugal	2
Belgium	5
Austria	2

Match for 13th place
Netherlands	4
Belgium	3
Match for 15th place
Austria	4
Portugal	3

Final standings

Place	Country
1st place, gold medalist(s)	Scotland
2nd place, silver medalist(s)	Sweden
3rd place, bronze medalist(s)	France
4	Denmark
5	England
6	Switzerland
7	Italy
8	West Germany
9	Wales
10	Norway
11	Spain
12	Ireland
13	Netherlands
14	Belgium
15	Austria
16	Portugal

== See also ==
- Eisenhower Trophy – biennial world amateur team golf championship for men organized by the International Golf Federation.
- European Ladies' Team Championship – European amateur team golf championship for women organised by the European Golf Association.
