= 1980 Eisenhower Trophy =

Coordinates: 35.190°N 79.468°W

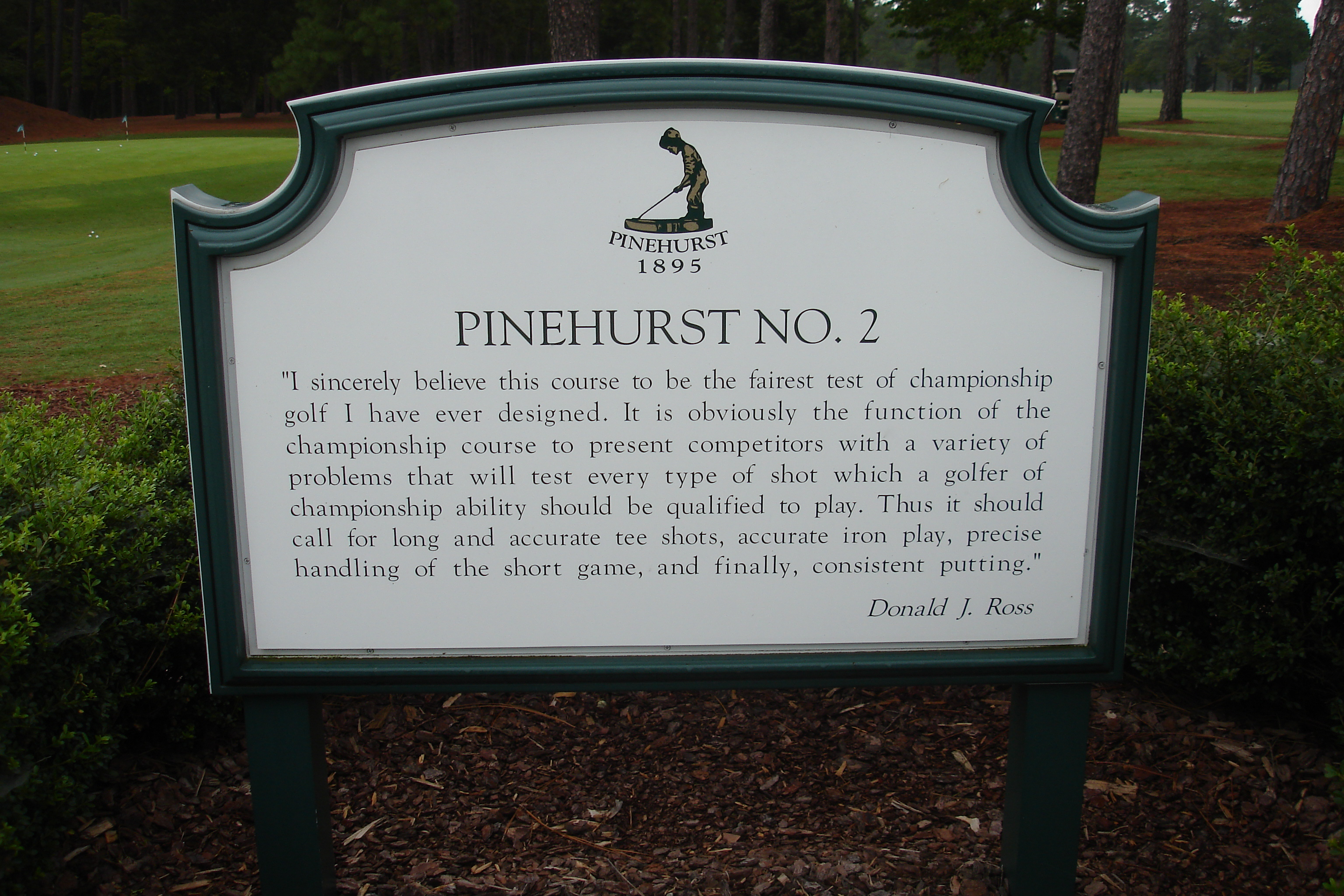
- Pinehurst Country Club Course No. 2

Tournament information
- Dates: October 8–11
- Location: Pinehurst, North Carolina
- Courses: Pinehurst Country Club (No. 2 course)
- Format: 72 holes stroke play

Statistics
- Par: 72
- Length: 6,960 yards (6,360 m)
- Field: 39 teams 156 players

Champion
- United States; Jim Holtgrieve, Jay Sigel, Hal Sutton & Bob Tway
- 848 (−16)

The 1980 Eisenhower Trophy took place October 8 to 11 on the No. 2 course at the Pinehurst Country Club in Pinehurst, North Carolina. It was the 12th World Amateur Team Championship for the Eisenhower Trophy and the second time the event had been held in the United States, after the 1960 event. The tournament was a 72-hole stroke play team event with 39 four-man teams. The best three scores for each round counted towards the team total.

United States won the Eisenhower Trophy for the eighth time, finishing 27 strokes ahead of the silver medalists, South Africa. Chinese Taipei (now Taiwan) took the bronze medal, nine strokes further behind, while Japan finished fourth. Hal Sutton had the lowest individual score, 12-under-par 276, six strokes better than any other player.

== Teams ==
39 four-man teams contested the event.

| Country | Players |
|---|---|
| Argentina | Jorge de Ascuenago, Augusto Bruchman, Louis Carbonetti, Miguel Prado |
| Australia | Tony Gresham, John Kelly, Jeff Senior, Peter Sweeney |
| Austria | Uli Berlinger, Max Lamberg, Johann Lamberg, Klaus Nierlich |
| Belgium | Patrick Bonnelance, Eric Boyer de la Giroday, Oliver Buysse, Thierry Goosens |
| Bermuda | Brendin Ingham, Noel Smith, Kim Swan, Eric Hav Trott |
| Brazil | Carlos H. Dluhosch, Roberto Gomez, Rafael Gonzalez, Ricardo R. Rossi |
| Canada | Graham Cooke, Stu Hamilton, Greg Olson, Richard Zokol |
| Chile | Sebastian Aniat, Benjamin Astaburuaga Jr, A. Morales, Felipe Taverne |
| Colombia | Albert Evers, Jorge Luis Herrero, Ivan Renjifo, Richardo Ronderos |
| Denmark | Klaus Eldrup-Jørgensen, Christian Pein, Jacob Rasmussen, Anders Sørensen |
| Dominican Republic | Ramon Baez, Edwin Corrie, Edgar Pichardo, Guillermo Pumarol |
| El Salvador | Guillermo Aceto, Mauricio Alvarez, José Maria Duran, Jaime Munguia |
| Fiji | Vera Gounden, Vilikesa Kalou, Vijay Singh, Ulaisai Tabutoci |
| France | Herve Frayssineau, Alexis Godillot, François Illouz, Tim Planchin |
| Great Britain & Ireland | Gordon Brand Jnr, Ian Hutcheon, Peter McEvoy, Ronan Rafferty |
| Guatemala | Roberto Cottone, Manuel Ortiz, Gustavo Staebler, Alfonso Toledo |
| Hong Kong | Cam Gribben, Don Innes, Alex Tang, Tang Siu Wing |
| India | Ashok S. Malik, P. G. Sethi, Lakshman Singh, Vikramjit Singh |
| Israel | Laurie Been, Leon Eting, Robert Mandel, Neil Schochet |
| Italy | Andrea Canessa, Marco Durante, Antonio Lionello, Lorenzo Silva |
| Japan | Tatsuhiko Asakawa, Masayuki Naito, Tetsuo Sakata, Fuminori Sano |
| Mexico | Rafael Alarcón, Ignacio de Leon, José Martínez, Carlos Peláez |
| Netherlands | Carel Braun, Erik Hertzberger, Jaap van Neck, Bart Nolte, |
| New Zealand | Michael Barltrop, Geoff Clarke, Paul Hartstone, Colin Taylor |
| Norway | Eric Bjerkholt, Olaf Eie, Asbjørn Ramnefjell, Tore Sviland |
| Papua New Guinea | Greg Fennell, B. Giles, Tony Gover, Kundi Umba, Jimmy Wu |
| Philippines | Guillermo Ababa Jr, Eduardo Bagtas, Tomas Manotoc, Frankie Miñoza |
| Portugal | José Luis Correia, Nuno A. de Brito a Cunha, José Lara de Sousa e Melo, Antonio Dantes Oliveira |
| Puerto Rico | Elvyn Cordoval, Juan Ramos, James Teale, Carlos Vicente |
| South Africa | Etienne Groenewald, Duncan Lindsay-Smith, Wayne Player, David Suddards |
| South Korea | Byong Hoon Kim, Joo Heun Kim, Myon Kim, Kyong Chul Park |
| Spain | Eduardo de la Riva, Jesús Moreno, Roman Taya, Alfonso Vidaor |
| Sweden | Per Andersson, Anders Johnsson, Göran Lundquist, Jan Rube |
| Switzerland | C.A. Bagnoud, Ivan Couturier, Carlo Rampone, Johnny Storjohann |
| Taiwan | Chang Dong-liang, Chen Tze-chung, Wu Chun-lung, Yuan Ching-chi |
| United States | Jim Holtgrieve, Jay Sigel, Hal Sutton, Bob Tway |
| Venezuela | Armando Cabrera, Carlos Plaza, Luis E. Plaza, Carlos Whaite |
| West Germany | Hans G. Reiter, Ulrich Schulte, Christoph Stadler, Ralf Thielemann |
| Zimbabwe | Tony Hatchwell, Hennie Heyns, John Pritchard, Garry Taylor |

== Scores ==
| Place | Country | Score | To par |
|---|---|---|---|
| 1st place, gold medalist(s) | United States | 211-211-217-209=848 | −16 |
| 2nd place, silver medalist(s) | South Africa | 219-216-218-222=875 | +11 |
| 3rd place, bronze medalist(s) | Chinese Taipei | 219-221-221-223=884 | +20 |
| 4 | Japan | 223-219-225-220=887 | +23 |
| T5 | Australia | 231-225-213-221=890 | +26 |
| T5 | Canada | 221-221-225-223=890 | +26 |
| T5 | Great Britain & Ireland | 229-217-221-223=890 | +26 |
| 8 | Sweden | 230-221-223-220=894 | +30 |
| 9 | Mexico | 221-224-228-226=899 | +35 |
| 10 | New Zealand | 229-226-215-232=902 | +38 |
| 11 | Spain | 230-224-224-226=904 | +40 |
| T12 | Argentina | 227-232-227-231=917 | +53 |
| T12 | Italy | 232-223-231-231=917 | +53 |
| 14 | Philippines | 229-231-231-232=923 | +59 |
| T15 | Brazil | 230-231-228-235=924 | +60 |
| T15 | West Germany | 236-230-220-238=924 | +60 |
| 17 | France | 229-233-229-235=926 | +62 |
| 18 | Colombia | 240-229-225-233=927 | +63 |
| 19 | South Korea | 223-245-227-234=929 | +65 |
| T20 | Chile | 236-233-234-232=935 | +71 |
| T20 | India | 235-226-233-241=935 | +71 |
| T20 | Netherlands | 233-232-234-236=935 | +71 |
| T20 | Switzerland | 241-232-229-233=935 | +71 |
| T20 | Zimbabwe | 238-235-230-232=935 | +71 |
| 25 | Hong Kong | 244-229-232-239=944 | +80 |
| 26 | Belgium | 240-232-234-239=945 | +81 |
| T27 | Austria | 240-233-237-237=947 | +83 |
| T27 | Denmark | 240-230-236-241=947 | +83 |
| 29 | Venezuela | 239-238-232-243=952 | +88 |
| 30 | Norway | 237-240-235-241=953 | +89 |
| 31 | Fiji | 247-239-242-243=971 | +107 |
| 32 | Bermuda | 254-251-237-237=979 | +115 |
| 33 | Portugal | 242-239-247-256=984 | +120 |
| 34 | Papua New Guinea | 256-239-251-245=991 | +127 |
| 35 | Israel | 257-252-243-250=1002 | +138 |
| 36 | Dominican Republic | 251-245-253-254=1003 | +139 |
| 37 | Guatemala | 260-249-248-252=1009 | +145 |
| 38 | El Salvador | 255-257-266-265=1043 | +179 |
| 39 | Puerto Rico | 274-258-273-272=1077 | +213 |

== Individual leaders ==
There was no official recognition for the lowest individual scores.

| Place | Player | Country | Score | To par |
|---|---|---|---|---|
| 1 | Hal Sutton | United States | 68-69-71-68=276 | −12 |
| 2 | Chen Tze-chung | Chinese Taipei | 69-70-71-72=282 | −6 |
| 3 | Jim Holtgrieve | United States | 72-71-72-70=285 | −3 |
| 4 | Ronan Rafferty | Great Britain & Ireland | 72-70-71-73=286 | −2 |
| 5 | Bob Tway | United States | 72-71-74-71=288 | E |
| T6 | Tetsuo Sakata | Japan | 73-70-76-72=291 | +3 |
| T6 | Peter Sweeney | Australia | 75-74-69-73=291 | +3 |
| T8 | Masayuki Naito | Japan | 73-74-73-72=292 | +4 |
| T8 | David Suddards | South Africa | 79-72-71-70=292 | +4 |
| 10 | Anders Johnsson | Sweden | 72-75-75-71=293 | +5 |
