= Swedish Golfer of the Year =

- Silverbollen
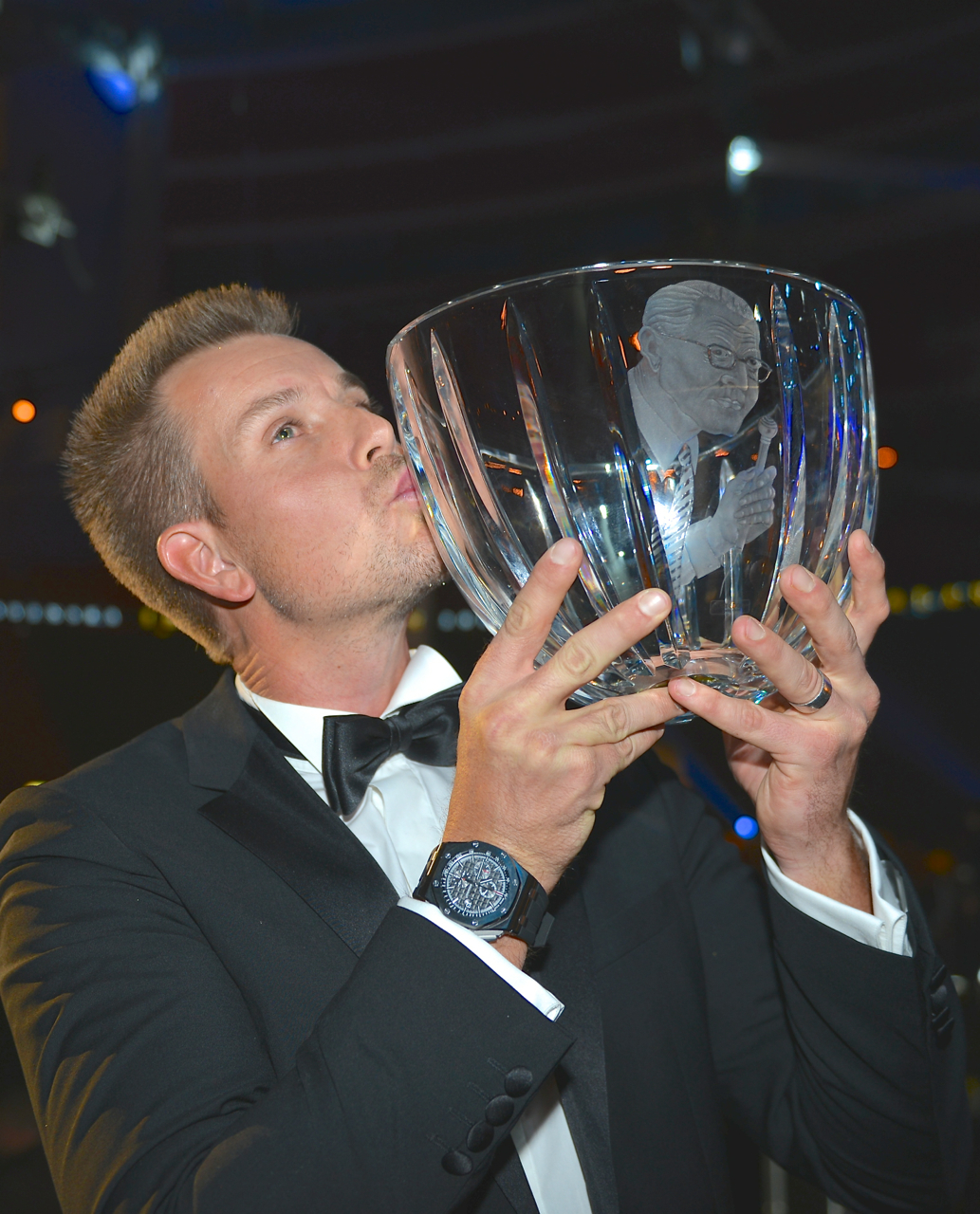
- Five time winner Henrik Stenson
- Awarded for: Excellence in golf performance and achievements
- Location: Stockholm
- Country: Sweden
- Presented by: Swedish Golf Federation
- First award: 1966

Highlights
- Most awards: Annika Sörenstam (9); Henrik Stenson (5)

Swedish Golfer of the Year is awarded annually by the Swedish Golf Federation.

The award is individual and awarded since 1966 to the Swedish golfer with the best overall golf performance each year, either in a series of achievements or a single big success. In the assessment the event difficulty, the competition, any surprises and pressing conditions are considered. The jury is made up of player representatives from PGA Sweden, golf journalists, and officials from the Swedish Golf Federation.

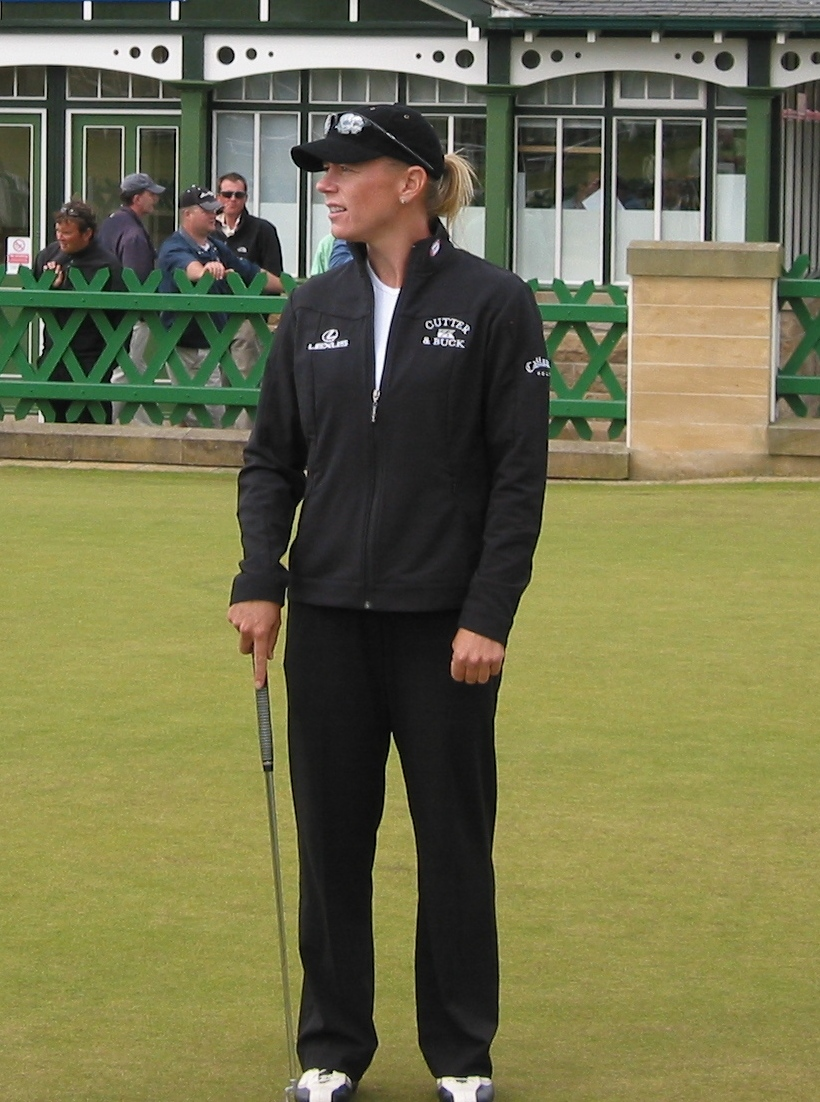
Annika Sörenstam has received the award nine times

== Winners ==
=== 1966–1975 ===
- 1966 – Liv Wollin (a)
- 1967 – Claes Jöhncke (a)
- 1968 – Liv Wollin (a)
- 1969 – Claes Jöhncke (a)
- 1970 – Hans Hedjerson (a)
- 1971 – Gunnar Mueller (a)
- 1972 – Christina Westerberg (a)
- 1973 – Hans Hedjerson (a)
- 1974 – Jan Rube (a)
- 1975 – Göran Lundqvist (a)

=== 1976–1985 ===
- 1976 – Hans Hedjerson (a)
- 1977 – Mikael Sorling (a)
- 1978 – Mikael Sorling (a)
- 1979 – Björn Svedin (a)
- 1980 – Anders Johnsson (a)
- 1981 – Krister Kinell (a)
- 1982 – Magnus Persson Atlevi (a)
- 1983 – Charlotte Montgomery
- 1984 – Anders Forsbrand
- 1985 – Liselotte Neumann

=== 1986–1995 ===
- 1986 – Ove Sellberg
- 1987 – Anders Forsbrand
- 1988 – Liselotte Neumann
- 1989 – Sofia Grönberg-Whitmore
- 1990 – Helen Alfredsson
- 1991 – Per-Ulrik Johansson
- 1992 – Anders Forsbrand
- 1993 – Joakim Haeggman
- 1994 – Liselotte Neumann
- 1995 – Annika Sörenstam

=== 1996–2005 ===
- 1996 – Annika Sörenstam
- 1997 – Annika Sörenstam
- 1998 – Annika Sörenstam
- 1999 – Jesper Parnevik
- 2000 – Sophie Gustafson
- 2001 – Annika Sörenstam
- 2002 – Annika Sörenstam
- 2003 – Annika Sörenstam
- 2004 – Annika Sörenstam
- 2005 – Annika Sörenstam

=== 2006–2014 ===
- 2006 – Henrik Stenson
- 2007 – Henrik Stenson
- 2008 – Robert Karlsson
- 2009 – Anna Nordqvist
- 2010 – Robert Karlsson
- 2011 – Caroline Hedwall
- 2012 – Peter Hanson
- 2013 – Henrik Stenson
- 2014 – Henrik Stenson

=== 2015–2025 ===
Year	Winner	Nominees and votes	Ref
2015	David Lingmerth	Nominees and votes: 1. David Lingmerth – 194; 2. Henrik Stenson – 171; 3. Anna Nordqvist – 140; 4. Kristoffer Broberg – 119; 5. Marcus Kinhult (a) – 55; 6. Alex Norén – 45; 7. Pernilla Lindberg – 15; 8. Rikard Karlberg – 12; 9. Henrik Norlander – 4; 10. Marcus Svensson (a) – 4	
2016	Henrik Stenson	Nominees and votes: 1. Henrik Stenson – 362; 2. Alex Norén – 283; 3. Anna Nordqvist – 165; 4. Madelene Sagström – 117; 5. Julia Engström (a) – 50; 6. David Lingmerth – 39; 7. Magnus Persson Atlevi – 27; 8. Rikard Karlberg – 23; 9. Jenny Haglund – 8; 10. Matilda Jonsson (a), Alexander Björk – 4	
2017	Anna Nordqvist	Nominees and votes: 1. Anna Nordqvist – 216; 2. Henrik Stenson – 128; 3. Alex Norén – 121; 4. Madelene Sagström – 81; 5. Alexander Björk – 56; 6. Pernilla Lindberg – 16; 7. Linn Grant (a) – 8; 8. Jonas Blixt, Frida Kinhult (a) – 6; 9. Joakim Björkman (a), Amanda Linnér (a) – 4; 10. Marcus Kinhult – 3	
2018	Pernilla Lindberg	Nominees and votes: 1. Pernilla Lindberg – 211; 2. Alex Norén – 163; 3. Alexander Björk – 84; 4. Jenny Haglund – 63; 5. Henrik Stenson – 59	
2019	Marcus Kinhult	Nominees: 1. Marcus Kinhult; 2. Sebastian Söderberg; 3. Helen Alfredsson; 4. Henrik Stenson; 5. Frida Kinhult (a)	
2020	Madelene Sagström	Nominees: 1. Madelene Sagström; 2. Julia Engström; 3. Henrik Norlander; 4. Frida Kinhult; 5. Linn Grant (a)	
2021	Anna Nordqvist	Not disclosed	
2022	Linn Grant	Not disclosed	
2023	Ludvig Åberg	Not disclosed	
2024	Ludvig Åberg	Not disclosed	
2025	Maja Stark	Not disclosed	

(a) indicates amateur status during main part of season in question.

== Multiple winners ==
Wins	Winner	Years won
9	Annika Sörenstam	1995 · 1996 · 1997 · 1998 · 2001 · 2002 · 2003 · 2004 · 2005
5	Henrik Stenson	2006 · 2007 · 2013 · 2014 · 2016
3	Hans Hedjerson (a)	1970 · 1973 · 1976
3	Anders Forsbrand	1984 · 1987 · 1992
3	Liselotte Neumann	1985 · 1988 · 1994
3	Anna Nordqvist	2009 · 2017 · 2021
2	Mikael Sorling (a)	1977 · 1978
2	Liv Wollin (a)	1966 · 1968
2	Claes Jöhncke (a)	1967 · 1969
2	Robert Karlsson	2008 · 2010
2	Ludvig Åberg	2023 · 2024

== See also ==
- European Tour Golfer of the Year
- Ladies European Tour Golfer of the Year
- Guldbollen
