= 1981 European Amateur Team Championship =

Golf competition

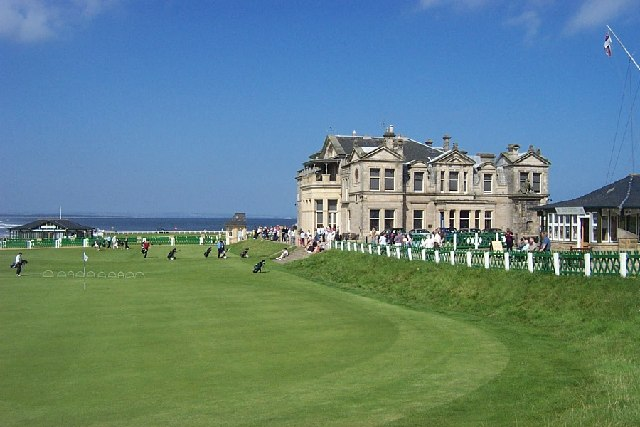
- 18th green at the Old Course at St Andrews

Tournament information
- Dates: 24–28 June 1981
- Location: St Andrews, Scotland; 56.343°N 2.803°W
- Course: Old Course at St Andrews
- Organized by: European Golf Association
- Format: Qualification round: 36 holes stroke play Knock-out match-play

Statistics
- Par: 72
- Length: 6,933 yards (6,340 m)
- Field: 19 teams 114 players

Champion
- England; Roger Chapman, Peter Deeble, Paul Downes, Geoffrey Godwin, Peter McEvoy, Paul Way
- Qualification round: 747 (+27); Final match: 4–3

Location map
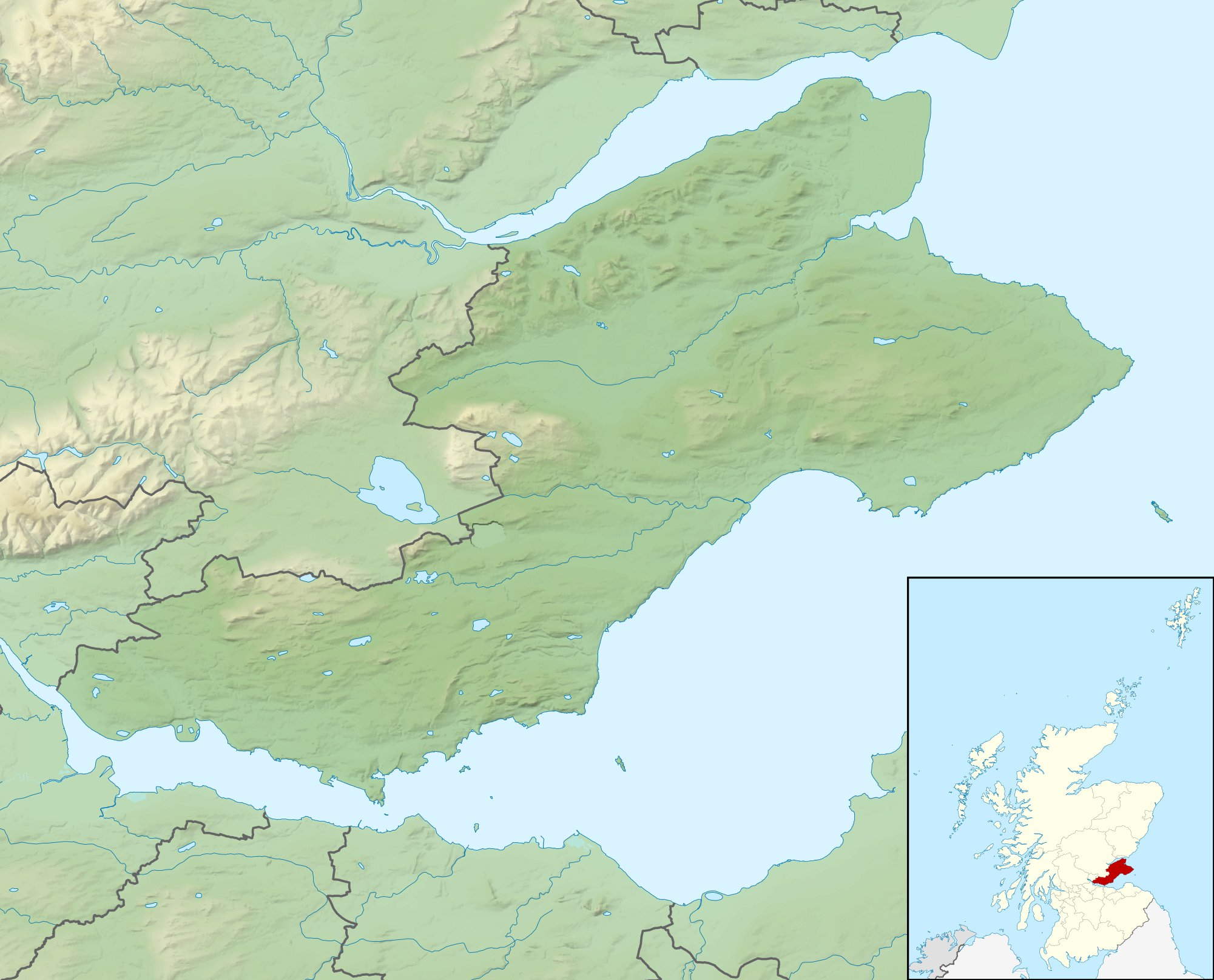
- Location in Europe Location in the British Isles Location in Scotland Location in Fife, Scotland

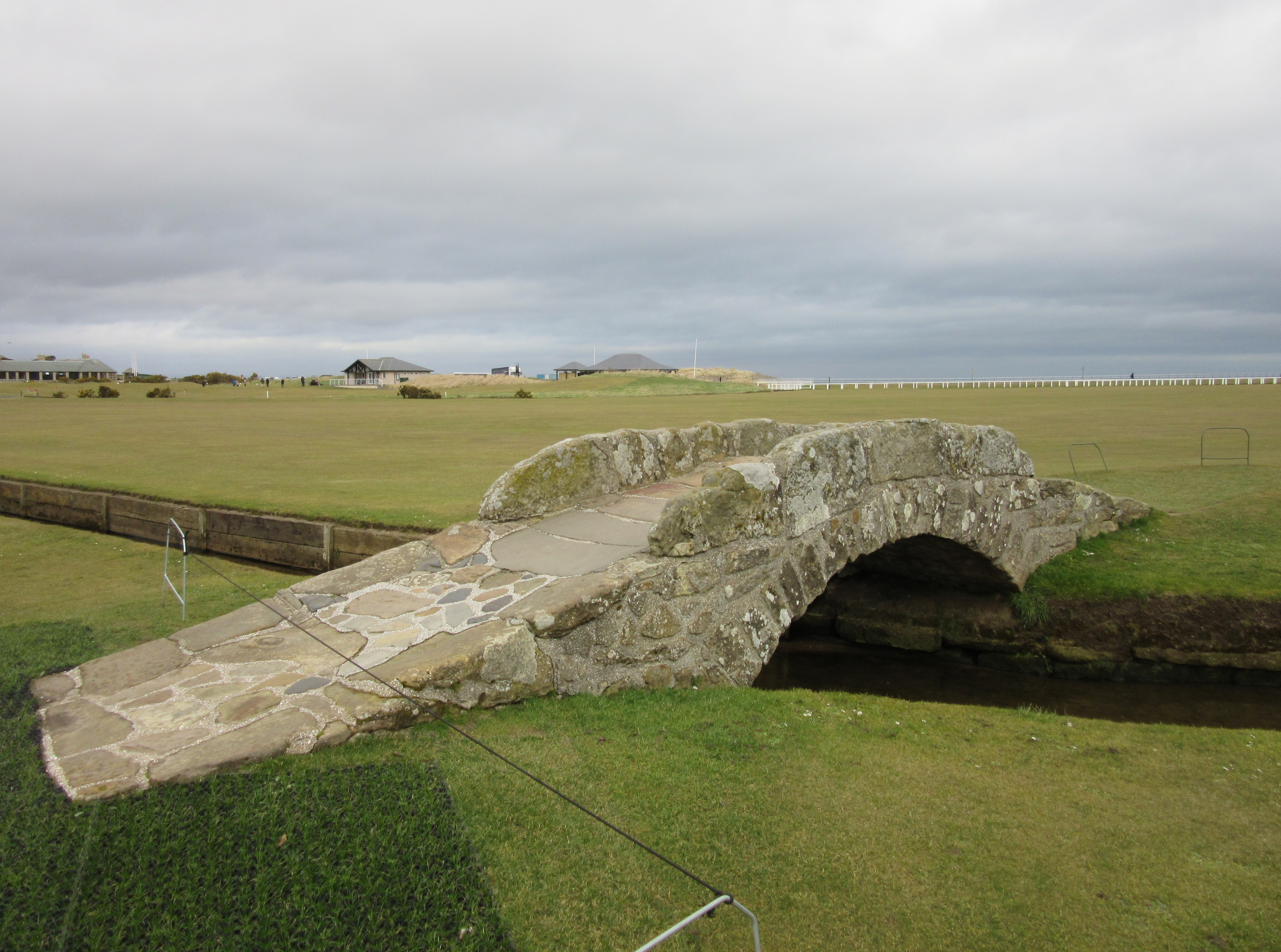
The Swilcan Bridge spanning the Swilcan Burn on the Old Course

The 1981 European Amateur Team Championship took place 24–28 June at the Old Course at St Andrews, Scotland. It was the 12th men's golf European Amateur Team Championship.

== Venue ==
The Old Course at St Andrews is considered to be the "home of golf" because the sport was first played on the links at St Andrews in the early 15th century. It had previously hosted The Open Championship 22 times, more than any other course, and has since continued to be one of the golf courses in the Open Championship hosting course rotation.

For the 1981 European Amateur Team Championship, the course was set up with par 72 over 6,933 yards.

== Format ==
Each team consisted of five or six players, playing two rounds of stroke-play over two days, counting the five best scores each day for each team.

The eight best teams formed flight A, in knock-out match-play over the next three days. The teams were seeded based on their positions after the stroke play. The first placed team were drawn to play the quarter-final against the eight placed team, the second against the seventh, the third against the sixth and the fourth against the fifth. Teams were allowed to use six players during the team matches, selecting four of them in the two morning foursome games and five players in to the afternoon single games. Games all square at the 18th hole were declared halved, if the team match was already decided.

The eight teams placed 9–16 in the qualification stroke-play formed flight B, to play similar knock-out play, and the three teams placed 17–19 formed flight C, to all play against each other, to decide their final positions.

== Teams ==
19 nation teams contested the event. Each team consisted of five or six players.

Players in the leading teams

| Country | Players |
|---|---|
| Denmark | Erik Groth-Andersen, Per Sørgaard-Jensen, John Nielsen, Leif Nyholm, Jacob Rasmussen, Anders Sørensen |
| England | Roger Chapman, Peter Deeble, Paul Downes, Geoffrey Godwin, Peter McEvoy, Paul Way |
| France | Jean-Charles Gassiat, Alexis Godillot, François Illouz, Roger Lagarde, Tim Planchin, Philippe Ploujoux |
| Ireland | D. Brannigan, Mark Gannon, Garth McGimpsey, Arthur Pierse, Ronan Rafferty, Philip Walton |
| Scotland | Frank Coutts, Colin Dalgleish, Barclay Howard, John Huggan, Ian Hutcheon, George MacGregor |
| Sweden | Per Andersson, Anders Forsbrand, Krister Kinell, Göran Lundqvist, Jan Rube, Ove Sellberg |
| Wales | R.D. Broad, Duncan Evans, Hugh Evans, John Roger Jones, David McLean, Jonathan Morrow |
| West Germany | Kai Flint, Thomas Hübner, Hans-Günter Reiter, J. Schuchmann, Ulrich Schulte, Ralf Thielemann |

Other participating teams

Country
Austria
Belgium
Czechoslovakia
Finland
Iceland
Italy
Luxembourg
Netherlands
Norway
Portugal
Spain
Switzerland

== Winners ==
Team France won the opening 36-hole stroke-play qualifying competition, despite playing with only five players and having to count all five scores, because of an arm injury to team member Roger Lagarde, who could not play.

There was no official award for the lowest individual score, but individual leader was François Illouz, France, with a score of 2-under-par 142, one stroke ahead of Philip Walton, Ireland.

Defending champions team England won the gold medal, earning their sixth title, beating host country Scotland in the final 4–3. The last and deciding game, between Peter Deeble, England, and Ian Hutcheon, Scotland, went on to the 20th hole, in beginning darkness. Hutcheon had made a necessary birdie on the 18th to tie the match and holed a chip shot on the first extra hole to survive after hitting in to the Swilcan Burn, but Deeble won the 20th hole and the championship for England.

Team Wales earned the bronze on third place, after beating France 4–3 in the bronze match.

== Results ==
Qualification round

Team standings

| Place | Country | Score | To par |
|---|---|---|---|
| 1 | France | 367-367=734 | +14 |
| 2 | Wales | 736 | +16 |
| 3 | Scotland | 739 | +19 |
| 4 | Ireland | 740 | +20 |
| 5 | England | 747 | +27 |
| 6 | Sweden | 750 | +30 |
| 7 | West Germany | 753 | +33 |
| 8 | Denmark | 760 | +40 |
| 9 | Italy | 762 | +42 |
| 10 | Spain | 765 | +45 |
| 11 | Switzerland | 768 | +48 |
| 12 | Norway | 773 | +53 |
| 13 | Iceland | 776 | +56 |
| 14 | Finland | 782 | +62 |
| 15 | Austria | 791 | +71 |
| 16 | Netherlands | 792 | +72 |
| 17 | Belgium | 795 | +75 |
| 18 | Portugal | 805 | +85 |
| 19 | Luxembourg | 837 | +117 |

Individual leaders

| Place | Player | Country | Score | To par |
|---|---|---|---|---|
| 1 | François Illouz | France | 71-71=142 | −2 |
| 2 | Philip Walton | Ireland | 75-68=143 | −1 |
| T3 | Duncan Evans | Wales | 67-77=144 | E |
| T3 | Per Sørgaard-Jensen | Denmark | 72-72=144 | E |
| T5 | Hugh Evans | Wales | 73-72=145 | +1 |
| T5 | John Huggan | Scotland | 75-70=145 | +1 |
| T7 | Frank Coutts | Scotland | 74-72=146 | +2 |
| T7 | Ragnar Olafsson | Iceland | 74-72=146 | +2 |

Note: There was no official award for the lowest individual scores.

Flight A

Bracket

Quarter finals
Wales | 5
West Germany | 2
Scotland | 4
Sweden | 3
England | 5
Ireland | 2
France | 4
Denmark | 3

Semi finals
Scotland | 5.5
Wales | 0.5
England | 7
France | 0

Final
England | 4
Scotland | 3
Bronze match
Wales | 4
France | 3

Elimination matches
West Germany | 4
Sweden | 3
Ireland | 5
Denmark | 2

Match for 5th place
Ireland | 6
West Germany | 1
Match for 7th place
Sweden | 4
Denmark | 3

Final games

| England | Scotland |
| 4 | 3 |
| P. McEvoy / P. Deeble | B. Howard / I. Hutcheon 19th hole |
| R. Chapman / P. Way 5 & 4 | F. Coutts / C. Dalgleish |
| Peter Deeble 20th hole | Ian Hutcheon |
| Peter McEvoy 4 & 3 | Colin Dalgleisg |
| Geoffrey Godwin 4 & 2 | Barclay Howard |
| Paul Way | Frank Coutts 4 & 3 |
| Roger Chapman | George MacGregor 1 hole |

Flight B

Bracket

Round 1
Austria | 4
Spain | 3
Switzerland | 5.5
Finland | 1.5
Iceland | 5
Norway | 2
Netherlands | 4
Italy | 3

Round 2
Switzerland | 4.5
Austria | 2.5
Netherlands | 4
Iceland | 3

Match for 9th place
Switzerland | 4
Netherlands | 3
Match for 11th place
Austria | 5
Iceland | 2

Elimination matches
Spain | 4
Finland | 3
Norway | 5
Italy | 2

Match for 13th place
Norway | 4
Spain | 3
Match for 15th place
Italy | 5.5
Finland | 1.5

Flight C

| Luxembourg | Portugal |
| 4 | 3 |

| Belgium | Luxembourg |
| 4 | 3 |

| Belgium | Portugal |
| 4 | 3 |

Final standings

| Place | Country |
|---|---|
| 1st place, gold medalist(s) | England |
| 2nd place, silver medalist(s) | Scotland |
| 3rd place, bronze medalist(s) | Wales |
| 4 | France |
| 5 | Ireland |
| 6 | West Germany |
| 7 | Sweden |
| 8 | Denmark |
| 9 | Switzerland |
| 10 | Netherlands |
| 11 | Austria |
| 12 | Iceland |
| 13 | Norway |
| 14 | Spain |
| 15 | Italy |
| 16 | Finland |
| 17 | Belgium |
| 18 | Luxembourg |
| 19 | Portugal |

== See also ==
- Eisenhower Trophy – biennial world amateur team golf championship for men organized by the International Golf Federation.
- European Ladies' Team Championship – European amateur team golf championship for women organised by the European Golf Association.
