= Göran Zachrisson =

Swedish sports journalist (1938–2021)

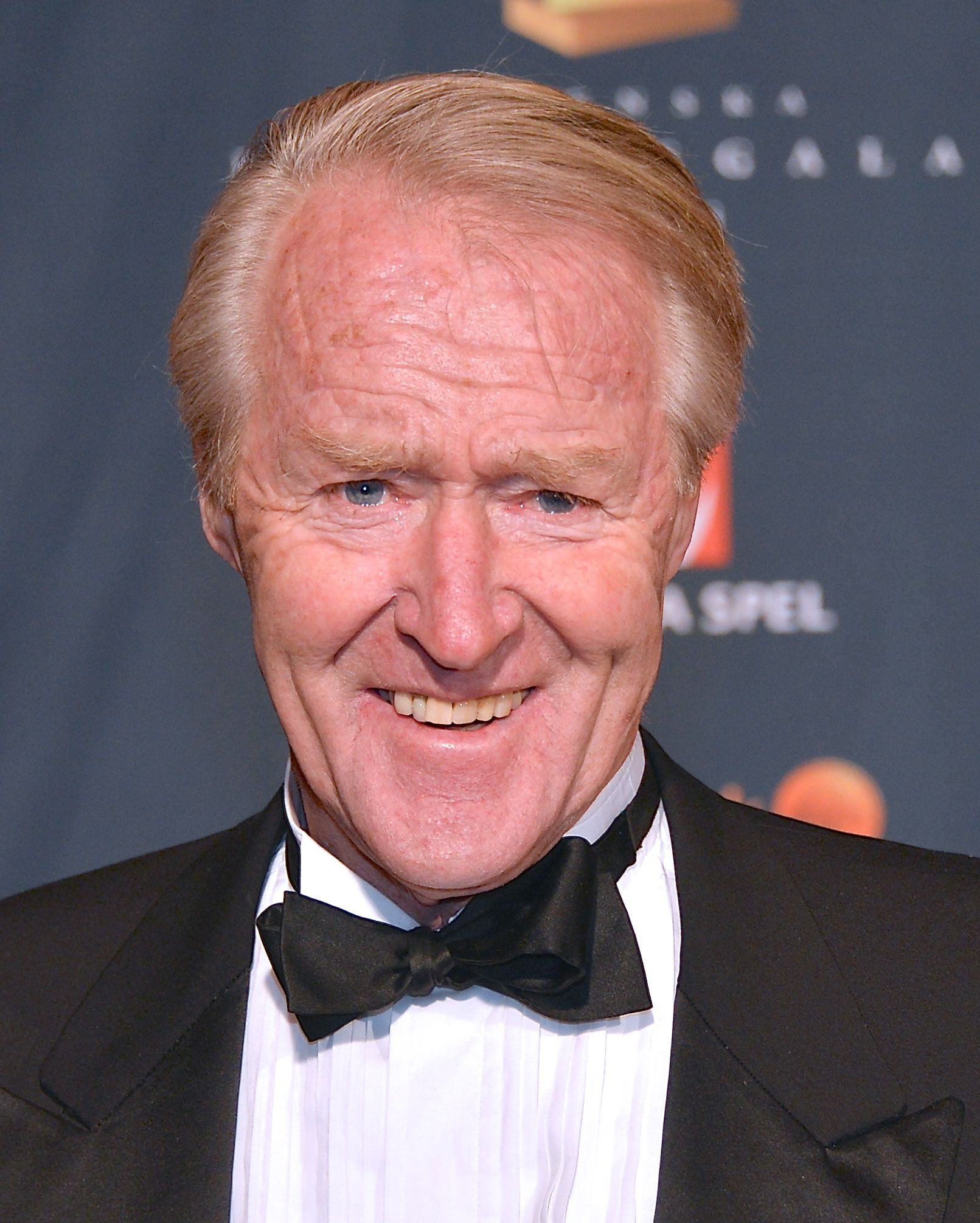
- Göran Zachrisson at the Swedish sports Awards in January 2013
- Born: 14 May 1938
- Died: 11 August 2021 (aged 83); Stockholm
- Children: Jonas Zachrisson

Goran Zachrisson (14 May 1938 – 11 August 2021) was a Swedish golf and sports journalist and television commentator from Stockholm. Zachrisson was known for his golfing skills and his distinct style of reporting.

From 1964 to 1967, Zachrisson was editor in chief of the magazine Svensk Golf. Since 1966, he was a commentator for the TV broadcasts of The Open Championship and many other golf tournaments. In the early 1990s, he was hired by Viasat, and since then was a golf commentator on its channels, including the Viasat Sport channels. He also wrote about golf for many periodicals, including Svensk Golf, Golf-Store Magazine and Golf Digest. In later years, he was also a commentator at sailing events.

Zachrisson was a member of Djursholm Golf Club, where he was president of the banking committee, and since 1992 was a member of The Royal and Ancient Golf Club of St Andrews, the world's most prestigious golf club. Zachrisson was also a member of Sand GC, Stockholms GK, Svartinge, the Royal Liverpool GC and Charlton G&CC.

In a summer address on 18 July 2007, Zachrisson mentioned among other things that his son Jonas was playing in the Swedish synthpop band NASA. He also wrote a book on skates for tour skating.

In March 2012, Göran Zachrisson interviewed Zlatan Ibrahimović, captain of the Swedish soccer team. The interview, titled Zlatan Exklusivt (Zlatan Exclusive) was seen by over two million viewers on Swedish TV.

Zachrisson died after a short battle with cancer in August 2021 at the age of 83.

== Honors ==
- 1979 Golden Club of the Swedish Golf Association
- 1994 Wall plaque of the Professional Golfers' Association of Sweden

== Bibliography ==
- Golf för alla: att spela golf: utrustning, teknik, tävlingsformer, kostnader (1968)
- På långfärdsskridskor (2000)
- 20 berättelser om golf (2006)
- Fler berättelser om golf (2011)
