= P. G. Sethi =

Indian golfer

Prem Gopal "Biloo" Sethi (died c. 1981), was an Indian golfer. He was the only amateur to win the Indian Open, having done so in 1965.

== Career ==
Sethi was born in Srinagar, Jammu and Kashmir. Originally a cricketer, he took up golf after being left out the Indian cricket team.

Playing at Royal Calcutta Golf Club, Sethi won the Indian Open by seven strokes over an international field which included Peter Thomson, beginning play with five-under 68s on the opening two days. This remained the only win by an Indian golfer of the tournament until 1991. Sethi was a six-time winner of the Amateur Golf Championship of Sri Lanka. Sethi was also a member of the Indian team which won the 1973 Asia-Pacific Championship in Jakarta.

== Awards and honors ==
- In 1961, Sethi was the first golfer to receive the Arjuna Award
- Sethi has been the namesake of several tournaments and trophies, including the Biloo Sethi Trophy, awarded at the All India Ladies' Open Amateur Golf Championships for aggregate best gross score over two days.

== Professional wins (1) ==
- 1965 Indian Open

== Team appearances ==
Amateur

- Eisenhower Trophy (representing India): 1958, 1960, 1962, 1964, 1966, 1968, 1978, 1980
- Nomura Cup (representing India): 1973 (winners) - incomplete
