= Equity & Law Challenge =

Tournament information
- Location: Richmond, London, England
- Established: 1987
- Course: Royal Mid-Surrey Golf Club
- Tours: European Tour (approved special event)
- Format: 54-hole modified Stableford (36-holes in 1987)
- Final year: 1992

Final champion
- (Sweden) Anders Forsbrand

The Equity & Law Challenge was an unofficial-money golf tournament on the European Tour that was played from 1987 to 1992. All six editions were played on a relatively short composite course at Royal Mid-Surrey Golf Club. The event used a Modified Stableford points system with 2 points for an eagle and 1 for a birdie. Ties were split by the number of pars. Qualification for the event was based on a season-long points system in which points were gained for birdies and eagles in European Tour events.

== Winners ==
Year	Winner	Score	Margin of victory	Runner(s)-up	Winner's share (£)	Ref
1987	(England) Barry Lane	15 points	1 point	(United States) Bill Malley	20,000	
1988	(Northern Ireland) Ronan Rafferty	21 points	1 point	(England) Barry Lane	21,000	
1989	(Australia) Brett Ogle	25 points	4 points	(Scotland) Colin Montgomerie	22,570	
1990	(Scotland) Brian Marchbank	22 points	1 point	(England) Derrick Cooper (United States) Peter Teravainen	20,000	
1991	(Scotland) Brian Marchbank	22 points	3 points	(England) Barry Lane	25,000	
1992	(Sweden) Anders Forsbrand	20 points	3 points	(England) Russell Claydon	25,000	

The 1987 event was played over 36 holes but later editions were over 54 holes.
