= Chris Bonython =

Australian amateur golfer

Personal information
- Full name: Christopher Stephen Bonython
- Nationality: Australia
- Born: 13 October 1947 (age 79) Medindie, Adelaide, South Australia

Career
- Sport: Golf
- Status: Amateur

Christopher Stephen Bonython (born 13 October 1947) is an Australian amateur golfer. He won the 1975 Australian Amateur and represented Australia in two Eisenhower Trophy events, in 1976 and 1978.

== Early life ==
Bonython was born in Medindie, Adelaide, on 13 October 1947, the son of Kym Bonython and his first wife Jean.

== Golf career ==
Bonython won the 1975 Australian Amateur beating the defending champion, Terry Gale, by one hole in the final. They were level after 35 holes, but Bonython holed a 40-foot putt at the last to win. He reached the final again in 1977 where playing Tony Gresham, in another close match, he lost at the 40th hole, with Gresham holing a long putt. He was also a medalist in 1976. Bonython won the 1973 South Australian Amateur Championship.

Bonython was runner-up in the 1978 South Australian Open at Glenelg, 6 strokes behind fellow amateur Tony Gresham, Rodger Davis taking the first prize as the leading professional.

Bonython played in two Eisenhower Trophy contests, in 1976 and 1978, Australia winning the bronze medal on both occasions. He also represented Australia in the Sloan Morpeth Trophy against New Zealand.

== Tournament wins ==
- 1973 South Australian Amateur Championship
- 1975 Australian Amateur

== Team appearances ==
- Eisenhower Trophy (representing Australia): 1976, 1978
- Sloan Morpeth Trophy (representing Australia): 1976
- Australian Men's Interstate Teams Matches (representing South Australia): 1971, 1972, 1973, 1974, 1975 (winners), 1976, 1977, 1978
