= 1979 European Amateur Team Championship =

Golf competition

Tournament information
- Dates: 27 June – 1 July 1979
- Location: Esbjerg, Denmark; 55°34′N 08°20′E
- Course: Esbjerg Golf Club (Marbæk Course)
- Organized by: European Golf Association
- Format: Qualification round: 36 holes stroke play Knock-out match-play

Statistics
- Par: 71
- Length: 6,974 yards (6,377 m)
- Field: 19 teams 114 players

Champion
- England; Ian Bradshaw, Peter Deeble, Paul Downes, Geoffrey Godwin, Michael Kelley, Peter McEvoy
- Qualification round: 755 (+45); Final match: 5.5–1.5
- Location in Europe Location in Denmark

The 1979 European Amateur Team Championship took place 27 June – 1 July at Esbjerg Golf Club, Esbjerg, Denmark. It was the 11th men's golf European Amateur Team Championship.

== Venue ==
The tournament was played at the club's Marbæk Course, 15 kilometres north of Esbjerg, Denmark, built in 1975. There were hard winds blowing during the whole tournament on the par 71 course, not far from the North Sea.

== Format ==
Each team consisted of 6 players, playing two rounds of stroke-play over two days, counting the five best scores each day for each team.

The eight best teams formed flight A, in knock-out match-play over the next three days. The teams were seeded based on their positions after the stroke play. The first placed team were drawn to play the quarter-final against the eight placed team, the second against the seventh, the third against the sixth and the fourth against the fifth. Teams were allowed to use six players during the team matches, selecting four of them in the two morning foursome games and five players in to the afternoon single games. Games all square at the 18th hole were declared halved, if the team match was already decided.

The eight teams placed 9–16 in the qualification stroke-play formed flight B to play similar knock-out play and the three teams placed 17–19 formed flight C to meet each other, to decide their final positions.

== Teams ==
19 nation teams contested the event. Each team consisted of six players.

| Country | Players |
|---|---|
| Austria | R. Bodenseer, J. Gross-Saurau, Johann Lamberg, Max Lamberg, Klaus Nierlich, Christoph Prasthofer |
| Belgium | Benoit Dumont, Michel Eaton, Eric Boyer de la Giroday, Thierry Goosens, M. Moerman, Freddy Rodesch |
| Czechoslovakia | Jiri Dvorac, Pavel Fulin, A. Kopta, Jan Kunsta, Jiri Kunsta, Miroslav Nemec |
| Denmark | Henry Knudsen, Jan Lindberg, John Nielsen, Christian Pein, Jacob Rasmussen, Anders Sørensen |
| England | Ian Bradshaw, Peter Deeble, Paul Downes, Geoffrey Godwin, Michael Kelley, Peter McEvoy |
| Finland | J. Alatalo, Patrick Halamaa, K. Ikola, Pekka Kuivasaari, Timo Sipponen, J. Vilmunen |
| France | Sven Boinet, Hervé Frayssineau, Alexis Godillot, François Illouz, Roger Lagarde, Philippe Ploujoux |
| Iceland | Hannes Eyvindsson, J.H. Gudlaugsson, S. Hafsteinsson, Sigurdur Sigurdsson, Geir Svansson, Björgvin Thorsteinsson |
| Ireland | Mark Gannon, Raymond Kane, David Long, Mick Morris, Pat Mulcare, Hugh Smyth |
| Italy | Andrea Canessa, Franco Gigliarelli, Frederico Lang, Antonio Lionello, Lorenzo Silva, M. Zanchello |
| Luxembourg | B. Clasen, A, Graas, N. Graas, Y. Görgen, J. Lamparski, C. Schock, G. Schumann |
| Netherlands | Carel Braun, J. Heinen, Bart Nolte, Toby Rijks, P. Streutgers, Victor Swane |
| Norway | Erik Dønnestad, Petter Dønnestad, Ole-Christian. Hammer, Johan Horn, Asbjørn Ramnefjell, K. Vinter |
| Scotland | Gordon Brand Jnr, Allan Brodie, Iain Carslaw, Charlie Green, Ian Hutcheon, Brian Marchbank |
| Spain | José Luis de Bernardo, Gonzaga Escauriaza, Santiago Fernández, José Gancedo, Alejo Ollé, Román Taya |
| Sweden | Dag Aurell, Anders Johnsson, Krister Kinell, Björn Svedin, Jan Rube, Mikael Sorling |
| Switzerland | Charles André Bagnoud, Martin Frank, Thomas Henz, Yves Hofstetter, Martin Kessler, Johnny Storjohann |
| Wales | Hugh Evans, John Roger Jones, David McLean, Terry Melia, Jonathan Morrow, Mark Mouland |
| West Germany | Thomas Hübner, Veit Pagel, Hans-Günther Reiter, Frank Schlig, J. Schuchmann, Ulrich Schulte |

== Winners ==
Team England won the gold medal, earning their fifth title, beating Wales in the final 5.5–1.5. Team Ireland earned the bronze on third place, after beating host nation Denmark 5.5–1.5 in the bronze match.

There was no official award for the lowest individual score in the opening 36-hole stroke-play qualifying competition, but individual leader was Paul Downes, England, with a score of 5-over-par 147, three strokes ahead of nearest competitors, his two teammates Peter McEvoy and Michael Kelley.

Björn Svedin, Sweden, shot a new course record 72 over 18 holes on the first day of competition. The course record was equaled by Michael Kelley, England, in the second round the next day, also scoring 72.

== Results ==
Qualification round

Team standings

| Place | Country | Score | To par |
|---|---|---|---|
| 1 | England | 380-375=755 | +45 |
| T2 | Sweden * | 386-393=779 | +69 |
| T2 | Wales | 392-387=779 | +69 |
| 4 | Ireland | 382-401=783 | +73 |
| 5 | Scotland | 387-400=787 | +77 |
| 6 | France | 398-390=788 | +78 |
| 7 | Denmark | 386-416=802 | +92 |
| 8 | West Germany | 400-404=804 | +94 |
| 9 | Switzerland | 402-415=817 | +107 |
| 10 | Netherlands | 415-407=822 | +112 |
| T11 | Norway * | 410-413=823 | +113 |
| T11 | Italy | 408-415=823 | +113 |
| 13 | Austria | 404-423=827 | +117 |
| 14 | Belgium | 416-412=828 | +118 |
| 15 | Spain | 416-418=834 | +124 |
| 16 | Iceland | 426-413=839 | +129 |
| 17 | Finland | 430-420=850 | +140 |
| 18 | Czechoslovakia | 436-432=868 | +158 |
| 19 | Luxembourg | 459-452=911 | +201 |

* Note: In the event of a tie the order was determined by the best total of the two non-counting scores of the two rounds.

Individual leaders

| Place | Player | Country | Score | To par |
|---|---|---|---|---|
| 1 | Paul Downes | England | 74-73=147 | +5 |
| 2 | Michael Kelley | England | 78-72=150 | +8 |
| 2 | Peter McEvoy | England | 75-75=150 | +8 |
| T4 | Mark Gannon | Ireland | 75-79=154 | +12 |
| T4 | Brian Marchbank | Scotland | 77-77=154 | +12 |
| T4 | Jonathan Morrow | Wales | 78-76=154 | +12 |
| T4 | Philippe Ploujoux | France | 81-73=154 | +12 |
| T4 | Jan Rube | Sweden | 76-78=154 | +12 |
| T4 | Mikael Sorling | Sweden | 79-75=154 | +12 |
| T10 | David McLean | Wales | 78-77=155 | +13 |
| T10 | Björn Svedin | Sweden | 72-83=155 | +13 |

Note: There was no official award for the lowest individual score.

Flight A

Bracket

Quarter finals
Denmark | 4
Sweden | 3
Wales | 4.5
France | 2.5
Ireland | 4
Scotland | 3
England | 5.5
West Germany | 1.5

Semi finals
Wales | 4
Denmark | 3
England | 6
Ireland | 1

Final
England | 5.5
Wales | 1.5
Bronze match
Ireland | 4
Denmark | 3

Elimination matches
France | 5.5
Sweden | 1.5
Scotland | 5
West Germany | 2

Match for 5th place
Scotland | 5
France | 2
Match for 7th place
Sweden | 5.5
West Germany | 1.5

Final games

| England | Wales |
| 5.5 | 1.5 |
| P. Downes / P. McEvoy 5 & 4 | D. McLean / H. Evans |
| P. Deeble / I. Bradshaw 5 & 4 | J.R. Jones / T. Melia |
| Paul Downes 1 hole | John R. Jones |
| Peter McEvoy 5 & 4 | David McLean |
| Michael Kelley AS * | Hugh Evans AS * |
| Ian Bradshaw AS * | Mark Mouland AS * |
| Geoffrey Godwin AS * | Terry Melia AS * |

* Note: Games declared halved, since team match already decided.

Flight B

Bracket

Round 1
Spain | 6
Netherlands | 1
Norway | 4.5
Belgium | 2.5
Italy | 5
Austria | 2
Switzerland | 4
Iceland | 3

Round 2
Norway | 4
Spain | 3
Italy | 5.5
Switzerland | 1.5

Match for 9th place
Italy | 5.5
Norway | 1.5
Match for 11th place
Spain | 4
Switzerland | 3

Elimination matches
Netherlands | 5
Belgium | 2
Austria | 5.5
Iceland | 1.5

Match for 13th place
Netherlands | 4.5
Austria | 2.5
Match for 15th place
Belgium | 4
Iceland | 3

Flight C

| Czechoslovakia | Luxembourg |
| 6 | 1 |

| Finland | Luxembourg |
| 6 | 1 |

| Finland | Czechoslovakia |
| 4 | 3 |

Final standings

| Place | Country |
|---|---|
| 1st place, gold medalist(s) | England |
| 2nd place, silver medalist(s) | Wales |
| 3rd place, bronze medalist(s) | Ireland |
| 4 | Denmark |
| 5 | Scotland |
| 6 | France |
| 7 | Sweden |
| 8 | West Germany |
| 9 | Italy |
| 10 | Norway |
| 11 | Spain |
| 12 | Switzerland |
| 13 | Netherlands |
| 14 | Austria |
| 15 | Belgium |
| 16 | Iceland |
| 17 | Finland |
| 18 | Czechoslovakia |
| 19 | Luxembourg |

== See also ==
- Eisenhower Trophy – biennial world amateur team golf championship for men organized by the International Golf Federation.
- European Ladies' Team Championship – European amateur team golf championship for women organised by the European Golf Association.
