= PowerPlay Golf =

PowerPlay Golf is a shorter variation of golf, featuring two flags on a green and played over nine holes. It was devised by British amateur golfer Peter McEvoy, a former victorious captain of the Great Britain and Ireland Walker Cup team, and David Piggins, a sports venue owner and operator, assisted shortly afterwards by golf agency owner Andy Hiseman. McEvoy and Hiseman wrote the rules together in February 2007.

In PowerPlay Golf, players can choose to play to the 'easy' white flag or the more difficult black flag. If they score a birdie or better to the black flag, they earn double Stableford Points. Each golfer is compelled to take exactly three 'PowerPlays' in the first eight holes. They then have the option of a fourth 'PowerPlay' on the final hole. But if they get a net bogey or worse, they lose points from their total score.

The game was first played by 16 UK golf journalists at Playgolf Northwick Park Golf Course, London, on 6 February 2007. The format expanded its reach rapidly with a pilot scheme taking in 30 countries and over 400 golf courses by the end of 2010.

Played by the English Golf Union Elite Squad in training sessions, first occasion in April 2007.

David Kemp, a 3-handicap golfer from Guildford, Surrey, won the first ever National PowerPlay Golf Championships at Hampton Court Palace Golf Club, London, on 6 September 2007 – featured by Today's Golfer magazine.

On Thursday, 24 March 2011, PowerPlay Golf announced that Ken Schofield CBE, former European Tour Executive Director, had joined as chairman. On the same day it also announced that Convers Sports Initiatives had acquired a controlling interest in PowerPlay Golf, and announced a press conference to be held at The Celtic Manor Resort, Newport, South Wales, on Wednesday, 13 April 2011 at 14:00 UK time. On 30 May 2011, PowerPlay Golf: Ignition took place at Celtic Manor, featuring a field of Tour golfers.
