= 1978 Eisenhower Trophy =

Coordinates: 18.244°S 178.069°E

Tournament information
- Dates: 18–21 October
- Location: Navua, Viti Levu, Fiji
- Course: Pacific Harbour Golf & Country Club
- Format: 72 holes stroke play

Statistics
- Par: 72
- Length: 6,317 yards (5,776 m)
- Field: 24 teams 95 players

Champion
- United States; Bobby Clampett, John Cook, Scott Hoch & Jay Sigel
- 873 (+9)
- Location in the Pacific Ocean Location in Fiji

The 1978 Eisenhower Trophy took place 18 to 21 October at the Pacific Harbour Golf & Country Club in Navua, Viti Levu, Fiji. It was the 11th World Amateur Team Championship for the Eisenhower Trophy. The tournament was a 72-hole stroke play team event with 24 four-man teams. The best three scores for each round counted towards the team total.

United States won the Eisenhower Trophy for the seventh time, finishing 13 strokes ahead of the silver medalists, Canada. Australia took the bronze medal, five strokes further behind, while New Zealand finished fourth. Bobby Clampett, United States, had the lowest individual score, one-under-par 287.

After the 1974 Eisenhower Trophy was moved from Malaysia to the Dominican Republic, the 1978 event had been allocated to the Asia/Australasia zone with the 1980 event allocated to the American zone and the 1982 event to the Europe/Africa zone.

== Teams ==
24 teams contested the event. Each team except one had four players. The team representing South Korea had only three.

Country	Players
Argentina	Louis Carbonetti, Luis Daneri, Jorge Eiras, Oscar Vetere
Australia	Chris Bonython, Tony Gresham, Peter Sweeney, Phil Wood
Austria	Rudi Bondenseer, Max Lamberg, Johann Lamberg, Klaus Nierlich
Belgium	Benoit Dumont, Bruno Dupont, Thierry Goosens, Philippe Relecom
Bermuda	Lois Moniz, Kim Swan, Eric Hav Trott, Llewellyn Tucker
Brazil	Roberto Gomez, Rafael Gonzalez, Marco Ruberti, Marcello Stallone
Canada	Gary Cowan, Dave Mick, Doug Roxburgh, Yves Tremblay
Fiji	Rahim Buksh, Raymond Fisher, Eremasi Lutunatabua, Rafiq Mohammed
France	François Illouz, Jean Ignace Mouhica, Tim Planchin, Philippe Ploujoux
Great Britain & Ireland	Gordon Brand Jnr, Allan Brodie, Brian Marchbank, Peter McEvoy
Hong Kong	David Chan, Mark Chow, Yau Tak, Alex Tang
India	P. G. Sethi, Alan Singh, Lakshman Singh, Vikramjit Singh
Italy	Franco Gigliarelli, Antonio Lionello, Alberto Schiaffino, Lorenzo Silva
Japan	Ginjiro Nakabe, Tetsuo Sakata, Fuminori Sano, Masao Shioda
Netherlands	Barend van Dam, Jaap van Neck, Bart Nolte, Victor Swane
New Zealand	Geoff Clarke, Paul Hartstone, Phil Mosley, Frank Nobilo
Papua New Guinea	Greg Fennell, B. Giles, Tony Gover, John Keating, Jimmy Wu
South Korea	Chang Hwan Cho, Byong Hoon Kim, Dae Soon Kim
Spain	Gonzaga Escuariaza, Nicasio Sagardia, Roman Taya, Alfonso Vidaor
Sweden	Göran Lundquist, Jan Rube, Mikael Sorling, Björn Svedin
Switzerland	Francis Boillat, Marcus Frank, Yves Hofstetter, Johnny Storjohann
Thailand	Tamsak Ansusinha, Pratuang Nop-Ubol, Santa Pestonji, Thongplew Rungsang
United States	Bobby Clampett, John Cook, Scott Hoch, Jay Sigel
West Germany	Kai Flint, Thomas Hübner, Veit Pagel, Christian Strenger

== Scores ==
Place	Country	Score	To par
1st place, gold medalist(s)	United States	213-220-219-221=873	+9
2nd place, silver medalist(s)	Canada	222-222-225-217=886	+22
3rd place, bronze medalist(s)	Australia	222-223-224-222=891	+27
4	New Zealand	227-219-229-220=895	+31
5	Sweden	221-230-228-235=914	+50
6	Great Britain & Ireland	221-229-238-231=919	+55
7	France	230-236-236-221=923	+59
8	West Germany	231-240-229-233=933	+69
9	Japan	235-226-242-232=935	+71
T10	Italy	235-239-231-239=944	+80
T10	Spain	238-237-238-231=944	+80
12	Switzerland	235-240-236-234=945	+81
13	Argentina	245-241-233-230=949	+85
14	India	239-245-245-229=958	+94
15	Papua New Guinea	246-242-235-237=960	+96
16	Netherlands	239-250-234-240=963	+99
T17	Austria	239-252-240-238=969	+105
T17	Bermuda	238-243-243-245=969	+105
19	Brazil	247-244-236-245=972	+108
20	Belgium	243-251-245-241=980	+116
21	Thailand	249-245-248-240=982	+118
22	Fiji	252-250-243-240=985	+121
23	Hong Kong	254-243-240-249=986	+122
24	South Korea	254-254-245-248=1001	+137

== Individual leaders ==
There was no official recognition for the lowest individual scores.

Place	Player	Country	Score	To par
1	Bobby Clampett	United States	69-71-71-76=287	−1
2	Doug Roxburgh	Canada	72-74-74-69=289	+1
3	Geoff Clarke	New Zealand	71-76-72-71=290	+2
4	Gary Cowan	Canada	73-71-77-71=292	+4
5	John Cook	United States	75-73-73-72=293	+5
T6	Scott Hoch	United States	70-76-75-73=294	+6
T6	Peter Sweeney	Australia	76-73-71-74=294	+6
8	Tony Gresham	Australia	75-75-77-71=298	+10
T9	Phil Mosley	New Zealand	76-70-81-72=299	+11
T9	Mikael Sorling	Sweden	70-76-75-78=299	+11
