= Peter McEvoy =

English amateur golfer (1953–2025)

Peter McEvoy OBE
- McEvoy holding the Walker Cup in 2001

Personal information
- Full name: Peter Aloysius McEvoy
- Nationality: England
- Born: 22 March 1953 London, England
- Died: 6 April 2025 (aged 72)

Career
- Sport: Golf
- Status: Amateur

Best results in major championships
- Masters Tournament: 53rd: 1978
- PGA Championship: DNP
- U.S. Open: DNP
- The Open Championship: T17: 1979

Peter Aloysius McEvoy OBE (22 March 1953 – 6 April 2025) was a British amateur golfer for many years, and a golf course designer, golf administrator and golf writer.

== Early life ==
In 1953, McEvoy was born in London but spent much of his childhood living near Turnberry where his father was a member of the famous links course. Even after moving back to London, he was able to play at the famous course.

== Golf career ==
McEvoy won The Amateur Championship in both 1977 and 1978, which kicked off an impressive amateur golf career. He was a member of the Great Britain & Ireland Walker Cup team five times between 1977 and 1989. He also played on five Eisenhower Trophy teams, including 1988 when he won the individual event and GB&I won the team event. He was the low amateur at The Open Championship in 1978 and 1979, and was the first British amateur golfer to make the cut at the Masters Tournament, which he did in 1978. He also won the Lytham Trophy in 1979, the Brabazon Trophy in 1980 (tied with Ronan Rafferty), and was runner-up at the Amateur Championship in 1987.

McEvoy was named captain of the Great Britain & Ireland teams for the 1999 and 2001 Walker Cups, which won both times; this was the first time GB&I ever had consecutive wins in the event. McEvoy was also captain of the victorious Great Britain & Ireland team for the 1998 Eisenhower Trophy tournament, making McEvoy the only person to win the individual event, the team event as a player, and the team event as a captain. He captained again in 2000, and GB&I finished in second place. In 2002, when Ireland, England, Scotland, and Wales began sending separate teams to the tournament instead of a combined team, McEvoy was the captain of the English team.

McEvoy was involved with golf course design for over 20 years, with his own company and in collaboration with others. He worked on numerous courses around the world, including Fota Island Golf Course, which hosted the 2001 Irish Open and other Irish tournaments.

In 2002, McEvoy was named Chairman of The Royal and Ancient Golf Club of St Andrews Selection Committee, which chooses the members for Great Britain & Ireland amateur teams competing in various international events (such as the Walker Cup).

In February 2008, McEvoy devised and launched PowerPlay Golf, a shortened version of golf in a bid to create golf's version of Twenty20 cricket.

== Personal life ==
McEvoy lived in Tewkesbury, Gloucestershire, in England. He died on 6 April 2025, at the age of 72.

== Awards and honours ==
- In 1978, the Association of Golf Writers named McEvoy the winner of the Golf Writers' Trophy, after he won his second Amateur Championship and made the cut at the Masters. The trophy is "awarded each year to the individual, born or resident in Europe, or the European team, who have made the most outstanding contribution to golf in the preceding 12 months."
- In 1999, the English Golf Union named McEvoy as the winner of the Gerald Micklem Award, given to those who have "made an outstanding contribution to further the interests of amateur golf in England."
- In 2001, McEvoy won the Golf Writers' Trophy again as the award was given to the victorious 2001 Walker Cup team.
- In 2003, McEvoy was appointed an Officer of the Order of the British Empire (OBE) in the 2003 New Year Honours list, for "services to golf."

== Bibliography ==
- McEvoy, Peter (2006). For Love or Money. HarperSport. ISBN 978-0-00-720917-0.

== Results in major championships ==
Tournament	1976	1977	1978	1979	1980	1981	1982	1983	1984
Masters Tournament			53	CUT	CUT				
The Open Championship	CUT	CUT	T39 LA	T17 LA	CUT				WD

Note: McEvoy only played in the Masters Tournament and The Open Championship.

Did not play

LA = low amateur
CUT = missed the half-way cut
WD = withdrew
"T" indicates a tie for a place

== Team appearances ==
this list may be incomplete

- European Amateur Team Championship (representing England): 1977 (individual leader), 1979 (winners), 1981 (winners), 1983, 1985, 1987, 1989
- Walker Cup (representing Great Britain and Ireland): 1977, 1979, 1981, 1985, 1989 (winners), 1999 (non-playing captain), 2001 (non-playing captain)
- Eisenhower Trophy (representing Great Britain and Ireland): 1978, 1980, 1984, 1986, 1988 (team winners and individual leader)
- St Andrews Trophy (representing Great Britain and Ireland): 1978 (winners), 1980 (winners), 1984 (winners), 1986 (winners), 1988 (winners)
