= Mikael Sorling =

Swedish professional golfer

Personal information
- Full name: Nils Mikael Leslie Sorling
- Nationality: Sweden
- Born: 8 March 1953 (age 73) Malmö, Sweden
- Children: 3

Career
- Sport: Golf
- Turned professional: 1979
- Former tour: Swedish Golf Tour
- Professional wins: 5

Achievements and awards
- Swedish Golfer of the Year: 1977, 1978

Nils Mikael Leslie Sorling (born 8 March 1953) is a retired Swedish professional golfer and golf administrator. He won six Scandinavian titles as an amateur and was awarded Swedish Golfer of the Year in 1977 and 1978.

== Early life ==
Sorling grew up in Västerås in Västmanland, Sweden, as the oldest of two sons to his father Leslie, who was a dentist, and mother Margareta Sorling.

At four years of age, he first tried golf at Halmstad Golf Club, close to his family's summer house in Tylösand in the province of Halland in the south-west of Sweden. He continued to learn the game at Västerås Golf Club. During nine years in the 1970s, Sorlings father was chairman of the club and initiator of the development of the course, later earning him honorary membership of the club.

== Amateur career ==
Sorling was part of the Swedish teams capturing the silver medals at the European Youths' Team Championships in 1972 and 1973. In 1976 and 1977, Sorling was part of the three-man team representing Västerås Golf Club, winning the Swedish national amateur team championship. He again represented Sweden at the 1977 and 1979 European Amateur Team Championship. The Swedish team earned the silver medal in 1977.

Sorling is the only male player to have achieved the "Swedish amateur slam" by winning all three, at the time, major amateur tournaments in Sweden in the same year. In the summer of 1977, he won the Scandinavian Match-play, the Swedish Match-play and the Swedish International Stroke-play Championships within three months.

He also represented Sweden at the Eisenhower Trophy in 1972 in Buenos Aires, Argentina, 1976 at Penina GC in Algarve, Portugal and 1978 in Fiji. In 1978, the Swedish team finished an all-time best 5th and Sorling was best European individual scorer with a finish of tied 9th.

He made five starts in the Scandinavian Enterprise Open on the European Tour between 1976 and 1982 and finished as best home player, tied 34th, in 1979.

In 1977, 1978 and 1979, Sorling was ranked as the best male amateur golfer in Sweden by Svensk Golf, the official magazine of the Swedish Golf Federation.

== Professional career ==
From the position as one of the best amateur golfers in his country, Sorling turned professional in late 1979, with some intentions to join the pro tours, but soon enjoyed too much serving as a club professional at Halmstad Golf Club and skipped his international playing ambitions. However, he proved his playing skills by winning the Swedish PGA Club Pro Championship four years in a row 1986−1989. The first year, in 1986, as chairman of the PGA of Sweden tournament committee and winner of the championship at the same time, he was replaced as giver of the trophy at the prize ceremony.

== Affiliations ==
Sorling was a member of the board of the PGA of Sweden 1982-1989 and 1996. He has been a member of the board of the Swedish Golf Tour and the board of PGA Sweden Events.

Sorling served as general manager at PGA of Sweden for 22 years from 1997 until his retirement in 2019. He has also been a member of the Ryder Cup board, Chairman of the Ryder Cup European Development Trust, and Vice President of PGAs of Europe. Sorling championed construction of the PGA Sweden National championship golf course, near Malmö.

== Private life ==
Since January 1976, during the most successful part of his amateur career, Sorling lived in Malmö and worked as a salesman of Power-Built and Burton golf equipment, from previously has been combining elite golf with work at a bank in Västerås.

== Awards and honors ==
- 1972 Most Promising Golfer in Sweden by Zindermans Publishing House
- 1977 Elit Sign No. 62 by the Swedish Golf Federation
- 1977, 1978 Swedish Golfer of the Year
- 1988 PGA of Sweden Merit Sign in Gold
- 2007 The Golden Club by the Swedish Golf Federation
- 2019 Honorary Member of the PGA of Sweden

== Amateur wins ==
- 1976 Scandinavian International Match-play Championship
- 1977 Scandinavian International Match-play Championship, Swedish Matchplay Championship, Swedish International Stroke Play Championship
- 1978 Scandinavian International Match-play Championship, Swedish Matchplay Championship

== Professional wins (5) ==
No.	Date	Tournament	Winning score	Margin of victory	Runner-up	Winner's share (SEK)
1	11 Oct 1986	Sweden PGA Club Pro Championship BMW Open	−2 (71-70-73=214)	6 strokes	(Egypt) Abdel Halim	18,000
2	10 Oct 1987	Sweden PGA Club Pro Championship BMW Open	+8 (77-74-73=224)	1 stroke	(New Zealand) Peter Hamblett	22,500
3	30 Sep 1988	Sweden PGA Club Pro Championship BMW Open	E (73-74-69=216)	2 strokes	(Sweden) Toni Lundahl	22,500
4	29 Sep 1989	Sweden PGA Club Pro Championship BMW Open	−1 (70-72-70=212)	2 strokes	(England) David Nicholson	22,500
5	2005	Sweden PGA Club Pro Championship Senior Category				

== Team appearances ==
Amateur

- EGA Trophy (representing the Continent of Europe): 1972
- Eisenhower Trophy (representing Sweden): 1972, 1976, 1978
- European Youths' Team Championship (representing Sweden): 1972, 1973
- European Amateur Team Championship (representing Sweden): 1977, 1979
- St Andrews Trophy (representing the Continent of Europe): 1978
