= Duncan Evans =

Welsh golfer (born 1959)

Duncan Evans (born January 1959 in Crewe, Cheshire, England) is a Welsh amateur golfer who won The Amateur Championship at the Royal Porthcawl Golf Club in 1980. Evans was the first Welshman to win the championship and that year his achievement was recognised when he was made BBC Wales Sports Personality of the Year.

== Golfing career ==
In 1980, Evans became the first person from Wales to win the Amateur Championship, which was played in heavy rain at the Royal Porthcawl Golf Club.

Evans represented Great Britain and Ireland in the 1981 Walker Cup at Cypress Point Club in California. He played in three matches; winning one, losing one with one halved. He played in two Open Championships, the 1980 at Muirfield and the 1981 at Royal St George's. Evans missed the halfway cut in 1980 and the third round cut in 1981.

== Personal history ==
In 2009, Evans was imprisoned for four years for his involvement in a £3.5 million Value Added Tax scam.

== Team appearances ==
Amateur

- St Andrews Trophy (representing Great Britain and Ireland): 1980 (winners)
- European Amateur Team Championship (representing Wales): 1981
- Walker Cup (representing Great Britain & Ireland): 1981
