= 1976 Eisenhower Trophy =

Coordinates: 37.161°N 8.581°W

Tournament information
- Dates: 13–16 October
- Location: Portimão, Algarve, Portugal
- Course: Penina Golf Club
- Format: 72 holes stroke play

Statistics
- Par: 73
- Length: 6,940 yards (6,350 m)
- Field: 38 teams 152 players

Champion
- Great Britain & Ireland; John Davies, Ian Hutcheon, Michael Kelley & Steve Martin
- 892 (+16)

The 1976 Eisenhower Trophy took place from 13 to 16 October at the Penina Hotel & Golf Resort in Portimão, Algarve, Portugal. It was the tenth World Amateur Team Championship for the Eisenhower Trophy. The tournament was a 72-hole stroke play team event with 38 four-man teams. The best three scores for each round counted towards the team total.

Great Britain and Ireland won the Eisenhower Trophy for the second time, finishing two strokes ahead of the silver medalists, Japan, who had also been runners-up in 1974. Australia took the bronze medal, three strokes further behind, while team of Republic of China finished fourth. Chen Tze-ming from the Republic of China and Ian Hutcheon, representing Great Britain and Ireland, had the lowest individual scores, one-over-par 293.

== Teams ==
38 four-man teams contested the event.

Country	Players
Argentina	Horacio Carbonetti, Louis Carbonetti, Roberto Monguzzi, Jorge Ocampo
Australia	Chris Bonython, Tony Gresham, Colin Kaye, Phil Wood
Austria	Max Lamberg, Franz Laimer, Klaus Nierlich, Florian Stolz
Bahamas	Robert Slatter, Brendan Lynch, Basil Smith, Michael Taylor
Belgium	Benoit Dumont, Yves Maham, Fredric Rodesch, Jean Rolin
Bermuda	Brendam Ingham, Blake Marshall, Lois Moniz, Hav Trott
Brazil	Priscillo Diniz, Jaime Gonzalez, Rafael Navarro, Ricardo Rossi
Canada	Keith Alexander, Robbie Jackson, Jim Nelford, Doug Roxburgh
Chile	Thomas Boetigger, Michael Grasty, Ricardo Orelana, Felipe Taverne
Costa Rica	Ramon Jimenez, Xavier Gonzalez, Enrique Herrero, Arturo Montealegre
Denmark	Lars Jacobsen, Henry Knudsen, Ryan Olsen, Ole Wiberg
Dominican Republic	Jack Corrie, Luis F. Henriquez, José B. Lahoz, Salomom Melgen
El Salvador	Guillermo Aceto, Mauricio Alvarez, José Maria Duran, Carlos M. Guardin
Finland	Patrik Hallamaa, Harry Safonoff, Kari Salonen, Timo Sipponen
France	Alexis Godillot, Patrick Lemaire, Tim Planchin, Philippe Ploujoux
Great Britain & Ireland	John Davies, Ian Hutcheon, Michael Kelley, Steve Martin
Israel	Laurie Been, Jonathan Eting, Barry Mandel, Neil Shochet
Italy	Stefano Betti, Massimo Mannelli, Lorenzo Silva, Giuseppe Sita
Japan	Ginjiro Nakabe, Micho Mori, Tetsuo Sakata, Masahiro Kuramoto
Malaysia	Eshak Bluah, Tan Yee Khanl, Nazamuddin Yusuf, Sahabuddin Yusof
Mexico	Rafael Alarcón, Juan A. Estrado, Roberto Lebrija, José Martinez
Netherlands	Carel Braun, Barend van Dam, Jaap van Neck, Victor Swane
New Zealand	Peter Burney, Alex Bonnington, Geoff Clarke, Ted McDougall
Norway	Per Berge, Erik Dønnestad, Asbjørn Ramnefjell, Alexander Vik
Papua New Guinea	John Keating, Greg Fennell, Phil Frame, Tony Gover
Portugal	Nuno A. de Brito a Cunha, Pedro d'Hommee Caupers, Jorge Soares, José Lara de Sousa e Melo
Puerto Rico	Carlos Bolivar, Joe Passarel, James Teale, Fred Thon
Rhodesia	George Harvey, Tony Johnstone, Nick Price, Teddy Webber
South Africa	Gavan Levenson, Robbie Stewart, David Suddards, Peter Todt
South Korea	Chang Whan Cho, Mi Rang Kim, Yung Chang Kim, Chong Min Lee
Spain	Santiago Fernandez, José Gancedo, Eduardo de la Riva, Snr, Roman Taya
Sri Lanka	W.J. Barsenbach, F.E. Captein, W.P. Fernando, C. Thural Rahaj
Sweden	Hans Hedjerson, Göran Lundquist, Jan Rube, Mikael Sorling
Switzerland	Michael Rey, Tommy Fortmann, Yves Hofstetter, Johnny Storjohann
Taiwan	Chen Tze-chung, Chen Tze-ming, Lu Hsi-chuen, Shen Chung-shyan
United States	John Fought, Fred Ridley, Bill Sander, Dick Siderowf
Venezuela	Jonathan Coles, Gustavo Larrazabal, Carlos Plaza, Carlos Whaite
West Germany	Jan G. Müller, Veit Pagel, Christoph Stadler, Christian Strenger

== Scores ==
Place	Country	Score	To par
1st place, gold medalist(s)	Great Britain & Ireland	219-224-225-224=892	+16
2nd place, silver medalist(s)	Japan	227-220-223-224=894	+18
3rd place, bronze medalist(s)	Australia	230-220-220-227=897	+21
4	China	229-221-223-225=898	+22
5	United States	224-229-217-231=901	+25
6	Canada	227-226-225-228=906	+30
7	Sweden	223-229-232-227=911	+35
8	South Africa	219-224-239-230=912	+36
T9	Rhodesia	223-228-226-237=914	+38
T9	Switzerland	226-227-227-234=914	+38
11	Argentina	230-230-230-232=922	+46
12	New Zealand	224-233-228-238=923	+47
13	France	230-234-233-233=930	+54
14	Mexico	235-236-235-229=935	+59
15	Spain	233-236-238-230=937	+61
16	Brazil	235-234-231-239=939	+63
17	Chile	237-238-232-234=941	+65
T18	Italy	242-235-232-235=944	+68
T18	Papua New Guinea	239-237-237-231=944	+68
20	Denmark	238-237-233-238=946	+70
T21	South Korea	236-238-239-234=947	+71
T21	Norway	231-236-235-245=947	+71
23	West Germany	235-230-246-238=949	+73
24	Malaysia	241-233-236-240=950	+74
25	Belgium	231-242-240-242=955	+79
T26	Austria	238-242-244-240=964	+88
T26	Finland	243-235-242-244=964	+88
28	Netherlands	241-245-244-236=966	+90
T29	Bermuda	242-240-241-251=974	+98
T29	Venezuela	241-247-243-243=974	+98
31	Portugal	248-241-245-243=977	+101
32	Israel	248-252-250-252=1002	+126
33	Dominican Republic	248-260-252-251=1011	+135
34	Sri Lanka	265-250-248-257=1020	+144
35	Bahamas	254-265-270-253=1042	+166
36	El Salvador	256-266-263-262=1047	+171
37	Costa Rica	256-272-269-281=1078	+202
38	Puerto Rico	274-281-260-264=1079	+203

== Individual leaders ==
There was no official recognition for the lowest individual scores.

Place	Player	Country	Score	To par
T1	Chen Tze-ming	China	75-69-73-76=293	+1
T1	Ian Hutcheon	Great Britain & Ireland	73-73-76-71=293	+1
T3	Masahiro Kuramoto	Japan	75-71-75-73=294	+2
T3	Phil Wood	Australia	76-70-76-72=294	+2
5	Keith Alexander	Canada	75-72-75-75=297	+5
T6	Fred Ridley	United States	74-77-70-77=298	+6
T6	Teddy Webber	Rhodesia	71-76-76-75=298	+6
T8	John Fought	United States	72-73-76-78=299	+7
T8	Michael Rey	Switzerland	73-73-75-78=299	+7
T10	Jaime Gonzalez	Brazil	77-78-70-76=301	+9
T10	Michael Kelley	Great Britain & Ireland	72-76-75-78=301	+9
