= Brian Marchbank =

Scottish golfer

Personal information
- Nationality: Scotland
- Born: 20 April 1958 (age 68) Perth, Scotland
- Height: 1.73 m (5 ft 8 in)
- Weight: 76 kg (168 lb; 12.0 st)

Career
- Sport: Golf
- Turned professional: 1979
- Former tours: European Tour; European Seniors Tour
- Professional wins: 4

Best results in major championships
- Masters Tournament: DNP
- PGA Championship: DNP
- U.S. Open: DNP
- The Open Championship: T8: 1986

Brian Marchbank (born 20 April 1958) is a Scottish professional golfer. He had a successful amateur career in which he won Boys Amateur Championship and the British Youths Open Championship and played in the 1979 Walker Cup. He made over 400 appearances on European Tour without winning, his best finish being when he was runner-up in the 1982 State Express English Classic.

== Amateur career ==
Marchbank was a successful amateur golfer. In 1975 he won the Boys Amateur Championship at Bruntsfield Links, beating Sandy Lyle by one hole in the 36-hole final, making a 12-foot birdie putt at the final hole. In 1978 Marchbank won the Lytham Trophy. He led by 5 strokes after three rounds and, despite a final round of 77, won by three strokes from Peter Thomas. Later in the year he won the British Youths Open Championship, with two rounds of 68 on the final day giving him the championship by three strokes from Hugh Evans. Marchbank played in the 1979 Walker Cup. He won two of his four matches, winning his singles on the opening day but losing to Hal Sutton in the final-day singles.

== Professional career ==
Marchbank turned professional in 1979, making his debut in the Scottish PGA Championship in early September. He made his debut on the European Tour in late 1979 and was a regular competitor until the end of the 1996 season, making over 400 appearances. He never won an official European Tour event although he won the Equity & Law Challenge, an unofficial-money event on the tour, two years in succession. His best finish in an official event was second in the 1982 State Express English Classic at The Belfry, one stroke behind Greg Norman. On the final day Marchbank finished with three birdies in the last four holes for a round of 67, the lowest of the day. Marchbank played in 12 Open Championships, with a best finish in 1986 at Turnberry, when he finished in a tie for 8th place. He had an opening round of 78 but his final three rounds of 70, 72 and 69 were better than anyone else, except the winner Greg Norman.

== Personal life ==
Marchbank's father Ian (1931–2019) was also a golfer and was the professional at Gleneagles for many years.

== Amateur wins ==
- 1975 Boys Amateur Championship
- 1978 Lytham Trophy, British Youths Open Amateur Championship

== Professional wins (4) ==
- 1980 Scottish Under-25 Championship
- 1990 Equity & Law Challenge
- 1991 Equity & Law Challenge
- 1996 Scottish PGA Championship

== Results in major championships ==
Tournament	1980	1981	1982	1983	1984	1985	1986	1987	1988	1989	1990	1991	1992	1993	1994	1995	1996	1997	1998	1999	2000
The Open Championship	CUT		CUT		CUT	CUT	T8	T44	T38	T30		T92	T45		T38						CUT

Note: Marchbank only played in The Open Championship.

Top 10
Did not play

CUT = Missed the cut (3rd round cut in 1980 and 1984 Open Championships)
"T" indicates a tie for a place

== Team appearances ==
Amateur

- Eisenhower Trophy (representing Great Britain & Ireland): 1978
- European Amateur Team Championship (representing Scotland): 1979
- Walker Cup (representing Great Britain & Ireland): 1979
- St Andrews Trophy (representing Great Britain & Ireland): 1976 (winners), 1978 (winners)
