= EGA Trophy =

Former golf competition

The EGA Trophy was an annual amateur boys' under-21 team golf competition between Great Britain & Ireland and the Continent of Europe.

== History ==
The match was instituted in 1967 and played every year until it was discontinued in 1994. The first time the Continental team won was when it was held in Sweden in 1980. Initially the event was held on the day before the start of the British Youths Open Championship. There were 5 foursomes matches in the morning and 10 singles in the afternoon. After 1985, the venue generally alternated between Great Britain and the continent.

== Format ==
The teams tournament was played over two days, with foursomes in the morning and singles matches in the afternoon. The Great Britain and Ireland team was selected by The Royal and Ancient Golf Club and the Continent of Europe side by the European Golf Association.

== Results ==
The Great Britain & Ireland team won the event 25 times, while Continental Europe has 3 victories. The 1984 match ended in a tie, so Great Britain & Ireland retained the trophy. The 1981 match was shortened due to adverse weather conditions.

Year	Venue	Winning team	Score		Losing team	Ref
1994	Golf Club de Pan, Utrecht, Netherlands	Great Britain (United Kingdom) & Ireland (Republic of Ireland)	18	6	Continental Europe	
1993	Royal Troon, Scotland	Great Britain (United Kingdom) & Ireland (Republic of Ireland)	16	8	Continental Europe	
1992	Club zur Vahr, Bremen, Germany	Continental Europe	14	10	Great Britain (United Kingdom) & Ireland (Republic of Ireland)	
1991	Dalmahoy, Scotland	Great Britain (United Kingdom) & Ireland (Republic of Ireland)	14 1/2	9 1/2	Continental Europe	
1990	Porto, Portugal	Great Britain (United Kingdom) & Ireland (Republic of Ireland)	14 1/2	9 1/2	Continental Europe	
1989	Ashburnham, Wales	Great Britain (United Kingdom) & Ireland (Republic of Ireland)	8 1/2	3 1/2	Continental Europe	
1988	Copenhagen, Denmark	Great Britain (United Kingdom) & Ireland (Republic of Ireland)	13 1/2	10 1/2	Continental Europe	
1987	Notts Golf Club, England	Continental Europe	7	5	Great Britain (United Kingdom) & Ireland (Republic of Ireland)	
1986	La Galea, Bilbao, Spain	Great Britain (United Kingdom) & Ireland (Republic of Ireland)	13 1/2	10 1/2	Continental Europe	
1985	Ganton, England	Great Britain (United Kingdom) & Ireland (Republic of Ireland)	8	4	Continental Europe	
1984	Blairgowrie, Scotland	Great Britain (United Kingdom) & Ireland (Republic of Ireland)	6	6	Continental Europe	
1983	Punta Ala, Italy	Great Britain (United Kingdom) & Ireland (Republic of Ireland)	13	11	Continental Europe	
1982	St Andrews New Course, Scotland	Great Britain (United Kingdom) & Ireland (Republic of Ireland)	7 1/2	4 1/2	Continental Europe	
1981	West Lancashire, England	Great Britain (United Kingdom) & Ireland (Republic of Ireland)	7 1/2	4 1/2	Continental Europe	
1980	Akademiska, Lund, Sweden	Continental Europe	13	11	Great Britain (United Kingdom) & Ireland (Republic of Ireland)	
1979	Woodhall Spa, England	Great Britain (United Kingdom) & Ireland (Republic of Ireland)	12	3	Continental Europe	
1978	East Renfrewshire, Scotland	Great Britain (United Kingdom) & Ireland (Republic of Ireland)	12 1/2	2 1/2	Continental Europe	
1977	Moor Park Golf Club, England	Great Britain (United Kingdom) & Ireland (Republic of Ireland)	11 1/2	3 1/2	Continental Europe	
1976	Chantilly, Oise, France	Great Britain (United Kingdom) & Ireland (Republic of Ireland)	17	13	Continental Europe	
1975	Pannal, England	Great Britain (United Kingdom) & Ireland (Republic of Ireland)	9	6	Continental Europe	
1974	Downfield, Scotland	Great Britain (United Kingdom) & Ireland (Republic of Ireland)	10	5	Continental Europe	
1973	Southport & Ainsdale GC, England	Great Britain (United Kingdom) & Ireland (Republic of Ireland)	10	3	Continental Europe	
1972	Glasgow Gailes GC, Scotland	Great Britain (United Kingdom) & Ireland (Republic of Ireland)	11 1/2	3 1/2	Continental Europe	
1971	Northampton Golf Club, England	Great Britain (United Kingdom) & Ireland (Republic of Ireland)	10	5	Continental Europe	
1970	Barnton, Scotland	Great Britain (United Kingdom) & Ireland (Republic of Ireland)	10 1/2	4 1/2	Continental Europe	
1969	Lindrick Golf Club, England	Great Britain (United Kingdom) & Ireland (Republic of Ireland)	13 1/2	1 1/2	Continental Europe	
1968	Belleisle Golf Club, Ayr, Scotland	Great Britain (United Kingdom) & Ireland (Republic of Ireland)	11	4	Continental Europe	
1967	Copt Heath Golf Club, Solihull, England	Great Britain (United Kingdom) & Ireland (Republic of Ireland)	8	7	Continental Europe	

== Teams ==
=== Great Britain & Ireland ===
- 1967 Peter Benka, Allan Brodie, Andrew Brooks, John Cook, Bob Durrant, Alan Holmes, Bill Lockie, Peter Oosterhuis, Tony Thornley, John Threlfall, Steve Warrin
- 1968 Peter Benka, Andrew Brooks, Bill Davidson, Bob Durrant, Peter Hedges, Sandy Horne, Bill Lockie, Peter Oosterhuis, Peter Tupling, Martin Walters
- 1969 John Cook, Peter Dawson, John Davies, Bob Durrant, Andrew Forrester, Warren Humphreys, Bill Lockie, Doug McClelland, George McKay
- 1970 Peter Berry, Bobby Blackwood, Roddy Carr, Jim Farmer, Warren Humphreys, Michael King, John McTear, John O'Leary, Steve Rolley, Alistair Thomson
- 1971 Peter Berry, Roddy Carr, David Chillas, Simon Cox, Mark Gannon, Barclay Howard, Warren Humphreys, Michael King, Ian Mosey, Ian Ritchie
- 1972 Peter Berry, Clive Brown, Simon Cox, Pip Elson, Barclay Howard, Carl Mason, Willie Milne, Ian Mosey, Roger Revell, Sandy Stephen
- 1973 Andrew Chandler, Howard Clark, Simon Cox, Martin Foster, Barclay Howard, Garry Logan, Carl Mason, John Putt, David Robertson, Sandy Stephen
- 1974 Nigel Burch, Andrew Chandler, John Downie, Richard Eyles, Garry Harvey, Barclay Howard, Mark James, Martin Poxon, David Robertson, Sandy Stephen
- 1975 Nigel Burch, Nick Faldo, Garry Harvey, Mark James, Sandy Lyle, Steve Martin, Peter Deeble, Martin Poxon, Sandy Stephen, Peter Wilson
- 1976 Gordon J. Brand, Paul Downes, Malcolm Lewis, Sandy Lyle, Brian Marchbank, Steve Martin, Paul McKellar, Chris Mitchell, Martin Poxon, Hogan Stott, Peter Wilson
- 1977 John Cuddihy, Paul Downes, Malcolm Lewis, Sandy Lyle, Brian Marchbank, Steve Martin, Paul McKellar, Hogan Stott, Grant Turner, Alastair Webster
- 1978 Gordon Brand Jnr, Paul Carrigill, John Cuddihy, Paul Downes, Hugh Evans, Paul Hoad, Brian Marchbank, Alistair Taylor, Keith Waters, Alastair Webster
- 1979 Gordon Brand Jnr, Roger Chapman, Paul Downes, Haydn Green, Garry Hay, Paul Hoad, Brian Marchbank, Jonathan Morrow, Stuart Taylor, David Williams
- 1980 Roger Chapman, Paul Downes, Duncan Evans, Garry Hay, Jonathan Morrow, Ronan Rafferty, Stuart Taylor, Philip Walton (selected team)
- 1981 George Barrie, David Blakeman, Richard Boxall, Frank Coutts, Paul Downes, John Huggan, Jonathan Morrow, Ian Young
- 1982 Colin Dalgleish, Campbell Elliott, Stephen Keppler, Lindsay Mann, Philip Parkin, David Ray, Martin Thompson, David Wood
- 1983 Neil Anderson, David Gilford, Craig Laurence, Lindsay Mann, Paul Mayo, Stephen McAllister, Maurice Moir, Roger Roper, Ernie Wilson
- 1984 Colin Brooks, Mark Davis, David Gilford, Craig Laurence, Paul Mayo, Maurice Moir, Colin Montgomerie, Neil Roderick
- 1985 Steven Bottomley, Colin Brooks, Stephen Easingwood, Freddie George, Emyr Jones, Eoghan O'Connell, Kenny Walker, Roger Winchester
- 1986 Paul Girvan, Richard Muscroft, Phillip Price, Steven Richardson, Alex Robertson, Jeremy Robinson, Neil Roderick, Bryan Shields, Kenny Walker
- 1987 Jim Fleming, Andrew Hare, Bradley Knight, Gary Orr, Phillip Price, Alan Tait, Alasdair Watt, Roger Winchester
- 1988 Stuart Bannerman, Darren Clarke, Andrew Coltart, James Cook, Craig Everett, Ken Kearney, James Lee, Darren Prosser, Alan Tait
- 1989 Andrew Coltart, Andrew Elliot, David Errity, Gary Evans, Keith Jones, James Lee, Euan McIntosh, Jim Payne, Mike Smith
- 1990 David Bathgate, Andrew Coltart, Ian Garbutt, Pádraig Harrington, Richard Johnson, Andrew Jones, Simon Mackenzie, Gary McNeill, Jim Payne
- 1991 Andrew Barnett, Ian Garbutt, Pádraig Harrington, Martin Hastie, Garry Houston, Raife Hutt, Andrew Jones, Nick Ludwell, Dean Robertson
- 1992 Warren Bennett, Raymond Burns, Richie Coughlan, Richard Dinsdale, Bradley Dredge, Ian Garbutt, Pádraig Harrington, Mark Pullan, Raymond Russell
- 1993 Raymond Burns, Stuart Cage, Bradley Dredge, Richard Johnson, Gary Murphy, Van Phillips, Iain Pyman, Alan Reid, Raymond Russell
- 1994 Richard Bland, Richie Coughlan, David Downie, Bradley Dredge, Scott Drummond, Stephen Gallacher, Lee S. James, Keith Nolan, Gordon Sherry

=== Continental Europe ===
This list is incomplete

- 1984 Alberto Binaghi, Thomas Dekorsy, Marco Durante, Emmanuel Dussart, Ignacio Gervás, Enrico Nistri, José María Olazábal, Sergio Prati
- 1985 Alberto Binaghi, H Erickson, Ignacio Gervás, Adam Mednick, Olle Nordberg, José María Olazábal, Ekkehart Schieffer, Jean van de Velde
- 1986 Stephen Lindskog, Yago Beamonte, H Erikson, Laurent Lasalle, F Ortiz, Ángel Sartorius, Sven Strüver, Jean van de Velde, Ulrich Zilg
- 1987 Jesús María Arruti, Patrice Barquez, Éric Giraud, Per-Ulrik Johansson, Thomas Levet, Olle Nordberg, Antonio Reale, Sven Strüver
- 1988 Jesús María Arruti, José Manuel Arruti, Patrice Barquez, Éric Giraud, Jakob Greisen, Joakim Haeggman, Thomas Levet, Paolo Quirici, Constant Smits van Waesberghe
- 1989 José Manuel Arruti, Patrice Barquez, Christian Cévaër, Massimo Florioli, Éric Giraud, Jakob Greisen, Robert Karlsson, Jan-Erik Schapmann
- 1990 Carlos Beautell, Diego Borrego, Emanuele Canonica, Christian Cévaër, Olivier Edmond, Massimo Florioli, Jakob Greisen, Christophe Pottier, Jan-Erik Schapmann
- 1991 Carlos Beautell, Dimitri Bieri, Diego Borrego, Frédéric Cupillard, Klas Eriksson, Massimo Florioli, Marco Gortana, Pehr Magnebrant, Massimo Scarpa
- 1992 Fredrik Andersson, Max Anglert, Thomas Bjørn, Diego Borrego, Frédéric Cupillard, Niclas Fasth, Ignacio Garrido, Tomás Jesus Muñoz, Kalle Väinölä
- 1993 Carlos Beautell, Jan Dahlström, Jean-Yann Dusson, Freddie Jacobson, Mikael Lundberg, Rudi Sailer, Fabrice Stolear, Francisco Valera, Nicolas Vanhootegem
- 1994 Kalle Brink, Eric Carlberg, Francisco Cea, Diego Dupin, Viktor Gustavsson, Morten Hagen, Mika Lehtinen, Mikael Lundberg, Niki Zitny

== See also ==
- St Andrews Trophy – the equivalent men's event
- Jacques Léglise Trophy – the equivalent boys under-18 event
