= Svensk Golf =

Swedish golf magazine

- Former editors: Göran Zachrisson
- Categories: Golf magazine
- Frequency: Ten times yearly
- Publisher: Egmont Publishing
- Founded: 1946; 79 years ago
- Company: Egmont Group
- Country: Sweden
- Language: Swedish
- Website: Svensk Golf

Svensk Golf is a Swedish language golf magazine that has published since 1946. It is one of the most read magazines in Sweden.

== History and profile ==
Svensk Golf was launched in 1946. The Swedish Golf Association acquired the magazine in 1964. The Association sold the magazine to Egmont Group in 2015, and the publisher has been Egmont Publishing. From 1965 to 1 June 2020 it was sent out to all members of Swedish Golf Association. Then the magazine became a paid magazine.

Svensk Golf is published ten times a year and covers the equipment tests, international golf destinations and the reports from Swedish golf courses. It also features interviews with leading golfers.

At the beginning of the 1960s the editor-in-chief of Svensk Golf was Göran Zachrisson. As of 2021 Oskar Åsgård is the editor-in-chief of the magazine.
