= 1973 European Amateur Team Championship =

Golf competition

Tournament information
- Dates: 28 June – 1 July 1973
- Location: Portimão, Algarve, Portugal; 37.161°N 8.581°W
- Courses: Penina Golf & Resort
- Organized by: European Golf Association
- Format: Qualification round: 18 holes stroke play Knock-out match-play

Statistics
- Par: 73
- Length: 6,940 yards (6,350 m)
- Field: 18 teams circa 108 players

Champion
- England; John Davies, Rodney Foster, Peter Hedges, Trevor Homer, Michael King, Roger Revell
- Qualification round: 376 (+11); Final: 4–3

Location map
- Location in Europe Location in Portugal

The 1973 European Amateur Team Championship took place 28 June – 1 July at Penina Golf & Resort in Portimão, Algarve, Portugal. It was the eighth men's golf European Amateur Team Championship.

== Venue ==
The tournament was played at the resort's 18-hole Championship Course, originally called The Penina, founded by John Stilwell and designed by Sir Henry Cotton. The course was set up with par 35 over the first nine holes and par 38 on the second nine, finishing with two par 5 holes.

The weather was warm and sunny during the whole tournament.

== Format ==
All participating teams played one qualification round of stroke-play with six players, counted the five best scores for each team.

The eight best teams formed flight A, in knock-out match-play over the next three days. The teams were seeded based on their positions after the stroke play. The first placed team were drawn to play the quarter final against the eight placed team, the second against the seventh, the third against the sixth and the fourth against the fifth. In each match between two nation teams, two 18-hole foursome games and five 18-hole single games were played. Teams were allowed to use six players during the team matches, selecting four of them in the morning foursome matches and five players in to the afternoon single matches.

The six teams placed 9–14 in the qualification stroke-play formed Flight B to play similar knock-out play and the four teams placed 15–18 formed Flight C to meet each other, to decide their final positions.

== Teams ==
18 nation teams contested the event. Each team consisted of six players.

Country	Players
Austria	Johann Egger, Michel Kotchwar, Ekki Lantschner, Peter Nierlich, Helmuth Reichel, Lampert Stolz
Belgium	John Bigwood, Yves Brose, Michel Eaton, Yves Mahain, Freddy Rodesch, Jean Rolin
Denmark	Kjeld Friche, Klaus Hove, Henry Knudsen, John Nielsen, Hans Stenderup, Ole Wiberg-Jørgensen
England	John Davies, Rodney Foster, Peter Hedges, Trevor Homer, Michael King, Roger Revell
Finland	Asko Arkola, Juhani Hämäläinen, Harry Safonoff, Kari Salonen, Juha Utter, Lauri Wirkala
France	Patrick Cotton, Hervé Frayssineau, Alexis Godillot, Roger Lagarde, George Leven, Philippe Ploujoux
Iceland	Torbjörn Kjaerbo, Einar Gudnason, J. Guomundsson, Lofter Olafsson, Björgvin Thorsteinsson, Ottar Yngvarson
Ireland	David Corcoran, Hugh MacKeown, Vincent Nevin, Robert Pollin, Des Smyth, Rupert Staunton
Italy	Alberto Croze, Franco Gigliarelli, Delio Lovato, Alberto Schiaffino, Lorenzo Silva, Carlo Tadini
Netherlands	Carel Braun, Lout Meertens, Jaap van Neck, Teun Rozenburg, Piet-Hein Streutgers, Victor Swane
Norway	Per Aarum, Erik Dønnestad, Petter Dønnestad, Yngve Eriksen, Johan Horn, Christian Staubo
Portugal	Rodrico M. Bivar, Nuno A. de Brito a Cunha, Pedro d'Hommee Caupers, Antonio Carmona Santos, Jorge H. Soares, José Lara de Sousa e Melo
Scotland	Allan Brodie, Charlie Green, Ian Hutcheon, George MacGregor, Willie Milne, Hugh Stuart
Spain	Santiago Fernández, José Gancedo, Nicasio Sagardia, Francisco Sanchiz, Miguel Taya, Román Taya
Sweden	Olle Dahlgren, Jan Grönkwist, Hans Hedjerson, Staffan Mannerström, Jan Rube, Per-Roland Quist
Switzerland	Yves Hofstetter, Martin Kessler, Uli Lamm, Jürg Pesko, Michel Rey, Johnny Storjohann
Wales	Clive Brown, Simon Cox, Ted Davies, John Roger Jones, Jeff Toye, John Povall
West Germany	Heinrich Adam, Hans Lampert, Christoph Städler, Veit Pagel, Jürgen Weghmann

== Winners ==
Defending champions England won the gold medal, earning their fourth title, beating, just as at the previous event, Scotland in the final, this time with 4–3. Team Sweden, earned the bronze on third place, after beating Spain 4–3 in the bronze match.

Individual leaders in the opening 18-hole stroke-play qualifying competition was John Davies, England, Yves Hofstetter, Switzerland and Willie Milne, Scotland, tied first, each with a score of 2-under-par 71. There was no official award for the lowest individual scores.

== Results ==
Qualification round

Team standings

Place	Country	Score	To par
1	Scotland	374	+9
2	England	376	+11
3	France	377	+12
4	Sweden	378	+13
5	Switzerland	381	+16
6	Spain	389	+24
7	Wales	390	+25
8	West Germany	391	+26
9	Denmark	395	+30
10	Italy	396	+31
11	Ireland	398	+33
12	Finland	399	+34
13	Netherlands	403	+38
14	Norway	407	+42
15	Belgium	409	+44
16	Portugal	414	+49
T17	Austria *	429	+64
T17	Iceland	429	+64

* Note: In the event of a tie the order was determined by the better non-counting score.

Individual leaders

Place	Player	Country	Score	To par
T1	John Davies	England	71	−2
T1	Yves Hofstetter	Switzerland	71	−2
T1	Willie Milne	Scotland	71	−2
T4	Hans Hedjerson	Sweden	72	−1
T4	Charlie Green	Scotland	72	−1
T6	Rodney Foster	England	73	E
T6	Alexis Godillot	France	73	E
T6	Kari Salonen	Finland	73	E
T6	Román Taya	Spain	73	E
10	Philippe Ploujoux	France	74	+1

Note: There was no official award for the lowest individual scores.

Flight A

Bracket

Quarter finals
England	5
Wales	2
Spain	4
France	3
Sweden	4
Switzerland	3
Scotland	7
West Germany	0

Semi finals
England	6
Spain	1
Scotland	5
Sweden	2

Final
England	4
Scotland	3
Bronze match
Sweden	4
Spain	3

Elimination matches
France	4.5
Wales	2.5
Switzerland	4.5
West Germany	2.5

Match for 5th place
France	5.5
Switzerland	1.5
Match for 7th place
West Germany	5.5
Wales	1.5

Final games

England	Scotland
4	3
P. Hedges / M. King 7 & 6	H. Stuart / W. Milne
R. Foster / T. Homer 20th	C. Green / G. MacGregor
John Davies	Hugh Stuart 3 & 2
Rodney Foster 2 & 1	Charlie Green
Michael King	Willie Milne 1 hole
Peter Hedges 2 & 1	George MacGregor
Trevor Homer	Ian Hurcheon 3 & 2

Flight B

Elimination matches

Norway	Ireland
4	3

Netherlands	Finland
4	3

Norway	Italy
4	3

Denmark	Netherlands
6	1

Match for 13th place

Ireland	Finland
5	2

Match for 11th place

Italy	Netherlands
4	3

Match for 9th place

Denmark	Norway
4	3

Flight C

Round 1

Portugal	Austria
5.5	1.5

Belgium	Iceland
7	0

Round 2

Portugal	Iceland
5	2

Belgium	Austria
7	0

Round 3

Iceland	Austria
4.5	2.5

Belgium	Portugal
4	3

Final standings

Place	Country
1st place, gold medalist(s)	England
2nd place, silver medalist(s)	Scotland
3rd place, bronze medalist(s)	Sweden
4	Spain
5	France
6	Switzerland
7	West Germany
8	Wales
9	Denmark
10	Norway
11	Italy
12	Netherlands
13	Ireland
14	Finland
15	Belgium
16	Portugal
17	Iceland
18	Austria

== See also ==
- Eisenhower Trophy – biennial world amateur team golf championship for men organized by the International Golf Federation.
- European Ladies' Team Championship – European amateur team golf championship for women organised by the European Golf Association.
