= Claës Jöhncke =

Swedish professional golfer

Personal information
- Full name: Claës Lennart Jöhncke
- Nationality: Sweden
- Born: 23 June 1941 (age 85) Stockholm, Sweden
- Spouse: Madeleine Nessim (deceased 2003)
- Children: 4

Career
- Sport: Golf
- Turned professional: 1992
- Former tour: Senior PGA Tour

Achievements and awards
- Swedish Golfer of the Year: 1967, 1969

Claës Lennart Jöhncke (born 23 June 1941) is a Swedish professional golfer who was one of the leading Swedish amateur golfers in the 1960s and early 1970s.

== Early life ==
Jöhncke was born in Stockholm, Sweden, as the oldest of two sons to Lennart Jöhncke (1916–1999) and Karin Stael von Holstein (1919–2010).

Jöhnckes father was Swedish champion in squash in 1939 and 1940. His uncle Torsten Jöhncke (1912–1984) won the Swedish squash championship the following two years, 1941 and 1942, as well as played in the Swedish national team in ice hockey in the 1930s and competed in the 1936 Winter Olympics.

At young age Jöhncke began as a caddie for his father at Lidingö Golf Club north of Stockholm. The family moved to Linköping in the Swedish province of Östergötland in 1953, were both Jöhncke and his brother Johan learned golf and both advanced to elite level in the country. Four years after coming to Linköping Golf Club, Jönhcke reached handicap scratch and quit ice hockey and other sports he had practiced in his youth.

Jöhncke's first important golf win came when he was 18 years old at the French International Boys Championship at Golf de Saint-Cloud, outside Paris, beating Malcolm Gregson, England, 4 and 2 in the final.

Jöhncke and his brother Johan came to represent Sweden together many times, first time at the 1962 European Youths' Team Championship in Germany, when they were part of the Swedish team finishing second.

== Amateur career ==
In the 1960s an early 1970s, Jöhncke won all three major Swedish amateur tournaments at the time, at least once.

In 1963, Jöhncke moved to Stockholm and represented Stockholm Golf Club 1963–1972.

He won the Swedish International Stroke Play Championship seven years in a row, but had to wait until 1972 before he won the Swedish Match-play Championship.

He also has six wins in the most important Swedish foursome tournament at the time, the Scandinavian Foursome over 72 holes stroke-play at Göteborg Golf Club.

He represented Sweden five times at the amateur worlds, the Eisenhower Trophy. At his first appearance, in 1962 in Itō, Shizuoka, Japan, at 21 years of age, he finished as best Swedish player. For the 1968 Eisenhower Trophy in Melbourne, Australia, during the peak in Jöhncke's amateur career, the Swedish Golf Federation decided to not send a team. However, Jöhncke in 1968 was appointed, for the third of six appearances, to the Continent of Europe team to meet Great Britain and Ireland for the St Andrews Trophy. The last time he was selected for the Continent of Europe team, 1974, it was against the nomination from the Swedish Golf Federation, but it ended in a victory for the Continent team for the first time in the history of the match.

In 1968, at the first visit in Sweden by Arnold Palmer, Jöhncke, recognized as the best amateur player in the country, was invited for an exhibition match over 18 holes at Falsterbo Golf Club with Palmer, Sven Tumba and the best Swedish club pro at the time, John Cockin, drawing approximately 5,000 spectators.

After a long and successful amateur career in Europe, Jöhncke moved to the United States in 1973 and Winged Foot Golf Club, New York, became his home club. He played a few amateur tournaments in Europe the following summer, but was not selected for the Swedish 1974 Eisenhower Trophy team.

== Professional career ==
He turned professional at age 50 in 1991, with the intention of playing on the Senior PGA Tour in the United States. He finished 77th in his debut in September at the 1991 Digital Seniors Classic, earning $500. He only played a few senior tournaments, but entered the 1994 Senior British Open and missed the cut by a shot after scoring 74-81.

== Awards and honors ==
In 1961, at 20 years of age, Jöhncke earned Elite Sign No. 40 by the Swedish Golf Federation, on the basis of national team appearances and national championship performances. He became the player with most appearances in the Swedish men's national amateur golf team, including discontinued events, like the yearly match between the national amateur team and a team representing the PGA of Sweden.

As an amateur, Jöhncke was twice, 1967 and 1969, awarded Swedish Golfer of the Year, male and female, professional and amateur. At the time, there was a rule stating that a player not could be awarded more than two times.

In June 1996, Jöhncke was ranked as 14th among the 50 best Swedish players ever, male or female, professional or amateur, by Svensk Golf, the official magazine of the Swedish Golf Federation, at the 50 years anniversary of the magazine.

== Private life ==
Jöhncke was married to Madeleine Nessim, deceased in 2003 at 58 years of age, whose sister, Mona, was married to famous Swedish sports man, ice hockey player and golf entrepreneur, Sven Tumba, with whom Jöhncke was team mate, representing Sweden, at the 1970 Eisenhower Trophy in Madrid, Spain.

Jöhncke moved to United States with his family in 1973, to work at the New York branch of the bank where he was employed in Sweden. Six years later he quit his bank job and started his own business, to later become a real estate developer and moved to North Palm Beach, Florida. He later resided in West Palm Beach.

Jöhncke and his wife had four children together, Anders, Christopher, Michelle and Peter. The youngest, Peter, became a professional golf trick artist, after first trying as a tournament professional on the European Challenge Tour.

== Amateur wins ==
- 1959 French International Boys Championship
- 1960 Scandinavian Foursome (with Christer Lindberg)
- 1961 Swedish Junior Match-play Championship
- 1963 Swedish International Stroke Play Championship, Scandinavian Foursome (with Rune Karlfeldt)
- 1964 Swedish International Stroke Play Championship
- 1965 Swedish International Stroke Play Championship, Scandinavian Foursome (with Rune Karlfeldt)
- 1966 Swedish International Stroke Play Championship, Scandinavian Foursome (with Rune Karlfeldt)
- 1967 Swedish International Stroke Play Championship, Scandinavian International Match-play Championship, Scandinavian Foursome (with Rune Karlfeldt)
- 1968 Swedish International Stroke Play Championship, Scandinavian Foursome (with Rune Karlfeldt)
- 1969 Swedish International Stroke Play Championship, Scandinavian International Match-play Championship
- 1972 Swedish Match-play Championship, Scandinavian International Match-play Championship

== Team appearances ==
Amateur

- European Youths' Team Championship (representing Sweden): 1962
- European Amateur Team Championship (representing Sweden): 1963, 1965, 1967, 1969, 1971
- Eisenhower Trophy (representing Sweden): 1962, 1964, 1966, 1970, 1972
- St Andrews Trophy (representing Continent of Europe): 1962, 1966, 1968, 1970, 1972, 1974 (winners)
