= Simon Cox (golfer) =

Welsh golfer and coach (born 1952)

Personal information
- Nationality: Wales
- Born: 20 March 1952 (age 74) Wenvoe, Wales
- Height: 5 ft 11 in (1.80 m)

Career
- Sport: Golf
- Turned professional: 1974
- Former tour: European Tour
- Professional wins: 2

Simon P. Cox (born 20 March 1952) is a Welsh professional golfer and coach.

== Amateur career ==
Cox won the Welsh Amateur Championship during his amateur career. He also represented Wales and Great Britain.

== Professional career ==
In 1975, he turned professional, playing on the PGA European Tour and competing in tournaments worldwide.

Among the highlights of a professional career that saw him compete across Australia, New Zealand, South America and Africa, he represented Wales in the 1975 Golf World Cup in Thailand. He also won the Welsh Professional Championship on two occasions.

== Professional wins ==
- 1976 Welsh Professional Championship
- 1983 Welsh Professional Championship

== Team appearances ==
Amateur

- European Amateur Team Championship (representing Wales): 1971, 1973

Professional

- World Cup (representing Wales): 1975
- Double Diamond International (representing Wales): 1977
