= 1969 European Amateur Team Championship =

Golf competition

Tournament information
- Dates: 26–29 June 1969
- Location: Hamburg, Germany; 53°34′29″N 9°45′55″E
- Course: Hamburger Golf Club – Falkenstein
- Organized by: European Golf Association
- Format: Qualification round: 18 holes stroke play Knock-out match-play

Statistics
- Par: 71
- Length: 6,655 yards (6,085 m)
- Field: 18 teams circa 108 players

Champion
- England; Peter Benka, Michael Bonallack, Bruce Critchley, Rodney Foster, Geoff Marks, Peter Tupling
- Qualification round: 368 (+13); Final: 4.5–2.5

Location map
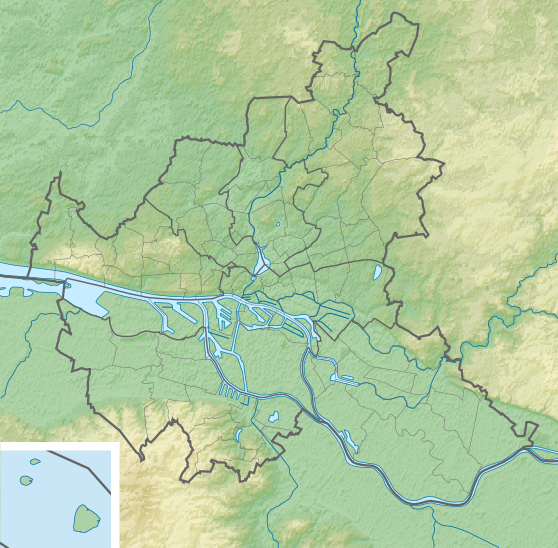
- Location in the Europe Location in Germany Location in Hamburg

The 1969 European Amateur Team Championship took place 26–29 June at Hamburger Golf Club – Falkenstein, outside Hamburg, Germany. It was the sixth men's golf European Amateur Team Championship.

== Venue ==
The hosting club Hamburger Golf Club was founded in 1906, one of the ten oldest clubs in Germany, and initially based in Flottbek. The championship course in Falkenstein, 20 kilometres west of central Hamburg, was designed by English golf architects Harry Colt, Charles Hugh Alison and John Stanton Fleming Morrison and completed in October 1930.

The club hosted the professional tournament German Open six times 1951–1965 and again in 1981 on the European Tour.

=== Course layout ===
Hole	Meters	Par	Hole	Meters	Par
1	305	4	10	180	3
2	520	5	11	410	4
3	220	3	12	380	4
4	440	5	13	355	4
5	375	4	14	330	4
6	390	4	15	160	3
7	335	4	16	330	4
8	170	3	17	440	5
9	395	4	18	350	4
Out	3,150	36	In	2,935	35
Source:		Total		6,085	71

== Format ==
All participating teams played one qualification round of stroke-play with up to six players, counted the five best scores for each team.

The eight best teams formed flight A, in knock-out match-play over the next three days. The teams were seeded based on their positions after the stroke play. Each of the four best placed teams were drawn to play the quarter-final against one of the teams in the flight placed in the next four positions. In each match between two nation teams, two 18-hole foursome games and five 18-hole single games were played. Teams were allowed to switch players during the team matches, selecting other players in to the afternoon single matches after the morning foursome matches.

The six teams placed 9–14 in the qualification stroke-play formed Flight B to play similar knock-out play and the four teams placed 15–18 formed Flight C to meet each other, to decide their final positions.

== Teams ==
18 nation teams contested the event. Each team consisted of five or six players.

Players in the teams

Country	Players
Austria	R. Hauser, H. Hild, Fritz Jonak, J. Kyrle, Alexander Maculan, Klaus Nierlich
Belgium	John Bigwood, Eddy Carbonnelle, C. Kreglinger, Jacky Moerman, Freddy Rodesch, Philippe Toussaint
Czechoslovakia	L. Bartunek, Jan Dvorak, Jaroslav Dvorak, Jiri Dvorak, Jan Kunsta, Jiri Kunsta
Denmark	John Jacobsen, Nils Elsøe Jensen, Klaus Friche, Klaus Hove, Henry Knudsen, Ole Wiberg-Jørgensen
England	Peter Benka, Michael Bonallack, Bruce Critchley, Rodney Foster, Geoff Marks, Peter Tupling
Finland	Asko Arkkola, Jalo Grönlund, O. Hanski, Juhani Hämäläinen, Harry Safonoff, Kari Salonen
France	Didier Charmat, Jean-Charles Desbordes, Hervé Frayssineau, Alexis Godillot, Roger Lagarde, Gaëtan Mourgue D'Algue
Ireland	Joe Carr, Tom Craddock, Tom Egan, Peter Flaherty, John O'Leary, Vincent Nevin
Italy	Franco Bevione, P. Cora, Baldovino Dassù, Alberto Schiaffino, Lorenzo Silva, Carlo Tadini
Netherlands	R.E. van Erven Dorens, M.A.J. Eykman, D. van Kalken, Jaap van Neck, Piet-Hein Streutgers, Victor Swane
Norway	Petter Dønnestad, Olaf Eie, Thomas Eriksen, Johan Horn, Westye Höegh, Per Heidenreich
Portugal	Rodrico M. Bivar, Antonio Carmona Santos, E.P. Coelho, T. Lagos, José Lara de Sousa e Melo, D.E. Santo Silva
Scotland	Andrew Brooks, Gordon Cosh, Charlie Green, Bill Murray, Sandy Pirie, Hugh Stuart
Spain	José Gancedo, Alvaro Muro, Álvaro Rezola, Francisco Sanchiz, Juan Sentmenat, Román Tayá,
Sweden	Ulf Bexelius, Hans Hedjerson, Claës Jöhncke, Johan Jöhncke, Magnus Lindberg, Jan Rosell
Switzerland	Peter Gütermann, Anton Matti, Uli Lamm, R. Moos, Jürg Pesko, Michel Rey
Wales	Jimmy Buckley, John Povall, Hew Squirell, David Stevens, Iestyn Tucker, Martin Walters
West Germany	Walter Brühne, Peter Jochums, Hans Lampert, Veit Pagel, Jürgen Weghmann, Nils Wirichs

== Winners ==
England won the gold medal, earning their second title, beating host country West Germany 4.5–2.5 in the final. Defending champions team Ireland earned the bronze on third place, after beating Italy 5.5–1.5 in the bronze match.

Individual leader in the opening 18-hole stroke-play qualifying competition was Gordon Cosh, Scotland, with a course record score of 3-under-par 68, one stroke ahead of Tom Craddock, Ireland. There was no official award for the lowest individual score.

== Results ==
Qualification round

Team standings

Place	Country	Score	To par
1	Scotland	367	+11
2	England	368	+13
3	Denmark	370	+15
T4	Wales *	371	+16
T4	Ireland	371	+16
6	Sweden	379	+24
T7	West Germany *	384	+29
T7	Italy	384	+29
T9	Spain *	386	+31
T9	Belgium	386	+31
11	Austria	388	+33
12	France	389	+34
13	Norway	390	+35
14	Finland	394	+39
15	Switzerland	397	+42
16	Netherlands	401	+46
17	Portugal	410	+55
18	Czechoslovakia	415	+60

* Note: In the event of a tie the order was determined by the better non-counting score.

Individual leaders

Place	Player	Country	Score	To par
1	Gordon Cosh	Scotland	68	−3
2	Tom Craddock	Ireland	70	−1
T3	John Jacobsen	Denmark	71	E
T3	Vincent Nevin	Ireland	71	E
T5	Michael Bonallack	England	72	+1
T5	Per Heidenrech	Norway	72	+1
T5	Iestyn Tucker	Wales	72	+1
T5	Martin Walters	Wales	72	+1
T9	Franco Bevione	Italy	73	+2
T9	Baldovino Dassù	Italy	73	+2
T9	Claës Jöhncke	Sweden	73	+2
T9	Johan Jöhncke	Sweden	73	+2
T9	Geoff Marks	England	73	+2
T9	Jacky Moerman	Belgium	73	+2
T9	Klaus Nielich	Austria	73	+2
T9	Hugh Stuart	Scotland	73	+2

Note: There was no official award for the lowest individual score.

Flight A

Bracket

Quarter finals
England	4
Sweden	3
Italy	5
Wales	2
West Germany	4.5
Denmark	2.5
Ireland	4
Scotland	3

Semi finals
England	4.5
Italy	2.5
West Germany	4.5
Ireland	2.5

Final
England	4.5
West Germany	2.5
Bronze match
Ireland	5.5
Italy	1.5

Elimination matches
Sweden	5
Wales	2
Scotland	6
Denmark	1

Match for 5th place
Scotland	5.5
Sweden	1.5
Match for 7th place
Wales	4
Denmark	3

Final games

England	West Germany
4.5	2.5
M. Bonallack / R. Foster	W. Brühne / H. Lampert 2 & 1
P. Benka / G. Marks 4 & 3	P. Jochums / J. Weghmann
Michael Bonallack 6 & 5	H. Lampert
Geoff Marks	Peter Jochums 1 hole
Peter Benka 3 & 1	Walter Brühne
Bruce Critchley 5 & 3	Veit Pagel
Rodney Foster AS *	Jürgen Weghmann AS *

* Note: Game declared halved, since team match already decided.

Flight B

Bracket

Round 1
France	6
Finland	1
Norway	4
Austria	3

Round 2
France	4
Belgium	3
Norway	4.5
Spain	2.5

Match for 9th place
France	4.5
Norway	2.5
Match for 11th place
Belgium	5
Spain	2

Round 1

Match for 13th place
Finland	4.5
Austria	2.5

Flight C

Round 1

Netherlands	Czechoslovakia
5	2

Switzerland	Portugal
5	2

Round 2

Switzerland	Czechoslovakia
4	3

Netherlands	Portugal
5	2

Round 3

Portugal	Czechoslovakia
4	3

Switzerland	Netherlands
5	2

Final standings

Place	Country
1st place, gold medalist(s)	England
2nd place, silver medalist(s)	West Germany
3rd place, bronze medalist(s)	Ireland
4	Italy
5	Scotland
6	Sweden
7	Wales
8	Denmark
9	France
10	Norway
11	Belgium
12	Spain
13	Finland
14	Austria
15	Switzerland
16	Netherlands
17	Portugal
18	Czechoslovakia

== See also ==
- Eisenhower Trophy – biennial world amateur team golf championship for men organized by the International Golf Federation.
- European Ladies' Team Championship – European amateur team golf championship for women organised by the European Golf Association.
