= 1967 European Amateur Team Championship =

Golf competition

Tournament information
- Dates: 22–25 June 1967
- Location: Turin, Italy; 45°12′10″N 07°33′00″E
- Course: Circolo Golf Torino – La Mandria
- Organized by: European Golf Association
- Format: Qualification round: 18 holes stroke play Knock-out match-play

Statistics
- Par: 72
- Field: 16 teams circa 96 players

Champion
- Ireland; Joe Carr, Tom Craddock, Tom Egan, Peter Flaherty, Vincent Nevin, David Sheahan
- Qualification round: 366 (+6); Final: 4–3

Location map
- Location in Europe Location in the Italy Location in Piedmont

The 1967 European Amateur Team Championship took place 22–25 June at Circolo Golf Torino – La Mandria, 18 kilometres north of central Turin, Italy. It was the fifth men's golf European Amateur Team Championship.

== Format ==
All participating teams played one qualification round of stroke-play with up to six players, counted the five best scores for each team.

The eight best teams formed flight A, in knock-out match-play over the next three days. The teams were seeded based on their position after the stroke play. Each of the four best placed teams were drawn to play the quarter-final against one of the teams in the flight placed in the next four positions. In each match between two nation teams, two 18-hole foursome games and five 18-hole single games were played. Teams were allowed to switch players during the team matches, selecting other players in to the afternoon single games after the morning foursome games.

The eight teams placed 9–16 in the qualification stroke-play formed Flight, B to play a similar knock-out play to decide their final positions.

== Teams ==
16 nation teams contested the event. Each team consisted of a minimum of five players.

Players in the leading teams

| Country | Players |
|---|---|
| Belgium | John Bigwood, Eddy Carbonnelle, Jacky Moerman, Freddy Rodesch, Paul Rolin, Phiilippe Washer |
| England | Michael Attenborough, Michael Burgess, Bob Durrant, Rodney Foster, Geoff Marks, Dudley Millensted |
| France | Patrick Cros, Jean-Charles Desbordes, Hervé Frayssineau, Alexis Godillot, Roger Lagarde, Gaëtan Mourgue D'Algue |
| Ireland | Joe Carr, Tom Craddock, Tom Egan, Peter Flaherty, Vincent Nevin, David Sheahan |
| Italy | Franco Bevione, Carlo Bordogna, Stefano Cimatti, Angelo Croce, Alberto Schiaffino, Lorenzo Silva |
| Scotland | Findlay Black, Charlie Green, Sandy Pirie, Sandy Saddler, Ronnie Shade, Colin Strachan |
| Spain | Gonzalo Arana, Duke of Fernán-Núñez, Santiago Fernández, José Gancedo, Marqués de las Nieves, Roman Taya |
| Sweden | Per-Olof Johansson, Hans Hedjerson, Claes Jöhncke, Johan Jöhncke, Magnus Lindberg, Jonas Peil |
| Wales | Jimmy Buckley, Edward Davies, Paul Dunn, John Povall, Hew Squirell, Iestyn Tucker |
| West Germany | Walter Brühne, Gerhard König, Jan Müller, Helge Rademacher, Christian Strenger, Jürgen Weghmann |

Other participating teams

Country
Austria
Denmark
Finland
Norway
Netherlands
Switzerland
West Germany

== Winners ==
Defending champions team Ireland won the gold medal, beating team France 4–3 in the final. England earned the bronze on third place, after beating Scotland 4.5–2.5 in the bronze match.

Individual leaders in the opening 18-hole stroke-play qualifying competition was Tom Craddock, Ireland, and Charlie Green, Scotland, tied on first place, each with a score of 3-under-par 69. There was no official award for the lowest individual scores.

== Results ==
Qualification round

Team standings

| Place | Country | Score | To par |
|---|---|---|---|
| 1 | Ireland | 366 | +6 |
| 2 | Scotland | 371 | +11 |
| T3 | England * | 373 | +13 |
| T3 | France | 373 | +13 |
| 5 | Sweden | 376 | +16 |
| 6 | Spain | 384 | +24 |
| 7 | Belgium | 385 | +25 |
| 8 | Italy | 386 | +26 |
| 9 | West Germany | 390 | +30 |
| 10 | Wales | 392 | +32 |
| 11 | Netherlands | 396 | +36 |
| 12 | Denmark | 397 | +37 |
| 13 | Switzerland | 399 | +39 |
| 14 | Austria | 403 | +43 |
| 15 | Norway | 404 | +44 |
| 16 | Finland | 407 | +47 |

* Note: In the event of a tie the order was determined by the better non-counting score.

Individual leaders

| Place | Player | Country | Score | To par |
|---|---|---|---|---|
| T1 | Tom Craddock | Ireland | 69 | −3 |
| T1 | Charlie Green | Scotland | 69 | −3 |
| T3 | Roger Lagarde | France | 70 | −2 |
| T3 | Geoff Marks | England | 70 | −2 |
| 5 | Ronnie Shade | Scotland | 71 | −1 |
| T6 | Joe Carr | Ireland | 72 | E |
| T6 | Magnus Lindberg | Sweden | 72 | E |
| T6 | David Sheahan | Ireland | 72 | E |
| T9 | Franco Bevione | Italy | 73 | +1 |
| T9 | Rodney Foster | England | 73 | +1 |
| T9 | Alexis Godillot | France | 73 | +1 |
| T9 | Marqués de las Nieves | Spain | 73 | +1 |
| T9 | Phiilippe Washer | Belgium | 73 | +1 |

Note: There was no official award for the lowest individual score.

Flight A

Bracket

Quarter finals
Ireland | 5
Sweden | 2
England | 4.5
Belgium | 2.5
Scotland | 5.5
Spain | 1.5
France | 5
Italy | 2

Semi finals
Ireland | 5
England | 2
France | 4
Scotland | 3

Final
Ireland | 4
France | 3
Bronze match
England | 4.5
Scotland | 2.5

Elimination matches
Sweden | 5
Belgium | 2
Italy | 6
Spain | 1

Match for 5th place
Italy | 4
Sweden | 3
Match for 7th place
Belgium | 4
Spain | 3

Final games

| Ireland | France |
| 4 | 3 |
| J. Carr / T. Craddock 5 & 3 | P. Cros / G. Morgue d'Algue |
| T. Egan / P. Flaherty | A. Godillot / R. Lagarde 5 & 3 |
| Joe Carr | Patrick Cros 1 hole |
| Tom Craddock | Alexis Godillot 2 & 1 |
| David Sheahan 4 & 3 | Gaetan Morgue d'Algue |
| Peter Flaharty 5 & 4 | Jean-Charles Desbordes |
| Tom Egan 1 hole | Roger Lagarde |

Flight B

Bracket

Round 1
Wales | 5.5
Austria | 1.5
Denmark | 4.5
Finland | 2.5
Norway | 4
Netherlands | 3
West Germany | 6
Switzerland | 1

Round 2
Wales | 4
Denmark | 3
West Germany | 7
Norway | 0

Match for 9th place
Wales | 4
West Germany | 3
Match for 11th place
Denmark | 4
Norway | 3

Elimination matches
Austria | 5
Finland | 2
Netherlands | 4
Switzerland | 3

Match for 13th place
Austria | 4
Netherlands | 3
Match for 15th place
Switzerland | 5.5
Finland | 1.5

Final standings

| Place | Country |
|---|---|
| 1st place, gold medalist(s) | Ireland |
| 2nd place, silver medalist(s) | France |
| 3rd place, bronze medalist(s) | England |
| 4 | Scotland |
| 5 | Italy |
| 6 | Sweden |
| 7 | Belgium |
| 8 | Spain |
| 9 | Wales |
| 10 | West Germany |
| 11 | Denmark |
| 12 | Norway |
| 13 | Austria |
| 14 | Netherlands |
| 15 | Switzerland |
| 16 | Finland |

== See also ==
- Eisenhower Trophy – biennial world amateur team golf championship for men organized by the International Golf Federation.
- European Ladies' Team Championship – European amateur team golf championship for women organised by the European Golf Association.
