= Joe Carr (golfer) =

Irish golfer

Personal information
- Full name: Joseph Benedict Carr
- Nationality: Ireland
- Born: 22 February 1922 Inchicore, Ireland
- Died: 3 June 2004 (aged 82) Dublin, Ireland

Career
- Sport: Golf
- Status: Amateur

Best results in major championships
- Masters Tournament: 52nd: 1968
- PGA Championship: DNP
- U.S. Open: CUT: 1967
- The Open Championship: 8th: 1960
- U.S. Amateur: T3: 1961
- British Amateur: Won: 1953, 1958, 1960

Achievements and awards
- World Golf Hall of Fame: 2007 (member page)
- Bob Jones Award: 1961

Joseph Benedict Carr (22 February 1922 – 3 June 2004) was an Irish amateur golfer.

== Early life ==
Carr was born in Inchicore, a suburb of Dublin, Ireland, to George and Margaret Mary "Missie" Waters (the fifth of seven children). At 10 days old, he was adopted by his maternal aunt, Kathleen, and her husband, James Carr, who were childless and had recently returned home from India. The Carrs had just been appointed steward and stewardess of the Portmarnock Golf Club, allowing young Joe to play golf from a very early age.

== Golf career ==
Carr won his first major tournament, the East of Ireland Amateur, at the age of 19 in 1941, which started one of Ireland's greatest golfing careers. He went on to win twelve East of Ireland titles, twelve West of Ireland titles, six Irish Amateur Close Championships, four Irish Amateur Opens, and three South of Ireland titles.

Carr won The Amateur Championship three times, in 1953, 1958, and 1960, and was runner-up in 1968. He was a semi-finalist at the U.S. Amateur in 1961, and was low amateur at The Open Championship in both 1956 and 1958 (and finished 8th overall in 1960).

In 1967, he became the first Irishman to play in the Masters Tournament. He made three Masters appearances, surviving the cut in 1967 and 1968. He later became the first Irishman to be a member of the Augusta National Golf Club.

Carr received the Bob Jones Award in 1961, the USGA's highest honour, which is given for "distinguished sportsmanship in golf". He was the first non-American to win the award.

Internationally, Carr represented Ireland in numerous amateur golfing events. He was a member of a record eleven Walker Cup teams from 1947 to 1967, including non-playing captain in 1965 and playing captain in 1967, amassing a record of 5–14–1. After several years of playing against the United States' top-ranked players, he was moved down in the order for the 1961 event—only to be paired against Jack Nicklaus (who won the match).

Carr was part of the first winning Irish team at the European Amateur Team Championship in 1965 and again when Ireland successfully defended the title in 1967. After a third and last appearance by Carr in 1969, his son Roddy was a member of the Irish team in 1971, as well as on the winning Great Britain & Ireland Walker Cup team. In 1983 Carr's younger son John was part of the Irish team winning a third title at the European Amateur Team Championship.

Carr played and captained on multiple Eisenhower Trophy teams, and represented Ireland in the Men's Home Internationals every year from 1947 to 1969. Carr retired from competitive golf in 1971. In 1991, Carr was named Captain of The Royal and Ancient Golf Club of St Andrews, the first Irishman to hold the post. In July 2007, Carr was elected to the World Golf Hall of Fame in the Lifetime Achievement category, and was inducted in November 2007.

From 1992 until his death in 2004, Carr was president of Mount Juliet Golf Club in Kilkenny. Mount Juliet still hosts the annual J.B. Carr Trophy for its members. Two months before Carr's death, his son John became the third Irishman to be invited to join Augusta National Golf Club, after his father and Ian Webb.

== Awards and honors ==
- In 1961, Carr received the Bob Jones Award from the USGA
- In 2007, Carr was elected to the World Golf Hall of Fame

== Amateur wins (42) ==
- 1941 East of Ireland Amateur
- 1943 East of Ireland Amateur
- 1945 East of Ireland Amateur
- 1946 Irish Amateur Open Championship, West of Ireland Amateur, East of Ireland Amateur
- 1947 West of Ireland Amateur
- 1948 West of Ireland Amateur, East of Ireland Amateur, South of Ireland Amateur
- 1950 Irish Amateur Open Championship
- 1951 West of Ireland Amateur, Golf Illustrated Gold Vase
- 1953 British Amateur, West of Ireland Amateur
- 1954 Irish Amateur Open Championship, Irish Amateur Close, West of Ireland Amateur
- 1955 Gleneagles-Saxone Foursomes Tournament (with Harry Brashaw)
- 1956 Irish Amateur Open Championship, West of Ireland Amateur, East of Ireland Amateur
- 1957 Irish Amateur Close, East of Ireland Amateur
- 1958 British Amateur, West of Ireland Amateur, East of Ireland Amateur
- 1959 Berkshire Trophy
- 1960 British Amateur, West of Ireland Amateur, East of Ireland Amateur
- 1961 West of Ireland Amateur, East of Ireland Amateur
- 1962 West of Ireland Amateur
- 1963 Irish Amateur Close
- 1964 Irish Amateur Close, East of Ireland Amateur
- 1965 Irish Amateur Close
- 1966 West of Ireland Amateur, South of Ireland Amateur
- 1967 Irish Amateur Close
- 1969 East of Ireland Amateur, South of Ireland Amateur

== Major championships ==
=== Amateur wins (3) ===
Year	Championship	Winning score	Runner-up
1953	The Amateur Championship	2 up	(United States) Harvie Ward
1958	The Amateur Championship	3 & 2	(England) Alan Thirlwell
1960	The Amateur Championship	8 & 7	(United States) Bob Cochran

=== Results timeline ===
Tournament	1948	1949
Masters Tournament		
U.S. Open		
The Open Championship		
U.S. Amateur		R64
The Amateur Championship	R64	R64

Tournament	1950	1951	1952	1953	1954	1955	1956	1957	1958	1959
Masters Tournament										
U.S. Open										
The Open Championship		T24				CUT	T36 LA	CUT	37 LA	T38
U.S. Amateur				R128				R256		
The Amateur Championship	QF	SF	SF	1	SF	QF	R128	R128	1	R16

Tournament	1960	1961	1962	1963	1964	1965	1966	1967	1968	1969
Masters Tournament								55	52	CUT
U.S. Open								CUT		
The Open Championship	8	CUT	CUT	CUT	CUT	T33		CUT		
U.S. Amateur		SF				T38				
The Amateur Championship	1	QF	R32	R16	QF	R32	R128	R32	2	R64

Tournament	1970	1971	1972	1973
Masters Tournament				
U.S. Open				
The Open Championship		CUT		
U.S. Amateur				
The Amateur Championship	R256	R16	R32	R128

Win
Top 10
Did not play

LA = low amateur
CUT = Missed the half-way cut
"T" indicates a tie for a place
R256, R128, R64, R32, R16, QF, SF = Round in which player lost in match play

Sources: Masters, U.S. Open and U.S. Amateur, Open Championship, 1948 British Amateur, 1949 British Amateur, 1950 British Amateur, 1951 British Amateur, 1952 British Amateur, 1954 British Amateur, 1955 British Amateur, 1956 British Amateur, 1957 British Amateur, 1959 British Amateur

== Team appearances ==
- Walker Cup (representing Great Britain & Ireland): 1947, 1949, 1951, 1953, 1955, 1957, 1959, 1961, 1963, 1965 (tied, playing captain), 1967 (playing captain)
- Eisenhower Trophy (representing Great Britain & Ireland): 1958, 1960
- European Amateur Team Championship (representing Ireland): 1965, (winners) 1967 (winners), 1969
- Amateurs–Professionals Match (representing the Amateurs): 1956, 1957, 1958 (winners), 1959, 1960
- St Andrews Trophy (representing Great Britain & Ireland): 1956 (winners), 1968 (winners)
