= Ian Hutcheon =

Scottish golfer

Personal information
- Full name: Ian Colin Hutcheon
- Nationality: Scotland
- Born: February 1942 (age 84) Monifieth, Scotland

Career
- Sport: Golf
- Status: Amateur

Ian Colin Hutcheon (born February 1942) is a Scottish amateur golfer. He was one of the leading British amateurs of the 1970s. As an individual, he won the Scottish Amateur in 1973 and was Scottish Amateur Stroke Play Champion three times. He represented Great Britain and Ireland in four Walker Cup matches and three times in the Eisenhower Trophy.

Hutcheon is most remembered for his part in winning the 1976 Eisenhower Trophy at Penina Golf Club in Portugal, where he was also the joint lowest scorer over the four rounds, tied with Chen Tze-ming from Chinese Taipei. Great Britain and Ireland led by two strokes after three rounds over Australia, Japan and the United States. On the final day Hutcheon scored 71 while the other three members of the team scored 76, 77 and 78. The team score of 224, the best three scores, was the lowest of the day, matched by Japan, and gave the team a two shot win. Hutcheon's 71 was the lowest of the day and his back-9 of 34 was the lowest of the week.

Hutcheon has been a member of Monifieth Golf Club for over 60 years. He was a scratch golfer into his 80s.

== Amateur wins ==
- 1971 Scottish Amateur Stroke Play Championship
- 1973 Scottish Amateur
- 1974 Scottish Amateur Stroke Play Championship
- 1979 Scottish Amateur Stroke Play Championship
- 1980 Lytham Trophy

== Team appearances ==
- European Amateur Team Championship (representing Scotland): 1973, 1975 (winners, individual leader), 1977 (winners), 1979, 1981
- Walker Cup (representing Great Britain & Ireland): 1975, 1977, 1979, 1981
- Eisenhower Trophy (representing Great Britain & Ireland): 1974, 1976 (team winners, joint individual leader), 1980
- St Andrews Trophy (representing Great Britain & Ireland): 1974, 1976 (winners)
- Commonwealth Tournament (representing Great Britain): 1975
