= John Hawksworth (golfer) =

English golfer (born 1961)

Personal information
- Full name: John Frederick Hawksworth
- Nationality: England
- Born: 27 March 1961 (age 65) Sutton Coldfield, England
- Height: 6 ft 3 in (1.91 m)
- Children: William (b. 1994)

Career
- Sport: Golf
- Turned professional: 1985
- Former tour: European Tour

Best results in major championships
- Masters Tournament: DNP
- PGA Championship: DNP
- U.S. Open: DNP
- The Open Championship: T94: 1995

John Frederick Hawksworth (born 27 March 1961) is an English professional golfer. He played on the European Tour from 1986 to 2000.

== Career ==
Hawksworth had a successful amateur career. In 1984, he won which he won the Lytham Trophy in 1984. He was a member of the Great Britain and Ireland team in the 1985 Walker Cup alongside Colin Montgomerie and David Gilford.

In 1985, Hawksworth turned professional. He did not go on to enjoy the same success as a professional as his former teammates, revisiting the European Tour's qualifying school on many occasions where he only twice managed to regain full playing rights.

Since retiring from tournament golf in 2000, Hawksworth has been a regular commentator on UK television, appearing for both the BBC and Sky Sports, and on the radio with Talksport.

== Amateur wins ==
- 1983 Berkhamsted Trophy
- 1984 Lytham Trophy, Hampshire Hog

== Professional wins (1) ==
- 1987 Peugeot Talbot PGA Assistants' Championship

== Results in major championships ==
Tournament	1984	1985	1986	1987	1988	1989	1990	1991	1992	1993	1994	1995
The Open Championship	CUT							CUT				T94

Note: Hawksworth only played in The Open Championship.

Did not play

CUT = missed the half-way cut
"T" = tied

== Team appearances ==
- European Amateur Team Championship (representing England): 1985
- Walker Cup (representing Great Britain & Ireland): 1985
- St Andrews Trophy (representing Great Britain & Ireland): 1984 (winners)
