= 1965 European Amateur Team Championship =

Golf competition

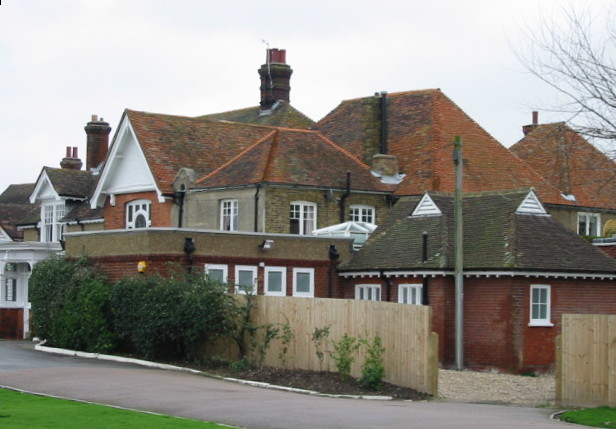
- Royal St George's Golf Club clubhouse

Tournament information
- Dates: 23–27 June 1965
- Location: Sandwich, Kent, England; 51.274°N 1.367°E
- Course: Royal St George's Golf Club
- Organized by: European Golf Association
- Format: 36 holes stroke play round-robin system match play

Statistics
- Par: 70
- Length: 6,742 yards (6,165 m)
- Field: 17 teams circa 120 players

Champion
- Ireland; Joe Carr, Tom Craddock, Michael Craigan, Bill McCrea, Vincent Nevin, David Sheahan, Rupert Staunton
- Qualification round: 599 (+39); Flight A matches: 4 points

Location map
- Location in Europe Location in the British Isles Location in England Location in Sandwich, Kent

The 1965 European Amateur Team Championship took place 23–27 June at Royal St George's Golf Club in Sandwich, Kent, England and at nearby Royal Cinque Ports in Deal. It was the fourth men's golf European Amateur Team Championship.

== Venue ==
Royal St George's Golf Club was founded in 1887 and had previously hosted The Open Championship nine times, but not since 1949. It came back to the Open Championship rotation in 1981. For the 1965 European Amateur Team Championship, the course was set up with par 70 over 6,742 yards and was played in windy whether conditions. The teams in flights A, B and C played their matches at Royal St George's, while the teams in flights D and E played their matches at Royal Cinque Ports.

=== Course layout ===
Royal St George's Golf Club

| Hole | Meters | Par | Hole | Meters | Par |
|---|---|---|---|---|---|
| 1 | 403 | 4 | 10 | 347 | 4 |
| 2 | 338 | 4 | 11 | 351 | 4 |
| 3 | 218 | 3 | 12 | 310 | 4 |
| 4 | 421 | 4 | 13 | 405 | 4 |
| 5 | 412 | 4 | 14 | 475 | 5 |
| 6 | 151 | 3 | 15 | 415 | 4 |
| 7 | 451 | 5 | 16 | 149 | 4 |
| 8 | 167 | 3 | 17 | 387 | 3 |
| 9 | 362 | 4 | 18 | 403 | 4 |
| Out | 2,923 | 34 | In | 3,242 | 36 |
| Source: | | Total | | 6,165 | 70 |

== Format ==
All participating teams played two qualification rounds of stroke-play, counting the four best scores out of up to six players for each team. The four best teams formed flight A, the next four teams formed flight B, the next three teams formed flight C, the next three teams formed flight D and the last three teams formed flight E.

The standings in each flight was determined by a round-robin system. All teams in the flight met each other and the team with most points for team matches in flight A won the tournament, using the scale, win=2 points, halved=1 point, lose=0 points. In each match between two nation teams, three foursome games and six single games were played. Teams were allowed to switch players during the team matches and select other players in to the afternoon single games after the morning foursome games.

== Teams ==
17 nation teams contested the event. Each team consisted of a minimum of six players.

Players in the leading teams

| Country | Players |
|---|---|
| Belgium | John Bigwood, Jacky Moerman, Freddy Rodesch, Paul Rolin, Phiilippe Washer |
| Denmark | Steen Andersen, Niels Elsøe Jensen, Klaus Friche, John Jacobsen, Peter Palsby, Ole Pfeiffer, Niels Thygesen, Ole Wiberg-Jørgensen |
| England | Michael Bonallack (playing captain), Martin Christmas, Clive Clark, Gordon Clark, Rodney Foster, Michael Lunt, Peter Townsend |
| France | Didier Charmat, Patrick Cros, Hervé Frayssineau, Alexis Godillot, Roger Lagarde, Gaëtan Mourgue D'Algue |
| Ireland | Joe Carr, Tom Craddock, Michael Craigan, Bill McCrea, Vincent Nevin, David Sheahan, Rupert Staunton |
| Italy | E. Bergamo, Carlo Bordogna, Stefano Cimatti, P. Cora, Angelo Croce, Lorenzo Silva |
| Norway | Jan Aaseth, Per Heidenreich, John Johansen, Arve Pedersen |
| Scotland | Findlay Black, Hugh Campbell, Gordon Cosh, Charlie Green, Alistair Low, Sandy Saddler, Ronnie Shade |
| Spain | Iván Maura, Duke of Fernán-Núñez, Santiago Fernández, Javier Viladomiu |
| Sweden | Johny Anderson, Gustaf Adolf Bielke, Per-Olof Johansson, Claes Jöhncke, Rune Karlfeldt, Göran Lindeblad, Bengt Möller, Nils Odqvist (playing captain) |
| Wales | Edward Davies, Charles Gilford, John Llewellyn Morgan, John Povall, Hew Squirell, Jeff Toye, Iestyn Tucker |
| West Germany | Walter Brühne, Dietrich von Knoop, Hans Lampert, Peter Möller, Helge Rademacher, Erik Sellschopp, Nils Wirichs |

Other participating teams

Country
Austria
Finland
Netherlands
Switzerland
Portugal

== Winners ==
Team Ireland, making its first appearance in the championship, won the gold medal, earning 4 points in flight A. Scotland took the silver medal, also on 4 team match points, but with lesser won game points. Defending champion and host country England earned the bronze on third place.

Individual leader in the first round of the opening 36-hole stroke-play qualifying competition was Michael Bonallack, England, with a score of 1-under-par 69. Iestyn Tucker, Wales, shot the only under par score in the second round, also scoring 69. The total individual honor belonged to Michael Bonallack, with a 7-over-par score of 147 over 36 holes, but there was no official award for the lowest individual score.

== Results ==
Qualification rounds

Team standings

| Place | Country | Score | To par |
|---|---|---|---|
| 1 | England | 300-297=597 | +37 |
| 2 | Ireland | 300-299=599 | +39 |
| 3 | Scotland | 299-304=603 | +43 |
| 4 | Wales | 307-302=609 | +49 |
| 5 | France | 311-309=620 | +60 |
| T6 | Sweden* | 317-314=631 | +71 |
| T6 | West Germany | 313-318=631 | +71 |
| 8 | Denmark | 319-318=637 | +77 |
| 9 | Italy | 324-314=638 | +78 |
| 10 | Spain | 329-314=643 | +83 |
| 11 | Belgium | 317-334=651 | +91 |
| T12 | Switzerland* | 347-326=673 | +113 |
| T12 | Finland | 341-332=673 | +113 |
| 14 | Norway | 327-348=675 | +115 |
| 15 | Portugal | 340-339=679 | +119 |
| 16 | Netherlands | 340-341=681 | +121 |
| 17 | Austria | 343-355=698 | +138 |

* Note: In the event of a tie the order was determined by the better non-counting score.

Individual leaders

| Place | Player | Country | Score | To par |
|---|---|---|---|---|
| 1 | Michael Bonallack | England | 69-78=147 | +7 |
| T2 | Joe Carr | Ireland | 71-78=149 | +9 |
| T2 | Vincent Nevin | Ireland | 76-73=149 | +9 |
| T2 | John Povall | Wales | 75-74=149 | +9 |
| T5 | Tom Craddock | Ireland | 76-74=150 | +10 |
| T5 | Sandy Saddler | Scotland | 78-72=150 | +10 |
| T5 | Iestyn Tucker | Wales | 81-69=150 | +10 |
| T8 | Clive Clark | England | 78-73=151 | +11 |
| T8 | Gordon Cosh | Scotland | 72-79=15 | +11 |
| T10 | Angelo Croce | Italy | 79-73=152 | +12 |
| T10 | Rodney Foster | England | 76-76=152 | +12 |
| T10 | Erik Sellschopp | West Germany | 78-74=152 | +12 |
| T10 | Ronnie Shade | Scotland | 72-80=152 | +12 |

Note: There was no official award for the lowest individual score.

Flight A

Team matches

| 2 | England | Wales | 0 |
| 6.5 | | 2.5 | |

| 2 | Ireland | Scotland | 0 |
| 7 | | 2 | |

| 2 | Scotland | England | 0 |
| 6.5 | | 2.5 | |

| 2 | Ireland | Wales | 0 |
| 7 | | 2 | |

| 2 | England | Ireland | 0 |
| 6 | | 3 | |

| 2 | Scotland | Wales | 0 |
| 7 | | 2 | |

Team standings

| Country | Place | W | T | L | Game points | Points |
|---|---|---|---|---|---|---|
| Ireland | 1 | 2 | 0 | 1 | 17–10 | 4 |
| Scotland | 2 | 2 | 0 | 1 | 15.5–11.5 | 4 |
| England | 3 | 2 | 0 | 1 | 15–12 | 4 |
| Wales | 4 | 0 | 0 | 3 | 6.5–20.5 | 0 |

Flight B

Team matches

| 2 | West Germany | Sweden | 0 |
| 5 | | 4 | |

| 2 | France | Denmark | 0 |
| 6.5 | | 2.5 | |

| 2 | Sweden | Denmark | 0 |
| 5.5 | | 3.5 | |

| 2 | France | West Germany | 0 |
| 6 | | 3 | |

| 1 | France | Sweden | 1 |
| 4.5 | | 4-5 | |

| 1 | Denmark | West Germany | 1 |
| 4.5 | | 4.5 | |

Team standings

| Country | Place | W | T | L | Game points | Points |
|---|---|---|---|---|---|---|
| France | 5 | 2 | 1 | 0 | 17–10 | 5 |
| Sweden | 6 | 1 | 1 | 1 | 14–13 | 3 |
| West Germany | 7 | 1 | 1 | 1 | 12.5–14.5 | 3 |
| Denmark | 8 | 0 | 1 | 2 | 10.5–16.5 | 1 |

Flight C

Team standings

| Country | Place | Points |
|---|---|---|
| Spain | 9 | 3 |
| Belgium | 10 | 2 |
| Italy | 11 | 1 |

Flight D

Team standings

| Country | Place | Points |
|---|---|---|
| Norway | 12 | 4 |
| Switzerland | 13 | 2 |
| Finland | 14 | 0 |

Flight E

Team standings

| Country | Place | Points |
|---|---|---|
| Netherlands | 15 | 3 |
| Portugal | 16 | 3 |
| Austria | 17 | 0 |

Final standings

| Place | Country |
|---|---|
| 1st place, gold medalist(s) | Ireland |
| 2nd place, silver medalist(s) | Scotland |
| 3rd place, bronze medalist(s) | England |
| 4 | Wales |
| 5 | France |
| 6 | Sweden |
| 7 | West Germany |
| 8 | Denmark |
| 9 | Spain |
| 10 | Belgium |
| 11 | Italy |
| 12 | Norway |
| 13 | Switzerland |
| 14 | Finland |
| 15 | Netherlands |
| 16 | Portugal |
| 17 | Austria |

== See also ==
- Eisenhower Trophy – biennial world amateur team golf championship for men organized by the International Golf Federation.
- European Ladies' Team Championship – European amateur team golf championship for women organised by the European Golf Association.
