= 1963 European Amateur Team Championship =

Golf competition

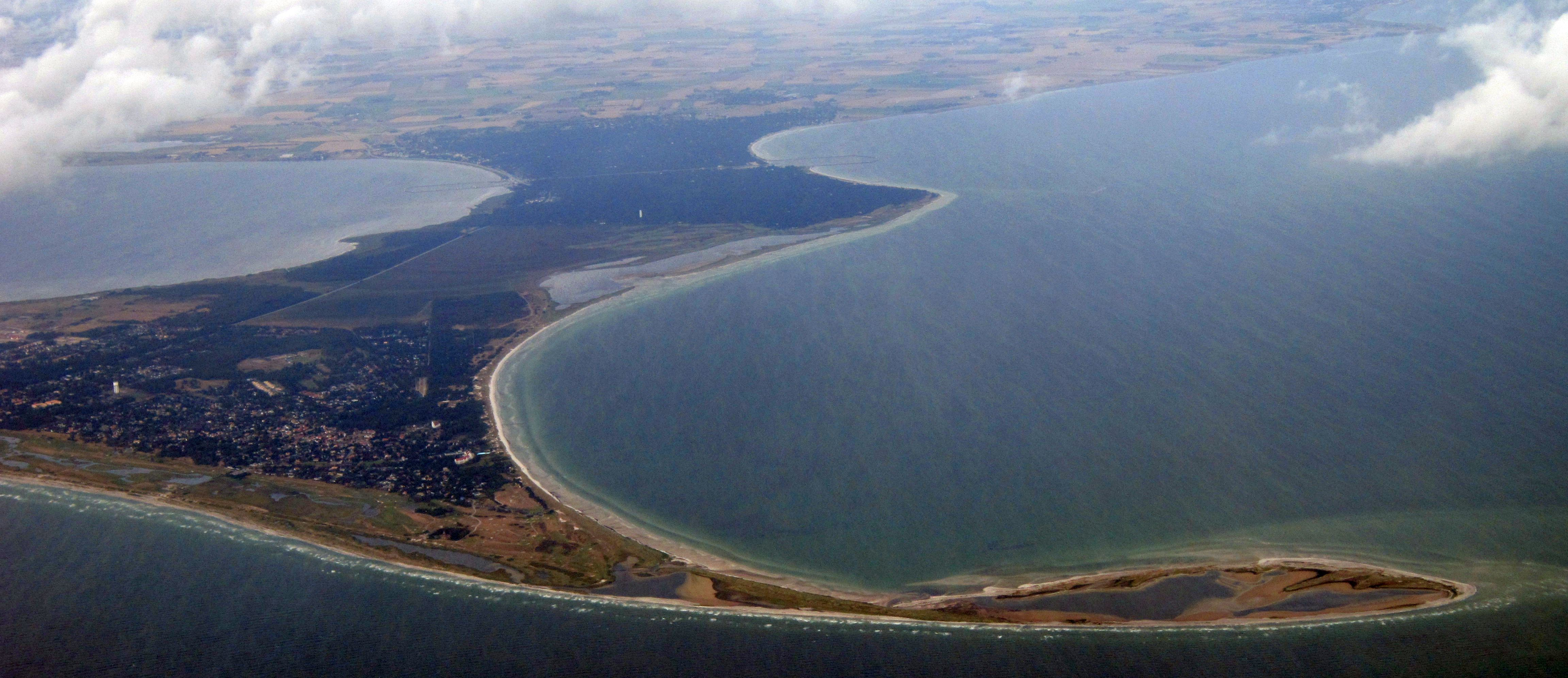
- Aerial view of course at Falsterbo Golf Club

Tournament information
- Dates: 3–7 July 1963
- Location: Falsterbo, Sweden; 55°23′N 12°50′E
- Course: Falsterbo Golf Club
- Organized by: European Golf Association
- Format: 36 holes stroke play round-robin system match play

Statistics
- Par: 71
- Length: 6,400 yards (5,900 m)
- Field: 14 teams circa 100 players

Champion
- England; Michael Bonallack, Michael Burgess, Rodney Foster, Peter Green, David Moffat, David Palmer, Alan Thirlwell
- Qualification round: 580 (+12); Flight A matches: 6 points
- Location in Europe Location in Sweden Location in Scania

The 1963 European Amateur Team Championship took place 3–7 July at Falsterbo Golf Club in Falsterbo, Sweden. It was the third men's golf European Amateur Team Championship.

== Venue ==
The hosting club, Sweden's third oldest golf club, was founded in 1909. Its links course, located on a headland peninsula at the south west tip of Sweden, was opened in 1934, initially designed by Robert Turnbull and later redesigned by Gunnar Bauer, Peter Nordwall and Peter Chamberlain.

The course later came to host the 1986 PLM Open on the European Tour.

== Format ==
All participating teams played two qualification rounds of stroke-play, counting the four best scores out of up to six players for each team. The four best teams formed flight A, the next four teams formed flight B, the next three teams formed flight C and the last three teams formed flight D.

The standings in each flight was determined by a round-robin system. All teams in the flight met each other and the team with most points for team matches in flight A won the tournament, using the scale, win=2 points, halved=1 point, lose=0 points. In each match between two nation teams, three foursome games and six single games were played.

== Teams ==
14 nation teams contested the event. Each team consisted of a minimum of six players.

Country	Players
Austria	Hugo Hild, Fritz Jonak, Alexander Maculan, Klaus Nierlich, W. Pollak, H. Thurnher
Belgium	Eddy Carbonelle, Eric Tavernier, Philippe Washer, Freddy Rodesch, Paul Rolin, L. Velge
Denmark	Steen Andersen, John Jacobsen, Mogens Jørgensen, Peter Palsby, Erik Staerk, Ole Wiberg-Jørgensen
England	Michael Bonallack, Michael Burgess, Rodney Foster, Peter Green, David Moffat, David Palmer, Alan Thirlwell
Finland	Jalo Grönlund, Veikko Hämäläinen, Pentti Nurminen, Börje Nordman, Torsten Nyström, T. Savolainen, Mauri Vikström, Juhani Örmä
France	Guy d'Arcangues, Yves Caillol, Patrick Cros, Jean-Louis Dupont, Roger Lagarde, Gaëtan Mourgue D'Algue, Visscaux
Italy	Nadi Berruti, Franco Bevione, Brenciaglia, C. Bordogna, Angelo Croce, Alberto Schiaffino, Lorenzo Silva
Netherlands	Robbie E. van Erven Dorens, I.P. Eschauizer, Joan F. Dudok van Heel, Jani A.R. Roland Holst, Ajef F. Knappert, Olland, W.F. Smit
Norway	Jan Aaseth, Ellingsen, Frank Jacobsen, John Johansen, Kåre Kittelsen, Svein Knutsen, Arve Pedersen
Portugal	Nuno de Brito e Cunha, Fernando da Costa Cabral, Duarte Espirito Santo Silva, T. Lagos, Fernando Pinto Coelho, Manuel Leao
Spain	Enrigue Muro, Luis Alvarez de Bohorques, Duke of Fernán-Núñez, Iván Maura, Francisco Sanchiz, Ángel Sartorius
Sweden	Johny Anderson, Gustaf Adolf Bielke, Sten Eriksson, Göran Göransson, Claes Jöhncke, Rune Karlfeldt, Lennart Leinborn, Göran Lindeblad
Switzerland	Olivier Barras, G. Jacques-Dalcroze, Otto Dillier, Peter Gutermann, Max Lamm, Michael Rey
West Germany	Walter Brühne, P. van Elten, Peter Jochums, Dietrich von Knoop, Peter Möller, Helge Rademacher, Erik Sellschopp

== Winners ==
Team England, making its second appearance in the championship, won the gold, earning 6 points in flight A. Defending champion and host country Sweden took the silver medal on 4 points and West Germany, for the first time on the podium in the three-year history of the championship, earned the bronze on third place.

Team England

Individual winner in the opening 36-hole stroke-play qualifying competition was Rune Karlfeldt, Sweden, with a score of 3-under-par 139, three shots ahead of nearest competitor. Angelo Croce, Italy, shot a new course record in the second round, with a score of 67 over 18 holes on the Falsterbo course.

== Results ==
Qualification rounds

Team standings

Place	Country	Score	To par
1	England	291-289=580	+12
2	West Germany	292-291=583	+15
3	Sweden	291-293=584	+16
4	Italy	304-281=585	+17
5	France	305-286=591	+23
6	Spain	301-294=595	+27
7	Denmark	307-299=606	+38
8	Belgium	305-302=607	+39
9	Switzerland	308-300=608	+40
10	Netherlands	310-310=620	+52
11	Austria	311-317=628	+60
12	Norway	320-310=630	+62
13	Finland	314-319=633	+65
14	Portugal	331-318=649	+81

Individual leaders

Place	Player	Country	Score	To par
1	Rune Karlfeldt	Sweden	71-68=139	−3
2	Rodney Foster	England	71-71=142	E
T3	Michael Bonallack	England	71-72=143	+1
T3	Angelo Croce	Italy	76-67=143	+1
T3	Patrick Cros	France	74-69=143	+1
T3	Alan Thirwell	England	72-71=143	+1

Note: There was no official recognition for the lowest individual score.

Flight A

Team matches

2	England	Italy	0
5		4	

2	Sweden	West Germany	0
7.5		1.5	

2	England	Sweden	0
6		3	

2	West Germany	Italy	0
6		3	

2	England	West Germany	0
7.5		1.5	

2	Sweden	Italy	0
6		3	

Team standings

Country	Place	W	T	L	Game points	Points
England	1	3	0	0	18.5–8.5	6
Sweden	2	2	0	1	16.5–10.5	4
West Germany	3	1	0	2	9–18	2
Italy	4	0	0	3	10–17	0

Flight B

Team matches

2	France	Belgium	0
7.5		1.5	

2	Denmark	Spain	0
5.5		3.5	

2	Denmark	France	0
5.5		3.5	

2	Belgium	Spain	0
5		4	

2	Belgium	Denmark	0
9		0	

2	France	Spain	0
6.5		2.5	

Team standings

Country	Place	W	T	L	Game points	Points
France	5	2	0	1	17.5–9.5	4
Belgium	6	2	0	1	15.5–11.5	4
Denmark	7	2		1	11–16	4
Spain	8	0	0	0	10–17	0

Flight C

Team standings

Country	Place
Austria	9
Switzerland	10
Netherlands	11

Flight D

Team standings

Country	Place
Norway	12
Portugal	13
Finland	14

Final standings

Place	Country
1st place, gold medalist(s)	England
2nd place, silver medalist(s)	Sweden
3rd place, bronze medalist(s)	West Germany
4	Italy
5	France
6	Belgium
7	Denmark
8	Spain
9	Austria
10	Switzerland
11	Netherlands
12	Norway
13	Portugal
14	Finland

== See also ==
- Eisenhower Trophy – biennial world amateur team golf championship for men organized by the International Golf Federation.
- European Ladies' Team Championship – European amateur team golf championship for women organised by the European Golf Association.
