= Scottish Amateur Stroke Play Championship =

Tournament information
- Location: Scotland
- Established: 1967
- Organised by: Scottish Golf
- Format: Stroke play
- Month played: May/June

Current champion
- Greg Holmes

The Scottish Men's Open Amateur Stroke Play Championship is the national amateur stroke play golf championship in Scotland. Entry is open to all amateur golfers. It has been played annually since 1967 and is organised by the Scottish Golf. The format is 72-hole stroke-play contested over three days. After 36 holes the leading 40 competitors and ties play a further 36 holes on the final day.

== History ==
The event was started in 1967, based on the format of the Brabazon Trophy which had been played in England since 1947. It was held on 1 and 2 July with 36 holes played each day. Two courses, Muirfield and Gullane No. 1, were used on the first day after which the leading 40 and ties played 36 holes at Muirfield on the final day. Bernard Gallacher win with a score of 291, five strokes ahead of Charlie Green. A similar format was generally used in following years, with two courses used on the opening day. Starting in 1968 the championship was played in June for many years. Ronnie Shade won by six strokes in 1968 at Prestwick. There was another Scottish winner in 1969, Scott Macdonald, although two English golfers, Peter Benka and Rodney Foster were runners-up.

1970 saw the first non-Scottish winner, when the South African Dale Hayes won by four strokes. Ian Hutcheon won in 1971 and would win again in 1974 and 1979. Bert Nicholson won in 1972 while 1973 produced the only tie in the event, when Gordon Clark, from England, and David Robertson finished level. There was no playoff. the experienced Charlie Green won in 1975 while Steve Martin won by a record 11 strokes in 1976. There were further Scottish winners in 1977 and 1978 with Paul McKellar and Alistair Taylor. Mike Miller was a runner-up three times between 1975 and 1978 but never won the championship. Gordon Brand Jnr win in 1980 when the event was reduced to 54 holes by heavy rain on the first day.

The 1980s produced two overseas winners. In 1981, Philip Walton, from Ireland, won by a stroke from defending champion Gordon Brand Jnr, while in 1989 Frenchman François Illouz won by two strokes. Charlie Green won for the second time in 1984, while Colin Montgomerie won by five strokes in 1985. The 1990 event was reduced to 36 holes by harr. 1996 saw the first playoff in the championship. Alastair Forsyth and South African Hennie Otto were tied on 279 and it took nine sudden-death holes before Forsyth won. there were further playoffs in 2000 and 2001 won by Simon Mackenzie and the Australian John Sutherland.

Gary Wolstenholme won the 2003, the first English winner since 1973. Richie Ramsay won in 2004 with a record score of 269, but there was another English winner in 2005, Robert Dinwiddie. Wallace Booth won in 2008, a contest reduced to 54 holes. Tommy Fleetwood won in 2009 with a new record score of 268, eight strokes ahead of the field.

Pre-qualifying, for players without a guaranteed place, was introduced in 2022. A single round was played a few days before the championship.

== Winners ==
Year	Winner(s)	Score	Margin of victory	Runner(s)-up	Venue(s)	Ref.
2025	(England) Greg Holmes	272	2 strokes	(Denmark) Mads Heller	Glasgow Gailes Links	
2025	(England) Eliot Baker	264	1 stroke	(Australia) Billy Dowling	North Berwick	
2024	(England) Dominic Clemons	260	17 strokes	(South Africa) Jordan Burnand (Australia) Kai Komulainen	Muirfield	
2023	(Scotland) Connor Graham	265	4 strokes	(South Africa) Altin van der Merwe	Meldrum House	
2022	(England) Charlie Thornton	278	1 stroke	(England) John Gough	Cruden Bay	
2021	(England) Callan Barrow	261	3 strokes	(England) James Wilson	Southerness	
2020	Cancelled due to COVID-19 pandemic in Scotland					
2019	(England) Jake Bolton	272	1 stroke	(England) Sam Bairstow	The Duke's (St Andrews)	
2018	(France) Victor Veyret	268	6 strokes	(Republic of Ireland) Conor Purcell	Gleneagles, Kings Course	
2017	(Scotland) Liam Johnston	275	2 strokes	(England) Matthew Jordan	Western Gailes	
2016	(Australia) Cameron John	269	4 strokes	(Scotland) Grant Forrest (Republic of Ireland) Stuart Grehan	Gullane No.1	
2015	(England) Marco Penge	278	1 stroke	(Scotland) Graeme Robertson	Moray	
2014	(Republic of Ireland) Gavin Moynihan	275	2 strokes	(Australia) Geoff Drakeford (Republic of Ireland) Jack Hume (England) Nick Marsh	Panmure	
2013	(England) Garrick Porteous	277	4 strokes	(Northern Ireland) Dermot McElroy (Republic of Ireland) Richie O'Donovan (England) Callum Shinkwin	Southerness	
2012	(France) Paul Barjon	282	4 strokes	(Australia) Rory Bourke (South Africa) Haydn Porteous	Kilmarnock (Barassie)	
2011	(England) Andy Sullivan	282	1 stroke	(England) Steven Brown	Blairgowrie, Lansdowne	
2010	(France) Romain Wattel	275	6 strokes	(England) Billy Hemstock	Glasgow, Gailes Links	
2009	(England) Tommy Fleetwood	268	8 strokes	(Scotland) Gavin Dear	Murcar Links	
2008	(Scotland) Wallace Booth	210 (Note: Event reduced to 54 holes because of adverse weather.)	4 strokes	(France) Édouard Dubois	The Duke's (St Andrews)	
2007	(Scotland) Kevin McAlpine	271	2 strokes	(Scotland) James Byrne (France) Alexandre Kaleka	Royal Dornoch	
2006	(Scotland) Scott Henry	277	1 stroke	(England) Ross McGowan	Craigielaw	
2005	(England) Robert Dinwiddie	281	3 strokes	(Scotland) Jonathan King	Royal Aberdeen	
2004	(Scotland) Richie Ramsay	269	1 stroke	(Finland) Roope Kakko	Lundin Links	
2003	(England) Gary Wolstenholme	273	4 strokes	(England) Richard Walker	Turnberry, Kintyre	
2002	(Scotland) Barry Hume	277	2 strokes	(Scotland) David Inglis (Scotland) Simon Mackenzie	Southerness	
2001	(Australia) John Sutherland	279	Playoff (Note: Sutherland beat Carmichael with a birdie at the third extra hole.)	(Scotland) Steven Carmichael	Nairn/Nairn Dunbar	
2000	(Scotland) Simon Mackenzie	278	Playoff (Note: Mackenzie beat Hume with a birdie at the first extra hole.)	(Scotland) Barry Hume	Letham Grange	
1999	(Scotland) Graham Rankin	286	3 strokes	(Scotland) Mark Loftus	St Andrews	
1998	(Scotland) Lorne Kelly	275	6 strokes	(Scotland) Steven Carmichael	Moray/Elgin	
1997	(Scotland) Barclay Howard	271	8 strokes	(Australia) Geoff Ogilvy (England) Robert Wiggins	Monifieth/Panmure	
1996	(Scotland) Alastair Forsyth	279	Playoff (Note: Forsyth beat Otto with a par at the ninth extra hole.)	(South Africa) Hennie Otto	Cardross/Helensburgh	
1995	(Scotland) Stephen Gallacher	282	1 stroke	(Scotland) Simon Mackenzie	Paisley/Renfrew	
1994	(Scotland) David Downie	288	1 stroke	(Belgium) Nicolas Vanhootegem	Letham Grange	
1993	(Scotland) Alan Reid	289	1 stroke	(Scotland) Dean Robertson	St Andrews	
1992	(Scotland) Dean Robertson	281	2 strokes	(Scotland) Scott Knowles	Mortonhall/Bruntsfield Links	
1991	(Scotland) Andrew Coltart	295	2 strokes	(Scotland) David Carrick	Royal Troon	
1990	(Scotland) Garry Hay	133 (Note: Event reduced to 36 holes because of adverse weather.)	3 strokes	(Scotland) Simon Mackenzie	Royal Aberdeen/Murcar	
1989	(France) François Illouz	281	2 strokes	(England) Craig Cassels (Scotland) Craig Everett (Scotland) Jim Milligan	Blairgowrie	
1988	(Scotland) Stephen Easingwood	277	6 strokes	(England) Craig Cassels (Scotland) Hamish Kemp	Cathkin Braes/East Kilbride	
1987	(Scotland) David Carrick	282	6 strokes	(Scotland) Ian Hutcheon	Lundin Links/Ladybank	
1986	(Scotland) Kenny Walker	289	3 strokes	(Scotland) Graeme Shaw	Carnoustie	
1985	(Scotland) Colin Montgomerie	274	5 strokes	(Sweden) John Lindberg	Dunbar/North Berwick	
1984	(Scotland) Charlie Green	287	1 stroke	(Scotland) Lee Vannet	Blairgowrie	
1983	(Scotland) Gordon Murray	291	3 strokes	(Scotland) Steve Campbell (Scotland) Paul Girvan (Scotland) Charlie Green	Irvine/Irvine Ravenspark	
1982	(Scotland) George Macgregor	287	3 strokes	(France) Jean-Charles Gassiat	Downfield/Camperdown	
1981	(Republic of Ireland) Philip Walton	287	1 stroke	(Scotland) Gordon Brand Jnr	Renfrew/Erskine	
1980	(Scotland) Gordon Brand Jnr	207	1 stroke	(Scotland) Garry Hay (Scotland) George Macgregor	Musselburgh/Royal Musselburgh	
1979	(Scotland) Ian Hutcheon	296	1 stroke	(Scotland) Barclay Howard (Scotland) George Macgregor	Blairgowrie	
1978	(Scotland) Alistair Taylor	281	3 strokes	(Scotland) Keith Macintosh (Scotland) Mike Miller	Cawder	
1977	(Scotland) Paul McKellar	299	6 strokes	(Scotland) Mike Miller	Muirfield/Gullane	
1976	(Scotland) Steve Martin	283	11 strokes	(Scotland) Peter Wilson	Carnoustie/Monifieth	
1975	(Scotland) Charlie Green	295	1 stroke	(Scotland) George Macgregor (Scotland) Mike Miller	Nairn/Nairn Dunbar	
1974	(Scotland) Ian Hutcheon	283	1 stroke	(Scotland) David Tierney	Blairgowrie/Alyth	
1973	(England) Gordon Clark (Scotland) David Robertson	284	Tied	–	Dunbar/North Berwick	
1972	(Scotland) Bert Nicholson	290	1 stroke	(Scotland) Neil Rowberry	Dalmahoy/Ratho Park	
1971	(Scotland) Ian Hutcheon	277	5 strokes	(Scotland) Alistair Wilson	Leven/Lundin Links	
1970	(South Africa) Dale Hayes	275	4 strokes	(Scotland) Allan Brodie (Scotland) Alistair Thomson	Glasgow Gailes/Barassie	
1969	(Scotland) Scott Macdonald	288	3 strokes	(England) Peter Benka (England) Rodney Foster	Carnoustie/Monifieth	
1968	(Scotland) Ronnie Shade	282	6 strokes	(Scotland) Gordon Cosh	Prestwick/Prestwick St. Nicholas	
1967	(Scotland) Bernard Gallacher	291	5 strokes	(Scotland) Charlie Green	Muirfield/Gullane No. 1	

== See also ==
- Scottish Amateur
- Helen Holm Scottish Women's Open Championship – the equivalent championship for women
