= 1959 European Amateur Team Championship =

Golf competition

Tournament information
- Dates: 22–27 June 1959
- Location: Barcelona, Catalonia, Spain; 41°17′49″N 002°04′42″E
- Course: Real Club de Golf El Prat
- Organized by: European Golf Association
- Format: 36 holes stroke play round-robin system match play

Statistics
- Par: 72
- Length: 6,359 yards (5,815 m)
- Field: 9 teams circa 60 players

Champion
- Sweden; Ola Bergqvist, Gustaf Adolf Bielke, Gunnar Carlander, Per-Olof Johansson, Göran Lindeblad, Bengt Möller, Nils Odqvist (captain and substitute player), Elis Werkell
- Qualification round: 612 (+36); Flight A matches: 5 points
- Location in Europe Location in Spain Location in the Province of Barcelona

The 1959 European Amateur Team Championship took place 22–27 June on the Real Club de Golf El Prat outside Barcelona, Spain. It was the first men's golf European Amateur Team Championship.

== Venue ==
The championship took place in strong heat at Real Club de Golf El Prat, Barcelona, Spain. The club was founded in 1912. It was at the time a private club and the course was situated in El Prat de Llobregat, 15 kilometers south of the city center, close to the Barcelona-El Prat Airport. In 1997, when the airport expanded, the club had to move its course and in 2003 the club established 45 holes in Terrassa, 30 kilometers north of Barcelona. The club hosted the professional tournament Open de Espana in both 1956 and 1959 and had done so several times since.

=== Course layout ===
Hole	Meters	Par	Hole	Meters	Par
1	365	4	10	450	5
2	250	4	11	130	3
3	150	3	12	430	5
4	285	4	13	320	4
5	360	4	14	400	4
6	160	3	15	480	5
7	355	4	16	380	4
8	335	4	17	150	3
9	440	5	18	345	4
Out	2,730	35	In	3,085	37
Source:		Total		5,815	72

== Format ==
All participating teams played two qualification rounds of stroke-play over two days, counting the four best scores out of up to six players for each team. The four best teams formed flight A. The next four best teams formed flight B.

The winner in each flight was determined by a round-robin system. All teams in the flight met each other with six players in each team and the team with most points for team matches in flight A won the tournament, using the scale, win=2 points, halved=1 point, lose=0 points. In each match between two nation teams, three foursome games and six single games were played. The teams were allowed to change players from one day to another, but not during a day from morning to afternoon.

== Teams ==
Nine nation teams contested the event. Each team consisted of a minimum of six players.

Players in the leading teams

Country	Players
Belgium	Jacky Moerman, Eric Tavernier
France	Henri de Lamaze, Marius Bardana, Yves Caillol, Philippe Chassigny, Jean-Louis Dupont, Gaëtan Mourgue D'Algue
Italy	Franco Bevione, P. Rivetti, Alberto Schiaffino
Spain	Juan Antonio Andreu, Iván Maura, Enrigue Muro, Eduardo de la Riva, Fransisco Sanchiz, Ignacio Urguijo
Sweden	Ola Bergqvist, Gustaf Adolf Bielke, Gunnar Carlander, Per-Olof Johansson, Göran Lindeblad, Bengt Möller, Nils Odqvist,* Elis Werkell
Switzerland	André Barras, Olivier Barras, Otto Dillier, Pierre Ducrey, D. Gütermann, Peter Gütermann, Ruedi Müller
West Germany	Hermann Ernst, Jost Burghartz, Werner Götz, Hans Lampert, Dietrich von Knoop, Hermann Tissies

* Note: Odqvist entered the tournament as non-playing captain, but since Lindeblad and Möller was not able to play on 25 June in Sweden's match against Spain and Bielke and Carlander was not able to play on 26 June in Sweden's match against West Germany, due to food poisoning, Odqist played in those two matches.

Other participating teams

Country
Netherlands
Portugal

== Winners ==
Team Sweden won the championship, earning 5 points in flight A. Team France finished second, ahead of host country Spain.

Individual winner in the opening 36-hole stroke-play qualifying competition was Dietrich von Knoop, West Germany, with a score of 2-over-par 146. Henri de Lamaze, France, shot a new course record in the second round, with a score of 69 over 18 holes at the El Prat course.

Team Sweden

== Results ==
Qualification rounds

Team standings

Place	Country	Score	To par
1	Sweden	304-308=612	+36
2	France	320-295=615	+39
3	West Germany	311-311=622	+46
4	Spain	319-305=624	+48
T5	Belgium	315-319=634	+58
T5	Switzerland	315-319=634	+58
7	Italy	321-316=637	+61
8	Netherlands	327-319=646	+70
9	Portugal	335-343=678	+102

Individual leader

Place	Player	Country	Score	To par
1	Dietrich von Knoop	West Germany	74-72=146	+2

Note: There was no official recognition for the lowest individual score.

Flight A

Team matches

2	Sweden	Spain	0
6		3	

2	France	West Germany	0
5.5		3.5	

1	Sweden	West Germany	1
4.5		4.5	

2	France	Spain	0
5		4	

2	Sweden	France	0
5		4	

2	Spain	West Germany	0
7		2	

Team standings

Country	Place	W	T	L	Game points	Points
Sweden	1	2	1	0	15.5–11.5	5
France	2	2	0	1	14.5–12.5	4
Spain	3	1	0	2	14–13	2
West Germany	4	0	1	2	12–15	1

Flight B

Team matches

2	Belgium	Netherlands	0
8.5		0.5	

2	Italy	Switzerland	0
5.5		3.5	

2	Belgium	Switzerland	0
5.5		3.5	

2	Italy	Netherlands	0
6		3	

2	Italy	Belgium	0
8.5		0.5	

2	Switzerland	Netherlands	0
7		2	

Team standings

Country	Place	W	T	L	Game points	Points
Italy	5	3	0	0	20–7	6
Belgium	6	2	0	1	14.5–12.5	4
Switzerland	7	1	0	2	14–13	2
Netherlands	8	0	0	3	21.5–5.5	0

Final standings

Place	Country
1st place, gold medalist(s)	Sweden
2nd place, silver medalist(s)	France
3rd place, bronze medalist(s)	Spain
4	West Germany
5	Italy
6	Belgium
7	Switzerland
8	Netherlands
9	Portugal

== See also ==
- Eisenhower Trophy – biennial world amateur team golf championship for men organized by the International Golf Federation.
- European Ladies' Team Championship – European amateur team golf championship for women organised by the European Golf Association.
