= 1975 European Amateur Team Championship =

Golf competition

Tournament information
- Dates: 26–29 June 1975
- Location: Killarney, County Kerry, Ireland; 52.060459°N 9.563379°W
- Course: Killarney Golf & Fishing Club (Mahony's Point Course)
- Organized by: European Golf Association
- Format: Qualification round: 18 holes stroke play Knock-out match-play

Statistics
- Par: 73
- Length: 6,727 yards (6,151 m)
- Field: 18 teams 108 players

Champion
- Scotland; Charlie Green, Ian Hutcheon, George MacGregor, Gordon Murray; Sandy Stephen, Hugh Stuart
- Qualification round: 368 (+3); Final: 4.5–2.5

Location map
- Location in Europe Location in the British Isles Location in Ireland

The 1975 European Amateur Team Championship took place 28 June – 1 July at Killarney Golf & Fishing Club, Killarney, Ireland. It was the ninth men's golf European Amateur Team Championship.

== Venue ==
The tournament was played at the club's 18-hole Mahony's Point Course, opened in 1939 on the shore of Lough Leane, 3 kilometres west of Killarney, County Kerry, Ireland.

The course was set up with par 35 over the first nine holes and par 38 on the second nine, finishing with a par 3 hole.

The course was dry and the whether warm and sunny during the whole tournament.

=== Course layout ===
Hole	Meters	Par	Hole	Meters	Par
1	325	4	10	326	4
2	346	4	11	368	4
3	176	3	12	461	5
4	325	4	13	437	5
5	448	5	14	346	4
6	148	3	15	250	4
7	368	4	16	474	5
8	387	4	17	370	4
9	411	4	18	185	3
Out	2,934	35	In	3,217	38
Source:		Total		6,151	73

== Format ==
All participating teams played one qualification round of stroke-play with six players, and counted the five best scores for each team.

The eight best teams formed flight A, in knock-out match-play over the next three days. The teams were seeded based on their positions after the stroke play. The first placed team was drawn to play the quarter-final against the eight placed team, the second against the seventh, the third against the sixth and the fourth against the fifth. In each match between two national teams, two 18-hole foursome games and five 18-hole single games were played. Teams were allowed to use six players during the team matches, selecting four of them in the morning foursome matches and five players in to the afternoon single matches. Games all square at the 18th hole were declared halved, if the team match was already decided.

The six teams placed 9–14 in the qualification stroke-play formed Flight B to play similar knock-out play to decide their final positions. The four teams placed 15–18 formed Flight C, to meet each other to decide their final positions.

== Teams ==
18 nation teams contested the event. Each team consisted of six players.

Country	Players
Austria	Uli Berlinger, M. Gohn, J. Göss-Saurau, E. Huber, Lampert Stolz, W. Wewalka
Belgium	John Bigwood, Benoit Dumont, Thierry Goosens, Yves Mahain, Freddy Rodesch, Jean Rolin, R. de Vooght
Denmark	Kjeld Friche, Lars Jacobsen, Niels Elsøe.Jensen, Henry Knudsen, John Nielsen, Jens Thomasen
England	John Davies, Richard Eyles, Peter Hedges, Mark James, Geoff Marks, Martin Poxon
Finland	Patrick Halamaa, Hannu Kussaari, Harry Safonoff, Kari Salonen, Juha Utter, Lauri Wirkala
France	Sven Boinet, Hervé Frayssineau, Alexis Godillot, George Leven, Tim Planchin, Philippe Ploujoux
Iceland	Torbjörn Kjaerbo, Einar Gudnason, Ragnar Olafsson, Oskar Saemundsson, Björgvin Thorsteinsson, S. Thorarensen
Ireland	Eddie Dunne, Ian Elliott, Jack Harrington, Brian Malone, Pat Mulcare, Hugh Smyth
Italy	Stefano Betti, Franco Gigliarelli, Antonio Lionello, Lorenzo Silva, Giuseppe Sita, Carlo Tadini
Luxembourg	A, Graas, N. Graas, Y. Görgen, C. Schock, J. Schock, G. Schumann
Netherlands	Carel Braun, Barend van Dam, T. Krol, Bart Nolte, Jaap van Neck, Victor Swane
Norway	Erik Dønnestad, Petter Dønnestad, Ole-Christian Hammer, Johan Horn, Asbjörn Ramnefjell, Leif Stensrud
Scotland	Charlie Green, Ian Hutcheon, George MacGregor, Gordon Murray, Sandy Stephen, Hugh Stuart
Spain	Santiago Fernández, José Gancedo, Ivan Maura, A. Perales, Nicasio Sagardia, Román Taya
Sweden	Dag Aurell, Bob Bäckstedt, Hans Hedjerson, Göran Lundqvist, Jan Rube, Michael Örtegren
Switzerland	Yves Hofstetter, Thomas Fortmann, Martin Kessler, Carlo Rampone, Michel Rey, Johnny Storjohann
Wales	John Jermine, David McLean, Hew Squirell, Jeff Toye, John Povall, Iestyn Tucker
West Germany	Hans-Hubert Giesen, Freidrich Janssen, Christoph Kilian, Hans Lampert, Veit Pagel, Christian Strenger

== Winners ==
Scotland won the gold medal, earning their first title, beating Italy in the final 4.5–2.5. The Scottish team won the qualifying competition for the fourth consecutive occasion and had previously in the history of the championship finished second three times, losing the last two finals to England.

Team Sweden, earned the bronze on third place, just as at the previous event two years earlier, after beating Switzerland 4–3 in the bronze match.

Defending champions England did not make it to the quarter-finals, finishing tied 8th in the qualifying competition and losing the tie-breaker to France with a one stroke higher non-counting sixth score. Team Wales' low scorer Jeff Toye holed from eight feet on both of his last two greens, giving his team a final one-stroke advantage over England and France, but the sixth score for Wales would not have beaten the sixth scores of neither England or France in the event of a tie.

Individual leader in the opening 18-hole stroke-play qualifying competition was Ian Hutcheon, Scotland, with a score of 3-under-par 70. There was no official award for the lowest individual score.

== Results ==
Qualification round

Team standings

Place	Country	Score	To par
1	Scotland	368	+3
2	Italy	377	+12
T3	Sweden *	378	+13
T3	West Germany *	378	+13
T3	Switzerland	378	+13
6	Ireland	380	+15
7	Wales	382	+17
T8	France *	383	+18
T8	England	383	+18
10	Spain	395	+30
11	Norway	402	+37
T12	Belgium *	403	+38
T12	Netherlands	403	+38
14	Denmark	405	+40
15	Finland	412	+47
16	Iceland	426	+61
T17	Luxembourg *	431	+66
T17	Austria	431	+66

* Note: In the event of a tie the order was determined by the better non-counting score.

Individual leaders

Place	Player	Country	Score	To par
1	Ian Hutcheon	Scotland	70	−3
2	Geoff Marks	England	71	−2
T3	Stefano Betti	Italy	72	−1
T3	Lorenzo Silva	Italy	72	−1
T3	Giuseppe Sita	Italy	72	−1
T6	Göran Lundqvist	Sweden	73	E
T6	Philippe Ploujoux	France	73	E
T6	Jeff Toye	Wales	73	E
T9	Charlie Green	Scotland	74	+1
T9	Yves Hofstetter	Switzerland	74	+1
T9	Freidrich Janssen	West Germany	74	+1
T9	Christoph Kilian	West Germany	74	+1
T9	George MacGregor	Scotland	74	+1
T9	John Povall	Wales	74	+1
T9	Jan Rube	Sweden	74	+1
T9	Johnny Storjohann	Switzerland	74	+1

Note: There was no official award for the lowest individual score.

Flight A

Bracket

Quarter finals
Italy	5
Wales	2
Sweden	5.5
Ireland	1.5
Switzerland	5
West Germany	2
Scotland	6
France	1

Semi finals
Italy	5
Sweden	2
Scotland	5
Switzerland	2

Final
Scotland	4.5
Italy	2.5
Bronze match
Sweden	4
Switzerland	3

Elimination matches
France	4.5
Wales	2.5
Switzerland	4.5
West Germany	2.5

Match for 5th place
Wales	6
West Germany	1
Match for 7th place
Ireland	4
France	3

Final games

Scotland	Italy
4.5	2.5
I. Hutcheon / C. Green	L. Silva / A. Lionelli 19th
H. Stuart / G. MacGregor 5 & 3	S. Betti / G. Sita
Hugh Stuart 2 & 1	Carlo Tadini
Ian Hutcheon AS*	Antonio Lionelli AS*
Sandy Stephen	Giuseppe Sita 1 hole
Charlie Green 3 & 2	Stefano Betti
George MacGregor 6 & 5	Lorenzo Silva

* Note: Game declared halved, since team match already decided.

Flight B

Elimination matches

England	Norway
5	2

Spain	Netherlands
5	2

Norway	Denmark
4	3

Netherlands	Belgium
5	2

Match for 13th place

Denmark	Belgium
5	2

Match for 11th place

Netherlands	Norway
4	3

Match for 9th place

England	Spain
5	2

Flight C

First round

Luxembourg	Iceland
5	2

Finland	Austria
4.5	2.5

Second round

Iceland	Austria
6	1

Finland	Luxembourg
4	3

Third round

Iceland	Finland
4.5	2.5

Luxembourg	Austria
4	3

Final standings

Place	Country
1st place, gold medalist(s)	Scotland
2nd place, silver medalist(s)	Italy
3rd place, bronze medalist(s)	Sweden
4	Switzerland
5	Wales
6	West Germany
7	Ireland
8	France
9	England
10	Spain
11	Netherlands
12	Norway
13	Denmark
14	Belgium
15	Iceland
16	Luxembourg
17	Finland
18	Austria

== See also ==
- Eisenhower Trophy – biennial world amateur team golf championship for men organized by the International Golf Federation.
- European Ladies' Team Championship – European amateur team golf championship for women organised by the European Golf Association.
