= Bruce Critchley =

UK TV broadcaster and commentator

Personal information
- Full name: Bruce Fishwick Critchley
- Nationality: England
- Born: 9 December 1942 (age 83) London, England

Career
- Sport: Golf
- Status: Amateur

Bruce Fishwick Critchley (born 9 December 1942) is a UK TV broadcaster and commentator who worked for the BBC in the 1980s and from the early 1990s was a member of Sky Sports golf broadcasting team until his retirement in the mid-2010s.

== Background ==
Critchley was the son of Air Commodore Alfred Critchley and his third wife, Diana Fishwick. His father was a useful amateur golfer and had won the Addington Foursomes in 1939 partnered by Dai Rees. His mother had won the British Ladies Amateur Golf Championship in 1930 and had played in the Curtis Cup in 1932 and 1934 and was non-playing captain in 1950.

== Golf ==
Critchley was never a professional golfer unlike many of his fellow broadcasters. He won the Worplesdon Mixed Foursomes in 1961, partnered by Frances Smith, and he first played for England as an amateur at the age of nineteen in 1962. Seven years later he was picked to play for Great Britain & Ireland against America in the 1969 Walker Cup. That same year he was a member of the England team that won the European Amateur Team Championship and he also reached the final of the Worplesdon Mixed Foursomes. In 1970 he was runner-up in the Golf Illustrated Gold Vase, finishing a stroke behind the winner, and reached the semi-finals of the Amateur Championship before losing 2&1 to the eventual winner Michael Bonallack.

== Tournament wins ==
- 1961 Worplesdon Mixed Foursomes (with Frances Smith)
- 1964 Sunningdale Foursomes (with Robin Hunter)
- 1969 Hampshire Hog, Surrey Amateur
- 1974 The Antlers (Royal Mid-Surrey)

== Team appearances ==
Amateur

- Walker Cup (representing Great Britain & Ireland): 1969
- St Andrews Trophy (representing Great Britain & Ireland): 1970 (winners)
- European Amateur Team Championship (representing England): 1969 (winners)
- Men's Home Internationals (representing England): 1962 (joint winners), 1969 (winners), 1970
