= 1971 European Amateur Team Championship =

Golf competition

Tournament information
- Dates: 24–27 June 1971
- Location: Lausanne, Switzerland; 46.561°N 6.676°E
- Course: Golf Club de Lausanne
- Organized by: European Golf Association
- Format: Qualification round: 18 holes stroke play Knock-out match-play

Statistics
- Par: 72
- Length: 6,885 yards (6,296 m)
- Field: 17 teams circa 102 players

Champion
- England; Michael Bonallack, Rodney Foster, Warren Humphreys; Michael King, Geoff Marks, David Marsh
- Qualification round: 368 (+13); Final: 4.5–2.5

Location map
- Location in Europe Location in Switzerland

The 1971 European Amateur Team Championship took place 24–27 June at Golf Club de Lausanne, in Lausanne, Switzerland. It was the seventh men's golf European Amateur Team Championship.

== Venue ==
The hosting club was Golf Club de Lausanne, founded in 1921, with its course, at an altitude of 850 metres, situated 5 kilometers north of Lausanne. 18 holes were completed and inaugurated in 1931. With most of the holes modified, a new course, designed by greenkeeper Hermann Narbel, were created and completed in 1962.

During three practice days before the tournament, the weather was warm and sunny, but on the first day of competition, play was interrupted several times due to heavy rain.

=== Course layout ===
Hole	Meters	Par	Hole	Meters	Par
1	390	4	10	400	4
2	380	4	11	140	3
3	136	3	12	325	4
4	385	4	13	465	5
5	395	4	14	365	4
6	505	5	15	390	4
7	315	4	16	375	4
8	190	3	17	155	3
9	490	5	18	495	5
Out	3,186	36	In	3,110	36
Source:		Total		6,296	72

== Format ==
All participating teams played one qualification round of stroke-play with up to six players, counted the five best scores for each team.

The eight best teams formed flight A, in knock-out match-play over the next three days. The teams were seeded based on their positions after the stroke play. Each of the four best placed teams were drawn to play the quarter-final against one of the teams in the flight placed in the next four positions. In each match between two nation teams, two 18-hole foursome games and five 18-hole single games were played. Teams were allowed to switch players during the team matches, selecting other players in to the afternoon single matches after the morning foursome matches.

The six teams placed 9–14 in the qualification stroke-play formed Flight B to play similar knock-out play and the three teams placed 15–17 formed Flight C to meet each other, to decide their final positions.

== Teams ==
17 nation teams contested the event. Each team consisted of six players.

Players in the teams

Country	Players
Austria	J. Kyrle, Max Lamberg, Klaus Nierlich, Peter Nierlich, Helmuth Reichel, Lampert Stolz
Belgium	John Bigwood, Yves Brose, Eddy Carbonnelle, O. Carbonnelle, Jacky Moerman, Freddy Rodesch
Czechoslovakia	Jan Dvorak, Jiri Dvorak, J. Fuchs, A. Kopta, Jan Kunsta, Jiri Kunsta
Denmark	Nils Elsøe Jensen, Kjeld Friche, Klaus Hove, Henry Knudsen, John Nielsen, Hans Stenderup
England	Michael Bonallack, Rodney Foster, Warren Humphreys, Michael King, Geoff Marks, David Marsh
Finland	Jalo Grönlund, Hannu Kussaari, Klas Hirn, P.E. Nurminen, Harry Safonoff, Lauri Wirkala
France	Didier Charmat, René Darrieumerlou, Jean-Charles Desbordes, Alexis Godillot, Roger Lagarde, Henri de Lamaze
Ireland	Roddy Carr, Tom Craddock, Brian Hoey, Raymond Kane, Brian Malone, Martin O'Brien
Italy	Stefano Cimatti, L. Fabrini, Franco Gigliarelli, Delio Lovato, Lorenzo Silva, Carlo Tadini
Netherlands	Carel Braun, Lout Meertens, Jaap van Neck, Teun Rozenburg, Piet-Hein Streutgers, Victor Swane
Norway	Erik Dønnestad, Olaf Eie, Yngve Eriksen, Johan Horn, Svend Knutsen, Asbjørn Ramnefjell
Scotland	Charlie Green, Matt Lygate, Scott Macdonald, George MacGregor, Alistair Thomson, Hugh Stuart
Spain	Álvaro Arana, Santiago Fernández, José Gancedo, José Luis Noguer, Roman Taya, Javier Viladomiu
Sweden	Olle Dahlgren, Hans Hedjerson, Claës Jöhncke, Johan Jöhncke, Gunnar Mueller, Jan Rube
Switzerland	Thomas Fortmann, Yves Hofstetter, Martin Kessler, Uli Lamm, Peter Müller, Jürg Pesko
Wales	David Adams, Simon Cox, Ted Davies, Hew Squirell, Jeff Toye, John Povall
West Germany	Freidrich Janssen, Hans-Günther Heinrigs, Peter Jochums, Jan Müller, Veit Pagel, Jürgen Weghmann

== Winners ==
Defending champions England won the gold medal, earning their third title, beating Scotland 5–2 in the final. Team Norway, for the first time on the podium, earned the bronze on third place, after beating Spain 4–3 in the bronze match.

Individual leaders in the opening 18-hole stroke-play qualifying competition was Martin Kessler, Switzerland, Klaus Nierlich, Austria and Hugh Stuart, Scotland, tied first, each with a score of 1-over-par 73. There was no official award for the lowest individual scores.

== Results ==
Qualification round

Team standings

Place	Country	Score	To par
1	Scotland	380	+20
2	Spain	384	+24
3	France	386	+26
T4	Norway *	387	+27
T4	Switzerland	387	+27
6	England	388	+28
7	Wales	391	+31
8	Ireland	392	+32
9	Denmark	393	+33
10	West Germany	395	+35
11	Sweden	396	+36
T12	Netherlands *	397	+37
T12	Austria	397	+37
14	Italy	407	+47
15	Finland	409	+49
16	Belgium	412	+52
17	Czechoslovakia	422	+62

* Note: In the event of a tie the order was determined by the better non-counting score.

Individual leaders

Place	Player	Country	Score	To par
T1	Martin Kessler	Switzerland	73	+1
T1	Klaus Nierlich	Austria	73	+1
T1	Hugh Stuart	Scotland	73	+1
T4	Yngve Eriksen	Norway	74	+2
T4	Thomas Fortmann	Switzerland	74	+2
T4	Scott MacDonald	Scotland	74	+2
T7	Alex Godillot	France	75	+3
T7	Peter Müller	Switzerland	75	+3
T7	Jeff Toye	Wales	75	+3
T7	Veit Pagel	Germany	75	+3

Note: There was no official award for the lowest individual score.

Flight A

Bracket

Quarter finals
Spain	4
Wales	3
England	4
France	3
Norway	4.5
Switzerland	2.5
Scotland	4
Ireland	3

Semi finals
England	6
Spain	1
Scotland	7
Norway	0

Final
England	5
Scotland	2
Bronze match
Norway	4
Spain	3

Elimination matches
Wales	7
France	0
Ireland	5
Switzerland	2

Match for 5th place
Ireland	5
Wales	2
Match for 7th place
France	5
Switzerland	2

Final games

England	Scotland
5	2
M. Bonallack / W. Humphreys 19th	C. Green / G. MacGrecor
R. Foster / G. Marks	H. Stuart / A. Thomson 20th
Rodney Foster 3 & 2	Charlie Green
Geoff Marks 1 hole	Scott MacDonald
Michael Bonallack 2 holes	Hugh Smart
Warren Humphreys	Matt Lygate 1 hole
Michael King 4 & 3	George MacGregor

Flight B

Elimination matches

Sweden	Italy
5.5	1.5

Netherlands	Austria
5.5	1.5

Denmark	Netherlands
4	3

Sweden	West Germany
5	2

Match for 13th place

Italy	Austria
5	2

Match for 11th place

West Germany	Netherlands
4	3

Match for 9th place

Denmark	Sweden
4	3

Flight C

Czechoslovakia	Finland
6	1

Belgium	Finland
4	3

Belgium	Czechoslovakia
6	1

Final standings

Place	Country
1st place, gold medalist(s)	England
2nd place, silver medalist(s)	Scotland
3rd place, bronze medalist(s)	Norway
4	Spain
5	Ireland
6	Wales
7	France
8	Switzerland
9	Denmark
10	Sweden
11	West Germany
12	Netherlands
13	Italy
14	Austria
15	Belgium
16	Czechoslovakia
17	Finland

== See also ==
- Eisenhower Trophy – biennial world amateur team golf championship for men organized by the International Golf Federation.
- European Ladies' Team Championship – European amateur team golf championship for women organised by the European Golf Association.
