= 1972 Eisenhower Trophy =

Coordinates: 34.467°S 58.699°W

Tournament information
- Dates: 18–21 October
- Location: Buenos Aires, Argentina
- Course: Olivos Golf Club
- Format: 72 holes stroke play

Statistics
- Par: 71
- Length: 6,684 yards (6,112 m)
- Field: 32 teams 128 players

Champion
- United States; Ben Crenshaw, Vinny Giles, Mark Hayes & Marty West
- 865 (+13)

The 1972 Eisenhower Trophy took place 18 to 21 October at the Olivos Golf Club in Buenos Aires, Argentina. It was the eighth World Amateur Team Championship for the Eisenhower Trophy. The tournament was a 72-hole stroke play team event with 32 four-man teams. The best three scores for each round counted towards the team total.

The United States won the Eisenhower Trophy for the third successive time, finishing five strokes ahead of the silver medalists, Australia. South Africa took the bronze medal while Spain finished fourth. Tony Gresham from Australia had the lowest individual score, one-over-par 285, two strokes better than two Americans, Ben Crenshaw and Vinny Giles.

== Teams ==
32 four-man teams contested the event.

Country	Players
Argentina	Horacio Carbonetti, Luis Daneri, Juan Carlos Devoto, Roberto Monguzzi
Australia	Mike Cahill, Terry Gale, Tony Gresham, Noel Ratcliffe
Bahamas	Valdo Prosa, Robert Slatter, Basil Smith, Michael Taylor
Belgium	Yves Brose, Benoit Dumont, Yves Maham, Fredric Rodesch
Bermuda	Brendam Ingham, Lois Moniz, Keith Pearman, Noel van Putten
Brazil	Joao Barbosa Correa, Jaime Gonzalez, Ricardo R. Rossi, Carlos A. Sozio
Canada	Keith Alexander, Dave Barr, Doug Roxburgh, Nick Weslock
Chile	Benjamin Astaburuaga Jr, Mauricio Galeno, Ricardo Orellana, Felipe Taverne
Chinese Taipei	Chen Chien-chin, Fa Hung, Lu Tze-chi, Tsai Lung-tsu
Colombia	Diego Correa Gomez, Ricardo Sala, Emilio Saidi Aparicio, Fernando Arriola Sierra
Dominican Republic	Jack Corrie, Luis F. Henriquez, Salomom Melgen, Arturo Pellerano
Ecuador	Carlos M. Cobo, Fernando Fiore, Antony Gittes, Isidro Icaza
El Salvador	Guillermo Aceto, Mauricio Alvarez, Henry Daubin, Jaime Munguia
France	Alexis Godillot, Roger Lagarde, Philippe Ploujoux, Michel Tapia
Great Britain & Ireland	Michael Bonallack, Charlie Green, Trevor Homer, Hugh Stuart
Italy	Luca Fabrini, Delio Lovato, Alberto Schiaffino, Lorenzo Silva
Japan	Tsutomu Irie, Tetsuo Sakata, Zenjiro Takano, Kazunari Takahashi
Malaysia	Kwan C. Choo, Jalal Deran, Rashid Mallal, Saad Yusoff
Mexico	Enrique Farias, Carlos Perez Acosta, Mauricio Urdaneta, Ricardo Vega
Netherlands	Jaap van Neck, Teun Roosenburg, Piet-Hein Streutgers, Victor Swane
New Zealand	Geoff Clarke, Stuart Jones, Ted McDougall, Ross Murray
Panama	Francisco Arias, Leo Dehlinger, Anibal Galindo, Jaime de la Guardia
Peru	Guillermo Gamon, Luis Grans, Hector Lali, Alejandro Morales
Portugal	Nuno A. de Brito a Cunha, Pedro d'Hommee Caupers, Ricardo H. Soares, José Lara de Sousa e Melo
South Africa	Coen Dreyer, Johann Murray, Kevin Suddards, Neville Sundelson
South Korea	Michael Han, Kim In-bee, Huh Kwan-soo, Lee Soon-young
Spain	Eduardo de la Riva, Snr, José Gancedo, Nicasio Sagardia, Roman Taya
Sweden	Olle Dahlgren, Claes Jöhncke, Jan Rube, Mikael Sorling
Switzerland	Thomas Fortmann, Peter Gutermann, Yves Hofstetter, Martin Kessler
United States	Ben Crenshaw, Vinny Giles, Mark Hayes, Marty West
Uruguay	Franci Echeverry ferber, Victor Paullier, Pablo Paullier, Francisco Vidiella
West Germany	Freidrich C. Janssen, Jan G. Müller, Veit Pagel, Christian Strenger

== Scores ==
Place	Country	Score	To par
1st place, gold medalist(s)	United States	221-220-210-214=865	+13
2nd place, silver medalist(s)	Australia	215-219-214-222=870	+18
3rd place, bronze medalist(s)	South Africa	224-218-214-222=878	+26
4	Spain	217-220-222-220=879	+27
T5	Argentina	212-225-224-223=884	+32
T5	New Zealand	223-218-221-222=884	+32
7	Great Britain & Ireland	218-221-223-226=888	+36
8	Canada	221-218-228-222=889	+37
9	Japan	221-228-224-218=891	+39
10	France	222-227-225-229=903	+51
11	West Germany	217-227-229-232=905	+53
12	Chinese Taipei	228-226-227-226=907	+55
13	Italy	226-227-231-228=912	+60
14	Sweden	229-226-228-230=913	+61
15	Brazil	226-238-226-225=915	+63
16	Chile	241-223-228-224=916	+64
17	Netherlands	236-235-229-225=925	+73
T18	Belgium	230-230-226-241=927	+75
T18	Mexico	229-234-228-236=927	+75
T18	Portugal	235-230-235-227=927	+75
21	Switzerland	235-231-226-237=929	+77
22	Colombia	233-224-240-233=930	+78
23	Malaysia	229-233-240-236=938	+86
24	Ecuador	235-241-242-233=951	+99
25	Panama	242-237-238-235=952	+100
26	Peru	235-244-239-239=957	+105
27	Bermuda	234-242-240-247=963	+111
28	Uruguay	238-244-249-233=964	+112
29	South Korea	258-244-238-238=978	+126
30	Dominican Republic	245-253-243-244=985	+133
31	Bahamas	253-254-251-249=1007	+155
32	El Salvador	250-255-254-262=1021	+169

== Individual leaders ==
There was no official recognition for the lowest individual scores.

Place	Player	Country	Score	To par
1	Tony Gresham	Australia	70-69-73-73=285	+1
T2	Ben Crenshaw	United States	74-76-69-68=287	+3
T2	Vinny Giles	United States	72-71-71-73=287	+3
T4	Eduardo de la Riva, Sr.	Spain	72-71-72-73=288	+4
T4	Neville Sundelson	South Africa	75-72-72-69=288	+4
6	Mark Hayes	United States	74-71-71-75=291	+7
7	Roberto Monguzzi	Argentina	70-76-73-73=292	+8
8	Coen Dreyer	South Africa	77-72-70-75=294	+10
T9	Michael Bonallack	Great Britain & Ireland	71-73-75-76=295	+11
T9	Charlie Green	Great Britain & Ireland	74-73-73-75=295	+11
T9	Stuart Jones	New Zealand	74-71-76-74=295	+11
T9	Ross Murray	New Zealand	73-71-75-76=295	+11
