= Lytham Trophy =

Tournament information
- Location: Lytham St Annes, Lancashire, England
- Established: 1965
- Course: Royal Lytham & St Annes Golf Club
- Par: 70
- Length: 7,118 yards (6,509 m)
- Format: Stroke play
- Month played: May

Tournament record score
- Aggregate: 266 James Heath (2004)

Current champion
- (Finland) Lauri Rosendahl

The Lytham Trophy is an amateur golf tournament founded in 1965 by the Royal Lytham & St Annes Golf Club, where it has always been held. It is a 72-hole scratch stroke play competition, and is classified as a Category A event by the World Amateur Golf Rankings.

In 2004 James Heath set a new tournament record with an 18 under par total of 266, winning by eight strokes over Ross Fisher. His total was five strokes better than the 271 posted by Tom Lehman when he won The Open Championship in 1996, and is believed to be a record four round total over the course.

== Winners ==
Year	Winner	Country	Score
2026	Lauri Rosendahl	Finland	276
2025	Hugo Le Goff	France	285
2024	Will Hopkins	England	279
2023	Frank Kennedy	England	278
2022	John Gough	England	280
2020–2021: Cancelled
2019	Joshua McMahon	England	288
2018	Matthew Jordan	England	272
2017	Jack Singh Brar	England	288
2016	Alfie Plant	England	284
2015	Marcus Kinhult	Sweden	280
2014	Thriston Lawrence	South Africa	281
2013	Albert Eckhardt	Finland	287
2012	Daan Huizing	Netherlands	273
2011	Jack Senior	England	299
2010	Paul Cutler	Northern Ireland	284
2009	James Robinson	England	287
2008	Matt Haines	England	284
2007	Lloyd Saltman	Scotland	279
2006	Jamie Moul	England	279
2005	Gary Lockerbie	England	276
2004	James Heath	England	266
2003	Stuart Wilson	Scotland	283
2002	Lee Corfield	England	283
2001	Richard McEvoy	England	276
2000	David Dixon	England	285
1999	Tino Schuster	Germany	283
1998	Lorne Kelly	Scotland	288
1997	Graham Rankin	Scotland	279
1996	Matt Carver	Australia	284
1995	Stephen Gallacher	Scotland	281
1994	Warren Bennett	England	285
1993	Tony McLure	England	292
1992	Stuart Cage	England	294
1991	Gary Evans	England	284
1990	Gary Evans	England	291
1989	Neil Williamson	England	286
1988	Paul Broadhurst	England	291
1987	David Wood	Wales	293
1986	Steve McKenna	England	297
1985	Michael Walls	England	291
1984	John Hawksworth	England	289
1983	Stephen McAllister	Scotland	299
1982	Martin Sludds	Ireland	306
1981	Roger Chapman	England	221 (Note: Tournament reduced to 54 holes.)
1980	Ian Hutcheon	Scotland	293
1979	Peter McEvoy	England	279 (Note: Tournament reduced to 68 holes.)
1978	Brian Marchbank	Scotland	288
1977	Peter Deeble	England	296
1976	Michael Kelley	England	292
1975	George Macgregor	Scotland	299
1974	Charlie Green	Scotland	291
1973	Geoff Birtwell; Michael King	England; England	292 (tie)
1972	Michael Bonallack	England	281
1971	Warren Humphreys	England	292
1970	Geoff Birtwell; Jim Farmer; Charlie Green; Geoff Marks	England; England; Scotland; Scotland	296 (tie)
1969	Tom Craddock	Ireland	290
1968	Rodney Foster	England	286
1967	Rodney Foster	England	296
1966	Peter Townsend	England	290
1965	Michael Bonallack; Clive Clark	England; England	295 (tie)
