= 1985 Walker Cup =

Golf tournament

Coordinates: 39.792°N 74.972°W

30th Walker Cup Match
- Dates: August 21–22, 1985
- Venue: Pine Valley Golf Club
- Location: Pine Valley, New Jersey
- Captains: Jay Sigel (USA); Charlie Green (GB&I)
(United States)	13	11	(United Kingdom) (Republic of Ireland)
- United States wins the Walker Cup

The 1985 Walker Cup, the 30th Walker Cup Match, was played on August 21 and 22, 1985, at Pine Valley Golf Club, Pine Valley, New Jersey. The event was won by the United States 13 to 11.

== Format ==
The format for play on Wednesday and Thursday was the same. There were four matches of foursomes in the morning and eight singles matches in the afternoon. In all, 24 matches were played.

Each of the 24 matches was worth one point in the larger team competition. If a match was all square after the 18th hole extra holes were not played. Rather, each side earned ½ a point toward their team total. The team that accumulated at least 12½ points won the competition. If the two teams were tied, the previous winner would retain the trophy.

== Teams ==
Ten players for the United States and Great Britain & Ireland participated in the event. The United States had a playing captain, while Great Britain & Ireland had a non-playing captain.

=== United States ===
Playing captain: Jay Sigel

- Clark Burroughs
- Jerry Haas
- Bob Lewis
- Davis Love III
- Mike Podolak
- Sam Randolph
- Randy Sonnier
- Scott Verplank
- Duffy Waldorf

=== Great Britain & Ireland ===
&
Captain: (England) Charlie Green

- (England) Peter Baker
- (Scotland) Cecil Bloice
- (England) David Gilford
- (England) John Hawksworth
- (Scotland) George Macgregor
- (Wales) Paul Mayo
- (England) Peter McEvoy
- (Republic of Ireland) Garth McGimpsey
- (Scotland) Colin Montgomerie
- (Scotland) Sandy Stephen

== Wednesday's matches ==
=== Morning foursomes ===
&	Results
Montgomerie/Macgregor	(United States) 1 up	Verplank/Sigel
Hawksworth/McGimpsey	(United Kingdom) (Republic of Ireland) 4 & 3	Waldorf/Randolph
Baker/McEvoy	(United Kingdom) (Republic of Ireland) 6 & 5	Sonnier/Haas
Bloice/Stephen	halved	Podolak/Love
2½	Foursomes	1½
2½	Overall	1½

=== Afternoon singles ===
&	Results
Garth McGimpsey	(United States) 2 & 1	Scott Verplank
Paul Mayo	(United States) 5 & 4	Sam Randolph
John Hawksworth	halved	Randy Sonnier
Colin Montgomerie	(United States) 5 & 4	Jay Sigel
Peter McEvoy	(United Kingdom) (Republic of Ireland) 2 & 1	Bob Lewis
George Macgregor	(United Kingdom) (Republic of Ireland) 2 up	Clark Burroughs
David Gilford	(United States) 4 & 2	Duffy Waldorf
Sandy Stephen	(United Kingdom) (Republic of Ireland) 2 & 1	Jerry Haas
3½	Singles	4½
6	Overall	6

== Thursday's matches ==
=== Morning foursomes ===
&	Results
Montgomerie/Mayo	halved	Verplank/Siegel
Hawksworth/McGimpsey	(United States) 3 & 2	Randolph/Haas
Baker/McEvoy	(United States) 2 & 1	Lewis/Burroughs
Bloice/Stephen	(United States) 3 & 2	Podolak/Love
½	Foursomes	3½
6½	Overall	9½

=== Afternoon singles ===
&	Results
Garth McGimpsey	halved	Sam Randolph
Colin Montgomerie	(United States) 1 up	Scott Verplank
John Hawksworth	(United Kingdom) (Republic of Ireland) 4 & 3	Jay Sigel
Peter McEvoy	(United States) 5 & 3	Davis Love III
Peter Baker	(United Kingdom) (Republic of Ireland) 5 & 4	Randy Sonnier
George Macgregor	(United Kingdom) (Republic of Ireland) 3 & 2	Clark Burroughs
Cecil Bloice	(United States) 4 & 2	Bob Lewis
Sandy Stephen	(United Kingdom) (Republic of Ireland) 2 & 1	Duffy Waldorf
4½	Singles	3½
11	Overall	13
