= Charlie Green (golfer) =

Scottish golfer (1932–2013)

Personal information
- Full name: Charles Wilson Green
- Nationality: Scotland
- Born: 2 August 1932 Dumbarton, Scotland
- Died: 28 January 2013 (aged 80) Cardross, Scotland

Career
- Sport: Golf
- Status: Amateur

Best results in major championships
- Masters Tournament: DNP
- PGA Championship: DNP
- U.S. Open: DNP
- The Open Championship: T37: 1962

Charles Wilson Green (2 August 1932 – 28 January 2013) was a Scottish amateur golfer. He was one of the leading British amateurs of his generation.

== Amateur career ==
As an individual, he won the Scottish Amateur three times, the Scottish Amateur Stroke Play Champion twice and the Lytham Trophy twice. He represented Great Britain and Ireland in five Walker Cup matches and twice in the Eisenhower Trophy. At the 1972 Eisenhower Trophy in Buenos Aires, Argentina, Green finished tied 9th individually and tied best in his team.

In 1962 at Troon Golf Club, Scotland, he won the Silver Medal as the leading amateur in the Open Championship.

At 58 years of age, Green finished fourth and leading amateur at the 1991 Seniors' British Open at Royal Lytham & St Annes Golf Club, England, four shots from winner Bobby Verwey, but three shots ahead of defending champion Gary Player on tied fifth. This marked the best finish ever by an amateur in the championship and, as of 2023, still is. Also at the 1989 Seniors' British Open at Turnberry Golf Resort, Scotland, Green were, tied with Gordon Clark, leading amateur.

== Amateur wins ==
- 1959 Eden Tournament
- 1960 Dunbartonshire Amateur
- 1962 West of Scotland Amateur
- 1965 Dunbartonshire Match-play
- 1967 Dunbartonshire Amateur, Dunbartonshire Match-play
- 1968 Tennant Cup, Edward Trophy, Dunbartonshire Amateur
- 1969 Dunbartonshire Match-play
- 1970 Scottish Amateur, Lytham Trophy, Tennant Cup, West of Scotland Amateur
- 1971 Dunbartonshire Match-play
- 1973 Edward Trophy, Dunbartonshire Amateur
- 1974 Lytham Trophy (tied with Geoff Birtwell, Jim Farmer and Geoff Marks), Edward Trophy, Dunbartonshire Match-play
- 1975 Scottish Amateur Stroke Play Championship, Edward Trophy, Tennant Cup
- 1977 Dunbartonshire Amateur
- 1979 West of Scotland Amateur, Glasgow Amateur
- 1982 Scottish Amateur
- 1983 Scottish Amateur
- 1984 Scottish Amateur Stroke Play Championship
- 1988 British Senior Amateur Championship
- 1989 British Senior Amateur Championship
- 1990 British Senior Amateur Championship
- 1991 British Senior Amateur Championship, Scottish Senior Amateur Championship

== Team appearances ==
- Home Internationals (representing Scotland): 1961 (winners), 1962 (winners, tied), 1963 (winners (tied), 1964, 1965, 1967 (winners), 1968, 1969, 1970 (winners), 1971 (winners), 1972 (winners, tied), 1973, 1974, 1975 (winners), 1976 (winners), 1978, 1980
- Walker Cup (representing Great Britain & Ireland): 1963, 1969, 1971 (winners), 1973, 1975, 1983 (non-playing captain), 1985 (non-playing captain)
- Eisenhower Trophy (representing Great Britain & Ireland): 1970, 1972, 1984 (non-playing captain), 1986 (non-playing captain)
- St Andrews Trophy (representing Great Britain & Ireland): 1962 (winners), 1966 (winners), 1968 (winners), 1970 (winners), 1972 (winners), 1974, 1976 (winners)
- Commonwealth Tournament (representing Great Britain): 1971
- European Amateur Team Championship (representing Scotland): 1965, 1967, 1969, 1971, 1973, 1975 (winners), 1977 (winners), 1979
