= Torsten Jöhncke =

Swedish ice hockey player

Personal information
- Nationality: Swedish
- Born: 14 March 1912 Stockholm, Sweden
- Died: 8 November 1984 (aged 72) Stockholm, Sweden

Sport
- Sport: Ice hockey

Torsten Jöhncke (14 March 1912 – 8 November 1984) was a Swedish ice hockey player. He competed in the men's tournament at the 1936 Winter Olympics.
