= European Amateur Team Championship =

European amateur team golf championship

Tournament information
- Established: 1959
- Course: Various courses in Europe
- Organized by: European Golf Association
- Format: Team match play

Current champion
- Ireland (2026)

The European Amateur Team Championship is a European amateur team golf championship for men organised by the European Golf Association which was introduced in 1959.

The championship was played in odd-numbered years from 1959 to 2007 and has been played annually since 2008 (with the exception of 2012).

== Format ==
=== 1959–1965 ===
Each team consisted of a minimum of six players, playing two rounds of stroke play, counting the four best scores for each team. The four best teams formed flight A, were the winner was determined by a round-robin system. All teams in the flight met each other and the team with most points for team matches won the tournament, using the scale, won 2 points, halved 1 point, lost 0 points.

=== 1967–1975 ===
Each team played one round of stroke play, counted the five best scores for each team. The eight best teams formed flight A, in knock-out match play over the next three days, teams being seeded based on their position after the stroke play.

=== 1977–2019 ===
Each team consisted of 6 players, playing two rounds of stroke play over two days, counting the five best scores for each team, and two foursomes and five single matches in the following knock-out play.

From 2013, the number of participating teams was limited to 16. A second division, named European Men's Challenge Trophy, was introduced, giving the participating teams the opportunity to qualify for next year's championship, by finishing top three, replacing the three last finishing teams in the first division. The year after, the Challenge Trophy was renamed The European Amateur Team Championship Division 2.

=== 2020 ===
In 2020 only 14 team participated, each of four players. All competitors play a round of stroke play on the first day. The team score is based on the leading three scores of each team. After the first day, the leading eight teams compete in Flight A in knock-out match play over the next three days, teams being seeded based on their position after the stroke play. Contests consist of one foursome in the morning and two singles in the afternoon. If a match is level after 18 holes, extra holes are played to get a result, although if the overall result has already been determined later matches that are level after 18 holes are halved. The remaining teams, not qualified for Flight A, competed in a similar bracket in Flight B, to determine the final standings.

=== 2021–present ===
Currently the championship is contested by up to 16 teams, each of 6 players.

The format consists of two rounds of stroke play, out of which the five lowest scores from each team's six players will count each day. The total addition of the five lowest scores will constitute the team's score and determine the teams qualified for the last three rounds of match play. Only teams in contention for a medal will play a match format of two foursomes and five singles, while the other teams will play a one foursome and four singles match format.

The top 13 teams qualify for next year's championship along with next year's hosting nation, if not among the top 13. The next year's field is filled with the top two, or three if host nation is already qualified, from last year's Division II.

== Results ==
Year	Venue	Location	Winner	Score	Runner-up
2026	Estonian G&CC	Estonia	Ireland	4–3	Estonia
2025	Killarney Golf & Fishing Club	Ireland	Italy	6 1/2–1/2	Denmark
2024	Royal Park I Roveri	Italy	Sweden	3–2	Netherlands
2023	Royal Waterloo Golf Club	Belgium	Spain	4–3	Denmark
2022	Royal St George's Golf Club	England	Spain	4 1/2–2 1/2	Sweden
2021	PGA Catalunya	Spain	Denmark	5 1/2–1 1/2	France
2020	Hilversumsche GC	Netherlands	Germany	2–1	Sweden
2019	Ljunghusen GC	Sweden	Sweden	4 1/2–2 1/2	England
2018	Bad Saarow Golf Club (Faldo Course)	Germany	Finland	5–2	England
2017	Diamond G&CC	Austria	Spain	4–3	England
2016	Golf de Chantilly, Paris	France	Scotland	5–2	Sweden
2015	Halmstad GC (North Course)	Sweden	Scotland	4 1/2–2 1/2	Denmark
2014	Linna Golf	Finland	Spain	5–2	Ireland
2013	Silkeborg Ry GC	Denmark	England	4 1/2–2 1/2	Scotland
2011	Oceânico Golf (Victoria Course), Vilamoura	Portugal	France	4 1/2–2 1/2	Switzerland
2010	Österåker GC (Västerled course)	Sweden	England	4 1/2–2 1/2	Sweden
2009	Conwy GC	Wales	Scotland	5–2	England
2008	Royal Park G&CC, Turin	Italy	Ireland	4 1/2–2 1/2	England
2007	Western Gailes GC	Scotland	Ireland	4 1/2–2 1/2	France
2005	Hillside GC, Southport	England	England	6–1	Germany
2003	Royal the Hague G&CC	Netherlands	Spain	5–2	England
2001	Ljunghusen GC	Sweden	Scotland	5–2	Ireland
1999	Monticello GC	Italy	Italy	4–3	Germany
1997	Portmarnock GC	Ireland	Spain	4 1/2–2 1/2	Scotland
1995	Royal Antwerp GC	Belgium	Scotland	6–1	England
1993	Royal GC Mariánské Lázne	Czech Republic	Wales	4–3	England
1991	Real Club de la Puerta de Hierro	Spain	England	5–2	Italy
1989	Royal Porthcawl GC	Wales	England	5–2	Scotland
1987	Murhof G&CC	Austria	Ireland	4 1/2–2 1/2	England
1985	Halmstad GC (North Course)	Sweden	Scotland	4 1/2–2 1/2	Sweden
1983	Golf de Chantilly, Paris	France	Ireland	5–2	Spain
1981	Old Course at St Andrews	Scotland	England	4–3	Scotland
1979	Esbjerg GC	Denmark	England	5 1/2–1 1/2	Wales
1977	Royal the Hague G&CC	Netherlands	Scotland	5–2	Sweden
1975	Killarney G&FC	Ireland	Scotland	4 1/2–2 1/2	Italy
1973	Penina Golf and Resort	Portugal	England	4–3	Scotland
1971	Golf Club de Lausanne	Switzerland	England	5–2	Scotland
1969	Hamburger GC – Falkenstein, Hamburg	Germany	England	4 1/2–2 1/2	Germany
1967	Torino GC – La Mandria, Turin	Italy	Ireland	4–3	France
1965	Royal St George's GC, Sandwich	England	Ireland	4 points	Scotland
1963	Falsterbo GC	Sweden	England	6 points	Sweden
1961	Royal GC de Belgique, Brussels	Belgium	Sweden	5 points	England
1959	El Prat GC, Barcelona	Spain	Sweden	5 points	France

== Winning nations' summary ==
Country	Winner	Runner-up
England	11	10
Scotland	8	7
Ireland	7	2
Spain	6	1
Sweden	4	7
Italy	2	2
France	1	4
Denmark	1	3
Germany	1	3
Wales	1	1
Finland	1	0
Estonia	0	1
Netherlands	0	1
Switzerland	0	1
Total	43	43

== Winning teams ==
- 2026: Ireland: John Doyle, Stuart Grehan, Thomas Higgins, Matthew McClean, Caolan Rafferty, Gavin Tiernan
- 2025: Italy: Giovanni Binaghi, Riccardo Fantinelli, Michele Ferrero, Biagio Gagliardi, Julien Paltrinieri, Filippo Ponzano
- 2024: Sweden: Simon Hovdal, Albert Hansson, Algot Kleen, Jakob Melin, Daniel Svärd, Lucas Augustsson
- 2023: Spain: Ángel Ayora, José Luis Ballester, Javier Barcos, Luis Masaveu, Jaime Montojo, Joseba Torres
- 2022: Spain: David Puig, José Luis Ballester, Luis Masaveu, Quim Vidal, Javier Barcos, Alejandro Aguilera
- 2021: Denmark: Christoffer Bring, Hamish Brown, Sebastian Friedrichsen, August Thor Høst, Frederik Kjettrup, Søren Broholt Lind
- 2020: Germany: Nick Bachem, Jannik de Bruyn, Marc Hammer, Matti Schmid
- 2019: Sweden: Ludvig Åberg, Albin Bergström, Vincent Norrman, David Nyfjäll, Pontus Nyholm, Christoffer Pålsson
- 2018: Finland: Matias Honkala, Jonatan Jolkkonen, Santeri Lehesmaa, Veeti Mähönen, Aleksi Myllymäki, Sami Välimäki
- 2017: Spain: Adri Arnaus, Alejandro del Rey, Manuel Elvira, Ángel Hidalgo, Victor Pastor, Javier Sainz
- 2016: Scotland: Grant Forrest, Craig Howie, Robert MacIntyre, Jamie Savage, Sandy Scott, Connor Syme
- 2015: Scotland: Ewen Ferguson, Grant Forrest, Greig Marchbank, Jack McDonald, Graeme Robertson, Connor Syme
- 2014: Spain: Pep Anglès, Daniel Berná, Emilio Cuartero, Mario Galiano, Scott Fernández, Jon Rahm
- 2013: England: Nathan Kimsey, Max Orrin, Garrick Porteous, Neil Raymond, Callum Shinkwin, Toby Tree
- 2011: France: Cyril Bouniol, Julien Brun, Édouard España, Sébastien Gros, Alexander Lévy, Gary Stal
- 2010: England: Laurie Canter, Tommy Fleetwood, Billy Hemstock, Tom Lewis, Chris Paisley, Eddie Pepperell
- 2009: Scotland: Wallace Booth, Glenn Campbell, Gavin Dear, Ross Kellett, Paul O'Hara, Michael Stewart
- 2008: Ireland: Jonathan Caldwell, Paul Cutler, Niall Kearney, Shane Lowry, Paul O'Hanlon, Gareth Shaw
- 2007: Ireland: Jonathan Caldwell, Shane Lowry, Richard Kilpatrick, Rory McIlroy, Gareth Shaw, Simon Ward
- 2005: England: Oliver Fisher, Gary Lockerbie, Jamie Moul, Matthew Richardson, Steven Tiley, Gary Wolstenholme
- 2003: Spain: Alejandro Cañizares, Gonzalo Fernández-Castaño, Sebastián García Grout, Alfredo García-Heredia, Pablo Martín, Álvaro Quirós
- 2001: Scotland: Craig Heap, Barry Hume, Simon Mackenzie, Steven O'Hara, Marc Warren, Craig Watson
- 1999: Italy: Joachim Hassan, Roberto Paolillo, Stefano Reale, Michele Rigone, Massimiliano Secci, Andrea Zanini
- 1997: Spain: Juan Carlos Agüero, Sergio García, José Manuel Lara, Raúl Quirós, Oscar Sanchez, Juan Vizcaya
- 1995: Scotland: Stephen Gallacher, Barclay Howard, Hugh McKibbin, Graham Rankin, Alan Reid, Gordon Sherry
- 1993: Wales: Richard Dinsdale, Bradley Dredge, Craig Evans, Richard Johnson, Michael Macara, Calvin O'Carroll
- 1991: England: Gary Evans, Ian Garbutt, Jim Payne, Andrew Sandywell, Ricky Willison, Liam White
- 1989: England: Russell Claydon, Andrew Hare, Peter McEvoy, Carl Suneson, Darren Prosser, Ricky Willison
- 1987: Ireland: Neil Anderson, Pádraig Hogan, Garth McGimpsey, John McHenry, Liam McNamara, Eoghan O'Connell
- 1985: Scotland: Cecil Bloice, Ian Brotherston, George Macgregor, Angus Moir, Colin Montgomerie, Sandy Stephen
- 1983: Ireland: John Carr, Tom Cleary, Garth McGimpsey, Mick Morris, Arthur Pierce, Philip Walton
- 1981: England: Roger Chapman, Peter Deeble, Paul Downes, Geoffrey Godwin, Peter McEvoy, Paul Way
- 1979: England: Ian Bradshaw, Peter Deeble, Paul Downes, Geoffrey Godwin, Michael Kelley, Peter McEvoy
- 1977: Scotland: Allan Brodie, Iain Carslaw, Charlie Green, Ian Hutcheon, Steve Martin, Gordon Murray
- 1975: Scotland: Charlie Green, Ian Hutcheon, George Macgregor, Gordon Murray, Sandy Stephen, Hugh Stuart
- 1973: England: John Davies, Rodney Foster, Peter Hedges, Trevor Homer, Michael King, Roger Revell
- 1971: England: Michael Bonallack, Rodney Foster, Warren Humphreys, Michael King, Geoff Marks, David Marsh
- 1969: England: Peter Benka, Michael Bonallack, Bruce Critchley, Rodney Foster, Geoff Marks, Peter Tupling
- 1967: Ireland: Joe Carr, Tom Craddock, Tom Egan, Peter Flaherty, Vincent Nevin, David Sheahan
- 1965: Ireland Joe Carr, Tom Craddock, Michael Craigan, Bill McCrea, Vincent Nevin, David Sheahan, Rupert Staunton
- 1963: England: Michael Bonallack, Michael Burgess, Rodney Foster, Peter Green, David Moffat, David Palmer, Alan Thirlwell
- 1961: Sweden: Johny Anderson, Gustaf Adolf Bielke, Ola Bergqvist, Gunnar Carlander, Lennart Leinborn, Magnus Lindberg, Bengt Möller
- 1959: Sweden: Ola Bergqvist, Gustaf Adolf Bielke, Gunnar Carlander, Per-Olof Johansson, Göran Lindeblad, Bengt Möller, Nils Odqvist (captain who played as stand in for players who were ill), Elis Werkell

== See also ==
- Eisenhower Trophy – biennial world amateur team golf championship for men organized by the International Golf Federation.
- European Amateur Championship – European amateur individual golf championship for men organised by the European Golf Association.
- European Ladies' Team Championship – European amateur team golf championship for women organised by the European Golf Association.
