= Rodney Foster =

English golfer (born 1941)

Personal information
- Nationality: England
- Born: 13 October 1941 (age 85) Shipley, West Yorkshire, England

Career
- Sport: Golf
- Status: Amateur

Best results in major championships
- Masters Tournament: CUT: 1966
- PGA Championship: DNP
- U.S. Open: DNP
- The Open Championship: CUT: 1962, 1965, 1969, 1972, 1973

Rodney Foster (born 13 October 1941) is an English amateur golfer. He was one of the leading British amateurs of the 1960s and early 1970s. He represented Great Britain and Ireland in five successive Walker Cup matches from 1965 to 1973 and twice in the Eisenhower Trophy, in 1964 and 1970.

Foster was relatively unknown when he won the 1964 Berkshire Trophy with a score of 281, two ahead of Michael Attenborough. He was also runner-up in the English Amateur the same year, losing by 1 hole in the 36-hole final to David Marsh. His good performances gained him a place in the four-man Great Britain and Ireland team for the 1964 Eisenhower Trophy. The team led throughout and finished two strokes ahead of Canada.

== Amateur wins ==
- 1964 Berkshire Trophy
- 1967 Lytham Trophy
- 1968 Lytham Trophy
- 1969 Brabazon Trophy (tie with Michael Bonallack)
- 1970 Brabazon Trophy

== Team appearances ==
- Walker Cup (representing Great Britain & Ireland): 1965 (tied), 1967, 1969, 1971 (winners), 1973, 1979 (non-playing captain), 1981 (non-playing captain)
- Eisenhower Trophy (representing Great Britain & Ireland): 1964 (winners), 1970
- St Andrews Trophy (representing Great Britain & Ireland): 1964 (winners), 1966 (winners), 1968 (winners), 1970 (winners)
- Commonwealth Tournament (representing Great Britain): 1967 (joint winners), 1971
- European Amateur Team Championship (representing England): 1963 (winners), 1965, 1967, 1969 (winners), 1971 (winners), 1973 (winners)
