= Michael Bonallack =

English amateur golfer and administrator (1934–2023)

Sir Michael Bonallack OBE
Personal information
- Full name: Michael Francis Bonallack
- Nationality: England
- Born: 31 December 1934 Chigwell, Essex, England
- Died: 26 September 2023 (aged 88) St Andrews, Fife, Scotland

Career
- Sport: Golf
- Status: Amateur

Best results in major championships
- Masters Tournament: CUT: 1966, 1969, 1970
- The Open Championship: T11: 1959
- U.S. Amateur: R64: 1961
- British Amateur: Won: 1961, 1965, 1968, 1969, 1970

Achievements and awards
- World Golf Hall of Fame: 2000 (member page)
- Knight Bachelor: 1998
- Bob Jones Award: 1972
- (For a full list of awards, see here)

Sir Michael Francis Bonallack, OBE (31 December 1934 – 26 September 2023) was an English amateur golfer who was one of the leading administrators in world golf in the late 20th century.

== Early life ==
Bonallack was born in Chigwell, Essex. He learned the game of golf under the tutelage of head professional Bert Hodson at Chigwell and soon won the Boys Amateur Championship in 1952.

== Golf career ==
A rare example of an outstanding golfer who remained an amateur in the era when professional domination of the sport became firmly entrenched, he went on to win the Amateur Championship and the English Amateur five times each and the Brabazon Trophy four times. He was a member of nine Walker Cup teams and played in the Eisenhower Trophy seven times. His best finish at the Open Championship was eleventh in 1959. He was the leading amateur at the Open in 1968 and 1971.

== Affiliations ==
Bonallack was Secretary of The Royal and Ancient Golf Club of St Andrews from 1983 to 1999 and Captain from 1999 to 2000. He has also been President of the Golf Club Managers' Association (1974–84), Chairman of the PGA of Great Britain and Ireland (1976–81), Chairman of the Golf Foundation (1977–82), and President of the English Golf Union (1982).

Bonallack was the president of the British and International Golf Greenkeepers Association (BIGGA) and also served as president of the One Armed Golfers Society, the Professional Golfers Association of Europe and as chairman of the advisory committee for the Official World Golf Rankings. He was also president of the National Association of Public and Proprietary Golf Courses (NAPGC).

== Awards, honours, and achievements ==
- 1968 British Association of Golf Writers award
- Bonallack was appointed an Officer of the Order of the British Empire (OBE) for services to golf in the 1971 New Year Honours
- Bonallack was knighted in the 1998 Birthday Honours, again for services to golf
- In 1972, he was voted the Bob Jones Award, the highest honour given by the United States Golf Association in recognition of distinguished sportsmanship in golf
- He was a member of Augusta National Golf Club
- 1991 American Society of Golf Course Architects Donald Ross award
- 1999 Spanish Golf Federation Golf Medal of Honour
- 2000 Czech Republic Golf Shield of Honour
- 2000 Metropolitan Golf Association Lifetime Service Award
- He received numerous honours from golfing organisations around the world culminating in his induction into the World Golf Hall of Fame in 2000

== Legacy ==
Europe and the Asia-Pacific play for the Sir Michael Bonallack Trophy every two years. The teams consist of 12 amateur golfers and no more than two players can be from the same country.

== Personal life and death ==
Bonallack married Angela Ward in February 1958. They were married for 64 years until her death in July 2022.

Bonallack died in St Andrews, Fife on 26 September 2023, at the age of 88.

== Tournament wins ==
Note: This list may be incomplete

- 1952 Boys Amateur Championship
- 1954 Essex Amateur Championship
- 1955 Army Championship
- 1957 Berkshire Trophy, Essex Amateur Championship, Hampshire Hog
- 1958 Worplesdon Mixed Foursomes (with Angela Bonallack)
- 1959 Sunningdale Foursomes (with Doug Sewell), Essex Amateur Championship
- 1960 Essex Amateur Championship
- 1961 The Amateur Championship, Berkshire Trophy, Golf Illustrated Gold Vase (tie with David Harrison), Essex Amateur Championship, Scrutton Jug
- 1962 English Amateur
- 1963 English Amateur, Essex Amateur Championship
- 1964 Brabazon Trophy, Essex Amateur Championship, Scrutton Jug, Antlers of Royal Mid-Surrey (with D. Marsh)
- 1965 The Amateur Championship, English Amateur, Lytham Trophy (tie with Clive Clark), Berkshire Trophy, Royal St. George's Grand Challenge Cup
- 1966 Scrutton Jug
- 1967 English Amateur, Golf Illustrated Gold Vase (tie with Bob Durrant lost playoff for Gold Medal), Prince of Wales Challenge Cup
- 1968 The Amateur Championship, English Amateur, Brabazon Trophy, Berkshire Trophy, Golf Illustrated Gold Vase, Essex Amateur Championship, Royal St. George's Grand Challenge Cup, Scrutton Jug
- 1969 The Amateur Championship, Brabazon Trophy (tie with Rodney Foster), Golf Illustrated Gold Vase, Essex Amateur Championship, Essex Open, Scrutton Jug
- 1970 The Amateur Championship, Berkshire Trophy, Essex Amateur Championship, Scrutton Jug
- 1971 Brabazon Trophy, Berkshire Trophy (tie with John Davies), Golf Illustrated Gold Vase, Scrutton Jug
- 1972 Lytham Trophy, Essex Amateur Championship
- 1973 East Anglian Open
- 1975 Golf Illustrated Gold Vase
- 1981 Royal St. George's Grand Challenge Cup

== Results in major championships ==
Tournament	1956	1957	1958	1959
Masters Tournament				
The Open Championship				T11
U.S. Amateur		R128		
The Amateur Championship	R128	R32	SF	R32

Tournament	1960	1961	1962	1963	1964	1965	1966	1967	1968	1969
Masters Tournament							CUT			CUT
The Open Championship		CUT		CUT	CUT	T33	T27	CUT	T21LA	T42
U.S. Amateur		R64				T53			T11	T14
The Amateur Championship	QF	1	–	–	–	1	–	–	1	1

Tournament	1970	1971	1972	1973
Masters Tournament	CUT			
The Open Championship	CUT	T22LA	CUT	CUT
U.S. Amateur				R32
The Amateur Championship	1	–	–	–

Note: Bonallack did not play in the U.S. Open or the PGA Championship.

Did not play

LA = Low amateur
CUT = missed the half-way cut (3rd round cut in 1970 Open Championship)
"T" indicates a tie for a place
R256, R128, R64, R32, R16, QF, SF = Round in which player lost in match play
Green background for wins. Yellow background for top-10

Sources: , Masters, U.S. Open and U.S. Amateur, Open Championship, Amateur Championship (1956, 1957, 1958, 1959, 1960

== Team appearances ==
this list may be incomplete

- Eisenhower Trophy (representing Great Britain and Ireland): 1960, 1962, 1964 (winners), 1966, 1968 (individual leader, tie), 1970, 1972
- Walker Cup (representing Great Britain and Ireland): 1957, 1959, 1961, 1963, 1965 (tied), 1967, 1969 (playing captain), 1971 (winners, playing captain), 1973
- Amateurs–Professionals Match (representing the Amateurs): 1957, 1958 (winners), 1959, 1960
- St Andrews Trophy (representing Great Britain and Ireland): 1958 (winners), 1960 (winners), 1962 (winners), 1964 (winners), 1966 (winners), 1968 (winners), 1970 (winners), 1972 (winners)
- Commonwealth Tournament (representing Great Britain): 1959, 1963 (joint winners), 1967 (joint winners), 1971
- European Amateur Team Championship (representing England): 1963 (winners), 1965, 1969 (winners), 1971 (winners)
