= Penina Hotel & Golf Resort =

Portuguese golf resort

Penina Golf and Resort
- Interactive map of Penina Golf and Resort
- 37.1608°N 8.5804°W

Club information
- Location: Alvor, Portugal
- Established: 1966
- Type: Private
- Operator: JJW Hotels & Resorts
- Tota holes: 36
- Tournaments: Portuguese Open
- Website: https://penina.com/

Henry Cotton Championship Course
- Designed by: Henry Cotton
- Par: 73
- Length: 6,273 metres

Resort Course
- Par: 35
- Length: 2,987 metres

Academy Course
- Par: 30
- Length: 1,851 metres

Penina Hotel & Golf Resort is a golf resort in Alvor in the Algarve region of southern Portugal. The resort spans 360 acres (1.5 km^{2}) and contains a hotel complex, golf courses, tennis courts, a football pitch, and a running track. It is owned and operated by JJW Hotels & Resorts.

== History ==
In 1966, it was the first course to be built in the Algarve. The resort's 18-hole Championship Course, founded by John Stilwell and designed by Sir Henry Cotton was originally called The Penina and has been the venue for the Portuguese Open on many occasions, most recently in 2006. There are also two 9-hole courses, the Resort Course and the Academy Course but the latter has been closed for a number of years and has fallen into a state of disrepair.

== Championship Course ==
=== Score Card ===
Hole	Par	Whites Length	Yellows Length	Reds Length
1	4	407 mt / 445 yd	391 mt / 428 yd	362 mt / 396 yd
2	4	388 mt / 424 yd	368 mt / 402 yd	326 mt / 357 yd
3	4	306 mt / 335 yd	294 mt / 322 yd	233 mt / 255 yd
4	4	353 mt / 386 yd	332 mt / 363 yd	282 mt / 308 yd
5	5	451 mt / 493 yd	418 mt / 457 yd	387 mt / 423 yd
6	3	176 mt / 192 yd	158 mt / 173 yd	128 mt / 140 yd
7	4	310 mt / 339 yd	269 mt / 294 yd	235 mt / 257 yd
8	3	171 mt / 187 yd	155 mt / 170 yd	115 mt / 126 yd
9	4	386 mt / 422 yd	349 mt / 382 yd	297 mt / 325 yd
Out	35	2,948 mt / 3,223 yd	2,734 mt / 2,990 yd	2,365 mt / 2,587 yd
10	5	498 mt / 545 yd	485 mt / 530 yd	425 mt / 465 yd
11	5	494 mt / 540 yd	439 mt / 480 yd	407 mt / 445 yd
12	4	385 mt / 421 yd	358 mt / 392 yd	331 mt / 362 yd
13	3	185 mt / 202 yd	165 mt / 180 yd	148 mt / 162 yd
14	4	358 mt / 392 yd	337 mt / 369 yd	286 mt / 313 yd
15	4	301 mt / 329 yd	281 mt / 307 yd	261 mt / 285 yd
16	3	192 mt / 210 yd	156 mt / 171 yd	128 mt / 140 yd
17	5	476 mt / 521 yd	454 mt / 496 yd	403 mt / 441 yd
18	5	436 mt / 477 yd	418 mt / 457 yd	386 mt / 422 yd
In	38	3,325 mt / 3,637 yd	3,093 mt / 3,383 yd	2,775 mt / 3,035 yd
Total	73	6,273 mt / 6,860 yd	5,827 mt / 6,373 yd	5,140 mt / 5,622 yd

== See also ==
- List of golf courses in Portugal
