= International Golf Federation =

International golf governing body

- Sport: Golf
- Category: International sport federation
- Jurisdiction: International
- Membership: 154 National Federation members 21 Professional members
- Abbreviation: IGF
- Founded: 2 May 1958; 68 years ago
- Affiliation: International Olympic Committee
- Headquarters: Lausanne, Switzerland
- President: Annika Sörenstam
- Vice president: Ty Votaw

Official website
- www.igfgolf.org

The International Golf Federation (IGF) was founded on 2 May 1958 and is the international federation recognized by the International Olympic Committee as the world governing body for golf.

The IGF has two membership categories representing the administration of golf internationally:

- 154 National Federation Members from 151 countries
- 21 Professional Members, mostly professional golf tours and Professional Golfers Associations

== History ==
Responding to numerous international match requests, in January 1958 the USGA suggested establishing a worldwide team golf competition. Representatives from the USGA and The R&A met that March to officially designate St. Andrews, Scotland, as the host venue for the premier men's World Team Championship.

On 2 May 1958, the first documented step was marked toward the formal creation of the World Amateur Golf Council, as delegates from 35 nations convened in Washington, D.C. for a meeting co-organized by the USGA and The R&A. The Council was established by 32 member organizations and its purpose was to oversee the arrangement and management of the Men's World Amateur Team Championships. In October of that year, St Andrews hosted the inaugural championship, with the men's prize, the Eisenhower Trophy, being named after the golf enthusiast U.S. President, Dwight D. Eisenhower.

Beginning in 1966, the World Amateur Golf Council also became the organizer for all future Women's World Amateur Team Championships, after France hosted the first Women’s World Amateur Team Championship event at the St. Germain Golf Club, near Paris, in October 1964, awarding the Espirito Santo Trophy.

The Federation changed its name from the World Amateur Golf Council to the International Golf Federation in 2003 to reflect its transition to governing all of golf.

In 2009, following the 13th Olympic Congress, the IOC voted to reintroduce golf at the 2016 Summer Olympics in Rio de Janeiro, under the sanction of the International Golf Federation with individual events for men and women. Two years prior, the sport had already joined the programme of the Youth Summer Olympics, at Nanjing 2014.

== Secretariat ==
The headquarters of the IGF is located by the shores of Lake Geneva in Lausanne, Switzerland.

== Jurisdiction ==
Unlike most internationally recognized sports federations, the IGF is not responsible for developing, maintaining or administering the rules of golf. Instead, the rules are jointly developed and administered by the United States Golf Association (for the United States and Mexico only) and The R&A (the governing body derived from The Royal and Ancient Golf Club of St Andrews, the historical codifier of the rules of golf), the two oldest governing bodies in golf history.

== Events ==
=== Olympic Games ===
The globalization of the sport has meant that following a couple of failed attempts, the International Olympic Committee's executive board approved the reinstatement of golf in the Olympics by a vote of 63 votes to 27 in 2009. The sport debuted as a core sport in the 2016 Summer Olympics and will be included in all subsequent games as so. It was also featured at the early Olympics in 1900 and 1904.

=== World Amateur Golf Team Championships ===
The World Amateur Golf Team Championships was started from 1958 for men and 1964 for women.

==== Men ====
The Eisenhower Trophy is a biennial world team championship for amateur men golfers. First held in 1958, the event is named after Dwight D. Eisenhower who was the President of the United States at the time.

==== Women ====
The Espirito Santo Trophy is a biennial world team championship for amateur women golfers. It was first held in 1964, organised by Mrs. Henri Prunaret and Lally Segard, and named after Ricardo and Silvia Espirito Santo, friends of Segard who donated the trophy.

== Category ==
=== National Federations ===
IGF comprises 132 federations from 126 countries

=== Continental / Regional Federations ===
The following seven regional association are formed with the IGF National Membership.

- Africa Golf Confederation
- Americas Golf Association
- Arab Golf Federation
- Asia-Pacific Golf Confederation
- Caribbean Golf Association
- European Golf Association
- South American Golf Federation

== See also ==
- SportAccord
