= 2011 BMW PGA Championship =

Tournament information
- Dates: 26–29 May 2011
- Location: Virginia Water, Surrey, England; 51.40°N 0.59°W
- Courses: Wentworth Club; West Course
- Tour: European Tour

Statistics
- Par: 71
- Length: 7,251 yards (6,630 m)
- Field: 150 players, 66 after cut
- Cut: 146 (+4)
- Prize fund: €4,500,000
- Winner's share: €750,000

Champion
- (England) Luke Donald
- 278 (−6)

Location map
- Location in England Location in Surrey

The 2011 BMW PGA Championship was the 57th edition of the BMW PGA Championship, an annual professional golf tournament on the European Tour. It was held 26–29 May at the West Course of Wentworth Club in Virginia Water, Surrey, England, a suburb southwest of London.

Englishman Luke Donald beat Lee Westwood in a sudden-death playoff and overtook his countryman as the new World Number One.

== Course layout ==
Wentworth Club, West Course
Tee	Rating/Slope	1	2	3	4	5	6	7	8	9	Out	10	11	12	13	14	15	16	17	18	In	Total
Yardage	n/a	473	154	465	552	203	418	396	391	449	3,501	184	416	480	470	179	489	383	610	539	3,750	7,251
Par		4	3	4	5	3	4	4	4	4	35	3	4	4	4	3	4	4	5	5	36	71

== Round summaries ==
=== First round ===
Thursday, 26 May 2011

Place	Player	Score	To par
1	(England) Luke Donald	64	−7
T2	(Sweden) Johan Edfors	66	−5
T2	(Italy) Matteo Manassero	66	−5
4	(Sweden) Oscar Florén	67	−4
T5	(England) Ian Poulter	68	−3
T5	(Spain) José Manuel Lara	68	−3
T5	(Wales) Bradley Dredge	68	−3
T5	(England) Ross McGowan	68	−3
T9	(Northern Ireland) Darren Clarke	69	−2
T9	(England) Kenneth Ferrie	69	−2
T9	(Denmark) Anders Hansen	69	−2
T9	(France) Thomas Levet	69	−2
T9	(Scotland) Colin Montgomerie	69	−2
T9	(Spain) Álvaro Quirós	69	−2

=== Second round ===
Friday, 27 May 2011

Place	Player	Score	To par
T1	(Spain) Álvaro Quirós	69-67=136	−6
T1	(Italy) Matteo Manassero	66-70=136	−6
T1	(England) Luke Donald	64-72=136	−6
T4	(South Africa) Thomas Aiken	71-67=138	−4
T4	(England) David Horsey	70-68=138	−4
T4	(Spain) José Manuel Lara	68-70=138	−4
7	(England) Simon Dyson	71-68=139	−3
T8	(Scotland) Scott Jamieson	71-69=140	−2
T8	(Scotland) Peter Whiteford	71-69=140	−2
T8	(Chile) Felipe Aguilar	70-70=140	−2
T8	(France) Thomas Levet	69-71=140	−2

=== Third round ===
Saturday, 28 May 2011

Place	Player	Score	To par
T1	(Italy) Matteo Manassero	66-70-72=208	−5
T1	(England) Luke Donald	64-72-72=208	−5
T3	(England) Lee Westwood	72-69-69=210	−3
T3	(Paraguay) Fabrizio Zanotti	71-70-69=210	−3
T5	(France) Raphaël Jacquelin	72-70-69=211	−2
T5	(Wales) Bradley Dredge	68-74-69=211	−2
T5	(England) Simon Dyson	71-68-72=211	−2
T8	(Sweden) Peter Hanson	70-73-69=212	−1
T8	(Sweden) Johan Edfors	66-75-71=212	−1
T8	(England) David Horsey	70-68-74=212	−1
T8	(Spain) José Manuel Lara	68-70-74=212	−1
T8	(Spain) Álvaro Quirós	69-67-76=212	−1

=== Final round ===
Sunday, 29 May 2011

Place	Player	Score	To par	Money (€)
T1	(England) Lee Westwood	72-69-69-68=278	−6	Playoff
T1	(England) Luke Donald	64-72-72-70=278	−6	Playoff
3	(England) Simon Dyson	71-68-72-69=280	−4	281,700
T4	(Australia) Marcus Fraser	70-72-73-67=282	−2	191,100
T4	(Republic of Ireland) Shane Lowry	74-72-69-67=282	−2	191,100
T4	(France) Raphaël Jacquelin	72-70-69-71=282	−2	191,100
T7	(Scotland) Colin Montgomerie	69-75-71-68=283	−1	99,750
T7	(Wales) Jamie Donaldson	71-71-72-69=283	−1	99,750
T7	(Scotland) Peter Whiteford	71-69-73-70=283	−1	99,750
T7	(Sweden) Johan Edfors	66-75-71-71=283	−1	99,750
T7	(England) David Horsey	70-68-74-71=283	−1	99,750
T7	(Italy) Matteo Manassero	66-70-72-75=283	−1	99,750

=== Playoff ===
The playoff began on the par five 18th, and both laid up with their second shots. Donald played a majestic pitch to leave himself no more than six feet (1.8 m) for birdie. Westwood attempted to follow him in but overspun his approach and it retracted into the water hazard. He eventually chipped out from the drop zone and made double bogey; Donald made his birdie putt to win the title and overtook his countryman as the new World Number One.

Place	Player	Score	To par	Money (€)
1	(England) Luke Donald	4	−1	750,000
2	(England) Lee Westwood	7	+2	500,000
