= Luke Donald =

English professional golfer (born 1977)

Luke Donald OBE
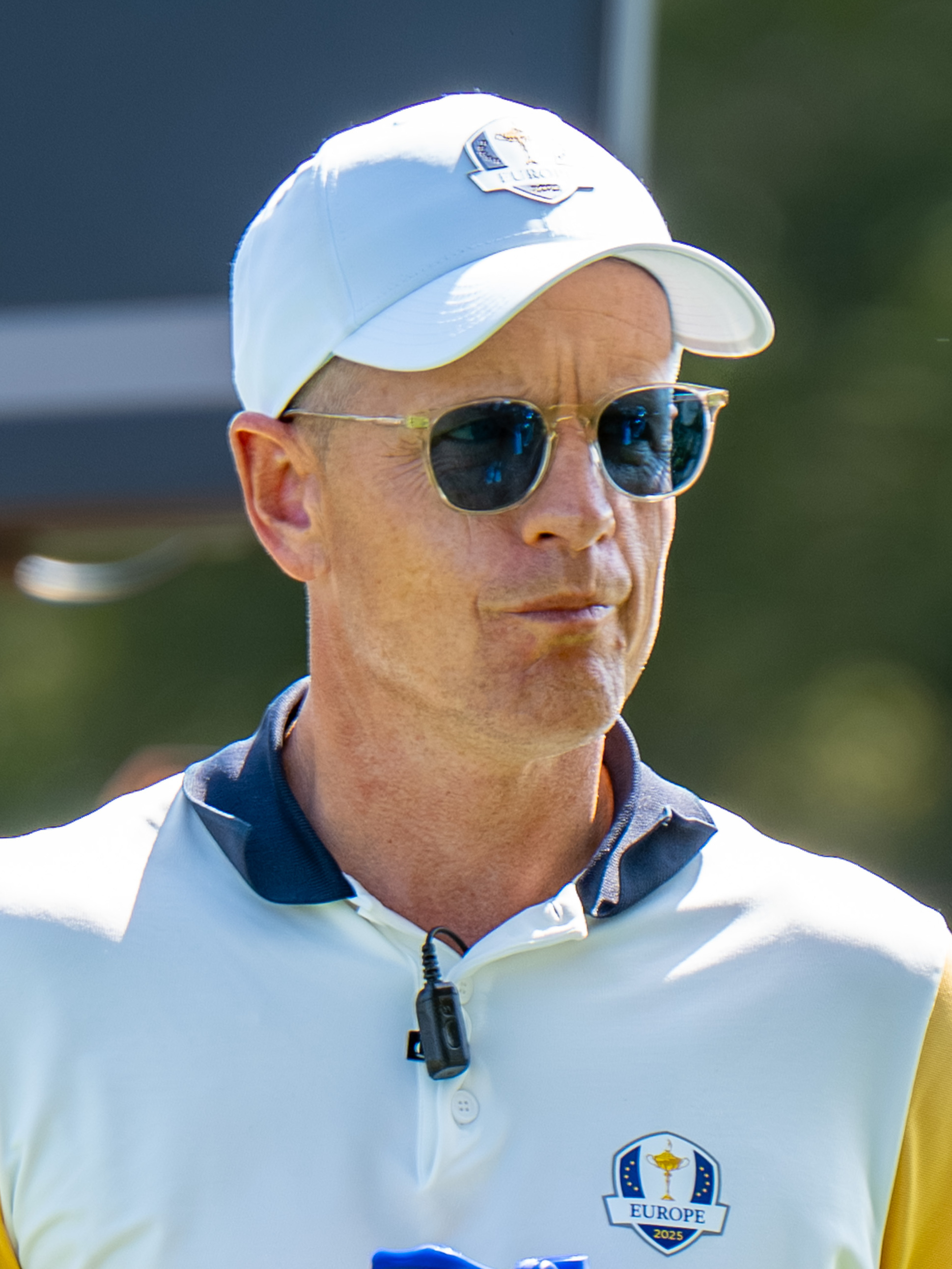
- Donald in at the 2025 Ryder Cup

Personal information
- Full name: Luke Campbell Donald
- Nationality: England
- Born: 7 December 1977 (age 48) Hemel Hempstead, Hertfordshire, England
- Height: 5 ft 9 in (1.75 m)
- Weight: 160 lb (73 kg; 11 st)
- Spouse: Diane Antonopoulos (m. 2007)
- Children: 3

Career
- Sport: Golf
- College: Northwestern University
- Turned professional: 2001
- Current tours: PGA Tour (joined 2002); European Tour (joined 2003)
- Professional wins: 17
- Highest ranking: 1 (29 May 2011) (56 weeks)

Number of wins by tour
- PGA Tour: 5
- European Tour: 7
- Japan Golf Tour: 2
- Other: 4

Best results in major championships
- Masters Tournament: T3: 2005
- PGA Championship: T3: 2006
- U.S. Open: T8: 2013
- The Open Championship: T5: 2009, 2012

Achievements and awards
- Fred Haskins Award: 1999
- PGA Tour money list winner: 2011
- PGA Tour Player of the Year: 2011
- PGA Player of the Year: 2011
- Byron Nelson Award: 2011
- Vardon Trophy: 2011
- European Tour Race to Dubai winner: 2011
- European Tour Golfer of the Year: 2011
- European Tour Players' Player of the Year: 2011

Luke Campbell Donald (born 7 December 1977) is an English professional golfer and former world number one. He plays mainly on the U.S.-based PGA Tour but is also a member of the European Tour.

Donald had an outstanding year in 2011, winning several tournaments and awards. He won the PGA Tour money list and European Race to Dubai to complete a historic double, becoming the first player to win both money lists on the PGA and European Tours in the same year. He was named the PGA Player of the Year and the European Tour Golfer of the Year. He also became the first Englishman to win the PGA Tour Player of the Year award, the PGA Tour's Vardon Trophy and the Mark H. McCormack Award for the most weeks at number one during a calendar year. He was later awarded honorary life membership of the European Tour for his achievements in 2011.

In May 2011, Donald became the number one golfer in the Official World Golf Ranking after winning the BMW PGA Championship at Wentworth Club. He held the number one position for 40 weeks between May 2011 and March 2012 before Rory McIlroy briefly took over as world number one. The pair then exchanged the number one position a further four times in the following two months. On 27 May 2012, Donald regained the world number one ranking after successfully defending his BMW PGA Championship title. He held the number one position for a further 10 weeks before McIlroy displaced him again. Donald has spent a cumulative total of 56 weeks as the World Number One and has spent over 200 weeks in the top-10. He was awarded an MBE in 2012 for services to golf. Donald has had eight top-10 finishes in major championships, with two third-place finishes. He is one of two golfers to achieve the world number one ranking without winning a major, the other being fellow Englishman Lee Westwood.

Donald captained the European team to victory in the 2023 Ryder Cup and led the team to victory again in the 2025 Ryder Cup over the United States at Bethpage Black Golf Course in New York City, USA. This in turn made him one of only two Ryder Cup Captains, the other being Tony Jacklin, to win the Ryder Cup both home and away.

== Early life ==
Although his father was from Stranraer in southwest Scotland, Donald was born in Hemel Hempstead, Hertfordshire, England. He has described himself as "half Scottish". Nevertheless, Donald plays golf as an Englishman and represented England in golf's World Cup. Donald attended the Rudolf Steiner School in Kings Langley and later the Royal Grammar School, High Wycombe. He played junior golf at Hazlemere and Beaconsfield Golf Clubs. He was twice the club champion of Beaconsfield, first winning the championship at the age of 15.

== Amateur career ==
Coming from England, he joined College Prospects of America, a service also employed by golfer Martin Laird, which created a résumé for him and sent it to all the major colleges and universities in the United States. Several coaches responded, including Wally Goodwin at Stanford University. Goodwin recruited Donald to join his golf squad, but Donald was not admitted to the university.

Donald subsequently took a golf scholarship at Northwestern University in 1997, where he studied art theory and practice, and became a member of the Sigma Chi fraternity. His golf coach at Northwestern University was Pat Goss. He won the individual NCAA Division I Men's Golf Championships men's title in 1999, beating the scoring record formerly held by Tiger Woods. He and David Lipsky share the Northwestern University school record of 202, for a 54-hole tournament score. Luke also became the first amateur to win the Chicago Open in 2000.

== Professional career ==
=== 2001–2010 ===
Donald turned professional in 2001, making his debut as a professional at the Reno-Tahoe Open on the PGA Tour courtesy of a sponsors exemption. He missed the cut in his debut, but managed to earn invitations into six more events on the PGA Tour in 2001, making three cuts. He earned his tour card for the 2002 season by finishing T23rd at the Q-School.

In 2002, Donald made his first start as a member of the PGA Tour at the Sony Open in Hawaii, finishing tied for 13th. Donald won his maiden title on the PGA Tour in November 2002 at the Southern Farm Bureau Classic. The tournament was reduced to 54 holes after significant rain meant unplayable conditions and washed out play on the Sunday. He was two strokes back at the halfway stage, but birdied holes 15, 16 and 17 on Saturday for a 67 and a one stroke advantage over South African Deane Pappas. After the final round was cancelled, Donald was crowned champion on Monday morning. With this success he became only the 11th rookie in PGA Tour history to earn more than $1 million in his first season.

The 2003 season was less successful for Donald. He played solidly and made 17 of 25 cuts on the PGA Tour, but only two of these were top-10 finishes. He did however finish in a tie for third at the Scandinavian Masters on the European Tour in August 2003. In 2004, Donald won the Omega European Masters and the Scandinavian Masters on the European Tour. In the same year he was a member of the victorious European Ryder Cup team and also won the WGC-World Cup for England in partnership with Paul Casey. In 2005, Donald made his debut at the Masters Tournament and finished tied for 3rd place. He described his debut at Augusta National as "a great performance – I am very happy with that". Donald rose in the World Rankings from 130th at the turn of the year to 13th in the world in April 2005 after his top-3 finish at the Masters. Later in the year Donald, along with Tom Watson, was one of two players to play with Jack Nicklaus in the final two rounds of golf in his career, at the 2005 Open Championship at Old Course at St Andrews.

In March 2006, Donald won his second U.S. PGA Tour event at the Honda Classic in Florida, a victory which moved him into the top ten of the World Rankings for the first time. Donald finished tied for 3rd at the 2006 PGA Championship. To date, his third-place finishes at the 2006 PGA Championship and at the 2005 Masters are his best performances in major championships. In September 2006, Donald won his singles match 2&1 against Chad Campbell in the 36th Ryder Cup to help ensure Europe won the trophy for the third successive time. Donald also won in the foursomes twice, with Sergio García. Donald took part in three matches in the Ryder Cup that year, winning all of them.

In 2008, Donald sustained an injury to his left wrist at the U.S. Open that forced him to withdraw from the tournament during the final round. His injury resulted in him having a six-month lay-off from competitive golf which meant that he missed out on playing in the Open Championship, the PGA Championship and the Ryder Cup that year. In May 2010, Donald won the Madrid Masters by one shot for his first title in four years. In October 2010, Donald was a member of the European team that won the 2010 Ryder Cup with a one-point win over the USA.

=== 2011: WGC-Accenture Match Play win ===
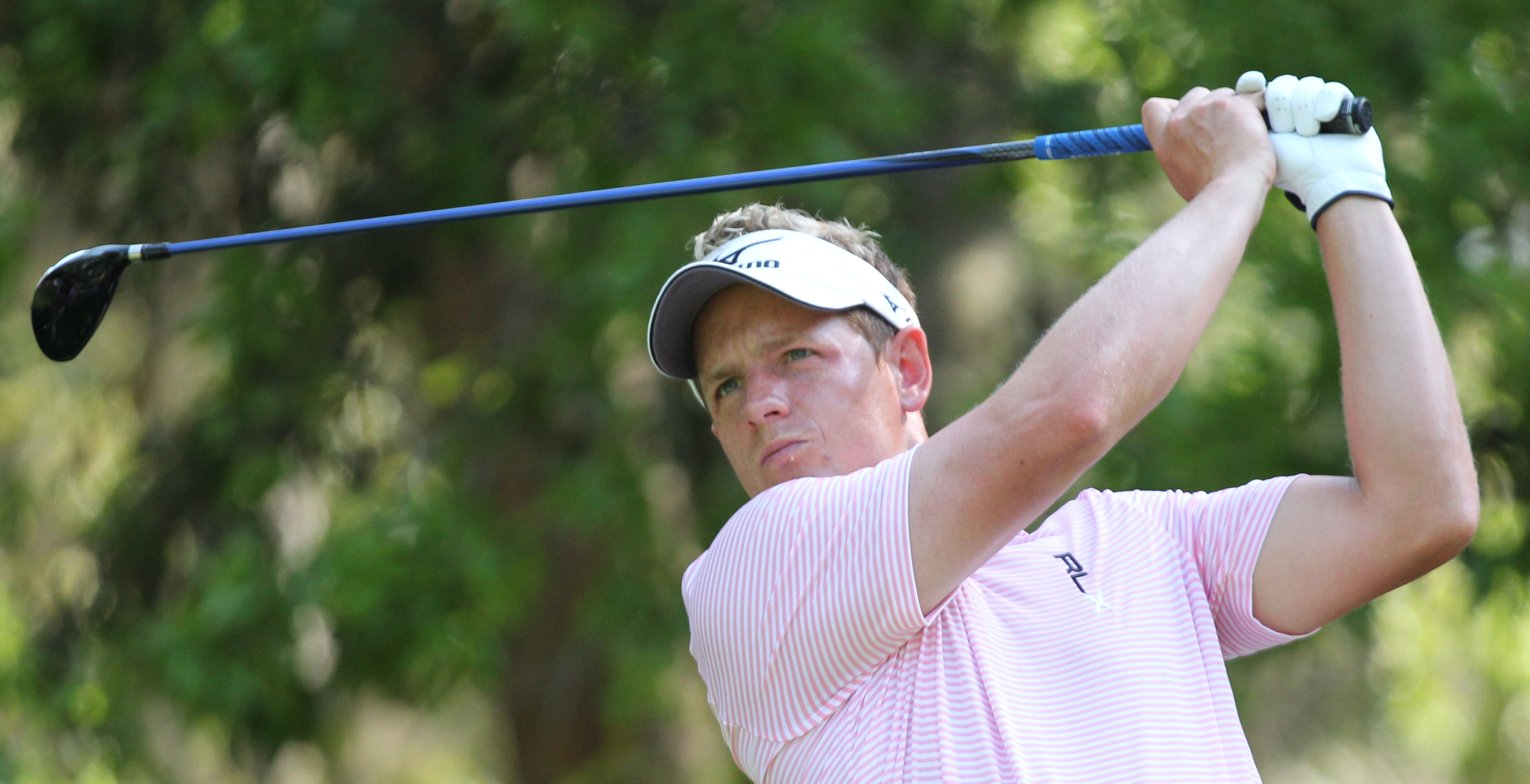
Donald in April 2011 at The Heritage

Donald's biggest win to date came in February 2011 at the WGC-Accenture Match Play Championship when he defeated the German Martin Kaymer 3&2 in the final. During the final, Donald built a three-up lead over the first five holes. However, Kaymer pegged him back and won three of the next four holes meaning the match was all square entering the back-nine. Donald was able to regain his lead with two successive wins at holes 11 and 12, then followed that up with a birdie on hole 15 to re-build his three-up lead with three holes to play. Both players then parred the par-3 16th, ensuring Donald's first World Golf Championship title and the biggest victory of his career.

Donald started the tournament off in fine fashion with a 6&5 win over American Charley Hoffman. In the second round Donald faced fellow Ryder Cup teammate Edoardo Molinari. It was a tight match that went down to the 17th, when Donald holed a birdie putt to seal a 2&1 victory. His third round opponent was another Italian, this time the young 17-year-old Matteo Manassero, who Donald beat 3&2. In the quarter-final on Saturday, he faced American Ryan Moore and won at the 14th with a 5&4 victory. In his semi-final match against Matt Kuchar, Donald was in magnificent form winning 6&5, having found himself seven-up through the first 10 holes.

==== Continued 2011 season form and World No.1 ====
Donald continued his early-season form at The Heritage at Harbour Town Golf Links when he held the lead going into final round with Jim Furyk. With the pressure of knowing that he would become the new world number 1, he shot a one under par 70 to finish tied with American Brandt Snedeker, who fired a 64 (−7). In the playoff, both players birdied the first hole and then parred the second hole. However, at the third extra hole, Donald made bogey when his chip ran narrowly past the outside edge of the hole, giving Snedeker the win with a par.

Donald continued his excellent match play form in May, reaching the final of the Volvo World Match Play Championship, which he eventually lost 2&1 to fellow Englishman Ian Poulter. He knew that had he had won this tournament he would have gone to world number one for the first time in his career. Donald had previously beaten Ross Fisher, Charl Schwartzel and Martin Kaymer to reach the final; however, he did not add the Volvo World Match Play title to his WGC-Accenture Match Play title he won earlier in the year.

In May 2011, Donald beat Lee Westwood in a playoff to win the European Tour's flagship event, the BMW PGA Championship at the Wentworth Club. This was Donald's fifth victory on the European Tour and in the process achieving one of the game's highest accolades of becoming the world number one. Westwood had entered the tournament as number one in the world and the sudden-death playoff at the end of 72 holes provided a subplot of world numbers one and two contesting for the championship. On the first playoff hole, the par-five 18th, after both laying up with their second shots, Donald played a pitch for his third shot to leave himself a putt of no more than six feet for birdie. Westwood's approach shot to the green spun back into the water hazard. Westwood chipped out from the drop zone and made double bogey, leaving Donald to hole out for a birdie to win the title and become the new world number one. Donald was the third Englishman to hold the number one position in the Official World Golf Ranking since its inception in 1986.

In July 2011, Donald won his first tournament as the world number one at the Barclays Scottish Open, which was held the week before the 2011 Open Championship. He shot a bogey-free −9 on Sunday to finish four strokes clear of Sweden's Fredrik Andersson Hed.

Donald finished second at the 2011 WGC-Bridgestone Invitational, four shots behind winner Adam Scott. He won his fourth title of the year at the Children's Miracle Network Hospitals Classic in October 2011. With the win, he secured the PGA Tour money list title, the Vardon Trophy, the Byron Nelson Award, and the PGA Player of the Year. He later was voted the PGA Tour Player of the Year.

In December, Donald finished third at the Dubai World Championship and therefore secured the European Tour Race to Dubai for 2011, becoming the first golfer to officially claim top rank on both PGA Tour and European Tour money lists in the same year (although if Tiger Woods had ever taken up official membership of the European Tour, he would have also achieved this accolade on a number of occasions).

=== 2012: Battle with McIlroy for No.1 ranking ===
At the first WGC event of the year, the WGC-Accenture Match Play Championship, Donald in defence of his title he won in 2011, was eliminated in the opening round by South African Ernie Els who beat him 5&4. He was in danger of being knocked off the top of the world rankings as both Rory McIlroy and Lee Westwood progressed to the semi-finals, either would have taken over the top spot by winning the tournament. However, neither could win the title and Donald kept his number one status. However, he did lose his status the following week, after electing not to play at The Honda Classic. McIlroy won the tournament and took over as world number one.

Two weeks later, Donald won the Transitions Championship to reclaim the number one ranking from McIlroy. This was his fifth victory on the PGA Tour and came after a solid week's play culminating in a four-man playoff with Robert Garrigus, Bae Sang-moon and Jim Furyk. Donald had earlier shot a bogey-free round of 66, which included 5 birdies in his first 11 holes to make the playoff. After a loose tee shot found the rough, Donald hit a brilliant seven iron approach to within six feet on the 18th, the first extra hole. Garrigus also knocked his close, while Furyk and Bae left themselves lengthy birdie putts. There had only been 5 birdies all day in regulation play on the 18th and when Furyk, Bae and Garrigus all missed their putts, Donald brushed his in for the victory and the number one ranking.

On 15 April 2012, Donald lost the number one ranking to McIlroy when he failed to finish inside the top 8 at the RBC Heritage. This cut short his second term as the world's number one player, ending after a four-week spell. Donald finished third at the Zurich Classic of New Orleans two weeks later to once again reclaim the number one ranking. He lost the number one spot the following week after McIlroy's runner-up finish at the Wells Fargo Championship.

On 23 May 2012, Donald was awarded honorary life membership of the European Tour in recognition of his achievements in the 2011 season. In the same week, Donald retained his title at the BMW PGA Championship at Wentworth on 27 May 2012, with a four stroke victory over Justin Rose and Paul Lawrie. He shot all four rounds in the 60s, including a final round 68 with five birdies and only one bogey to claim victory. He became only the third player to successfully defend the European Tour's flagship event, alongside Nick Faldo and Colin Montgomerie. The victory was Donald's seventh title on the European Tour and resulted in a return to World Number One for the fourth time.

Donald missed the cut at the 2012 U.S. Open, finishing +11 with rounds of 79 and 72. In his next major appearance, at the 2012 Open Championship, Donald equalled his best finish at the event of tied 5th. After rounds of 70-68-71, he produced a final round of 68 on a difficult day for scoring to advance up the leaderboard nine places to equal his best finish. On 12 August 2012, McIlroy won the 2012 PGA Championship. Donald finished in a tie for 32nd place at the tournament and again lost the world number one position to the Northern Irishman. In November, Donald won his third tournament of 2012, the Dunlop Phoenix tournament in Japan. In doing so he overtook Tiger Woods and returned to second place in the world rankings.

=== 2013 ===
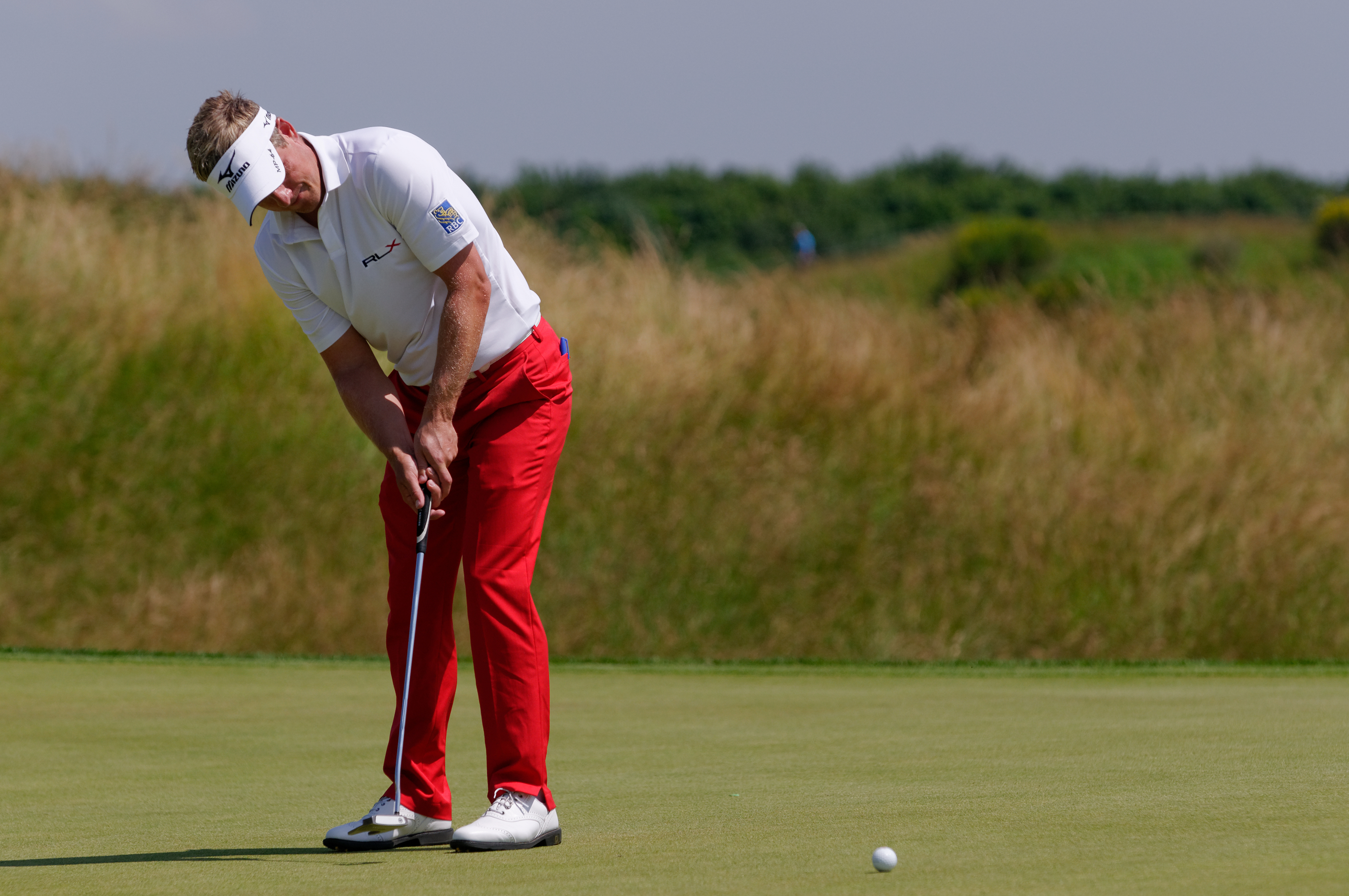
Donald at the Open de France 2013.

In March 2013, as defending champion at the Tampa Bay Championship, Donald finished in a tie for fourth. He missed his first-ever cut in a European Tour event at the Maybank Malaysian Open. It was his first missed cut in 119 career European Tour starts. As the two-time defending champion, Donald then endured the disappointment of missing the halfway cut at the 2013 BMW PGA Championship at Wentworth after shooting rounds of 78 and 72, missing the cut by four strokes.

At the 2013 U.S. Open held at Merion Golf Club, Donald was only two shots behind leader Phil Mickelson entering the final round after shooting rounds of 68, 72 and 71. Donald then shot a final round of 75 (+5) to finish in a tie for eighth, recording the first top 10-finish of his career in a U.S. Open tournament. Donald missed the halfway cut at both the 2013 Open Championship and 2013 PGA Championship, marking the first time in his career that he missed cuts at consecutive majors in a single year. In November 2013, Donald defended his title at the Dunlop Phoenix on the Japan Golf Tour, cruising to a six shot victory over the field. This was his first win of the 2013 season.

=== 2014 ===
Late in 2013, Donald changed from long-time swing coach Pat Goss, to Chuck Cook, who coached Jason Dufner to the 2013 PGA Championship. Donald started the season promisingly, with top-10s in the Honda Classic and the Valspar Championship before missing the cut by one shot at the Masters in April. Just prior to Augusta, Donald had lost a place in the world's top 30 for the first time since 2008. He returned at RBC Heritage, where he held a two-shot lead after 54 holes, only to be narrowly beaten by Matt Kuchar, but he finished 2nd and returned to the world's top 20. Several weeks later, and Donald finished in 38th at The Players Championship. He also tied for third at the BMW PGA Championship in May. He failed to make the European Ryder Cup team after losing out on a wild card pick from captain Paul McGinley. In November, Donald announced that he had switched back to his old coach Pat Goss as he believed that he was not making any progress under Cook after missing the Ryder Cup.

=== 2015 ===
In the first event of the 2015 European Tour season at the Nedbank Golf Challenge, Donald led the tournament after 36 holes after a 63, and again after 54 holes. He was unable to hold onto that lead after 72 holes and had to settle for third place behind Danny Willett and Ross Fisher. Donald had to face sectional qualifying for the U.S. Open for the first time in 11 years due to his fall to 66th in the world ranking. He managed to finish at the top of his qualifier at the Bears Club to seal a spot.

=== 2016 ===
In his first 10 events of the 2016 season, Donald failed to record a single top-10 finish and had only one top-25 in this time. This lack of form caused Donald to fail to qualify for the Masters in April, for the first time since 2004, due to falling down to 90th in the World Rankings. The following week, Donald finished in a tie for second place behind Branden Grace at the RBC Heritage. This was the fourth time he had been runner-up at the event, without have yet captured the title. It was also Donald's best PGA Tour result since 2014 at the same event. Donald had held the 54-hole lead by a single stroke, but was beaten by Grace who carded a final round 66 to win by two strokes.

=== 2017 ===
In April 2017, Donald finished runner-up at the RBC Heritage, one stroke behind the winner, Wesley Bryan. This was the fifth time that Donald had finished as a runner-up at the event, without ever winning at Harbour Town Golf Links. This moved him to third on the list of players to have runner-up finishes in an event without winning, behind Jack Nicklaus's seven at the Canadian Open and Phil Mickelson's six at the U.S. Open.

In November 2017, Donald was forced to withdraw from the RSM Classic after experiencing chest pains before his first round. Donald was rushed to hospital but was later released. His premature end to the season meant he finished outside the world's top 100 for the first time since his rookie year.

=== 2018 ===
During the 2018 PGA Tour season, Donald entered eight tournaments and missed the cut in all but two of them. His best finish was a T37 at the Genesis Open at Riviera Country Club. He finished 214th in the season-long FedEx Cup. In April 2018, back pain forced him to take several months off. Donald was granted a major medical exemption for the 2019 PGA Tour season. He had 15 starts to earn 335.891 FedEx Cup points.

European captain Thomas Bjørn named Donald as a vice-captain for the 2018 Ryder Cup. Europe regained the Ryder Cup defeating the U.S. 17 1/2 to 10 1/2 points.

On the European Tour, Donald played in the Alfred Dunhill Links Championship in October 2018 and finished T61. He also played in the Sky Sports British Masters, missing the cut. At the end of 2018 Luke Donald's world ranking had fallen to 609.

=== 2019 ===
Donald playing in only his second event of 2019 on his come back from injury, was in contention at the Valspar Championship. He shot rounds of 67-70-70 over the first three rounds to begin the final round, three behind the leader. When he then eagled the first hole, he was temporarily one off the lead, however he struggled during the rest of the final round which resulted in a 73 and T9 finish. This result moved Donald from 919th to 548th in the world rankings. Later in the season, Donald finished T10 at the Alfred Dunhill Links Championship.

=== 2020 ===
Donald's medical exemption ended in February 2020. He did not meet the terms and used a career earnings exemption for the remainder of the season.

In May 2020, accidentally during an interview, the appointed Ryder Cup captain Pádraig Harrington revealed Donald as his second vice-captain for the 43rd Ryder Cup match, to be played in September 2021, after being postponed one year because of the pandemic.

=== 2022–23 ===
On August 1, 2022, Donald was announced as the captain of the European Ryder Cup team for the 2023 matches in Italy, replacing Henrik Stenson who had been removed from the role due to his decision to join LIV Golf. Europe went on to win the cup 16 1/2–11 1/2.

=== 2025 ===
In September 2025, Donald was captain for the second time of the European team for the 2025 Ryder Cup at Bethpage Black Course in Long Island, New York. The European team won the trophy by 15–13. It was Europe's first success in the U.S. since 2012, and Donald become only the second captain after Tony Jacklin in 1985 and 1987 to lead the side to home and away victories.

== Use of coaches ==
Donald worked with Pat Goss as coach from his time at Northwestern University until 2013. He added Dave Alred from 2010 to 2012, during which period he reached World Number 1. Donald stopped working with Alred after citing an 'over-analysis' of his game as a factor behind poor performance in the 2012 Majors.

== Sponsorship ==
Donald signed with sports management company IMG in 2003. In January 2014, Donald left IMG and signed with agency Lagardère Unlimited. He has a multi-year contract with Mizuno Corp. As part of this sponsorship Donald plays with Mizuno Fairway Woods, Irons and Wedges. He also wears his trademark Mizuno visor as part of his sponsorship. It has been reported that he receives $1 million just for wearing his Mizuno visor, and this could quadruple if he wins a major event such as the Masters. Donald also has a sponsorship deal with Jordan, who supply his personal and golf shoes. He formerly had tour sponsorships with Royal Bank of Canada as well as Zurich Insurance.

Donald was sponsored by Polo Ralph Lauren for more than a decade but he announced on Twitter on 30 December 2017 that he would no longer be wearing Polo Ralph Lauren RLX on the golf course. On 2 January 2018, Donald announced that he would be sponsored by Greyson Clothiers going forward.

== Enterprises ==
In 2007, Luke Donald entered into a partnership with Terlato Wines to create a collection of bespoke wines. The first wine released (in April 2008) was a Claret-style red wine blend and a Carneros Chardonnay was released in spring 2009. Since then, a Viognier (2010) was added to the Luke Donald Collection, produced in the Central Coast of California. The wines reflect Donald's personal interest in and passion for food and wine.

== Personal life ==
Donald met his future wife, Chicago native Diane Antonopoulos, while attending Northwestern University in Evanston, Illinois. He proposed in June 2006, and the couple married on 24 June 2007 in Santorini, Greece. They have three daughters. The couple owns homes in Northfield, Illinois, Evanston, Illinois, and Jupiter, Florida.

Donald studied art theory and practice in college, and enjoys painting and drawing when not on tour. In 2002, one of his oil paintings was auctioned by the PGA Tour for charity. Donald and his wife are also avid collectors of contemporary art.

== Awards and honors ==
- In 1999, Donald won the Fred Haskins Award
- In 2011, Donald topped the PGA Tour money list
- In 2011, Donald was the PGA Tour Player of the Year

Donald was appointed Member of the Order of the British Empire (MBE) in the 2012 Birthday Honours and Officer of the Order of the British Empire (OBE) in the 2026 Birthday Honours, both for services to golf.

== Amateur wins ==
this list may be incomplete

- 1997 BB&O Amateur Championship, Lagonda Trophy
- 1998 BB&O Amateur Championship, Midland Open Amateur Championship
- 1999 NCAA Division I Championship
- 2000 Northeast Amateur
- 2001 Northeast Amateur

== Professional wins (17) ==
=== PGA Tour wins (5) ===
Legend
World Golf Championships (1)
Other PGA Tour (4)

No.	Date	Tournament	Winning score	To par	Margin of victory	Runner(s)-up
1	4 Nov 2002	Southern Farm Bureau Classic	66-68-67=201 (Note: Shortened to 54 holes due to weather.)	−15	1 stroke	(South Africa) Deane Pappas
2	12 Mar 2006	The Honda Classic	72-67-68-69=276	−12	2 strokes	(Australia) Geoff Ogilvy
3	27 Feb 2011	WGC-Accenture Match Play Championship	3 and 2			(Germany) Martin Kaymer
4	23 Oct 2011	Children's Miracle Network Hospitals Classic	66-71-70-64=271	−17	2 strokes	(United States) Justin Leonard
5	18 Mar 2012	Transitions Championship	67-68-70-66=271	−13	Playoff	(South Korea) Bae Sang-moon, (United States) Jim Furyk, (United States) Robert Garrigus

PGA Tour playoff record (1–2)

No.	Year	Tournament	Opponent(s)	Result
1	2004	Buick Invitational	(United States) John Daly, (United States) Chris Riley	Daly won with birdie on first extra hole
2	2011	The Heritage	(United States) Brandt Snedeker	Lost to par on third extra hole
3	2012	Transitions Championship	(South Korea) Bae Sang-moon, (United States) Jim Furyk, (United States) Robert Garrigus	Won with birdie on first extra hole

=== European Tour wins (7) ===
Legend
World Golf Championships (1)
Flagship events (2)
Other European Tour (4)

No.	Date	Tournament	Winning score	To par	Margin of victory	Runner(s)-up
1	1 Aug 2004	Scandinavian Masters	69-65-69-69=272	−16	5 strokes	(Sweden) Peter Hanson
2	5 Sep 2004	Omega European Masters	67-67-65-66=265	−19	5 strokes	(Spain) Miguel Ángel Jiménez
3	30 May 2010	Madrid Masters	65-67-68-67=267	−21	1 stroke	(Wales) Rhys Davies
4	27 Feb 2011	WGC-Accenture Match Play Championship	3 and 2			(Germany) Martin Kaymer
5	29 May 2011	BMW PGA Championship	64-72-72-70=278	−6	Playoff	(England) Lee Westwood
6	10 Jul 2011	Barclays Scottish Open	67-67-63=197	−19	4 strokes	(Sweden) Fredrik Andersson Hed
7	27 May 2012	BMW PGA Championship (2)	68-68-69-68=273	−15	4 strokes	(Scotland) Paul Lawrie, (England) Justin Rose

European Tour playoff record (1–0)

No.	Year	Tournament	Opponent	Result
1	2011	BMW PGA Championship	(England) Lee Westwood	Won with birdie on first extra hole

=== Japan Golf Tour wins (2) ===
No.	Date	Tournament	Winning score	To par	Margin of victory	Runner-up
1	18 Nov 2012	Dunlop Phoenix Tournament	65-64-71-68=268	−16	5 strokes	(Japan) Hideki Matsuyama (a)
2	24 Nov 2013	Dunlop Phoenix Tournament (2)	73-66-65-66=270	−14	6 strokes	(South Korea) Kim Hyung-sung

=== Other wins (4) ===
Legend
World Golf Championships (1)
Other wins (3)

No.	Date	Tournament	Winning score	To par	Margin of victory	Runner(s)-up
1	18 Sep 2000	LaSalle Bank Chicago Open (as an amateur)	68-68-69=205	−8	6 strokes	
2	21 Nov 2004	WGC-World Cup (with (England) Paul Casey)	61-64-68-64=257	−31	1 stroke	Spain − Sergio García and Miguel Ángel Jiménez
3	11 Dec 2005	Target World Challenge	72-68-68-64=205	−16	2 strokes	(Northern Ireland) Darren Clarke
4	25 Nov 2007	Gary Player Invitational (with (South Africa) Sally Little)	72-70=142	−2	1 stroke	(Republic of Ireland) Mark McNulty and (South Africa) Omar Sandys

== Results in major championships ==
Tournament	1999	2000	2001	2002	2003	2004	2005	2006	2007	2008	2009
Masters Tournament							T3	T42	T10	CUT	T38
U.S. Open				T18			T57	T12	CUT	WD	CUT
The Open Championship	CUT	CUT		CUT	CUT	CUT	T52	T35	T63		T5
PGA Championship					T23	T24	T66	T3	T23		T43

Tournament	2010	2011	2012	2013	2014	2015	2016	2017	2018
Masters Tournament	CUT	T4	T32	T25	CUT	CUT			
U.S. Open	T47	T45	CUT	T8	CUT	T58	CUT		
The Open Championship	T11	CUT	T5	CUT	T64	T12	T43		
PGA Championship	CUT	T8	T32	CUT	T40	T43	CUT	CUT	

Tournament	2019	2020	2021	2022	2023	2024	2025	2026
Masters Tournament								
PGA Championship					CUT	T68	T60	T70
U.S. Open	T72							
The Open Championship		NT						

Top 10
Did not play

WD = withdrew
CUT = missed the half-way cut
"T" = tied
NT = no tournament due to COVID-19 pandemic

=== Summary ===
Tournament	Wins	2nd	3rd	Top-5	Top-10	Top-25	Events	Cuts made
Masters Tournament	0	0	1	2	3	4	11	7
PGA Championship	0	0	1	1	2	5	18	13
U.S. Open	0	0	0	0	1	3	14	8
The Open Championship	0	0	0	2	2	4	16	9
Totals	0	0	2	5	8	16	59	37

- Most consecutive cuts made – 10 (2004 PGA – 2007 Masters)
- Longest streak of top-10s – 2 (2006 PGA – 2007 Masters)

== Results in The Players Championship ==
Tournament	2003	2004	2005	2006	2007	2008	2009	2010	2011	2012	2013	2014	2015	2016	2017
The Players Championship	CUT	CUT	T2	CUT	T16	T27	T37	T26	T4	6	T19	T38	CUT	CUT	CUT

Top 10

CUT = missed the halfway cut
"T" indicates a tie for a place

== World Golf Championships ==
=== Wins (1) ===
Year	Championship	54 holes	Winning score	Margin	Runner-up
2011	WGC-Accenture Match Play Championship	n/a	3 and 2		(Germany) Martin Kaymer

=== Results timeline ===
Results not in chronological order prior to 2015.

Tournament	2004	2005	2006	2007	2008	2009	2010	2011	2012	2013	2014	2015
Championship	T11	T11	T6	T26	T20	T20	T26	T6	T6	T43	T25	T49
Match Play		R16	R16	R32	R32	R16	R16	1	R64	R32	R64	
Invitational	T16	T6	T8	T22		T45	T46	T2	T8	T9	T50	
Champions							T3		T18	T31	T41	T40

Win
Top 10
Did not play

QF, R16, R32, R64 = Round in which player lost in match play
"T" = tied
Note that the HSBC Champions did not become a WGC event until 2009.

== Career earnings and year-end ranking by year ==
Season	PGA Tour ($)	Rank	European Tour (€)	Rank	OWGR	
Season	PGA Tour ($)	Rank	European Tour (€)	Rank	Avg. points	Rank
2001	80,747	n/a†			0.14	590
2002	1,088,205	58	76,877	n/a†	1.53	94
2003	705,121	90	165,079	115	1.11	130
2004	1,646,268	35	1,037,279	20	3.05	26
2005	2,480,562	17	1,397,385	12	4.41	13
2006	3,177,408	9	1,658,060	7	5.25	9
2007	2,190,053	29	775,093	38	3.95	17
2008	1,456,650	67	407,962	n/a†	2.81	31
2009	2,174,947	33	617,649	55	3.09	28
2010	3,665,234	7	1,678,072	15	5.65	9
2011	6,683,214	1	5,323,400	1	10.03	1
2012	3,512,024	14	2,373,540	7	8.62	2
2013	1,930,646	36	745,154	43	4.76	17
2014	1,451,440	72	724,192	38	2.99	33
2015	1,026,643	99	1,059,212	33	1.87	77
2016	1,634,515	63	114,390	154	1.72	81
2017	958,850	105	156,920	258	1.17	140
2018	81,989	218	8,879	n/a	0.26	609
2019	285,630	191	96,295	n/a	0.39	431
2020	232,875	182	0	n/a	0.28	499
2021	333,336	182	0			
Total*	36,796,359	25	16,502,254	24		

*As of 1 September 2021
†Non-member earnings.

== Team appearances ==
Amateur

- European Boys' Team Championship (representing England): 1995 (winners)
- Jacques Léglise Trophy (representing Great Britain & Ireland): 1995 (winners)
- European Youths' Team Championship (representing England): 1996, 1998
- Eisenhower Trophy (representing Great Britain & Ireland): 1998 (winners), 2000
- Palmer Cup (representing Great Britain & Ireland): 1998 (tie), 1999
- St Andrews Trophy (representing Great Britain & Ireland): 1998, 2000 (winners)
- European Amateur Team Championship (representing England): 1999, 2001
- Walker Cup (representing Great Britain & Ireland): 1999 (winners), 2001 (winners)

Professional

- Ryder Cup (representing Europe): 2004 (winners), 2006 (winners), 2010 (winners), 2012 (winners), 2023 (non-playing captain, winners), 2025 (non-playing captain, winners), 2027 (non-playing captain)
- WGC-World Cup (representing England): 2004 (winners), 2005, 2006

== See also ==
- 2001 PGA Tour Qualifying School graduates
- List of golfers with most PGA Tour wins
