= BB&O Amateur Championship =

Golf tournament

Tournament information
- Location: England
- Established: 1925
- Format: Stroke play
- Month played: August

The BB&O Amateur Championship is a 72 hole stroke play golf tournament that qualifies for World Amateur Golf Ranking points. After 36 holes the top 16 scores and ties go through to play the final two rounds. It is organised by Berks Bucks & Oxon Golf. The championship has been held annually since 1925 with exception of the years 1940 to 1945 due to the Second World War and the format has been 72 holes stroke play since 1975. Most notable winners have been ex world number 1 and Ryder Cup captain Luke Donald. and Ryder Cup player Tyrrell Hatton

== Winners ==
Year	Winner	Winner's club	Score	Runner-up	Score	Club	Venue
2025	E Davis	Studley Wood	279	B Loveard	279	Woburn	Burnham Beeches
2024	E Davis	Studley Wood	283	O Martin	288	Sand Martins	Frilford Heath
2023	H Thomas	Frilford Heath	281	L Perkins	286	Frilford Heath	Buckinghamshire
2022	T Paul	Harleyford	291	H Arnold	291	Castle Royle	The Caversham
2021	T W Lawson	Stoke Park	278	T Wilde	284	Lambourne	Maidenhead
2020	O Huggins	Frilford Heath	133	T W Lawson	136	Stoke Park	East Berkshire
2019	John Gough	Stoke Park	284	T W Lawson	286	Stoke Park	Stoke Park
2018	O Huggins	Frilford Heath	293	T Shin	296	Castle Royle	Woburn
2017	T Shin	Castle Royle	280	M Dhaubhadel	286	Calcot Park	Frilford Heath
2016	J Kemp	Woburn	289	T Shin	291	Castle Royle	The Oxfordshire
2015	John Gough	Stoke Park	275	J Kemp	280	Woburn	Ellesborough
2014	D Langley	Castle Royle	270	J Kemp	278	Woburn	Mentmore
2013	T W Lawson	Stoke Park	287	C Buttivant	290	Gerrards Cross	Stoke Park
2012	M Smith	Newbury Racecourse	282	A Watkins	283	East Berkshire	East Berkshire
2011	J Kemp	Woburn	269	L Woodford	277	Woburn	Sonning
2010	Tyrrell Hatton	Harleyford	269	L Robinson	280	Tadmarton Heath	Denham
2009	S Bolton	Goring & Streatley	275	A Walton	277	Frilford Heath	Burnham Beeches
2008	A Walton	Frilford Heath	287	T Wilde	288	Beaconsfield	Castle Royle
2007	K Freeman	Stoke Park	276	S Barwick	282	Stoke Park	The Berkshire
2006	T W Lawson	Ellesborough	275	M Briggs	275	Stoke Park	Ellesborough
2005	T W Lawson	Ellesborough	276	K Freeman	288	Stoke Park	Stoke Park
2004	T W Lawson	Ellesborough	291	G Blainey	294	East Berkshire	Woburn
2003	L Gauthier	East Berkshire	271	T W Lawson	274	Ellesborough	East Berkshire
2002	A Walton	Frilford Heath	284	T Whittaker	288	Beaconsfield	Beaconsfield
2001	C Bowler	Oxford City	275	K Freeman	278	Stoke Park	Gerrards Cross
2000	K Freeman	Gerrards Cross	290	T W Lawson	290	Ellesborough	Harleyford
1999	L Rusher	Stoke Poges	289	M Housego	293	Wycombe Heights	Frilford Heath
1998	Luke Donald	Beaconsfield	293	A Stubbs	299	The Oxfordshire	The Oxfordshire
1997	Luke Donald	Beaconsfield	270	S Jarman	276	Woburn	Burnham Beeches
1996	J Carlsen	Frilford Heath	283	R Stroud	286	Tadmarton	Ellesborough
1995	D G Lane	Goring & Streatley	288	S Barwick	288	East Berkshire	Goring & Streatley
1994	D A Fisher	Stoke Poges	281	L R Bishop	285	Stoke Poges	Denham
1993	R Walton	Calcot Park	283	Van Phillips	285	Stoke Poges	The Berkshire
1992	Van Phillips	Stoke Poges	277	S Maynard	278	East Berkshire	Maidenhead
1991	Van Phillips	Stoke Poges	288	L Bishop	292	Stoke Poges	Stoke Poges
1990	S Barwick	East Berkshire	292	D Cowap	293	East Berkshire	Frilford Heath
1989	H Bareham	Henley	284	J B Berney	287	Gerrards Cross	Temple
1988	F George	Beaconsfield	283	S Barwick	283	East Berkshire	East Berkshire
1987	F George	Beaconsfield	282	D G Lane	284	Goring & Streatley	Gerrards Cross
1986	D G Lane	Goring & Streatley	288	M Orris	295	Henley	Burnham Beeches
1985	M T Rapley	Sonning	288	F George	288	Beaconsfield	Denham
1984	N G Webber	Goring & Streatley	284	A P S Brewer	294	Denham	Ellesborough
1983	M Orris	Henley	289	D G Lane	289	Goring & Streatley	Berkshire
1982	D G Lane	Goring & Streatley	286	M T Rapley	290	Sonning	Maidenhead
1981	M T Rapley	Sonning	283	J B Berney	294	Gerrards Cross	Calcot Park
1980	D G Lane	Goring & Streatley	293	J B Berney	293	Gerrards Cross	Beaconsfield
1979	A Millar	Denham Artisans	303	J B Berney	305	Gerrards Cross	Frilford Heath
1978	A L Parsons	Harewood Downs	302	D Davis	305	Temple	Stoke Poges
1977	D Owers	Maidenhead	285	R Fish	286	East Berkshire	Temple
1976	W S Gronow	East Berkshire	288	J B Berney	290	Gerrards Cross	East Berkshire
1975	A L Parsons	Harewood Downs	291	J B Berney	293	Gerrards Cross	Gerrards Cross
1974	Michael King	Reading	139	A Jackson	140	Burnham Beeches	Burnham Beeches
1973	Michael King	Reading	139	C Speight	143	East Berkshire	Berkshire
1972	J A Putt	Frilford Heath	140	Michael King	142	Reading	Denham
1971	J G K Borrett	Denham	137	W S Gronow	144	East Berkshire	Sonning
1970	Michael King	Reading	148	W S Gronow	149	East Berkshire	Maidenhead
1969	Michael King	Reading	143	C J Ball	143	Newbury	Beaconsfield
1968	Michael King	Reading	140	A W Holmes	141	Denham	Calcot Park
1967	R W J Addey	East Berkshire	147	J Lawrence	147	Stoke Poges	East Berkshire
1966	J Lawrence	Stoke Poges	144	R W J Addey	145	East Berkshire	Temple
1965	J Coomber	Frilford Heath	145	J Lawrence	146	Stoke Poges	Frilford Heath
1964	J Lawrence	Stoke Poges	143	J Coomber	146	Frilford Heath	Berkshire
1963	J Coomber	Frilford Heath	151	J Lawrence	151	Stoke Poges	Sonning
1962	J Lawrence	Stoke Poges	153	L Saunders	153	Gerrards Cross	Stoke Poges
1961	J Lawrence	Beaconsfield Arts	148	P Cross	149	Oxford City	Burnham Beeches
1960	T O W Cocker						
1959	J K Tullis						
1958	F B Reed						
1957	J Niven						
1956	J J Macbeth						
1955	R S G Scott						
1954	R K Pitambor						
1953	I R Harris						
1952	G M F Bisset						
1951	N R M Philcox						
1950	B W Parmenter						
1949	J E Kitchin						
1948	A R Strong						
1947	R Sweeny Jr						
1946	R Sweeny Jr						
1940-1945	No Competition						
1939	H C M Stono						
1938	C B Booth						
1937	A Keith						
1936	E H Chambers						
1935	C W Mole						
1934	J O H Greenly						
1933	G R Girdlestone						
1932	R W Fortescue						
1931	D Provan						
1930	C B Booth						
1929	C H Brickhill						
1928	G H MacCallum						
1927	G H MacCallum						
1926	R W A Speed						
1925	G H MacCallum						

Multiple Winners (top 5)

Winner	Number of wins
T W Lawson	5
Michael King	5
D G Lane	4
J Lawrence	4
G H MacCallum	3

Greatest Winning Margin (since moving to 72 holes)

Winner	Winning margin	Year
T W Lawson	12	2005
Tyrrell Hatton	11	2010
M T Rapley	11	1981
N G Webber	10	1984
D Langley	8	2014
J Kemp	8	2011
D G Lane	7	1986

Number top 2 finishes (Top 5 players)

Player	Number of top 2 finishes
T W Lawson	9
J Lawrence	7
Michael King	6
D G Lane	6
J B Berney	6
J Kemp	4
K Freeman	4
S Barwick	4
G H MacCallum	3
A Walton	3
Van Phillips	3
F George	3
M T Rapley	3
J Coomber	3
T Shin	3
W S Gronow	3
