= Michael King (golfer) =

English golfer (born 1950)

Personal information
- Full name: Michael Geoffrey King
- Nationality: England
- Born: 15 February 1950 (age 76) Reading, Berkshire, England
- Height: 6 ft 2.5 in (1.89 m)
- Weight: 210 lb (95 kg; 15 st)

Career
- Sport: Golf
- Turned professional: 1974
- Former tours: European Tour; European Seniors Tour
- Professional wins: 1

Number of wins by tour
- European Tour: 1

Best results in major championships
- Masters Tournament: DNP
- PGA Championship: DNP
- U.S. Open: DNP
- The Open Championship: T36: 1979

Michael Geoffrey King (born 15 February 1950) is an English professional golfer.

== Early life and amateur career ==
King was born in Reading, Berkshire. As an amateur, he won the Lytham Trophy in 1973, and played in the Walker Cup in 1969 and 1973.

== Professional career ==
King began a career as a stockbroker, but following the stock market crash of 1974 he became a professional golfer. He spent many years on the European Tour. 1979 was his best season by far: he won his sole European Tour title at the SOS Talisman TPC; was joint runner-up in the Belgian Open; made only appearances in the Ryder Cup and the World Cup; and finished the year in fifth place on the European Tour's Order of Merit. His career was curtailed by ankylosing spondylitis.

== Amateur wins ==
- 1968 BB&O Amateur Championship
- 1969 BB&O Amateur Championship
- 1970 BB&O Amateur Championship
- 1973 Lytham Trophy, BB&O Amateur Championship
- 1974 BB&O Amateur Championship

== Professional wins (1) ==
=== European Tour wins (1) ===
No.	Date	Tournament	Winning score	Margin of victory	Runner-up
1	23 Sep 1979	SOS Talisman TPC	−7 (71-67-72-71=281)	1 stroke	(England) Brian Waites

== Results in major championships ==
Tournament	1969	1970	1971	1972	1973	1974	1975	1976	1977	1978	1979
The Open Championship	CUT							CUT	T48	CUT	T36

Tournament	1980	1981	1982	1983	1984	1985	1986	1987
The Open Championship	CUT	CUT	59		CUT	CUT		CUT

Note: King only played in The Open Championship.

Did not play

CUT = missed the half-way cut (3rd round cut in 1976, 1984 and 1985 Open Championships)
"T" = tied

== Team appearances ==
Amateur

- Walker Cup (representing Great Britain & Ireland): 1969, 1973
- St Andrews Trophy (representing Great Britain & Ireland): 1970 (winners), 1972 (winners)
- Commonwealth Tournament (representing Great Britain): 1971
- European Amateur Team Championship (representing England): 1971 (winners), 1973 (winners)

Professional

- Ryder Cup (representing Europe): 1979
- World Cup (representing England): 1979
