= Van Phillips (golfer) =

English professional golfer

Personal information
- Full name: Vanslow Luke Phillips
- Nationality: England
- Born: 27 March 1972 (age 54) London, England
- Height: 5 ft 8 in (1.73 m)
- Weight: 167 lb (76 kg; 11.9 st)
- Life partner: Samantha Sharkey

Career
- Sport: Golf
- Turned professional: 1993
- Current tour: European Senior Tour
- Former tours: European Tour; Challenge Tour
- Professional wins: 7

Number of wins by tour
- European Tour: 1
- Challenge Tour: 1
- European Senior Tour: 1
- Other: 4

Best results in major championships
- Masters Tournament: DNP
- PGA Championship: DNP
- U.S. Open: DNP
- The Open Championship: CUT: 1997

Vanslow Luke Phillips (born 27 March 1972) is an English professional golfer.

== Career ==
Phillips was born in London. As an amateur, he won the Berkshire Trophy twice before turning professional after playing in the Walker Cup at the end of 1993. In 1995, he won twice on the Hippo Tour and led the Order of Merit. In 1996, he won the Interlaken Open on the second-tier Challenge Tour and graduated to the European Tour for the following season by finishing in 6th place on the tour rankings at the end of the year.

Phillips made steady progress, finishing inside the top 100 on the Order of Merit in each of his first four seasons on the European Tour. He captured his maiden win in 1999, at the Algarve Portuguese Open, where he overcame John Bickerton in a playoff. In 2001, he struggled to hold on to his tour card, and has competed mostly on the Challenge Tour since then. He won the Mauritius Open, a non-tour event in 2006.

Early in his professional career Phillips regularly played in a shirt and tie as part of a sponsorship deal.

== Amateur wins ==
- 1991 BB&O Amateur Championship
- 1992 BB&O Amateur Championship
- 1992 Berkshire Trophy
- 1993 Berkshire Trophy, Golf Illustrated Gold Vase

== Professional wins (7) ==
=== European Tour wins (1) ===
No.	Date	Tournament	Winning score	Margin of victory	Runner-up
1	7 Mar 1999	Algarve Portuguese Open	−12 (72-68-68-68=276)	Playoff	(England) John Bickerton

European Tour playoff record (1–0)

No.	Year	Tournament	Opponent	Result
1	1999	Algarve Portuguese Open	(England) John Bickerton	Won with par on first extra hole

=== Challenge Tour wins (1) ===
No.	Date	Tournament	Winning score	Margin of victory	Runner-up
1	28 Jul 1996	Interlaken Open	−13 (69-66-68=203)	1 stroke	(Sweden) Mårten Olander

=== Jamega Pro Golf Tour wins (1) ===
No.	Date	Tournament	Winning score	Margin of victory	Runners-up
1	30 Sep 2014	Cumberwell Park	−9 (67-66=133)	2 strokes	(England) Robbie Busher, (England) Steve Surry

=== Hippo Tour wins (2) ===
- 1995 Collingtree Park, Pyrford

=== Other wins (1) ===
- 2006 Mauritius Open

=== European Senior Tour wins (1) ===
No.	Date	Tournament	Winning score	Margin of victory	Runners-up
1	22 Sep 2024	WINSTONgolf Senior Open	−12 (70-66-68=204)	Playoff	(England) Phillip Archer, (Brazil) Adilson da Silva

European Senior Tour playoff record (1–0)

No.	Year	Tournament	Opponent	Result
1	2024	WINSTONgolf Senior Open	(England) Phillip Archer, (Brazil) Adilson da Silva	Won with birdie on fourth extra hole

== Results in major championships ==
Tournament	1997
The Open Championship	CUT

CUT = missed the half-way cut
Note: Phillips only played in The Open Championship.

== Team appearances ==
Amateur

- Walker Cup (representing Great Britain & Ireland): 1993
