= Pacific Rubiales Colombia Classic =

Colombian golf tournament

Tournament information
- Location: Barranquilla, Colombia
- Established: 2012
- Course: Barranquilla Country Club
- Par: 72
- Length: 6,827 yards (6,243 m)
- Tour: Challenge Tour
- Format: Stroke play
- Prize fund: €190,000
- Month played: March
- Final year: 2012

Tournament record score
- Aggregate: 280 Phillip Archer (2012)
- To par: −8 as above

Final champion
- (England) Phillip Archer
- Location in Colombia

The Pacific Rubiales Colombia Classic was a golf tournament that is co-sanctioned by the Challenge Tour and the Pacific Colombia Tour. It was played for the first and only time in 2012 at the Barranquilla Country Club in Barranquilla, Colombia.

== Winners ==
Year	Winner	Score	To par	Margin of victory	Runners-up
2012	(England) Phillip Archer	280	−8	1 stroke	(England) Chris Lloyd (Denmark) Morten Ørum Madsen
