= 2002 PGA EuroPro Tour =

Golf tour season

2002 PGA EuroPro Tour season
- Duration: 30 April 2002 – 19 October 2002
- Number of official events: 17
- Most wins: (Republic of Ireland) Eamonn Brady (2) (England) Richard McEvoy (2) (Scotland) Paul McKechnie (2)
- Order of Merit: (Scotland) Paul McKechnie

The 2002 PGA EuroPro Tour, titled as the 2002 Matchroom Sport PGA EuroPro Tour for sponsorship reasons, was the inaugural season of the PGA EuroPro Tour, a third-tier tour recognised by the European Tour.

The tour was created as the merger of the EuroPro Tour and the PGA MasterCard Tour.

== Schedule ==
The following table lists official events during the 2002 season.

Date	Tournament	Location	Purse (£)	Winner (Note: The number in brackets after each winner's name is the number of PGA EuroPro Tour events they had won up to and including that tournament. It is rare for someone to accumulate many wins on the PGA EuroPro Tour as success at this level usually leads to promotion to the Challenge Tour.)
2 May	Hasseroder Classic	Hertfordshire	40,000	(Scotland) Paul McKechnie (1)
10 May	Pokermillion.com Classic	Kent	40,000	(England) Nick Ludwell (1)
24 May	Quinta da Marinha Oitavos Golfe Open	Portugal	40,000	(England) Richard McEvoy (1)
30 May	Sky Sports Trophy	Berkshire	40,000	(Scotland) Graeme McInnes (1)
14 Jun	ISM International	Isle of Man	40,000	(Republic of Ireland) Eamonn Brady (1)
21 Jun	Grampian International Freight Northern Open	Aberdeenshire	40,000	(Scotland) Fraser Mann (1)
28 Jun	Daily Star Trophy	Oxfordshire	40,000	(England) Simon Lilly (1)
5 Jul	Owston Hall Challenge	South Yorkshire	40,000	(England) Richard McEvoy (2)
19 Jul	Sweetwoods Park Trophy	Kent	40,000	(England) Chris Gill (1)
2 Aug	Morley Hayes Open	Derbyshire	40,000	(Scotland) Peter Whiteford (1)
9 Aug	Admiral Golf Challenge	Monmouthshire	40,000	(Wales) Matthew Griffiths (1)
16 Aug	Glenmuir Classic	East Lothian	40,000	(Republic of Ireland) Eamonn Brady (2)
23 Aug	Marriott Hollins Hall Trophy	West Yorkshire	40,000	(England) Phillip Archer (1)
30 Aug	Highland Spring Golf Challenge	East Sussex	40,000	(Wales) Kyron Sullivan (1)
4 Oct	Peugeot International	Bristol	40,000	(Scotland) David Orr (1)
11 Oct	Dudsbury Challenge	Dorset	40,000	(England) Lee Thompson (1)
19 Oct	Matchroom PGA EuroPro Tour Championship	Portugal	75,000	(Scotland) Paul McKechnie (2)

== Order of Merit ==
The Order of Merit was based on prize money won during the season, calculated in Pound sterling. The top four players on the Order of Merit (not otherwise exempt) earned status to play on the 2003 Challenge Tour.

Position	Player	Prize money (£)	Status earned
1	(Scotland) Paul McKechnie	32,236	Promoted to Challenge Tour
2	(England) John E. Morgan	30,854	Promoted to European Tour (Top 15 of Challenge Tour Rankings)
3	(Republic of Ireland) Eamonn Brady	29,905	Promoted to Challenge Tour
4	(Scotland) David Orr	29,088	Promoted to Challenge Tour
5	(England) Martin LeMesurier	26,683	Promoted to Challenge Tour
6	(Scotland) Peter Whiteford	22,826	
7	(England) Richard McEvoy	22,686	
8	(England) Nick Ludwell	17,660	
9	(England) Phillip Archer	17,253	Qualified for European Tour (Top 25 in Q School)
10	(Wales) Kyron Sullivan	16,423	
