= Phillip Archer =

English professional golfer

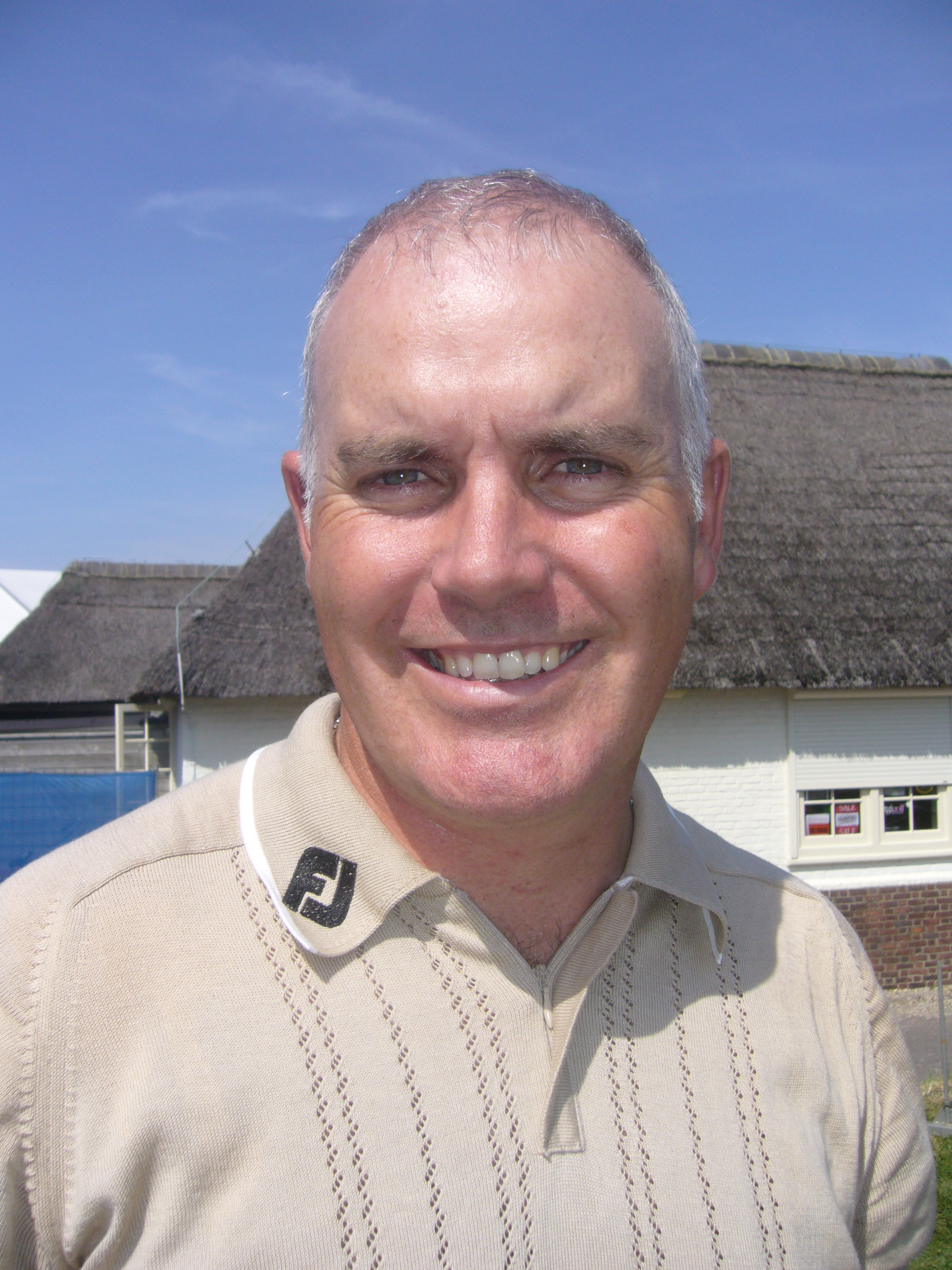
- Archer at the 2009 KLM Open

Personal information
- Full name: Phillip Neil Archer
- Nationality: England
- Born: 17 March 1972 (age 54) Warrington, England
- Height: 5 ft 11 in (1.80 m)
- Weight: 189 lb (86 kg; 13.5 st)

Career
- Sport: Golf
- Turned professional: 1991
- Current tour: European Senior Tour
- Former tours: European Tour; Challenge Tour
- Professional wins: 8
- Highest ranking: 95 (14 October 2007)

Number of wins by tour
- Challenge Tour: 3
- Other: 5

Best results in major championships
- Masters Tournament: DNP
- PGA Championship: DNP
- U.S. Open: T48: 2006
- The Open Championship: 81st: 2008

Phillip Neil Archer (born 17 March 1972) is an English professional golfer.

== Career ==
Archer was born in Warrington. He is best known for shooting a score of 60 in the first round at the Celtic Manor Wales Open in 2006. He had a chance of being the first player on the European Tour to shoot a 59, but missed his birdie putt on the 18th green. His best European Tour Order of Merit finish is 29th in 2007. He lost his card after the 2010 season. He has won three tournaments on the Challenge Tour, Europe's second-tier tour. He won the Rolex Trophy in 2004, the Allianz Open Côtes d'Armor Bretagne in 2011 and the Pacific Rubiales Colombia Classic in 2012.

== Professional wins (8) ==
=== Challenge Tour wins (3) ===
No.	Date	Tournament	Winning score	Margin of victory	Runner(s)-up
1	22 Aug 2004	Rolex Trophy	−18 (65-67-66=198) (Note: Shortened to 54 holes due to weather.)	5 strokes	(England) Lee Slattery
2	12 Jun 2011	Allianz Open Côtes d'Armor Bretagne	−7 (69-67-61-76=273)	1 stroke	(Austria) Roland Steiner
3	11 Mar 2012	Pacific Rubiales Colombia Classic	−8 (71-71-68-70=280)	1 stroke	(England) Chris Lloyd, (Denmark) Morten Ørum Madsen

Challenge Tour playoff record (0–1)

No.	Year	Tournament	Opponents	Result
1	2004	Volvo Finnish Open	(Sweden) Johan Axgren, (Finland) Roope Kakko (a)	Kakko won with birdie on first extra hole

=== PGA EuroPro Tour wins (1) ===
No.	Date	Tournament	Winning score	Margin of victory	Runners-up
1	23 Aug 2002	Marriott Hollins Hall Trophy	−13 (66-67-67=200)	2 strokes	(England) James Holmes, (Scotland) Murray Urquhart

=== Other wins (4) ===
- 2000 Leeds Cup
- 2016 Leeds Cup
- 2021 Leeds Cup
- 2022 Leeds Cup

== Playoff record ==
European Tour playoff record (0–1)

No.	Year	Tournament	Opponent	Result
1	2007	Omega European Masters	(Australia) Brett Rumford	Lost to birdie on first extra hole

European Senior Tour playoff record (0–2)

No.	Year	Tournament	Opponent(s)	Result
1	2022	WINSTONgolf Senior Open	(Australia) Richard Green	Lost to birdie on fifth extra hole
2	2024	WINSTONgolf Senior Open	(Brazil) Adilson da Silva, (England) Van Phillips	Phillips won with birdie on fourth extra hole

== Results in major championships ==
Tournament	2006	2007	2008	2009	2010
U.S. Open	T48		CUT		
The Open Championship			81		CUT

Note: Archer never played in the Masters Tournament or the PGA Championship.

Did not play

CUT = missed the half-way cut
"T" = tied

== Team appearances ==
Professional

- Seve Trophy (representing Great Britain & Ireland): 2007 (winners)
- PGA Cup (representing Great Britain and Ireland): 2017 (winners)

== See also ==
- 2009 European Tour Qualifying School graduates
