= List of world number one male golfers =

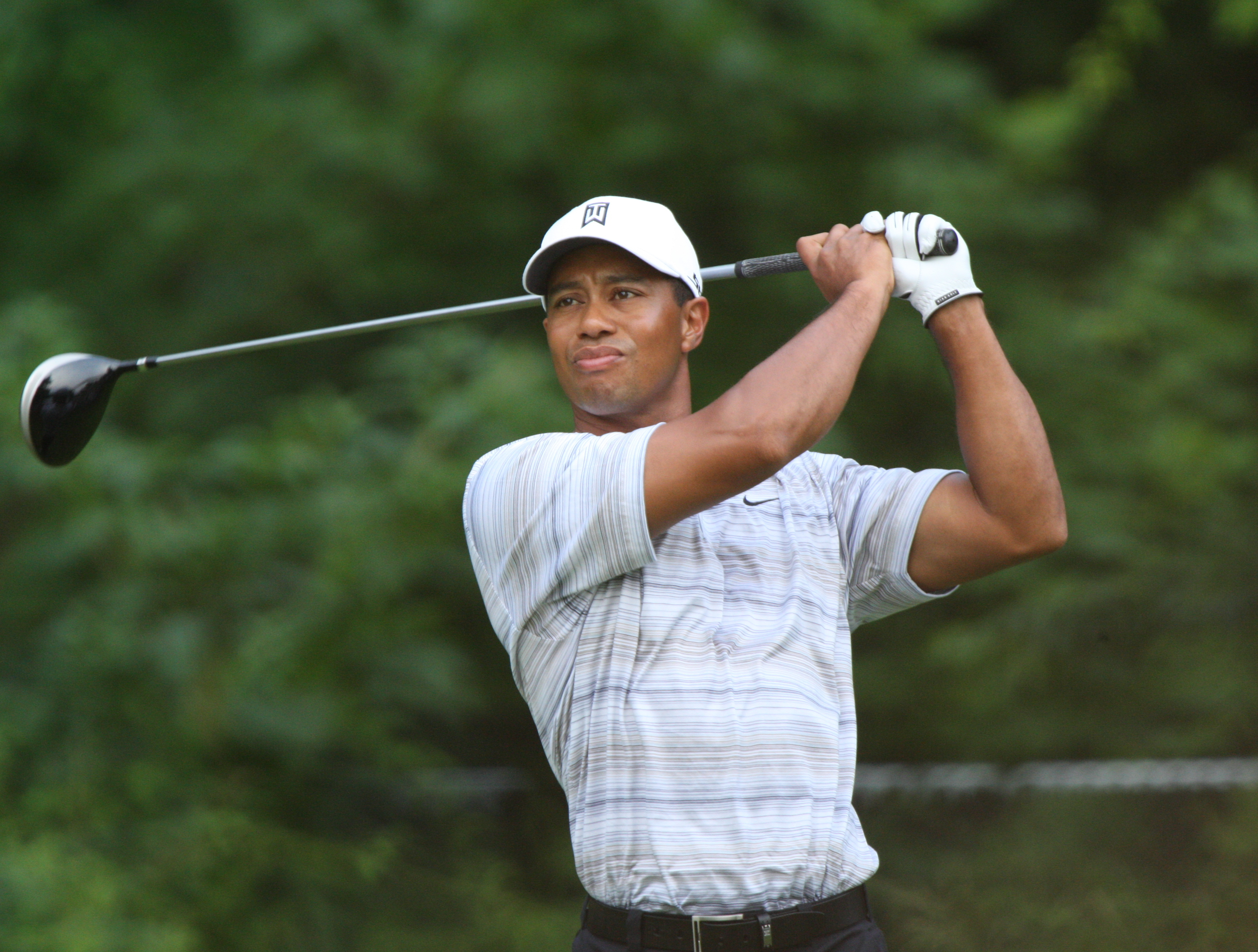
Tiger Woods, the record holder of most weeks spent as world No. 1.

The following is a list of golfers who have been top of the Official World Golf Ranking (originally known as the Sony Ranking), since the rankings started on 6 April 1986. As of 22 November 2026, Scottie Scheffler is the number one ranked golfer.

The rankings are calculated each week based on finishing positions in individual tournaments (i.e. not pairs or team events) over a "rolling" two-year period with a maximum of 52 tournaments and a minimum divisor of 40 events. During 2018, nearly 400 tournaments on 20 tours were covered by the ranking system. All players competing in these tournaments are included in the rankings. In 2023, 24 tours factored into the world rankings.

A total of 25 golfers from ten countries spanning four continents have been ranked world number one. Five countries; the United States, England, Australia, Spain and Germany have had multiple world number ones. The United States has had nine golfers ranked number one, the most of any country.

Tiger Woods has spent the most consecutive weeks (281) and most total weeks (683) at the top of the rankings, and Tom Lehman the fewest total weeks, having spent just a single week at the top in April 1997. Four golfers have spent one or more entire calendar years atop the rankings: Nick Faldo (1993), Greg Norman (1996), Woods (2000, 2001, 2002, 2003, 2006, 2007, 2008, 2009), and Scheffler (2024, 2025). Lee Westwood and Luke Donald are the only world number one golfers to have not won a major championship. The youngest to reach No. 1 was Woods, at 21 years, 167 days old, and Lehman was the oldest at 38 years, 44 days old.

== Number one ranked men ==
Note 1: In the first column, each number signifies the first time that golfer was ranked number one.
Note 2: In the "Cumulative total" column, each boldface number signifies total weeks as of the most recent time that golfer was ranked number one.

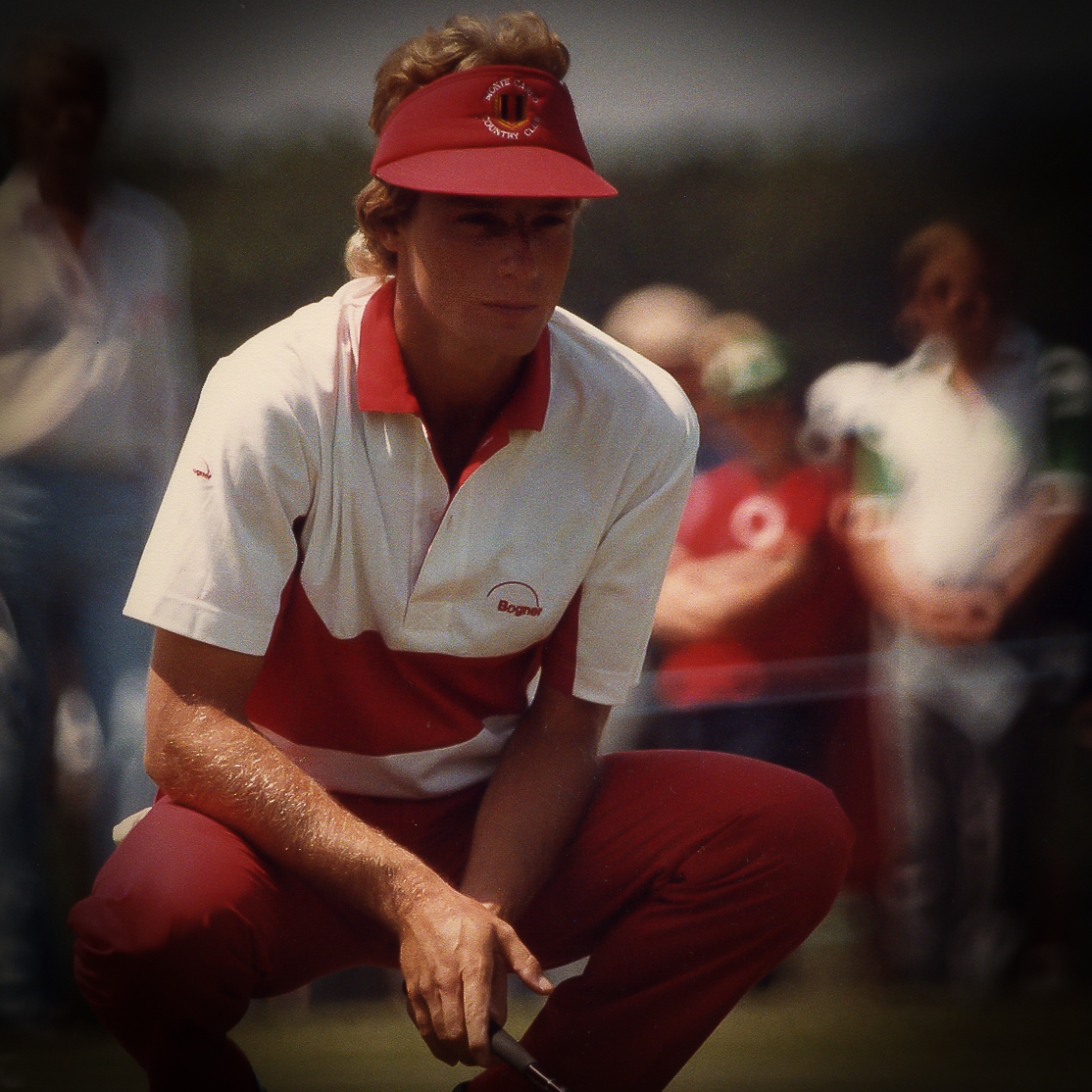
Bernhard Langer was the first golfer to be ranked world No. 1.

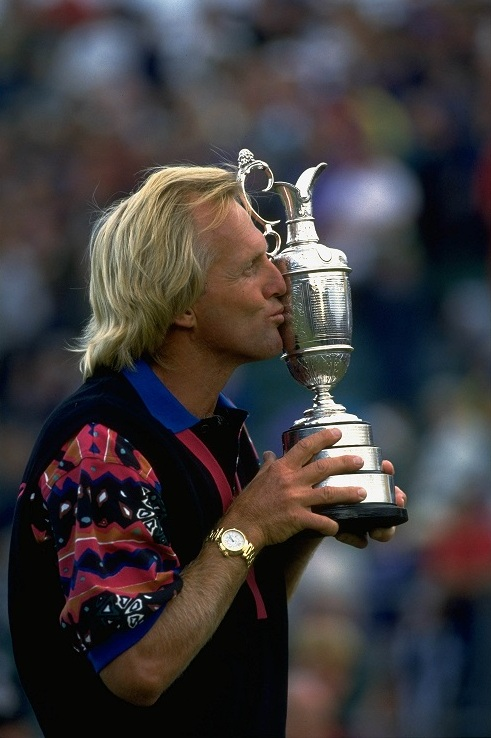
Greg Norman spent the most weeks atop of the world rankings in both the 1980s and 1990s.

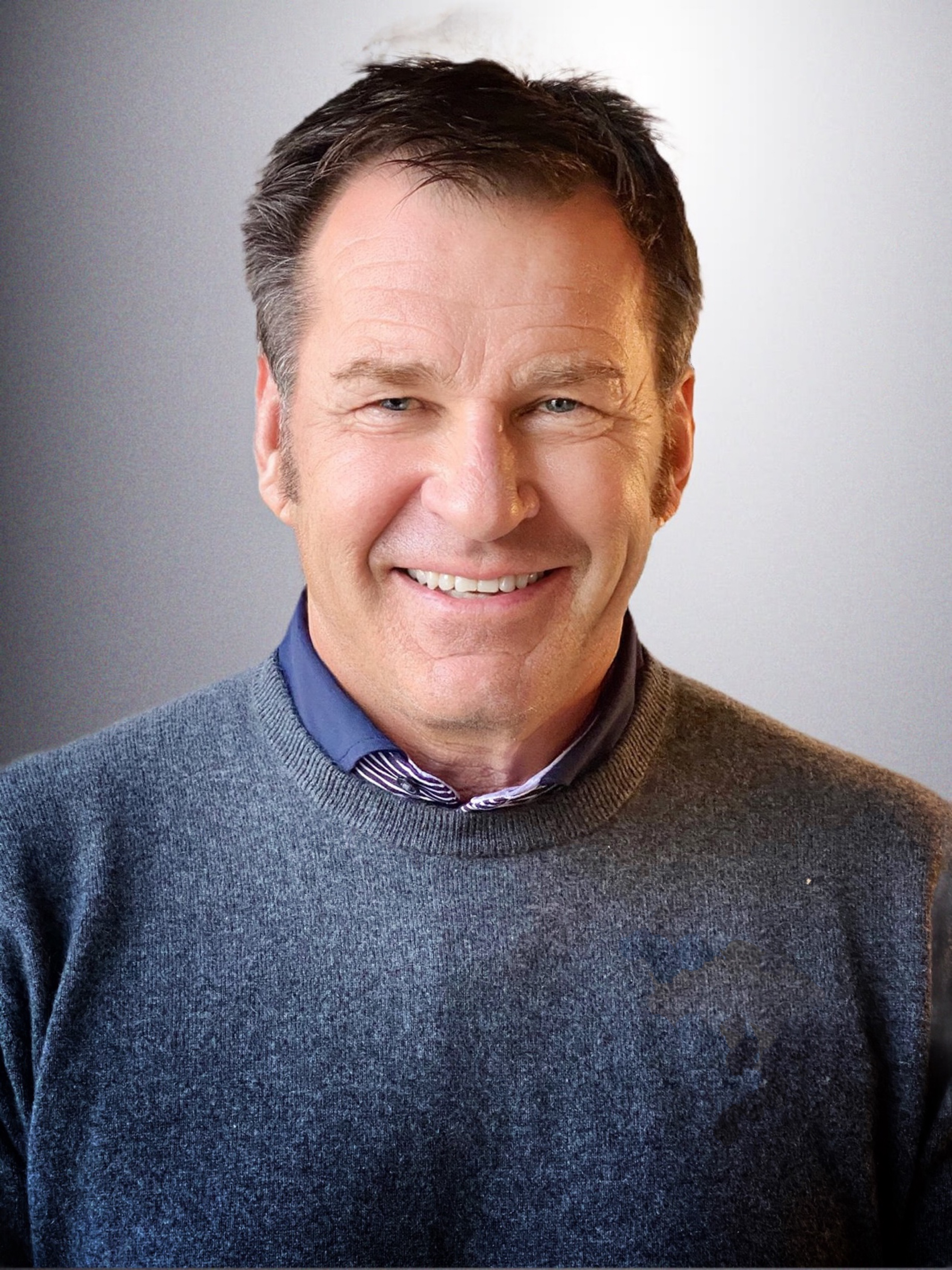
Nick Faldo is one of only six players to have held the world No. 1 ranking for an entire calendar year, doing so in 1993.

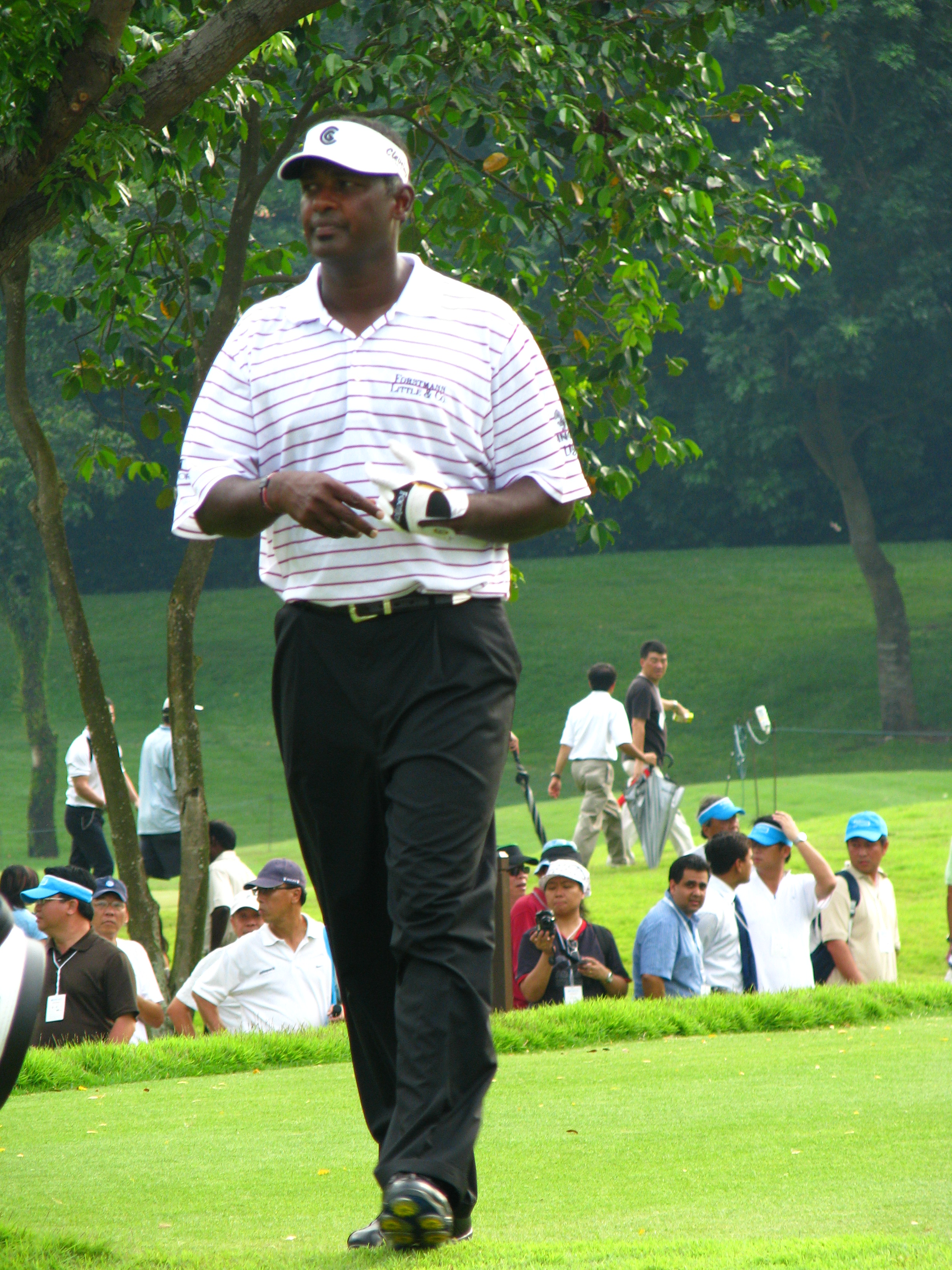
Vijay Singh was the only golfer other than Woods to be ranked world No. 1 in the 2000s.

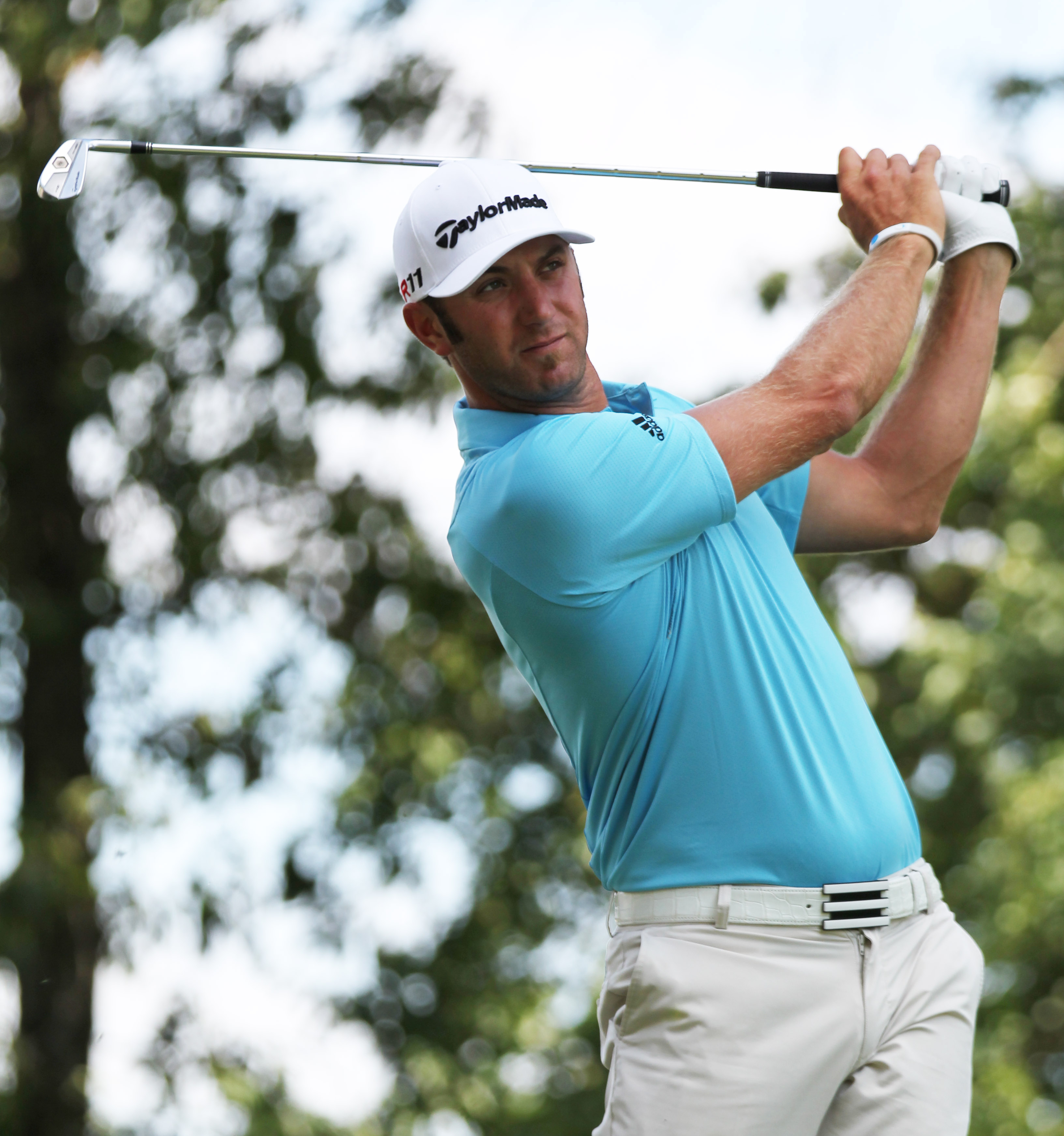
Dustin Johnson's 135 weeks spent atop the world rankings are the 4th most of all time.

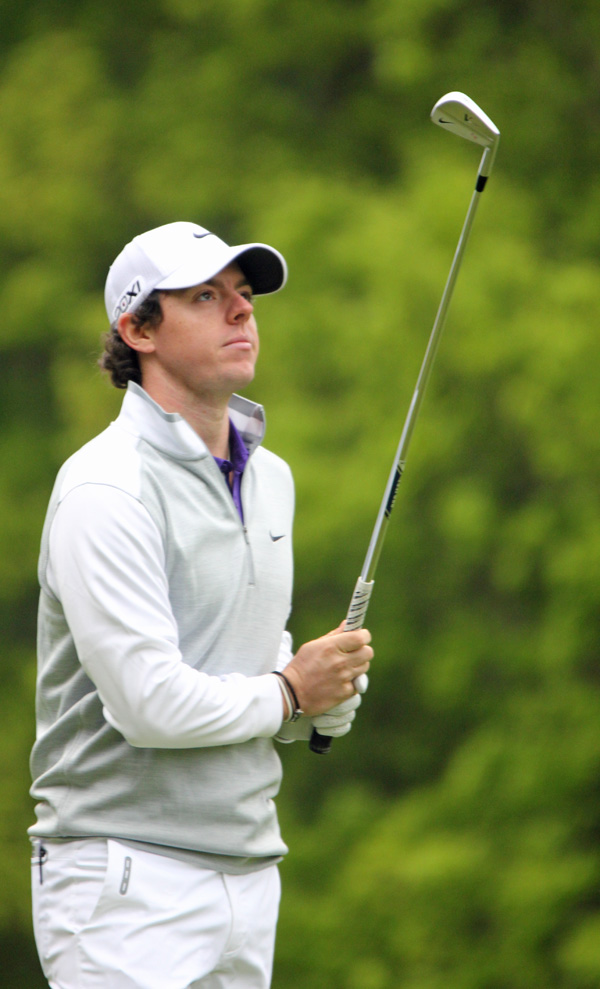
Rory McIlroy was the world No. 1 for 95 weeks in the 2010s, the most of any golfer.

*	Current number one player as of 22 November 2026

#	Country	Player	Start date	End date	Number of weeks	Cumulative total weeks	Ref.
1	West Germany	Bernhard Langer	6 April 1986	26 April 1986	3	**3**	
2	Spain	Seve Ballesteros	27 April 1986	13 September 1986	20	20	
3	Australia	Greg Norman	14 September 1986	21 November 1987	62	62	
	Spain	Seve Ballesteros (2)	22 November 1987	28 November 1987	1	21	
	Australia	Greg Norman (2)	29 November 1987	29 October 1988	48	110	
	Spain	Seve Ballesteros (3)	30 October 1988	5 November 1988	1	22	
	Australia	Greg Norman (3)	6 November 1988	12 November 1988	1	111	
	Spain	Seve Ballesteros (4)	13 November 1988	25 March 1989	19	41	
	Australia	Greg Norman (4)	26 March 1989	1 April 1989	1	112	
	Spain	Seve Ballesteros (5)	2 April 1989	19 August 1989	20	**61**	
	Australia	Greg Norman (5)	20 August 1989	1 September 1990	54	166	
4	England	Nick Faldo	2 September 1990	13 October 1990	6	6	
	Australia	Greg Norman (6)	14 October 1990	2 February 1991	16	182	
	England	Nick Faldo (2)	3 February 1991	6 April 1991	9	15	
5	Wales	Ian Woosnam	7 April 1991	21 March 1992	50	**50**	
6	United States	Fred Couples	22 March 1992	28 March 1992	1	1	
	England	Nick Faldo (3)	29 March 1992	4 April 1992	1	16	
	United States	Fred Couples (2)	5 April 1992	18 July 1992	15	**16**	
	England	Nick Faldo (4)	19 July 1992	5 February 1994	81	**97**	
	Australia	Greg Norman (7)	6 February 1994	13 August 1994	27	209	
7	Zimbabwe	Nick Price	14 August 1994	17 June 1995	44	**44**	
	Australia	Greg Norman (8)	18 June 1995	19 April 1997	96	305	
8	United States	Tom Lehman	20 April 1997	26 April 1997	1	**1**	
	Australia	Greg Norman (9)	27 April 1997	14 June 1997	7	312	
9	United States	Tiger Woods	15 June 1997	21 June 1997	1	1	
10	South Africa	Ernie Els	22 June 1997	28 June 1997	1	1	
	Australia	Greg Norman (10)	29 June 1997	5 July 1997	1	313	
	United States	Tiger Woods (2)	6 July 1997	6 September 1997	9	10	
	Australia	Greg Norman (11)	7 September 1997	10 January 1998	18	**331**	
	United States	Tiger Woods (3)	11 January 1998	11 April 1998	13	23	
	South Africa	Ernie Els (2)	12 April 1998	9 May 1998	4	5	
	United States	Tiger Woods (4)	10 May 1998	16 May 1998	1	24	
	South Africa	Ernie Els (3)	17 May 1998	13 June 1998	4	**9**	
	United States	Tiger Woods (5)	14 June 1998	27 March 1999	41	65	
11	United States	David Duval	28 March 1999	3 July 1999	14	14	
	United States	Tiger Woods (6)	4 July 1999	7 August 1999	5	70	
	United States	David Duval (2)	8 August 1999	14 August 1999	1	**15**	
	United States	Tiger Woods (7)	15 August 1999	4 September 2004	264	334	
12	Fiji	Vijay Singh	5 September 2004	5 March 2005	26	26	
	United States	Tiger Woods (8)	6 March 2005	19 March 2005	2	336	
	Fiji	Vijay Singh (2)	20 March 2005	9 April 2005	3	29	
	United States	Tiger Woods (9)	10 April 2005	21 May 2005	6	342	
	Fiji	Vijay Singh (3)	22 May 2005	11 June 2005	3	**32**	
	United States	Tiger Woods (10)	12 June 2005	30 October 2010	281 (record)	623	
13	England	Lee Westwood	31 October 2010	26 February 2011	17	17	
14	Germany	Martin Kaymer	27 February 2011	23 April 2011	8	**8**	
	England	Lee Westwood (2)	24 April 2011	28 May 2011	5	**22**	
15	England	Luke Donald	29 May 2011	3 March 2012	40	40	
16	Northern Ireland	Rory McIlroy	4 March 2012	17 March 2012	2	2	
	England	Luke Donald (2)	18 March 2012	14 April 2012	4	44	
	Northern Ireland	Rory McIlroy (2)	15 April 2012	28 April 2012	2	4	
	England	Luke Donald (3)	29 April 2012	5 May 2012	1	45	
	Northern Ireland	Rory McIlroy (3)	6 May 2012	26 May 2012	3	7	
	England	Luke Donald (4)	27 May 2012	11 August 2012	11	**56**	
	Northern Ireland	Rory McIlroy (4)	12 August 2012	24 March 2013	32	39	
	United States	Tiger Woods (11)	25 March 2013	17 May 2014	60	**683** (record)	
17	Australia	Adam Scott	18 May 2014	2 August 2014	11	**11**	
	Northern Ireland	Rory McIlroy (5)	3 August 2014	15 August 2015	54	93	
18	United States	Jordan Spieth	16 August 2015	29 August 2015	2	2	
	Northern Ireland	Rory McIlroy (6)	30 August 2015	5 September 2015	1	94	
	United States	Jordan Spieth (2)	6 September 2015	12 September 2015	1	3	
	Northern Ireland	Rory McIlroy (7)	13 September 2015	19 September 2015	1	95	
19	Australia	Jason Day	20 September 2015	26 September 2015	1	1	
	United States	Jordan Spieth (3)	27 September 2015	17 October 2015	3	6	
	Australia	Jason Day (2)	18 October 2015	7 November 2015	3	4	
	United States	Jordan Spieth (4)	8 November 2015	26 March 2016	20	**26**	
	Australia	Jason Day (3)	27 March 2016	18 February 2017	47	**51**	
20	United States	Dustin Johnson	19 February 2017	12 May 2018	64	64	
21	United States	Justin Thomas	13 May 2018	9 June 2018	4	4	
	United States	Dustin Johnson (2)	10 June 2018	9 September 2018	13	77	
22	England	Justin Rose	10 September 2018	22 September 2018	2	2	
	United States	Dustin Johnson (3)	23 September 2018	20 October 2018	4	81	
23	United States	Brooks Koepka	21 October 2018	3 November 2018	2	2	
	England	Justin Rose (2)	4 November 2018	10 November 2018	1	3	
	United States	Brooks Koepka (2)	11 November 2018	17 November 2018	1	3	
	England	Justin Rose (3)	18 November 2018	24 November 2018	1	4	
	United States	Brooks Koepka (3)	25 November 2018	5 January 2019	6	9	
	England	Justin Rose (4)	6 January 2019	2 March 2019	8	12	
	United States	Dustin Johnson (4)	3 March 2019	6 April 2019	5	86	
	England	Justin Rose (5)	7 April 2019	13 April 2019	1	**13**	
	United States	Dustin Johnson (5)	14 April 2019	18 May 2019	5	91	
	United States	Brooks Koepka (4)	19 May 2019	8 February 2020	38	**47**	
	Northern Ireland	Rory McIlroy (8)	9 February 2020	18 July 2020	11 (Note: The rankings were frozen during the COVID-19 pandemic. Rankings were produced on March 15, 2020 and restarted on June 14, 2020. No rankings were produced for the 12 weeks between these dates and so Rory McIlroy's total weeks at number one do not include these 12 weeks.)	106	
24	Spain	Jon Rahm	19 July 2020	1 August 2020	2	2	
	United States	Justin Thomas (2)	2 August 2020	8 August 2020	1	**5**	
	Spain	Jon Rahm (2)	9 August 2020	22 August 2020	2	4	
	United States	Dustin Johnson (6)	23 August 2020	19 June 2021	43	134	
	Spain	Jon Rahm (3)	20 June 2021	10 July 2021	3	7	
	United States	Dustin Johnson (7)	11 July 2021	17 July 2021	1	**135**	
	Spain	Jon Rahm (4)	18 July 2021	26 March 2022	36	43	
25	United States	Scottie Scheffler	27 March 2022	22 October 2022	30	30	
	Northern Ireland	Rory McIlroy (9)	23 October 2022	11 February 2023	16	**122**	
	United States	Scottie Scheffler (2)	12 February 2023	18 February 2023	1	31	
	Spain	Jon Rahm (5)	19 February 2023	11 March 2023	3	46	
	United States	Scottie Scheffler (3)	12 March 2023	8 April 2023	4	35	
	Spain	Jon Rahm (6)	9 April 2023	20 May 2023	6	**52**	
	United States	Scottie Scheffler (4)*	21 May 2023	Present	184	**219**	

== Weeks at number one ==
*	Current number one player as of 22 November 2026

Rank	Player	Weeks	Order	Majors
1	(United States) Tiger Woods	683	9	15
2	(Australia) Greg Norman	331	3	2
3	(United States) Scottie Scheffler*	219	25	4
4	(United States) Dustin Johnson	135	20	2
5	(Northern Ireland) Rory McIlroy	122	16	6
6	(England) Nick Faldo	97	4	6
7	(Spain) Seve Ballesteros	61	2	5
8	(England) Luke Donald	56	15	0
9	(Spain) Jon Rahm	52	24	2
10	(Australia) Jason Day	51	19	1
11	(Wales) Ian Woosnam	50	5	1
12	(United States) Brooks Koepka	47	23	5
13	(Zimbabwe) Nick Price	44	7	3
14	(Fiji) Vijay Singh	32	12	3
15	(United States) Jordan Spieth	26	18	3
16	(England) Lee Westwood	22	13	0
17	(United States) Fred Couples	16	6	1
18	(United States) David Duval	15	11	1
19	(England) Justin Rose	13	22	1
20	(Australia) Adam Scott	11	17	1
21	(South Africa) Ernie Els	9	10	4
22	(Germany) Martin Kaymer	8	14	2
23	(United States) Justin Thomas	5	21	2
24	(West Germany) Bernhard Langer	3	1	2
25	(United States) Tom Lehman	1	8	1

Order – indicates the sequence in which the players first reached number 1.
Majors – number of major championships each player has won throughout his golfing career.

=== Consecutive weeks at No. 1 ===
*	Current number one player as of 22 November 2026

No.1	Player	Weeks
1	(United States) Tiger Woods	281
2	(United States) Tiger Woods (2)	264
3	(United States) Scottie Scheffler*	184
4	(Australia) Greg Norman	96
5	(England) Nick Faldo	81
6	(United States) Dustin Johnson	64
7	(Australia) Greg Norman (2)	62
8	(United States) Tiger Woods (3)	60
9	(Australia) Greg Norman (3)	54
9	(Northern Ireland) Rory McIlroy	54
11	(Wales) Ian Woosnam	50
12	(Australia) Greg Norman (4)	48
13	(Australia) Jason Day	47
14	(Zimbabwe) Nick Price	44
15	(United States) Dustin Johnson (2)	43
16	(United States) Tiger Woods (4)	41
17	(England) Luke Donald	40
18	(United States) Brooks Koepka	38
19	(Spain) Jon Rahm	36
20	(Northern Ireland) Rory McIlroy (2)	32

== Weeks at number one by country ==
*	Country with the current number one player as of 22 November 2026

Rank	Country	Weeks	Order	Majors	Players	Top player	First player	Latest player
1	United States*	1,146	6	34	9	Tiger Woods	Fred Couples	Scottie Scheffler
2	Australia	393	3	4	3	Greg Norman	Greg Norman	Jason Day
3	England	188	4	7	4	Nick Faldo	Nick Faldo	Justin Rose
4	Northern Ireland	122	10	6	1	Rory McIlroy		
5	Spain	113	2	7	2	Seve Ballesteros	Seve Ballesteros	Jon Rahm
6	Wales	50	5	1	1	Ian Woosnam		
7	Zimbabwe	44	7	3	1	Nick Price		
8	Fiji	32	9	3	1	Vijay Singh		
9	Germany (including West Germany)	11	1	4	2	Martin Kaymer	Bernhard Langer	Martin Kaymer
10	South Africa	9	8	4	1	Ernie Els		

Order – indicates the sequence in which the country first had a number 1 player.
Majors – number of major championships the country's world-ranked number 1 players have won throughout their golfing careers.
Players – number of players from that country who have been world-ranked number 1.
Top player – the player from that country who has spent most weeks as the world-ranked number 1 player.
First player – the player from that country who was first to be world-ranked number 1 player, left blank if that country has only one such player.
Latest player – the player from that country who was most recently world-ranked number 1 player, left blank if that country has only one such player.

== Earlier number ones ==
Before the start of the Official World Golf Ranking in 1986, unofficial end of year world golf rankings were published by Mark McCormack in his World of Professional Golf annual from 1968 to 1985. McCormack's rankings listed Jack Nicklaus as the number one from 1968 to 1977, Tom Watson from 1978 to 1982 and Seve Ballesteros from 1983 to 1985.

== See also ==
- List of male golfers who have been in the world top 10
