= Archery at the 2019 Military World Games =

- Venues: Caidian National Defense Park Archery Field
- Dates: 20–24 October

Archery competitions at the 2019 Military World Games were held in Wuhan, China from 20 to 24 October 2019.

== Medal summary ==
=== Medalists ===
==== Recurve ====
Event	Gold	Silver	Bronze
Men's individual	Marco Galiazzo; Italy	Lee Woo-seok; South Korea	Qi Kaiyao; China
Men's team	China (CHN); Feng Hao; Qi Kaiyao; Wang Yan	Italy (ITA); Marco Galiazzo; Mauro Nespoli; David Pasqualucci	South Korea (KOR); Suk Jun-hee; Lee Seung-shin; Lee Woo-seok
Women's individual	Elena Richter; Germany	Sylwia Zyzańska; Poland	Inna Stepanova; Russia
Women's team	Belarus (BLR); Karyna Dziominskaya; Karyna Kazlouskaya; Aliaksandra Kuratnik	Russia (RUS); Viktoriia Budaeva; Elena Osipova; Inna Stepanova	North Korea (PRK); Pak Hyang-sun; Ri Ji-hyang; Kang Un-ju
Mixed team	Russia (RUS); Inna Stepanova; Erdem Tsydypov	China (CHN); Zheng Yichai; Feng Hao	France (FRA); Mélanie Gaubil; Thomas Chirault

==== Para Recurve (demonstration) ====
Event	Gold	Silver	Bronze
Disabled men's individual	Fabio Tomasulo; Italy	Fabian Frily; France	Eugen Pătru; Romania
Disabled women's individual	Linda Coyac; France	Catherine Denarie; France	Rose-Marie Maya; France
Recurve mixed team (valid and disabled)	Brazil (BRA); Juan Urrejola; Marcus Vinicius D'Almeida	Italy (ITA); Fabio Tomasulo; Mauro Nespoli	France (FRA); Eric Baudrit; Thomas Chirault

=== Medal standings ===
* Host nation (China)

Rank	Nation	Gold	Silver	Bronze	Total
1	China (CHN)*	1	1	1	3
1	Russia (RUS)	1	1	1	3
3	Italy (ITA)	1	1	0	2
4	Belarus (BLR)	1	0	0	1
4	Germany (GER)	1	0	0	1
6	South Korea (KOR)	0	1	1	2
7	Poland (POL)	0	1	0	1
8	France (FRA)	0	0	1	1
8	North Korea (PRK)	0	0	1	1
Totals (9 entries)		5	5	5	15

=== Demonstration medal standings ===
The medals in demonstration sport: Para Archery were awarded to these countries. However, they were not included in the official medal standings.

Rank	Nation	Gold	Silver	Bronze	Total
1	France (FRA)	1	2	2	5
2	Italy (ITA)	1	1	0	2
3	Brazil (BRA)	1	0	0	1
4	Romania (ROU)	0	0	1	1
Totals (4 entries)		3	3	3	9
