= Shooting at the 2019 Military World Games =

- Dates: 19–25 October

Shooting at the 2019 Military World Games was held in Wuhan, China from 19 to 25 October 2019.

== Medal summary ==
=== Men ===
Event	Gold	Silver	Bronze
25m Military Rapid Fire Pistol Individual	Leonid Ekimov; Russia	Pavlo Korostylov; Ukraine	Tomáš Těhan; Czech Republic
25m Military Rapid Fire Pistol Team	China; Xie Zhenxiang; Jin Yongde; Yao Zhaonan	Russia; Alexei Klimov; Leonid Ekimov; Anton Guryanov	North Korea; Ryu Kum-il; Kim Hyon-ung; Han Wi-chol
25m Center Fire Pistol Individual	Pavlo Korostylov; Ukraine	Yao Zhaonan; China	Gurpreet Singh; India
25m Center Fire Pistol Team	China; Yao Zhaonan; Jin Yongde; Gao Yongde	South Korea; Koh Eun-suk; Park Jun-woo; Kim Jin-il	Ukraine; Pavlo Korostylov; Yurii Kolesnyk; Oleksandr Petriv
300m Standard Rifle 3 Positions Individual	Hui Zicheng; China	Ole Magnus Bakken; Norway	Robert Markoja; Slovenia
300m Standard Rifle 3 Positions Team	Norway; Ole Magnus Bakken; Kim Andre Aannestad Lund; Hans Kristian Boe Wear	Austria; Bernhard Pickl; Gernot Rumpler; Alexander Schmirl	Switzerland; Jan Lochbihler; Rafael Bereuter; Gilles Vincent Dufaux
300m Military Rapid Fire Rifle Individual	Cao Bo; China	Zhao Zhonghao; China	Jan Lochbihler; Switzerland
300m Military Rapid Fire Rifle Team	China; Zhao Zhonghao; Hui Zicheng; Cao Bo	Finland; Juho Autio; Aleksi Leppä; Juho Kurki	Austria; Gernot Rumpler; Bernhard Pickl; Alexander Schmirl
Shotgun Men Trap Individual	Jaromir Wojtasiewicz; Poland	Aleksey Alipov; Russia	Daniele Resca; Italy
Shotgun Men Trap Team	China; Xia Wei; Yu Xiaokai; Guo Yuhao	Poland; Jaromir Wojtasiewicz; Tomasz Pasierbski; Piotr Kowalczyk	Russia; Aleksey Alipov; Maksim Smykov; Maxim Kabatskiy
Shotgun Men Skeet Individual	Wang Yang; China	Cristian Ciccotti; Italy	Anton Astakhov; Russia
Shotgun Men Skeet Team	Russia; Alexander Zemlin; Anton Astakhov; Aleksei Skorobogatov	Finland; Oskari Kössi; Eetu Kallioinen; Tomi Aspholm	Italy; Cristian Ciccotti; Valerio Andreoni; Emanuele Fuso

=== Women ===
Event	Gold	Silver	Bronze
25m Pistol Women Individual	Sandra Stanja Reitz; Germany	Xiong Yaxuan; China	Naphaswan Yangpaiboon; Thailand
25m Military Rapid Fire Pistol Women Individual	Otryadyn Gündegmaa; Mongolia	Gantömöriin Kherlentsetseg; Mongolia	Lin Yuemei; China
25m Military Rapid Fire Pistol Women Team	China; Zhang Mengyuan; Xiong Yaxuan; Yao Yushi	North Korea; Kang Un-byol; Pak Hyon-gyong; Ri Su-rim	Poland; Agnieszka Korejwo; Agata Nowak; Joanna Tomala
25m Pistol Women Team	China; Xiong Yaxuan; Zhang Mengyuan; Lin Yuemei	South Korea; Park Hyun-joo; Kang Gyu-jeong; Jang Eun-ja	Germany; Doreen Vennekamp; Sandra Stanja Reitz; Michelle Skeries
50m Rifle 3 Positions Women Individual	Yulia Zykova; Russia	Jeanette Hegg Duestad; Norway	Sanja Vukašinović; Serbia
50m Rifle 3 Positions Women Team	Russia; Yulia Karimova; Yulia Zykova; Polina Khorosheva	Ukraine; Nataliia Kalnysh; Lesia Leskiv; Anna Ilina	Norway; Jeanette Hegg Duestad; Katrine Aannestad Lund; Oda Bardseng Lovseth
50m Rifle Prone Women Team	Ukraine; Nataliia Kalnysh; Lesia Leskiv; Anna Ilina	Norway; Jeanette Hegg Duestad; Katrine Aannestad Lund; Oda Bardseng Lovseth	China; Wang Xiangyan; Zhang Binbin; Xu Hong
Shotgun Women Trap Individual	Li Qingnian; China	Federica Caporuscio; Italy	Deng Weiyun; China
Shotgun Women Trap Team	China; Wang Xiaojing; Deng Weiyun; Li Qingnian	Italy; Alessia Iezzi; Federica Caporuscio; Isabella Cristiani	Russia; Tatiana Barsuk; Iuliia Saveleva; Iuliia Tugolukova
Shotgun Women Skeet Individual	Chen Xiaoyao; China	Che Yufei; China	Anastasia Krakhmaleva; Russia
Shotgun Women Skeet Team	China; Chen Xiaoyao; Che Yufei; Zhang Heng	Russia; Anastasia Krakhmaleva; Marina Belikova; Natalia Vinogradova	Thailand; Isarapa Imprasertsuk; Nutchaya Sutarporn; Chalalai Nasakul

=== Mixed ===
Event	Gold	Silver	Bronze
Trap Mixed Team	Italy; Alessia Iezzi; Daniele Resca	Italy; Federica Caporuscio; Antonino Barillà	Russia; Iuliia Tugolukova; Aleksey Alipov
