= India at the 2019 Military World Games =

- IOC code: IND

in Wuhan, China 18 October - 27 October
- Competitors: 54 in 9 sports
- Medals Ranked 27th: Gold 6 Silver 1 Bronze 2 Total 9

Military World Games appearances
- 1995; 1999; 2003; 2007; 2011; 2015; 2019; 2023

India competed at the 2019 Military World Games in Wuhan from 18 to 27 October 2019. It sent a delegation consisting of 54 athletes competing in nine sports for the event.

== Participants ==
Sport	Men	Women	Total
Archery	4	0	4
Diving	2	0	2
Modern pentathlon	1	0	1
Boxing	10	0	10
Artistic gymnastics	4	0	4
Wrestling	5	0	5
Tennis	3	0	3
Track and field	17	0	17
Shooting	8	0	8

=== Medal by sports ===
Medals by sport
Sport	1st place, gold medalist(s)	2nd place, silver medalist(s)	3rd place, bronze medalist(s)	Total
Athletics	1+5	0	0	6
Shooting	0	1	1	2
Shooting	0	0	1	1
Tennis	0	0	1	1

5 para athletics gold and one bronze tennis not counted at medal table because of demonstration sports.

== Medalists ==
Medal	Name	Sport	Event
Gold	Shivpal Singh	Track and field	men's javelin throw
Gold	ANEESH KUMAR SURENDRAN PILLAI	Track and field	
Gold	VIRENDER	Track and field	
Gold	Anandan Gunasekaran	Track and field	men's disabled 100m
Gold	Anandan Gunasekaran	Track and field	men's disabled 200m
Gold	Anandan Gunasekaran	Track and field	men's disabled 400m
Silver	DEEPAK	Boxing	
Bronze	CHIRAG	Boxing	
Bronze	Gurpreet Singh	Shooting	men's 25m center fire pistol
Bronze	Sriram Balaji	Tennis	men's singles
