= Boxing at the 2019 Military World Games =

- Dates: 23–26 October

Boxing at the 2019 Military World Games was held in Wuhan, China from 23 to 26 October 2019.

== Medal summary ==
=== Men ===
| Event | Gold | Silver | Bronze |
|---|---|---|---|
| -49 kg | Temirtas Zhussupov; Kazakhstan | Deepak; India | Kim Jang-ryong; North Korea |
| -49 kg | Temirtas Zhussupov; Kazakhstan | Deepak; India | Salman Alizada; Azerbaijan |
| -52 kg | Zhang Guo; China | Ri Sung-jin; North Korea | Kang Dong-heon; North Korea |
| -52 kg | Zhang Guo; China | Ri Sung-jin; North Korea | Kharkhüügiin Enkhmandakh; Mongolia |
| -56 kg | Ovik Ogannisian; Russia | Kharkhüügiin Enkh-Amar; Mongolia | Chatchai Decha Butdee; Thailand |
| -56 kg | Ovik Ogannisian; Russia | Kharkhüügiin Enkh-Amar; Mongolia | Chirag; India |
| -60 kg | Enzo Grau; France | Shunkor Abdurasulov; Uzbekistan | Choe Chol-man; North Korea |
| -60 kg | Enzo Grau; France | Shunkor Abdurasulov; Uzbekistan | Shakhrier Akhmedov; Russia |
| -64 kg | Dzmitry Asanau; Belarus | Dilmurat Mizhitov; Kazakhstan | Aleksei Mazur; Russia |
| -64 kg | Dzmitry Asanau; Belarus | Dilmurat Mizhitov; Kazakhstan | Yahia Abdelli; Algeria |
| -69 kg | Aslanbek Shymbergenov; Kazakhstan | Bilolbek Mirzarakhimov; Uzbekistan | Saylom Ardee; Thailand |
| -69 kg | Aslanbek Shymbergenov; Kazakhstan | Bilolbek Mirzarakhimov; Uzbekistan | Paul Andreas Wall; Germany |
| -75 kg | Aleksei Semykin; Russia | Hebert Sousa; Brazil | Timur Nurseitov; Kazakhstan |
| -75 kg | Aleksei Semykin; Russia | Hebert Sousa; Brazil | Ahmad Ghossoun; Syria |
| -81 kg | Kozimbek Mardonov; Uzbekistan | Abdelrahman Orabi; Egypt | Narmandakhyn Shinebayar; Mongolia |
| -81 kg | Kozimbek Mardonov; Uzbekistan | Abdelrahman Orabi; Egypt | Ayat Marzhikpayev; Kazakhstan |
| -91 kg | Madiyar Saydrakhimov; Uzbekistan | Abzal Kuttybekov; Kazakhstan | Adrian Buhaniuc; Romania |
| -91 kg | Madiyar Saydrakhimov; Uzbekistan | Abzal Kuttybekov; Kazakhstan | Daniel O'Brien; Ireland |
| +91 kg | Artem Suslenkov; Russia | Mou Haipeng; China | Algirdas Baniulis; Lithuania |
| +91 kg | Artem Suslenkov; Russia | Mou Haipeng; China | Edgar Muñoz; Venezuela |

=== Women ===
| Event | Gold | Silver | Bronze |
|---|---|---|---|
| -51 kg | Wu Yu; China | Pang Chol-mi; North Korea | Trịnh Thị Diễm Kiều; Vietnam |
| -51 kg | Wu Yu; China | Pang Chol-mi; North Korea | Alexandra Kuleshova; Russia |
| -57 kg | Liu Piaopiao; China | Saiana Sagataeva; Russia | Ri Ok-byol; North Korea |
| -57 kg | Liu Piaopiao; China | Saiana Sagataeva; Russia | Claudia Nechita; Romania |
| -60 kg | Xu Zichun; China | Beatriz Ferreira; Brazil | Krisandy Rios; Venezuela |
| -60 kg | Xu Zichun; China | Beatriz Ferreira; Brazil | Choe Hye-song; North Korea |
| -69 kg | Dou Dan; China | Kim Jin-son; North Korea | Bayan Akbayeva; Kazakhstan |
| -69 kg | Dou Dan; China | Kim Jin-son; North Korea | Kimberly Gittens; Barbados |
| -75 kg | Pak Un-sim; North Korea | Zheng Lu; China | Mariia Urakova; Russia |
| -75 kg | Pak Un-sim; North Korea | Zheng Lu; China | Viktoryia Kebikava; Belarus |
