= Taekwondo at the 2019 Military World Games =

- Dates: 23–26 October

Taekwondo at the 2019 Military World Games was held in Wuhan, China from 23 to 26 October 2019.

== Medal summary ==
=== Men ===
Event	Gold	Silver	Bronze
-54 kg	Paulo Melo; Brazil	Iman Akbarzadeh; Iran	Otabek Turganbekov; Uzbekistan
-54 kg	Paulo Melo; Brazil	Iman Akbarzadeh; Iran	Liu Dongdong; China
-58 kg	Ulugbek Rashitov; Uzbekistan	Liang Yushuai; China	Kylian Bonnet; France
-58 kg	Ulugbek Rashitov; Uzbekistan	Liang Yushuai; China	Mohammad Hassan Palangafkan; Iran
-63 kg	Kim Hyeong-woo; South Korea	Dylan Chellamootoo; France	Niyaz Pulatov; Uzbekistan
-63 kg	Kim Hyeong-woo; South Korea	Dylan Chellamootoo; France	Ibrahim Zarman; Indonesia
-68 kg	Edival Pontes; Brazil	Sardor Toirov; Uzbekistan	Mohammad Mehdi Emadi; Iran
-68 kg	Edival Pontes; Brazil	Sardor Toirov; Uzbekistan	Abdelrahman Wael; Egypt
-74 kg	Firas Katoussi; Tunisia	Park Sang-uk; South Korea	Nikita Kriveichenko; Russia
-74 kg	Firas Katoussi; Tunisia	Park Sang-uk; South Korea	Amir Mohammad Bakhshi; Iran
-80 kg	Maksim Khramtsov; Russia	Moisés Hernández; Dominican Republic	Zhang Kai; China
-80 kg	Maksim Khramtsov; Russia	Moisés Hernández; Dominican Republic	Seif Eissa; Egypt
-87 kg	Rafael Kamalov; Russia	Seo Gwang-won; South Korea	Nour Eddine Ziani; Morocco
-87 kg	Rafael Kamalov; Russia	Seo Gwang-won; South Korea	Jordan Stewart; Canada
+87 kg	Ruslan Zhaparov; Kazakhstan	Vladislav Larin; Russia	Tian Jian; China
+87 kg	Ruslan Zhaparov; Kazakhstan	Vladislav Larin; Russia	Cho Min-kwang; South Korea

=== Women ===
Event	Gold	Silver	Bronze
-46 kg	Wu Jiayi; China	Yong Yvette Hui Hua; Canada	Oezlem Gueruez; Germany
-46 kg	Wu Jiayi; China	Yong Yvette Hui Hua; Canada	Anastasiia Artamanova; Russia
-49 kg	Madinabonu Mannopova; Uzbekistan	Nour Abdelsalam; Egypt	Ela Aydin; Germany
-49 kg	Madinabonu Mannopova; Uzbekistan	Nour Abdelsalam; Egypt	Li Zhaoyi; China
-53 kg	Charos Kayumova; Uzbekistan	Roxana Nadja Nothaft; Germany	Wei Xiaojing; China
-53 kg	Charos Kayumova; Uzbekistan	Roxana Nadja Nothaft; Germany	Leonor Saraiva; Brazil
-57 kg	Elena Evlampeva; Russia	Dinorahon Mamadibragimova; Uzbekistan	Anna lena Froemming; Germany
-57 kg	Elena Evlampeva; Russia	Dinorahon Mamadibragimova; Uzbekistan	Zhan Tianrui; China
-62 kg	Song Jie; China	Caroline Santos; Brazil	Feruza Sadikova; Uzbekistan
-62 kg	Song Jie; China	Caroline Santos; Brazil	Ashley Kraayeveld; Canada
-67 kg	Zhang Mengyu; China	Nigora Tursunkulova; Uzbekistan	Anastasia Baklanova; Russia
-67 kg	Zhang Mengyu; China	Nigora Tursunkulova; Uzbekistan	Hedaya Malak; Egypt
-73 kg	Li Chen; China	Vanessa Maria Koerndl; Germany	Maristella Smiraglia; Italy
-73 kg	Li Chen; China	Vanessa Maria Koerndl; Germany	Raiany Fidelis; Brazil
+73 kg	Svetlana Osipova; Uzbekistan	Solène Avoulète; France	Gabriele Cristina Ribesro de Siqueina; Brazil
+73 kg	Svetlana Osipova; Uzbekistan	Solène Avoulète; France	Olga Muzychka; Russia
