= Swimming at the 2019 Military World Games =

- Dates: 19–23 October

Swimming at the 2019 Military World Games was held in Wuhan, China from 19 to 23 October 2019.

== Medal summary ==
=== Men ===
Event	Gold		Silver		Bronze	
50m freestyle	Vladislav Grinev; Russia	22.33	Pedro Spajari; Brazil	22.54	He Junyi; China	22.63
100m freestyle	Vladislav Grinev; Russia	47.86	Pedro Spajari; Brazil	48.75	Kacper Majchrzak; Poland	48.99
200m freestyle	Ji Xinjie; China	1:46.54	Fernando Scheffer; Brazil	1:47.32	Kacper Majchrzak; Poland	1:47.51
400m freestyle	Ji Xinjie; China	3:48.33	Guilherme Costa; Brazil	3:49.37	Sergii Frolov; Ukraine	3:50.73
800m freestyle	Ji Xinjie; China	7:53.65	Sergii Frolov; Ukraine	7:55.15	Marc-Antoine Olivier; France	7:56.51
1500m freestyle	Sergii Frolov; Ukraine	15:01.82	Marc-Antoine Olivier; France	15:09.22	Ji Xinjie; China	15:15.44
50m backstroke	Guilherme Basseto; Brazil	25.34	Jérémy Stravius; France	25.36	Niccolò Bonacchi; Italy Roman Larin; Russia	25.51
100m backstroke	Li Guangyuan; China	54.50	Guilherme Basseto; Brazil	54.70	Roman Larin; Russia	54.90
200m backstroke	Li Guangyuan; China	1:56.88	Radosław Kawęcki; Poland	1:58.75	Wang Shun; China	1:59.17
50m breaststroke	João Gomes Júnior; Brazil	27.07	Yan Zibei; China	27.12	Andrea Toniato; Italy	28.13
100m breaststroke	Anton Chupkov; Russia	59.17	Yan Zibei; China	59.27	Qin Haiyang; China	59.94
200m breaststroke	Anton Chupkov; Russia	2:07.95	Qin Haiyang; China	2:08.41	Mykyta Koptielov; Ukraine	2:14.43
50m butterfly	Oleg Kostin; Russia	22.84	Konrad Czerniak; Poland	23.78	Daniil Pakhomov; Russia	23.82
100m butterfly	Daniil Pakhomov; Russia	52.66	Oleg Kostin; Russia	52.78	Konrad Czerniak; Poland	52.91
200m butterfly	Leonardo de Deus; Brazil	1:56.81	Denys Kesil; Ukraine	1:57.14	Daniil Pakhomov; Russia	1:57.46
200m individual medley	Wang Shun; China	1:56.25	Qin Haiyang; China	1:56.79	Jérémy Desplanches; Switzerland	1:58.76
400m individual medley	Wang Shun; China	4:10.13	Qin Haiyang; China	4:10.41	Dawid Szwedzki; Poland	4:18.35
4 × 100 m freestyle relay	Brazil; Marco Ferreira (49.12); André Calvelo (48.34); Fernando Scheffer (48.57); Pedro Spajari (48.33); Leonardo de Deus^{[a]} Leonardo Santos^{[a]}	3:14.36	China; He Junyi (49.02); Liu Shaofeng (49.72); Wang Shun (48.84); Ji Xinjie (49.55)	3:17.13	Russia; Roman Larin (50.37); Semen Makovich (50.07); Petr Zhikharev (49.79); Vladislav Grinev (47.24); Evgeny Sedov^{[a]} Denis Adeev^{[a]}	3:17.47
4 × 200 m freestyle relay	China; Wang Shun (1:48.05); Liu Shaofeng (1:48.39); He Junyi (1:49.90); Ji Xinjie (1:47.01)	7:13.35	Brazil; Leonardo de Deus (1:50.82); Fernando Scheffer (1:47.88); Leonardo Santos (1:50.08); André Calvelo (1:49.06); Marco Ferreira^{[a]} Guilherme Costa^{[a]}	7:17.84	Poland; Kacper Majchrzak (1:48.08); Filip Zaborowski (1:50.54); Radosław Kawęcki (1:52.24); Jan Hołub (1:50.05)	7:20.91
4 × 100 m medley relay	Russia; Roman Larin (54.98); Anton Chupkov (58.72); Daniil Pakhomov (52.37); Vladislav Grinev (47.50); Oleg Kostin^{[a]} Petr Zhikharev^{[a]} Semen Makovich^{[a]}	3:33.57	China; Li Guangyuan (54.49); Yan Zibei (58.07); Li Zhuhao (52.35); He Junyi (49.53)	3:34.44	Poland; Radosław Kawęcki (55.11); Jan Kalusowski (1:01.23); Konrad Czerniak (52.21); Kacper Majchrzak (48.89); Dawid Szwedzki^{[a]} Michał Poprawa^{[a]} Jan Hołub^{[a]}	3:37.44

^{a} Swimmers who participated in the heats only and received medals.

=== Women ===
Event	Gold		Silver		Bronze	
50m freestyle	Zhu Menghui; China	24.81	Mélanie Henique; France	25.28	Zhang Yufei; China	25.32
100m freestyle	Yang Junxuan; China	53.93	Zhu Menghui; China	53.98	Charlotte Bonnet; France	54.60
200m freestyle	Yang Junxuan; China	1:56.21	Wang Jianjiahe; China	1:58.56	Anastasia Guzhenkova; Russia	1:58.93
400m freestyle	Wang Jianjiahe; China	4:04.42	Zhang Yuhan; China	4:07.29	Anna Egorova; Russia	4:11.40
800m freestyle	Wang Jianjiahe; China	8:24.82	Zhang Yuhan; China	8:31.10	Anna Egorova; Russia	8:32.30
1500m freestyle	Wang Jianjiahe; China	15:57.50	Tjaša Oder; Slovenia	16:25.00	Viviane Jungblut; Brazil	16:29.37
50m backstroke	Chen Jie; China	27.81	Etiene Medeiros; Brazil	28.29	Alicja Tchórz; Poland	28.95
100m backstroke	Chen Jie; China	1:00.14	Liu Yaxin; China	1:01.72	Alicja Tchórz; Poland	1:01.75
200m backstroke	Liu Yaxin; China	2:09.92	Daria Ustinova; Russia	2:10.64	Giulia Ramatelli; Italy	2:13.95
50m breaststroke	Suo Ran; China	30.74	Jhennifer Conceição; Brazil	30.91	Yu Jingyao; China	31.43
100m breaststroke	Yu Jingyao; China	1:07.17	Maria Temnikova; Russia	1:08.25	Jhennifer Conceição; Brazil	1:09.27
200m breaststroke	Yu Jingyao; China	2:23.36	Maria Temnikova; Russia	2:26.05	Alexandra Iwanowska; Poland	2:33.03
50m butterfly	Mélanie Henique; France	25.96	Zhang Yufei; China	26.20	Daiene Dias; Brazil	26.66
100m butterfly	Zhang Yufei; China	58.59	Svetlana Chimrova; Russia	58.81	Daiene Dias; Brazil	59.08
200m butterfly	Zhang Yuhan; China	2:10.68	Svetlana Chimrova; Russia	2:11.09	Zhang Yufei; China	2:12.59
200m individual medley	Fantine Lesaffre; France	2:12.07	Yang Chang; China	2:13.37	Viktoria Beliakova; Russia	2:13.72
400m individual medley	Fantine Lesaffre; France	4:37.91	Nguyễn Thị Ánh Viên; Vietnam	4:44.62	Yang Chang; China	4:46.77
4 × 100 m freestyle relay	China; Zhu Menghui (54.12); Wang Jianjiahe (54.93); Zhang Yufei (55.07); Yang Junxuan (55.45)	3:39.57	Russia; Daria Ustinova (56.85); Irina Krivonogova (55.77); Viktoria Beliakova (55.16); Anastasia Guzhenkova (54.78); Anna Egorova^{[a]} Rozaliya Nasretdinova^{[a]} Alexandra Papusha^{[a]}	3:42.56	Brazil; Larissa Oliveira (54.70); Etiene Medeiros (55.76); Manuella Lyrio (56.58); Daiene Dias (55.92); Gabrielle Roncatto^{[a]} Fernanda de Goeij^{[a]} Viviane Jungblut^{[a]}	3:42.96
4 × 200 m freestyle relay	China; Yang Junxuan (1:57.56); Zhang Yuhan (1:58.12); Zhang Yufei (2:01.89); Wang Jianjiahe (1:59.49)	7:57.06	Russia; Anna Egorova (1:59.76); Irina Krivonogova (2:00.77); Daria Ustinova (2:02.41); Anastasia Guzhenkova (1:59.89)	8:02.83	Brazil; Larissa Oliveira (1:59.29); Manuella Lyrio (2:02.28); Giovanna Diamante (2:03.15); Gabrielle Roncatto (2:03.04)	8:07.76
4 × 100 m medley relay	China; Chen Jie (1:00.50); Yu Jingyao (1:07.49); Zhang Yufei (58.55); Yang Junxuan (53.62)	4:00.16	Russia; Daria Ustinova (1:01.76); Maria Temnikova (1:07.42); Svetlana Chimrova (58.62); Anastasia Guzhenkova (54.94); Alexandra Papusha^{[a]} Viktoria Beliakova^{[a]}	4:02.74	Poland; Alicja Tchórz (1:02.48); Alexandra Iwanowska (1:08.27); Paulina Peda (59.93); Aleksandra Polańska (55.27)	4:05.95

^{a} Swimmers who participated in the heats only and received medals.

=== Mixed ===
Event	Gold		Silver		Bronze	
4 × 100 m freestyle relay	China; Ji Xinjie (49.92); He Junyi (48.50); Zhu Menghui (53.85); Yang Junxuan (53.77)	3:26.04	Russia; Vladislav Grinev (47.78); Petr Zhikharev (49.88); Viktoria Beliakova (55.28); Anastasia Guzhenkova (55.02)	3:27.96	Poland; Kacper Majchrzak (48.80); Konrad Czerniak (48.94); Aleksandra Polańska (55.62); Alicja Tchórz (55.81)	3:29.17
4 × 100 m medley relay	China; Li Guangyuan (54.50); Yan Zibei (58.32); Zhang Yufei (57.77); Yang Junxuan (53.05)	3:43.64	Brazil; Guilherme Basseto (54.93); João Gomes (59.97); Daiene Dias (59.28); Larissa Oliveira (54.54); Leonardo Santos^{[a]} Brandonn Almeida^{[a]} Giovanna Diamante^{[a]} Manuella Lyrio^{[a]}	3:48.72	Russia; Roman Larin (55.01); Maria Temnikova (1:08.03); Svetlana Chimrova (59.14); Vladislav Grinev (47.97); Alexandra Papusha^{[a]} Semen Makovich^{[a]} Viktoria Beliakova^{[a]} Denis Adeev^{[a]}	3:50.15

^{a} Swimmers who participated in the heats only and received medals.

=== Medal table ===
* Host nation (China)

Rank	Nation	Gold	Silver	Bronze	Total
1	China*	27	14	8	49
2	Russia	7	10	10	27
3	Brazil	4	9	6	19
4	France	3	3	2	8
5	Ukraine	1	2	2	5
6	Poland	0	2	11	13
7	Slovenia	0	1	0	1
7	Vietnam	0	1	0	1
9	Italy	0	0	3	3
10	Switzerland	0	0	1	1
Totals (10 entries)		42	42	43	127
