= Judo at the 2019 Military World Games =

- Dates: 19–22 October

Judo at the 2019 Military World Games was held in Wuhan, China from 19 to 22 October 2019.

== Medal summary ==
=== Men ===
Event	Gold	Silver	Bronze
-60 kg	Kim Won-jin; South Korea	Vincent Limare; France	Sukhrob Boqiev; Bahrain
-60 kg	Kim Won-jin; South Korea	Vincent Limare; France	Enkhtaivany Ariunbold; Mongolia
-66 kg	Artyom Shturbabin; Uzbekistan	Mukhriddin Tilovov; Uzbekistan	Jeong Yong-uk; South Korea
-66 kg	Artyom Shturbabin; Uzbekistan	Mukhriddin Tilovov; Uzbekistan	Battogtokhyn Erkhembayar; Mongolia
-73 kg	Khikmatillokh Turaev; Uzbekistan	Sai Yinjirigala; China	Andrea Gismondo; Italy
-73 kg	Khikmatillokh Turaev; Uzbekistan	Sai Yinjirigala; China	Armen Agaian; Russia
-81 kg	Ivaylo Ivanov; Bulgaria	Andrea Regis; Italy	Hidayat Heydarov; Azerbaijan
-81 kg	Ivaylo Ivanov; Bulgaria	Andrea Regis; Italy	Lee Sung-ho; South Korea
-90 kg	Mikhail Igolnikov; Russia	Jung Won-jun; South Korea	Mammadali Mehdiyev; Azerbaijan
-90 kg	Mikhail Igolnikov; Russia	Jung Won-jun; South Korea	Piotr Kuczera; Poland
-100 kg	Daniel Mukete; Belarus	Cédric Olivar; France	Niyaz Ilyasov; Russia
-100 kg	Daniel Mukete; Belarus	Cédric Olivar; France	Leonardo Gonçalves; Brazil
+100 kg	Inal Tasoev; Russia	Bekmurod Oltiboev; Uzbekistan	Anton Brachev; Russia
+100 kg	Inal Tasoev; Russia	Bekmurod Oltiboev; Uzbekistan	David Moura; Brazil

=== Women ===
Event	Gold	Silver	Bronze
-48 kg	Chen Chen; China	Irina Dolgova; Russia	Li Jing; China
-48 kg	Chen Chen; China	Irina Dolgova; Russia	Jon Yu-sun; North Korea
-52 kg	Huang Liru; China	Lan Yu; China	Diyora Keldiyorova; Uzbekistan
-52 kg	Huang Liru; China	Lan Yu; China	Coraline Marcus Tabellion; France
-57 kg	Rafaela Silva; Brazil	Andreea Chițu; Romania	Mariia Skora; Ukraine
-57 kg	Rafaela Silva; Brazil	Andreea Chițu; Romania	Arleta Podolak; Poland
-63 kg	Tang Jing; China	Kamila Badurova; Russia	Ri Pok-hyang; North Korea
-63 kg	Tang Jing; China	Kamila Badurova; Russia	Daria Davydova; Russia
-70 kg	Alena Prokopenko; Russia	Alessandra Prosdocimo; Italy	Eliza Wróblewska; Poland
-70 kg	Alena Prokopenko; Russia	Alessandra Prosdocimo; Italy	Gulnoza Matniyazova; Uzbekistan
-78 kg	Klara Apotekar; Slovenia	Evelin Salánki; Hungary	Vanessa Dureau; France
-78 kg	Klara Apotekar; Slovenia	Evelin Salánki; Hungary	Beata Pacut; Poland
+78 kg	Wang Yan; China	Anamari Velenšek; Slovenia	Beatriz Souza; Brazil
+78 kg	Wang Yan; China	Anamari Velenšek; Slovenia	Li Yang; China

=== Team ===
Event	Gold	Silver	Bronze
Men	Russia; Islam Khametov; Obid Dzhebov; Armen Agaian; Aslan Lappinagov; Alan Khubetsov; Mikhail Igolnikov; Inal Tasoev; Anton Brachev	Brazil; Charles Chibana; Eric Takabatake; Eduardo Katsuhiro; Eduardo Yudy Santos; Rafael Macedo; Eduardo Bettoni; David Moura; Leonardo Goncalves	South Korea; Kim Won-jin; Jeong Yong-uk; Kim Kyeong-hoon; Lee Sung-ho; Jung Won-jun; Mun Kyu-joon; Lee Heon-yong; Kim Seong-jun
Men	Russia; Islam Khametov; Obid Dzhebov; Armen Agaian; Aslan Lappinagov; Alan Khubetsov; Mikhail Igolnikov; Inal Tasoev; Anton Brachev	Brazil; Charles Chibana; Eric Takabatake; Eduardo Katsuhiro; Eduardo Yudy Santos; Rafael Macedo; Eduardo Bettoni; David Moura; Leonardo Goncalves	France; Alister Ward; Julien La Rocca; Quentin Joubert; Kévin Czernik; Cédric Olivar; Joseph Terhec
Women	China; Lan Yu; Chen Chen; Huang Liru; Li Jing; Tang Jing; Yan Zi; Li Yang; Wang Yan	France; Marion Charre; Coraline Marcus Tabellion; Maryline Louis-Sidney; Chloé Yvin; Sylvanie Brisson; Marie Moulin; Vanessa Dureau; Julia Tolofua	Brazil; Eleudis Valentim; Larissa Pimenta; Tamires da Silva; Gabriela Chibana; Alexia Castilhos; Rafaela Silva; Ellen Santana; Samanta Soares; Beatriz Souza
Women	China; Lan Yu; Chen Chen; Huang Liru; Li Jing; Tang Jing; Yan Zi; Li Yang; Wang Yan	France; Marion Charre; Coraline Marcus Tabellion; Maryline Louis-Sidney; Chloé Yvin; Sylvanie Brisson; Marie Moulin; Vanessa Dureau; Julia Tolofua	Poland; Karolina Pieńkowska; Kinga Kubicka; Anna Borowska; Arleta Podolak; Karolina Tałach-Gast; Agata Ozdoba-Błach; Daria Pogorzelec; Eliza Wróblewska; Beata Pacut
