= Orienteering at the 2019 Military World Games =

- Dates: 19–23 October

Orienteering at the 2019 Military World Games was held in Wuhan, China from 19 to 23 October 2019.

== Medal summary ==
=== Men ===
Event	Gold	Silver	Bronze
Individual middle distance	Matthias Kyburz; Switzerland	Florian Howald; Switzerland	Emanuel Egger; Switzerland
Individual long distance race	Dmitrii Tcvetkov; Russia	Frederic Tranchand; France	Ionuț Zincă; Romania
Relay	Switzerland	Russia	France
Team	Switzerland	Russia	Poland

=== Women ===
Event	Gold	Silver	Bronze
Individual middle distance	Anastasiia Rudnaia; Russia	Iuliia Novikova; Russia	Aleksandra Hornik; Poland
Individual long distance	Anastasiia Rudnaia; Russia	Ursula Kadan; Austria	Elena Roos; Switzerland
Relay	Russia	Poland	France
Team	Russia	Poland	France

=== Medal table ===
Source

== Controversy ==
Chinese orienteering teams comprising both men and women counterparts were disqualified and their results were also rejected by the event organizers citing cheating offenses on the athletes for using illegal secret paths and markings with the assistance of spectators to claim medals in the individual middle distance events. China originally claimed a gold and a silver medal in women's category as well as a silver in men's category prior to the disqualification. The issue was later notified by the International Orienteering Federation and announced officially that the medals won't be counted as part of the multi-sport event and clarified on the disqualification of the Chinese athletes.

A common protest was also held by the competitors from Russia, Switzerland, France, Belgium, Poland and Austria accusing the Chinese team for gaining major unfair advantage in the competition.
