= Lifesaving at the 2019 Military World Games =

- Dates: 20–22 October

Lifesaving at the 2019 Military World Games was held in Wuhan, China from 20 to 22 October 2019.

== Medal summary ==
Event	Gold	Silver	Bronze
50m Manikin Carry Women	Wu Huimin; China	Bao Xueyi; China	Priscila de Souza; Brazil
50m Manikin Carry Men	Wojciech Kotowski; Poland	Hubert Nakielski; Poland	Guilherme Rosolen; Brazil
200m Super Lifesaver Women	Dai Xiaodie; China	Mariia Patlasova; Russia	Jessica Grote; Germany
200m Super Lifesaver Men	Niu Yujie; China	Gianni Landi; Italy	Adam Dubiel; Poland
4 x 50m Obstacle Relay Women	China	Russia	Brazil
4 x 50m Obstacle Relay Men	China	Brazil	Poland
100m Rescue Medley Women	Wu Huimin; China	Bao Xueyi; China	Fernanda Andrade; Brazil
100m Rescue Medley Men	Ling Huanan; China	Adam Dubiel; Poland	Nikolai Skvortsov; Russia
100m Manikin Carry with Fins Women	Je Strotkoetter; Germany	Mariia Patlasova; Russia	Vivian Zander; Germany
100m Manikin Carry with Fins Men	Jan Malkowski; Germany	Pavel Kabanov; Russia	Fabian Thorwesten; Germany
4 x 25m Manikin Relay Women	China	Germany	Brazil
4 x 25m Manikin Relay Men	Poland	China	Russia
200m Obstacle Swim Women	Zhang Sishi; China	Qiu Yuhan; China	Carolina Athayde; Brazil
200m Obstacle Swim Men	Hou Yujie; China	Ling Huanan; China	Egenii Kulikov; Russia
100m Manikin Tow with Fins Women	Mariia Patlasova; Russia	Je Strotkoetter; Germany	Vivian Zander; Germany
100m Manikin Tow with Fins Men	Pavel Kabanov; Russia	Jan Malkowski; Germany	Filipe Pereira; Brazil
4 x 50m Medley Relay Women	Brazil	China	Russia
4 x 50m Medley Relay Men	China	Russia	Brazil
