= Cycling at the 2019 Military World Games =

- Dates: 19–21 October

Cycling at the 2019 Military World Games was held in Wuhan, China from 19 to 21 October 2019.

== Medal summary ==
=== Men ===
| Event | Gold | Silver | Bronze |
|---|---|---|---|
| Individual time trial | Anton Vorobyev; Russia | Patrick Gamper; Austria | Jeremy Cabot; France |
| Individual road race | Patrick Haller; Germany | Andris Vosekalns; Latvia | Alexis Bodiot; France |
| Team road race | Latvia | Germany | France |

=== Women ===
| Event | Gold | Silver | Bronze |
|---|---|---|---|
| Individual time trial | Séverine Eraud; France | Juliette Labous; France | Liang Hongyu; China |
| Individual road race | Zhao Xisha; China | Katarzyna Pawłowska; Poland | Pascale Jeuland; France |
| Team road race | China | Poland | France |

=== Medal table ===
* Host nation (China)

| Rank | Nation | Gold | Silver | Bronze | Total |
|---|---|---|---|---|---|
| 1 | China* | 2 | 0 | 1 | 3 |
| 2 | France | 1 | 1 | 5 | 7 |
| 3 | Germany | 1 | 1 | 0 | 2 |
| 3 | Latvia | 1 | 1 | 0 | 2 |
| 5 | Russia | 1 | 0 | 0 | 1 |
| 6 | Poland | 0 | 2 | 0 | 2 |
| 7 | Austria | 0 | 1 | 0 | 1 |
| Totals (7 entries) | | 6 | 6 | 6 | 18 |
