= Sailing at the 2019 Military World Games =

- Dates: 20–22 October

Sailing at the 2019 Military World Games was held in Wuhan, China from 20 to 22 October 2019. Racing was done in the 470 class.

== Medal summary ==
Event	Gold	Silver	Bronze
Women's 470	Poland; Jolanta Ogar; Agnieszka Skrzypulec	France; Camille Lecointre; Aloïse Retornaz	Slovenia; Tina Mrak; Veronika Macarol
Mixed 470	Brazil; Geison Dzioubanov; Ana Barbachan	Russia; Pavel Sozykin; Lyudmila Dmitriyeva	Italy; Giacomo Ferrari; Bianca Caruso
