= Russia at the 2019 Military World Games =

- IOC code: RUS

in Wuhan, China 18 October - 27 October
- Competitors: 243 in 21 sports
- Medals Ranked 2nd: Gold 51 Silver 53 Bronze 57 Total 161

Military World Games appearances
- 1995; 1999; 2003; 2007; 2011; 2015; 2019; 2023

Russia competed at the 2019 Military World Games in Wuhan from 18 to 27 October 2019. It sent a delegation consisting of 243 athletes competing in 21 sports for the event. Russia finished the event with 161 medals, just second behind to tournament hosts China's medal tally of 239.

== Participants ==
Sport	Men	Women	Total
Taekwondo	8	6	14
Diving	5	3	8
Open water	2	0	2
Swimming	9	9	18
Sailing	1	3	4
Parachuting	5	7	12
Orienteering	7	4	11
Naval pentathlon	5	3	8
Modern pentathlon	4	4	8
Military pentathlon	5	4	9
Judo	9	9	18
Fencing	9	9	18
Equestrian	2	1	3
Boxing	11	5	16
Archery	4	4	8
Wrestling	8	4	12
Beach volleyball	4	2	6
Triathlon	6	6	12
Cycling	6	3	9
Track and field	13	8	21
Shooting	13	13	26

== Medal summary ==
=== Medal by sports ===
Medals by sport
Sport	1st place, gold medalist(s)	2nd place, silver medalist(s)	3rd place, bronze medalist(s)	Total
Athletics	3	4	4	11
Archery	1	1	1	3
Boxing	3	1	4	8
Cycling	1	0	0	1
Diving	0	2	5	7
Equestrian	1	0	0	1
Fencing	8	2	2	12
Judo	4	2	4	10
Lifesaving	2	5	4	11
Military pentathlon	0	2	1	3
Modern pentathlon	2	2	0	4
Orienteering	5	3	0	8
Parachuting	0	8	7	15
Sailing	0	1	0	1
Shooting	4	3	5	12
Swimming	7	10	10	27
Taekwondo	3	1	4	8
Beach volleyball	0	0	1	1
Wrestling	5	3	4	12
Open water	0	1	1	2
Triathlon	2	2	0	4
