= Wrestling at the 2019 Military World Games =

- Host city: Wuhan, China
- Dates: 21–24 October

Wrestling at the 2019 Military World Games was held in Wuhan, China from 21 to 24 October 2019.

== Medal table ==
Rank	Nation	Gold	Silver	Bronze	Total
1	Russia	5	3	4	12
2	North Korea	4	0	2	6
3	China	3	1	2	6
4	Iran	2	1	2	5
5	Turkey	2	0	3	5
6	Egypt	1	0	1	2
7	Hungary	1	0	0	1
8	Azerbaijan	0	2	1	3
9	Romania	0	2	0	2
10	Germany	0	1	5	6
11	Belarus	0	1	3	4
12	Kazakhstan	0	1	2	3
12	Poland	0	1	2	3
12	United States	0	1	2	3
15	Mongolia	0	1	1	2
15	Ukraine	0	1	1	2
17	Estonia	0	1	0	1
17	Finland	0	1	0	1
19	Serbia	0	0	2	2
20	Armenia	0	0	1	1
20	Brazil	0	0	1	1
20	South Korea	0	0	1	1
Totals (22 entries)		18	18	36	72

== Medal summary ==
=== Men's freestyle ===
Event	Gold	Silver	Bronze
57 kg	Pak Un-gwang; North Korea	Andrei Dukov; Romania	Max Nowry; United States
57 kg	Pak Un-gwang; North Korea	Andrei Dukov; Romania	Horst Lehr; Germany
65 kg	Gadzhimurad Rashidov; Russia	Vasyl Shuptar; Ukraine	Tian Zhenguang; China
65 kg	Gadzhimurad Rashidov; Russia	Vasyl Shuptar; Ukraine	Selahattin Kılıçsallayan; Turkey
74 kg	Khetag Tsabolov; Russia	Nurkozha Kaipanov; Kazakhstan	Lee Seung-bong; South Korea
74 kg	Khetag Tsabolov; Russia	Nurkozha Kaipanov; Kazakhstan	Soner Demirtaş; Turkey
86 kg	Artur Naifonov; Russia	Ahmed Dudarov; Germany	Mher Markosyan; Armenia
86 kg	Artur Naifonov; Russia	Ahmed Dudarov; Germany	Ahmad Bazri; Iran
97 kg	Mohammad Hossein Mohammadian; Iran	Aliaksandr Hushtyn; Belarus	Vladislav Baitsaev; Russia
97 kg	Mohammad Hossein Mohammadian; Iran	Aliaksandr Hushtyn; Belarus	Fatih Yaşarlı; Turkey
125 kg	Taha Akgül; Turkey	Yadollah Mohebbi; Iran	Deng Zhiwei; China
125 kg	Taha Akgül; Turkey	Yadollah Mohebbi; Iran	Robert Baran; Poland

=== Men's Greco-Roman ===
Event	Gold	Silver	Bronze
60 kg	Ri Se-ung; North Korea	Sergey Emelin; Russia	Ildar Hafizov; United States
60 kg	Ri Se-ung; North Korea	Sergey Emelin; Russia	Aidos Sultangali; Kazakhstan
67 kg	Mohamed Ibrahim El-Sayed; Egypt	Artem Surkov; Russia	Mikayil Rahmanov; Azerbaijan
67 kg	Mohamed Ibrahim El-Sayed; Egypt	Artem Surkov; Russia	Mate Nemeš; Serbia
77 kg	Pejman Poshtam; Iran	Hasan Aliyev; Azerbaijan	Florian Neumaier; Germany
77 kg	Pejman Poshtam; Iran	Hasan Aliyev; Azerbaijan	Viktor Nemeš; Serbia
87 kg	Viktor Lőrincz; Hungary	Rafig Huseynov; Azerbaijan	Evgeny Saleev; Russia
87 kg	Viktor Lőrincz; Hungary	Rafig Huseynov; Azerbaijan	Denis Kudla; Germany
97 kg	Musa Evloev; Russia	Elias Kuosmanen; Finland	Aliaksandr Hrabovik; Belarus
97 kg	Musa Evloev; Russia	Elias Kuosmanen; Finland	Oliver Hassler; Germany
130 kg	Rıza Kayaalp; Turkey	Heiki Nabi; Estonia	Amin Mirzazadeh; Iran
130 kg	Rıza Kayaalp; Turkey	Heiki Nabi; Estonia	Abdellatif Mohamed; Egypt

=== Women's freestyle ===
Event	Gold	Silver	Bronze
50 kg	Li Yuyan; China	Whitney Conder; United States	Kim Su-jong; North Korea
50 kg	Li Yuyan; China	Whitney Conder; United States	Kseniya Stankevich; Belarus
53 kg	Yon Jo-hwa; North Korea	Suzanna Șeicariu; Romania	Nina Hemmer; Germany
53 kg	Yon Jo-hwa; North Korea	Suzanna Șeicariu; Romania	Milana Dadasheva; Russia
57 kg	Li Hui; China	Sükheegiin Tserenchimed; Mongolia	Katarzyna Krawczyk; Poland
57 kg	Li Hui; China	Sükheegiin Tserenchimed; Mongolia	Jong Myong-suk; North Korea
62 kg	Mun Hyon-gyong; North Korea	Maria Kuznetsova; Russia	Anastasiya Huchok; Belarus
62 kg	Mun Hyon-gyong; North Korea	Maria Kuznetsova; Russia	Laís Nunes; Brazil
68 kg	Zhou Feng; China	Agnieszka Wieszczek; Poland	Enkh-Amaryn Davaanasan; Mongolia
68 kg	Zhou Feng; China	Agnieszka Wieszczek; Poland	Khanum Velieva; Russia
76 kg	Natalia Vorobieva; Russia	Wang Juan; China	Gulmaral Yerkebayeva; Kazakhstan
76 kg	Natalia Vorobieva; Russia	Wang Juan; China	Alla Belinska; Ukraine
