= South Korea at the 2019 Military World Games =

- Flag of South Korea
- IOC code: KOR

in Wuhan, China 18 October 2019 – 27 October 2019
- Medals Ranked 16th: Gold 3 Silver 10 Bronze 11 Total 24

Military World Games appearances
- 1995; 1999; 2003; 2007; 2011; 2015; 2019; 2023

South Korea competed at the 2019 Military World Games held in Wuhan, China from 18 to 27 October 2019. According to the official results athletes representing South Korea won three gold medals, 10 silver medals and 11 bronze medals; instead, the medal count appears to be 21 rather than 24 (see below). The country finished in 16th place in the medal table.

== Medal summary ==
=== Medal by sports ===
Medals by sport
| Sport | 1st place, gold medalist(s) | 2nd place, silver medalist(s) | 3rd place, bronze medalist(s) | Total |
|---|---|---|---|---|
| Archery | 0 | 1 | 1 | 2 |
| Badminton | 1 | 0 | 1 | 2 |
| Fencing | 0 | 0 | 2 | 2 |
| Judo | 1 | 1 | 3 | 5 |
| Modern pentathlon | 0 | 2 | 0 | 2 |
| Shooting | 0 | 2 | 0 | 2 |
| Taekwondo | 1 | 2 | 1 | 4 |
| Volleyball | 0 | 1 | 0 | 1 |
| Wrestling | 0 | 0 | 1 | 1 |

=== Medalists ===
| Medal | Name | Sport | Event |
|---|---|---|---|
| Gold | Heo Kwang-hee | Badminton | Men's singles |
| Gold | Kim Won-jin | Judo | Men's -60 kg |
| Gold | Kim Hyeong-woo | Taekwondo | Men's -63 kg |
| Silver | Lee Woo-seok | Archery | Men's individual |
| Silver | Jung Won Joon | Judo | Men's -90 kg |
| Silver | Lee Jihun | Modern pentathlon | Men individual |
| Silver | Men's team | Modern pentathlon | Men team |
| Silver | Koh Eun-suk; Park Jun-woo; Kim Jin-il | Shooting | Men's 25m Center Fire Pistol Team |
| Silver | Park Hyun-joo; Kang Gyu-jeong; Jang Eun-ja | Shooting | Women's 25m Pistol Women Team |
| Silver | Park Sang-uk | Taekwondo | Men's -74 kg |
| Silver | Seo Gwang-won | Taekwondo | Men's -87 kg |
| Silver | Men's team | Volleyball | Men's tournament |
| Bronze | Suk Jun-hee; Lee Seung-shin; Lee Woo-seok | Archery | Men's team |
| Bronze | Men's team | Badminton | Men team |
| Bronze | Hwang Hyeon-il | Fencing | Men's Individual Épée |
| Bronze | Hwang Hyeon-il; Jung Byeung-chan; Ma Se-gon | Fencing | Men's Team Épée |
| Bronze | Jeong Yong-uk | Judo | Men's -66 kg |
| Bronze | Lee Sung-ho | Judo | Men's -81 kg |
| Bronze | Kim Won-jin; Jeong Yong Uk; Kim Kyeong Hoon; Lee Sung Ho; Jung Won Joon; Mun Kyu Joon; Lee Heon Yong; Kim Seong Jun | Judo | Men's team |
| Bronze | Cho Min-kwang | Taekwondo | Men's +87 kg |
| Bronze | Lee Seung-bong | Wrestling | Men's freestyle 74 kg |
