= Ukraine at the 2019 Military World Games =

- Flag of Ukraine
- IOC code: UKR

in Wuhan, China 18 October 2019 – 27 October 2019
- Medals Ranked 10th: Gold 5 Silver 13 Bronze 15 Total 33

Military World Games appearances
- 1995; 1999; 2003; 2007; 2011; 2015; 2019; 2023

Ukraine competed at the 2019 Military World Games held in Wuhan, China from 18 to 27 October 2019. According to the official results athletes representing Ukraine won five gold medals, 13 silver medals and 15 bronze medals; instead, the medal count appears to be 32 rather than 33 (see below). The country finished in 10th place in the medal table.

== Medal summary ==
=== Medal by sports ===
Medals by sport
Sport	1st place, gold medalist(s)	2nd place, silver medalist(s)	3rd place, bronze medalist(s)	Total
Athletics	1	6	4	11
Diving	0	1	1	2
Fencing	1	1	3	5
Judo	0	0	1	1
Military pentathlon	0	0	1	1
Shooting	2	2	1	5
Swimming	1	2	2	5
Wrestling	0	1	1	2

=== Medalists ===
Medal	Name	Sport	Event
Gold	Nataliya Pryshchepa	Athletics	Women's 800 metres
Gold	Igor Reizlin	Fencing	Men's individual Epee
Gold	Pavlo Korostylov	Shooting	Men's 25m Center Fire Pistol Individual
Gold	Nataliia Kalnysh; Lesia Leskiv; Anna Ilina	Shooting	Women's 50m Rifle Prone Women Team
Gold	Sergii Frolov	Swimming	Men's 1500m freestyle
Silver	Serhiy Smelyk	Athletics	Men's 200 metres
Silver	Viktor Shumik	Athletics	Men's 20 kilometres walk
Silver	Nataliya Pryshchepa	Athletics	Women's 1500 metres
Silver	Hanna Plotitsyna	Athletics	Women's 100 metres hurdles
Silver	Hanna Ryzhykova	Athletics	Women's 400 metres hurdles
Silver	Yuliya Levchenko	Athletics	Women's high jump
Silver	Oleg Kolodiy; Oleksandr Gorshkovozov	Diving	Men's synchronized 3 m springboard
Silver	Dzhoan Bezhura; Inna Brovko; Alina Komashchuk; Olena Kryvytska	Fencing	Women's team Epee
Silver	Pavlo Korostylov	Shooting	Men's 25m Military Rapid Fire Pistol Individual
Silver	Nataliia Kalnysh; Lesia Leskiv; Anna Ilina	Shooting	Women's 50m Rifle 3 Positions Women Team
Silver	Sergii Frolov	Swimming	Men's 800m freestyle
Silver	Denys Kesil	Swimming	Men's 200m butterfly
Silver	Vasyl Shuptar	Wrestling	Men's freestyle 65 kg
Bronze	Serhiy Budza	Athletics	Men's 50 kilometres walk
Bronze	Hanna Chubkovtsova	Athletics	Women's 100 metres hurdles
Bronze	Mariya Mykolenko; Anastasiia Bryzgina; Kateryna Klymiuk; Hanna Ryzhykova	Athletics	Women's 4 × 400 metres relay
Bronze	Iryna Herashchenko	Athletics	Women's high jump
Bronze	Oleg Kolodiy	Diving	Men's 1 m springboard
Bronze	Oleksii Statsenko; Roman Svichkar; Yuriy Tsap; Andriy Yahodka	Fencing	Men's team Sabre
Bronze	Alina Komashchuk	Fencing	Women's individual Sabre
Bronze	Yuliia Bakastova; Dzhoan Bezhura; Alina Komashchuk; Olena Voronina	Fencing	Women's team Sabre
Bronze	Mariia Skora	Judo	Women's -57 kg
Bronze	Men's team	Military pentathlon	Men obstacle relay
Bronze	Pavlo Korostylov; Yurii Kolesnyk; Oleksandr Petriv	Shooting	Men's 25m Center Fire Pistol Team
Bronze	Sergii Frolov	Swimming	Men's 400m freestyle
Bronze	Mykyta Koptielov	Swimming	Men's 200m breaststroke
Bronze	Alla Belinska	Wrestling	Women's freestyle 76 kg
