= Equestrian events at the 2019 Military World Games =

Equestrian at the 2019 Military World Games
- Dates: 19–21 October

Equestrian events at the 2019 Military World Games were held in Wuhan, China from 19 to 21 October 2019.

== Medal summary ==
Event	Gold	Silver	Bronze
Jumping individual	Emanuele Massimiliano Bianchi; Italy	Claudio Goggia; Brazil	Mao Lixin; China
Jumping team	Mikhail Atoian; Evgenii Terentev; Anastasiia Shcherbakova; Russia	Stefano Nogara; Emanuele Massimiliano Bianchi; Filippo Martini di Cigala; Italy	Benjamin Courtat; Le Grix de la Salle; Chloe Hardy; France
