= Naval pentathlon at the 2019 Military World Games =

- Dates: 23–26 October

Naval pentathlon at the 2019 Military World Games was held in Wuhan, China from 23 to 26 October 2019.

== Medal summary ==
Event	Gold	Silver	Bronze
Men individual	Guo Ziyuan; China	Tiago Lincoln; Brazil	Matthias Wesemann; Germany
Women individual	Zhang Na; China	Li Shun; China	Cecilia Sjoeholm; Sweden
Men team	China	Brazil	Germany
Women team	China	Sweden	Brazil
Men's obstacle relay	China	Brazil	Spain
Women's obstacle relay	China	Finland	Sweden
