= Badminton at the 2019 Military World Games =

- Venues: Wuhan University Students Sports Centre
- Dates: 21–26 October

Badminton at the 2019 Military World Games was held in Wuhan, China, from 21 to 26 October 2019. China dominated as the host nation, winning gold in almost all disciplines.

== Medal summary ==
Event	Gold	Silver	Bronze
Men's singles	Heo Kwang-hee; South Korea	Lu Guangzu; China	Li Shifeng; China
Men's doubles	China; Zhang Nan; Tan Qiang	China; Wang Yilyu; Liu Cheng	Thailand; Nanthakarn Yordphaisong; Inkarat Apisuk
Men team	China; Wang Yilyu; Wu Xin; Zhao Junpeng; Zhang Nan; Tan Qiang; Ju Fangpengyu; Lu Guangzu; Liu Cheng; Li Shifeng	Thailand; Jakkit Tuntirasin; Kittipong Imnark; Nanthakarn Yordphaisong; Prinyawat Thongnuam; Peeranat Boontun; Arkonnit Thaptimdong; Boonsak Ponsana; Inkarat Apisuk; Adulrach Namkul	South Korea; Park Kyung-hoon; Lim Seung-ki; Ra Min-young; Go Kyung-bo; Heo Kwang-hee; Jun Bong-chan; Park Byeong-hun; Kim Dong-ju; Kim Hwi-tae
Women's singles	Zhang Yiman; China	Li Xuerui; China	Li Yun; China
Women's doubles	China; Li Yinhui; Du Yue	China; Zheng Yu; Huang Dongping	China; Chen Mingchun; Gao Ziyao
Mixed doubles	China; Huang Dongping; Wang Yilyu	China; Du Yue; Tan Qiang	China; Li Xuerui; Zhang Nan

== Women's doubles ==
=== Group A ===
Pos	Team	Pld	W	L	GF	GA	GD	PF	PA	PD	Pts	Qualification
1	(China) Du Yue (China) Li Yinhui	2	2	0	0	0	0	0	0	0	2	Advance to gold-medal match
2	(China) Chen Mingchun (China) Gao Ziyao	2	1	1	0	0	0	0	0	0	1	Advance to bronze-medal match
3	(Thailand) Saralee Thungthongkam (Thailand) Duanganong Aroonkesorn	2	0	2	0	0	0	0	0	0	0	

=== Group B ===
Pos	Team	Pld	W	L	GF	GA	GD	PF	PA	PD	Pts	Qualification
1	(China) Huang Dongping (China) Zheng Yu	2	2	0	0	0	0	0	0	0	2	Advance to gold-medal match
2	(Poland) Olga Miksza (Poland) Magdalena Świerczyńska	2	1	1	0	0	0	0	0	0	1	Advance to bronze-medal match
3	(France) Sabrina Priat (France) Séverine Knafel	2	0	2	0	0	0	0	0	0	0	

=== Finals ===
Gold-medal match
A1	(China) Du Yue (China) Li Wenmei	18	21	21
B1	(China) Huang Dongping (China) Zheng Yu	21	17	15
Bronze-medal match
A2	(China) Chen Mingchun (China) Gao Ziyao	21	21
B2	(Poland) Olga Miksza (Poland) Magdalena Świerczyńska	13	7

== Mixed doubles ==
=== Group A ===
Pos	Team	Pld	W	L	GF	GA	GD	PF	PA	PD	Pts	Qualification
1	(China) Wang Yilyu (China) Huang Dongping	4	4	0	0	0	0	0	0	0	4	Advance to gold-medal match
2	(Thailand) Prinyawat Thongnuam (Thailand) Duanganong Aroonkesorn	4	3	1	0	0	0	0	0	0	3	Advance to bronze-medal match
3	(Poland) Adam Cwalina (Poland) Magdalena Świerczyńska	4	2	2	0	0	0	0	0	0	2	
4	(Nepal) Nabin Shrestha (Nepal) Anu Maya Rai	4	1	3	0	0	0	0	0	0	1	
5	(North Korea) Yu Ho-chol (North Korea) Kim Jin-hyang	4	0	4	0	0	0	0	0	0	0	

=== Group B ===
Pos	Team	Pld	W	L	GF	GA	GD	PF	PA	PD	Pts	Qualification
1	(China) Tan Qiang (China) Du Yue	4	4	0	0	0	0	0	0	0	4	Advance to gold-medal match
2	(China) Zhang Nan (China) Li Xuerui	4	3	1	0	0	0	0	0	0	3	Advance to bronze-medal match
3	(Thailand) Inkarat Apisuk (Thailand) Saralee Thungthongkam	4	2	2	0	0	0	0	0	0	2	
4	(France) Nathan Condomines (France) Sabrina Priat	4	1	3	0	0	0	0	0	0	1	
5	(North Korea) Choe Mu-gwang (North Korea) Yu Mi-song	4	0	4	0	0	0	0	0	0	0	

=== Finals ===
Gold-medal match
A1	(China) Wang Yilyu (China) Huang Dongping	21	21
B1	(China) Tan Qiang (China) Du Yue	17	13
Bronze-medal match
B2	(Thailand) Prinyawat Thongnuam (Thailand) Duanganong Aroonkesorn	17	19
A2	(China) Zhang Nan (China) Li Xuerui	21	21

== Men's team ==
=== Standings ===
Pos	Team	Pld	W	L	MF	MA	MD	GF	GA	GD	PF	PA	PD	Pts	
1	China (H)	4	4	0	0	0	0	0	0	0	0	0	0	4	Gold medal
2	Thailand	4	3	1	0	0	0	0	0	0	0	0	0	3	Silver medal
3	South Korea	4	2	2	0	0	0	0	0	0	0	0	0	2	Bronze medal
4	North Korea	4	1	3	0	0	0	0	0	0	0	0	0	1	
5	France	4	0	4	0	0	0	0	0	0	0	0	0	0	

(H) Host

==== North Korea vs China ====
North Korea
0
Wuhan University Students Sports Centre, Court 1
October 2019

China
5

			1	2	3
1	(North Korea) (China)	Choe Mu-gwang; Lu Guangzu	8; 21	9; 21
2	(North Korea) (China)	Ri Sung-gwon / Yu Ho-chol; Zhang Nan / Tan Qiang	7; 21	10; 21
3	(North Korea) (China)	Kim Chung-il; Zhao Junpeng	8; 21	8; 21
4	(North Korea) (China)	Choe Mu-gwang / Hwang Jin; Liu Cheng / Ju Fangpengyu	12; 21	10; 21
5	(North Korea) (China)	Ri Sung-gwon; Li Shifeng	3; 21	6; 21

==== China vs Thailand ====
China
5
Wuhan University Students Sports Centre, Court 1
October 2019

Thailand
0

			1	2	3
1	(China) (Thailand)	Lu Guangzu; Adulrach Namkul	21; 12	21; 11
2	(China) (Thailand)	Zhang Nan / Tan Qiang; Arkornnit Thaptimdong / Jakkit Tuntirasin	21; 15	21; 17
3	(China) (Thailand)	Zhao Junpeng; Peeranat Boontun	21; 17	21; 14
4	(China) (Thailand)	Liu Cheng / Wang Yilyu; Inkarat Apisuk / Nanthakarn Yordphaisong	21; 11	21; 14
5	(China) (Thailand)	Li Shifeng; Kittipong Imnark	21; 16	21; 16

==== China vs South Korea ====
China
5
Wuhan University Students Sports Centre, Court 1
October 2019

South Korea
0

			1	2	3
1	(China) (South Korea)	Zhao Junpeng; Heo Kwang-hee	10; 21	21; 13	21; 14
2	(China) (South Korea)	Zhang Nan / Tan Qiang; Kim Hwi-tae / Park Kyung-hoon	21; 16	20; 22	21; 18
3	(China) (South Korea)	Lu Guangzu; Go Kyung-bo	21; 13	21; 12
4	(China) (South Korea)	Liu Cheng / Wang Yilyu; Jun Bong-chan / Ra Min-young	21; 14	21; 13
5	(China) (South Korea)	Li Shifeng; Lim Seung-ki	21; 15	21; 13

==== France vs China ====
France
0
Wuhan University Students Sports Centre, Court 1
October 2019

China
5

			1	2	3
1	(France) (China)	Quentin Galigne; Wu Xin	13; 21	15; 21
2	(France) (China)	Nathan Condomines; Zhao Junpeng	7; 21	12; 21
3	(France) (China)	Guillaume Villeger; Lu Guangzu	5; 21	8; 21
4	(France) (China)	Guillaume Villeger / Mandrin Mouchet; Zhang Nan / Tan Qiang	12; 21	12; 21
5	(France) (China)	Quentin Galigne / Nathan Condomines; Liu Cheng / Ju Fangpengyu	16; 21	16; 21

==== South Korea vs North Korea ====
South Korea
5
Wuhan University Students Sports Centre, Court 1
October 2019

North Korea
0

			1	2	3
1	(South Korea) (North Korea)	Heo Kwang-hee; Choe Mu-gwang	21; 6	21; 4
2	(South Korea) (North Korea)	Kim Dong-ju / Park Kyung-hoon; Ri Sung-gwon / Yu Ho-chol	21; 7	21; 3
3	(South Korea) (North Korea)	Go Kyung-bo; Kim Chung-il	21; 5	21; 5
4	(South Korea) (North Korea)	Kim Hwi-tae / Jun Bong-chan; Pak Kum-yong / Pak Kum-yong	21; 6	12; 10
5	(South Korea) (North Korea)	Lim Seung-ki; Hwang Jin	21; 17	21; 16
