= Diving at the 2019 Military World Games =

- Venues: Wuhan Sports Center Natatorium
- Dates: 24–27 October

Diving competitions at the 2019 Military World Games were held in Wuhan, China from 24 to 27 October 2019.

== Medal summary ==
=== Medalists ===
==== Men's events ====
Event	Gold	Silver	Bronze
1 m springboard	Wang Zongyuan; China	Ma Depeng; China	Oleg Kolodiy; Ukraine
3 m springboard	Xie Siyi; China	Wang Zongyuan; China	Yury Naurozau; Belarus
10 m platform	Lian Junjie; China	Yuan Song; China	Aleksandr Bondar; Russia
Synchronized 3 m springboard	China (CHN); Wang Zongyuan; Xie Siyi	Ukraine (UKR); Oleg Kolodiy; Oleksandr Gorshkovozov	Italy (ITA); Tommaso Rinaldi; Gabrile Auber
Synchronized 10 m platform	China (CHN); Lian Junjie; Yang Hao	Germany (GER); Lou Massenberg; Timo Barthel	Russia (RUS); Aleksandr Bondar; Sergey Nazin
Men's team	China (CHN); Yuan Song; Xie Siyi; Yang Hao; Peng Jianfeng; Wang Zongyuan; Ma Depeng; Lian Junjie	Germany (GER); Timo Barthel; Nico Herzog; Lou Massenberg; Frithjof Seidel	Brazil (BRA); Isaac Souza; Jackson Rondinelli

==== Women's events ====
Event	Gold	Silver	Bronze
1 m springboard	Huang Xiaohui; China	Chang Yani; China	Kristina Ilinykh; Russia
3 m springboard	Huang Xiaohui; China	Wei Ying; China	Kristina Ilinykh; Russia
10 m platform	Si Yajie; China	Lin Shan; China	Kim Mi-rae; North Korea
Synchronized 3 m springboard	China (CHN); Wei Ying; Huang Xiaohui	Russia (RUS); Kristina Ilinykh; Iuliia Timoshinina	Germany (GER); Jana Lisa Rother; Saskia Oettinghaus
Synchronized 10 m platform	North Korea (PRK); Kim Mi-hwa; Kim Mi-rae	Russia (RUS); Anna Chuinyshena; Iuliia Timoshinina	Brazil (BRA); Tammy Galera; Giovanna Pedroso
Women's team	China (CHN); Huang Xiaohui; Wei Ying; Si Yajie; Yu Ouyang; Hu Jiahan; Lin Shan; Chang Yani	Brazil (BRA); Giovanna Pedroso; Tammy Galera; Luana Lira; Juliana Veloso	Russia (RUS); Iuliia Timoshinina; Anna Chuinyshena; Kristina Ilinykh

=== Medal standings ===
* Host nation (China)

Rank	Nation	Gold	Silver	Bronze	Total
1	China (CHN)*	11	6	0	17
2	North Korea (PRK)	1	0	1	2
3	Russia (RUS)	0	2	5	7
4	Germany (GER)	0	2	1	3
5	Brazil (BRA)	0	1	2	3
6	Ukraine (UKR)	0	1	1	2
7	Belarus (BLR)	0	0	1	1
7	Italy (ITA)	0	0	1	1
Totals (8 entries)		12	12	12	36
