= Artistic gymnastics at the 2019 Military World Games =

- Venues: Hubei Olympic Center Gymnasium
- Dates: 21–26 October

Men's artistic gymnastics events at the 2019 Military World Games were held in Wuhan, China from 21 to 26 October 2019.

== Medal summary ==
=== Medalists ===
Event	Gold	Silver	Bronze
Men
Team all-around	(China) China; Cai Weifeng; Deng Shudi; Huang Mingqi; Liu Yang; Xiao Ruoteng; Zou Jingyuan	(Brazil) Brazil; Francisco Barretto; Lucas Bitencourt; Arthur Mariano; Luís Guilherme Porto; Caio Souza; Arthur Zanetti	(North Korea) North Korea; Kim Chol; Kim Hyok; Ri Kwang-bom; Ri Se-gwang; Ri Wi-chol; Ri Yong-min
Individual all-around	Xiao Ruoteng; China	Deng Shudi; China	Caio Souza; Brazil
Floor exercise	Deng Shudi; China	Xiao Ruoteng; China	Arthur Zanetti; Brazil
Pommel horse	Zou Jingyuan; China	Xiao Ruoteng; China	Francisco Barretto; Brazil
Rings	Liu Yang; China	Arthur Zanetti; Brazil	Artur Avetisyan; Armenia
Vault	Huang Mingqi; China	Kim Chol; North Korea	Ri Se-gwang; North Korea
Parallel bars	Zou Jingyuan; China	Xiao Ruoteng; China	Caio Souza; Brazil
Horizontal bar	Xiao Ruoteng; China	Deng Shudi; China	Francisco Barretto; Brazil

=== Medal standings ===
* Host nation (China)

Rank	Nation	Gold	Silver	Bronze	Total
1	China (CHN)*	8	5	0	13
2	Brazil (BRA)	0	2	5	7
3	North Korea (PRK)	0	1	2	3
4	Armenia (ARM)	0	0	1	1
Totals (4 entries)		8	8	8	24

== Participating nations ==
- Armenia (3)
- Brazil (6)
- China (6)
- India (4)
- North Korea (6)
- Vietnam (2)
