= Fencing at the 2019 Military World Games =

- Dates: 19–24 October

Fencing at the 2019 Military World Games was held in Wuhan, China from 19 to 24 October 2019.

== Medal summary ==
=== Men ===
Event	Gold	Silver	Bronze
Individual Épée	Ihor Reizlin; Ukraine	Alan Fardzinov; Russia	Hwang Hyeon-il; South Korea
Individual Épée	Ihor Reizlin; Ukraine	Alan Fardzinov; Russia	Lucas Malcotti; Switzerland
Team Épée	Italy (ITA); Lorenzo Buzzi; Paolo Pizzo; Matteo Tagliariol	Hungary (HUN); Dániel Berta; András Peterdi; Gergely Siklósi	South Korea (KOR); Hwang Hyeon-il; Jung Byeung-chan; Ma Se-geon
Individual Foil	Timur Safin; Russia	Maxime Pauty; France	Aleksey Cheremisinov; Russia
Individual Foil	Timur Safin; Russia	Maxime Pauty; France	Lorenzo Nista; Italy
Team Foil	Russia (RUS); Aleksey Cheremisinov; Alan Fardzinov; Timur Safin; Dmitry Zherebchenko	France (FRA); Enzo Lefort; Maxime Pauty; Alexandre Sido	Italy (ITA); Valerio Aspromonte; Lorenzo Nista; Damiano Rosatelli
Individual Sabre	Richard Hübers; Germany	Konstantin Lokhanov; Russia	Dario Cavaliere; Italy
Individual Sabre	Richard Hübers; Germany	Konstantin Lokhanov; Russia	Björn Hübner; Germany
Team Sabre	Russia (RUS); Kamil Ibragimov; Konstantin Lokhanov; Timur Safin; Aleksandr Trushakov	Italy (ITA); Dario Cavaliere; Alberto Pellegrini; Giovanni Repetti	Ukraine (UKR); Oleksii Statsenko; Roman Svichkar; Yuriy Tsap; Andriy Yahodka

=== Women ===
Event	Gold	Silver	Bronze
Individual Épée	Sun Yiwen; China	Ana Maria Popescu; Romania	Tatyana Andryushina; Russia
Individual Épée	Sun Yiwen; China	Ana Maria Popescu; Romania	Magdalena Piekarska; Poland
Team Épée	Russia (RUS); Tatyana Andryushina; Tatyana Gudkova; Anastasiia Ivanova; Anastasia Soldatova	Ukraine (UKR); Dzhoan Bezhura; Inna Brovko; Alina Komashchuk; Olena Kryvytska	China (CHN); Lin Sheng; Shen Chen; Sun Yiwen; Zhu Mingye
Individual Foil	Inna Deriglazova; Russia	Pauline Ranvier; France	Julia Walczyk; Poland
Individual Foil	Inna Deriglazova; Russia	Pauline Ranvier; France	Anita Blaze; France
Team Foil	Russia (RUS); Inna Deriglazova; Anastasiia Ivanova; Olga Nikitina; Adelina Zagidullina	Italy (ITA); Eisabetta Bianchin; Valentina De Costanzo; Martina Sinigalia	Poland (POL); Bogna Jóźwiak; Hanna Łyczbińska; Martyna Synoradzka; Julia Walczyk
Individual Sabre	Yana Egorian; Russia	Qian Jiarui; China	Alina Komashchuk; Ukraine
Individual Sabre	Yana Egorian; Russia	Qian Jiarui; China	Małgorzata Kozaczuk; Poland
Team Sabre	Russia (RUS); Yana Egorian; Olga Nikitina; Anastasia Soldatova; Sofya Velikaya	China (CHN); Gu Wenqing; Qian Jiarui; Shao Yaqi; Shen Chen	Ukraine (UKR); Yuliya Bakastova; Dzhoan Bezhura; Alina Komashchuk; Olena Voronina

=== Medal table ===
* Host nation (China)

Rank	Nation	Gold	Silver	Bronze	Total
1	Russia	8	2	2	12
2	Italy	1	2	3	6
3	China*	1	2	1	4
4	Ukraine	1	1	3	5
5	Germany	1	0	1	2
6	France	0	3	1	4
7	Hungary	0	1	0	1
7	Romania	0	1	0	1
9	Poland	0	0	4	4
10	South Korea	0	0	2	2
11	Switzerland	0	0	1	1
Totals (11 entries)		12	12	18	42
