= Venezuela at the 2019 Military World Games =

- IOC code: VEN

in Wuhan, China 18 October 2019 – 27 October 2019
- Medals Ranked 55th: Gold 0 Silver 0 Bronze 2 Total 2

Military World Games appearances
- 1995; 1999; 2003; 2007; 2011; 2015; 2019; 2023

Venezuela competed at the 2019 Military World Games held in Wuhan, China from 18 to 27 October 2019. In total, athletes representing Venezuela won two bronze medals and the country finished in 55th place in the medal table. Both medals were won in boxing.

== Medal summary ==
=== Medal by sports ===
Medals by sport
Sport	1st place, gold medalist(s)	2nd place, silver medalist(s)	3rd place, bronze medalist(s)	Total
Boxing	0	0	2	2

=== Medalists ===
Medal	Name	Sport	Event
Bronze	Edgar Muñoz	Boxing	Men's +91 kg
Bronze	Krisandy Rios	Boxing	Women's -60 kg
