= Aeronautical pentathlon at the 2019 Military World Games =

- Dates: 19–24 October

Aeronautical pentathlon at the 2019 Military World Games was held in Wuhan, China from 19 to 24 October 2019.

== Medal summary ==
Event	Gold	Silver	Bronze
Flying contest	Liao Weihua; China	Frederico Brito; Brazil	Mikko Honkasalo; Finland
Men individual	Li Rui; China	Li Minghao; China	Ye Bangwu; China
Women individual	He Haoqin; China	Cheng Xin; China	Wang Jia; China
Men team	China; Xu Wenfan; Li Minghao; Li Rui; Ye Bangwu	Brazil; Andre Kuroswiski; Joel Belo; Frederico Brito; Ariel Kaczmark	Finland; Lauri Lappalainen; Kari Korhonen; Ville Rosenlund; Mikko Honkasalo
Women team	China; He Haoqin; Cheng Xin; Wang Jia	Brazil; Mayara Silva; Ellen Souza; Mariana Laporte	Norway; Anniken Milhahn; Ane Thea Kristoffersen; Stine Sjo
