= Finland at the 2019 Military World Games =

- Flag of Finland
- IOC code: FIN

in Wuhan, China 18 October 2019 – 27 October 2019
- Medals Ranked 34th: Gold 0 Silver 4 Bronze 2 Total 6

Military World Games appearances
- 1995; 1999; 2003; 2007; 2011; 2015; 2019; 2023

Finland competed at the 2019 Military World Games held in Wuhan, China from 18 to 27 October 2019. In total, athletes representing Finland won four silver medals and two bronze medals and the country finished in 34th place in the medal table.

== Medal summary ==
=== Medal by sports ===
Medals by sport
| Sport | 1st place, gold medalist(s) | 2nd place, silver medalist(s) | 3rd place, bronze medalist(s) | Total |
|---|---|---|---|---|
| Aeronautical pentathlon | 0 | 0 | 2 | 2 |
| Naval pentathlon | 0 | 1 | 0 | 1 |
| Shooting | 0 | 2 | 0 | 2 |
| Wrestling | 0 | 1 | 0 | 1 |

=== Medalists ===
| Medal | Name | Sport | Event |
|---|---|---|---|
| Silver | Juho Autio; Aleksi Leppä; Juho Kurki | Shooting | Men's 300m Military Rapid Fire Rifle Team |
| Silver | Oskari Kössi; Eetu Kallioinen; Tomi Aspholm | Shooting | Men's Shotgun Men Skeet Team |
| Silver | Women's team | Naval pentathlon | Women's obstacle relay |
| Silver | Elias Kuosmanen | Wrestling | Men's Greco-Roman 97 kg |
| Bronze | Mikko Honkasalo | Aeronautical pentathlon | Flying contest |
| Bronze | Lauri Lappalainen; Kari Korhonen; Ville Rosenlund; Mikko Honkasalo | Aeronautical pentathlon | Men team |
