= Mongolia at the 2019 Military World Games =

- Flag of Mongolia
- IOC code: MGL

in Wuhan, China 18 October 2019 – 27 October 2019
- Medals Ranked 24th: Gold 1 Silver 3 Bronze 5 Total 9

Military World Games appearances
- 1995; 1999; 2003; 2007; 2011; 2015; 2019; 2023

Mongolia competed at the 2019 Military World Games held in Wuhan, China from 18 to 27 October 2019. In total, athletes representing Mongolia won one gold medal, three silver medals and five bronze medals. The country finished in 24th place in the medal table.

== Medal summary ==
=== Medal by sports ===
Medals by sport
Sport	1st place, gold medalist(s)	2nd place, silver medalist(s)	3rd place, bronze medalist(s)	Total
Boxing	0	1	2	3
Judo	0	0	2	2
Shooting	1	1	0	2
Wrestling	0	1	1	2

=== Medalists ===
Medal	Name	Sport	Event
Gold	Otryadyn Gündegmaa	Shooting	Women 25m Military Rapid Fire Pistol Women Individual
Silver	Kherlentsetseg Gantumur	Shooting	Women 25m Military Rapid Fire Pistol Women Individual
Silver	Enkh Amar Kharkhuu	Boxing	Men's -56 kg
Silver	Sükheegiin Tserenchimed	Wrestling	Women's freestyle 57 kg
Bronze	Enkhmandakh Kharkhuu	Boxing	Men's -52 kg
Bronze	Shinebayar Narmandakh	Boxing	Men's -81 kg
Bronze	Ariunbold Enkhtaiwan	Judo	Men's -60 kg
Bronze	Battogtokhyn Erkhembayar	Judo	Men's -66 kg
Bronze	Enkh-Amaryn Davaanasan	Wrestling	Women's freestyle 68 kg
