= Hungary at the 2019 Military World Games =

- Flag of Hungary
- IOC code: HUN

in Wuhan, China 18 October 2019 – 27 October 2019
- Medals Ranked 25th: Gold 1 Silver 3 Bronze 1 Total 5

Military World Games appearances
- 1995; 1999; 2003; 2007; 2011; 2015; 2019; 2023

Hungary competed at the 2019 Military World Games held in Wuhan, China from 18 to 27 October 2019. According to the official results athletes representing Hungary won one gold medal, three silver medals and one bronze medal; instead, the medal count appears to be four rather than five (see below). The country finished in 25th place in the medal table.

== Medal summary ==
=== Medal by sports ===
Medals by sport
Sport	1st place, gold medalist(s)	2nd place, silver medalist(s)	3rd place, bronze medalist(s)	Total
Fencing	0	1	0	1
Judo	0	1	0	1
Modern pentathlon	0	1	0	1
Wrestling	1	0	0	1

=== Medalists ===
Medal	Name	Sport	Event
Gold	Viktor Lőrincz	Wrestling	Men's Greco-Roman 87 kg
Silver	Dániel Berta; András Peterdi; Gergely Siklósi	Fencing	Men's Team Épée
Silver	Evelin Salánki	Judo	Women's -78 kg
Silver	Mixed team	Modern pentathlon	Mixed relay
