= North Korea national badminton team =

North Korean national badminton team

North Korea
- Association: DPR Korea Badminton Association (PRKBA)
- Confederation: BA (Asia)
- President: Cha Myong-nam

BWF ranking
- Current ranking: Unranked (2 January 2024)
- Highest ranking: Unranked

Sudirman Cup
- Appearances: 1 (first in 1991)
- Best result: Group stage (1991)

The North Korea national badminton team (Korean: 조선민주주의인민공화국의 배드민턴 국가대표팀) represents North Korea in international badminton team competitions. The team has participated once in the Sudirman Cup, which was in 1991. The team was ranked 31st in the leaderboards. The North Korean team made a rare public appearance after a long hiatus in competing when they participated in the 2019 Military World Games badminton team event in Wuhan, China. They have never medaled in any badminton tournament.

== History ==
It is unknown when the national badminton team of North Korea was established. The national team soon became affiliated with the Olympic Committee of the Democratic People's Republic of Korea and was eligible to compete in international tournaments. North Korea has not competed in many team tournaments in the international stage. The national team made a few appearances in international team tournaments and have achieved decent results in the 1990s.

=== Men's team ===
The North Korean men's team made their international debut when the team competed in the 1974 Asian Games. They were eliminated in the first round. In 1990, the team competed in the qualifiers for the 1990 Thomas Cup. The team finished on the bottom of their group, losing 5–0 to Iceland, 4–1 to Belgium. The team almost beat France but lost 3–2. The team later competed in the 1990 Asian Games in September 1990. The team had a bye in the first round and entered the quarter-finals. The team failed to advance further after losing to Malaysia 5–0 in quarter-finals. In 1993, the team competed in the 1993 East Asian Games men's team event and lost the quarter-finals to China.

After 26 years, the men's team made another appearance in the 2019 Military World Games men's team event. The team lost 5–0 to China, South Korea and Thailand in the group but won 3–2 against France to achieve fourth place in the event.

=== Women's team ===
The women's team took part in qualifying for the 1990 Uber Cup. The team failed to qualify after finishing 2nd in their group. The team won 3–2 against Austria, 5–0 against Spain but lost 0–5 to the United States.

=== Mixed team ===
The North Korean mixed team first competed in the 1991 Sudirman Cup. The team were placed in Group 8 with teams Spain, Mauritius, Italy and Malta. The team performed well and topped the group, winning 4–1 against Spain and Mauritius, then 5–0 against Italy and Malta. The team finished in 31st place on the overall ranking.

== Competitive record ==
=== Thomas Cup ===
Year	Result
(England) 1949	Did not enter
(Colony of Singapore) 1952	Did not enter
(Colony of Singapore) 1955	Did not enter
(Colony of Singapore) 1958	Did not enter
(Indonesia) 1961	Did not enter
(Japan) 1964	Did not enter
(Indonesia) 1967	Did not enter
(Malaysia) 1970	Did not enter
(Indonesia) 1973	Did not enter
(Thailand) 1976	Did not enter
(Indonesia) 1979	Did not enter
(England) 1982	Did not enter
(Malaysia) 1984	Did not enter
(Indonesia) 1986	Did not enter
(Malaysia) 1988	Did not enter
(Japan) 1990	Did not qualify
(Malaysia) 1992	Did not enter
(Indonesia) 1994	Withdrew
(Hong Kong) 1996	Did not enter
(Hong Kong) 1998
(Malaysia) 2000
(China) 2002
(Indonesia) 2004
(Japan) 2006
(Indonesia) 2008
(Malaysia) 2010
(China) 2012
(India) 2014
(China) 2016
(Thailand) 2018
(Denmark) 2020
(Thailand) 2022
(China) 2024
(N/A) 2026	TBD
(N/A) 2028	TBD
(N/A) 2030	TBD

=== Uber Cup ===
Year	Result
(England) 1957	Did not enter
(United States) 1960	Did not enter
(United States) 1963	Did not enter
(New Zealand) 1966	Did not enter
(Japan) 1969	Did not enter
(Japan) 1972	Did not enter
(Indonesia) 1975	Did not enter
(New Zealand) 1978	Did not enter
(Japan) 1981	Did not enter
(Malaysia) 1984	Did not enter
(Indonesia) 1986	Did not enter
(Malaysia) 1988	Did not enter
(Japan) 1990	Did not qualify
(Malaysia) 1992	Did not enter
(Indonesia) 1994	Did not qualify
(Hong Kong) 1996	Did not enter
(Hong Kong) 1998	Did not enter
(Malaysia) 2000	Did not enter
(China) 2002	Did not enter
(Indonesia) 2004	Did not enter
(Japan) 2006	Did not enter
(Indonesia) 2008	Did not enter
(Malaysia) 2010	Did not enter
(China) 2012	Did not enter
(India) 2014	Did not enter
(China) 2016	Did not enter
(Thailand) 2018	Did not enter
(Denmark) 2020	Did not enter
(Thailand) 2022	Did not enter
(China) 2024	TBD
(N/A) 2026	TBD
(N/A) 2028	TBD
(N/A) 2030	TBD

=== Sudirman Cup ===
Year	Result
(Indonesia) 1989	Did not enter
(Denmark) 1991	Group 8 – 31st
(England) 1993	Did not enter
(Switzerland) 1995	Did not enter
(Scotland) 1997	Did not enter
(Denmark) 1999	Did not enter
(Spain) 2001	Did not enter
(Netherlands) 2003	Did not enter
(China) 2005	Did not enter
(Scotland) 2007	Did not enter
(China) 2009	Did not enter
(China) 2011	Did not enter
(Malaysia) 2013	Did not enter
(China) 2015	Did not enter
(Australia) 2017	Did not enter
(China) 2019	Did not enter
(Finland) 2021	Did not enter
(China) 2023	Did not enter
(China) 2025	TBD
(N/A) 2027	TBD
(N/A) 2029	TBD

=== Asian Games ===
==== Men's team ====
Year	Result
(Indonesia) 1962	Did not enter
(Thailand) 1966	Did not enter
(Thailand) 1970	Did not enter
(Iran) 1974	Round of 16
(Thailand) 1978	Did not enter
(India) 1982	Did not enter
(South Korea) 1986	Did not enter
(China) 1990	Quarter-finals
(Japan) 1994	Did not enter
(Thailand) 1998	Did not enter
(South Korea) 2002	Did not enter
(Qatar) 2006	Did not enter
(China) 2010	Did not enter
(South Korea) 2014	Did not enter
(Indonesia) 2018	Did not enter
(China) 2022	Did not enter
(Japan) 2026	TBD
(Qatar) 2030	TBD
(Saudi Arabia) 2034	TBD

==== Women's team ====
Year	Result
(Indonesia) 1962	Did not enter
(Thailand) 1966	Did not enter
(Thailand) 1970	Did not enter
(Iran) 1974	Quarter-finals
(Thailand) 1978	Did not enter
(India) 1982	Did not enter
(South Korea) 1986	Did not enter
(China) 1990	Did not enter
(Japan) 1994	Did not enter
(Thailand) 1998	Did not enter
(South Korea) 2002	Did not enter
(Qatar) 2006	Did not enter
(China) 2010	Did not enter
(South Korea) 2014	Did not enter
(Indonesia) 2018	Did not enter
(China) 2022	Did not enter
(Japan) 2026	TBD
(Qatar) 2030	TBD
(Saudi Arabia) 2034	TBD

=== Asian Team Championships ===
==== Men's team ====
Year	Result
(Malaysia) 1962	Did not enter
(India) 1965	Did not enter
(Philippines) 1969	Did not enter
(Indonesia) 1971	Did not enter
(India) 1976	Did not enter
(India) 1983	Did not enter
(Malaysia) 1985	Did not enter
(Indonesia) 1987	Did not enter
(China) 1989	Did not enter
(Hong Kong) 1993	Did not enter
(Malaysia) 2004	Did not enter
(India) 2006	Did not enter
(Vietnam) 2008	Did not enter
(Thailand) 2010	Did not enter
(Macau) 2012	Did not enter
(India) 2016	Did not enter
(Malaysia) 2018	Did not enter
(Philippines) 2020	Did not enter
(Malaysia) 2022	Did not enter
(United Arab Emirates) 2024	TBD
(United Arab Emirates) 2026	TBD

==== Women's team ====
Year	Result
(Malaysia) 2004	Did not enter
(India) 2006	Did not enter
(Vietnam) 2008	Did not enter
(Thailand) 2010	Did not enter
(Macau) 2012	Did not enter
(India) 2016	Did not enter
(Malaysia) 2018	Did not enter
(Philippines) 2020	Did not enter
(Malaysia) 2022	Did not enter
(United Arab Emirates) 2024	TBD
(United Arab Emirates) 2026	TBD

==== Mixed team ====
Year	Result
(Vietnam) 2017	Did not enter
(Hong Kong) 2019	Did not enter
(United Arab Emirates) 2023	Did not enter
(United Arab Emirates) 2025	TBD
(United Arab Emirates) 2027	TBD

=== East Asian Games ===
==== Men's team ====
Year	Result
(China) 1993	Quarter-finals
(South Korea) 1997	Did not enter
(Hong Kong) 2009	Did not enter
(China) 2013	Did not enter

==== Women's team ====
Year	Result
(China) 1993	Did not enter
(South Korea) 1997	Did not enter
(Hong Kong) 2009	Did not enter
(China) 2013	Did not enter

=== Military World Games ===
==== Men's team ====
Year	Result
(China) 2019	Fourth place

**Red border color indicates tournament was held on home soil.

== Junior competitive record ==
=== Suhandinata Cup ===
Year	Result
(China) 2000	Did not enter
(South Africa) 2002	Did not enter
(Canada) 2004	Did not enter
(South Korea) 2006	Did not enter
(New Zealand) 2007	Did not enter
(India) 2008	Did not enter
(Malaysia) 2009	Did not enter
(Mexico) 2010	Did not enter
(Chinese Taipei) 2011	Did not enter
(Japan) 2012	Did not enter
(Thailand) 2013	Did not enter
(Malaysia) 2014	Did not enter
(Peru) 2015	Did not enter
(Spain) 2016	Did not enter
(Indonesia) 2017	Did not enter
(Canada) 2018	Did not enter
(Russia) 2019	Did not enter
(Spain) 2022	Did not enter

=== Asian Junior Team Championships ===
==== Boys' team ====
Year	Result
(Philippines) 1997	Did not enter
(Malaysia) 1998	Did not enter
(Myanmar) 1999	Did not enter
(Japan) 2000	Did not enter
(Chinese Taipei) 2001	Did not enter
(Malaysia) 2002	Did not enter
(South Korea) 2004	Did not enter
(Indonesia) 2005	Did not enter

==== Girls' team ====
Year	Result
(Philippines) 1997	Did not enter
(Malaysia) 1998	Did not enter
(Myanmar) 1999	Did not enter
(Japan) 2000	Did not enter
(Chinese Taipei) 2001	Did not enter
(Malaysia) 2002	Did not enter
(South Korea) 2004	Did not enter
(Indonesia) 2005	Did not enter

==== Mixed team ====
Year	Result
(Malaysia) 2006	Did not enter
(Malaysia) 2007	Did not enter
(Malaysia) 2008	Group stage
(Malaysia) 2009	Did not enter
(Malaysia) 2010	Did not enter
(India) 2011	Did not enter
(South Korea) 2012	Did not enter
(Malaysia) 2013	Did not enter
(Chinese Taipei) 2014	Did not enter
(Thailand) 2015	Did not enter
(Thailand) 2016	Did not enter
(Indonesia) 2017	Did not enter
(Indonesia) 2018	Did not enter
(China) 2019	Did not enter
(Indonesia) 2023	Did not enter
(N/A) 2024	TBD
(N/A) 2025	TBD

**Red border color indicates tournament was held on home soil.

== Staff ==
The following list shows the coaching staff of the North Korean national badminton team.

Name	Role
(North Korea) Chang Son-nam	Coach
(North Korea) Kim Chung-il	Assistant coach
(North Korea) Ri Sung-gwon	Assistant coach

== Players ==
=== Current squad ===
As of 2 January 2024

==== Men's team ====
Name	DoB/Age	Ranking of event		
Name	DoB/Age	MS	MD	XD
Kim Chung-il	22 September 1990 (age 35)	–	–	–
Choe Mu-gwang	18 February 1997 (age 29)	–	–	–
Ri Sung-gwon	20 July 1995 (age 30)	–	–	–
Yu Ho-chol	18 January 1990 (age 36)	–	–	–
Pak Kum-yong	1 February 1997 (age 29)	–	–	–
Pak Ryong-gun	25 July 2002 (age 23)	–	–	–
Hwang Jin	7 February 2000 (age 26)	–	–	–

==== Women's team ====
Name	DoB/Age	Ranking of event		
Name	DoB/Age	WS	WD	XD
Kim Jin-hyang	11 January 1999 (age 27)	–	–	–
Yu Mi-song	15 April 2002 (age 24)	–	–	–
Jang Jin-hyang	27 July 1995 (age 30)	–	–	–
O Ye-gyong	7 March 1993 (age 33)	–	–	–
Kim Sol-hui	14 January 1992 (age 34)	–	–	–
Kim Un-sun	13 April 1991 (age 35)	–	–	–
Ri Jong-hyang	2 January 1994 (age 32)	–	–	–
