= Slovenia at the 2019 Military World Games =

- Flag of Slovenia
- IOC code: SLO

Military World Games appearances
- 1995; 1999; 2003; 2007; 2011; 2015; 2019; 2023

Slovenia competed at the 2019 Military World Games held in Wuhan, China from 18 to 27 October 2019.

== Medal summary ==
=== Medal by sports ===
Medals by sport
Sport	1st place, gold medalist(s)	2nd place, silver medalist(s)	3rd place, bronze medalist(s)	Total
Athletics	1	1	0	2
Judo	1	1	0	2
Sailing	0	0	1	1
Shooting	0	0	1	1
Swimming	0	1	0	1

=== Medalists ===
Medal	Name	Sport	Event
Gold	Maja Mihalinec	Athletics	Women 200 metres
Gold	Klara Apotekar	Judo	Women -78 kg
Silver	Maruša Mišmaš	Athletics	Women 3000 metres steeplechase
Silver	Anamari Velenšek	Judo	Women +78 kg
Silver	Tjaša Oder	Swimming	Women's 1500 metres freestyle
Bronze	T. Mrak; V. Macarol	Sailing	Women 470 Class Race
Bronze	Robert Markoja	Shooting	Men 300m Standard Rifle 3 Positions Individual
