= Latvia at the 2019 Military World Games =

- IOC code: LAT

in Wuhan, China 18 October 2019 – 27 October 2019
- Medals Ranked 29th: Gold 1 Silver 1 Bronze 0 Total 2

Military World Games appearances
- 1995; 1999; 2003; 2007; 2011; 2015; 2019; 2023

Latvia competed at the 2019 Military World Games held in Wuhan, China from 18 to 27 October 2019. In total, athletes representing Latvia won one gold and one silver medal and the country finished in 29th place in the medal table. Both medals were won in cycling.

== Medal summary ==
=== Medal by sports ===
Medals by sport
Sport	1st place, gold medalist(s)	2nd place, silver medalist(s)	3rd place, bronze medalist(s)	Total
Cycling	1	1	0	2

=== Medalists ===
Medal	Name	Sport	Event
Gold	Latvia	Cycling	Men's team road race
Silver	Andris Vosekalns	Cycling	Men's individual road race
