= Thailand at the 2019 Military World Games =

- Flag of Thailand
- IOC code: THA

in Wuhan, China 18 October 2019 – 27 October 2019
- Medals Ranked 42nd: Gold 0 Silver 1 Bronze 5 Total 6

Military World Games appearances
- 1995; 1999; 2003; 2007; 2011; 2015; 2019; 2023

Thailand competed at the 2019 Military World Games held in Wuhan, China from 18 to 27 October 2019. In total, athletes representing Thailand won one silver and five bronze medals and the country finished in 42nd place in the medal table.

== Medal summary ==
=== Medal by sports ===
Medals by sport
Sport	1st place, gold medalist(s)	2nd place, silver medalist(s)	3rd place, bronze medalist(s)	Total
Badminton	0	1	1	2
Boxing	0	0	2	2
Shooting	0	0	2	2

=== Medalists ===
Medal	Name	Sport	Event
Silver	Men's team	Badminton	Men team
Bronze	Nanthakarn Yorkphaisong; Inkarat Apisuk	Badminton	Men's doubles
Bronze	Chatchai Decha Butdee	Boxing	Men's -56 kg
Bronze	Sailom Ardee	Boxing	Men's -69 kg
Bronze	Naphaswan Yangpaiboon	Shooting	Women's 25m Pistol Women Individual
Bronze	Isarapa Imprasertsuk; Nutchaya Sutarporn; Chalalai Nasakul	Shooting	Women's Shotgun Women Skeet Team
