= Turkey at the 2019 Military World Games =

- Flag of Turkey
- IOC code: TUR

in Wuhan, China 18 October 2019 – 27 October 2019
- Medals Ranked 22nd: Gold 2 Silver 0 Bronze 3 Total 5

Military World Games appearances
- 1995; 1999; 2003; 2007; 2011; 2015; 2019; 2023

Turkey competed at the 2019 Military World Games held in Wuhan, China from 18 to 27 October 2019. In total, athletes representing Turkey won two gold medals and three bronze medals. All medals were won in wrestling and the country finished in 22nd place in the medal table.

== Medal summary ==
=== Medal by sports ===
Medals by sport
Sport	1st place, gold medalist(s)	2nd place, silver medalist(s)	3rd place, bronze medalist(s)	Total
Wrestling	2	0	3	5

=== Medalists ===
Medal	Name	Sport	Event
Gold	Taha Akgül	Wrestling	Men's freestyle 125 kg
Gold	Rıza Kayaalp	Wrestling	Men's Greco-Roman 130 kg
Bronze	Selahattin Kılıçsallayan	Wrestling	Men's freestyle 65 kg
Bronze	Soner Demirtaş	Wrestling	Men's freestyle 74 kg
Bronze	Fatih Yaşarlı	Wrestling	Men's freestyle 97 kg
