= Egypt at the 2019 Military World Games =

- Flag of Egypt
- IOC code: EGY

in Wuhan, China 18 October 2019 – 27 October 2019
- Medals Ranked 19th: Gold 2 Silver 2 Bronze 5 Total 9

Military World Games appearances
- 1995; 1999; 2003; 2007; 2011; 2015; 2019; 2023

Egypt competed at the 2019 Military World Games held in Wuhan, China from 18 to 27 October 2019. In total, athletes representing Egypt won two gold medals, two silver medals and five bronze medals. The country finished in 19th place in the medal table.

== Medal summary ==
=== Medal by sports ===
Medals by sport
Sport	1st place, gold medalist(s)	2nd place, silver medalist(s)	3rd place, bronze medalist(s)	Total
Boxing	0	1	0	1
Modern pentathlon	1	0	1	2
Taekwondo	0	1	3	4
Wrestling	1	0	1	2

=== Medalists ===
Medal	Name	Sport	Event
Gold	Mixed team	Modern pentathlon	Mixed relay
Gold	Mohamed Ibrahim	Wrestling	Men's Greco-Roman 67 kg
Silver	Abdelrahman Orabi	Boxing	Men's -81 kg
Silver	Nour Abdelsalam	Taekwondo	Women's -49 kg
Bronze	Salma Abdelmaksoud	Modern pentathlon	Women individual
Bronze	Abdelrahman Mostafa	Taekwondo	Men's -68 kg
Bronze	Seif Eissa	Taekwondo	Men's -80 kg
Bronze	Hedaya Malak	Taekwondo	Women's -67 kg
Bronze	Abdellatif Mohamed	Wrestling	Men's Greco-Roman 130 kg
