= Tunisia at the 2019 Military World Games =

- IOC code: TUN

in Wuhan, China 18 October 2019 – 27 October 2019
- Medals Ranked 31st: Gold 1 Silver 0 Bronze 0 Total 1

Military World Games appearances
- 1995; 1999; 2003; 2007; 2011; 2015; 2019; 2023

Tunisia competed at the 2019 Military World Games held in Wuhan, China from 18 to 27 October 2019. In total, athletes representing Tunisia won one gold medal and the country finished in 31st place in the medal table.

== Medal summary ==
=== Medal by sports ===
Medals by sport
Sport	1st place, gold medalist(s)	2nd place, silver medalist(s)	3rd place, bronze medalist(s)	Total
Taekwondo	1	0	0	1

=== Medalists ===
Medal	Name	Sport	Event
Gold	Firas Katoussi	Taekwondo	Men's -74 kg
