= Kazakhstan at the 2019 Military World Games =

- Flag of Kazakhstan
- IOC code: KAZ

in Wuhan, China 18 October 2019 – 27 October 2019
- Medals Ranked 12th: Gold 4 Silver 3 Bronze 5 Total 12

Military World Games appearances
- 1995; 1999; 2003; 2007; 2011; 2015; 2019; 2023

Kazakhstan competed at the 2019 Military World Games held in Wuhan, China from 18 to 27 October 2019. In total, athletes representing Kazakhstan won four gold medals, three silver medals and five bronze medals. The country finished in 12th place in the medal table.

== Medal summary ==
=== Medal by sports ===
Medals by sport
Sport	1st place, gold medalist(s)	2nd place, silver medalist(s)	3rd place, bronze medalist(s)	Total
Athletics	1	0	0	1
Boxing	2	2	3	7
Taekwondo	1	0	0	1
Wrestling	0	1	2	3

=== Medalists ===
Medal	Name	Sport	Event
Gold	Olga Rypakova	Athletics	Women's triple jump
Gold	Temirtas Zhussupov	Boxing	Men's -49 kg
Gold	Aslanbek Shymbergenov	Boxing	Men's -69 kg
Gold	Ruslan Zhaparov	Taekwondo	Men's +87 kg
Silver	Dilmurat Mizhitov	Boxing	Men's -64 kg
Silver	Abzal Kuttybekov	Boxing	Men's -91 kg
Silver	Nurkozha Kaipanov	Wrestling	Men's freestyle 74 kg
Bronze	Timur Nurseitov	Boxing	Men's -75 kg
Bronze	Ayat Marzhikpayev	Boxing	Men's -81 kg
Bronze	Bayan Akbayeva	Boxing	Women's -69 kg
Bronze	Aidos Sultangali	Wrestling	Men's Greco-Roman 60 kg
Bronze	Gulmaral Yerkebayeva	Wrestling	Women's freestyle 76 kg
