= Vietnam at the 2019 Military World Games =

- IOC code: VIE

in Wuhan, China 18 October 2019 – 27 October 2019
- Competitors: 32
- Medals Ranked 46th: Gold 0 Silver 1 Bronze 1 Total 2

Military World Games appearances
- 1995; 1999; 2003; 2007; 2011; 2015; 2019; 2023

Vietnam competed at the 2019 Military World Games held in Wuhan, China from 18 to 27 October 2019. In total, 32 athletes represented Vietnam, aiming to and succeeding in winning one silver and one bronze medal. The country finished in 46th place in the medal table.

== Medal summary ==
=== Medal by sports ===
Medals by sport
Sport	1st place, gold medalist(s)	2nd place, silver medalist(s)	3rd place, bronze medalist(s)	Total
Boxing	0	0	1	1
Swimming	0	1	0	1

=== Medalists ===
Medal	Name	Sport	Event
Silver	Nguyễn Thị Ánh Viên	Swimming	Women's 400m individual medley
Bronze	Thi Kieu Diem Trinh	Boxing	Women's -51 kg
