= Azerbaijan at the 2019 Military World Games =

- Flag of Azerbaijan
- IOC code: AZE

in Wuhan, China 18 October 2019 – 27 October 2019
- Medals Ranked 38th: Gold 0 Silver 2 Bronze 4 Total 6

Military World Games appearances
- 1995; 1999; 2003; 2007; 2011; 2015; 2019; 2023

Azerbaijan competed at the 2019 Military World Games held in Wuhan, China from 18 to 27 October 2019. In total, athletes representing Azerbaijan won two silver and four bronze medals and the country finished in 38th place in the medal table.

== Medal summary ==
=== Medal by sports ===
Medals by sport
Sport	1st place, gold medalist(s)	2nd place, silver medalist(s)	3rd place, bronze medalist(s)	Total
Boxing	0	0	1	1
Judo	0	0	2	2
Wrestling	0	2	1	3

=== Medalists ===
Medal	Name	Sport	Event
Silver	Hasan Aliyev	Wrestling	Men's Greco-Roman 77 kg
Silver	Rafig Huseynov	Wrestling	Men's Greco-Roman 87 kg
Bronze	Salman Alizada	Boxing	Men's -49 kg
Bronze	Hidayat Heydarov	Judo	Men's -81 kg
Bronze	Mammadali Mehdiyev	Judo	Men's -90 kg
Bronze	Mikayil Rahmanov	Wrestling	Men's Greco-Roman 67 kg
