= Uzbekistan at the 2019 Military World Games =

- Flag of Uzbekistan
- IOC code: UZB

in Wuhan, China 18 October 2019 – 27 October 2019
- Medals Ranked 9th: Gold 8 Silver 7 Bronze 5 Total 20

Military World Games appearances
- 1995; 1999; 2003; 2007; 2011; 2015; 2019; 2023

Uzbekistan competed at the 2019 Military World Games held in Wuhan, China from 18 to 27 October 2019. In total, athletes representing Uzbekistan won eight gold medals, seven silver medals and five bronze medals. The country finished in 9th place in the medal table.

== Medal summary ==
=== Medal by sports ===
Medals by sport
| Sport | 1st place, gold medalist(s) | 2nd place, silver medalist(s) | 3rd place, bronze medalist(s) | Total |
|---|---|---|---|---|
| Boxing | 2 | 2 | 0 | 4 |
| Judo | 2 | 2 | 2 | 6 |
| Taekwondo | 4 | 3 | 3 | 10 |

=== Medalists ===
| Medal | Name | Sport | Event |
|---|---|---|---|
| Gold | Kozimbek Mardonov | Boxing | Men's -81 kg |
| Gold | Madiyar Saydrakhimov | Boxing | Men's -91 kg |
| Gold | Artyom Shturbabin | Judo | Men's -66 kg |
| Gold | Khikmatillokh Turaev | Judo | Men's -73 kg |
| Gold | Ulugbek Rashitov | Taekwondo | Men's -58 kg |
| Gold | Madinabonu Mannopova | Taekwondo | Women's -49 kg |
| Gold | Charos Kayumova | Taekwondo | Women's -53 kg |
| Gold | Svetlana Osipova | Taekwondo | Women's +73 kg |
| Silver | Shunkor Abdurasulov | Boxing | Men's -60 kg |
| Silver | Bilolbek Mirzarakhimov | Boxing | Men's -69 kg |
| Silver | Mukhriddin Tilovov | Judo | Men's -66 kg |
| Silver | Bekmurod Oltiboev | Judo | Men's +100 kg |
| Silver | Sardor Toirov | Taekwondo | Men's -68 kg |
| Silver | Dinorahon Mamadibragimova | Taekwondo | Women's -57 kg |
| Silver | Nigora Tursunkulova | Taekwondo | Women's -67 kg |
| Bronze | Diyora Keldiyorova | Judo | Women's -52 kg |
| Bronze | Gulnoza Matniyazova | Judo | Women's -70 kg |
| Bronze | Otabek Turganbekov | Taekwondo | Men's -54 kg |
| Bronze | Niyaz Pulatov | Taekwondo | Men's -63 kg |
| Bronze | Feruza Sadikova | Taekwondo | Women's -62 kg |
