= Switzerland at the 2019 Military World Games =

- Flag of Switzerland
- IOC code: SUI

in Wuhan, China 18 October 2019 – 27 October 2019
- Medals Ranked 15th: Gold 4 Silver 1 Bronze 8 Total 13

Military World Games appearances
- 1995; 1999; 2003; 2007; 2011; 2015; 2019; 2023

Switzerland competed at the 2019 Military World Games held in Wuhan, China from 18 to 27 October 2019. According to the official results athletes representing Switzerland won four gold medals, one silver medal and eight bronze medals; instead, the medal count appears to be 12 rather than 13 (see below). The country finished in 15th place in the medal table.

== Medal summary ==
=== Medal by sports ===
Medals by sport
Sport	1st place, gold medalist(s)	2nd place, silver medalist(s)	3rd place, bronze medalist(s)	Total
Fencing	0	0	1	1
Orienteering	3	1	2	6
Parachuting	0	0	1	1
Shooting	0	0	2	2
Swimming	0	0	1	1
Triathlon	1	0	0	1

=== Medalists ===
Medal	Name	Sport	Event
Gold	Matthias Kyburz	Orienteering	Men's individual middle distance
Gold	Men's team	Orienteering	Men's relay
Gold	Men's team	Orienteering	Men's team
Gold	Jolanda Annen	Triathlon	Women
Silver	Florian Howald	Orienteering	Men's individual middle distance
Bronze	Lucas Malcotti	Fencing	Men's individual Epee
Bronze	Men's team	Parachuting	Men's Formation Skydive
Bronze	Emanuel Egger	Orienteering	Men's individual middle distance
Bronze	Elena Roos	Orienteering	Women's individual long distance
Bronze	Jan Lochbihler; Rafael Bereuter; Gilles Vincent Dufaux	Shooting	Men's 300m Standard Rifle 3 Positions Team
Bronze	Jan Lochbihler	Shooting	Men's 300m Military Rapid Fire Rifle Individual
Bronze	Jérémy Desplanches	Swimming	Men's 200m individual medley
