= Aleksandra Hornik =

Polish orienteer

Personal information
- Nationality: Polish
- Born: 17 December 1996 (age 29)

Sport
- Sport: Orienteering
- Club: WKS Grunwald Poznań, Paimion Rasti
Medal record
Women's orienteering
Representing Poland
World University Championships
Silver medal – second place	2018 Kuortane	Mixed Relay
Bronze medal – third place	2018 Kuortane	Sprint
Bronze medal – third place	2018 Kuortane	Relay
Junior World Championships
Silver medal – second place	2016 Engadin	Middle

Aleksandra Hornik (born 17 December 1996) is a Polish orienteer. She was born in Poznań.

== Career ==
As a junior, she won a silver medal in the middle at the 2016 Junior World Championships in Engadin.

Competing in Orienteering at the 2019 Military World Games in Wuhan, she won a bronze medal in the middle distance, following the disqualification of several Chinese runners for organized cheating.

Competing at the 2024 World Orienteering Championships in Edinburgh, she placed fourth in the sprint final, five seconds behind bronze winner Natalia Gemperle.
