= Iran at the 2019 Military World Games =

- Flag of Iran
- IOC code: IRI

in Wuhan, China 18 October 2019 – 27 October 2019
- Medals Ranked 14th: Gold 4 Silver 2 Bronze 5 Total 11

Military World Games appearances
- 1995; 1999; 2003; 2007; 2011; 2015; 2019; 2023

Iran competed at the 2019 Military World Games held in Wuhan, China from 18 to 27 October 2019. In total, athletes representing Iran won four gold medals, two silver medals and five bronze medals. The country finished in 14th place in the medal table.

== Medal summary ==
=== Medal by sports ===
Medals by sport
| Sport | 1st place, gold medalist(s) | 2nd place, silver medalist(s) | 3rd place, bronze medalist(s) | Total |
|---|---|---|---|---|
| Athletics | 2 | 0 | 0 | 2 |
| Taekwondo | 0 | 1 | 3 | 4 |
| Wrestling | 2 | 1 | 2 | 5 |

=== Medalists ===
| Medal | Name | Sport | Event |
|---|---|---|---|
| Gold | Hassan Taftian | Athletics | Men's 100 metres |
| Gold | Mehdi Pirjahan | Athletics | Men's 400 metres hurdles |
| Gold | Mohammad Hossein Mohammadian | Wrestling | Men's freestyle 97 kg |
| Gold | Pejman Poshtam | Wrestling | Men's Greco-Roman 77 kg |
| Silver | Iman Akbarzadeh | Taekwondo | Men's -54 kg |
| Silver | Yadollah Mohebbi | Wrestling | Men's freestyle 125 kg |
| Bronze | Mohammad Hassan Palangafkan | Taekwondo | Men's -58 kg |
| Bronze | Mohammad Mehdi Emadi | Taekwondo | Men's -68 kg |
| Bronze | Amir Mohammad Bakhshi | Taekwondo | Men's -74 kg |
| Bronze | Ahmad Bazri | Wrestling | Men's freestyle 86 kg |
| Bronze | Amin Mirzazadeh | Wrestling | Men's Greco-Roman 130 kg |
