= Belarus at the 2019 Military World Games =

- Flag of Belarus
- IOC code: BLR

in Wuhan, China 18 October 2019 – 27 October 2019
- Medals Ranked 13th: Gold 4 Silver 2 Bronze 8 Total 14

Military World Games appearances
- 1995; 1999; 2003; 2007; 2011; 2015; 2019; 2023

Belarus competed at the 2019 Military World Games held in Wuhan, China from 18 to 27 October 2019. In total, athletes representing Belarus won four gold medals, two silver medals and eight bronze medals. The country finished in 13th place in the medal table.

== Medal summary ==
=== Medal by sports ===
Medals by sport
Sport	1st place, gold medalist(s)	2nd place, silver medalist(s)	3rd place, bronze medalist(s)	Total
Archery	1	0	0	1
Athletics	1	1	0	2
Boxing	1	0	1	2
Diving	0	0	1	1
Judo	1	0	0	1
Modern pentathlon	0	0	1	1
Parachuting	0	0	1	1
Wrestling	0	1	3	4

=== Medalists ===
Medal	Name	Sport	Event
Gold	Karyna Dziominskaya; Karyna Kazlouskaya; Aliaksandra Kuratnik	Archery	Women's team
Gold	Katsiaryna Paplauskaya	Athletics	Women's 100 metres hurdles
Gold	Dzmitry Asanau	Boxing	Men's -64 kg
Gold	Daniel Mukete	Judo	Men's -100 kg
Silver	Dzmitry Dziubin	Athletics	Men's 50 kilometres walk
Silver	Aliaksandr Hushtyn	Wrestling	Men's freestyle 97 kg
Bronze	Viktoryia Kebikava	Boxing	Women's -75 kg
Bronze	Yury Naurozau	Diving	Men's 3 m springboard
Bronze	Kirill Kasyanik	Modern pentathlon	Men individual
Bronze	Women's team	Parachuting	Women's Team Accuracy
Bronze	Aliaksandr Hrabovik	Wrestling	Men's Greco-Roman 97 kg
Bronze	Kseniya Stankevich	Wrestling	Women's freestyle 50 kg
Bronze	Anastasiya Huchok	Wrestling	Women's freestyle 62 kg
