= Military pentathlon at the 2019 Military World Games =

- Dates: 19–24 October

Military pentathlon at the 2019 Military World Games was held in Wuhan, China from 19 to 24 October 2019.

== Medal summary ==
Event	Gold	Silver	Bronze
Men individual	Pan Yucheng; China	Aniu Ergu; China	Douglas Castro; Brazil
Men team	China	Russia	Brazil
Men obstacle relay	North Korea	Ecuador	Ukraine
Women individual	Lu Pinpin; China	Guan Chaonan; China	Wang Tanglin; China
Women team	China	Denmark	Russia
