= Austria at the 2019 Military World Games =

- Flag of Austria
- IOC code: AUT

in Wuhan, China 18 October 2019 – 27 October 2019
- Medals Ranked 36th: Gold 0 Silver 3 Bronze 1 Total 4

Military World Games appearances
- 1995; 1999; 2003; 2007; 2011; 2015; 2019; 2023

Austria competed at the 2019 Military World Games held in Wuhan, China from 18 to 27 October 2019. In total, athletes representing Austria won three silver medals and one bronze medal and the country finished in 36th place in the medal table.

== Medal summary ==
=== Medal by sports ===
Medals by sport
| Sport | 1st place, gold medalist(s) | 2nd place, silver medalist(s) | 3rd place, bronze medalist(s) | Total |
|---|---|---|---|---|
| Cycling | 0 | 1 | 0 | 1 |
| Orienteering | 0 | 1 | 0 | 1 |
| Shooting | 0 | 1 | 1 | 2 |

=== Medalists ===
| Medal | Name | Sport | Event |
|---|---|---|---|
| Silver | Patrick Gamper | Cycling | Men's individual time trial |
| Silver | Ursula Kadan | Orienteering | Women's individual long distance |
| Silver | Bernhard Pickl; Gernot Rumpler; Alexander Schmirl | Shooting | Men's 300m Standard Rifle 3 Positions Team |
| Bronze | Gernot Rumpler; Bernhard Pickl; Alexander Schmirl | Shooting | Men's 300m Military Rapid Fire Rifle Team |
