= Serbia at the 2019 Military World Games =

- Flag of Serbia
- IOC code: SRB

in Wuhan, China 18 October 2019 – 27 October 2019
- Medals Ranked 54th: Gold 0 Silver 0 Bronze 3 Total 3

Military World Games appearances
- 1995; 1999; 2003; 2007; 2011; 2015; 2019; 2023

Serbia competed at the 2019 Military World Games held in Wuhan, China from 18 to 27 October 2019. In total, athletes representing Serbia won three bronze medals and the country finished in 54th place in the medal table.

== Medal summary ==
=== Medal by sports ===
Medals by sport
Sport	1st place, gold medalist(s)	2nd place, silver medalist(s)	3rd place, bronze medalist(s)	Total
Shooting	0	0	1	1
Wrestling	0	0	2	2

=== Medalists ===
Medal	Name	Sport	Event
Bronze	Sanja Vukašinović	Shooting	50m Rifle 3 Positions Women Individual
Bronze	Mate Nemeš	Wrestling	Men's Greco-Roman 67 kg
Bronze	Viktor Nemeš	Wrestling	Men's Greco-Roman 77 kg
