= Modern pentathlon at the 2019 Military World Games =

- Dates: 22–26 October

Modern pentathlon at the 2019 Military World Games was held in Wuhan, China from 22 to 26 October 2019.

== Medal summary ==
| Event | Gold | Silver | Bronze |
|---|---|---|---|
| Men individual | Alexander Lifanov; Russia | Lee Ji-hun; South Korea | Kirill Kasyanik; Belarus |
| Men team | Russia | South Korea | Poland |
| Women individual | Élodie Clouvel; France | Gulnaz Gubaydullina; Russia | Salma Abdelmaksoud; Egypt |
| Women team | China | Russia | Poland |
| Mixed relay | Egypt | Hungary | China |
