= Canada at the 2019 Military World Games =

- Flag of Canada
- IOC code: CAN

in Wuhan, China 18 October 2019 – 27 October 2019
- Medals Ranked 43rd: Gold 0 Silver 1 Bronze 2 Total 3

Military World Games appearances
- 1995; 1999; 2003; 2007; 2011; 2015; 2019; 2023

Canada competed at the 2019 Military World Games held in Wuhan, China from 18 to 27 October 2019. In total, athletes representing Canada won one silver and two bronze medals and the country finished in 43rd place in the medal table.

== Medal summary ==
=== Medal by sports ===
Medals by sport
Sport	1st place, gold medalist(s)	2nd place, silver medalist(s)	3rd place, bronze medalist(s)	Total
Taekwondo	0	1	2	3

=== Medalists ===
Medal	Name	Sport	Event
Silver	Yong Yvette Hui Hua	Taekwondo	Women's -46 kg
Bronze	Jordan Isaiah Drake Stewart	Taekwondo	Men's -87 kg
Bronze	Ashley Kraayeveld	Taekwondo	Women's -62 kg
