= Sweden at the 2019 Military World Games =

- Flag of Sweden
- IOC code: SWE

in Wuhan, China 18 October 2019 – 27 October 2019
- Medals Ranked 43rd: Gold 0 Silver 1 Bronze 2 Total 3

Military World Games appearances
- 1995; 1999; 2003; 2007; 2011; 2015; 2019; 2023

Sweden competed at the 2019 Military World Games held in Wuhan, China from 18 to 27 October 2019. In total, athletes representing Sweden won one silver and two bronze medals and the country finished in 43rd place in the medal table. All medals were won in the naval pentathlon event.

== Medal summary ==
=== Medal by sports ===
Medals by sport
Sport	1st place, gold medalist(s)	2nd place, silver medalist(s)	3rd place, bronze medalist(s)	Total
Naval pentathlon	0	1	2	3

=== Medalists ===
Medal	Name	Sport	Event
Silver	Women's team	Naval pentathlon	Women team
Bronze	Cecilia Sjoeholm	Naval pentathlon	Women individual
Bronze	Women's team	Naval pentathlon	Women's obstacle relay
