= He Junyi =

Chinese swimmer (born 1997)

Personal information
- Nationality: Chinese
- Born: 2 August 1997 (age 28)
- Height: 195 cm (6 ft 5 in)
- Weight: 80 kg (176 lb)

Sport
- Sport: Swimming
Medal record
Men's Swimming
Representing China
Asian Games
Gold medal – first place	2018 Jakarta	4×100 m medley
Military World Games
Gold medal – first place	2019 Wuhan	4×200 m freestyle
Gold medal – first place	2019 Wuhan	4×100 m mixed freestyle
Silver medal – second place	2019 Wuhan	4×100 m freestyle
Silver medal – second place	2019 Wuhan	4×100 m medley
Bronze medal – third place	2019 Wuhan	50 m freestyle

He Junyi (Chinese: 何峻毅, born 2 August 1997) is a Chinese swimmer and a national record holder in swimming.

== Career ==
He represented China at the 2018 Asian Games, which was his first appearance at the Asian Games, and claimed the gold medal in the men's 4 × 100 m medley relay event.

He competed for China at the 2019 World Aquatics Championships, and he also took part at the 2019 Military World Games and claimed five medals in the swimming event, including a gold in the men's 4 × 200m freestyle relay event.

== Personal bests ==
As of 30 July 2021

=== Long course (50-meter pool) ===
Event	Time	Meet	Date	Note(s)
50 m freestyle	22.60	2018 Chinese National Swimming Championships	13 April 2018	
100 m freestyle	48.10	2019 Chinese National Swimming Championships	28 March 2019	
200 m freestyle	1.48.33	2019 Chinese National Swimming Championships	26 March 2019	
400 m freestyle	3.58.62	2017 Chinese National Swimming Championships	23 June 2017	
1500 m freestyle	15.53.64	2017 Chinese National Swimming Championships	14 October 2017	

=== Short course (25-meter pool) ===
Event	Time	Meet	Date	Note(s)
50 m freestyle	22.06	2018 Swimming World Cup	2 November 2018	
100 m freestyle	47.54	2018 Swimming World Cup	3 November 2018	
