= Li Guangyuan =

Chinese swimmer (born 1997)

Personal information
- Full name: Li Guangyuan (李广源)
- National team: China
- Born: 27 February 1997 (age 29) Taizhou, Zhejiang, China
- Height: 1.87 m (6 ft 2 in)
- Weight: 81 kg (179 lb)

Sport
- Sport: Swimming
- Strokes: backstroke
- Club: Zhejiang Swimming Team
Medal record
Men's swimming
Representing China
World Championships (LC)
Bronze medal – third place	2017 Budapest	4×100 m mixed medley
Asian Games
Gold medal – first place	2018 Jakarta	4×100 m medley
Gold medal – first place	2018 Jakarta	4×100 m mixed medley
Military World Games
Gold medal – first place	2019 Wuhan	100 m backstroke
Gold medal – first place	2019 Wuhan	200 m backstroke
Gold medal – first place	2019 Wuhan	4x100 m mixed medley
Silver medal – second place	2019 Wuhan	4×100 m medley

Li Guangyuan
- Traditional Chinese: 李廣源
- Simplified Chinese: 李广源
Transcriptions
Standard Mandarin
- Hanyu Pinyin: Lǐ Guǎng Yuán

Li Guangyuan (simplified Chinese: 李广源; traditional Chinese: 李廣源; pinyin: Lǐ Guǎng Yuán; born 27 February 1997) is a Chinese swimmer. He competed in the men's 100 metre backstroke event at the 2016 Summer Olympics.

== Career best times ==
=== Long course (50-meter pool) ===
Event	Time	Meet	Date	Note(s)
50 m backstroke	25.28	2019 Chinese National Championships	31 March 2019	
100 m backstroke	53.59	2017 National Games of China	1 September 2017	
200 m backstroke	1:55.53	2017 Chinese National Championships	8 April 2017	
50m freestyle	24.87	2014 Youth Olympic Games	19 August 2014	
100m freestyle	50.32	2016 Chinese National Championships	3 April 2016	
200m freestyle	1:50.92	2018 Chinese National Championships	22 June 2018	
50m butterfly	25.01	2019 Swimming World Cup	8 August 2019	
100m butterfly	54.78	2019 Swimming World Cup	8 August 2019	
200m butterfly	2:05.35	2019 Swimming World Cup	9 August 2019	
200m individual medley	2:07.70	2021 Chinese National Championships	4 June 2021	

=== Short course (25-meter pool) ===
Event	Time	Meet	Date	Note(s)
50 m backstroke	24.69	2018 World Swimming Championships	16 December 2018	
100 m backstroke	51.60	2018 Swimming World Cup	4 November 2018	
200 m backstroke	1:52.82	2017 Swimming World Cup	11 November 2017	
50 m butterfly	24.04	2016 Swimming World Cup	1 October 2016	
100 m butterfly	52.01	2016 Swimming World Cup	1 October 2016	
100 m individual medley	55.64	2016 Swimming World Cup	30 September 2016	
