= Lu Pinpin =

Chinese military officer and athlete

- 卢嫔嫔
- Born: 23 October 1996 (age 29)
- Citizenship: Chinese
- Occupations: Army personnel, military pentathlete
- Known for: world record holder in women's 500m military pentathlon obstacle race

Lu Pinpin (Chinese: 卢嫔嫔; born 23 October 1996) is a Chinese military officer and pentathlete who serves as a corporal in the People's Liberation Army. She took part in the military pentathlon event at the 2019 Military World Games and she shattered the world record in the women's 500m obstacle course on 20 October 2019 with a record timing of 2 minutes and 10.9 seconds.
