= Mykyta Koptielov =

Ukrainian swimmer

Personal information
- Nationality: Ukrainian
- Born: 12 October 1999 (age 26)

Sport
- Sport: Swimming

Mykyta Koptielov (born 12 October 1999) is a Ukrainian swimmer. He competed in the men's 100 metre breaststroke event at the 2018 FINA World Swimming Championships (25 m), in Hangzhou, China. He also competed in the men's 200 metre breaststroke event. In 2019, he won the bronze medal in the men's 200 metre breaststroke event at the 2019 Military World Games held in Wuhan, China.
