= Anna Ilina =

Ukrainian sports shooter (born 1997)

Personal information
- Height: 170 cm (5 ft 7 in)
- Weight: 60 kg (132 lb)

Sport
- Country: Ukraine
- Sport: Sports shooting
Medal record
Women's shooting
Representing Ukraine
European Championships
Bronze medal – third place	2018 Győr	Air rifle mixed team
Military Games
Gold medal – first place	2019 Wuhan	50m Rifle Prone Women Team
Silver medal – second place	2019 Wuhan	50m Rifle 3 Positions Women Team
European Junior Championships
Gold medal – first place	2017 Baku	50m Rifle 3 Positions

Anna Ilina (Ukrainian: Анна Іліна; born 1997) is a Ukrainian sports shooter. She is medalist of European Championships.
