= Brazil at the 2019 Military World Games =

- Flag of Brazil
- IOC code: BRA

in Wuhan, China 18 October 2019 – 27 October 2019
- Medals Ranked 3rd: Gold 21 Silver 31 Bronze 36 Total 88

Military World Games appearances (overview)
- 1995; 1999; 2003; 2007; 2011; 2015; 2019; 2023

Brazil competed at the 2019 Military World Games held in Wuhan, China from 18 to 27 October 2019. In total, athletes representing Brazil won 21 gold medals, 31 silver medals and 36 bronze medals. The country finished in 3rd place in the medal table.

== Medal summary ==
=== Medal by sports ===
Medals by sport
Sport	1st place, gold medalist(s)	2nd place, silver medalist(s)	3rd place, bronze medalist(s)	Total
Aeronautical pentathlon	0	3	0	3
Athletics	4	5	2	11
Basketball	0	1	0	1
Boxing	0	2	0	2
Diving	0	1	2	3
Equestrian	0	1	0	1
Football	0	0	1	1
Golf	4	0	1	5
Judo	1	1	4	6
Lifesaving	1	1	8	10
Military pentathlon	0	0	2	2
Naval pentathlon	0	3	1	4
Open water swimming	1	1	2	4
Sailing	1	0	0	1
Swimming	4	9	6	19
Taekwondo	2	1	3	6
Triathlon	1	1	2	4
Volleyball	2	1	0	3
Wrestling	0	0	1	1

=== Medalists ===
Medal	Name	Sport	Event
Gold	Women's team	Volleyball	Women's tournament
Gold	Bruno Oscar Schmidt; Evandro Oliveira	Beach volleyball	Men's tournament
Gold	A. Barbachan; G. Dzioubanov	Sailing	Mixed 470 Class Race
Silver	Frederico Brito	Aeronautical pentathlon	Flying contest
Silver	Andre Kuroswiski; Joel Belo; Frederico Brito; Ariel Kaczmark	Aeronautical pentathlon	Men team
Silver	Mayara Silva; Ellen Souza; Mariana Laporte	Aeronautical pentathlon	Women team
Silver	Women's team	Basketball	Women's tournament
Silver	Hebert Sousa	Boxing	Men's -75 kg
Silver	Beatriz Iasmim Ferreira	Boxing	Women's -60 kg
Silver	Taiana Lima; Talita Antunes	Beach volleyball	Women's tournament
Bronze	Laís Nunes	Wrestling	Women's freestyle 62 kg
