= Park Jun-woo =

South Korean sport shooter

Personal information
- Nationality: South Korean
- Born: 28 October 1995 (age 30)

Sport
- Country: South Korea
- Sport: Shooting
- Event: Air pistol
Medal record
World Championships
Bronze medal – third place	2018 Changwon	25 m team rapid fire pistol

Park Jun-woo (born 28 October 1995) is a South Korean sport shooter.

He participated at the 2018 ISSF World Shooting Championships, winning a medal.
