= Kim Jin-il (sport shooter) =

South Korean sport shooter

Personal information
- Nationality: South Korean
- Born: 12 July 1981 (age 44)

Sport
- Country: South Korea
- Sport: Shooting
- Event: Air pistol
Medal record
World Championships
Gold medal – first place	2018 Changwon	25 m team center fire pistol

Kim Jin-il (born 12 July 1981) is a South Korean sport shooter.

He participated at the 2018 ISSF World Shooting Championships, winning a medal.
