= Romania at the 2019 Military World Games =

- Flag of Romania
- IOC code: ROU

Military World Games appearances
- 1995; 1999; 2003; 2007; 2011; 2015; 2019; 2023

Romania competed at the 2019 Military World Games held in Wuhan, China from 18 to 27 October 2019.

== Medal summary ==
=== Medal by sports ===
Medals by sport
Sport	1st place, gold medalist(s)	2nd place, silver medalist(s)	3rd place, bronze medalist(s)	Total
Fencing	0	1	0	1
Judo	0	1	0	1

=== Medalists ===
Medal	Name	Sport	Event
Silver	Ana Maria Popescu	Fencing	Women's Individual Épée
Silver	Andreea Chițu	Judo	Women -57 kg
