= China at the 2019 Military World Games =

- IOC code: CHN
- NOC: Chinese Olympic Committee

in Wuhan, China 18 October - 27 October
- Competitors: 553
- Flag bearer: Yuan Xinyue
- Medals Ranked 1st: Gold 133 Silver 64 Bronze 42 Total 239

Military World Games appearances
- 1995; 1999; 2003; 2007; 2011; 2015; 2019; 2023

China competed as hosts at the 2019 Military World Games in Wuhan from 18 to 27 October 2019. This was the nation's 7th successive appearance at the Military World Games. China sent a delegation consisting of 553 athletes for the games, which was also the highest number of athletes sent by a nation at the Military World Games. Volleyball player Yuan Xinyue was the flagbearer during the opening ceremony. China finished the event with 239 medals and topped the medal table.

== Basketball ==
=== Men's tournament ===
October 19, 2019
:

China	104–71	Mongolia

Wuhan Hongshan Gymnasium, Wuhan

October 20, 2019
:

United States	79–98	China

Wuhan Hongshan Gymnasium, Wuhan

October 22, 2019
:

China	92–62	Congo

Wuhan Hongshan Gymnasium, Wuhan

October 23, 2019
:

Qatar	64–80	China

Wuhan Hongshan Gymnasium, Wuhan

== Volleyball ==
=== Men's tournament ===
==== Group stage ====
October 21, 2019; 19:30 UTC+8	Venezuela	0–3	China	Jianghan University Gymnasium, Wuhan; Attendance: 985; Referees: William Thornburgh (USA), Steven Georgestuart (CAN)
October 21, 2019; 19:30 UTC+8	(16–25, 13–25, 21–25)			Jianghan University Gymnasium, Wuhan; Attendance: 985; Referees: William Thornburgh (USA), Steven Georgestuart (CAN)

October 22, 2019 --:-- UTC+8	China	3-0	Brazil	Jianghan University Gymnasium, Wuhan

October 24, 2019 --:-- UTC+8	Qatar	3-0	China	Jianghan University Gymnasium, Wuhan

=== Semi-finals ===
October 25, 2019; 19:30 UTC+8	China	3–0	Pakistan	Jianghan University Gymnasium, Wuhan; Attendance: 3,000; Referees: Ralph Barnstorf (GER), Samara Alexandra Sevor (CAN)
October 25, 2019; 19:30 UTC+8	(27–25, 25–15, 25–19)			Jianghan University Gymnasium, Wuhan; Attendance: 3,000; Referees: Ralph Barnstorf (GER), Samara Alexandra Sevor (CAN)

=== Gold medal match ===
October 26, 2019; 19:30 UTC+8	South Korea	1–3	China	Jianghan University Gymnasium, Wuhan; Attendance: 1,550; Referees: William Thornburgh (USA), Ralph Barnstorf (GER)
October 26, 2019; 19:30 UTC+8	(23–25, 19–25, 25–19, 21–25)			Jianghan University Gymnasium, Wuhan; Attendance: 1,550; Referees: William Thornburgh (USA), Ralph Barnstorf (GER)

=== Women's tournament ===
==== Group stage ====
October 16, 2019; 19:30 UTC+8	China	3–0	United States	Jianghan University Gymnasium, Wuhan; Attendance: 1,084; Referees: Janita Richter (GER), Jang Jong Hyang (PRK)
October 16, 2019; 19:30 UTC+8	(25–10, 25–9, 25–16)			Jianghan University Gymnasium, Wuhan; Attendance: 1,084; Referees: Janita Richter (GER), Jang Jong Hyang (PRK)

October 17, 2019; 19:30 UTC+8	China	3–0	Brazil	Jianghan University Gymnasium, Wuhan; Attendance: 1,550; Referees: Ralph Barnstorf (GER), William Thornburgh (USA)
October 17, 2019; 19:30 UTC+8	(25–17, 25–16, 25–21)			Jianghan University Gymnasium, Wuhan; Attendance: 1,550; Referees: Ralph Barnstorf (GER), William Thornburgh (USA)

October 20, 2019; 19:30 UTC+8	Canada	0–3	China	Wuhan Sports Center Gymnasium, Wuhan; Attendance: 11,000; Referees: William Thornburgh (USA), Gerard Broekema (NED)
October 20, 2019; 19:30 UTC+8	(11–25, 5–25, 19–25)			Wuhan Sports Center Gymnasium, Wuhan; Attendance: 11,000; Referees: William Thornburgh (USA), Gerard Broekema (NED)

==== Semi finals ====
October 21, 2019; 19:30 UTC+8	China	3–0	Germany	Wuhan Sports Center Gymnasium, Wuhan; Attendance: 9,000; Referees: Christophe Fourel (FRA), Jang Jong Hyang (PRK)
October 21, 2019; 19:30 UTC+8	(25–12, 25–8, 25–9)			Wuhan Sports Center Gymnasium, Wuhan; Attendance: 9,000; Referees: Christophe Fourel (FRA), Jang Jong Hyang (PRK)

==== Gold medal match ====
October 22, 2019 --:-- UTC+8	Brazil	3-1	China	Wuhan Sports Center Gymnasium, Wuhan

== Medal summary ==
=== Medal by sports ===
Medals by sport
Sport	1st place, gold medalist(s)	2nd place, silver medalist(s)	3rd place, bronze medalist(s)	Total
Fencing	1	1	0	2
Aeronautical pentathlon	1	0	0	1
Cycling	2	0	1	3
Swimming	19	9	6	34
Gymnastics	1	1	0	2
Equestrian	0	0	1	1
Lifesaving	8	3	0	11
Judo	4	2	2	8
Parachuting	2	1	0	3
Table tennis	1	0	0	1
Shooting	5	0	2	7
Wrestling	0	0	1	1
Total	33	21	28	82

=== Medalists ===
Medal	Name	Sport	Event
Gold	Liao Weihua	Aeronautical Pentathlon	
Gold	Zhendong Fan; Kai Zhou; Yu Zhou	Table Tennis	men's team
Gold	Zhao Xisha	Cycling	women's individual road race
Gold	Liang Hongyu	Cycling	women's individual time trial
Gold	Sun Yiwen	Fencing	women's Épée
Gold	Chen Chen	Judo	women's 48 kg
Gold	Huang Liru	Judo	women's 52 kg
Gold	Zhaonan Yao; Yongde Jin; Zhenxiang Xie	Shooting	women's team
Gold	Li Guangyuan	Swimming	men's 100m backstroke
Gold	Ji Xinjie	Swimming	men's 200m freestyle
Gold	Wang Shun	Swimming	men's 200m individual medley
Gold	Wang Shun	Swimming	men's 400m individual medley
Gold	He Junyi; Wang Shun; Ji Xinjie; Liu Shaofang	Swimming	men's 4 × 200 m freestyle relay

== Records ==
Lu Pinpin set the world record in women's 500m obstacle race during the military pentathlon event.

== Controversy ==
Chinese orienteering teams comprising both men and women counterparts were disqualified and their results were also rejected by the event organizers citing cheating offenses on the athletes for using illegal secret paths and markings with the assistance of spectators to claim medals in the individual middle distance events. China originally claimed a gold and a silver medal in women's category as well as a silver in men's category prior to the disqualification. The issue was later notified by the International Orienteering Federation announced officially that the medals won't be counted as part of the multi-sport event and clarified on the disqualification of the Chinese athletes.
