= France at the 2019 Military World Games =

- Flag of France
- IOC code: FRA

in Wuhan, China 18 October 2019 – 27 October 2019
- Medals: Gold 0 Silver 0 Bronze 0 Total 0

Military World Games appearances
- 1995; 1999; 2003; 2007; 2011; 2015; 2019; 2023

France competed at the 2019 Military World Games held in Wuhan, China, from 18 to 27 October 2019.

== Medal summary ==
=== Medal by sports ===
Medals by sport
| Sport | 1st place, gold medalist(s) | 2nd place, silver medalist(s) | 3rd place, bronze medalist(s) | Total |
|---|---|---|---|---|
| Equestrian | 0 | 0 | 1 | 1 |
| Fencing | 0 | 3 | 1 | 4 |
| Modern pentathlon | 1 | 0 | 0 | 1 |

=== Medalists ===
| Medal | Name | Sport | Event |
|---|---|---|---|
| Gold | Élodie Clouvel | Modern pentathlon | Women individual |
| Silver | Maxime Pauty | Fencing | Men's Individual Foil |
| Silver | Enzo Lefort; Maxime Pauty; Alexandre Sido | Fencing | Men's Team Foil |
| Silver | Pauline Ranvier | Fencing | Women's Individual Foil |
| Bronze | Benjamin Courtat; Le Grix de la Salle; Chloe Hardy | Equestrian | Jumping team |
| Bronze | Anita Blaze | Fencing | Women's Individual Foil |
