= Italy at the 2019 Military World Games =

- Flag of Italy
- IOC code: ITA

in Wuhan, China 18 October 2019 – 27 October 2019
- Medals: Gold 0 Silver 0 Bronze 0 Total 0

Military World Games appearances (overview)
- 1995; 1999; 2003; 2007; 2011; 2015; 2019; 2023

Italy competed at the 2019 Military World Games held in Wuhan, China from 18 to 27 October 2019.

== Medal summary ==
=== Medal by sports ===
Medals by sport
Sport	1st place, gold medalist(s)	2nd place, silver medalist(s)	3rd place, bronze medalist(s)	Total
Athletics	0	1	0	1
Diving	0	0	1	1
Taekwondo	0	0	1	1

=== Medalists ===
Medal	Name	Sport	Event
Silver	Ottavia Cestonaro	Athletics	Women triple jump
Bronze	Tommaso Rinaldi; Gabrile Auber	Diving	Men synchronized 3 m springboard
Bronze	Maristella Smiraglia	Taekwondo	Women -73 kg
