= Poland at the 2019 Military World Games =

- Flag of Poland
- IOC code: POL

Military World Games appearances
- 1995; 1999; 2003; 2007; 2011; 2015; 2019; 2023

Poland competed at the 2019 Military World Games held in Wuhan, China from 18 to 27 October 2019.

== Medal summary ==
=== Medal by sports ===
Medals by sport
| Sport | 1st place, gold medalist(s) | 2nd place, silver medalist(s) | 3rd place, bronze medalist(s) | Total |
|---|---|---|---|---|
| Fencing | 0 | 0 | 4 | 4 |
| Modern Pentathlon | 0 | 0 | 1 | 1 |

=== Medalists ===
| Medal | Name | Sport | Event |
|---|---|---|---|
| Bronze | Magdalena Piekarska | Fencing | Women's Individual Épée |
| Bronze | Julia Walczyk | Fencing | Women's Individual Foil |
| Bronze | Bogna Jóźwiak; Hanna Łyczbińska; Martyna Synoradzka; Julia Walczyk | Fencing | Women's Team Foil |
| Bronze | Małgorzata Kozaczuk | Fencing | Women's Individual Sabre |
| Bronze | Anna Maliszewska, Natalia Hachulaska, Natalia Dominiak, Oktawia Nowacka | Modern Pentathlon | Women's Team |
