= Germany at the 2019 Military World Games =

- Flag of Germany
- IOC code: GER

Military World Games appearances
- 1995; 1999; 2003; 2007; 2011; 2015; 2019; 2023

Germany competed at the 2019 Military World Games held in Wuhan, China from 18 to 27 October 2019.

== Medal summary ==
=== Medal by sports ===
Medals by sport
Sport	1st place, gold medalist(s)	2nd place, silver medalist(s)	3rd place, bronze medalist(s)	Total
Athletics	0	0	1	1
Fencing	1	0	1	2

=== Medalists ===
Medal	Name	Sport	Event
Gold	Richard Hübers	Fencing	Men's Individual Sabre
Bronze	Teresa Zurek	Athletics	Women's 20 kilometres walk
Bronze	Björn Hübner	Fencing	Men's Individual Sabre
