= List of universities and colleges in Hubei =

As of 2022, Hubei hosts 130 institutions of higher education, ranking sixth together with Hunan (130) among all Chinese provinces after Jiangsu (168), Guangdong (160), Henan (156), Shandong (153), and Sichuan (134). The following is List of Universities and Colleges in Hubei.

== Public ==
- Huazhong University of Science and Technology (HUST)
- Wuhan University (WHU)
- Wuhan University of Technology (WUT)
- China University of Geosciences (CUG)
- Central China Agricultural University (HAU /HZAU Huazhong Agricultural University)
- Central China Normal University (CCNU Huazhong Normal University)
- Zhongnan University of Economics and Law (ZUEL)
- South-Central University for Nationalities

== Wuhan ==
- Hubei University
- Wuhan University of Science and Technology
- Wuhan Textile University
- Wuhan Institute of Technology
- Wuhan University of Science and Engineering (武汉科技学院)
- Wuhan Polytechnic University
- Hubei University of Technology
- Hubei College of Traditional Chinese Medicine
- Wuhan Institute of Physical Education
- Hubei Institute of Fine Arts
- Jianghan University
- Hubei University of Police (湖北警官学院)
- Wuhan Conservatory of Music
- Hubei University of Economics (湖北经济学院)
- Hubei University of Education (湖北第二师范学院)
- Wuhan Vocational College of Software and Engineering
- Wuhan Technical College of Communications (武汉交通职业学院)
- Wuhan Technical University (武汉职业技术大学)
- Wuhan Foreign Languages School (武汉外国语学校)

== Xiangyang ==
- Hubei University of Arts and Science

== Jingzhou ==
- Yangtze University

== Enshi Tujia and Miao Autonomous Prefecture|Enshi ==
- Hubei University for Nationalities (湖北民族学院)

== Xiaogan ==
- Hubei Engineering University (湖北工程学院)

== Yichang ==
- China Three Gorges University

== Shiyan ==
- Hubei University of Medicine
- Hubei University of Automotive Technology (湖北汽车工业学院)
- Hubei Industrial Polytechnic (湖北工业职业技术学院)
- Hanjiang Normal University (汉江师范学院)

== Huanggang ==
- Huanggang Normal University

== Huangshi ==
- Hubei Institute of Technology (湖北理工学院)
- Hubei Normal University (湖北师范大学)

== Jingmen ==
- Jingchu University of Technology (荆楚理工学院)

== Xianning ==
- Hubei University of Science and Technology (湖北科技学院)
