= Beach volleyball at the 2019 Military World Games – Women's tournament =

Women's Beach Volleyball at the 2019 Military World Games
- Venue: Hanyang District Beach Volleyball Center
- Date: 21 – 26 October
- Competitors: 22 from 6 nations

Medalists
gold medal	Wang Fan (CHN); Xia Xinyi (CHN)
silver medal	Taiana Lima (BRA); Talita Antunes (BRA)
bronze medal	Nadezda Makroguzova (RUS); Daria Rudykh (RUS)

The Women's Beach Volleyball tournament at the 2019 Military World Games was held in Wuhan, China from 21 to 26 October.

== Preliminary round ==
=== Group A ===
Pos	Team	Pld	W	L	Pts	SW	SL	SR	SPW	SPL	SPR	Qualification
1	(China) Wang – Xia	2	2	0	4	4	0	MAX	84	51	1.647	Quarter-finals
2	(China) Bai – Yuan	2	1	1	3	2	2	1.000	71	60	1.183	Quarter-finals
3	(Germany) Krebs – Welsch	2	0	2	2	0	4	0.000	40	84	0.476	

October 21, 2019; 17:00 UTC+8	Bai – Yuan (China)	2–0	(Germany) Krebs – Welsch	Hanyang District Beach Volleyball Center, Wuhan; Attendance: 550; Referees: Hamed Alriyami (OMA), Pavel Remizov (RUS)
October 21, 2019; 17:00 UTC+8	(21–10, 21–8)			Hanyang District Beach Volleyball Center, Wuhan; Attendance: 550; Referees: Hamed Alriyami (OMA), Pavel Remizov (RUS)

October 22, 2019; 18:00 UTC+8	Wang – Xia (China)	2–0	(Germany) Krebs – Welsch	Hanyang District Beach Volleyball Center, Wuhan; Attendance: 100; Referees: Ernani Santos (BRA), Hamed Alriyami (OMA)
October 22, 2019; 18:00 UTC+8	(21–8, 21–14)			Hanyang District Beach Volleyball Center, Wuhan; Attendance: 100; Referees: Ernani Santos (BRA), Hamed Alriyami (OMA)

October 23, 2019; 18:00 UTC+8	Wang – Xia (China)	2–0	(China) Bai – Yuan	Hanyang District Beach Volleyball Center, Wuhan; Attendance: 310; Referees: Wang Lei (CHN), Liu Hongyu (CHN)
October 23, 2019; 18:00 UTC+8	(21–19, 21–10)			Hanyang District Beach Volleyball Center, Wuhan; Attendance: 310; Referees: Wang Lei (CHN), Liu Hongyu (CHN)

=== Group B ===
Pos	Team	Pld	W	L	Pts	SW	SL	SR	SPW	SPL	SPR	Qualification
1	(Brazil) Rippel – Lisboa	3	3	0	6	6	0	MAX	126	78	1.615	Quarter-finals
2	(China) Lin – Zhu	3	2	1	5	4	2	2.000	115	92	1.250	Quarter-finals
3	(Germany) Schneider – Koertzinger	3	1	2	4	2	4	0.500	106	107	0.991	Quarter-finals
4	(Rwanda) Munezero – Musabyiwana	3	0	3	3	0	6	0.000	56	126	0.444	

October 21, 2019; 15:00 UTC+8	Rippel – Lisboa (Brazil)	2–0	(Rwanda) Munezero – Musabyiwana	Hanyang District Beach Volleyball Center, Wuhan; Attendance: 550; Referees: Wei Yun (CHN), Wang Lei (CHN)
October 21, 2019; 15:00 UTC+8	(21–8, 21–5)			Hanyang District Beach Volleyball Center, Wuhan; Attendance: 550; Referees: Wei Yun (CHN), Wang Lei (CHN)

October 21, 2019; 16:00 UTC+8	Schneider – Koertzinger (Germany)	0–2	(China) Lin – Zhu	Hanyang District Beach Volleyball Center, Wuhan; Attendance: 550; Referees: Pavel Remizov (RUS), Ernani Santos (BRA)
October 21, 2019; 16:00 UTC+8	(14–21, 16–21)			Hanyang District Beach Volleyball Center, Wuhan; Attendance: 550; Referees: Pavel Remizov (RUS), Ernani Santos (BRA)

October 22, 2019; 16:00 UTC+8	Rippel – Lisboa (Brazil)	2–0	(China) Lin – Zhu	Hanyang District Beach Volleyball Center, Wuhan; Attendance: 550; Referees: Pavel Remizov (RUS), Hamed Alriyami (OMA)
October 22, 2019; 16:00 UTC+8	(21–15, 21–16)			Hanyang District Beach Volleyball Center, Wuhan; Attendance: 550; Referees: Pavel Remizov (RUS), Hamed Alriyami (OMA)

October 22, 2019; 17:00 UTC+8	Schneider – Koertzinger (Germany)	2–0	(Rwanda) Munezero – Musabyiwana	Hanyang District Beach Volleyball Center, Wuhan; Attendance: 100; Referees: Liu Yue (CHN), Yu Yang (CHN)
October 22, 2019; 17:00 UTC+8	(21–8, 21–15)			Hanyang District Beach Volleyball Center, Wuhan; Attendance: 100; Referees: Liu Yue (CHN), Yu Yang (CHN)

October 23, 2019; 16:00 UTC+8	Rippel – Lisboa (Brazil)	2–0	(Germany) Schneider – Koertzinger	Hanyang District Beach Volleyball Center, Wuhan; Attendance: 500; Referees: Hu Xuan (CHN), Chen Wenping (CHN)
October 23, 2019; 16:00 UTC+8	(21–17, 21–17)			Hanyang District Beach Volleyball Center, Wuhan; Attendance: 500; Referees: Hu Xuan (CHN), Chen Wenping (CHN)

October 23, 2019; 17:00 UTC+8	Lin – Zhu (China)	2–0	(Rwanda) Munezero – Musabyiwana	Hanyang District Beach Volleyball Center, Wuhan; Attendance: 550; Referees: Ernani Santos (BRA), Hamed Alriyami (OMA)
October 23, 2019; 17:00 UTC+8	(21–8, 21–12)			Hanyang District Beach Volleyball Center, Wuhan; Attendance: 550; Referees: Ernani Santos (BRA), Hamed Alriyami (OMA)

=== Group C ===
Pos	Team	Pld	W	L	Pts	SW	SL	SR	SPW	SPL	SPR	Qualification
1	(Brazil) Taiana Lima – Talita	3	3	0	6	6	1	6.000	137	89	1.539	Quarter-finals
2	(Russia) Makroguzova – Rudykh	3	2	1	5	5	2	2.500	132	116	1.138	Quarter-finals
3	(China) Jiang – Zhao	3	1	2	4	2	4	0.500	107	117	0.915	Quarter-finals
4	(Sri Lanka) Alawaththage – Bogahalanda	3	0	3	3	0	6	0.000	72	126	0.571	

October 21, 2019; 09:00 UTC+8	Taiana Lima – Talita (Brazil)	2–0	(Sri Lanka) Alawaththage – Bogahalanda	Hanyang District Beach Volleyball Center, Wuhan; Attendance: 396; Referees: Liu Hongyu (CHN), Song Xiaojun (CHN)
October 21, 2019; 09:00 UTC+8	(21–6, 21–9)			Hanyang District Beach Volleyball Center, Wuhan; Attendance: 396; Referees: Liu Hongyu (CHN), Song Xiaojun (CHN)

October 21, 2019; 10:00 UTC+8	Makroguzova – Rudykh (Russia)	2–0	(China) Jiang – Zhao	Hanyang District Beach Volleyball Center, Wuhan; Attendance: 356; Referees: Ernani Santos (BRA), Shen Xianghong (CHN)
October 21, 2019; 10:00 UTC+8	(22–20, 21–18)			Hanyang District Beach Volleyball Center, Wuhan; Attendance: 356; Referees: Ernani Santos (BRA), Shen Xianghong (CHN)

October 22, 2019; 14:00 UTC+8	Taiana Lima – Talita (Brazil)	2–0	(China) Jiang – Zhao	Hanyang District Beach Volleyball Center, Wuhan; Attendance: 560; Referees: Hamed Alriyami (OMA), Pavel Remizov (RUS)
October 22, 2019; 14:00 UTC+8	(21–12, 21–15)			Hanyang District Beach Volleyball Center, Wuhan; Attendance: 560; Referees: Hamed Alriyami (OMA), Pavel Remizov (RUS)

October 22, 2019; 15:00 UTC+8	Makroguzova – Rudykh (Russia)	2–0	(Sri Lanka) Alawaththage – Bogahalanda	Hanyang District Beach Volleyball Center, Wuhan; Attendance: 550; Referees: Hu Xuan (CHN), Chen Yanzai (CHN)
October 22, 2019; 15:00 UTC+8	(21–12, 21–13)			Hanyang District Beach Volleyball Center, Wuhan; Attendance: 550; Referees: Hu Xuan (CHN), Chen Yanzai (CHN)

October 23, 2019; 14:00 UTC+8	Taiana Lima – Talita (Brazil)	2–1	(Russia) Makroguzova – Rudykh	Hanyang District Beach Volleyball Center, Wuhan; Attendance: 510; Referees: Shen Xianghong (CHN), Liu Yue (CHN)
October 23, 2019; 14:00 UTC+8	(21–15, 17–21, 15–11)			Hanyang District Beach Volleyball Center, Wuhan; Attendance: 510; Referees: Shen Xianghong (CHN), Liu Yue (CHN)

October 23, 2019; 15:00 UTC+8	Jiang – Zhao (China)	2–0	(Sri Lanka) Alawaththage – Bogahalanda	Hanyang District Beach Volleyball Center, Wuhan; Attendance: 550; Referees: Pavel Remizov (RUS), Ernani Santos (BRA)
October 23, 2019; 15:00 UTC+8	(21–18, 21–14)			Hanyang District Beach Volleyball Center, Wuhan; Attendance: 550; Referees: Pavel Remizov (RUS), Ernani Santos (BRA)

== Final Round ==
=== Bracket ===
Quarter-finals
24 October
Wang – Xia (CHN)	2
Schneider – Koertzinger (GER)	1
24 October
Bai – Yuan (CHN)	0
Makroguzova – Rudykh (RUS)	2
24 October
Taiana Lima – Talita (BRA)	2
Lin – Zhu (CHN)	0
24 October
Rippel – Lisboa (BRA)	1
Jiang – Zhao (CHN)	2

Semi-finals
25 October
Wang – Xia (CHN)	2
Makroguzova – Rudykh (RUS)	0
25 October
Taiana Lima – Talita (BRA)	2
Jiang – Zhao (CHN)	0

Final
26 October
Wang – Xia (CHN)	2
Taiana Lima – Talita (BRA)	1
Bronze medal match
26 October
Makroguzova – Rudykh (RUS)	2
Jiang – Zhao (CHN)	0

=== Quarter-finals ===
October 24, 2019; 09:00 UTC+8	Wang – Xia (China)	2–1	(Germany) Schneider – Koertzinger	Hanyang District Beach Volleyball Center, Wuhan; Attendance: 560; Referees: Pavel Remizov (RUS), Ernani Santos (BRA)
October 24, 2019; 09:00 UTC+8	(21–14, 22–24, 20–18)			Hanyang District Beach Volleyball Center, Wuhan; Attendance: 560; Referees: Pavel Remizov (RUS), Ernani Santos (BRA)

October 24, 2019; 10:24 UTC+8	Bai – Yuan (China)	0–2	(Russia) Makroguzova – Rudykh	Hanyang District Beach Volleyball Center, Wuhan; Attendance: 550; Referees: Ernani Santos (BRA), Hamed Alriyami (OMA)
October 24, 2019; 10:24 UTC+8	(19–21, 19–21)			Hanyang District Beach Volleyball Center, Wuhan; Attendance: 550; Referees: Ernani Santos (BRA), Hamed Alriyami (OMA)

October 24, 2019; 11:20 UTC+8	Taiana Lima – Talita (Brazil)	2–0	(China) Lin – Zhu	Hanyang District Beach Volleyball Center, Wuhan; Attendance: 550; Referees: Pavel Remizov (RUS), Hamed Alriyami (OMA)
October 24, 2019; 11:20 UTC+8	(21–15, 22–20)			Hanyang District Beach Volleyball Center, Wuhan; Attendance: 550; Referees: Pavel Remizov (RUS), Hamed Alriyami (OMA)

October 24, 2019; 12:16 UTC+8	Rippel – Lisboa (Brazil)	1–2	(China) Jiang – Zhao	Hanyang District Beach Volleyball Center, Wuhan; Attendance: 450; Referees: Hamed Alriyami (OMA), Pavel Remizov (RUS)
October 24, 2019; 12:16 UTC+8	(19–21, 21–9, 9–15)			Hanyang District Beach Volleyball Center, Wuhan; Attendance: 450; Referees: Hamed Alriyami (OMA), Pavel Remizov (RUS)

=== Semi-finals ===
October 25, 2019; 15:00 UTC+8	Wang – Xia (China)	2–0	(Russia) Makroguzova – Rudykh	Hanyang District Beach Volleyball Center, Wuhan; Attendance: 570; Referees: Hamed Alriyami (OMA), Ernani Santos (BRA)
October 25, 2019; 15:00 UTC+8	(21–15, 21–13)			Hanyang District Beach Volleyball Center, Wuhan; Attendance: 570; Referees: Hamed Alriyami (OMA), Ernani Santos (BRA)

October 25, 2019; 16:00 UTC+8	Taiana Lima – Talita (Brazil)	2–0	(China) Jiang – Zhao	Hanyang District Beach Volleyball Center, Wuhan; Attendance: 550; Referees: Pavel Remizov (RUS), Hamed Alriyami (OMA)
October 25, 2019; 16:00 UTC+8	(21–11, 21–15)			Hanyang District Beach Volleyball Center, Wuhan; Attendance: 550; Referees: Pavel Remizov (RUS), Hamed Alriyami (OMA)

=== Bronze medal match ===
October 26, 2019; 15:00 UTC+8	Makroguzova – Rudykh (Russia)	2–0	(China) Jiang – Zhao	Hanyang District Beach Volleyball Center, Wuhan; Attendance: 1,100; Referees: Hamed Alriyami (OMA), Ernani Santos (BRA)
October 26, 2019; 15:00 UTC+8	(21–18, 21–16)			Hanyang District Beach Volleyball Center, Wuhan; Attendance: 1,100; Referees: Hamed Alriyami (OMA), Ernani Santos (BRA)

=== Gold medal match ===
October 26, 2019; 16:00 UTC+8	Wang – Xia (China)	2–1	(Brazil) Taiana Lima – Talita	Hanyang District Beach Volleyball Center, Wuhan; Attendance: 1,500; Referees: Pavel Remizov (RUS), Hamed Alriyami (OMA)
October 26, 2019; 16:00 UTC+8	(22–20, 12–21, 15–9)			Hanyang District Beach Volleyball Center, Wuhan; Attendance: 1,500; Referees: Pavel Remizov (RUS), Hamed Alriyami (OMA)

== Final standing ==
Rank	Team
1st place, gold medalist(s)	Wang Fan (CHN); Xia Xinyi (CHN)
2nd place, silver medalist(s)	Taiana Lima (BRA); Talita Antunes (BRA)
3rd place, bronze medalist(s)	Nadezda Makroguzova (RUS); Daria Rudykh (RUS)
4	Jiang Li (CHN); Zhao Huimin (CHN)
5	Ágatha Bednarczuk (BRA); Eduarda Lisboa (BRA)
6	Sarah Schneider (GER); Leonie Koertzinger (GER)
7	Bai Bing (CHN); Yuan Lüwen (CHN)
8	Lin Meimei (CHN); Zhu Lingdi (CHN)
9	Anika Krebs (GER); Leonie Welsch (GER)
10	Kasuni Alawaththage (SRI); Gnanasagari Bogahalanda (SRI)
11	Valentine Munezero (RWA); Penelope Musabyiwana (RWA)
