= Volleyball at the 2019 Military World Games – Women's tournament =

Women's Volleyball at the 2019 Military World Games
- Venue: Jianghan University Gymnasium; Wuhan Sports Center Gymnasium
- Date: 16 – 22 October
- Competitors: 96 from 8 nations

Medalists
gold medal	Brazil
silver medal	China
bronze medal	North Korea

The Women's Volleyball tournament at the 2019 Military World Games is held in Wuhan, China from 16 to 22 October.

== Preliminary round ==
=== Group A ===
Pos	Team	Pld	W	L	Pts	SW	SL	SR	SPW	SPL	SPR	Qualification
1	China	3	3	0	9	9	0	MAX	225	124	1.815	Semi-finals
2	Brazil	3	2	1	6	6	3	2.000	204	139	1.468	Semi-finals
3	Canada	3	1	2	2	3	8	0.375	179	260	0.688	
4	United States	3	0	3	1	2	9	0.222	175	260	0.673	

Updated to match(es) played on 20 October 2019. Source: CISM

October 16, 2019; 10:00 UTC+8	Brazil	3–0	Canada	Jianghan University Gymnasium, Wuhan; Attendance: 1,000; Referees: Wang Ziling (CHN), Ralph Barnstorf (GER)
October 16, 2019; 10:00 UTC+8	(25–12, 25–10, 25–12)			Jianghan University Gymnasium, Wuhan; Attendance: 1,000; Referees: Wang Ziling (CHN), Ralph Barnstorf (GER)

October 16, 2019; 19:30 UTC+8	China	3–0	United States	Jianghan University Gymnasium, Wuhan; Attendance: 1,084; Referees: Janita Richter (GER), Jang Jong Hyang (PRK)
October 16, 2019; 19:30 UTC+8	(25–10, 25–9, 25–16)			Jianghan University Gymnasium, Wuhan; Attendance: 1,084; Referees: Janita Richter (GER), Jang Jong Hyang (PRK)

October 17, 2019; 13:30 UTC+8	Canada	3–2	United States	Jianghan University Gymnasium, Wuhan; Attendance: 850; Referees: Jang Jong Hyang (PRK), Wang Haojuan (CHN)
October 17, 2019; 13:30 UTC+8	(25–23, 20–25, 25–18, 19–25, 21–19)			Jianghan University Gymnasium, Wuhan; Attendance: 850; Referees: Jang Jong Hyang (PRK), Wang Haojuan (CHN)

October 17, 2019; 19:30 UTC+8	China	3–0	Brazil	Jianghan University Gymnasium, Wuhan; Attendance: 1,550; Referees: Ralph Barnstorf (GER), William Thornburgh (USA)
October 17, 2019; 19:30 UTC+8	(25–17, 25–16, 25–21)			Jianghan University Gymnasium, Wuhan; Attendance: 1,550; Referees: Ralph Barnstorf (GER), William Thornburgh (USA)

October 20, 2019; 10:00 UTC+8	Brazil	3–0	United States	Wuhan Sports Center Gymnasium, Wuhan; Attendance: 4,500; Referees: Wang Haojuan (CHN), Jang Jong Hyang (PRK)
October 20, 2019; 10:00 UTC+8	(25–6, 25–14, 25–10)			Wuhan Sports Center Gymnasium, Wuhan; Attendance: 4,500; Referees: Wang Haojuan (CHN), Jang Jong Hyang (PRK)

October 20, 2019; 19:30 UTC+8	Canada	0–3	China	Wuhan Sports Center Gymnasium, Wuhan; Attendance: 11,000; Referees: William Thornburgh (USA), Gerard Broekema (NED)
October 20, 2019; 19:30 UTC+8	(11–25, 5–25, 19–25)			Wuhan Sports Center Gymnasium, Wuhan; Attendance: 11,000; Referees: William Thornburgh (USA), Gerard Broekema (NED)

=== Group B ===
Pos	Team	Pld	W	L	Pts	SW	SL	SR	SPW	SPL	SPR	Qualification
1	North Korea	3	3	0	9	9	0	MAX	225	93	2.419	Semi-finals
2	Germany	3	2	1	6	6	3	2.000	182	189	0.963	Semi-finals
3	France	3	1	2	2	3	8	0.375	189	251	0.753	
4	Netherlands	3	0	3	1	2	9	0.222	187	250	0.748	

Updated to match(es) played on 20 October 2019. Source: CISM

October 16, 2019; 13:30 UTC+8	Netherlands	2–3	France	Jianghan University Gymnasium, Wuhan; Attendance: 1,100; Referees: William Thornburgh (USA), Gou Ming (CHN)
October 16, 2019; 13:30 UTC+8	(19–25, 25–16, 25–17, 21–25, 11–15)			Jianghan University Gymnasium, Wuhan; Attendance: 1,100; Referees: William Thornburgh (USA), Gou Ming (CHN)

October 16, 2019; 16:40 UTC+8	Germany	0–3	North Korea	Jianghan University Gymnasium, Wuhan; Attendance: 1,000; Referees: Felipe Turchiari (BRA), Gerard Broekema (NED)
October 16, 2019; 16:40 UTC+8	(8–25, 9–25, 13–25)			Jianghan University Gymnasium, Wuhan; Attendance: 1,000; Referees: Felipe Turchiari (BRA), Gerard Broekema (NED)

October 17, 2019; 10:00 UTC+8	North Korea	3–0	France	Jianghan University Gymnasium, Wuhan; Attendance: 835; Referees: Gou Ming (CHN), Hermanus Rikken (NED)
October 17, 2019; 10:00 UTC+8	(25–9, 25–10, 25–14)			Jianghan University Gymnasium, Wuhan; Attendance: 835; Referees: Gou Ming (CHN), Hermanus Rikken (NED)

October 17, 2019; 16:50 UTC+8	Netherlands	0–3	Germany	Jianghan University Gymnasium, Wuhan; Attendance: 1,000; Referees: Samara Alexandra Sevor (CAN), Edir Cruz (BRA)
October 17, 2019; 16:50 UTC+8	(18–25, 13–25, 25–27)			Jianghan University Gymnasium, Wuhan; Attendance: 1,000; Referees: Samara Alexandra Sevor (CAN), Edir Cruz (BRA)

October 20, 2019; 13:30 UTC+8	Germany	3–0	France	Wuhan Sports Center Gymnasium, Wuhan; Attendance: 6,000; Referees: Zhang Tao (CHN), Samara Alexandra Sevor (CAN)
October 20, 2019; 13:30 UTC+8	(25–17, 25–19, 25–22)			Wuhan Sports Center Gymnasium, Wuhan; Attendance: 6,000; Referees: Zhang Tao (CHN), Samara Alexandra Sevor (CAN)

October 20, 2019; 15:35 UTC+8	North Korea	3–0	Netherlands	Wuhan Sports Center Gymnasium, Wuhan; Attendance: 4,500; Referees: Janita Richter (GER), Edir Cruz (BRA)
October 20, 2019; 15:35 UTC+8	(25–4, 25–13, 25–13)			Wuhan Sports Center Gymnasium, Wuhan; Attendance: 4,500; Referees: Janita Richter (GER), Edir Cruz (BRA)

== Classification round ==
=== 5th-8th place ===
October 21, 2019; 10:00 UTC+8	Canada	3–1	Netherlands	Wuhan Sports Center Gymnasium, Wuhan; Attendance: 3,500; Referees: Gou Ming (CHN), Jang Jong Hyang (PRK)
October 21, 2019; 10:00 UTC+8	(21–25, 25–13, 25–20, 25–16)			Wuhan Sports Center Gymnasium, Wuhan; Attendance: 3,500; Referees: Gou Ming (CHN), Jang Jong Hyang (PRK)

October 21, 2019; 13:30 UTC+8	France	1–3	United States	Wuhan Sports Center Gymnasium, Wuhan; Attendance: 4,500; Referees: Wang Ziling (CHN), Edir Cruz (BRA)
October 21, 2019; 13:30 UTC+8	(25–21, 17–25, 15–25, 23–25)			Wuhan Sports Center Gymnasium, Wuhan; Attendance: 4,500; Referees: Wang Ziling (CHN), Edir Cruz (BRA)

=== 7th-8th place ===
October 22, 2019; 10:00 UTC+8	Netherlands	2–3	France	Wuhan Sports Center Gymnasium, Wuhan; Attendance: 6,500; Referees: Ralph Barnstorf (GER), Zhang Tao (CHN)
October 22, 2019; 10:00 UTC+8	(25–23, 25–21, 24–26, 21–25, 12–15)			Wuhan Sports Center Gymnasium, Wuhan; Attendance: 6,500; Referees: Ralph Barnstorf (GER), Zhang Tao (CHN)

=== 5th-6th place ===
October 22, 2019; 13:30 UTC+8	Canada	2–3	United States	Wuhan Sports Center Gymnasium, Wuhan; Attendance: 6,500; Referees: Jang Jong Hyang (PRK), Edir Cruz (BRA)
October 22, 2019; 13:30 UTC+8	(25–22, 26–24, 16–25, 22–25, 10–15)			Wuhan Sports Center Gymnasium, Wuhan; Attendance: 6,500; Referees: Jang Jong Hyang (PRK), Edir Cruz (BRA)

== Final round ==
=== Semi-finals ===
October 21, 2019; 16:05 UTC+8	North Korea	1–3	Brazil	Wuhan Sports Center Gymnasium, Wuhan; Attendance: 3,500; Referees: Samara Alexandra Sevor (CAN), Janita Richter (GER)
October 21, 2019; 16:05 UTC+8	(25–19, 14–25, 23–25, 16–25)			Wuhan Sports Center Gymnasium, Wuhan; Attendance: 3,500; Referees: Samara Alexandra Sevor (CAN), Janita Richter (GER)

October 21, 2019; 19:30 UTC+8	China	3–0	Germany	Wuhan Sports Center Gymnasium, Wuhan; Attendance: 9,000; Referees: Christophe Fourel (FRA), Jang Jong Hyang (PRK)
October 21, 2019; 19:30 UTC+8	(25–12, 25–8, 25–9)			Wuhan Sports Center Gymnasium, Wuhan; Attendance: 9,000; Referees: Christophe Fourel (FRA), Jang Jong Hyang (PRK)

=== Bronze-medal match ===
October 22, 2019; 16:30 UTC+8	North Korea	3–0	Germany	Wuhan Sports Center Gymnasium, Wuhan; Attendance: 7,000; Referees: Wang Haojuan (CHN), Gerard Broekema (NED)
October 22, 2019; 16:30 UTC+8	(25–17, 25–12, 25–9)			Wuhan Sports Center Gymnasium, Wuhan; Attendance: 7,000; Referees: Wang Haojuan (CHN), Gerard Broekema (NED)

=== Gold-medal match ===
October 22, 2019; 19:30 UTC+8	Brazil	3–1	China	Wuhan Sports Center Gymnasium, Wuhan; Attendance: 12,000; Referees: Janita Richter (GER), Samara Alexandra Sevor (CAN)
October 22, 2019; 19:30 UTC+8	(25–23, 23–25, 25–23, 25–19)			Wuhan Sports Center Gymnasium, Wuhan; Attendance: 12,000; Referees: Janita Richter (GER), Samara Alexandra Sevor (CAN)

== Final standing ==
Rank	Team
1st place, gold medalist(s)	Brazil
2nd place, silver medalist(s)	China
3rd place, bronze medalist(s)	North Korea
4	Germany
5	United States
6	Canada
7	France
8	Netherlands
