= Pierre Le Corre =

French triathlete

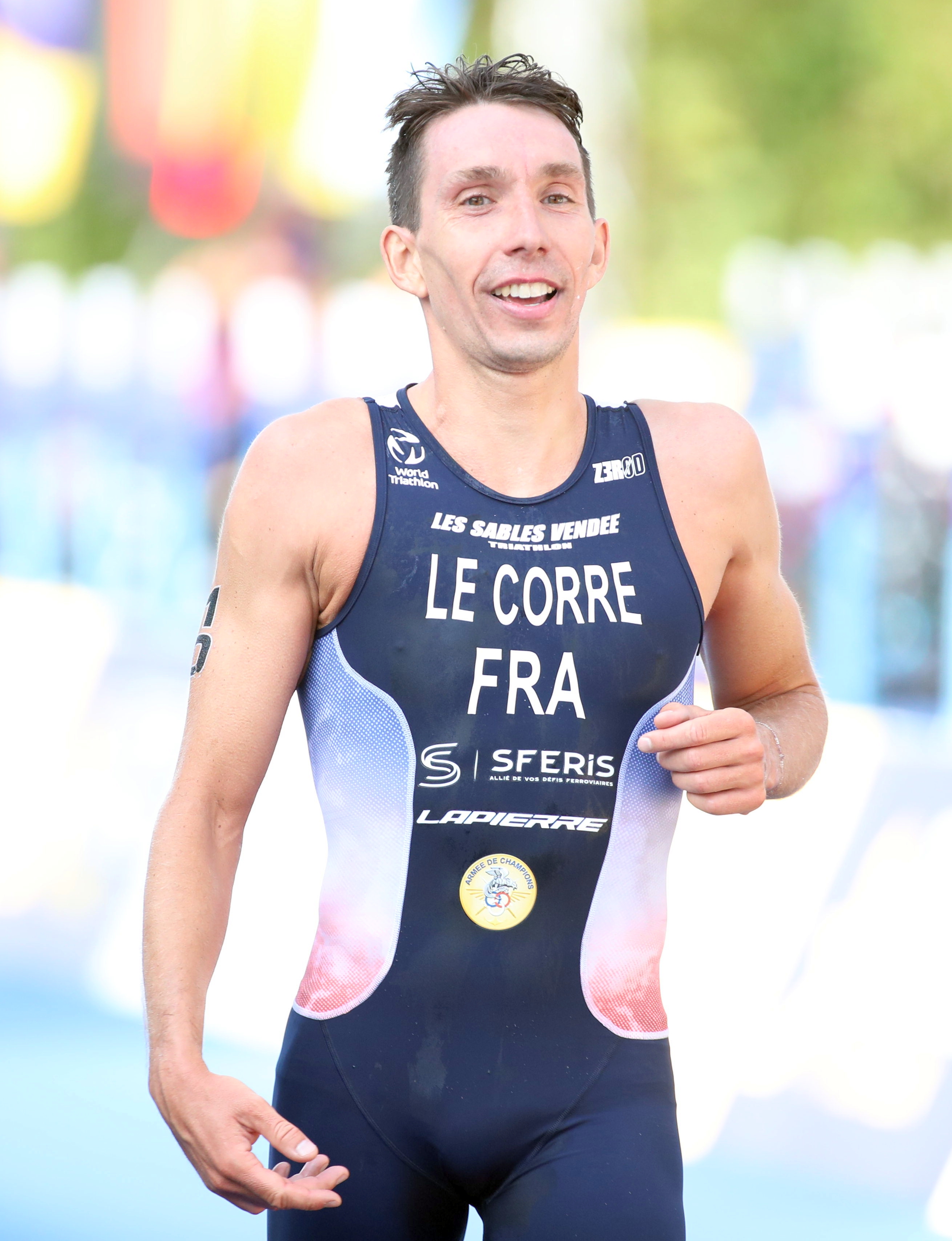

Personal information
- Born: 3 February 1990 (age 36)

Sport
- Sport: Triathlon
Medal record
Men's triathlon
Representing France
World Triathlon Long Distance Championships
Gold medal – first place	2022 Šamorín	Individual
Europe Triathlon Championships
Gold medal – first place	2018 Glasgow	Individual
Silver medal – second place	2022 Munich	Individual
Military World Games
Gold medal – first place	2019 Wuhan	Individual
Silver medal – second place	2019 Wuhan	Team

Pierre Le Corre (French pronunciation: [pjɛʁ lə kɔʁ]; born 3 February 1990) is a French triathlete. He competed in the men's event at the 2016 Summer Olympics and is the winner of 2022 World Triathlon Long Distance Championships.

In 2019, he won the gold medal in the men's triathlon at the 2019 Military World Games held in Wuhan, China.

He finished fourth in the men's triathlon at the 2024 Summer Olympics.
