= Algeria at the 2019 Military World Games =

- Flag of Algeria
- IOC code: ALG

in Wuhan, China 18 October 2019 – 27 October 2019
- Medals Ranked 37th: Gold 0 Silver 2 Bronze 5 Total 7

Military World Games appearances
- 1995; 1999; 2003; 2007; 2011; 2015; 2019; 2023

Algeria competed at the 2019 Military World Games held in Wuhan, China from 18 to 27 October 2019. In total, athletes representing Algeria won two silver and five bronze medals and the country finished in 37th place in the medal table.

== Medal summary ==
=== Medal by sports ===
Medals by sport
Sport	1st place, gold medalist(s)	2nd place, silver medalist(s)	3rd place, bronze medalist(s)	Total
Athletics	0	2	3	5
Boxing	0	0	1	1
Football	0	0	1	1

=== Medalists ===
Medal	Name	Sport	Event
Silver	Abdelmalik Lahoulou	Athletics	Men's 400 metres hurdles
Silver	Bilal Tabti	Athletics	Men's 3000 metres steeplechase
Bronze	Slimane Moula; Yassine Hethat; Mohamed Belbachir; Abdelmalik Lahoulou	Athletics	Men's 4 × 400 metres relay
Bronze	Yasser Triki	Athletics	Men's long jump
Bronze	Yasser Triki	Athletics	Men's triple jump
Bronze	Yahia Abdelli	Boxing	Men's -64 kg
Bronze	Men's team	Football	Men's tournament
