= Bahrain at the 2019 Military World Games =

- IOC code: BRN
- NOC: Bahrain Olympic Committee

in Wuhan, China 18 October - 27 October
- Competitors: 87 in 10 sports
- Medals Ranked 8th: Gold 9 Silver 1 Bronze 7 Total 17

Military World Games appearances
- 1995; 1999; 2003; 2007; 2011; 2015; 2019; 2023

Bahrain competed at the 2019 Military World Games in Wuhan from 18 to 27 October 2019. It sent a delegation consisting of 87 athletes competing in ten sports for the event.

== Participants ==
Sport	Men	Women	Total
Archery	1	1	2
Parachuting	5	0	5
Military pentathlon	2	0	2
Cycling	6	0	6
Judo	7	3	10
Golf	6	0	6
Football	21	0	21
Track and field	16	13	29
Equestrian	3	0	3
Shooting	2	1	3

== Medal summary ==
=== Medal by sports ===
Medals by sport
Sport	1st place, gold medalist(s)	2nd place, silver medalist(s)	3rd place, bronze medalist(s)	Total
Athletics	8	1	6	15
Football	1	0	0	1
Judo	0	0	1	1
