= Dorian Coninx =

French triathlete (born 1994)

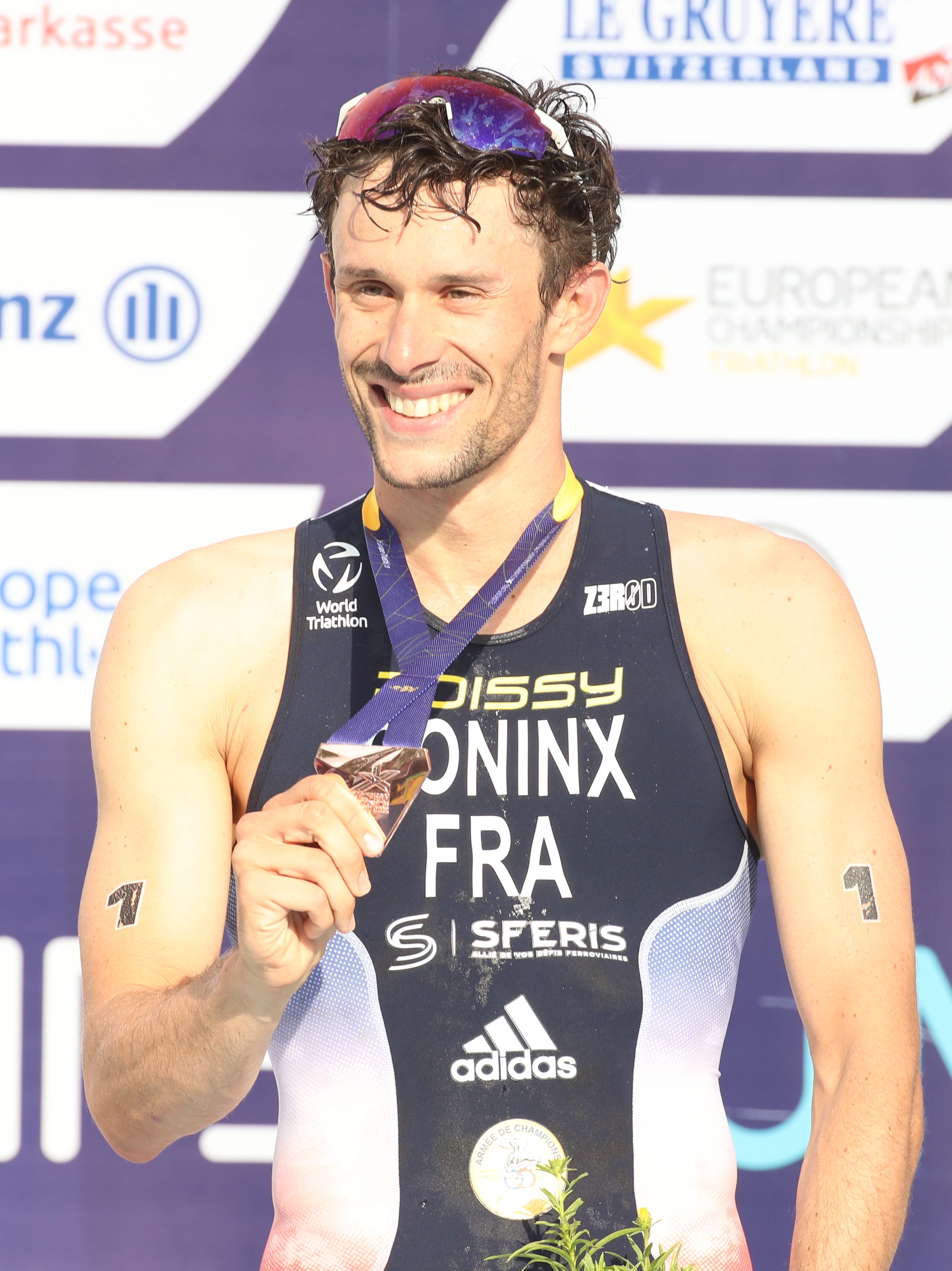
- Coninx at the 2022 European Triathlon Championships

Personal information
- Born: 28 January 1994 (age 32) Échirolles, Isère, France
- Height: 1.81 m (5 ft 11 in)
- Weight: 70 kg (154 lb)

Sport
- Country: France
- Sport: Triathlon
Medal record
Men's triathlon
Representing France
Olympic Games
Bronze medal – third place	2020 Tokyo	Mixed relay
World Triathlon Series
Gold medal – first place	2023 season	Men
Europe Triathlon Championships
Gold medal – first place	2021 Valencia	Individual
Gold medal – first place	2022 Munich	Mixed relay
Bronze medal – third place	2022 Munich	Individual
Military World Games
Silver medal – second place	2019 Wuhan	Team
Bronze medal – third place	2019 Wuhan	Individual
Super League Triathlon
Silver medal – second place	2022 Toulouse	Triple Mix

Dorian Coninx (born 28 January 1994) is a French triathlete. He competed in the men's event at the 2016 Summer Olympics.

== Triathlon career ==
Coninx won both the Junior European and Junior World Championship in 2013. He then won the U23 World title in 2014.

In winter 2015, he ran a 29' 39" 10k at the Cannes 10k, and went on to win his first international Elite race at the Quarteira European Cup event later in the year.

Coninx qualified for the 2016 Summer Olympics in Rio de Janeiro, Brazil. Representing France, he finished 36th with a time of 1h 51' 50".

In 2017, he became the French Elite Champion on sprint distance. Two years later, he won a bronze medal in the men's triathlon at the 2019 Military World Games held in Wuhan, China.

Coninx has also competed at Super League Triathlon events. He finished in second place at the 2022 Toulouse Cup. It was the first "Supertri" event held in France.
