= Volleyball at the 2019 Military World Games – Men's tournament =

Men's Volleyball at the 2019 Military World Games
- Venue: Jianghan University Gymnasium
- Date: 20 – 26 October
- Competitors: 120 from 10 nations

Medalists
| gold medal | China |
| silver medal | South Korea |
| bronze medal | Pakistan |

The Men's Volleyball tournament at the 2019 Military World Games is held in Wuhan, China from 20 to 26 October.

== Preliminary round ==
=== Group A ===
| Pos | Team | Pld | W | L | Pts | SW | SL | SR | SPW | SPL | SPR | Qualification |
|---|---|---|---|---|---|---|---|---|---|---|---|---|
| 1 | China | 4 | 3 | 1 | 9 | 9 | 3 | 3.000 | 293 | 230 | 1.274 | Semi-finals |
| 2 | Qatar | 4 | 3 | 1 | 9 | 9 | 3 | 3.000 | 279 | 272 | 1.026 | Semi-finals |
| 3 | Brazil | 4 | 3 | 1 | 9 | 9 | 4 | 2.250 | 304 | 254 | 1.197 | |
| 4 | France | 4 | 1 | 3 | 3 | 3 | 10 | 0.300 | 254 | 316 | 0.804 | |
| 5 | Venezuela | 4 | 0 | 4 | 0 | 2 | 12 | 0.167 | 288 | 346 | 0.832 | |

Updated to match(es) played on 24 October 2019. Source: CISM

| October 20, 2019; 10:00 UTC+8 | Qatar | 3–0 | Venezuela | Jianghan University Gymnasium, Wuhan; Attendance: 385; Referees: Wang Jun (CHN), Haji Kazemi Aliasghar (IRI) |
| October 20, 2019; 10:00 UTC+8 | (27–25, 25–22, 25–21) | | | Jianghan University Gymnasium, Wuhan; Attendance: 385; Referees: Wang Jun (CHN), Haji Kazemi Aliasghar (IRI) |

| October 20, 2019; 19:30 UTC+8 | China | 3–0 | France | Jianghan University Gymnasium, Wuhan; Attendance: 1,125; Referees: Felipe Turchiari (BRA), Lee Jae Sun (KOR) |
| October 20, 2019; 19:30 UTC+8 | (25–17, 25–16, 25–16) | | | Jianghan University Gymnasium, Wuhan; Attendance: 1,125; Referees: Felipe Turchiari (BRA), Lee Jae Sun (KOR) |

| October 21, 2019; 10:00 UTC+8 | Brazil | 3–0 | Qatar | Jianghan University Gymnasium, Wuhan; Attendance: 450; Referees: Liu Jiang (CHN), Hermanus Rikken (NED) |
| October 21, 2019; 10:00 UTC+8 | (25–12, 25–20, 25–20) | | | Jianghan University Gymnasium, Wuhan; Attendance: 450; Referees: Liu Jiang (CHN), Hermanus Rikken (NED) |

| October 21, 2019; 19:30 UTC+8 | Venezuela | 0–3 | China | Jianghan University Gymnasium, Wuhan; Attendance: 985; Referees: William Thornburgh (USA), Steven Georgestuart (CAN) |
| October 21, 2019; 19:30 UTC+8 | (16–25, 13–25, 21–25) | | | Jianghan University Gymnasium, Wuhan; Attendance: 985; Referees: William Thornburgh (USA), Steven Georgestuart (CAN) |

| October 22, 2019; 13:30 UTC+8 | France | 3–1 | Venezuela | Jianghan University Gymnasium, Wuhan; Attendance: 1,100; Referees: Liu Jiang (CHN), Hermanus Rikken (NED) |
| October 22, 2019; 13:30 UTC+8 | (25–20, 20–25, 25–22, 26–24) | | | Jianghan University Gymnasium, Wuhan; Attendance: 1,100; Referees: Liu Jiang (CHN), Hermanus Rikken (NED) |

| October 22, 2019; 19:30 UTC+8 | China | 3–0 | Brazil | Jianghan University Gymnasium, Wuhan; Attendance: 1,650; Referees: William Thornburgh (USA), Lee Jae Sun (KOR) |
| October 22, 2019; 19:30 UTC+8 | (27–25, 25–16, 25–15) | | | Jianghan University Gymnasium, Wuhan; Attendance: 1,650; Referees: William Thornburgh (USA), Lee Jae Sun (KOR) |

| October 23, 2019; 13:30 UTC+8 | Venezuela | 1–3 | Brazil | Jianghan University Gymnasium, Wuhan; Attendance: 950; Referees: Wang Hong (CHN), Ralph Barnstorf (GER) |
| October 23, 2019; 13:30 UTC+8 | (16–25, 19–25, 25–23, 19–25) | | | Jianghan University Gymnasium, Wuhan; Attendance: 950; Referees: Wang Hong (CHN), Ralph Barnstorf (GER) |

| October 23, 2019; 16:00 UTC+8 | France | 0–3 | Qatar | Jianghan University Gymnasium, Wuhan; Attendance: 1,050; Referees: Wang Jun (CHN), Samara Alexandra Sevor (CAN) |
| October 23, 2019; 16:00 UTC+8 | (22–25, 19–25, 22–25) | | | Jianghan University Gymnasium, Wuhan; Attendance: 1,050; Referees: Wang Jun (CHN), Samara Alexandra Sevor (CAN) |

| October 24, 2019; 10:00 UTC+8 | Brazil | 3–0 | France | Jianghan University Gymnasium, Wuhan; Attendance: 800; Referees: Samara Alexandra Sevor (CAN), Fan Gaoxiang (CHN) |
| October 24, 2019; 10:00 UTC+8 | (25–16, 25–13, 25–17) | | | Jianghan University Gymnasium, Wuhan; Attendance: 800; Referees: Samara Alexandra Sevor (CAN), Fan Gaoxiang (CHN) |

| October 24, 2019; 19:30 UTC+8 | Qatar | 3–0 | China | Jianghan University Gymnasium, Wuhan; Attendance: 1,500; Referees: William Thornburgh (USA), Steven Georgestuart (CAN) |
| October 24, 2019; 19:30 UTC+8 | (25–22, 25–22, 25–22) | | | Jianghan University Gymnasium, Wuhan; Attendance: 1,500; Referees: William Thornburgh (USA), Steven Georgestuart (CAN) |

=== Group B ===
| Pos | Team | Pld | W | L | Pts | SW | SL | SR | SPW | SPL | SPR | Qualification |
|---|---|---|---|---|---|---|---|---|---|---|---|---|
| 1 | South Korea | 4 | 4 | 0 | 11 | 12 | 3 | 4.000 | 355 | 275 | 1.291 | Semi-finals |
| 2 | Pakistan | 4 | 3 | 1 | 10 | 11 | 4 | 2.750 | 350 | 292 | 1.199 | Semi-finals |
| 3 | Iran | 4 | 2 | 2 | 6 | 8 | 7 | 1.143 | 351 | 299 | 1.174 | |
| 4 | Netherlands | 4 | 1 | 3 | 3 | 3 | 10 | 0.300 | 211 | 315 | 0.670 | |
| 5 | Canada | 4 | 0 | 4 | 0 | 2 | 12 | 0.167 | 261 | 347 | 0.752 | |

Updated to match(es) played on 24 October 2019. Source: CISM

| October 20, 2019; 13:30 UTC+8 | Iran | 1–3 | South Korea | Jianghan University Gymnasium, Wuhan; Attendance: 950; Referees: Liu Jiang (CHN), Ralph Barnstorf (GER) |
| October 20, 2019; 13:30 UTC+8 | (18–25, 26–24, 18–25, 24–26) | | | Jianghan University Gymnasium, Wuhan; Attendance: 950; Referees: Liu Jiang (CHN), Ralph Barnstorf (GER) |

| October 20, 2019; 16:15 UTC+8 | Pakistan | 3–0 | Netherlands | Jianghan University Gymnasium, Wuhan; Attendance: 600; Referees: Wang Hong (CHN), Steven Georgestuart (CAN) |
| October 20, 2019; 16:15 UTC+8 | (25–17, 25–11, 25–15) | | | Jianghan University Gymnasium, Wuhan; Attendance: 600; Referees: Wang Hong (CHN), Steven Georgestuart (CAN) |

| October 21, 2019; 13:30 UTC+8 | South Korea | 3–2 | Pakistan | Jianghan University Gymnasium, Wuhan; Attendance: 725; Referees: Haji Kazemi Aliasghar (IRI), Wang Hong (CHN) |
| October 21, 2019; 13:30 UTC+8 | (19–25, 21–25, 25–17, 25–21, 15–12) | | | Jianghan University Gymnasium, Wuhan; Attendance: 725; Referees: Haji Kazemi Aliasghar (IRI), Wang Hong (CHN) |

| October 21, 2019; 16:25 UTC+8 | Canada | 1–3 | Iran | Jianghan University Gymnasium, Wuhan; Attendance: 675; Referees: Ralph Barnstorf (GER), Felipe Turchiari (BRA) |
| October 21, 2019; 16:25 UTC+8 | (25–23, 18–25, 10–25, 14–25) | | | Jianghan University Gymnasium, Wuhan; Attendance: 675; Referees: Ralph Barnstorf (GER), Felipe Turchiari (BRA) |

| October 22, 2019; 10:00 UTC+8 | Pakistan | 3–0 | Canada | Jianghan University Gymnasium, Wuhan; Attendance: 400; Referees: Fan Gaoxiang (CHN), Haji Kazemi Aliasghar (IRI) |
| October 22, 2019; 10:00 UTC+8 | (25–16, 25–16, 25–20) | | | Jianghan University Gymnasium, Wuhan; Attendance: 400; Referees: Fan Gaoxiang (CHN), Haji Kazemi Aliasghar (IRI) |

| October 22, 2019; 16:00 UTC+8 | Netherlands | 0–3 | South Korea | Jianghan University Gymnasium, Wuhan; Attendance: 750; Referees: Felipe Turchiari (BRA), Christophe Fourel (FRA) |
| October 22, 2019; 16:00 UTC+8 | (16–25, 9–25, 12–25) | | | Jianghan University Gymnasium, Wuhan; Attendance: 750; Referees: Felipe Turchiari (BRA), Christophe Fourel (FRA) |

| October 23, 2019; 10:00 UTC+8 | Netherlands | 0–3 | Iran | Jianghan University Gymnasium, Wuhan; Attendance: 300; Referees: William Thornburgh (USA), Fan Gaoxiang (CHN) |
| October 23, 2019; 10:00 UTC+8 | (5–25, 12–25, 15–25) | | | Jianghan University Gymnasium, Wuhan; Attendance: 300; Referees: William Thornburgh (USA), Fan Gaoxiang (CHN) |

| October 23, 2019; 19:30 UTC+8 | South Korea | 3–0 | Canada | Jianghan University Gymnasium, Wuhan; Attendance: 1,275; Referees: Felipe Turchiari (BRA), Janita Richter (GER) |
| October 23, 2019; 19:30 UTC+8 | (25–16, 25–17, 25–19) | | | Jianghan University Gymnasium, Wuhan; Attendance: 1,275; Referees: Felipe Turchiari (BRA), Janita Richter (GER) |

| October 24, 2019; 13:30 UTC+8 | Canada | 1–3 | Netherlands | Jianghan University Gymnasium, Wuhan; Attendance: 1,250; Referees: Ralph Barnstorf (GER), Wang Jun (CHN) |
| October 24, 2019; 13:30 UTC+8 | (26–24, 23–25, 21–25, 20–25) | | | Jianghan University Gymnasium, Wuhan; Attendance: 1,250; Referees: Ralph Barnstorf (GER), Wang Jun (CHN) |

| October 24, 2019; 16:00 UTC+8 | Iran | 1–3 | Pakistan | Jianghan University Gymnasium, Wuhan; Attendance: 800; Referees: Liu Jiang (CHN), Felipe Turchiari (BRA) |
| October 24, 2019; 16:00 UTC+8 | (27–25, 20–25, 23–25, 22–25) | | | Jianghan University Gymnasium, Wuhan; Attendance: 800; Referees: Liu Jiang (CHN), Felipe Turchiari (BRA) |

== Classification round ==
=== 9th-10th place ===
| October 25, 2019; 10:00 UTC+8 | Venezuela | 3–2 | Canada | Jianghan University Gymnasium, Wuhan; Attendance: 600; Referees: Fan Gaoxiang (CHN), Hermanus Rikken (NED) |
| October 25, 2019; 10:00 UTC+8 | (21–25, 30–28, 23–25, 26–24, 15–9) | | | Jianghan University Gymnasium, Wuhan; Attendance: 600; Referees: Fan Gaoxiang (CHN), Hermanus Rikken (NED) |

=== 5th-8th place ===
| October 25, 2019; 13:00 UTC+8 | Brazil | 3–0 | Netherlands | Jianghan University Gymnasium, Wuhan; Attendance: 400; Referees: Samara Alexandra Sevor (CAN), Wang Hong (CHN) |
| October 25, 2019; 13:00 UTC+8 | (25–12, 25–14, 25–11) | | | Jianghan University Gymnasium, Wuhan; Attendance: 400; Referees: Samara Alexandra Sevor (CAN), Wang Hong (CHN) |

| October 25, 2019; 14:40 UTC+8 | Iran | 3–0 | France | Jianghan University Gymnasium, Wuhan; Attendance: 700; Referees: Liu Jiang (CHN), Lee Jae Sun (KOR) |
| October 25, 2019; 14:40 UTC+8 | (25–15, 25–18, 25–18) | | | Jianghan University Gymnasium, Wuhan; Attendance: 700; Referees: Liu Jiang (CHN), Lee Jae Sun (KOR) |

=== 7th-8th place ===
| October 26, 2019; 10:00 UTC+8 | Netherlands | 2–3 | France | Jianghan University Gymnasium, Wuhan; Attendance: 500; Referees: Janita Richter (GER), Fan Gaoxiang (CHN) |
| October 26, 2019; 10:00 UTC+8 | (15–25, 25–22, 25–21, 16–25, 5–15) | | | Jianghan University Gymnasium, Wuhan; Attendance: 500; Referees: Janita Richter (GER), Fan Gaoxiang (CHN) |

=== 5th-6th place ===
| October 26, 2019; 13:30 UTC+8 | Brazil | 0–3 | Iran | Jianghan University Gymnasium, Wuhan; Attendance: 1,000; Referees: Wang Jun (CHN), Hermanus Rikken (NED) |
| October 26, 2019; 13:30 UTC+8 | (20–25, 18–25, 23–25) | | | Jianghan University Gymnasium, Wuhan; Attendance: 1,000; Referees: Wang Jun (CHN), Hermanus Rikken (NED) |

== Final round ==
=== Semi-finals ===
| October 25, 2019; 16:30 UTC+8 | South Korea | 3–1 | Qatar | Jianghan University Gymnasium, Wuhan; Attendance: 350; Referees: William Thornburgh (USA), Janita Richter (GER) |
| October 25, 2019; 16:30 UTC+8 | (25–18, 25–21, 14–25, 25–18) | | | Jianghan University Gymnasium, Wuhan; Attendance: 350; Referees: William Thornburgh (USA), Janita Richter (GER) |

| October 25, 2019; 19:30 UTC+8 | China | 3–0 | Pakistan | Jianghan University Gymnasium, Wuhan; Attendance: 3,000; Referees: Ralph Barnstorf (GER), Samara Alexandra Sevor (CAN) |
| October 25, 2019; 19:30 UTC+8 | (27–25, 25–15, 25–19) | | | Jianghan University Gymnasium, Wuhan; Attendance: 3,000; Referees: Ralph Barnstorf (GER), Samara Alexandra Sevor (CAN) |

=== Bronze-medal match ===
| October 26, 2019; 15:45 UTC+8 | Qatar | 0–3 | Pakistan | Jianghan University Gymnasium, Wuhan; Attendance: 950; Referees: Liu Jiang (CHN), Samara Alexandra Sevor (CAN) |
| October 26, 2019; 15:45 UTC+8 | (20–25, 21–25, 16–25) | | | Jianghan University Gymnasium, Wuhan; Attendance: 950; Referees: Liu Jiang (CHN), Samara Alexandra Sevor (CAN) |

=== Gold-medal match ===
| October 26, 2019; 19:30 UTC+8 | South Korea | 1–3 | China | Jianghan University Gymnasium, Wuhan; Attendance: 1,550; Referees: William Thornburgh (USA), Ralph Barnstorf (GER) |
| October 26, 2019; 19:30 UTC+8 | (23–25, 19–25, 25–19, 21–25) | | | Jianghan University Gymnasium, Wuhan; Attendance: 1,550; Referees: William Thornburgh (USA), Ralph Barnstorf (GER) |

== Final standing ==
| Rank | Team |
|---|---|
| 1st place, gold medalist(s) | China |
| 2nd place, silver medalist(s) | South Korea |
| 3rd place, bronze medalist(s) | Pakistan |
| 4 | Qatar |
| 5 | Iran |
| 6 | Brazil |
| 7 | France |
| 8 | Netherlands |
| 9 | Venezuela |
| 10 | Canada |
