= Qatar at the 2019 Military World Games =

- Flag of Qatar
- IOC code: QAT

in Wuhan, China 18 October 2019 – 27 October 2019
- Medals Ranked 41st: Gold 0 Silver 2 Bronze 0 Total 2

Military World Games appearances
- 1995; 1999; 2003; 2007; 2011; 2015; 2019; 2023

Qatar competed at the 2019 Military World Games held in Wuhan, China from 18 to 27 October 2019. In total, athletes representing Qatar won two silver medals and the country finished in 41st place in the medal table.

== Medal summary ==
=== Medal by sports ===
Medals by sport
Sport	1st place, gold medalist(s)	2nd place, silver medalist(s)	3rd place, bronze medalist(s)	Total
Football	0	1	0	1
Parachuting	0	1	0	1

=== Medalists ===
Medal	Name	Sport	Event
Silver	Men's team	Football	Men's tournament
Silver	Men's team	Parachuting	Men's Formation Skydive
