= Basketball at the 2019 Military World Games – Women's tournament =

Women's Basketball at the 2019 Military World Games
- Venue: Huazhong University of Science and Technology Optics Valley Gymnasium
- Date: 19 – 26 October
- Competitors: 70 from 6 nations

Medalists
gold medal	China
silver medal	Brazil
bronze medal	United States

The Women's Basketball tournament at the 2019 Military World Games was held in Wuhan, China from 19 to 26 October.

== Preliminary round ==
Pos	Team	Pld	W	L	GF	GA	GD	Pts	Qualification
1	China	5	5	0	525	251	+274	10	Gold medal match
2	Brazil	5	4	1	363	252	+111	9	Gold medal match
3	United States	5	3	2	362	325	+37	8	Bronze medal match
4	France	5	2	3	321	337	−16	7	Bronze medal match
5	Germany	5	1	4	214	420	−206	6	
6	Canada	5	0	5	208	408	−200	5	

October 19, 2019
:

Brazil	87–33	Germany

Huazhong University of Science and Technology Optics Valley Gymnasium, Wuhan

October 19, 2019
:

France	65–67	United States

Huazhong University of Science and Technology Optics Valley Gymnasium, Wuhan

October 19, 2019
:

China	111–29	Canada

Huazhong University of Science and Technology Optics Valley Gymnasium, Wuhan

October 20, 2019
:

Canada	48–64	France

Huazhong University of Science and Technology Optics Valley Gymnasium, Wuhan

October 20, 2019
:

United States	56–68	Brazil

Huazhong University of Science and Technology Optics Valley Gymnasium, Wuhan

October 20, 2019
:

Germany	43–128	China

Huazhong University of Science and Technology Optics Valley Gymnasium, Wuhan

October 21, 2019
:

France	57–68	Brazil

Huazhong University of Science and Technology Optics Valley Gymnasium, Wuhan

October 21, 2019
:

Canada	50–53	Germany

Huazhong University of Science and Technology Optics Valley Gymnasium, Wuhan

October 21, 2019
:

China	119–71	United States

Huazhong University of Science and Technology Optics Valley Gymnasium, Wuhan

October 23, 2019
:

United States	81–34	Germany

Huazhong University of Science and Technology Optics Valley Gymnasium, Wuhan

October 23, 2019
:

Brazil	93–42	Canada

Huazhong University of Science and Technology Optics Valley Gymnasium, Wuhan

October 23, 2019
:

France	61–103	China

Huazhong University of Science and Technology Optics Valley Gymnasium, Wuhan

October 24, 2019
:

Canada	39–87	United States

Huazhong University of Science and Technology Optics Valley Gymnasium, Wuhan

October 24, 2019
:

Germany	51–74	France

Huazhong University of Science and Technology Optics Valley Gymnasium, Wuhan

October 24, 2019
:

China	64–47	Brazil

Huazhong University of Science and Technology Optics Valley Gymnasium, Wuhan

== Final Round ==
=== Bronze medal match ===
October 26, 2019
16:00

United States	85–79	France

Huazhong University of Science and Technology Optics Valley Gymnasium, Wuhan

=== Gold medal match ===
October 26, 2019
19:00

China	93–65	Brazil

Huazhong University of Science and Technology Optics Valley Gymnasium, Wuhan

China defeated Brazil, 93–65, in the gold-medal match.

== Final standing ==
Rank	Team
1st place, gold medalist(s)	China
2nd place, silver medalist(s)	Brazil
3rd place, bronze medalist(s)	United States
4	France
5	Germany
6	Canada
