= Syria at the 2019 Military World Games =

- IOC code: SYR

in Wuhan, China 18 October 2019 – 27 October 2019
- Medals Ranked 46th: Gold 0 Silver 1 Bronze 1 Total 2

Military World Games appearances
- 1995; 1999; 2003; 2007; 2011; 2015; 2019; 2023

Syria competed at the 2019 Military World Games held in Wuhan, China from 18 to 27 October 2019. In total, athletes representing Syria won one silver and one bronze medal and the country finished in 46th place in the medal table.

== Medal summary ==
=== Medal by sports ===
Medals by sport
| Sport | 1st place, gold medalist(s) | 2nd place, silver medalist(s) | 3rd place, bronze medalist(s) | Total |
|---|---|---|---|---|
| Athletics | 0 | 1 | 0 | 1 |
| Boxing | 0 | 0 | 1 | 1 |

=== Medalists ===
| Medal | Name | Sport | Event |
|---|---|---|---|
| Silver | Majd Eddin Ghazal | Athletics | Men's high jump |
| Bronze | Ahmad Ghousoon | Boxing | Men's -75 kg |
