= Football at the 2019 Military World Games – Men's tournament =

Men's Football Tournament at the 2019 Military World Games
Tournament details
- Host country: China
- Dates: 16 – 27 October
- Teams: 12 (from 5 confederations)
- Venues: 2 (in 1 host city)

Final positions
- Champions: Bahrain
- Runners-up: Qatar
- Third place: Algeria
- Fourth place: North Korea

The men's football tournament at the 2019 Military World Games was held in Wuhan from 16 to 27 October.

== Group stage ==
=== Group A ===
Pos	Team	Pld	W	D	L	GF	GA	GD	Pts	Qualification
1	Algeria	3	2	1	0	13	1	+12	7	Quarter-finals
2	Qatar	3	1	2	0	5	3	+2	5	Quarter-finals
3	Republic of Ireland	3	1	1	1	3	5	−2	4	Quarter-finals
4	United States	3	0	0	3	1	13	−12	0	

Source: Wuhan 2019
16 October 2019
11:00 UTC+8

Algeria	4–0	Republic of Ireland

Wuhan National Fitness Center Football Field 1, Wuhan
Referee: Khalid Abdullah Al-Shidi (Oman)
16 October 2019
11:00 UTC+8

Qatar	3–1	United States

Wuhan National Fitness Center Football Field 2, Wuhan
Referee: Karim Abed (France)
18 October 2019
11:00 UTC+8

Algeria	1–1	Qatar

Wuhan National Fitness Center Football Field 4, Wuhan
Referee: Aristotelis Diamantopoulos (Greece)
18 October 2019
11:00 UTC+8

United States	0–2	Republic of Ireland

Wuhan National Fitness Center Football Field 1, Wuhan
Referee: Jan Erik Wild (Germany)
20 October 2019
11:00 UTC+8

United States	0–8	Algeria

Wuhan National Fitness Center Football Field 3, Wuhan
Referee: Khalid Abdullah Al-Shidi (Oman)
20 October 2019
11:00 UTC+8

Republic of Ireland	1–1	Qatar

Wuhan National Fitness Center Football Field 2, Wuhan
Referee: ZhenLu Shi (China)

=== Group B ===
Pos	Team	Pld	W	D	L	GF	GA	GD	Pts	Qualification
1	Oman	3	3	0	0	10	2	+8	9	Quarter-finals
2	Egypt	3	1	1	1	3	1	+2	4	Quarter-finals
3	Greece	3	1	1	1	4	6	−2	4	Quarter-finals
4	Canada	3	0	0	3	1	9	−8	0	

Source: Wuhan 2019
16 October 2019
11:00 UTC+8

Greece	0–0	Egypt

Wuhan National Fitness Center Football Field 3, Wuhan
Referee: Leandro De Lima E Silva (Brazil)
16 October 2019
11:00 UTC+8

Canada	0–4	Oman

Wuhan National Fitness Center Football Field 4, Wuhan
Referee: Tobias Kossiski (Germany)
18 October 2019
11:00 UTC+8

Greece	2–1	Canada

Wuhan National Fitness Center Football Field 3, Wuhan
Referee: Lahlou Benbraham (Algeria)
18 October 2019
11:00 UTC+8

Oman	1–0	Egypt

Wuhan National Fitness Center Football Field 2, Wuhan
Referee: Karim Abed (France)
20 October 2019
11:00 UTC+8

Oman	5–2	Greece

Wuhan National Fitness Center Football Field 1, Wuhan
Referee: Karim Abed (France)
20 October 2019
11:00 UTC+8

Egypt	3–0	Canada

Wuhan National Fitness Center Football Field 4, Wuhan
Referee: Jan Erik Wild (Germany)

=== Group C ===
Pos	Team	Pld	W	D	L	GF	GA	GD	Pts	Qualification
1	North Korea	3	2	1	0	6	3	+3	7 (Note: Fair play points: North Korea −10, Bahrain −14.)	Quarter-finals
2	Bahrain	3	2	1	0	6	3	+3	7	Quarter-finals
3	Brazil	3	0	1	2	0	1	−1	1 (Note: Fair play points: Brazil −9, France −12.)	
4	France	3	0	1	2	0	1	−1	1	

Source: Wuhan 2019
Notes:
16 October 2019
15:00 UTC+8

France	0–1	North Korea

Wuhan National Fitness Center Football Field 2, Wuhan
Referee: Mohamed Adel Hussein (Egypt)
16 October 2019
15:00 UTC+8

Brazil	0–1	Bahrain

Wuhan National Fitness Center Football Field 3, Wuhan
Referee: Chunhan Gu (China)
18 October 2019
15:00 UTC+8

France	0–0	Brazil

Wuhan National Fitness Center Football Field 4, Wuhan
Referee: Eoghan O'Shea (Republic of Ireland)
18 October 2019
15:00 UTC+8

Bahrain	2–2	North Korea

Wuhan National Fitness Center Football Field 2, Wuhan
Referee: Chunhan Gu (China)
20 October 2019
15:00 UTC+8

Bahrain	3–1	France

Wuhan National Fitness Center Football Field 3, Wuhan
Referee: Lahlou Benbraham (Algeria)
20 October 2019
15:00 UTC+8

North Korea	3–1	Brazil

Wuhan National Fitness Center Football Field 2, Wuhan
Referee: Aristotelis Diamantopoulos (Greece)

== Knockout stage ==
=== Quarter-finals ===
23 October 2019
15:00 UTC+8

Algeria	3–0	Republic of Ireland

Wuhan National Fitness Center Football Field 1, Wuhan
Referee: Chunhan Gu (China)
23 October 2019
15:00 UTC+8

Oman	0–1	Bahrain

Wuhan National Fitness Center Football Field 2, Wuhan
Referee: Karim Abed (France)
23 October 2019
15:00 UTC+8

North Korea	1–0	Greece

Wuhan National Fitness Center Football Field 3, Wuhan
Referee: Mohamed Adel Hussein (Egypt)
23 October 2019
15:00 UTC+8

Qatar	1–0	Egypt

Wuhan National Fitness Center Football Field 4, Wuhan
Referee: Lahlou Benbraham (Algeria)

=== Semi-finals ===
25 October 2019
11:00 UTC+8

Algeria	1–1 (a.e.t.)	Bahrain
Penalties
	3–5

Hankou Cultural Sports Centre, Wuhan
Referee: Aristotelis Diamantopoulos (Greece)
25 October 2019
15:00 UTC+8

North Korea	1–2	Qatar

Hankou Cultural Sports Centre, Wuhan
Referee: Eoghan O'Shea (Republic of Ireland)

=== Bronze medal match ===
27 October 2019
11:00 UTC+8

Algeria	4–0	North Korea

Hankou Cultural Sports Centre, Wuhan
Referee: Mohamed Adel Hussein (Egypt)

=== Gold medal match ===
27 October 2019
15:00 UTC+8

Bahrain	3–1	Qatar

Hankou Cultural Sports Centre, Wuhan
Referee: Lahlou Benbraham (Algeria)
