= Morocco at the 2019 Military World Games =

- Flag of Morocco
- IOC code: MAR

in Wuhan, China 18 October 2019 – 27 October 2019
- Medals Ranked 20th: Gold 2 Silver 1 Bronze 2 Total 5

Military World Games appearances
- 1995; 1999; 2003; 2007; 2011; 2015; 2019; 2023

Morocco competed at the 2019 Military World Games held in Wuhan, China from 18 to 27 October 2019. In total, athletes representing Morocco won two gold medals, one silver medal and two bronze medals. The country finished in 20th place in the medal table.

== Medal summary ==
=== Medal by sports ===
Medals by sport
Sport	1st place, gold medalist(s)	2nd place, silver medalist(s)	3rd place, bronze medalist(s)	Total
Athletics	1	1	1	3
Taekwondo	0	0	1	1
Parachuting	1	0	0	1

=== Medalists ===
Medal	Name	Sport	Event
Gold	Mohamed Reda El Aaraby	Athletics	Men's 10,000 metres
Gold	Women's team	Parachuting	Women's Formation Skydive
Silver	Hicham Ouladha	Athletics	Men's 1500 metres
Bronze	Hamza Sahli	Athletics	Men's 10,000 metres
Bronze	Nour Eddine Ziani	Taekwondo	Men's 87 kg
