= Table tennis at the 2019 Military World Games =

Table tennis at the 2019 Military World Games was held in Wuhan, China from 19 to 26 October 2019.

== Medal summary ==
=== Medalists ===
Event	Gold	Silver	Bronze
Men's singles	(China) Fan Zhendong	(South Korea) Jeoung Young-sik	(China) Xu Chenhao
Men's doubles	(China) Fan Zhendong (China) Zhou Yu	(China) Zhou Kai (China) Xu Chenhao	(North Korea) Kim Hyong-jin (North Korea) Ham Yu-song
Men's team	China (CHN); Fan Zhendong; Zhou Yu; Zhou Kai; Xu Chenhao	North Korea (PRK); Kim Hyong-jin; Ham Yu-song; An Ji-song; Ro Hyon-song	South Korea (KOR); Kim Dong-hyun; Jeoung Young-sik; Cho Jae-jun; Jeong Yeong-hun
Women's singles	(China) Mu Zi	(North Korea) Kim Song-i	(China) Liu Xi
Women's doubles	(China) Chen Ke (China) Mu Zi	(China) Liu Xi (China) Sun Mingyang	(North Korea) Cha Hyo-sim (North Korea) Kim Nam-hae
Mixed doubles	(China) Fan Zhendong (China) Mu Zi	(China) Zhou Yu (China) Sun Mingyang	(North Korea) Ham Yu-song (North Korea) Cha Hyo-sim
