= Kenya at the 2019 Military World Games =

- Flag of Kenya
- IOC code: KEN

in Wuhan, China 18 October 2019 – 27 October 2019
- Medals Ranked 20th: Gold 2 Silver 1 Bronze 2 Total 5

Military World Games appearances
- 1995; 1999; 2003; 2007; 2011; 2015; 2019; 2023

Kenya competed at the 2019 Military World Games held in Wuhan, China from 18 to 27 October 2019. In total, athletes representing Kenya won two gold medals, one silver medal and two bronze medals; all medals were won in athletics. The country finished in 20th place in the medal table.

== Medal summary ==
=== Medal by sports ===
Medals by sport
Sport	1st place, gold medalist(s)	2nd place, silver medalist(s)	3rd place, bronze medalist(s)	Total
Athletics	2	1	2	5

=== Medalists ===
Medal	Name	Sport	Event
Gold	Benjamin Kigen	Athletics	Men's 3000 metres steeplechase
Gold	Winny Chebet	Athletics	Women's 1500 metres
Silver	Cornelius Tuwei	Athletics	Men's 800 metres
Bronze	Peter Njoroge Ndegwa	Athletics	Men's 5000 metres
Bronze	Irene Kimais	Athletics	Women's 5000 metres
