= Track and field at the 2019 Military World Games =

- Dates: 22–27 October
- Host city: Wuhan, China
- Venue: Wuhan Five Rings Sports Center
- Level: Senior military
- Events: 45 + 29 Para Athletics
- Records set: 8 games records

The track and field competition at the 2019 Military World Games was held from 22 to 27 October 2019 at the Wuhan Five Rings Sports Center in Wuhan, China. A total of 45 athletics events were contested, 24 by men and 21 by women. Women did not compete in pole vault, 50 kilometres race walk or the 10,000 metres. Marathon events were staged on the East Lake Greenway. For a second time running, para-athletics events were included in the schedule, with a total of 78 medal events available, 41 for men and 37 for women.

== Medal summary ==
=== Men ===
Event	Gold		Silver		Bronze	
100 metres	Hassan Taftian; Iran (IRI)	10.24	Paulo André de Oliveira; Brazil (BRA)	10.32	Amaury Golitin; France (FRA)	10.35
200 metres	Aldemir da Silva Júnior; Brazil (BRA)	20.31 GR	Serhiy Smelyk; Ukraine (UKR)	20.58	Yancarlos Martínez; Dominican Republic (DOM)	20.62
400 metres	Abbas Abubakar Abbas; Bahrain (BHR)	45.84	Mazen Al-Yasen; Saudi Arabia (KSA)	46.24	Musa Isah; Bahrain (BHR)	46.70
800 metres	Michał Rozmys; Poland (POL)	1:49.00	Cornelius Tuwei; Kenya (KEN)	1:49.20	Abraham Rotich; Bahrain (BHR)	1:49.36
1500 metres	Michał Rozmys; Poland (POL)	3:46.33	Hicham Ouladha; Morocco (MAR)	3:46.44	Marcin Lewandowski; Poland (POL)	3:46.61
5000 metres	Birhanu Balew; Bahrain (BHR)	14:08.99	Amanal Petros; Germany (GER)	14:09.16	Peter Njoroge Ndegwa; Kenya (KEN)	14:09.23
10,000 metres	Mohamed Reda El Aaraby; Morocco (MAR)	28:44.25	Amanal Petros; Germany (GER)	28:44.30	Hamza Sahli; Morocco (MAR)	28:56.68
110 metres hurdles	Sergey Shubenkov; Russia (RUS)	13.40	Zeng Jianhang; China (CHN)	13.53	Yaqoub Al-Youha; Kuwait (KUW)	13.60
400 metres hurdles	Mehdi Pirjahan; Iran (IRI)	49.61	Abdelmalik Lahoulou; Algeria (ALG)	49.68	Patryk Dobek; Poland (POL)	49.69
3000 metres steeplechase	Benjamin Kigen; Kenya (KEN)	8:24.50	Bilal Tabti; Algeria (ALG)	8:28.71	Yoann Kowal; France (FRA)	8:29.72
4 × 100 metres relay	Brazil (BRA); Rodrigo do Nascimento; Aldemir da Silva Júnior; Derick Silva; Paulo André de Oliveira	38.68 GR	Oman (OMN); Fatek Adnan Awadh Bait Qisan; Barakat Al-Harthi; Mohamed Obaid Al-Saadi; Abdulaziz Samir Al-Riyami	39.51	Dominican Republic (DOM); Christopher Valdez Guzman; Yohandris Andújar; Lidio Andres Feliz; Yancarlos Martínez	39.54
4 × 400 metres relay	Bahrain (BHR); Musa Isah; Saad Mubarak; Yaqoob Salem Eid; Abbas Abubakar Abbas	3ː06.20	Poland (POL); Łukasz Krawczuk; Jakub Krzewina; Przemysław Waściński; Patryk Dobek	3ː06.36	Algeria (ALG); Slimane Moula; Yassine Hethat; Mohamed Belbachir; Abdelmalik Lahoulou	3ː06.67
Marathon	Shumi Dechasa; Bahrain (BHR)	2:08:28 GR	Alphonce Simbu; Tanzania (TAN)	2:11:16	John Hakizimana; Rwanda (RWA)	2:11:19
Team Marathon	Poland (POL); Henryk Szost; Arkadiusz Gardzielewski; Marcin Chabowski; Mariusz Giżyński	6:43:14	North Korea (PRK); Pak Kum-dong; Kim Kwang-hyok; Ri Yong-nam	6:53:20	France (FRA); James Theuri; Matthias Eymard; Romain Courcières; Mathieu Brulet	6:53:34
20 kilometres walk	Xu Hao; China (CHN)	1:22:18	Viktor Shumik; Ukraine (UKR)	1:23:18	Miroslav Úradník; Slovakia (SVK)	1:24:16
50 kilometres walk	Wang Qin; China (CHN)	3:51:56	Dzmitry Dziubin; Belarus (BLR)	3:53:14	Serhiy Budza; Ukraine (UKR)	4:26:03
High jump	Ilya Ivanyuk; Russia (RUS)	2.20 m	Majd Eddin Ghazal; Syria (SYR)	2.20 m	Thomas Carmoy; Belgium (BEL)	2.15 m
Pole vault	Paweł Wojciechowski; Poland (POL)	5.60 m	Augusto Dutra de Oliveira; Brazil (BRA)	5.50 m	Georgiy Gorokhov; Russia (RUS)	5.40 m
Long jump	Wang Jianan; China (CHN)	8.15 m	Huang Changzhou; China (CHN)	8.12 m	Yasser Triki; Algeria (ALG)	8.08 m
Triple jump	Zhu Yaming; China (CHN)	17.09 m	Tomáš Veszelka; Slovakia (SVK)	17.09 m	Yasser Triki; Algeria (ALG)	17.08 m NR
Shot put	Darlan Romani; Brazil (BRA)	22.36 m GR	Konrad Bukowiecki; Poland (POL)	21.84 m	Bob Bertemes; Luxembourg (LUX)	20.66 m
Discus throw	Alin Alexandru Firfirică; Romania (ROU)	63.88 m	Aleksey Khudyakov; Russia (RUS)	61.64 m	Viktor Butenko; Russia (RUS)	59.65 m
Hammer throw	Wojciech Nowicki; Poland (POL)	77.38 m	Yevgeniy Korotovskiy; Russia (RUS)	75.26 m	Denis Lukyanov; Russia (RUS)	72.44 m
Javelin throw	Shivpal Singh; India (IND)	83.33 m	Marcin Krukowski; Poland (POL)	78.17 m	Sumeda Ranasinghe; Sri Lanka (SRI)	75.35 m

=== Women ===
Event	Gold		Silver		Bronze	
100 metres	Carolle Zahi; France (FRA)	11.36	Rosângela Santos; Brazil (BRA)	11.39	Vitória Cristina Rosa; Brazil (BRA)	11.40
200 metres	Maja Mihalinec; Slovenia (SLO)	23.15	Marileidy Paulino; Dominican Republic (DOM)	23.18	Anna Kiełbasińska; Poland (POL)	23.33
400 metres	Salwa Eid Naser; Bahrain (BHR)	50.15 GR	Polina Miller; Russia (RUS)	51.49	Justyna Święty-Ersetic; Poland (POL)	52.19
800 metres	Nataliya Pryshchepa; Ukraine (UKR)	2:05.14	Nimali Liyanarachchi; Sri Lanka (SRI)	2:06.14	Nelly Jepkosgei; Bahrain (BHR)	2:06.50
1500 metres	Winnie Chebet; Kenya (KEN)	4ː25.22	Nataliya Pryshchepa; Ukraine (UKR)	4ː26.63	Nelly Korir; Bahrain (BHR)	4ː26.97
5000 metres	Helalia Johannes; Namibia (NAM)	15:14.23	Winfred Yavi; Bahrain (BHR)	15:15.93	Irene Kimais; Kenya (KEN)	15:29.74
100 metres hurdles	Katsiaryna Paplauskaya; Belarus (BLR)	13.36	Hanna Plotitsyna; Ukraine (UKR)	13.40	Hanna Chubkovtsova; Ukraine (UKR)	13.66
400 metres hurdles	Aminat Yusuf Jamal; Bahrain (BHR)	55.12 GR	Hanna Ryzhykova; Ukraine (UKR)	55.23	Vera Rudakova; Russia (RUS)	55.66
3000 metres steeplechase	Winfred Yavi; Bahrain (BHR)	9:19.24 GR	Maruša Mišmaš; Slovenia (SLO)	9:24.47	Luiza Gega; Albania (ALB)	9:26.35
4 × 100 metres relay	Brazil (BRA); Bruna Farias; Vitória Cristina Rosa; Lorraine Martins; Rosângela Santos	43.29 GR	China (CHN); Yuan Qiqi; Wang Xuan; Kong Lingwei; Ge Manqi	43.45	Bahrain (BHR); Hajar Al-Khaldi; Iman Essa Jassim; Edidiong Odiong; Salwa Eid Naser	44.24
4 × 400 metres relay	Poland (POL); Anna Kiełbasińska; Małgorzata Hołub-Kowalik; Joanna Linkiewicz; Justyna Święty-Ersetic	3ː27.84 GR	Russia (RUS); Alena Mamina; Vera Rudakova; Kseniya Aksyonova; Polina Miller	3ː28.09	Ukraine (UKR); Mariya Mykolenko; Anastasiia Bryzgina; Kateryna Klymiuk; Hanna Ryzhykova	3ː33.68
Marathon	Eunice Chumba; Bahrain (BHR)	2:30:10	Pak Il-sim; North Korea (PRK)	2:30:26	Li Dan; China (CHN)	2:30:33
Team Marathon	North Korea (PRK); Pak Il-sim; Kim Hye-song; Kim Hyang-ok	7:33:58	Poland (POL); Izabela Paszkiewicz; Aleksandra Lisowska; Monika Andrzejczak; Olga Kalendarowa-Ochal	7:35:15	China (CHN); Li Dan; Ma Yugui; Zheng Zhiling	7:50:58
20 kilometres walk	Yang Jiayu; China (CHN)	1:30:03 GR	Yin Hang; China (CHN)	1:33:16	Teresa Zurek; Germany (GER)	1:37:44
High jump	Mariya Lasitskene; Russia (RUS)	2.01 m GR	Yuliya Levchenko; Ukraine (UKR)	1.92 m	Iryna Herashchenko; Ukraine (UKR)	1.90 m
Long jump	Hilary Kpatcha; France (FRA)	6.54 m	Maryse Luzolo; Germany (GER)	6.49 m	Eliane Martins; Brazil (BRA)	6.39 m
Triple jump	Olga Rypakova; Kazakhstan (KAZ)	14.19 m	Ottavia Cestonaro; Italy (ITA)	13.78 m	Ana José Tima; Dominican Republic (DOM)	13.54 m
Shot put	Paulina Guba; Poland (POL)	18.22 m	Gao Yang; China (CHN)	17.85 m	Noora Salem Jasim; Bahrain (BHR)	17.70 m
Discus throw	Feng Bin; China (CHN)	64.83 m GR	Fernanda Martins; Brazil (BRA)	61.60 m	Chrysoula Anagnostopoulou; Greece (GRE)	58.27 m
Hammer throw	Wang Zheng; China (CHN)	69.34 m	Martina Hrašnová; Slovakia (SVK)	68.89 m	Malwina Kopron; Poland (POL)	67.12 m
Javelin throw	Zhang Li; China (CHN)	63.06 m GR	Laila Domingos; Brazil (BRA)	56.02 m	Nadeeka Lakmali; Sri Lanka (SRI)	52.73 m

=== Para Athletics ===
29 Para Athletics events not counted in medal table.

== Medal table ==
* Host nation (China)

Rank	Nation	Gold	Silver	Bronze	Total
1	China*	8	5	2	15
2	Bahrain	8	1	6	15
3	Poland	7	4	5	16
4	Brazil	4	5	2	11
5	Russia	3	4	4	11
6	Kenya	2	1	2	5
7	France	2	0	3	5
8	Iran	2	0	0	2
9	Ukraine	1	6	4	11
10	North Korea	1	2	0	3
11	Morocco	1	1	1	3
12	Belarus	1	1	0	2
12	Slovenia	1	1	0	2
14	India	1	0	0	1
14	Kazakhstan	1	0	0	1
14	Namibia	1	0	0	1
14	Romania	1	0	0	1
18	Germany	0	3	1	4
19	Algeria	0	2	3	5
20	Slovakia	0	2	1	3
21	Dominican Republic	0	1	3	4
22	Sri Lanka	0	1	2	3
23	Italy	0	1	0	1
23	Oman	0	1	0	1
23	Saudi Arabia	0	1	0	1
23	Syria	0	1	0	1
23	Tanzania	0	1	0	1
28	Albania	0	0	1	1
28	Belgium	0	0	1	1
28	Greece	0	0	1	1
28	Kuwait	0	0	1	1
28	Luxembourg	0	0	1	1
28	Rwanda	0	0	1	1
Totals (33 entries)		45	45	45	135
