= Belgium at the 2019 Military World Games =

- Flag of Belgium
- IOC code: BEL

in Wuhan, China 18 October 2019 – 27 October 2019
- Medals Ranked 28th: Gold 1 Silver 1 Bronze 1 Total 3

Military World Games appearances
- 1995; 1999; 2003; 2007; 2011; 2015; 2019; 2023

Belgium competed at the 2019 Military World Games held in Wuhan, China from 18 to 27 October 2019. In total, athletes representing Belgium won one gold medal, one silver medal and one bronze medal. The country finished in 28th place in the medal table.

== Medal summary ==
=== Medal by sports ===
Medals by sport
Sport	1st place, gold medalist(s)	2nd place, silver medalist(s)	3rd place, bronze medalist(s)	Total
Athletics	0	0	1	1
Triathlon	0	1	0	1
Parachuting	1	0	0	1

=== Medalists ===
Medal	Name	Sport	Event
Gold	Men's team	Parachuting	Men's Formation Skydive
Silver	Marten van Riel	Triathlon	Men's triathlon
Bronze	Thomas Carmoy	Athletics	Men's high jump
