= Dominican Republic at the 2019 Military World Games =

- Flag of Dominican Republic
- IOC code: DOM

in Wuhan, China 18 October 2019 – 27 October 2019
- Medals Ranked 39th: Gold 0 Silver 2 Bronze 3 Total 5

Military World Games appearances
- 1995; 1999; 2003; 2007; 2011; 2015; 2019; 2023

Dominican Republic competed at the 2019 Military World Games held in Wuhan, China from 18 to 27 October 2019. In total, athletes representing Dominican Republic won two silver medals and three bronze medals. The country finished in 39th place in the medal table.

== Medal summary ==
=== Medal by sports ===
Medals by sport
Sport	1st place, gold medalist(s)	2nd place, silver medalist(s)	3rd place, bronze medalist(s)	Total
Athletics	0	1	3	4
Taekwondo	0	1	0	1

=== Medalists ===
Medal	Name	Sport	Event
Silver	Marileidy Paulino	Athletics	Women's 200 metres
Silver	Moisés Hernández	Taekwondo	Men's -80 kg
Bronze	Yancarlos Martínez	Athletics	Men's 200 metres
Bronze	Christopher Valdez Guzman; Yohandris Andújar; Lidio Andres Feliz; Yancarlos Martínez	Athletics	Men's 4 × 100 metres relay
Bronze	Ana José Tima	Athletics	Women's triple jump
