= Sri Lanka at the 2019 Military World Games =

- IOC code: SRI

in Wuhan, China 18 October - 27 October
- Medals: Gold 0 Silver 1 Bronze 2 Total 3

Military World Games appearances
- 1995; 1999; 2003; 2007; 2011; 2015; 2019; 2023

Sri Lanka at the 2019 Military World Games claimed 3 medals as of 25 October 2019 in track and field events. Sri Lanka competed at the 2019 Military World Games in Wuhan from 18 to 27 October 2019. Sri Lanka sent a delegation consisting of athletes for the event.

== Medal summary ==
=== Medal by sports ===
Medals by sport
Sport	1st place, gold medalist(s)	2nd place, silver medalist(s)	3rd place, bronze medalist(s)	Total
Athletics	0	1	2	2

=== Medalists ===
Medal	Name	Sport	Event
Silver	Nimali Liyanarachchi	Athletics	Women's 800m
Bronze	Sumeda Ranasinghe	Athletics	Men's javelin throw
Bronze	Nadeeka Lakmali	Athletics	Women's javelin throw
