= Oman at the 2019 Military World Games =

- Flag of Oman
- IOC code: OMA

in Wuhan, China 18 October 2019 – 27 October 2019
- Medals Ranked 46th: Gold 0 Silver 1 Bronze 1 Total 2

Military World Games appearances
- 1995; 1999; 2003; 2007; 2011; 2015; 2019; 2023

Oman competed at the 2019 Military World Games held in Wuhan, China from 18 to 27 October 2019. In total, athletes representing Oman won one silver and one bronze medal and the country finished in 46th place in the medal table.

== Medal summary ==
=== Medal by sports ===
Medals by sport
Sport	1st place, gold medalist(s)	2nd place, silver medalist(s)	3rd place, bronze medalist(s)	Total
Athletics	0	1	0	1
Beach volleyball	0	0	1	1

=== Medalists ===
Medal	Name	Sport	Event
Silver	Fatek Adnan Awadh Bait Qisan; Barakat Al-Harthi; Mohamed Obaid Al-Saadi; Abdulaziz Samir Al-Riyami	Athletics	Men's 4 × 100 metres relay
Bronze	Nouh Aljalbubi; Mazin Alhashmi	Beach volleyball	Men's tournament
