= Slovakia at the 2019 Military World Games =

- IOC code: SVK

in Wuhan, China 18 October 2019 – 27 October 2019
- Medals Ranked 40th: Gold 0 Silver 2 Bronze 1 Total 3

Military World Games appearances
- 1995; 1999; 2003; 2007; 2011; 2015; 2019; 2023

Slovakia competed at the 2019 Military World Games held in Wuhan, China from 18 to 27 October 2019. In total, athletes representing Slovakia won two silver medals and one bronze medal. All medals were won in athletics and the country finished in 40th place in the medal table.

== Medal summary ==
=== Medal by sports ===
Medals by sport
Sport	1st place, gold medalist(s)	2nd place, silver medalist(s)	3rd place, bronze medalist(s)	Total
Athletics	0	2	1	3

=== Medalists ===
Medal	Name	Sport	Event
Silver	Tomáš Veszelka	Athletics	Men's triple jump
Silver	Martina Hrašnová	Athletics	Women's hammer throw
Bronze	Miroslav Úradník	Athletics	Men's 20 kilometres walk
