= Saudi Arabia at the 2019 Military World Games =

- IOC code: KSA

in Wuhan, China 18 October - 27 October
- Competitors: 41 in 5 sports
- Medals Ranked 49th: Gold 0 Silver 1 Bronze 0 Total 1

Military World Games appearances
- 1995; 1999; 2003; 2007; 2011; 2015; 2019; 2023

Saudi Arabia competed at the 2019 Military World Games in Wuhan from 18 to 27 October 2019. It sent a delegation consisting of 41 athletes competing in five sports for the event.

== Participants ==
Sport	Men	Women	Total
Taekwondo	6	0	6
Table Tennis	4	0	4
Cycling	6	0	6
Track and field	16	0	16
Shooting	9	0	9

== Medal summary ==
=== Medal by sports ===
Medals by sport
Sport	1st place, gold medalist(s)	2nd place, silver medalist(s)	3rd place, bronze medalist(s)	Total
Athletics	0	1	0	1

=== Medalists ===
Medal	Name	Sport	Event
Silver	Mazen Al-Yasen	Athletics	men's 400m
