= Marta Leśniak =

Polish tennis player

- Country (sports): Poland
- Born: 15 March 1988 (age 37) Wrocław, Poland
- Plays: Right (two handed-backhand)
- College: SMU Mustangs
- Prize money: $39,305

Singles
- Career record: 105–35
- Career titles: 10 ITF
- Highest ranking: No. 418 (12 February 2018)

Doubles
- Career record: 24–21
- Career titles: 2 ITF
- Highest ranking: No. 424 (21 March 2005)
Medal record
Women's tennis
Representing Poland
Military World Games
Bronze medal – third place	2019 Wuhan	Women's singles
Bronze medal – third place	2019 Wuhan	Mixed doubles

Marta Leśniak (born 15 March 1988) is a Polish former professional tennis player.

Leśniak won ten singles and two doubles titles on the ITF Circuit during her career. On 12 February 2018, she reached her best singles ranking of world No. 418. On 21 March 2005, she peaked at No. 424 in the doubles rankings.

In 2019, she played for Poland at the Military World Games in Wuhan, China where she won two bronze medals, in women's singles and mixed doubles.

Leśniak decided to follow the college route and played for the Southern Methodist University SMU Mustangs varsity tennis team from 2008 to 2011.

She reached the final of the Polish national tennis championships in 2016, and was defeated by Anastasiya Shoshyna in straight sets.

== ITF Circuit finals ==
=== Singles: 12 (10 titles, 2 runner–ups) ===
Legend $25,000 tournaments $15,000 tournaments $10,000 tournaments	Finals by surface Hard (2–0) Clay (8–2) Carpet (0–0)

Result	W–L	Date	Tournament	Tier	Surface	Opponent	Score
Loss	0–1	Aug 2003	ITF Kedzierzyn-Kozle, Poland	10,000	Clay	(Czech Republic) Kateřina Böhmová	6–2, 2–6, 2–6
Win	1–1	Jun 2004	ITF Kedzierzyn-Kozle, Poland	10,000	Clay	(Ukraine) Oksana Uzhylovska	6–2, 6–4
Win	2–1	Jun 2004	ITF Alkmaar, Netherlands	10,000	Clay	(United States) Carly Gullickson	6–2, 6–3
Win	3–1	Apr 2017	ITF Antalya, Turkey	15,000	Clay	(Russia) Alena Tarasova	6–3, 6–2
Win	4–1	Aug 2017	ITF Mragowo, Poland	15,000	Clay	(Australia) Seone Mendez	6–4, 6–4
Win	5–1	Aug 2017	ITF Mragowo, Poland	15,000	Clay	(France) Jade Suvrijn	5–7, 6–2, 6–2
Loss	5–2	Sep 2017	ITF Mragowo, Poland	15,000	Clay	(Czech Republic) Monika Kilnarová	5–7, 6–1, 1–6
Win	6–2	Oct 2017	ITF Antalya, Turkey	15,000	Clay	(Russia) Amina Anshba	6–3, 6–1
Win	7–2	Jul 2018	ITF Vienna, Austria	15,000	Clay	(United Kingdom) Francesca Jones	6–0, 6–3
Win	8–2	Sep 2018	ITF Frydek Mistek, Czech Republic	15,000	Clay	(Czech Republic) Gabriela Pantucková	6–7^{(6)}, 6–2, 6–3
Win	9–2	Nov 2018	ITF Antalya, Turkey	15,000	Hard	(Germany) Franziska Sziedat	6–1, 6–1
Win	10–2	Feb 2019	ITF Monastir, Tunisia	15,000	Hard	(Spain) Andrea Lázaro García	2–6, 6–0, 6–0

=== Doubles: 3 (2 titles, 1 runner–up) ===
Legend $60,000 tournaments $25,000 tournaments $15,000 tournaments	Finals by surface Hard (1–0) Clay (1–1) Carpet (0–0)

Result	W–L	Date	Tournament	Tier	Surface	Partner	Opponents	Score
Loss	0–1	Jul 2004	ITF Torún, Poland	25,000	Clay	(Germany) Angelique Kerber	(Hungary) Kyra Nagy (Czech Republic) Gabriela Chmelinová	4–6, 6–7^{(2)}
Win	1–1	Sep 2017	ITF Mragowo, Poland	15,000	Clay	(Poland) Daria Kuczer	(Italy) Angelica Moratelli (France) Marine Partaud	6–2, 6–3
Win	2–1	Feb 2019	ITF Monastir, Tunisia	15,000	Hard	(Poland) Magdalena Hedrzak	(France) Vinciane Remy (France) Marie Témin	6–2, 6–2
