= Greece at the 2019 Military World Games =

- IOC code: GRE

in Wuhan, China 18 October 2019 – 27 October 2019
- Medals Ranked 56th: Gold 0 Silver 0 Bronze 1 Total 1

Military World Games appearances
- 1995; 1999; 2003; 2007; 2011; 2015; 2019; 2023

Greece competed at the 2019 Military World Games held in Wuhan, China from 18 to 27 October 2019. In total, athletes representing Greece won one bronze medal and the country finished in 56th place in the medal table.

== Medal summary ==
=== Medal by sports ===
Medals by sport
Sport	1st place, gold medalist(s)	2nd place, silver medalist(s)	3rd place, bronze medalist(s)	Total
Athletics	0	0	1	1

=== Medalists ===
Medal	Name	Sport	Event
Bronze	Chrysoula Anagnostopoulou	Athletics	Women's discus throw
