= Tennis at the 2019 Military World Games =

- Venues: Optics Valley International Tennis Center
- Dates: 22 – 26 October

Tennis at the 2019 Military World Games was held in Wuhan, China from 22 to 26 October 2019.

== Medal summary ==
=== Results ===
Event	Gold	Silver	Bronze
Men's singles Details	Zhang Zhizhen (CHN)	Wu Di (CHN)	Sriram Balaji (IND)
Men's doubles Details	Gong Maoxin (CHN); Zhang Zhizhen (CHN)	Wu Di (CHN); Zhao Jing (CHN)	Karol Dus (POL); Mateusz Kowalczyk (POL)
Women's singles Details	Han Xinyun (CHN)	Sabina Sharipova (UZB)	Marta Leśniak (POL)
Women's doubles Details	Han Xinyun (CHN); Ye Qiuyu (CHN)	Guo Hanyu (CHN); Sun Shengnan (CHN)	Sabina Sharipova (UZB); Yasmina Karimjanova (UZB)
Mixed doubles Details	Wu Di (CHN); Ye Qiuyu (CHN)	Gong Maoxin (CHN); Han Xinyun (CHN)	Mateusz Kowalczyk (POL); Marta Leśniak (POL)

=== Medal table ===
* Host nation (China)

Rank	Nation	Gold	Silver	Bronze	Total
1	China*	5	4	0	9
2	Uzbekistan	0	1	1	2
3	Poland	0	0	3	3
4	India	0	0	1	1
Totals (4 entries)		5	5	5	15

== Men's singles ==
=== Key ===
- Q = Qualifier
- WC = Wild card
- LL = Lucky loser
- Alt = Alternate
- ITF = ITF entry
- PR = Protected ranking
- SR = Special ranking
- SE = Special exempt
- JE = Junior exempt
- JR = Junior Accelerator Programme entrant
- CO = College Accelerator Programme entrant
- NG = Next Gen Accelerator Program entrant
- w/o = Walkover
- r = Retired
- d = Defaulted

First round
1	(China) Zhang Zhizhen	6	6
(Bulgaria) Yordan Nikov	1	0
(Brazil) João Correa	0	1
(Vietnam) Huỳnh Chí Khương	6	6
3	(Uzbekistan) Jurabek Karimov	6	6
(China) Zhao Jing	2	3
(India) Sriram Balaji	6	6
(Poland) Mateusz Kowalczyk	3	3
(Brazil) Rodolfo Rodrigues	1	0
(China) Gong Maoxin	6	6
(India) Dalwinder Singh	5	2
4	(Uzbekistan) Sergey Fomin	7	6
(India) Ishaque Eqbal	6	6
(Vietnam) Tran Hoang Anh Khoa	2	2
(Poland) Karol Dus	1	2
2	(China) Wu Di	6	6

Quarterfinals
1	(China) Zhang Zhizhen	6	6
(Vietnam) Huỳnh Chí Khương	2	1
3	(Uzbekistan) Jurabek Karimov	0^{r}
(India) Sriram Balaji	1
(China) Gong Maoxin	3	4
4	(Uzbekistan) Sergey Fomin	6	6
(India) Ishaque Eqbal	1	2
2	(China) Wu Di	6	6

Semifinals
1	(China) Zhang Zhizhen	6	6
(India) Sriram Balaji	3	4
4	(Uzbekistan) Sergey Fomin	5	0
2	(China) Wu Di	7	6

Final (gold-medal match)
1	(China) Zhang Zhizhen	7^{8}	6
2	(China) Wu Di	6^{6}	3
Bronze-medal match
(India) Sriram Balaji	6	6
4	(Uzbekistan) Sergey Fomin	2	3

== Men's doubles ==
=== Key ===
- Q = Qualifier
- WC = Wild card
- LL = Lucky loser
- Alt = Alternate
- ITF = ITF entry
- PR = Protected ranking
- SR = Special ranking
- SE = Special exempt
- JE = Junior exempt
- JR = Junior Accelerator Programme entrant
- CO = College Accelerator Programme entrant
- NG = Next Gen Accelerator Program entrant
- w/o = Walkover
- r = Retired
- d = Defaulted

Quarterfinals
(Poland) Karol Dus (Poland) Mateusz Kowalczyk	6	6
(Brazil) João Correa (Brazil) Rodolfo Rodrigues	0	1
(China) Wu Di (China) Zhao Jing	6	3	[10]
(India) Sriram Balaji (India) Dalwinder Singh	2	6	[7]
(Vietnam) Huỳnh Chí Khương (Vietnam) Tran Hoang Anh Khoa	2	3
2	(Uzbekistan) Jurabek Karimov (Uzbekistan) Sergey Fomin	6	6

Semifinals
1	(China) Gong Maoxin (China) Zhang Zhizhen	6	6
(Poland) Karol Dus (Poland) Mateusz Kowalczyk	4	4
(China) Wu Di (China) Zhao Jing	w/o
2	(Uzbekistan) Jurabek Karimov (Uzbekistan) Sergey Fomin

Final (gold-medal match)
1	(China) Gong Maoxin (China) Zhang Zhizhen	6	4	[10]
(China) Wu Di (China) Zhao Jing	1	6	[3]
Bronze-medal match
(Poland) Karol Dus (Poland) Mateusz Kowalczyk	w/o
2	(Uzbekistan) Jurabek Karimov (Uzbekistan) Sergey Fomin

== Women's singles ==
=== Key ===
- Q = Qualifier
- WC = Wild card
- LL = Lucky loser
- Alt = Alternate
- ITF = ITF entry
- PR = Protected ranking
- SR = Special ranking
- SE = Special exempt
- JE = Junior exempt
- JR = Junior Accelerator Programme entrant
- CO = College Accelerator Programme entrant
- NG = Next Gen Accelerator Program entrant
- w/o = Walkover
- r = Retired
- d = Defaulted

Quarterfinals
1	(China) Han Xinyun	6	6
(Poland) Zuzanna Wilk	0	0
(Uzbekistan) Yasmina Karimjanova	1	5
(China) Ye Qiuyu	6	7
(Poland) Marta Leśniak	6	6
(China) Guo Hanyu	4	1
(China) Sun Shengnan	7^{7}	1	3
2	(Uzbekistan) Sabina Sharipova	6^{5}	6	6

Semifinals
1	(China) Han Xinyun	6	5	6
(China) Ye Qiuyu	1	7	1
(Poland) Marta Leśniak	6	3	3
2	(Uzbekistan) Sabina Sharipova	3	6	6

Final (gold-medal match)
1	(China) Han Xinyun	6	6^{4}	6
2	(Uzbekistan) Sabina Sharipova	1	7^{7}	0
Bronze-medal match
(China) Ye Qiuyu	0	6^{6}
(Poland) Marta Leśniak	6	7^{8}

== Women's doubles ==
=== Key ===
- Q = Qualifier
- WC = Wild card
- LL = Lucky loser
- Alt = Alternate
- ITF = ITF entry
- PR = Protected ranking
- SR = Special ranking
- SE = Special exempt
- JE = Junior exempt
- JR = Junior Accelerator Programme entrant
- CO = College Accelerator Programme entrant
- NG = Next Gen Accelerator Program entrant
- w/o = Walkover
- r = Retired
- d = Defaulted

Semifinals
1	(China) Han Xinyun (China) Ye Qiuyu	6	6
(Poland) Marta Leśniak (Poland) Zuzanna Wilk	2	4
(China) Guo Hanyu (China) Sun Shengnan	6	6
2	(Uzbekistan) Sabina Sharipova (Uzbekistan) Yasmina Karimjanova	3	2

Final (gold-medal match)
1	(China) Han Xinyun (China) Ye Qiuyu	5	6	[10]
(China) Guo Hanyu (China) Sun Shengnan	7	3	[5]
Bronze-medal match
(Poland) Marta Leśniak (Poland) Zuzanna Wilk	0	2
2	(Uzbekistan) Sabina Sharipova (Uzbekistan) Yasmina Karimjanova	6	6

== Mixed doubles ==
=== Key ===
- Q = Qualifier
- WC = Wild card
- LL = Lucky loser
- Alt = Alternate
- ITF = ITF entry
- PR = Protected ranking
- SR = Special ranking
- SE = Special exempt
- JE = Junior exempt
- JR = Junior Accelerator Programme entrant
- CO = College Accelerator Programme entrant
- NG = Next Gen Accelerator Program entrant
- w/o = Walkover
- r = Retired
- d = Defaulted

Quarterfinals
(Uzbekistan) Sergey Fomin (Uzbekistan) Yasmina Karimjanova	4	3
(Poland) Mateusz Kowalczyk (Poland) Marta Leśniak	6	6

Semifinals
1	(China) Gong Maoxin (China) Han Xinyun	6	6
(Uzbekistan) Jurabek Karimov (Uzbekistan) Sabina Sharipova	1	2
(Poland) Mateusz Kowalczyk (Poland) Marta Leśniak	6^{3}	3
2	(China) Wu Di (China) Ye Qiuyu	7^{7}	6

Final (gold-medal match)
1	(China) Gong Maoxin (China) Han Xinyun	3	3
2	(China) Wu Di (China) Ye Qiuyu	6	6
Bronze-medal match
(Uzbekistan) Jurabek Karimov (Uzbekistan) Sabina Sharipova
(Poland) Mateusz Kowalczyk (Poland) Marta Leśniak	w/o
