= Triathlon at the 2019 Military World Games =

- Dates: 27 October

Triathlon at the 2019 Military World Games was held in Wuhan, China on 27 October 2019.

== Medal summary ==
Event	Gold	Silver	Bronze
Men	Pierre le Corre; France	Marten van Riel; Belgium	Dorian Coninx; France
Women	Jolanda Annen; Switzerland	Elena Danilova; Russia	Vittoria Lopes; Brazil
Men team	Russia; Igor Andreyevich Polyanski; Dmitry Polyanski; Aleksandr Briukhankov	France; Pierre le Corre; Dorian Coninx; Thomas Pietrera	Brazil; Kaue Willy; Diogo Sclebin; Matheus Diniz
Women team	Brazil; Vittoria Lopes; Luisa Baptista; Beatriz Neres	Russia; Elena Danilova; Anastasiia Abrosimova; Anastasiia Gorbunova	China; Zhang Yi; Wei Wen; Wu Qing
Mixed team	Russia; Elena Danilova; Igor Andreyevich Polyanski; Dmitry Polyanski; Aleksandr Briukhankov	Brazil; Vittoria Lopes; Kaue Willy; Diogo Sclebin; Matheus Diniz	China; Zhang Yi; Li Mingxu; Bai Faquan; Xu Zheng
