= Parachuting at the 2019 Military World Games =

- Dates: 18–25 October

Parachuting at the 2019 Military World Games was held in Wuhan, China from 18 to 25 October 2019.

== Medal summary ==
=== Men ===
Event	Gold	Silver	Bronze
Men's Individual Overall	Stefan Wiesner; Germany	Elischa Weber; Germany	Oldrich Sorf; Czech Republic
Men's Individual Style	Elischa Weber; Germany	Libor Jirousek; Czech Republic	Aleksei Bykov; Russia
Men's Team Overall	Germany	Czech Republic	Russia
Men's Team Accuracy	Czech Republic; Libor Jirousek; Jakub Pavlicek; Miloslav Kriz; Bonifac Hajek; Oldrich Sorf	Germany; Christoph Patrik David Zahler; Elischa Weber; Christian Andreas Kautzmann; Kai Stefan Erthel; Stefan Wiesner	China; Li Jialin; Lu Shanmao; Zhang Zuolei; Gao Tianbo; Yang Xin
Men's Individual Junior Overall	Yu Ruilong; China	Gao Tianbo; China	Petr Chladek; Czech Republic
Men's Individual Junior Style	Gao Tianbo; China	Yu Ruilong; China	Petr Chladek; Czech Republic
Men's Formation Skydive	Belgium	Qatar	Switzerland

=== Women ===
Event	Gold	Silver	Bronze
Women's Individual Overall	Xing Yaping; China	Elena Tusheva; Russia	Leocadie Ollivier de Pury; France
Women's Individual Style	Xing Yaping; China	Evgeniia Furman; Russia	Olga Kravchenko; Russia
Women's Team Overall	China	Russia	France
Women's Team Accuracy	China	Russia	Belarus
Women's Individual Junior Overall	Xing Yaping; China	Mariia Elkina; Russia	Kseniia Fominykh; Russia
Women's Individual Junior Style	Xing Yaping; China	Mariia Elkina; Russia	Kseniia Fominykh; Russia
Women's Formation Skydive	Morocco	China	Russia
