= Hubei University of Arts and Science =

Provincial public college in Xiangyang, Hubei, China

The Hubei University of Arts and Science (湖北文理学院; lit. 'Hubei Letters and Science College') is a provincial public undergraduate college in Xiangyang, Hubei, China. It is affiliated with the Province of Hubei and sponsored by the Hubei Provincial People's Government. Despite the English name, the college has not been granted university status by the Ministry of Education of China.

The school's predecessor, Xiangfan College (襄樊学院), was established in 1998 by the merger of the Xiangyang Normal Senior Vocational School (襄阳师范高等专科学校), the Xiangfan Vocational University (襄樊职业大学), and the Xiangfan Education College (襄樊教育学院). In 2000, the Hubei Provincial Arts and Crafts School (湖北省工艺美术学校) was integrated into the school. In 2012, the school was renamed Hubei Letters and Science College.
