= Football at the 2019 Military World Games =

- Venues: 2
- Dates: 16 – 27 October

Medalists
gold medal	Bahrain (men); North Korea (women)
silver medal	Qatar (men); China (women)
bronze medal	Algeria (men); Brazil (women)

Football at the 2019 Military World Games was held in Wuhan, China from 16 to 27 October 2019.

== Venues ==
Below the list of different venues of the football tournament.

== Medal summary ==
=== Results ===
Event	Gold	Silver	Bronze
Men	Bahrain	Qatar	Algeria
Women	North Korea	China	Brazil

=== Medal table ===
* Host nation (China)

Rank	Nation	Gold	Silver	Bronze	Total
1	Bahrain	1	0	0	1
1	North Korea	1	0	0	1
3	China*	0	1	0	1
3	Qatar	0	1	0	1
5	Algeria	0	0	1	1
5	Brazil	0	0	1	1
Totals (6 entries)		2	2	2	6
