= Wuhan Vocational College of Software and Engineering =

Public college in Wuhan, Hubei, China

Coordinates: 30.4501°N 114.4294°E

- 武汉软件工程职业学院
- Type: Public
- Established: 1979
- Location: Wuhan, Hubei, China
- Campus: Urban, 1,200 mu
- Website: www.whvcse.com

The Wuhan Vocational College of Software and Engineering (武汉软件工程职业学院) is a municipal public vocational college in Wuhan, Hubei, China. It is affiliated with and sponsored by the Wuhan City People's Government.

There are more than 700 faculty staff and more than 14,000 students.

== History ==
WHVCSE was founded by combining two vocational colleges, Wuhan Vocational College of Software (武汉软件职业学院) and Wuhan Vocational College of Industry and Traffic (武汉工交职业学院), in 2007.

== Departments ==
- School of Computer and Software
- Department of Mechanical Manufacture Engineering
- Department of Electronic and Electrical Engineering
- Department of Photoelectron and Communication Engineering
- Department of Automobile Application Engineering
- Department of Economics and Management
- Department of Art and Design
- Department of Environmental and Bio-chemical Engineering
- Department of Fundamental Courses and Department of Physical Education
