= Volleyball at the 2019 Military World Games =

Sport event

- Venues: 4
- Dates: 16 – 26 October

Volleyball at the 2019 Military World Games is held in Wuhan, China from 16 to 26 October 2019.

== Medal summary ==
=== Results ===
==== Indoor volleyball ====
Event	Gold	Silver	Bronze
Men	China	South Korea	Pakistan
Women	Brazil	China	North Korea

==== Beach volleyball ====
Event	Gold	Silver	Bronze
Men	Bruno Oscar Schmidt (BRA); Evandro Oliveira (BRA)	Bennet Poniewaz (GER); David Poniewaz (GER)	Nouh Aljalbubi (OMA); Mazin Alhashmi (OMA)
Women	Wang Fan (CHN); Xia Xinyi (CHN)	Taiana Lima (BRA); Talita Antunes (BRA)	Nadezda Makroguzova (RUS); Daria Rudykh (RUS)

=== Medal table ===
* Host nation (China)

Rank	Nation	Gold	Silver	Bronze	Total
1	Brazil	2	1	0	3
1	China*	2	1	0	3
3	Germany	0	1	0	1
3	South Korea	0	1	0	1
5	North Korea	0	0	1	1
5	Oman	0	0	1	1
5	Pakistan	0	0	1	1
5	Russia	0	0	1	1
Totals (8 entries)		4	4	4	12
