= 2019 Military World Games =

7th CISM Military World Games

VII Military World Games
- Host city: Wuhan, Hubei, China
- Motto: Military Glory, World Peace (Chinese: 创军人荣耀 筑世界和平; pinyin: Chuàng jūnrén róngyào zhù shìjiè hépíng)
- Nations: 110
- Athletes: 9,308
- Events: 316 events in 27 sports
- Opening: October 18, 2019
- Closing: October 27, 2019
- Opened by: CCP General Secretary and Chinese President Xi Jinping
- Athlete's Oath: Yuan Xinyue
- Judge's Oath: Wen Keming
- Main venue: Wuhan Sports Center
- Website: web.archive.org/web/20200126043946/https://en.wuhan2019mwg.cn/ (archived)

Summer

Winter

The 2019 Military World Games (Chinese: 2019年世界军人运动会; pinyin: nián shìjiè jūnrén yùndònghuì), officially known as the 7th CISM Military World Games, (Chinese: 第七届世界军人运动会; pinyin: dì qī jiè shìjiè jūnrén yùndònghuì) and commonly known as Wuhan 2019, was held from October 18–27, 2019, in Wuhan, Hubei, China.

The 7th Military World Games was the first international military multisport event to be held in China. The event was also the nation's largest military sports event ever with 9,308 athletes from 110 countries competing in 329 events and 27 sporting disciplines. The multisport event included 25 official and two demonstrative sports. Six sport disciplines such as badminton, tennis, table tennis, women's boxing, and men's gymnastics made their debuts in the event.

The Military World Games was also the second biggest international sport event to be held in 2019. The Games were organized by the Military Sports Commission of China, Ministry of National Defense, and the military commands (Army in accordance with CISM regulations and the rules of the International Sports Federations). For the first time in the history of the Military World Games, an Olympic village was set up for the athletes prior to the commencement of the Games. The village was officially opened for the athletes following the flag-raising ceremony.

Host nation China sent a delegation consisting of 553 participants for the games, which marked the record number of participants to represent a nation at a single Military World Games. Around 230,000 volunteers were recruited for the event.

== Bidding ==
Following the conclusion of the 2015 Military World Games, China won the bid to host the Games for the first time.

== Venues ==
The event was held in 35 venues. The Wuhan Sports Center hosted a soccer competition for both men and women held from October 16–27.

=== Houhu block ===
==== Wuhan Five Rings Sports Center ====
Venue	Sport	Capacity
Stadium	Athletics (Track and field)	30,000
Gymnasium	Table tennis	7,559
Natatorium	Lifesaving	1,090

==== Others ====
Venue	Sport	Capacity
Aeronautical Pentathlon Flying Contest Venue	Aeronautical Pentathlon (Flying Contest)	n/a
Mulan Lake Campus of PLA Naval University of Engineering	Naval Pentathlon (Lifesaving, Utility Swimming, Obstacle Race, Seamanship Race and Amphibious Cross-Country Race)	1,300
Air Force Early Warning Academy Venues	Aeronautical Pentathlon (Air Pistol Shooting, Swimming, Fencing, Basketball and Obstacle Race)	1,000
Wuhan National Fitness Center	Soccer	8,400
Hankou Culture and Sports Center	Soccer	8,756
Wuhan Gymnasium	Taekwondo	2,430

=== Zhuankou block ===
==== Wuhan Sports Center ====
Venue	Sport	Capacity
Stadium	Opening and closing ceremonies	58,000
Gymnasium	Women's Volleyball	12,000
Natatorium	Swimming, Diving	3,500

==== Others ====
Venue	Sport	Capacity
Jianghan University Gymnasium	Men's Volleyball	2,300
Hannan Municipal Airport	Parachuting	n/a
Tianwaitian Golf Course	Men's golf	n/a
Wuhan Business University Natatorium	Modern Pentathlon (Swimming)	514
Wuhan Business University Gymnasium	Modern Pentathlon (fencing)	2,185
Wuhan Business University Equestrian Venue	Equestrian, Modern pentathlon (Riding and Laser-Run)	2,120
Hanyang District Beach Volleyball Center	Women's Beach Volleyball	1,160
Caidian National Defense Park	Archery	2,110
Caidian National Defense Park	Shooting (25/ 50 m Pistol/ Rifle, Trap/ Skeet)	3,600
Main Media Center	Broadcast, Press	n/a

=== Guanggu block ===
Venue	Sport	Capacity
Wuhan Sports University Gymnasium	Boxing	3,800
Hongshan Gymnasium	Men's Basketball	8,000
Optics Valley International Tennis Center	Tennis (demonstration)	13,722
East Lake Greenway Marathon and Road Cycling Venues	Athletics (marathon) and Cycling (road)	n/a
Wuhan Vocational College of Software and Engineering Gymnasium	Wrestling	1,353
Huazhong University of Science and Technology Optics Valley Gymnasium	Women's Basketball	6,316
Yishan Golf Course	Women's Golf	n/a
Wuhan University of Technology Gymnasium	Judo	5,212
Ordnance NCO Academy, Army Engineering University of PLA Venues	Cross-Country and Military Pentathlon (Obstacle swimming)	2,280
East Lake Sailing and Open Water Swimming Venues	Sailing and Open Water Swimming	n/a
East Lake Hi-Tech Development Zone	Shooting (300 m Rifle), Military Pentathlon (Shooting, Throwing, Obstacle Run)	n/a
Hubei Olympic Center Gymnasium	Men's Gymnastics (demonstration)	5,294
Wuhan University Student Sports Center	Badminton	8,031
Qingshan District Beach Volleyball Center	Men's Beach Volleyball	1,116

=== Huangjiahu block ===
Venue	Sport	Capacity
Jiangxia District Liangzihu Lake Triathlon Venue	Triathlon	n/a
Jiangxia District Orienteering Venues: Bafenshan; Dahuashan; Qinglongshan; Tianzishan	Orienteering, Aeronautical Pentathlon (Orienteering)	n/a
Wuhan City Polytechnic Gymnasium	Fencing	2,433
Athletes Village	Athletes Village	n/a

== Opening ceremony ==
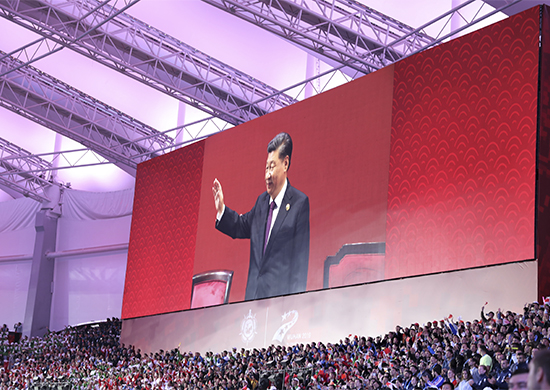
General Secretary of the Chinese Communist Party, Chairman of the Central Military Commission (CMC), President of China Xi Jinping attends the opening ceremony

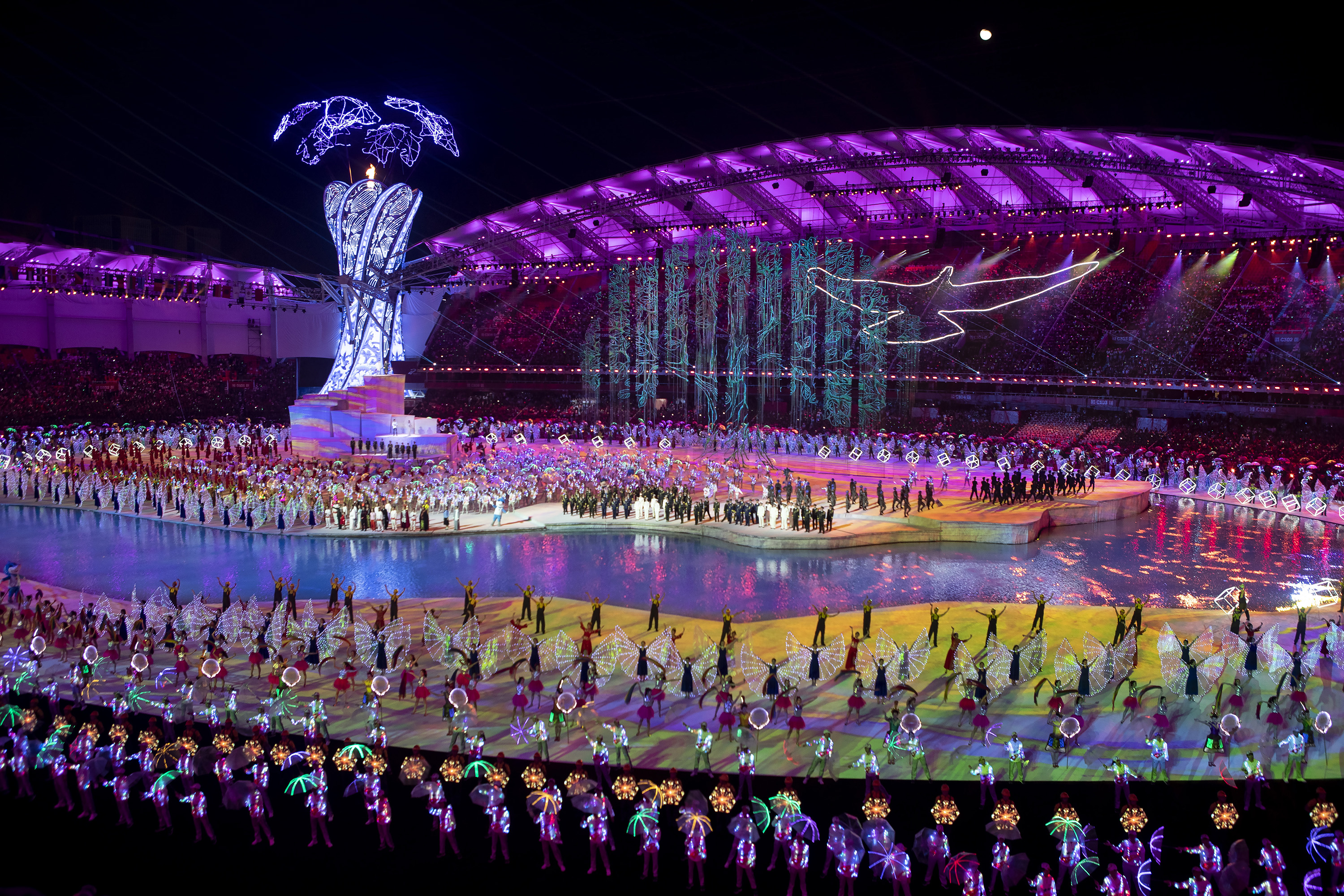
Opening ceremony of the 2019 Military World Games

The opening ceremony was held in Wuhan on 18 October 2019. The event was officially opened by the General Secretary of the Chinese Communist Party, Chairman of the Central Military Commission (CMC), President of China Xi Jinping. An extravaganza titled "Torch of Peace" was performed during the opening ceremony highlighting the main motto of the event.

Prior to the opening ceremony, a light show was set to be staged in the Yangtze River in Wuhan. It featured a screen made up of millions of small LED lights installed on bridges and buildings along the bank of the Yangtze River. The torch relay for the event was held on 16 October 2019 with the participation of 100 torchbearers. Liao Hui, 2008 Olympic gold medalist in weightlifting, began the torch rally while hammer thrower Zhang Wenxiu concluded the torch relay. Flag raising ceremony was also held on 16 October 2019.

== Mascot ==
The emblem and mascot along with the website were unveiled on 24 November 2017 by Ministry of National Defense of China. The mascot, named Bingbing, was designed based on the Chinese sturgeon.

== Marketing ==
An online store and 21 franchised retail stores were newly opened in order to promote the sales of licensed items.

== Sports ==
The competition involved 28 sports.

- Pentathlon
  - Aeronautical pentathlon (5)
  - Military pentathlon (6)
  - Modern pentathlon (5)
  - Naval pentathlon (6)
- Army Sports
  - Orienteering (8)
  - Parachuting (18)
  - Sailing (2)
- Aquatics
  - Diving (12)
  - Open water swimming (5)
  - Swimming (42)
  - Lifesaving (18)
- Main Sports
- Athletics (Athletics and Para Athletics) (45)+(29)
- Cycling (Road Cycling) (6)
- Shooting (25)
- Martial Arts
  - Boxing (15)
  - Fencing (12)
  - Judo (16)
  - Taekwondo (16)
  - Wrestling (18)
- Team Sports
  - Basketball (2)
  - Football (2)
  - Volleyball (Indoor and Beach Volleyball) (4)
- Other Sports
  - Archery (Archery and Para Archery) (5)+(3)
  - Badminton (6)
  - Equestrian (2)
  - Golf (4)
  - Table tennis (6)
  - Triathlon (Triathlon and Senior triathlon) (5)+(3)

Demonstration sports

- Tennis (5)
- Gymnastics
  - Artistic gymnastics (8)

== Records ==
On 20 October 2019, China's Lu Pinpin broke the world record in the women's 500 m obstacle swimming course classified under the military pentathlon with a record timing of 2 minutes and 10.9 seconds.

Overall, 82 records were broken during the nine day multisport event.

== Controversies ==
=== Cheating ===
China's orienteering teams originally captured a gold and a silver medal in women as well as a silver in men. They were all disqualified by the International Orienteering Federation after it was found out that they had been cheating through access to secretly marked paths, and received external assistance thus gaining major unfair advantage over other competitors. A common protest was also held by the competitors from Russia, Switzerland, France, Belgium, Poland, and Austria accusing the Chinese team for gaining a major unfair advantage in the competition.

=== COVID-19 claims ===
Some world games participants developed symptoms of respiratory infections, which created rumors that the 2019 Military World Games spread COVID-19. However, this does not align with the timeline of the COVID-19 pandemic. The world games occurred in October 2019, and the first confirmed cases of COVID-19 in China did not occur until December 2019. The first confirmed cases outside of China did not occur until January 2020, although there is some unconfirmed evidence that COVID-19 was circulating in Europe before the games.

== Participating nations ==
It was reported that 109 nations took part in the event, including athletes from Russia. In September 2019, the International Association of Athletics Federation approved athletes from Russia with the Authorized National Athlete (ANA) status to take part at the event. However, the All Russia Athletics Federation remained silent on the participation of its athletes. The State of Palestine participated in the event, but Israel did not. Of the Commonwealth countries Canada took part along with Malaysia, Pakistan, India, Malta, Cyprus and various Commonwealth African nations but not Great Britain and Northern Ireland, South Africa, Australia and New Zealand.

=== List of participating nations ===
As many as 9,308 athletes from 110 countries participated in the games:

List of Participating Nations

Below is a list of the 110 participating nations (the number of competitors per delegation is indicated in brackets)

- Albania (5)
- Algeria (56)
- Angola (2)
- Argentina (2)
- Armenia (15)
- Austria (37)
- Azerbaijan (20)
- Bahrain (69)
- Barbados (2)
- Belarus (95)
- Belgium (51)
- Bosnia and Herzegovina (11)
- Botswana (15)
- Brazil (329)
- Bulgaria (21)
- Burkina Faso (3)
- Cameroon (55)
- Canada (104)
- Cape Verde (4)
- Chad (11)
- Chile (32)
- China (553)
- Colombia (31)
- Republic of the Congo (19)
- Croatia (11)
- Cyprus (8)
- Czech Republic (27)
- Democratic Republic of the Congo (26)
- Denmark (61)
- Djibouti (3)
- Dominican Republic (31)
- Ecuador (57)
- Egypt (83)
- Eritrea (3)
- Estonia (27)
- Eswatini (27)
- Finland (53)
- France (273)
- Gabon (9)
- Gambia (3)
- Germany (167)
- Greece (43)
- Guatemala (13)
- Guinea (4)
- Guyana (4)
- Hungary (56)
- India (54)
- Indonesia (27)
- Iran (90)
- Ireland (32)
- Italy (139)
- Jordan (5)
- Kazakhstan (62)
- Kenya (14)
- Kuwait (35)
- Latvia (32)
- Lebanon (7)
- Lithuania (56)
- Luxembourg (18)
- Mongolia (75)
- Malta (3)
- Monaco (2)
- Montenegro (2)
- Morocco (24)
- Myanmar (44)
- Namibia (3)
- Netherlands (89)
- North Korea (156)
- North Macedonia (4)
- Nepal (40)
- Niger (3)
- Nigeria (12)
- Norway (28)
- Oman (63)
- Pakistan (19)
- Palestine (9)
- Peru (15)
- Poland (193)
- Portugal (9)
- Qatar (99)
- Romania (77)
- Russia (243)
- Rwanda (41)
- Saudi Arabia (41)
- Senegal (3)
- Serbia (41)
- Slovakia (14)
- Slovenia (32)
- South Korea (172)
- Spain (111)
- Sri Lanka (73)
- Sweden (72)
- Switzerland (67)
- Syria (15)
- Tanzania (22)
- Thailand (55)
- Togo (3)
- Turkmenistan (4)
- Tunisia (22)
- Turkey (20)
- Uganda (5)
- Ukraine (87)
- United Arab Emirates (29)
- United States (172)
- Uruguay (36)
- Uzbekistan (17)
- Venezuela (84)
- Vietnam (32)
- Zambia (13)
- Zimbabwe (28)

== Calendar ==
OC	Opening ceremony	●	Event competitions	1	Gold medal events	CC	Closing ceremony

October		16th Wed	17th Thu	18th Fri	19th Sat	20th Sun	21st Mon	22nd Tue	23rd Wed	24th Thu	25th Fri	26th Sat	27th Sun	Events
Ceremonies				OC									CC	—N/a
Aeronautical pentathlon					1		●	●	●	4				5
Archery						●	●	●	3	2				5
Athletics								8	8	12	7	6	4	45
Badminton							●	●	1	●	●	5		6
Basketball					●	●	●	●	●	●	●	2		2
Boxing					●	●	●	●	●		5	10		15
Cycling					2	2	2							6
Diving										3	3	4	2	12
Equestrian					●	●	2							2
Fencing					2	2	2	2	2	2				12
Football		●	●	●	●	●	●		●	●	●	1	1	2
Golf					●	●	●	2	2					4
Judo					7	7		2						16
Lifesaving						6	6	6						18
Military pentathlon					●	●	●	●	4	2				6
Modern pentathlon								●	●	2	2	1		5
Naval pentathlon									●	●	4	2		6
Open water swimming									2		2		1	5
Orienteering						2	2		4					8
Parachuting				●	●	●	1	2	6	5	4			18
Sailing						●	●	2						2
Shooting					1	2	7	3	2	4	6			25
Swimming					9	8	9	9	7					42
Table tennis					●	●	1	●	1	2	●	2		6
Taekwondo									4	4	4	4		16
Triathlon													5	5
Volleyball	Beach volleyball				●	●	●	●	●	●	●	2		4
Volleyball	Indoor volleyball	●	●			●	●	1	●	●	●	1		4
Wrestling							4	5	5	4				18
Daily medal events					22	29	36	42	51	46	37	40	13	316
Cumulative total					22	51	87	129	180	226	263	303	316	316
Para archery						●	●		1	2				3
Para athletics								10	6	8	5			29
Gymnastics							1		1		3	3		8
Tennis								●	●	●	1	4		5
Senior triathlon													3	3
October		16th Wed	17th Thu	18th Fri	19th Sat	20th Sun	21st Mon	22nd Tue	23rd Wed	24th Thu	25th Fri	26th Sat	27th Sun	Events

== Medal table ==
* Host nation (China)

Rank	Nation	Gold	Silver	Bronze	Total
1	China (CHN)*	133	64	42	239
2	Russia (RUS)	51	53	57	161
3	Brazil (BRA)	21	31	36	88
4	France (FRA)	13	20	24	57
5	Poland (POL)	11	15	34	60
6	Germany (GER)	10	15	20	45
7	North Korea (PRK)	9	8	15	32
8	Bahrain (BHR)	9	1	7	17
9	Uzbekistan (UZB)	8	7	5	20
10	Ukraine (UKR)	5	13	15	33
11	Italy (ITA)	4	12	12	28
12	Kazakhstan (KAZ)	4	3	5	12
13	Belarus (BLR)	4	2	8	14
14	Iran (IRI)	4	2	5	11
15	Switzerland (SUI)	4	1	8	13
16	South Korea (KOR)	3	10	11	24
17	Norway (NOR)	2	4	2	8
17	Slovenia (SLO)	2	4	2	8
19	Egypt (EGY)	2	2	5	9
20	Kenya (KEN)	2	1	2	5
20	Morocco (MAR)	2	1	2	5
22	Turkey (TUR)	2	0	3	5
23	Romania (ROU)	1	4	3	8
24	Mongolia (MGL)	1	3	5	9
25	Hungary (HUN)	1	3	1	5
26	Czech Republic (CZE)	1	2	5	8
27	India (IND)	1	1	2	4
28	Belgium (BEL)	1	1	1	3
29	Latvia (LAT)	1	1	0	2
30	Lithuania (LTU)	1	0	1	2
31	Bulgaria (BUL)	1	0	0	1
31	Namibia (NAM)	1	0	0	1
31	Tunisia (TUN)	1	0	0	1
34	Finland (FIN)	0	4	2	6
35	United States (USA)	0	3	5	8
36	Austria (AUT)	0	3	1	4
37	Algeria (ALG)	0	2	5	7
38	Azerbaijan (AZE)	0	2	4	6
39	Dominican Republic (DOM)	0	2	3	5
40	Slovakia (SVK)	0	2	1	3
41	Qatar (QAT)	0	2	0	2
42	Thailand (THA)	0	1	5	6
43	Canada (CAN)	0	1	2	3
43	Sri Lanka (SRI)	0	1	2	3
43	Sweden (SWE)	0	1	2	3
46	Oman (OMA)	0	1	1	2
46	Syria (SYR)	0	1	1	2
46	Vietnam (VIE)	0	1	1	2
49	Denmark (DEN)	0	1	0	1
49	Ecuador (ECU)	0	1	0	1
49	Estonia (EST)	0	1	0	1
49	Saudi Arabia (KSA)	0	1	0	1
49	Tanzania (TAN)	0	1	0	1
54	Serbia (SRB)	0	0	3	3
55	Venezuela (VEN)	0	0	2	2
56	Albania (ALB)	0	0	1	1
56	Armenia (ARM)	0	0	1	1
56	Barbados (BAR)	0	0	1	1
56	Greece (GRE)	0	0	1	1
56	Indonesia (INA)	0	0	1	1
56	Ireland (IRL)	0	0	1	1
56	Kuwait (KUW)	0	0	1	1
56	Luxembourg (LUX)	0	0	1	1
56	Pakistan (PAK)	0	0	1	1
56	Rwanda (RWA)	0	0	1	1
56	Spain (ESP)	0	0	1	1
Totals (66 entries)		316	316	389	1,021

Note: Para Athletics, Para Archery, Gymnastics, Tennis and three Senior Triathlon events not counted in medal table. (Note: The United States won a gold medal in the women's senior division triathlon and a silver medal in the mixed senior team. Since the two triathlon medals were awarded in the over 40 division, they were not counted in the official medal tally.)

== Results ==
- https://web.archive.org/web/20191112134942/https://results.wuhan2019mwg.cn/file/RESULTS-7th%20CISM%20Military%20World%20Games-%E6%80%BB%E6%88%90%E7%BB%A9%E5%86%8C.pdf
- https://web.archive.org/web/20191028234735/https://results.wuhan2019mwg.cn/index.htm#/totalmedal
- https://web.archive.org/web/20191112134942/https://results.wuhan2019mwg.cn/file/RESULTS-7th%20CISM%20Military%20World%20Games-%E6%80%BB%E6%88%90%E7%BB%A9%E5%86%8C.pdf
- https://web.archive.org/web/20191112135029/https://results.wuhan2019mwg.cn/index.htm#/index
- https://web.archive.org/web/20191112135047/http://web.archive.org/screenshot/https://results.wuhan2019mwg.cn/index.htm
- Results book (Track & Field)
- Results book (Marathon)
- Swimming Results book
- Orienteering Results book
- Fencing Results book
