= 2012 in golf =

This article summarizes the highlights of professional and amateur golf in the year 2012.

== Men's professional golf ==
Major championships

- 5–8 April: The Masters – American Bubba Watson defeated South African Louis Oosthuizen on the second hole of a sudden-death playoff to earn his first major championship.
- 14–17 June: U.S. Open – American Webb Simpson won by one stroke over Graeme McDowell and Michael Thompson.
- 19–22 July: The Open Championship – South African Ernie Els won his fourth major by one stroke over Australian Adam Scott.
- 9–12 August: PGA Championship – Northern Ireland's Rory McIlroy won his second major, at the age of 23. His eight-shot win over England's David Lynn was the largest victory margin in the championship's stroke-play era. McIlroy also returned to number 1 in the Official World Golf Ranking.

World Golf Championships

- 22–26 February: WGC-Accenture Match Play Championship – American Hunter Mahan won his second WGC tournament, beating Rory McIlroy 2&1. McIlroy would have risen to number 1 in the Official World Golf Ranking if he had won.
- 8–11 March WGC-Cadillac Championship – England's Justin Rose won his first WGC tournament by one stroke over American Bubba Watson.
- 2–5 August: WGC-Bridgestone Invitational – American Keegan Bradley won by one stroke over compatriots Jim Furyk and Steve Stricker.
- 1–4 November: WGC-HSBC Champions – England's Ian Poulter won his second career WGC by two strokes over four others.

FedEx Cup playoff events - see 2012 FedEx Cup Playoffs

- 23–26 August: The Barclays – American Nick Watney won by three shots over countryman Brandt Snedeker.
- 31 August – 3 September: Deutsche Bank Championship – Rory McIlroy won by one shot over Louis Oosthuizen.
- 6–9 September: BMW Championship – McIlroy won by two shots over Phil Mickelson and Lee Westwood.
- 20–23 September: Tour Championship – American Brandt Snedeker won the tournament (and the FedEx Cup) by three shots over Justin Rose.

Other leading PGA Tour events

- 10–13 May: The Players Championship – American Matt Kuchar won by two strokes over four others.

For a complete list of PGA Tour results see 2012 PGA Tour.

Leading European Tour events

- 24–27 May: BMW PGA Championship – Englishman Luke Donald won for the second straight year and again became the World Ranking Number 1.
- 22–25 November: DP World Tour Championship, Dubai – World #1 Rory McIlroy won his 5th European Tour title by two strokes, tying the tournament record of –23 set by Lee Westwood in 2009.

For a complete list of European Tour results see 2012 European Tour.

Team events

- 28–30 September: Ryder Cup – Team Europe retained the Cup, 14½–13½, after having been down 10–6 to Team USA after Saturday play. This equaled the previous record for the largest final-day comeback in Ryder Cup history, when Team USA came back from the same deficit in 1999.
- 14–16 December: Royal Trophy – Asia won on the first hole of a sudden-death playoff after match with Europe ended in an 8–8 tie.

Tour leaders

- PGA Tour – (Northern Ireland) Rory McIlroy (US$8,047,952)
  - This total does not include FedEx Cup bonuses.
- European Tour – (Northern Ireland) Rory McIlroy (€5,519,118)
  - This total includes the US$1.0 million (€781,091) bonus for winning the Race to Dubai.
- Japan Golf Tour – Hiroyuki Fujita (¥175,159,972)
- Asian Tour – (Thailand) Thaworn Wiratchant (US$738,047)
- PGA Tour of Australasia – (Australia) Peter Senior (A$268,292)
- Sunshine Tour – (South Africa) Branden Grace (R2,760,319)
- OneAsia Tour – (South Korea) Kim Bi-o (US$380,745)
- Tour de las Américas – (Paraguay) Marco Ruiz (26,884 points)
- PGA Tour Latinoamérica – (Argentina) Ariel Cañete (US$91,396)

Awards

- PGA Tour
  - FedEx Cup – Brandt Snedeker won the FedEx Cup after winning the Tour Championship.
  - PGA Player of the Year – (Northern Ireland) Rory McIlroy
  - Player of the Year (Jack Nicklaus Trophy) – (Northern Ireland) Rory McIlroy
  - Leading money winner (Arnold Palmer Award) – (Northern Ireland) Rory McIlroy (US$8,047,952)
  - Vardon Trophy – (Northern Ireland) Rory McIlroy
  - Byron Nelson Award – (Northern Ireland) Rory McIlroy
  - Rookie of the Year – (United States) John Huh
  - Comeback Player of the Year – None
  - Payne Stewart Award – (United States) Steve Stricker
- European Tour
  - Golfer of the Year – (Northern Ireland) Rory McIlroy
  - Rookie of the Year – (Portugal) Ricardo Santos
- Web.com Tour
  - Player of the Year – (United States) Casey Wittenberg

Other tour results

- 2012 Asian Tour
- 2012 PGA Tour of Australasia
- 2012 Canadian Tour
- 2012 Challenge Tour
- 2012 Japan Golf Tour
- 2012 Web.com Tour
- 2012 OneAsia Tour
- 2012 Sunshine Tour
- 2012 Tour de las Américas
- 2012 PGA Tour Latinoamérica

Other happenings

- 4 March – Rory McIlroy became number one in the Official World Golf Ranking after winning The Honda Classic.
- 18 March – Luke Donald re-took the number one spot after winning the Transitions Championship.
- 20 March – The PGA Tour announced changes to its season structure and qualifying to take effect in 2013. Among the changes, as announced at that time:
  - The 2013 season will be the last to be conducted completely within a calendar year. The 2014 season will begin in October 2013, shortly after The Tour Championship, and all future seasons will begin in October of the previous calendar year.
  - The 2012 PGA Tour Qualifying Tournament, also known as "Q-School", will be the last to award playing privileges on the PGA Tour. Beginning in 2013, Q-School will only grant privileges on the Web.com Tour (known at the time as the Nationwide Tour).
  - Starting in 2013, PGA Tour cards for the following season will be awarded at the end of a three-tournament series featuring the top 75 money winners on the Web.com Tour and the golfers finishing between 126 and 200 on the PGA Tour money list.
- 15 April – McIlroy returns to the number one spot in the world rankings.
- 29 April – Donald returns to the number one spot in the world rankings.
- 6 May – McIlroy returns to the number one spot in the world rankings.
- 27 May – Donald returns to the number one spot in the world rankings.
- 26 June – The PGA Tour announces further details regarding its recently announced major schedule changes. Starting in fall 2013, the tournaments in the Fall Series, which will become the season-opening events at that time, will become FedEx Cup events, with full Cup points, for the first time.
- 28 June – The PGA Tour's developmental tour, the Nationwide Tour, was renamed mid-season as the Web.com Tour, after a new sponsorship deal was announced.
- 10 July – The PGA Tour announces final details of its major schedule changes.
  - In a change from the original announcement in March, the money list will no longer determine which PGA Tour members retain their cards. Starting with the 2013 season, the top 125 golfers in FedEx Cup points will retain their cards.
  - The three-tournament series that will award new PGA Tour cards will be called the Web.com Tour Finals. The top 75 players on the Web.com Tour regular-season money list, plus the golfers between 126 and 200 in FedEx Cup points, will be eligible to play.
  - The top 25 on the Web.com Tour regular-season money list will receive PGA Tour cards regardless of their performance in the Web.com Tour Finals. The total money earned in the Finals will determine the remaining 25 card earners. For all 50 new card earners, their positions on the PGA Tour's priority order for purposes of tournament entry will be based on money earned in the Finals.
- 12 August – McIlroy returns to the number one spot in the world rankings by winning the PGA Championship.
- 5 September – The first tournament of PGA Tour Latinoamérica is played, replacing the Tour de las Américas as the primary tour in Latin America.
- 11 September – The PGA Tour announces that for the 2013 season only, due to the transition to a wraparound season, golfers who finish in the top 125 of either the FedEx Cup points list or the season money list will retain their tour cards for the 2014 season.
- 18 October – The PGA Tour and the Canadian Professional Golf Tour jointly announce an agreement by which the PGA Tour would take over the Canadian circuit, effective 1 November. At that time, the Canadian Tour would be officially renamed as PGA Tour Canada.
- 18 November – Miguel Ángel Jiménez becomes the oldest golfer ever to win a European Tour event, winning the UBS Hong Kong Open at age 48 years, 318 days.

== Women's professional golf ==
LPGA majors

- 29 March – 1 April: Kraft Nabisco Championship – South Korea's Sun-Young Yoo defeated fellow Korean I.K. Kim on the first hole of a sudden-death playoff to earn her first major championship. Kim had missed a tap-in on the 72nd hole that would have given her the title.
- 7–10 June: Wegmans LPGA Championship – China's Shanshan Feng won by two strokes over four other golfers. She became the first major winner from China.
- 5–8 July: U.S. Women's Open – Na Yeon Choi of South Korea won her first major championship by a four-stroke margin over fellow Korean Amy Yang.
- 13–16 September: Women's British Open – South Korea's Jiyai Shin won her second Open, also her second major, by a tournament-record nine shots over fellow Korean Inbee Park.

Ladies European Tour major (in addition to the Women's British Open)

- 26–29 July: Evian Masters – South Korean Inbee Park won her second LPGA title by two strokes over Karrie Webb and Stacy Lewis.

For a complete list of Ladies European Tour results see 2012 Ladies European Tour.

Additional LPGA Tour events

- 15–18 November: CME Group Titleholders – South Korean Na Yeon Choi claimed her seventh career LPGA title by two shots over fellow Korean So Yeon Ryu.

For a complete list of LPGA Tour results, see 2012 LPGA Tour.

Team events

Money list leaders

- LPGA Tour – (South Korea) Inbee Park (US$2,266,638)
- LPGA of Japan Tour – (South Korea) Jeon Mi-jeong (¥131,827,582)
- Ladies European Tour – (Spain) Carlota Ciganda (€251,290)
- LPGA of Korea Tour – (South Korea) Kim Ha-Neul (₩458,898,803)
- Ladies Asian Golf Tour – (Thailand) Patcharachuta Kongkapan (US$87,966)
- ALPG Tour – (Australia) Lindsey Wright (A$70,067) (2011/12 season)
- Symetra Tour – (United States) Esther Choe (US$55,690)

Awards

- LPGA Tour Player of the Year – (United States) Stacy Lewis
  - Lewis becomes the first American to claim the award since Beth Daniel in 1994.
- LPGA Tour Rookie of the Year – (South Korea) So Yeon Ryu
- LPGA Tour Vare Trophy – (South Korea) Inbee Park
- LET Player of the Year – (Spain) Carlota Ciganda
- LET Rookie of the Year – (Spain) Carlota Ciganda
- LPGA of Japan Tour Player of the Year – (South Korea) Jeon Mi-jeong

Other tour results

- 2012 Symetra Tour
- 2012 Ladies Asian Golf Tour
- 2012 LPGA of Japan Tour
- 2012 LPGA of Korea Tour

Other happenings

- 29 January – Lydia Ko, a 14-year-old New Zealand amateur, won the Bing Lee Samsung Women's NSW Open on the ALPG Tour, becoming the youngest player of either ***to win a professional tour event.
- 13 June – Brooke Henderson, a 14-year-old Canadian amateur, won the second stop on the Canadian Women's Tour, breaking Ko's previous record as the youngest person ever to win a professional tour event.
- 26 August – Ko, now 15, won the CN Canadian Women's Open, becoming the youngest player ever to win an LPGA Tour event and the first amateur to win on that tour since JoAnne Carner in 1969.
- 10 September – Jiyai Shin defeated Paula Creamer on the ninth hole of a sudden-death playoff, the longest between two players in LPGA history, to win the Kingsmill Championship. The playoff was suspended due to darkness after eight holes on Sunday evening, and resumed the following day.

== Senior men's professional golf ==
Senior majors

- 24–27 May: Senior Players Championship – England's Roger Chapman won his first senior major by two strokes over American John Cook.
- 7–10 June: Regions Tradition – American Tom Lehman won his second straight Tradition, and third senior major, by two strokes over Germany's Bernhard Langer and Taiwan's Lu Chien-soon.
- 28 June – 1 July: Senior PGA Championship – American Joe Daley won his first Champions Tour event by two strokes over Tom Lehman.
- 12–15 July: U.S. Senior Open – England's Roger Chapman won his second senior major of the year.
- 26–29 July: The Senior Open Championship – American Fred Couples won his second senior major by two strokes over Gary Hallberg.

Full results

- 2012 Champions Tour
- 2012 European Senior Tour

Money list leaders

- Champions Tour – German Bernhard Langer topped the money list for the fourth time with earnings of US$2,140,296.
- European Senior Tour – Englishman Roger Chapman topped the money list for the first time with earnings of €356,751.

Awards

- Champions Tour
  - Charles Schwab Cup – (United States) Tom Lehman
  - Player of the Year – (United States) Tom Lehman
  - Rookie of the Year – (United States) Kirk Triplett
  - Leading money winner (Arnold Palmer Award) – (Germany) Bernhard Langer
  - Lowest stroke average (Byron Nelson Award) – (United States) Fred Couples

== Amateur golf ==
- 22–25 May: NCAA Division I Women's Golf Championships – Alabama won its first team championship and Chirapat Jao-Javanil of Oklahoma won the individual title.
- 29 May – 3 June: NCAA Division I Men's Golf Championships – Texas won its third team championship and Thomas Pieters of Illinois won the individual title.
- 8–10 June: Curtis Cup – Great Britain and Ireland defeated the United States, 10½ to 9½, winning for the first time since 1996.
- 18–23 June: The Amateur Championship – Alan Dunbar of Northern Ireland defeated Matthias Schwab of Austria, 1 up.
- 6–12 August: U.S. Women's Amateur – Lydia Ko of New Zealand beat American Jaye Marie Green, 3 & 1, in the final.
- 13–19 August: U.S. Amateur – American Steven Fox defeated Michael Weaver on the 37th hole.
- 27–30 September Espirito Santo Trophy – South Korea won by three strokes over Germany.
- 4–7 October Eisenhower Trophy – The United States won by five strokes over Mexico. The event was shortened to 54 holes due to rain.
- 1–4 November: Asia-Pacific Amateur Championship – 14-year-old Guan Tianlang of China won by one shot over Pan Cheng-tsung of Taiwan. Guan earned an invitation to the 2013 Masters, and went on to become the youngest golfer ever to compete in that tournament.

Other happenings

== World Golf Hall of Fame inductees ==
The 2012 class was inducted on 7 May:

- (England) Peter Alliss (Lifetime Achievement)
- (United States) Dan Jenkins (Lifetime Achievement)
- (Scotland) Sandy Lyle (International)
- (United States) Phil Mickelson (PGA Tour)
- (United States) Hollis Stacy (Veterans)

The 2013 class was announced starting in September 2012 with induction set for May 2013:

- (United States) Fred Couples (PGA Tour)
- (United States) Ken Venturi (Lifetime Achievement)
- (Scotland) Willie Park, Jr. (Veterans)
- (Scotland) Colin Montgomerie (International)
- (Scotland) Ken Schofield (Lifetime Achievement)

== Deaths ==
- 2 January — Yoshiro Hayashi (born 1922), two-time Japan Open winner
- 24 January — Moira Milton (born 1923), British Ladies Amateur winner
- 10 February — Geoffrey Cornish (born 1914), golf course architect
- 8 March — Mike Fetchick (born 1922), three-time PGA Tour winner
- 20 July — Dorothy Germain Porter (born 1924), 1949 U.S. Women's Amateur winner
- 28 August — Ramón Sota (born 1938), won nine pre-European Tour events
- 26 September — Vance Heafner (born 1954), PGA Tour winner
- 11 October — Bill Ezinicki (born 1924), PGA professional and former professional ice hockey player
- 11 December — Colleen Walker (born 1956), nine-time LPGA Tour winner

== Table of results ==
This table summarizes all the results referred to above in date order.

Dates	Tournament	Status or tour	Winner
22–26 Feb	WGC-Accenture Match Play Championship	World Golf Championships	(United States) Hunter Mahan
8–11 Mar	WGC-Cadillac Championship	World Golf Championships	(England) Justin Rose
29 Mar–1 Apr	Kraft Nabisco Championship	LPGA major	(South Korea) Sun-Young Yoo
5–8 Apr	The Masters	Men's major	(United States) Bubba Watson
10–13 May	The Players Championship	PGA Tour	(United States) Matt Kuchar
22–25 May	NCAA Division I Women's Golf Championships	U.S. college championship	Alabama / Chirapat Jao-Javanil
24–27 May	BMW PGA Championship	European Tour	(England) Luke Donald
24–27 May	Senior PGA Championship	Senior major	(England) Roger Chapman
29 May–3 Jun	NCAA Division I Men's Golf Championships	U.S. college championship	Texas / Thomas Pieters
7–10 Jun	Wegmans LPGA Championship	LPGA major	(China) Shanshan Feng
7–10 Jun	Regions Tradition	Senior major	(United States) Tom Lehman
8–10 Jun	Curtis Cup	Amateur women's team tournament	(United Kingdom) Great Britain & (Republic of Ireland) Ireland
14–17 Jun	U.S. Open	Men's major	(United States) Webb Simpson
18–23 Jun	The Amateur Championship	Amateur men's individual tournament	(Northern Ireland) Alan Dunbar
28 Jun–1 Jul	Constellation Senior Players Championship	Senior major	(United States) Joe Daley
5–8 Jul	U.S. Women's Open	LPGA major	(South Korea) Na Yeon Choi
12–15 Jul	U.S. Senior Open	Senior major	(England) Roger Chapman
19–22 Jul	The Open Championship	Men's major	(South Africa) Ernie Els
26–29 Jul	Evian Masters	Ladies European Tour major and LPGA Tour regular event	(South Korea) Inbee Park
26–29 Jul	The Senior Open Championship	Senior major	(United States) Fred Couples
2–5 Aug	WGC-Bridgestone Invitational	World Golf Championships	(United States) Keegan Bradley
6–12 Aug	U.S. Women's Amateur	Amateur women's individual tournament	(New Zealand) Lydia Ko
9–12 Aug	PGA Championship	Men's major	(Northern Ireland) Rory McIlroy
13–19 Aug	U.S. Amateur	Amateur men's individual tournament	(United States) Steven Fox
23–26 Aug	The Barclays	PGA Tour FedEx Cup playoff	(United States) Nick Watney
31 Aug–3 Sep	Deutsche Bank Championship	PGA Tour FedEx Cup playoff	(Northern Ireland) Rory McIlroy
6–9 Sep	BMW Championship	PGA Tour FedEx Cup playoff	(Northern Ireland) Rory McIlroy
13–16 Sep	Ricoh Women's British Open	LPGA and Ladies European Tour major	(South Korea) Jiyai Shin
20–23 Sep	The Tour Championship	PGA Tour FedEx Cup playoff	(United States) Brandt Snedeker
28–30 Sep	Ryder Cup	Europe v United States men's professional team event	Team Europe
27–30 Sep	Espirito Santo Trophy	Women's amateur team event	South Korea
4–7 Oct	Eisenhower Trophy	Men's amateur team event	United States
1–4 Nov	WGC-HSBC Champions	World Golf Championships	(England) Ian Poulter
1–4 Nov	Asia-Pacific Amateur Championship	Amateur men's individual tournament	(China) Guan Tianlang
15–18 Nov	CME Group Titleholders	LPGA Tour	(South Korea) Na Yeon Choi
22–25 Nov	DP World Tour Championship, Dubai	European Tour	(Northern Ireland) Rory McIlroy
14–16 Dec	Royal Trophy	Europe v Asia men's professional team event	Asia

The following biennial events will next be played in 2013: Solheim Cup, Walker Cup, Presidents Cup, Seve Trophy, World Cup.
