= Chris Williams (American golfer) =

American professional golfer (born 1991)

Personal information
- Nationality: United States
- Born: June 21, 1991 (age 35) Moscow, Idaho, U.S.
- Height: 6 ft 0 in (1.83 m)

Career
- Sport: Golf
- College: University of Washington
- Turned professional: 2013
- Former tours: PGA Tour Canada; PGA Tour Latinoamérica

Best results in major championships
- Masters Tournament: DNP
- PGA Championship: DNP
- U.S. Open: CUT: 2011, 2013
- The Open Championship: DNP

Achievements and awards
- Pac-10 Freshman of the Year: 2010
- Mickelson Award: 2010
- Mark H. McCormack Medal: 2012
- Ben Hogan Award: 2013

Chris Williams (born June 21, 1991) is an American professional golfer noted for his amateur success. He was a member of the U.S. 2011 Walker Cup team, and the victorious U.S. teams at the 2011 Palmer Cup and 2012 Eisenhower Trophy. He was awarded the Mickelson Award, the Mark H. McCormack Medal and the Ben Hogan Award, and was number one ranked amateur golfer in the world for 46 weeks in 2012 and 2013.

== Early life and family ==
Williams grew up in Moscow, Idaho to parents are Linda and Varnel Williams. His two older brothers were also athletes, Jeff played hockey for the University of Idaho and Pete was a professional golfer between 2006 and 2008.

Williams was a four-time Idaho High School 4A state champion and four-time North Idaho Golfer of the Year. In 2007, he was Washington Junior Golf Association State Champion, WJGA Junior Golfer of the Year and WJGA Player of the Year. In 2009, he graduated from Moscow High School and helped his school team win the state championship.

== College career ==
Williams played for the University of Washington between 2009 and 2013 where he was a four-time All-American. He led the Washington Huskies men's golf team in scoring between 2010 and 2013, and won six tournament and recorded 20 top-10 finishes. He finished ninth overall in the NCAA Championship as a freshman, and earned the title of Pac-10 Freshman of the Year. He won the Mickelson Award as the top freshman in the nation, and appeared for the U.S. national team in the 2011 Walker Cup, and in the Palmer Cup twice.

Williams made his major debut at the 2011 U.S. Open at Congressional Country Club after he secured a spot with a win at the sectional qualifying event at Gold Mountain, Washington. He missed the cut by two strokes.

He won the 2012 Eisenhower Trophy, the World Amateur Team Championship, together with Steven Fox and Justin Thomas, recording the second best individual score, one stroke behind Sebastián Vázquez.

As a junior, he reached number one in the World Amateur Golf Ranking, where he stayed for 46 weeks in 2012 and 2013. This achievement gave him the Mark H. McCormack Medal, which earned him entries into the 2013 U.S. Open, where he missed the cut by a stroke, and the 2013 Open Championship, which he forfeited by turning professional after the U.S. Open.

Williams received the Ben Hogan Award as a senior, an honor the NCAA bestows annually to the best college golfer.

== Professional career ==
Williams made his professional debut at the 2013 Travelers Championship, where he finished tied for 30th. He received three further exemptions that season and four more on the 2013–14 PGA Tour, but made just two cuts, ending his chance of making enough money in those events to earn a PGA Tour card.

Williams failed to advance at the Web.com Tour qualifying school six years in a row. He played on the PGA Tour Canada for five seasons between 2014 and 2018, and complemented with starts on the PGA Tour Latinoamérica in 2017 and 2018. He recorded no wins but five top-5 finishes, including a playoff loss. He retired from tour following the 2018 season.

== Coaching career ==
Williams served as assistant coach at Marquette University between 2019 and 2021, and became assistant coach for the Auburn Tigers men's golf team at Auburn University in 2021.

== Amateur wins ==
- 2007 Washington Junior Golf Association (WJGA) State Championship
- 2008 San Diego Junior Amateur Championship
- 2010 Battle at the Beach
- 2011 The Duck Invitational, Sahalee Players Championship, Pacific Coast Amateur, Kikkor Husky Invitational
- 2012 Bandon Dunes Championship, NCAA Southwest Regional, Washington State Amateur, Western Amateur

== Results in major championships ==
Tournament	2011	2012	2013
U.S. Open	CUT		CUT

Did not play

CUT = missed the half-way cut
Note: Williams only played in the U.S. Open.

== U.S. national team appearances ==
- Walker Cup: 2011
- Eisenhower Trophy: 2012 (winners)
- Palmer Cup: 2011 (winners), 2012
