= Golf at the 2019 Military World Games =

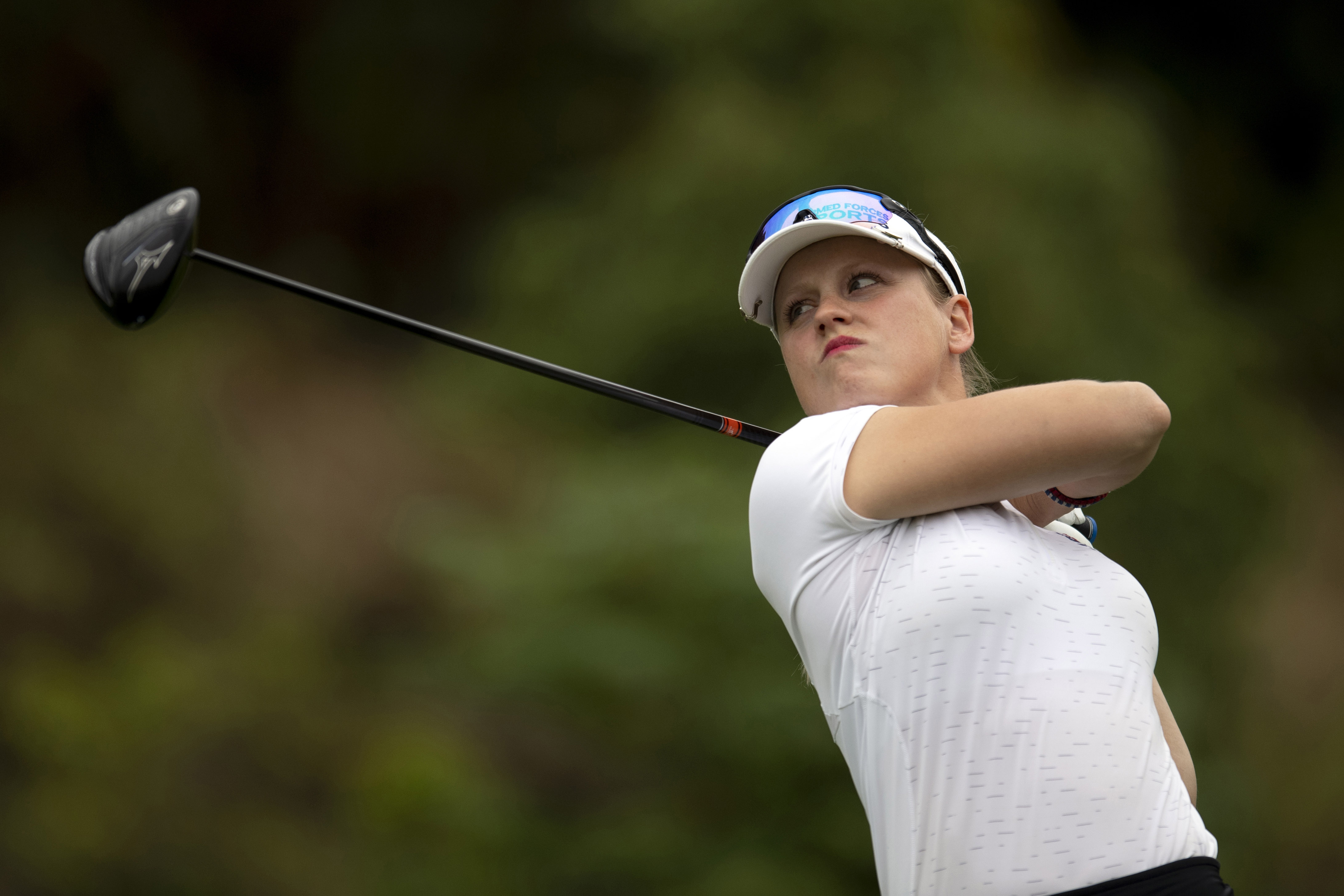
- U.S. Navy Lt. Laurel Gill watches her drive
- Dates: 19–23 October

Golf at the 2019 Military World Games was held in Wuhan, China from 19 to 23 October 2019.

== Medal summary ==
Event	Gold	Silver	Bronze
Men individual	Rodrigo Lee; Brazil	Maxime Radureau; France	Rafael Becker; Brazil
Women individual	Suely Miriam Nagl; Brazil	Josephine Farrando; France	Linda Jeffery; United States
Men team	Brazil; Philippe Gasnier; Rafael Becker; Rodrigo Lee; Andre Tourinho; Daniel Ishii; Gustavo Teodoro	France; Nicolas Calvet; P.E. Cabanne Andre de L'Arc; Mael Tasset; Frederic Alba; Leonard Bem; Maxime Radureau	United States; Brandon Johnson; Justin Broussard; Ian Milne; Andrew Fecteau; Dalton Dishman; Russell Marion
Women team	Brazil; Laura Caetano; Suely Miriam Nagl; Clara Teixeira	United States; Linda Jeffery; Melanie DeLeon; Laurel Gill	France; Marine Riguidel; Anyssia Herbaut; Josephine Farrando
