= Lithuania at the 2019 Military World Games =

- Flag of Lithuania
- IOC code: LTU

in Wuhan, China 18 October 2019 – 27 October 2019
- Medals Ranked 30th: Gold 1 Silver 0 Bronze 1 Total 2

Military World Games appearances
- 1995; 1999; 2003; 2007; 2011; 2015; 2019; 2023

Lithuania competed at the 2019 Military World Games held in Wuhan, China from 18 to 27 October 2019. In total, athletes representing Lithuania won one gold and one bronze medal. The country finished in 30th place in the medal table.

== Medal summary ==
=== Medal by sports ===
Medals by sport
Sport	1st place, gold medalist(s)	2nd place, silver medalist(s)	3rd place, bronze medalist(s)	Total
Basketball	1	0	0	1
Boxing	0	0	1	1

=== Medalists ===
Medal	Name	Sport	Event
Gold	Men's team	Basketball	Men's tournament
Bronze	Algirdas Baniulis	Boxing	Men's +91 kg
