= 2013 Masters Tournament =

American golf tournament held in 2013

- Front cover of the 2013 Masters Journal

Tournament information
- Dates: April 11–14, 2013
- Location: Augusta, Georgia, U.S. 33.503°N 82.020°W
- Course: Augusta National Golf Club
- Organized by: Augusta National Golf Club
- Tours: PGA Tour; European Tour; Japan Golf Tour

Statistics
- Par: 72
- Length: 7,435 yards (6,799 m)
- Field: 93 players, 61 after cut
- Cut: 148 (+4)
- Prize fund: US$8,000,000
- Winner's share: $1,440,000

Champion
- (Australia) Adam Scott
- 279 (−9), playoff
- Location in the United States Location in Georgia

The 2013 Masters Tournament was the 77th edition of the Masters Tournament and the first of golf's four major championships to be held in 2013. It was held from April 11–14 at Augusta National Golf Club in Augusta, Georgia. Adam Scott won the tournament on the second hole of a sudden death playoff against Ángel Cabrera. It was Scott's first major championship and the first time an Australian won the Masters.

== Course ==
Hole	Name	Yards	Par	Hole	Name	Yards	Par
1	Tea Olive	445	4	10	Camellia	495	4
2	Pink Dogwood	575	5	11	White Dogwood	505	4
3	Flowering Peach	350	4	12	Golden Bell	155	3
4	Flowering Crab Apple	240	3	13	Azalea	510	5
5	Magnolia	455	4	14	Chinese Fir	440	4
6	Juniper	180	3	15	Firethorn	530	5
7	Pampas	450	4	16	Redbud	170	3
8	Yellow Jasmine	570	5	17	Nandina	440	4
9	Carolina Cherry	460	4	18	Holly	465	4
Out		3,725	36	In		3,710	36
Source:				Total		7,435	72

== Field ==
The Masters has the smallest field of the four major championships. Officially, the Masters remains an invitation event, but there is a set of qualifying criteria that determines who is included in the field. Each player is classified according to the first category by which he qualified, with other categories in which he qualified shown in parentheses.

Golfers who qualify based solely on their performance in amateur tournaments (categories 6–10) must remain amateurs on the starting day of the tournament to be eligible to play.

Four players were appearing in their first major: Steven Fox, Michael Weaver, Guan Tianlang and T. J. Vogel. Thirteen others were appearing in their first Masters: Alan Dunbar, John Peterson, David Lynn, John Huh, Scott Piercy, Russell Henley, Ted Potter Jr., George Coetzee, Nicolas Colsaerts, Jamie Donaldson, Branden Grace, Thorbjørn Olesen, Thaworn Wiratchant.

1. Past Masters Champions

- Ángel Cabrera
- Fred Couples (11)
- Ben Crenshaw
- Trevor Immelman
- Zach Johnson (15,16,17,18,19)
- Bernhard Langer
- Sandy Lyle
- Phil Mickelson (11,15,16,17,18,19)
- Larry Mize
- José María Olazábal
- Mark O'Meara
- Charl Schwartzel (18,19)
- Vijay Singh
- Craig Stadler
- Bubba Watson (11,15,17,18,19)
- Tom Watson
- Mike Weir
- Tiger Woods (2,13,15,16,17,18,19)
- Ian Woosnam
- Past champions who did not play: Tommy Aaron, Jack Burke Jr., Billy Casper, Charles Coody, Nick Faldo, Raymond Floyd, Doug Ford, Bob Goalby, Jack Nicklaus, Arnold Palmer, Gary Player, Fuzzy Zoeller. Nicklaus, Palmer, and Player served as "honorary starters" and teed off on the first day at the first hole to kick off the tournament.

2. Last five U.S. Open Champions

- Lucas Glover
- Graeme McDowell (11,12,18,19)
- Rory McIlroy (4,14,15,16,17,18,19)
- Webb Simpson (12,15,17,18,19)

3. Last five British Open Champions

- Stewart Cink
- Ernie Els (13,15,17,18,19)
- Pádraig Harrington (4,11,12)
- Louis Oosthuizen (11,15,17,18,19)
- Darren Clarke did not play due to a hamstring injury.

4. Last five PGA Champions

- Keegan Bradley (14,15,16,17,18,19)
- Martin Kaymer (18,19)
- Yang Yong-eun

5. Last three winners of The Players Championship

- K. J. Choi (18)
- Tim Clark
- Matt Kuchar (11,15,16,17,18,19)

6. Top two finishers in the 2012 U.S. Amateur

- Steven Fox (a)
- Michael Weaver (a)

7. Winner of the 2012 Amateur Championship

- Alan Dunbar (a)

8. Winner of the 2012 Asia-Pacific Amateur Championship

- Guan Tianlang (a)

9. Winner of the 2012 U.S. Amateur Public Links

- T. J. Vogel (a)

10. Winner of the 2012 U.S. Mid-Amateur

- Nathan Smith (a)

11. The top 16 finishers and ties in the 2012 Masters Tournament

- Jim Furyk (12,15,17,18,19)
- Sergio García (15,16,17,18,19)
- Peter Hanson (18,19)
- Hunter Mahan (15,17,18,19)
- Kevin Na
- Ian Poulter (14,18,19)
- Justin Rose (14,15,17,18,19)
- Adam Scott (13,15,17,18,19)
- Lee Westwood (15,17,18,19)

12. Top 8 finishers and ties in the 2012 U.S. Open

- Jason Dufner (15,16,17,18,19)
- John Peterson
- Michael Thompson (16,19)
- David Toms (18)

13. Top 4 finishers and ties in the 2012 British Open Championship

- Brandt Snedeker (15,16,17,18,19)

14. Top 4 finishers and ties in the 2012 PGA Championship

- David Lynn (18)
- Carl Pettersson (15,16,17,18,19)

15. Top 30 leaders on the 2012 PGA Tour official money earnings list

- Ben Curtis (16)
- Luke Donald (17,18,19)
- Rickie Fowler (16,17,18,19)
- Robert Garrigus (17,18,19)
- John Huh (17)
- Dustin Johnson (16,17,18,19)
- Ryan Moore (17,18,19)
- Scott Piercy (16,17,18,19)
- Steve Stricker (17,18,19)
- Bo Van Pelt (17,18,19)
- Nick Watney (16,17,18,19)

16. Winners of PGA Tour events that award a full-point allocation for the season-ending Tour Championship, between the 2012 Masters Tournament and the 2013 Masters Tournament

- Brian Gay
- Russell Henley (19)
- Martin Laird
- Marc Leishman
- John Merrick
- D. A. Points
- Ted Potter Jr.
- Kevin Streelman

17. All players qualifying for the 2012 edition of The Tour Championship

- John Senden (18,19)

18. Top 50 on the final 2012 Official World Golf Ranking list

- Thomas Bjørn
- George Coetzee (19)
- Nicolas Colsaerts (19)
- Jason Day (19)
- Jamie Donaldson (19)
- Gonzalo Fernández-Castaño (19)
- Hiroyuki Fujita
- Branden Grace (19)
- Bill Haas (19)
- Paul Lawrie (19)
- Matteo Manassero (19)
- Francesco Molinari (19)
- Thorbjørn Olesen (19)

19. Top 50 on the Official World Golf Ranking list on March 31, 2013

- Freddie Jacobson
- Henrik Stenson
- Richard Sterne

20. International invitees

- Ryo Ishikawa
- Thaworn Wiratchant

== Round summaries ==
=== First round ===
Thursday, April 11, 2013

Place	Player	Score	To par
T1	(Spain) Sergio García	66	−6
T1	(Australia) Marc Leishman	66	−6
3	(United States) Dustin Johnson	67	−5
T4	(United States) Fred Couples	68	−4
T4	(Spain) Gonzalo Fernández-Castaño	68	−4
T4	(United States) Rickie Fowler	68	−4
T4	(South Africa) Trevor Immelman	68	−4
T4	(United States) Matt Kuchar	68	−4
T4	(England) David Lynn	68	−4
T10	(United States) Jim Furyk	69	−3
T10	(United States) Zach Johnson	69	−3
T10	(Australia) Adam Scott	69	−3

=== Second round ===
Friday, April 12, 2013

For 2013 the minimum number of players making the cut was increased from 44 to 50 (plus ties). As previously, all players within 10 shots of the leader also make the cut. 61 players made the cut, all those within 10 shots of the leader. Fourteen-year-old Guan Tianlang, playing in his first Masters, was the only amateur player to make the cut, despite being penalized a stroke for slow play.

Place	Player	Score	To par
1	(Australia) Jason Day	70-68=138	−6
T2	(United States) Fred Couples	68-71=139	−5
T2	(Australia) Marc Leishman	66-73=139	−5
T4	(Argentina) Ángel Cabrera	71-69=140	−4
T4	(United States) Jim Furyk	69-71=140	−4
T4	(United States) Brandt Snedeker	70-70=140	−4
T7	(South Korea) K. J. Choi	70-71=141	−3
T7	(United States) Jason Dufner	72-69=141	−3
T7	(England) David Lynn	68-73=141	−3
T7	(England) Justin Rose	70-71=141	−3
T7	(Australia) Adam Scott	69-72=141	−3
T7	(England) Lee Westwood	70-71=141	−3

Amateurs: Guan (+4), Vogel (+8), Weaver (+8), Smith (+11), Fox (+13), Dunbar (+16).
Note: Tiger Woods originally signed for a 71 which gave him 70-71=141 (−3). However, his second-round score was adjusted on Saturday morning to a 73 (see below).

=== Third round ===
Saturday, April 13, 2013

Prior to the third round, a controversy concerning Tiger Woods developed. After Friday's second round, Woods signed for a score of 71 (−1), which included a bogey at the par-5 15th hole. Woods' third shot had hit the pin and rebounded into the water hazard. He took a penalty stroke and appeared to take his drop at the same position from which he had played his third shot. In an interview following the round Woods stated that he had actually dropped the ball two yards further back from the pin than the original position. Based upon hearing the interview, tournament officials met with Woods Saturday morning and deemed the drop to have been in contravention of the rules. This could have meant disqualification, but instead Woods was assessed a two-stroke penalty for the illegal drop. He therefore scored a triple-bogey 8 at the 15th and had an adjusted second round score of 73 (+1).

Place	Player	Score	To par
T1	(Argentina) Ángel Cabrera	71-69-69=209	−7
T1	(United States) Brandt Snedeker	70-70-69=209	−7
3	(Australia) Adam Scott	69-72-69=210	−6
T4	(Australia) Jason Day	70-68-73=211	−5
T4	(Australia) Marc Leishman	66-73-72=211	−5
6	(United States) Matt Kuchar	68-75-69=212	−4
T7	(South Africa) Tim Clark	70-76-67=213	−3
T7	(United States) Tiger Woods	70-73-70=213	−3
T9	(United States) Rickie Fowler	68-76-70=214	−2
T9	(United States) Jim Furyk	69-71-74=214	−2
T9	(Germany) Bernhard Langer	71-71-72=214	−2
T9	(United States) Steve Stricker	73-70-71=214	−2
T9	(England) Lee Westwood	70-71-73=214	−2

=== Final round ===
Sunday, April 14, 2013

==== Summary ====
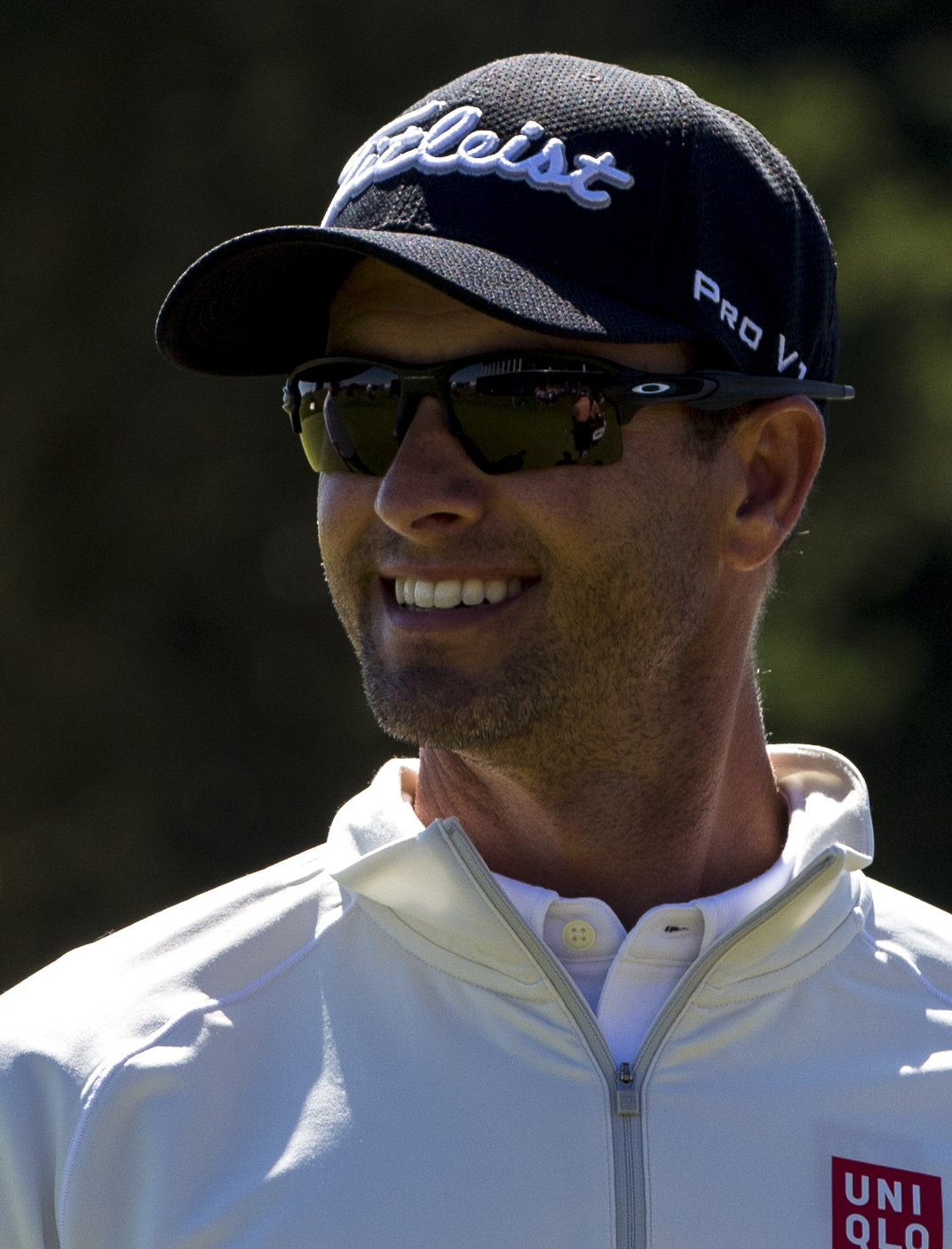
Adam Scott won his first Masters title

External videos
- Full final round coverage on CBS on YouTube

In the final round, played in a cold and steady rain, third round co-leader Brandt Snedeker fell out of contention with a 75. Jason Day had the lead with three holes to go but bogeyed the 16th and 17th holes to finish in third place at 281 (−7). Adam Scott and Ángel Cabrera both birdied the 72nd hole to finish tied for the lead at 279 (−9). Playing in the group ahead of the final twosome, Scott rolled in a 25-footer (8 m). Minutes later Cabrera matched Scott's birdie when he hit his approach shot to 3 feet (1 m) and made the putt to force a playoff.

The sudden-death playoff began at the 18th hole, where Scott and Cabrera both scrambled for par from just short of the green after their approach shots each landed on the front section of the green and backed just off the fringe, with Cabrera's chip nearly holing out. At the next hole, #10, both were in the fairway then on the green in regulation. Cabrera's lengthy putt just missed and he tapped in for par. With the opportunity to win and in fading light, Scott sank his 15-foot (4.6 m) birdie putt for the victory. It was Scott's first major championship and the only time an Australian has won the Masters, after producing nine runners-up in the tournament. Following his victory, he paid tribute to Greg Norman: "It was one guy who inspired a nation of golfers, and that is Greg Norman". Earlier that day, Norman said that if an Australian won the title "it would mean everything to [him]".

==== Final leaderboard ====
Champion
Silver Cup winner (low amateur)
(a) = amateur
(c) = past champion

Top 10
Place	Player	Score	To par	Money (US$)
T1	(Argentina) Ángel Cabrera (c)	71-69-69-70=279	−9	Playoff
T1	(Australia) Adam Scott	69-72-69-69=279	−9	Playoff
3	(Australia) Jason Day	70-68-73-70=281	−7	544,000
T4	(Australia) Marc Leishman	66-73-72-72=283	−5	352,000
T4	(United States) Tiger Woods (c)	70-73-70-70=283	−5	352,000
T6	(Denmark) Thorbjørn Olesen	78-70-68-68=284	−4	278,000
T6	(United States) Brandt Snedeker	70-70-69-75=284	−4	278,000
T8	(Spain) Sergio García	66-76-73-70=285	−3	232,000
T8	(United States) Matt Kuchar	68-75-69-73=285	−3	232,000
T8	(England) Lee Westwood	70-71-73-71=285	−3	232,000

Leaderboard below the top 10
Place	Player	Score	To par	Money ($)
T11	(South Africa) Tim Clark	70-76-67-73=286	−2	192,000
T11	(United States) John Huh	70-77-71-68=286	−2	192,000
T13	(United States) Fred Couples (c)	68-71-77-71=287	−1	145,600
T13	(South Africa) Ernie Els	71-74-73-69=287	−1	145,600
T13	(United States) Dustin Johnson	67-76-74-70=287	−1	145,600
T13	(United States) David Toms	70-74-76-67=287	−1	145,600
T13	(United States) Nick Watney	78-69-68-72=287	−1	145,600
T18	(South Africa) Branden Grace	78-70-71-69=288	E	116,000
T18	(Sweden) Henrik Stenson	75-71-73-69=288	E	116,000
T20	(United States) Jason Dufner	72-69-75-73=289	+1	89,920
T20	(Spain) Gonzalo Fernández-Castaño	68-74-73-74=289	+1	89,920
T20	(United States) Bill Haas	71-72-74-72=289	+1	89,920
T20	(United States) Steve Stricker	73-70-71-75=289	+1	89,920
T20	(United States) Bo Van Pelt	71-74-70-74=289	+1	89,920
T25	(United States) Stewart Cink	75-71-73-71=290	+2	56,040
T25	(England) Luke Donald	71-72-75-72=290	+2	56,040
T25	(United States) Jim Furyk	69-71-74-76=290	+2	56,040
T25	(Sweden) Freddie Jacobson	72-73-72-73=290	+2	56,040
T25	(Germany) Bernhard Langer (c)	71-71-72-76=290	+2	56,040
T25	(Northern Ireland) Rory McIlroy	72-70-79-69=290	+2	56,040
T25	(England) Justin Rose	70-71-75-74=290	+2	56,040
T25	(South Africa) Charl Schwartzel (c)	71-71-75-73=290	+2	56,040
T25	(South Africa) Richard Sterne	73-72-75-70=290	+2	56,040
T25	(United States) Michael Thompson	73-71-79-67=290	+2	56,040
T35	(United States) Zach Johnson (c)	69-76-71-75=291	+3	41,200
T35	(Germany) Martin Kaymer	72-75-74-70=291	+3	41,200
T35	(Australia) John Senden	72-70-75-74=291	+3	41,200
T38	(United States) Rickie Fowler	68-76-70-78=292	+4	32,000
T38	(United States) Robert Garrigus	76-71-72-73=292	+4	32,000
T38	(United States) Brian Gay	72-74-74-72=292	+4	32,000
T38	(Japan) Ryo Ishikawa	71-77-76-68=292	+4	32,000
T38	(Scotland) Paul Lawrie	76-70-75-71=292	+4	32,000
T38	(United States) Ryan Moore	71-72-81-68=292	+4	32,000
T38	(United States) D. A. Points	72-75-72-73=292	+4	32,000
T38	(Fiji) Vijay Singh (c)	72-74-74-72=292	+4	32,000
T46	(Denmark) Thomas Bjørn	73-73-76-71=293	+5	23,307
T46	(South Korea) K. J. Choi	70-71-77-75=293	+5	23,307
T46	(England) David Lynn	68-73-80-72=293	+5	23,307
49	(United States) Lucas Glover	74-74-73-73=294	+6	20,800
T50	(Sweden) Peter Hanson	72-75-76-72=295	+7	19,480
T50	(South Africa) Trevor Immelman (c)	68-75-78-74=295	+7	19,480
T50	(Spain) José María Olazábal (c)	74-72-74-75=295	+7	19,480
T50	(United States) Bubba Watson (c)	75-73-70-77=295	+7	19,480
T54	(United States) Keegan Bradley	73-73-82-69=297	+9	18,320
T54	(Scotland) Sandy Lyle (c)	73-72-81-71=297	+9	18,320
T54	(United States) Phil Mickelson (c)	71-76-77-73=297	+9	18,320
T54	(United States) Scott Piercy	75-69-78-75=297	+9	18,320
58	(China) Guan Tianlang (a)	73-75-77-75=300	+12	0
59	(United States) Kevin Na	70-76-74-81=301	+13	17,920
60	(United States) John Peterson	71-77-74-80=302	+14	17,760
61	(Sweden) Carl Pettersson	76-70-77-81=304	+16	17,600
CUT	(South Africa) George Coetzee	75-74=149	+5	
CUT	(Wales) Jamie Donaldson	74-75=149	+5	
CUT	(Scotland) Martin Laird	76-73=149	+5	
CUT	(Italy) Matteo Manassero	75-74=149	+5	
CUT	(Northern Ireland) Graeme McDowell	73-76=149	+5	
CUT	(United States) Larry Mize (c)	73-76=149	+5	
CUT	(United States) Ted Potter Jr.	76-73=149	+5	
CUT	(United States) Webb Simpson	73-76=149	+5	
CUT	(South Korea) Yang Yong-eun	72-77=149	+5	
CUT	(South Africa) Louis Oosthuizen	74-76=150	+6	
CUT	(Belgium) Nicolas Colsaerts	74-77=151	+7	
CUT	(United States) Ben Curtis	76-75=151	+7	
CUT	(United States) John Merrick	74-77=151	+7	
CUT	(United States) Mark O'Meara (c)	74-77=151	+7	
CUT	(England) Ian Poulter	76-75=151	+7	
CUT	(Canada) Mike Weir (c)	72-79=151	+7	
CUT	(United States) T. J. Vogel (a)	77-75=152	+8	
CUT	(United States) Michael Weaver (a)	78-74=152	+8	
CUT	(Thailand) Thaworn Wiratchant	79-73=152	+8	
CUT	(Republic of Ireland) Pádraig Harrington	78-75=153	+9	
CUT	(United States) Russell Henley	72-81=153	+9	
CUT	(United States) Kevin Streelman	76-77=153	+9	
CUT	(Italy) Francesco Molinari	74-81=155	+11	
CUT	(United States) Nathan Smith (a)	77-78=155	+11	
CUT	(United States) Steven Fox (a)	76-81=157	+13	
CUT	(United States) Tom Watson (c)	79-78=157	+13	
CUT	(United States) Hunter Mahan	76-82=158	+14	
CUT	(United States) Craig Stadler (c)	79-79=158	+14	
CUT	(Wales) Ian Woosnam (c)	80-78=158	+14	
CUT	(Northern Ireland) Alan Dunbar (a)	83-77=160	+16	
CUT	(United States) Ben Crenshaw (c)	80-84=164	+20	
CUT	(Japan) Hiroyuki Fujita	79-85=164	+20	

==== Scorecard ====
Hole	1	2	3	4	5	6	7	8	9	10	11	12	13	14	15	16	17	18
Par	4	5	4	3	4	3	4	5	4	4	4	3	5	4	5	3	4	4
(Australia) Scott	−5	−5	−6	−6	−6	−6	−6	−6	−6	−6	−6	−6	−7	−7	−8	−8	−8	−9
(Argentina) Cabrera	−7	−8	−8	−8	−8	−8	−9	−9	−9	−8	−8	−8	−7	−7	−7	−8	−8	−9
(Australia) Day	−6	−8	−8	−8	−8	−7	−7	−7	−6	−6	−6	−6	−7	−8	−9	−8	−7	−7
(Australia) Leishman	−5	−5	−5	−4	−4	−4	−4	−4	−5	−5	−6	−6	−6	−6	−5	−5	−5	−5
(United States) Woods	−3	−3	−3	−3	−2	−2	−1	−1	−2	−3	−3	−3	−4	−4	−5	−5	−5	−5
(Denmark) Olesen	E	−1	−2	−1	−1	−1	−1	−2	−3	−2	−2	−2	−3	−4	−5	−5	−5	−4
(United States) Snedeker	−8	−8	−8	−7	−6	−6	−6	−7	−7	−6	−5	−5	−5	−4	−5	−5	−5	−4

Cumulative tournament scores, relative to par

=== Playoff ===
Place	Player	Score	To par	Money ($)
1	(Australia) Adam Scott	4-3=7	−1	1,440,000
2	(Argentina) Ángel Cabrera	4-4=8	E	864,000

The sudden-death playoff began on the 18th hole and ended on the 10th hole.

==== Scorecard ====
Playoff

Hole	18	10
Par	4	4
(Australia) Scott	E	−1
(Argentina) Cabrera	E	E

Cumulative sudden-death playoff scores, relative to par
