= United States at the 2019 Military World Games =

- Flag of the United States
- IOC code: USA

in Wuhan, China 18 October 2019 – 27 October 2019
- Medals Ranked 35th: Gold 0 Silver 3 Bronze 5 Total 8

Military World Games appearances
- 1995; 1999; 2003; 2007; 2011; 2015; 2019; 2023

The United States competed at the 2019 Military World Games held in Wuhan, China from 18 to 27 October 2019. In total, athletes representing the United States won three silver medals and five bronze medals and the country finished in 35th place in the medal table.

== Medal summary ==
=== Medal by sports ===
Medals by sport
Sport	1st place, gold medalist(s)	2nd place, silver medalist(s)	3rd place, bronze medalist(s)	Total
Basketball	0	1	1	2
Golf	0	1	2	3
Wrestling	0	1	2	3

=== Medalists ===
Medal	Name	Sport	Event
Silver	Men's national basketball team	Basketball	Men's tournament
Silver	Linda Jeffery; Melanie DeLeon; Laurel Gill	Golf	Women team
Silver	Whitney Conder	Wrestling	Women's freestyle 50 kg
Bronze	Women's national basketball team	Basketball	Women's tournament
Bronze	Linda Jeffery	Golf	Women individual
Bronze	Brandon Johnson; Justin Broussard; Ian Milne; Andrew Fecteau; Dalton Dishman; Russell Marion	Golf	Men team
Bronze	Max Nowry	Wrestling	Men's freestyle 57 kg
Bronze	Ildar Hafizov	Wrestling	Men's Greco-Roman 60 kg
