= Jimmy Mullen (golfer) =

English professional golfer (born 1993)

Personal information
- Nationality: England
- Born: 18 November 1993 (age 32) Bideford, England
- Height: 188 cm (6 ft 2 in)

Career
- Sport: Golf
- Turned professional: 2015
- Former tours: Challenge Tour; PGA EuroPro Tour

Best results in major championships
- Masters Tournament: DNP
- PGA Championship: DNP
- U.S. Open: DNP
- The Open Championship: T73: 2013

Jimmy Mullen (born 18 November 1993) is an English professional golfer.

== Career ==
Mullen is from Devon, England. Playing as an amateur, he made the cut at the 2013 Open Championship. He and Matt Fitzpatrick were the only two amateurs to make the cut. He played on the Great Britain and Ireland team in the 2015 Walker Cup, winning all four of his matches.

Mullen turned professional later in 2015 and made his professional debut at the Alfred Dunhill Links Championship.

== Amateur wins ==
- 2014 The Duncan Putter
- 2015 Welsh Open Stroke Play Championship

== Results in major championships ==
Tournament	2013
Masters Tournament	
U.S. Open	
The Open Championship	T73
PGA Championship	

Did not play

"T" = tied

== Team appearances ==
Amateur

- European Amateur Team Championship (representing England): 2015
- Walker Cup (representing Great Britain & Ireland): 2015 (winners)
