= 2013 Open Championship =

Coordinates: 56.043°N 2.823°W

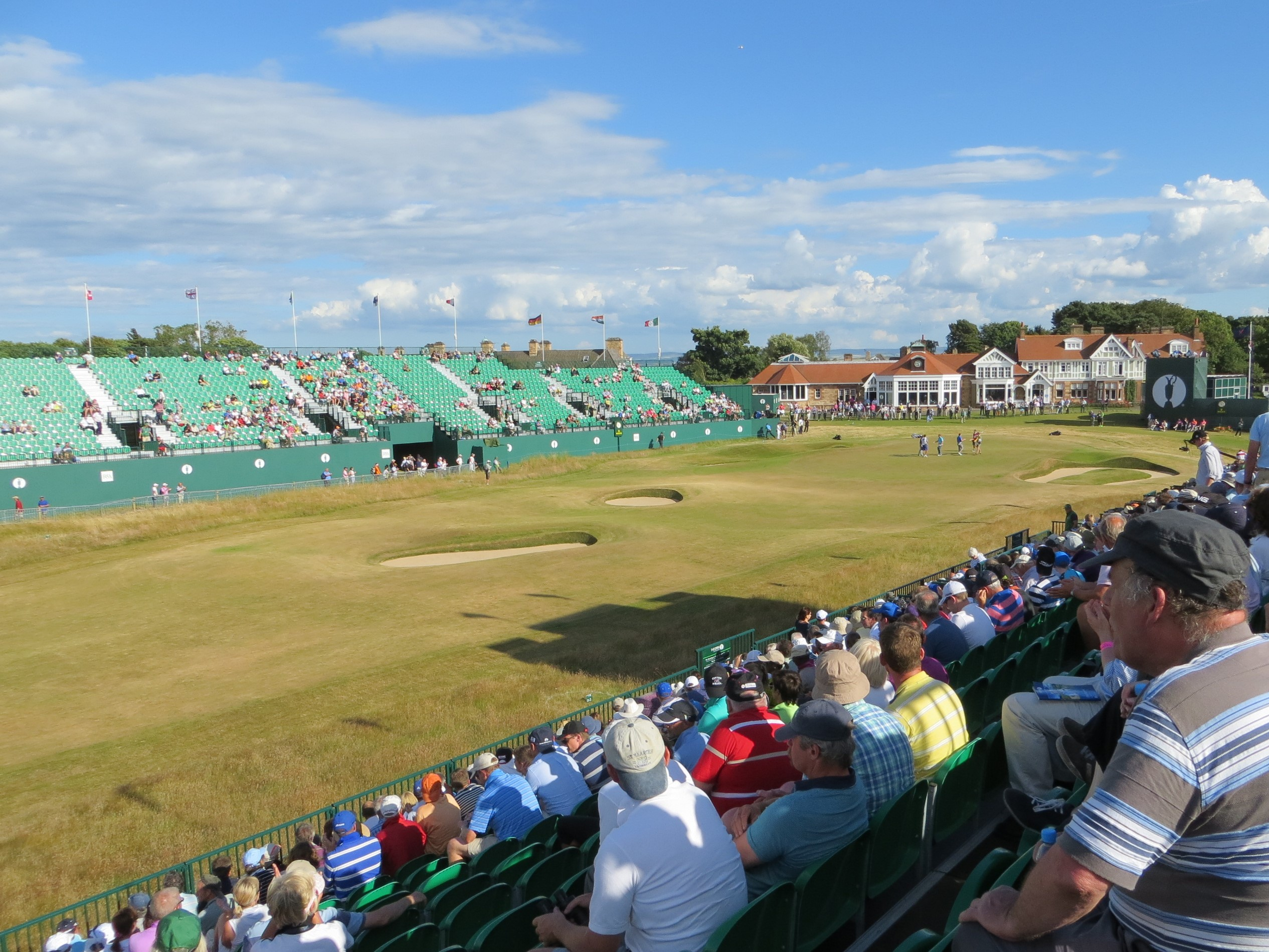
- Finishing hole at the 2013 Open

Tournament information
- Dates: 18–21 July 2013
- Location: Gullane, Scotland
- Course: Muirfield Golf Links
- Organized by: The R&A
- Tours: European Tour; PGA Tour; Japan Golf Tour

Statistics
- Par: 71
- Length: 7,192 yards (6,576 m)
- Field: 156 players, 84 after cut
- Cut: 150 (+8)
- Prize fund: £5,250,000 €6,096,111 $8,015,700
- Winner's share: £945,000 €1,097,570 $1,442,826

Champion
- (United States) Phil Mickelson
- 281 (−3)

Location in Scotland
Location in East Lothian, Scotland

The 2013 Open Championship was a men's major golf championship and the 142nd Open Championship, held from 18 to 21 July at Muirfield Golf Links in Gullane, East Lothian, Scotland. Phil Mickelson shot a final round 66 (−5) to win his fifth major title, three strokes ahead of runner-up Henrik Stenson. Mickelson began the round five strokes back, in a tie for ninth place. Ian Poulter, Adam Scott, and 54-hole leader Lee Westwood tied for third, four back of Mickelson.

== Venue ==
The 2013 event was the 16th Open Championship played at Muirfield. The most recent was in 2002, when Ernie Els won his third major championship in a playoff over Stuart Appleby, Steve Elkington, and ultimately in a sudden-death playoff over Thomas Levet. Nick Faldo won the previous Open at the venue, in 1992; the first was in 1892.

The course was extended 158 yards (144 m) since 2002.

=== Course layout ===
Hole	Yards	Par	Hole	Yards	Par
1	447	4	10	469	4
2	364	4	11	387	4
3	377	4	12	379	4
4	226	3	13	190	3
5	559	5	14	475	4
6	461	4	15	448	4
7	184	3	16	186	3
8	441	4	17	575	5
9	554	5	18	470	4
Out	3,613	36	In	3,579	35
Source:		Total		7,192	71

Lengths of the course for Opens since 1950:

- 2013: 7,192 yards (6,576 m), par 71
- 2002: 7,034 yards (6,432 m), par 71
- 1992: 6,970 yards (6,373 m), par 71
- 1987: 6,963 yards (6,367 m), par 71
- 1980: 6,926 yards (6,333 m), par 71
- 1972: 6,892 yards (6,302 m), par 71
- 1966: 6,887 yards (6,297 m), par 71
- 1959: 6,806 yards (6,223 m), par 72

== Field ==
Each player is classified according to the first category in which he qualified, but other categories are shown in parentheses.

1. The Open Champions aged 60 or under on 21 July 2013

- Mark Calcavecchia (3,4)
- Stewart Cink (2,3)
- Darren Clarke (2,3)
- Ben Curtis (2,3)
- David Duval
- Ernie Els (2,3,4,5,14)
- Nick Faldo
- Todd Hamilton (2)
- Pádraig Harrington (2,3,12)
- Paul Lawrie (5,6,17)
- Tom Lehman
- Justin Leonard (3)
- Sandy Lyle
- Mark O'Meara
- Louis Oosthuizen (2,3,5,6,14)
- Tiger Woods (2,3,4,5,13,14,17)
- John Daly withdrew with an elbow injury.
- Eligible but did not compete: Ian Baker-Finch, Greg Norman (3), Nick Price.

2. The Open Champions for 2003–2012

3. The Open Champions finishing in the first 10 and tying for 10th place in The Open Championship 2008–2012

- Tom Watson

4. First 10 and anyone tying for 10th place in the 2012 Open Championship at Royal Lytham & St Annes

- Thomas Aiken
- Nicolas Colsaerts (5,6,17)
- Luke Donald (5,6,7,14,17)
- Miguel Ángel Jiménez (6)
- Dustin Johnson (5,14,17)
- Zach Johnson (5,14,17)
- Matt Kuchar (5,13,14,17)
- Graeme McDowell (5,6,10,17)
- Alex Norén (6)
- Geoff Ogilvy
- Thorbjørn Olesen (5,6)
- Ian Poulter (5,6,17)
- Adam Scott (5,11,14)
- Vijay Singh
- Brandt Snedeker (5,14,17)

5. The first 50 players on the Official World Golf Ranking for Week 21, 2013

- Keegan Bradley (12,14,17)
- Tim Clark
- Jason Day
- Jamie Donaldson (6)
- Jason Dufner (14,17)
- Gonzalo Fernández-Castaño (6)
- Rickie Fowler (14)
- Jim Furyk (14,17)
- Sergio García (14,17)
- Robert Garrigus (14)
- Branden Grace (6,20)
- Bill Haas
- Peter Hanson (6,17)
- Thongchai Jaidee (6)
- Martin Kaymer (6,12,17)
- David Lynn (6)
- Hunter Mahan (14)
- Matteo Manassero (6,7)
- Rory McIlroy (6,10,12,14,17)
- Phil Mickelson (9,11,14,17)
- Francesco Molinari (6,17)
- Ryan Moore (14)
- Carl Pettersson (14)
- Scott Piercy (14)
- D. A. Points
- Justin Rose (6,10,14,17)
- Charl Schwartzel (6,11)
- Webb Simpson (10,14,17)
- Henrik Stenson
- Kevin Streelman
- Michael Thompson
- Bo Van Pelt (14)
- Nick Watney (14)
- Bubba Watson (11,14,17)
- Lee Westwood (6,14,17)
- Steve Stricker (14,17) did not enter.

6. First 30 in the Race to Dubai for 2012

- Rafa Cabrera-Bello
- George Coetzee
- Marcus Fraser
- Shane Lowry
- Richie Ramsay
- Marcel Siem
- Bernd Wiesberger
- Danny Willett

7. The BMW PGA Championship winners for 2011–2013

8. First 5 European Tour members and any European Tour members tying for 5th place, not otherwise exempt, in the top 20 of the Race to Dubai on completion of the 2013 Alstom Open de France

- Thomas Bjørn
- Mikko Ilonen
- Brett Rumford
- Richard Sterne
- Marc Warren

9. The Scottish Open Champion for 2013

10. The U.S. Open Champions for 2009–2013

- Lucas Glover

11. The Masters Tournament Champions for 2009–2013

- Ángel Cabrera

12. The PGA Champions for 2008–2012

- Yang Yong-eun

13. The Players Champions for 2011–2013

- K. J. Choi

14. The leading 30 qualifiers for the 2012 Tour Championship

- John Huh
- John Senden

15. First 5 PGA Tour members and any PGA Tour members tying for 5th place, not exempt in the top 20 of the PGA Tour FedEx Cup points list for 2013 on completion of the 2013 The Greenbrier Classic

- Harris English
- Russell Henley
- Billy Horschel
- Jimmy Walker
- Boo Weekley

16. The John Deere Classic winner for 2013

- Jordan Spieth

17. Playing members of the 2012 Ryder Cup teams

18. First and anyone tying for 1st place on the Order of Merit of the Asian Tour for 2012

- Thaworn Wiratchant

19. First and anyone tying for 1st place on the Order of Merit of the Tour of Australasia for 2012

- Peter Senior

20. First and anyone tying for 1st place on the Order of Merit of the Southern Africa PGA Sunshine Tour for 2012

21. The Japan Open Champion for 2012

- Kenichi Kuboya

22. First 2 and anyone tying for 2nd place, not exempt, on the Official Money List of the Japan Golf Tour for 2012

- Hiroyuki Fujita
- Toru Taniguchi

23. The leading 4 players, not exempt, in the 2013 Mizuno Open

- Makoto Inoue
- Brendan Jones
- Shingo Katayama
- Kim Kyung-tae

24. First 2 and anyone tying for 2nd place, in a cumulative money list taken from all official 2013 Japan Golf Tour events up to and including the 2013 Mizuno Open.

- Kim Hyung-sung
- Satoshi Kodaira

25. The Senior Open Champion for 2012

- Fred Couples

26. The Amateur Champion for 2013

- Garrick Porteous (a)

27. The U.S. Amateur Champion for 2012

- Steven Fox (a)

28. The European Amateur Champion for 2012

- Rhys Pugh (a)

29. The Mark H. McCormack Medal winner for 2012

- Chris Williams lost his exemption by turning professional after the U.S. Open.

=== Qualifying ===
==== International Final Qualifying ====
- Australasia: Mark Brown, Stephen Dartnall, Steven Jeffress
- Asia: Kiradech Aphibarnrat, Daisuke Maruyama, Hideki Matsuyama, Wu Ashun
- Africa: Eduardo de la Riva, Justin Harding, Darryn Lloyd
- America: Scott Brown, Bud Cauley, Brian Davis, Luke Guthrie, Robert Karlsson, Josh Teater, Camilo Villegas, Johnson Wagner
- Europe: Grégory Bourdy, Niclas Fasth, Oliver Fisher, Estanislao Goya, Scott Jamieson, Brooks Koepka, Gareth Maybin, Richard McEvoy, Álvaro Quirós

==== Local Final Qualifying ====
- Dunbar: Grant Forrest (a), Shiv Kapur, John Wade
- Gullane No 1: Matt Fitzpatrick (a), Oscar Florén, Ben Stow (a)
- North Berwick: Jimmy Mullen (a), George Murray, Gareth Wright
- The Musselburgh: Tyrrell Hatton, Lloyd Saltman, Steven Tiley

=== Alternates ===
To make up the full entry of 156, additional players were drawn from the Official World Golf Ranking dated 7 July 2013 (provided the player was entered in the Open and did not withdraw from qualifying).

1. Jonas Blixt (ranked 51)
2. Martin Laird (59)
3. Freddie Jacobson (63)
4. Marc Leishman (66)
5. Graham DeLaet (67)
6. Kyle Stanley (68)
7. Chris Wood (70)
8. Ken Duke (73)
9. Stephen Gallacher (75) replaced John Daly
10. Scott Stallings (76) took spot reserved for Scottish Open champion
- (a) denotes amateur

== Round summaries ==
=== First round ===
Thursday, 18 July 2013

Zach Johnson was the first round leader after shooting a 5-under-par 66. Both Johnson and Indian outsider Shiv Kapur reached 6-under during their rounds before dropping shots on the tougher back nine, Kapur doing so during difficult afternoon conditions by birdieing six of his first seven holes. Two Spaniards, 49-year-old Miguel Ángel Jiménez and Rafa Cabrera-Bello, had also reached 5-under before late bogeys, as had veteran Mark O'Meara. Two seniors were in the top five: O'Meara (56 years old), the 1998 champion, was tied for second at 67 and Tom Lehman (54), the 1996 champion, was tied for fourth at 68. Defending champion Ernie Els shot 74 (+3), tarnished by a triple-bogey after bunker trouble at the 16th. World number one Tiger Woods, playing in the tough later conditions, opened with a bogey after snap-hooking his tee shot and taking an unplayable lie, but fought his way back to 69 (−2) in pursuit of his 15th major championship. Out-of-form world number two Rory McIlroy, however, struggled to a 79 (+8) despite an early tee time. Phil Mickelson, four-time major champion and the winner of the previous week's Scottish Open, also had a 69 despite a closing bogey.

Place	Player	Score	To par
1	(United States) Zach Johnson	66	−5
T2	(Spain) Rafa Cabrera-Bello	67	−4
T2	(United States) Mark O'Meara	67	−4
T4	(Spain) Miguel Ángel Jiménez	68	−3
T4	(United States) Dustin Johnson	68	−3
T4	(India) Shiv Kapur	68	−3
T4	(United States) Tom Lehman	68	−3
T4	(United States) Brandt Snedeker	68	−3
T9	(Argentina) Ángel Cabrera	69	−2
T9	(United States) Todd Hamilton	69	−2
T9	(United States) Phil Mickelson	69	−2
T9	(Italy) Francesco Molinari	69	−2
T9	(United States) Jordan Spieth	69	−2
T9	(United States) Tiger Woods	69	−2

=== Second round ===
Friday, 19 July 2013

At the end of the second round, nine players were under par, and the cut line was +8. Jiménez was the leader at 139 (−3). Dustin Johnson, Henrik Stenson, Lee Westwood, and Woods were all one shot behind at 140.

Place	Player	Score	To par
1	(Spain) Miguel Ángel Jiménez	68-71=139	−3
T2	(United States) Dustin Johnson	68-72=140	−2
T2	(Sweden) Henrik Stenson	70-70=140	−2
T2	(England) Lee Westwood	72-68=140	−2
T2	(United States) Tiger Woods	69-71=140	−2
T6	(Argentina) Ángel Cabrera	69-72=141	−1
T6	(Spain) Rafa Cabrera-Bello	67-74=141	−1
T6	(United States) Zach Johnson	66-75=141	−1
T6	(Scotland) Martin Laird	70-71=141	−1
10	(United States) Ryan Moore	72-70=142	E

Amateurs: Fitzpatrick (+7), Mullen (+7), Porteous (+11), Stow (+11), Fox (+15), Forrest (+17), Pugh (+19).

=== Third round ===
Saturday, 20 July 2013

Westwood's 70 (−1) took the 54-hole lead at 210 (−3), which included a long eagle at the 5th hole. Hunter Mahan shot 68 (−3) to move into a tie for second at 212 (−1). Woods held sole possession of the lead early in the round, but carded 72 (+1) to fall back to 212 with Mahan. Adam Scott shot 70 (−1) to move to even-par 213.

Place	Player	Score	To par
1	(England) Lee Westwood	72-68-70=210	−3
T2	(United States) Hunter Mahan	72-72-68=212	−1
T2	(Spain) Miguel Ángel Jiménez	68-71-73=212	−1
T2	(United States) Tiger Woods	69-71-72=212	−1
5	(Australia) Adam Scott	71-72-70=213	E
T6	(Argentina) Ángel Cabrera	69-72-73=214	+1
T6	(United States) Zach Johnson	66-75-73=214	+1
T6	(United States) Ryan Moore	72-70-72=214	+1
T6	(Sweden) Henrik Stenson	70-70-74=214	+1
T10	(United States) Phil Mickelson	69-74-72=215	+2
T10	(Italy) Francesco Molinari	69-74-72=215	+2

=== Final round ===
Sunday, 21 July 2013

Through the first six holes, 54-hole leader Westwood was even for the day, but then faltered down the stretch. After a bogey on the 8th, Westwood relinquished the lead to Scott, who birdied the 11th to go two-under for the championship. Westwood bogeyed three more holes to finish at +1. "I didn't play badly, but I didn't play great", he remarked.

Mickelson, who started the round five shots back, carded a 34 (−2) on the front nine to get to even-par for the championship. After bogeying the 10th, he got back to even par with a birdie at the 13th, then birdied the 14th while Scott bogeyed the 13th and the two were tied for the lead at −1. After two pars, Mickelson birdied the final two holes to finish at 281 (−3). At that point, about an hour of play remained but Mickelson knew he had all but won the event. Scott followed up his bogey on the 13th with bogeys on each of the next three holes.

Stenson shot 70 (−1) and finished three strokes back of Mickelson in second place at even-par 284. Ian Poulter got hot in the middle of his round and posted a 67 (−4) to tie for third with Scott and Westwood. Woods started the day two strokes off the lead, but shot a 74 (+3) to tie for sixth. Mahan, who also started the day two strokes back, carded a 75 (+4) and tied for ninth.

Mickelson attained his fifth major title and first Open Championship. He had previously struggled at the event, recording just two finishes in the top-10 in 19 tries. Mickelson's caddy, Jim "Bones" Mackay, called the final round "the best round of his career." Mickelson agreed, saying "I don't care how I got it, [the Claret Jug trophy] ...it just so happened to be with one of the best rounds of my career ... I've always tried to go out and get it ... And today I did."

==== Final leaderboard ====
Champion
Silver Medal winner (low amateur)
(a) = amateur
(c) = past champion

Top 10
Place	Player	Score	To par	Money (£)
1	(United States) Phil Mickelson	69-74-72-66=281	−3	945,000
2	(Sweden) Henrik Stenson	70-70-74-70=284	E	545,000
T3	(England) Ian Poulter	72-71-75-67=285	+1	280,833
T3	(Australia) Adam Scott	71-72-70-72=285	+1	280,833
T3	(England) Lee Westwood	72-68-70-75=285	+1	280,833
T6	(United States) Zach Johnson	66-75-73-72=286	+2	163,333
T6	(Japan) Hideki Matsuyama	71-73-72-70=286	+2	163,333
T6	(United States) Tiger Woods (c)	69-71-72-74=286	+2	163,333
T9	(United States) Hunter Mahan	72-72-68-75=287	+3	115,000
T9	(Italy) Francesco Molinari	69-74-72-72=287	+3	115,000

Leaderboard below the top 10
Place	Player	Score	To par	Money (£)
T11	(Argentina) Ángel Cabrera	69-72-73-74=288	+4	93,500
T11	(United States) Brandt Snedeker	68-79-69-72=288	+4	93,500
T13	(Spain) Miguel Ángel Jiménez	68-71-73-77=289	+5	79,500
T13	(United States) Justin Leonard (c)	74-70-74-71=289	+5	79,500
T15	(United States) Keegan Bradley	75-74-70-71=290	+6	62,250
T15	(Spain) Eduardo de la Riva	73-73-75-69=290	+6	62,250
T15	(United States) Harris English	74-71-75-70=290	+6	62,250
T15	(United States) Matt Kuchar	74-73-72-71=290	+6	62,250
T15	(South Africa) Charl Schwartzel	75-68-76-71=290	+6	62,250
T15	(England) Danny Willett	75-72-72-71=290	+6	62,250
T21	(Spain) Rafa Cabrera-Bello	67-74-76-74=291	+7	47,300
T21	(Northern Ireland) Darren Clarke (c)	72-71-76-72=291	+7	47,300
T21	(Scotland) Stephen Gallacher	76-70-76-69=291	+7	47,300
T21	(Spain) Sergio García	75-73-68-75=291	+7	47,300
T21	(South Africa) Richard Sterne	75-75-68-73=291	+7	47,300
T26	(Sweden) Jonas Blixt	72-78-73-69=292	+8	37,250
T26	(United States) Stewart Cink (c)	72-75-76-69=292	+8	37,250
T26	(United States) Jason Dufner	72-77-76-67=292	+8	37,250
T26	(South Africa) Ernie Els (c)	74-74-70-74=292	+8	37,250
T26	(Scotland) Paul Lawrie (c)	81-69-70-72=292	+8	37,250
T26	(England) Steven Tiley	72-75-73-72=292	+8	37,250
T32	(United States) Bud Cauley	74-75-71-73=293	+9	25,708
T32	(United States) Fred Couples	75-74-73-71=293	+9	25,708
T32	(Australia) Jason Day	73-71-72-77=293	+9	25,708
T32	(Wales) Jamie Donaldson	74-71-71-77=293	+9	25,708
T32	(England) Oliver Fisher	70-78-77-68=293	+9	25,708
T32	(Thailand) Thongchai Jaidee	79-71-71-72=293	+9	25,708
T32	(United States) Dustin Johnson	68-72-76-77=293	+9	25,708
T32	(Germany) Martin Kaymer	72-74-72-75=293	+9	25,708
T32	(Republic of Ireland) Shane Lowry	74-74-75-70=293	+9	25,708
T32	(United States) Ryan Moore	72-70-72-79=293	+9	25,708
T32	(United States) Bubba Watson	70-73-77-73=293	+9	25,708
T32	(South Korea) Yang Yong-eun	78-70-73-72=293	+9	25,708
T44	(New Zealand) Mark Brown	77-73-72-72=294	+10	16,139
T44	(South Korea) K. J. Choi	76-74-73-71=294	+10	16,139
T44	(South Africa) Tim Clark	72-76-76-70=294	+10	16,139
T44	(England) Matt Fitzpatrick (a)	73-76-73-72=294	+10	0
T44	(Sweden) Freddie Jacobson	72-75-75-72=294	+10	16,139
T44	(Japan) Shingo Katayama	73-77-69-75=294	+10	16,139
T44	(Scotland) Martin Laird	70-71-81-72=294	+10	16,139
T44	(Australia) Geoff Ogilvy	75-75-72-72=294	+10	16,139
T44	(United States) Jordan Spieth	69-74-75-74=294	+10	16,139
T44	(United States) Bo Van Pelt	76-73-77-68=294	+10	16,139
T54	(Australia) Marcus Fraser	73-74-76-72=295	+11	13,725
T54	(Spain) Gonzalo Fernández-Castaño	70-79-73-73=295	+11	13,725
T54	(Republic of Ireland) Pádraig Harrington (c)	73-75-77-70=295	+11	13,725
T54	(Sweden) Carl Pettersson	74-76-70-75=295	+11	13,725
T58	(United States) Tom Lehman (c)	68-77-75-77=296	+12	13,150
T58	(Northern Ireland) Graeme McDowell	75-71-73-77=296	+12	13,150
T58	(United States) Mark O'Meara (c)	67-78-77-74=296	+12	13,150
T58	(Scotland) Richie Ramsay	76-74-72-74=296	+12	13,150
T58	(United States) Johnson Wagner	73-72-73-78=296	+12	13,150
T58	(United States) Boo Weekley	74-76-71-75=296	+12	13,150
T64	(France) Grégory Bourdy	76-70-74-77=297	+13	12,500
T64	(United States) Ben Curtis (c)	74-71-80-72=297	+13	12,500
T64	(United States) Ken Duke	70-77-73-77=297	+13	12,500
T64	(South Africa) Branden Grace	74-71-77-75=297	+13	12,500
T64	(United States) Webb Simpson	73-70-77-77=297	+13	12,500
T64	(Austria) Bernd Wiesberger	71-74-75-77=297	+13	12,500
T64	(England) Chris Wood	75-75-75-72=297	+13	12,500
T71	(South Africa) George Coetzee	75-71-75-76=298	+14	12,050
T71	(Wales) Gareth Wright	71-78-75-74=298	+14	12,050
T73	(Denmark) Thomas Bjørn	73-74-72-80=299	+15	11,700
T73	(United States) Todd Hamilton (c)	69-81-70-79=299	+15	11,700
T73	(United States) Russell Henley	78-71-75-75=299	+15	11,700
T73	(India) Shiv Kapur	68-77-83-71=299	+15	11,700
T73	(South Korea) Kim Kyung-tae	73-76-77-73=299	+15	11,700
T73	(England) Jimmy Mullen (a)	71-78-75-75=299	+15	0
T79	(Finland) Mikko Ilonen	72-78-76-74=300	+16	11,300
T79	(Australia) Peter Senior	74-76-73-77=300	+16	11,300
T79	(United States) Kevin Streelman	74-71-82-73=300	+16	11,300
82	(United States) Josh Teater	72-77-75-77=301	+17	11,100
83	(Canada) Graham DeLaet	76-72-76-79=303	+19	11,000
84	(Scotland) Sandy Lyle (c)	76-72-80-79=307	+23	10,900
CUT	(South Africa) Thomas Aiken	71-80=151	+9	
CUT	(Belgium) Nicolas Colsaerts	75-76=151	+9	
CUT	(Sweden) Oscar Florén	74-77=151	+9	
CUT	(United States) Bill Haas	77-74=151	+9	
CUT	(Australia) Marc Leishman	76-75=151	+9	
CUT	(Scotland) George Murray	76-75=151	+9	
CUT	(Spain) Álvaro Quirós	77-74=151	+9	
CUT	(Germany) Marcel Siem	75-76=151	+9	
CUT	(United States) Kyle Stanley	82-69=151	+9	
CUT	(United States) Michael Thompson	72-79=151	+9	
CUT	(Colombia) Camilo Villegas	72-79=151	+9	
CUT	(United States) Jimmy Walker	72-79=151	+9	
CUT	(United States) Mark Calcavecchia (c)	72-80=152	+10	
CUT	(Australia) Stephen Dartnall	80-72=152	+10	
CUT	(England) Luke Donald	80-72=152	+10	
CUT	(Sweden) Niclas Fasth	77-75=152	+10	
CUT	(Japan) Hiroyuki Fujita	78-74=152	+10	
CUT	(United States) Jim Furyk	78-74=152	+10	
CUT	(South Africa) Justin Harding	78-74=152	+10	
CUT	(South Korea) Kim Hyung-sung	76-76=152	+10	
CUT	(England) Justin Rose	75-77=152	+10	
CUT	(Scotland) Marc Warren	72-80=152	+10	
CUT	(United States) Nick Watney	75-77=152	+10	
CUT	(United States) Robert Garrigus	78-75=153	+11	
CUT	(United States) D. A. Points	78-75=153	+11	
CUT	(England) Garrick Porteous (a)	76-77=153	+11	
CUT	(Australia) John Senden	77-76=153	+11	
CUT	(England) Ben Stow (a)	76-77=153	+11	
CUT	(Japan) Toru Taniguchi	78-75=153	+11	
CUT	(United States) Tom Watson (c)	75-78=153	+11	
CUT	(China) Wu Ashun	76-77=153	+11	
CUT	(United States) Rickie Fowler	78-76=154	+12	
CUT	(United States) Billy Horschel	74-80=154	+12	
CUT	(United States) John Huh	74-80=154	+12	
CUT	(Sweden) Robert Karlsson	77-77=154	+12	
CUT	(England) David Lynn	79-75=154	+12	
CUT	(Northern Ireland) Gareth Maybin	78-76=154	+12	
CUT	(Northern Ireland) Rory McIlroy	79-75=154	+12	
CUT	(Denmark) Thorbjørn Olesen	78-76=154	+12	
CUT	(Fiji) Vijay Singh	77-77=154	+12	
CUT	(United States) Scott Stallings	76-78=154	+12	
CUT	(United States) David Duval (c)	76-79=155	+13	
CUT	(Australia) Steven Jeffress	76-79=155	+13	
CUT	(Japan) Kenichi Kuboya	76-79=155	+13	
CUT	(South Africa) Darryn Lloyd	79-76=155	+13	
CUT	(England) Richard McEvoy	73-82=155	+13	
CUT	(Australia) John Wade	74-81=155	+13	
CUT	(Argentina) Tano Goya	75-81=156	+14	
CUT	(United States) Lucas Glover	80-76=156	+14	
CUT	(Scotland) Scott Jamieson	80-76=156	+14	
CUT	(Australia) Brendan Jones	78-78=156	+14	
CUT	(United States) Brooks Koepka	76-80=156	+14	
CUT	(Australia) Brett Rumford	79-77=156	+14	
CUT	(Scotland) Lloyd Saltman	79-77=156	+14	
CUT	(Thailand) Thaworn Wiratchant	79-77=156	+14	
CUT	(Thailand) Kiradech Aphibarnrat	72-85=157	+15	
CUT	(England) Brian Davis	80-77=157	+15	
CUT	(England) Nick Faldo (c)	79-78=157	+15	
CUT	(United States) Steven Fox (a)	78-79=157	+15	
CUT	(Italy) Matteo Manassero	76-81=157	+15	
CUT	(Japan) Daisuke Maruyama	78-79=157	+15	
CUT	(United States) Luke Guthrie	78-80=158	+16	
CUT	(Scotland) Grant Forrest (a)	73-86=159	+17	
CUT	(Japan) Makoto Inoue	83-76=159	+17	
CUT	(United States) Scott Brown	79-81=160	+18	
CUT	(England) Tyrrell Hatton	82-79=161	+19	
CUT	(Japan) Satoshi Kodaira	80-81=161	+19	
CUT	(Wales) Rhys Pugh (a)	84-77=161	+19	
CUT	(United States) Scott Piercy	74-88=162	+20	
WD	(Sweden) Alex Norén	83	+12	
WD	(Sweden) Peter Hanson			
WD	(South Africa) Louis Oosthuizen (c)			

==== Scorecard ====
Final round

Hole	1	2	3	4	5	6	7	8	9	10	11	12	13	14	15	16	17	18
Par	4	4	4	3	5	4	3	4	5	4	4	4	3	4	4	3	5	4
(United States) Mickelson	+2	+2	+2	+2	+1	+1	+1	+1	E	+1	+1	+1	E	−1	−1	−1	−2	−3
(Sweden) Stenson	E	E	−1	−1	−1	−1	−1	E	−1	−1	−1	E	+1	+1	+1	+1	E	E
(England) Poulter	+5	+5	+6	+6	+5	+5	+5	+5	+3	+2	+1	E	E	E	E	+1	+1	+1
(Australia) Scott	+1	+1	+1	+2	+2	+2	+1	E	−1	−1	−2	−2	−1	E	+1	+2	+2	+1
(England) Westwood	−3	−3	−2	−2	−3	−3	−2	−1	−1	−1	−1	−1	E	E	E	+1	+1	+1
(United States) Johnson	+1	+1	+1	+1	+1	+1	+1	+1	+1	+1	E	E	E	+1	+1	+2	+2	+2
(Japan) Matsuyama	+3	+3	+3	+3	+2	+2	+2	+3	+3	+3	+3	+3	+2	+2	+2	+2	+2	+2
(United States) Woods	E	E	E	+1	+1	+2	+2	+2	+1	+2	+3	+2	+2	+1	+2	+2	+2	+2
(United States) Mahan	−1	E	E	+1	+1	+2	+2	+2	E	+1	+1	+2	+2	+2	+2	+2	+2	+3

Cumulative tournament scores, relative to par

Eagle	Birdie	Bogey
