= Kim Ja-young =

South Korean professional golfer

Kim Ja-young 김자영
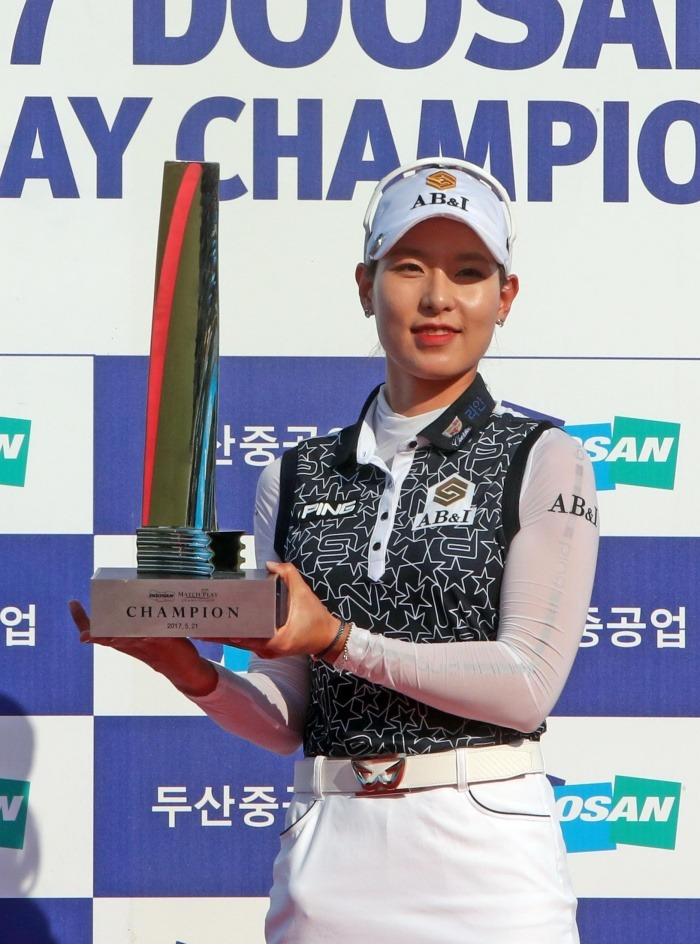
- Kim Ja-young won the 2017 Doosan Match Play Championship

Personal information
- Nationality: South Korea
- Born: 18 March 1991 (age 35) South Korea
- Height: 1.65 m (5 ft 5 in)

Career
- Sport: Golf
- Turned professional: 2009

Number of wins by tour
- LPGA of Korea Tour: 4

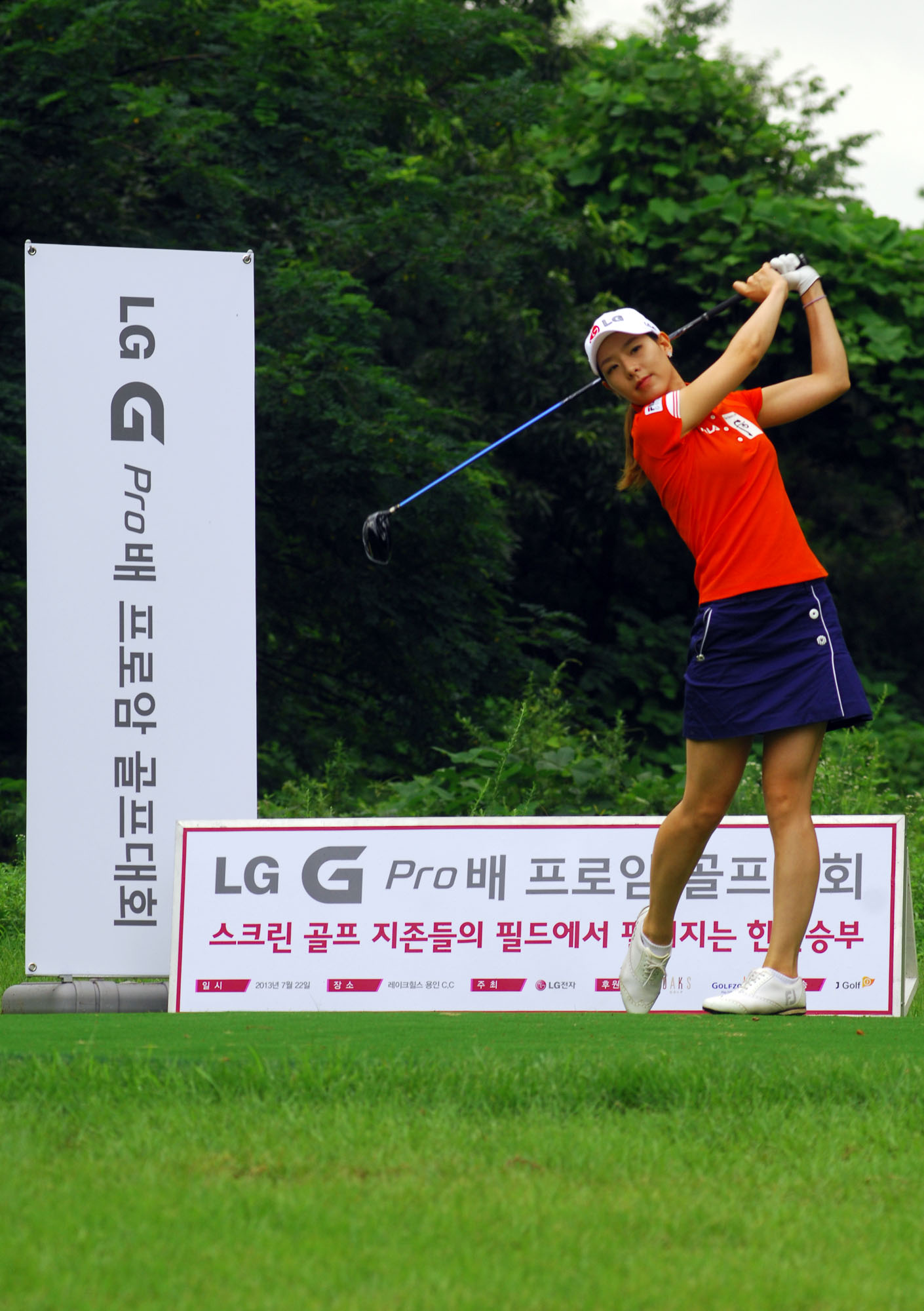

Kim Ja-young (Korean: 김자영; born 18 March 1991) is a South Korean professional golfer. Her name is sometimes translated as Kim Char-young. She plays on the LPGA of Korea Tour where she was won four times.

== Professional wins (4) ==
=== LPGA of Korea Tour wins (4) ===
No.	Date	Tournament	Winning score	To par	Margin of victory	Runner-up	Ref.
1	18–20 May 2012	Woori Investment & Securities Ladies Championship				(South Korea) Mirim Lee	
2	24–27 May 2012	Doosan Match Play Championship				(South Korea) Jung Yeon-ju	
3	10-12 August 2012	SBS Tour Hidden Valley Ladies Open				(South Korea) Yang Soo-jin	
4	17–21 May 2017	Doosan Match Play Championship				(South Korea) Inbee Park	
