= 2012 LPGA of Korea Tour =

This is the schedule for the 2012 LPGA of Korea Tour.

== 2012 schedule ==
Dates	Tournament	Host city	Purse (KRW)	Winner
Dec 16-18	Hyundai China Ladies Open	(China) Xiamen	$250,000	(South Korea) Kim Hye-youn (4)
Apr 12-15	Lotte Mart Ladies Open	(South Korea) Seogwipo	500,000,000	(South Korea) Kim Hyo-joo (am) (n/a)
Apr 27-29	eDaily-Livart Ladies Open	(South Korea) Yeoju	500,000,000	(South Korea) Lee Ye-jeong (1)
May 18–20	Woori Investment & Securities Ladies Championship	(South Korea) Yongin	500,000,000	(South Korea) Kim Char-young (1)
May 24–27	Doosan Match Play Championship	(South Korea) Chuncheon	500,000,000	(South Korea) Kim Char-young (2)
Jun 8-10	Lotte Cantata Ladies Open	(South Korea) Seogwipo	500,000,000	(South Korea) Jeong Hye-jin (1)
Jun 15-17	S-Oil Champions Invitational	(South Korea) Jeju City	500,000,000	(South Korea) Yang Soo-jin (4)
Aug 10-12	SBS Tour Hidden Valley Ladies Open	(South Korea) Jincheon	500,000,000	(South Korea) Kim Char-young (3)
Aug 16-19	Nefs Masterpiece	(South Korea) Hongcheon	600,000,000	(South Korea) Yang Je-yoon (1)
Aug 23-26	**Kia Motors Korea Women's Open**	(South Korea) Incheon	600,000,000	(South Korea) Lee Mi-rim (2)
Aug 31 - Sep 2	LIG Classic	(South Korea) Pocheon	500,000,000	(South Korea) Kim Ji-hyun2 (1)
Sep 6-9	Hanwha Finance Classic	(South Korea) Taean	1,200,000,000	(South Korea) So Yeon Ryu (8)
Sep 13-16	**Metlife-Hankyung KLPGA Championship**	(South Korea) Ansan	700,000,000	(South Korea) Jung Hee-won (1)
Sep 21-23	KDB Daewoo Securities Classic	(South Korea) Pyeongchang	600,000,000	(South Korea) Se Ri Pak (8)
Oct 5-7	Rush & Cash Charity Classic	(South Korea) Jeju City	500,000,000	(South Korea) Kim Ha-Neul (7)
Oct 11-14	**Hite Jinro Championship**	(South Korea) Yeoju	600,000,000	(South Korea) Yoon Seul-a (2)
Oct 19-21	LPGA KEB-HanaBank Championship	(South Korea) Incheon	$1,800,000	(Norway) Suzann Pettersen (n/a)
Oct 25-28	**KB Financial STAR Championship**	(South Korea) Incheon	700,000,000	(South Korea) Jang Ha-na (1)
Nov 2-4	BS Financial Group Busan Bank-Seokyung Ladies Open	(South Korea) Busan	600,000,000	(South Korea) Lee Jung-min (2)
Nov 9-11	MBN-KYJ Golf Ladies Open	(South Korea) Seogwipo	400,000,000	Cancelled due to inclement weather
Nov 16-18	ADT CAPS Championship	Singapore	400,000,000	(South Korea) Yang Je-yoon (2)

Events in bold are majors.

LPGA KEB-HanaBank Championship is co-sanctioned with LPGA Tour.
Hyundai China Ladies Open is co-sanctioned with China LPGA Tour.

== See also ==
- 2012 in golf
