= Guan Tianlang =

Chinese golfer (born 1998)

Personal information
- Nationality: China
- Born: 25 October 1998 (age 28) Guangzhou, China
- Height: 5 ft 10 in (1.78 m)

Career
- Sport: Golf
- College: University of Arizona (2017-2019)
- Turned professional: 2020
- Current tour: China Tour

Best results in major championships
- Masters Tournament: 58th: 2013
- PGA Championship: DNP
- U.S. Open: DNP
- The Open Championship: DNP

Guan Tianlang (Chinese: 关天朗; pinyin: Guān Tiānlǎng; born 25 October 1998) is a Chinese professional golfer.

== Career ==
Guan qualified for the 2013 Masters Tournament by winning the 2012 Asia-Pacific Amateur Championship in Thailand. On 12 April 2013, he became the youngest player to make the cut in PGA Tour history and play in 2013 Masters. At 14 years, 5 months of age, Guan is the youngest to make the cut in a major championship. Previously, the youngest was Italian Matteo Manassero, who did it at the 2009 Open Championship at 16 years, 2 months.

Before the tournament, Guan played practice rounds with Ben Crenshaw and Tiger Woods, both of whom were full of praise for the youngster. Woods said, "It's frightening to think that he was born after I won my first Masters. I mean, that's just frightening. It's exciting that I have inspired kids to play and not just here in the States but obviously in China and around the world."

Speaking of the experience, Guan said, "Each time I play with him I feel a lot better and give myself some confidence and it's very good. He told me a lot. We really enjoyed it on the golf course."

Guan was given the first slow play penalty since Grégory Bourdy at the 2010 PGA Championship; the last time the PGA Tour utilized a slow-play penalty in a non-major was against Glen Day at the 1995 Honda Classic.

Two weeks later he played in the Zurich Classic of New Orleans as a result of a sponsors exemption given to him by Zurich when he won the Asia-Pacific Amateur Championship. Guan made the cut on the number (−3) thanks to rounds of 72 and 69. However he fell back on the weekend and finished last in the field (71st).

In a 2014 interview with Golf.com, Guan reflected on his experience at the 2013 Masters. "I absolutely enjoyed every second of it," Guan says of his experience at Augusta, where he finished 58th. "After it was over, it was a little bit overwhelming, but it didn't take me too long to go back to a normal life."

He played with the golf team of the University of Arizona from 2017 to 2019 before turning pro in 2020.

== Amateur wins ==
- 2012 Asia-Pacific Amateur Championship

== Results in major championships ==
Tournament	2013
Masters Tournament	58LA
U.S. Open	
The Open Championship	
PGA Championship	

Did not play

LA = Low amateur

== Team appearances ==
- Eisenhower Trophy (representing China): 2012
