= Rafael Becker =

Brazilian professional golfer (born 1991)

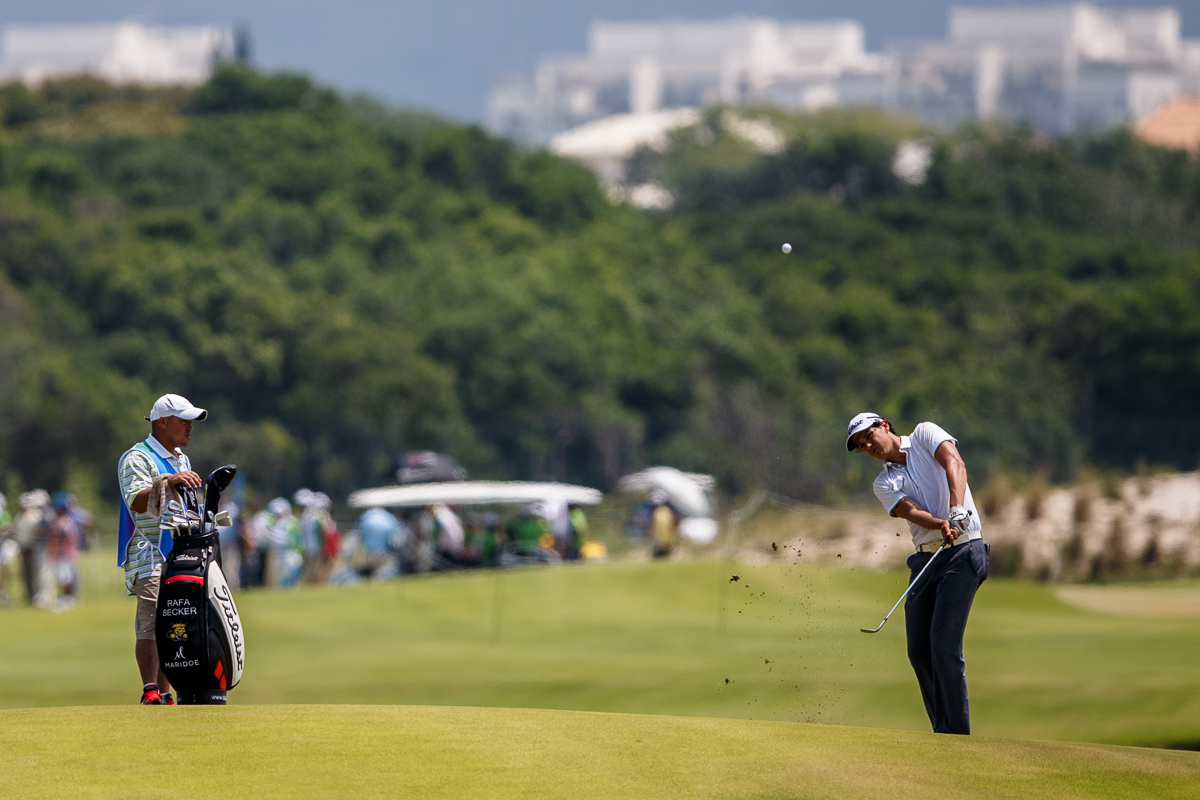

Personal information
- Full name: Rafael da Silveira Becker
- Nationality: Brazil
- Born: 2 April 1991 (age 35) São Paulo, Brazil
- Height: 6 ft 3 in (1.91 m)
- Weight: 188 lb (85 kg; 13.4 st)

Career
- Sport: Golf
- College: Wichita State University
- Turned professional: 2013
- Current tour: Korn Ferry Tour
- Former tour: PGA Tour Latinoamérica
- Professional wins: 2

Rafael da Silveira Becker (born 2 April 1991) is a Brazilian professional golfer who is currently a member of Korn Ferry Tour.

== Amateur career ==
As a junior, Becker twice won the Brazilian Junior Golf Championship in 2008 and 2009 and won the 2008 under 17s Faldo series event in Brazil.

As an amateur, Becker continued this success with three consecutive wins at the 2010, 2011 and 2012 Brazilian Amateur Championship. He also played in the 2012 Eisenhower Trophy in Turkey as part of the Brazilian team.

At college level, Becker represented the Wichita State Shockers during which time he was named Missouri Valley Conference Player of the Year in 2012 and was part of a team that won the Missouri Valley Conference title in each of his college years.

== Professional career ==
Becker turned professional in August 2013 after graduating from Wichita State and earned his status on PGA Tour Latinoamérica for 2014 through qualifying at the Developmental Series Final Samsung Tournament in Lima, Peru.

Becker's first win as a professional came on the Brazilian Golf Circuit at the event at Porto Alegre Country Club. He followed this up with his first win on PGA Tour Latinoamérica by winning his national championship at the 2014 Aberto do Brasil.

== Amateur wins ==
- 2010 Brazilian Amateur
- 2011 Brazilian Amateur
- 2012 Brazilian Amateur

== Professional wins (2) ==
=== PGA Tour Latinoamérica wins (1) ===
No.	Date	Tournament	Winning score	Margin of victory	Runners-up
1	9 Nov 2014	Aberto do Brasil	−14 (67-66-67-62=262)	3 strokes	(Argentina) Ariel Cañete, (United States) Joel Dahmen

=== PGA Tour Latinoamérica Developmental Series wins (1) ===
No.	Date	Tournament	Winning score	Margin of victory	Runner-up
1	23 Aug 2014	CBG Pro Tour Porto Alegre	−8 (67-69-66=202)	Playoff	(Argentina) Mauricio Molina

== Team appearances ==
Amateur

- Eisenhower Trophy (representing Brazil): 2010, 2012
