= Basketball at the 2019 Military World Games – Men's tournament =

Men's Basketball at the 2019 Military World Games
- Venue: Wuhan Hongshan Gymnasium
- Date: 19 – 26 October
- Competitors: 118 from 10 nations

Medalists
gold medal	Lithuania
silver medal	United States
bronze medal	China

The Men's Basketball tournament at the 2019 Military World Games was held in Wuhan, China from 19 to 26 October.

== Preliminary round ==
=== Group A ===
Pos	Team	Pld	W	L	GF	GA	GD	Pts	Qualification
1	China	4	4	0	374	276	+98	8	Semi-finals
2	United States	4	3	1	317	328	−11	7	Semi-finals
3	Congo	4	2	2	272	292	−20	6	
4	Mongolia	4	1	3	304	333	−29	5	
5	Qatar	4	0	4	248	286	−38	4	

October 19, 2019
:

Qatar	49–60	Congo

Wuhan Hongshan Gymnasium, Wuhan

October 19, 2019
:

China	104–71	Mongolia

Wuhan Hongshan Gymnasium, Wuhan

October 20, 2019
:

Mongolia	72–74	Congo

Wuhan Hongshan Gymnasium, Wuhan

October 20, 2019
:

United States	79–98	China

Wuhan Hongshan Gymnasium, Wuhan

October 21, 2019
:

Congo	76–79	United States

Wuhan Hongshan Gymnasium, Wuhan

October 21, 2019
:

Mongolia	75–67	Qatar

Wuhan Hongshan Gymnasium, Wuhan

October 22, 2019
:

United States	71–68	Qatar

Wuhan Hongshan Gymnasium, Wuhan

October 22, 2019
:

China	92–62	Congo

Wuhan Hongshan Gymnasium, Wuhan

October 23, 2019
:

Mongolia	86–88	United States

Wuhan Hongshan Gymnasium, Wuhan

October 23, 2019
:

Qatar	64–80	China

Wuhan Hongshan Gymnasium, Wuhan

=== Group B ===
Pos	Team	Pld	W	L	GF	GA	GD	Pts	Qualification
1	Brazil	4	3	1	270	244	+26	7	Semi-finals
2	Lithuania	4	3	1	321	269	+52	7	Semi-finals
3	Greece	4	2	2	338	314	+24	6	
4	South Korea	4	2	2	366	361	+5	6	
5	Germany	4	0	4	257	364	−107	4	

October 19, 2019
:

Germany	61–89	Greece

Wuhan Hongshan Gymnasium, Wuhan

October 19, 2019
:

Brazil	74–78	South Korea

Wuhan Hongshan Gymnasium, Wuhan

October 20, 2019
:

Greece	58–62	Brazil

Wuhan Hongshan Gymnasium, Wuhan

October 20, 2019
:

Lithuania	87–54	Germany

Wuhan Hongshan Gymnasium, Wuhan

October 21, 2019
:

Brazil	64–59	Lithuania

Wuhan Hongshan Gymnasium, Wuhan

October 21, 2019
:

South Korea	99–111	Greece

Wuhan Hongshan Gymnasium, Wuhan

October 22, 2019
:

Lithuania	83–71	South Korea

Wuhan Hongshan Gymnasium, Wuhan

October 22, 2019
:

Germany	49–70	Brazil

Wuhan Hongshan Gymnasium, Wuhan

October 23, 2019
:

South Korea	118–93	Germany

Wuhan Hongshan Gymnasium, Wuhan

October 23, 2019
:

Greece	80–92	Lithuania

Wuhan Hongshan Gymnasium, Wuhan

== Classification round ==
=== 9th-10th place ===
October 25, 2019
13:00

Qatar	72–89	Germany

Wuhan Hongshan Gymnasium, Wuhan

=== 7th-8th place ===
October 25, 2019
15:30

Mongolia	107–114	South Korea

Wuhan Hongshan Gymnasium, Wuhan

=== 5th-6th place ===
October 26, 2019
13:00

Congo	62–78	Greece

Wuhan Hongshan Gymnasium, Wuhan

== Final round ==
=== Semi-finals ===
October 25, 2019
18:30

United States	78–61	Brazil

Wuhan Hongshan Gymnasium, Wuhan

October 25, 2019
21:00

China	67–70	Lithuania

Wuhan Hongshan Gymnasium, Wuhan

=== Bronze-medal match ===
October 26, 2019
15:30

Brazil	64–68	China

Wuhan Hongshan Gymnasium, Wuhan

=== Gold-medal match ===
October 26, 2019
19:00

United States	83–91	Lithuania

Wuhan Hongshan Gymnasium, Wuhan

Lithuania defeated the United States, 91–83, in the gold-medal match.

== Final standing ==
Rank	Team
1st place, gold medalist(s)	Lithuania
2nd place, silver medalist(s)	United States
3rd place, bronze medalist(s)	China
4	Brazil
5	Greece
6	Congo
7	South Korea
8	Mongolia
9	Germany
10	Qatar
