= Alan Dunbar =

Northern Irish professional golfer

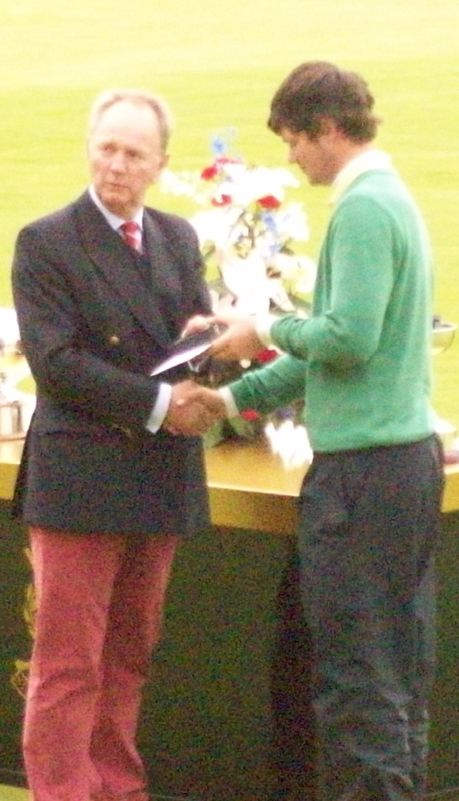
- Dunbar receiving the 2012 St Andrews Links Trophy

Personal information
- Full name: Alan Dunbar
- Nationality: Northern Ireland
- Born: 30 April 1990 (age 36) Ballymoney, Northern Ireland
- Height: 6 ft 1 in (1.85 m)

Career
- Sport: Golf
- Turned professional: 2013
- Former tour: Challenge Tour

Best results in major championships
- Masters Tournament: CUT: 2013
- PGA Championship: DNP
- U.S. Open: DNP
- The Open Championship: CUT: 2012

Alan Dunbar (born 30 April 1990) is a Northern Irish professional golfer who won the 2012 Amateur Championship at Royal Troon. His home club is Rathmore Golf Club near Portrush, County Antrim.

== Career ==
Dunbar won the Ulster Youths Amateur Open in 2008, the St Andrews Links Trophy in 2009 and the North of Ireland Amateur Open and the Irish Open Amateur in 2010.

Dunbar played in the winning 2011 Walker Cup team. Partnered with Paul Cutler they won both their foursome matches, although Dunbar lost his singles match on the final day.

Dunbar won the Amateur Championship in June 2012 defeating Austrian teenager Matthias Schwab by one hole at Royal Troon. Dunbar and Schwab exchanged the lead five times in the 36 hole final. Schwab led by 1 hole after the morning round but after 5 holes of the afternoon Dunbar was 2 holes ahead. However Schwab was again 1 hole ahead with 2 holes to play, but Dunbar won the last two holes to gain a narrow victory.

Dunbar has played in the 2010, 2011 and 2012 Irish Opens but has failed to make the cut on each occasion. In the 2012 Irish Open at Royal Portrush he opened with a 71 (-1) but in the second round shot a 78.

His victory in the 2012 Amateur Championship brought Dunbar an invitation to the 2012 Open Championship. He had a disappointing opening round of 75 which included a triple-bogey and two double-bogeys and despite a second round 71 he missed the cut.

The Amateur Championship win also gave him automatic qualification to the 2013 Masters and 2013 U.S. Open provided he remained an amateur. He played in the Masters then turned professional, forfeiting his exemption to the U.S. Open. Dunbar made his professional debut at the Challenge de Madrid, an event on the second-tier Challenge Tour, where he missed the cut.

== Amateur wins ==
this list may be incomplete

- 2009 St Andrews Links Trophy
- 2010 Irish Amateur Open Championship
- 2012 Amateur Championship

== Results in major championships ==
Tournament	2012	2013
Masters Tournament		CUT
U.S. Open		
The Open Championship	CUT	
PGA Championship		

Did not play

CUT = missed the half-way cut

== Team appearances ==
Amateur

- Jacques Léglise Trophy (representing Great Britain & Ireland): 2008 (winners)
- European Amateur Team Championship (representing Ireland): 2009, 2010
- Walker Cup (representing Great Britain & Ireland): 2011 (winners)
- Eisenhower Trophy (representing Ireland): 2010, 2012
- St Andrews Trophy (representing Great Britain & Ireland): 2012
- Bonallack Trophy (representing Europe): 2012 (winners)
