= Basketball at the 2019 Military World Games =

- Venues: Wuhan Hongshan Gymnasium (Men's); Huazhong University of Science and Technology Optics Valley Gymnasium (Women's)
- Dates: 19 – 25 October

Basketball at the 2019 Military World Games was held in Wuhan, China from 19 to 25 October 2019.

== Medal summary ==
=== Results ===
Event	Gold	Silver	Bronze
Men	Lithuania	United States	China
Women	China	Brazil	United States

=== Medal table ===
* Host nation (China)

Rank	Nation	Gold	Silver	Bronze	Total
1	China*	1	0	1	2
2	Lithuania	1	0	0	1
3	United States	0	1	1	2
4	Brazil	0	1	0	1
Totals (4 entries)		2	2	2	6
