= 2012 Eisenhower Trophy =

Tournament information
- Dates: 4–7 October
- Location: Antalya, Turkey; 36.8874°N 30.7075°E
- Courses: Antalya Golf Club (PGA Sultan course); Cornelia Golf Club (Faldo course)
- Format: 72 holes stroke play

Statistics
- Par: 71 (Antalya); 72 (Cornelia)
- Field: 72 teams 215 players

Champion
- United States; Steven Fox, Justin Thomas & Chris Williams
- 404 (−24)

Location map
- Location in Turkey

The 2012 Eisenhower Trophy took place 4–7 October on the PGA Sultan course at Antalya Golf Club and the Faldo course at Cornelia Golf Club in Antalya, Turkey. It was the 28th World Amateur Team Championship for the Eisenhower Trophy. The tournament was a 72-hole stroke play team event with 72 three-man teams. The best two scores for each round counted towards the team total. Each team was due to play two rounds on the two courses.

A weather delay on the second morning meant that the second round was not completed until the third day and the event was reduced to 54 holes. The leading 36 teams played their third round at Antalya Golf Club with the remaining teams playing at Cornelia Golf Club.

United States won their 14th Eisenhower Trophy, four strokes ahead of Mexico, who took the silver medal. France, Germany and South Korea tied for third place and took bronze medals. Sebastián Vázquez from Mexico had the best 54-hole aggregate of 199, 15 under par. Positions were decided by scores relative to par.

== Teams ==
72 teams contested the event. Each team had three players with the exception of Croatia who were represented by only two players.

The following table lists the players on the leading teams.

Country	Players
Australia	Daniel Nisbet, Cameron Smith, Matt Stieger
Austria	Lukas Nemecz, Tobias Nemecz, Manuel Trappel
Canada	Albin Choi, Corey Conners, Mackenzie Hughes
Colombia	Ricardo Celia, Carlos Rodríguez, Marcelo Rozo
England	Craig Hinton, Garrick Porteous, Neil Raymond
France	Paul Barjon, Julien Brun, Édouard España
Germany	Moritz Lampert, Max Rottluff, Marcel Schneider
Ireland	Alan Dunbar, Gavin Moynihan, Kevin Phelan
Italy	Filippo Bergamaschi, Giorgio De Filippi, Renato Paratore
Japan	Kenta Konishi, Jinichiro Kozuma, Hideki Matsuyama
Malaysia	Arie Fauzi, Gavin Green, Low Khai Jei
Mexico	Rodolfo Cazaubón, Carlos Ortiz, Sebastián Vázquez
Netherlands	Rowin Caron, Daan Huizing, Robin Kind
Norway	Anders Engell, Kristian Krogh Johannessen, Kristoffer Ventura
Poland	Mateusz Gradecki, Adrian Meronk, Jan Szmidt
Scotland	Matthew Clark, Graeme Robertson, Paul Shields
South Africa	Zander Lombard, Haydn Porteous, Brandon Stone
South Korea	Kim Si-woo, Lee Chang-woo, Lee Soo-min
Spain	Scott Fernández, Jacobo Pastor, Carlos Pigem
Sweden	Daniel Jennevret, Robert S. Karlsson, Pontus Widegren
Thailand	Itthipat Buranatanyarat, Poom Saksansin, Nattawat Suvajanakorn
United States	Steven Fox, Justin Thomas, Chris Williams
Venezuela	Jorge García, Gustavo Leon, Julio Vegas
Wales	James Frazer, Rhys Pugh, Ben Westgate
Zimbabwe	Ray Badenhorst, Barry Painting, Scott Vincent

== Results ==
Place	Country	Score	To par
1st place, gold medalist(s)	United States	131-135-138=404	−24
2nd place, silver medalist(s)	Mexico	135-139-135=409	−19
3rd place, bronze medalist(s)	France	135-140-138=413	−15
3rd place, bronze medalist(s)	Germany	141-135-137=413	−15
3rd place, bronze medalist(s)	South Korea	134-138-141=413	−15
T6	Canada	136-138-143=417	−11
T6	Norway	140-136-141=417	−11
8	England	137-143-138=418	−10
T9	Japan	141-139-139=419	−9
T9	Spain	137-144-138=419	−9
T9	Venezuela	138-142-139=419	−9
T12	Malaysia	140-141-139=420	−8
T12	Sweden	141-137-142=420	−8
14	Italy	141-140-141=422	−6
15	Australia	147-140-136=423	−5
16	Colombia	143-146-135=424	−4
T17	Netherlands	137-139-149=425	−3
T17	Poland	143-146-136=425	−3
T17	Thailand	144-143-138=425	−3
T17	Wales	144-143-138=425	−3
T17	Zimbabwe	138-147-140=425	−3
22	Austria	140-142-144=426	−2
23	South Africa	145-144-138=427	−1
T24	India	145-144-139=428	E
T24	New Zealand	142-142-144=428	E
26	Brazil	147-141-141=429	+1
T27	Chile	142-144-144=430	+2
T27	Denmark	148-139-143=430	+2
T27	Iceland	144-145-141=430	+2
T27	Ireland	141-142-147=430	+2
T27	Slovakia	144-141-145=430	+2
T32	Portugal	146-136-149=431	+3
T32	Slovenia	146-143-142=431	+3
34	Belgium	148-141-143=432	+4
35	Finland	143-148-142=433	+5
T36	Singapore	150-143-143=436	+6
T36	Turkey	145-146-143=434	+6
38	China	150-142-145=437	+7
39	Puerto Rico	146-147-145=438	+8
40	Czech Republic	153-144-142=439	+9
41	Guatemala	147-148-145=440	+10
42	Switzerland	146-146-149=441	+11
43	Russia	149-145-148=442	+12
T44	Hong Kong	149-150-145=444	+14
T44	Scotland	152-149-143=444	+14
46	Argentina	146-146-154=446	+16
T47	Chinese Taipei	148-149-155=452	+22
T47	Uruguay	153-154-145=452	+22
49	Bolivia	150-148-155=453	+23
50	Peru	153-143-158=454	+24
51	Bermuda	145-152-160=457	+27
52	Dominican Republic	154-148-156=458	+28
53	Fiji	154-153-156=463	+33
54	Pakistan	156-155-153=464	+34
55	Latvia	152-162-155=469	+39
56	Greece	161-156-158=475	+45
57	Costa Rica	160-156-162=478	+48
T58	Egypt	171-153-157=481	+51
T58	Qatar	161-157-163=481	+51
60	Estonia	154-163-167=484	+54
61	United Arab Emirates	169-151-170=490	+60
62	Serbia	163-160-168=491	+61
63	Macedonia	155-170-167=492	+62
64	Iran	163-174-159=496	+66
65	Malta	171-161-166=498	+68
66	Guam	165-171-163=499	+69
67	Bahrain	173-172-169=514	+84
68	Bulgaria	176-168-180=524	+94
69	Oman	178-176-174=528	+98
70	Ukraine	177-175-182=534	+104
71	Croatia	180-182-189=551	+121
72	Kyrgyzstan	203-211-228=642	+212

The leading 36 teams played their third round at Antalya Golf Club with the remaining teams playing at Cornelia Golf Club.

== Individual leaders ==
There was no official recognition for the lowest individual scores.

Place	Player	Country	Score	To par
1	Sebastián Vázquez	Mexico	66-67-66=199	−15
2	Chris Williams	United States	64-67-69=200	−14
3	Moritz Lampert	Germany	70-66-65=201	−13
T4	Julio Vegas	Venezuela	69-70-65=204	−10
T4	Julien Brun	France	67-72-65=204	−10
6	James Frazer	Wales	70-70-66=206	−8
T7	Lee Chang-woo	South Korea	68-67-72=207	−7
T7	Adrian Meronk	Poland	68-74-65=207	−7
T7	Justin Thomas	United States	67-70-70=207	−7
T10	Steven Fox	United States	71-68-69=208	−6
T10	Neil Raymond	England	66-72-70=208	−6
T10	Rafael Becker	Brazil	70-69-69=208	−6

Players in the leading teams played two rounds at Antalya Golf Club and one at Cornelia Golf Club.
