= Steven Fox (golfer) =

American professional golfer (born 1991)

Personal information
- Nationality: United States
- Born: January 14, 1991 (age 35) Greenville, South Carolina, U.S.
- Height: 6 ft 3 in (1.91 m)
- Weight: 160 lb (73 kg; 11 st)

Career
- Sport: Golf
- College: University of Tennessee at Chattanooga
- Turned professional: 2013
- Current tour: PGA Tour Latinoamérica
- Former tour: Web.com Tour
- Professional wins: 1

Best results in major championships
- Masters Tournament: CUT: 2013
- PGA Championship: DNP
- U.S. Open: CUT: 2013
- The Open Championship: CUT: 2013

Steven Fox (born January 14, 1991) is an American professional golfer who won the 2012 U.S. Amateur.

== Early life and amateur career ==
In 1991, Fox was born in Greenville, South Carolina. He attended Hendersonville High School in Hendersonville, Tennessee and the University of Tennessee at Chattanooga. Fox won the 2012 U.S. Amateur at Cherry Hills Country Club on the 37th hole after being down two with two holes to play. Fox was the 63rd player to qualify for match play. He had to survive a 17-man playoff for 14 spots in stroke play to qualify for the match play of the U.S. Amateur. With the win, Fox qualified for the 2013 Masters Tournament, 2013 U.S. Open, and 2013 Open Championship where he missed the cut at all three events.

Fox won the Tennessee State Amateur in August 2013.

== Professional career ==
In September 2013, Fox turned professional. He played on the Web.com Tour in 2016 after earning his tour card through qualifying school and playing on that tour in 2014. In 2016 he finished 128th in the rankings, playing 20 tournaments, and did not return in 2017.

== Amateur wins ==
- 2013 Tennessee Amateur

== Professional wins (1) ==
- 2014 Tennessee Open

== Results in major championships ==
Tournament	2013
Masters Tournament	CUT
U.S. Open	CUT
The Open Championship	CUT
PGA Championship	

Did not play

CUT = missed the half-way cut
"T" = tied

== U.S. national team appearances ==
Amateur

- Eisenhower Trophy: 2012 (winners)
