= Michael Weaver (golfer) =

American professional golfer (born 1991)

Personal information
- Full name: Michael James Weaver
- Nationality: United States
- Born: April 12, 1991 (age 35) Fresno, California, U.S.
- Height: 5 ft 9 in (1.75 m)
- Weight: 175 lb (79 kg; 12.5 st)

Career
- Sport: Golf
- College: University of California, Berkeley
- Turned professional: 2014
- Current tour: Web.com Tour

Best results in major championships
- Masters Tournament: CUT: 2013
- PGA Championship: DNP
- U.S. Open: 64th: 2013
- The Open Championship: DNP

Michael James Weaver (born April 12, 1991) is an American professional golfer.

== Amateur career ==
Weaver finished 64th at the 2013 U.S. Open as an amateur. Weaver was also runner-up at the 2012 U.S. Amateur.

== Results in major championships ==
Tournament	2013
Masters Tournament	CUT
U.S. Open	64
The Open Championship	
PGA Championship	

Did not play

CUT = missed the half-way cut

== U.S. national team appearances ==
Amateur

- Palmer Cup: 2013 (winners)
- Walker Cup: 2013 (winners)
